= 1938 FIFA World Cup qualification Group 1 =

Football tournament qualification stage

The four teams in this group would play against each other once. The group winner and runner-up would qualify for the 1938 FIFA World Cup held in France.

== Group 1 ==
Final table													Home							Away						
Rank	Team	Pld	W	D	L	GF	GA	Pts	(Germany)	(Sweden)	(Estonia)	(Finland)	Pld	W	D	L	GF	GA	Pts	Pld	W	D	L	GF	GA	Pts
1.	Germany	3	3	0	0	11	1	6	X	5:0	4:1	2:0	2	2	0	0	9	1	4	1	1	0	0	2	0	2
2.	Sweden	3	2	0	1	11	7	4	0:5	X	7:2	4:0	2	2	0	0	11	2	4	1	0	0	1	0	5	0
3.	Estonia	3	1	0	2	4	11	2	1:4	2:7	X	1:0	0	0	0	0	0	0	0	3	1	0	2	4	11	2
4.	Finland	3	0	0	3	0	7	0	0:2	0:4	0:1	X	2	0	0	2	0	3	0	1	0	0	1	0	4	0

== Matches ==
=== Sweden vs Finland ===
Sweden	4 — 0 (final score after 90 minutes)	Finland
Manager: (Sweden) Carl Linde Team: 01 – GK – Gustav Sjöberg; 02 – DF – Valter Lundgren; 03 – DF – Olle Källgren; 04 – MF – Kurt Svanström; 05 – MF – Gunnar Löfgren; 06 – MF – Ernst Andersson (capt.); 07 – FW – Gustaf Josefsson; 08 – FW – Erik Persson; 09 – FW – Olle Zetherlund; 10 – FW – Lennart Bunke; 11 – FW – Axel Nilsson Substitutes: none Scorers: 60' 1–0 Lennart Bunke; 65' 2–0 Erik Persson; 70' 3–0 Kurt Svanström; 81' 4–0 Lennart Bunke	Half-time: 0–0 Competition: World Cup qualifier 1938 (Group 1) Date: Wednesday; 16 June 1937 Kick off: ? Venue: Råsunda Stadium, Stockholm Attendance: 19554 Referee: Kolbjørn Dæhlen NOR Assistants: ? Match rules: 90 minutes No substitutes	Manager: (Germany) Ferdinand Fabra Team: 01 – GK – Paavo Salminen; 02 – DF – Frans Karjagin; 03 – DF – Ragnar Lindbäck; 04 – MF – Eino Lahti; 05 – MF – Kaarlo Oksanen (capt.); 06 – MF – Eino Kilpi; 07 – FW – Lauri Taipale; 08 – FW – Kurt Weckström; 09 – FW – Aatos Lehtonen; 10 – FW – Sulo Salo; 11 – FW – Yrjö Kylmälä Substitutes: none Scorers: —

=== Sweden vs Estonia ===
Sweden	7 — 2 (final score after 90 minutes)	Estonia
Manager: (Sweden) Carl Linde Team: 01 – GK – Gustav Sjöberg; 02 – DF – Valter Lundgren; 03 – DF – Olle Källgren; 04 – MF – Erik Almgren; 05 – MF – Gunnar Löfgren; 06 – MF – Kurt Svanström; 07 – FW – Gustaf Josefsson; 08 – FW – Sven Jonasson; 09 – FW – Bertil Ericsson; 10 – FW – Lennart Bunke (capt.); 11 – FW – Gustav Wetterström Substitutes: none Scorers: 7' 1–2 Gustaf Josefsson; 40' 2–2 Lennart Bunke; 41' 3–2 Gustaf Josefsson; 49' 4–2 Sven Jonasson (pen.); 73' 5–2 Gustav Wetterström; 77' 6–2 Gustav Wetterström; 84' 7–2 Gustav Wetterström	Half-time: 3–2 Competition: World Cup qualifier 1938 (Group 1) Date: Sunday; 20 June 1937 Kick off: ? Venue: Råsunda Stadium, Stockholm Attendance: 18270 Referee: Otto Remke DEN Assistants: ? Match rules: 90 minutes No substitutes	Manager: (Estonia) Bernhard Rein Team: 01 – GK – Evald Tipner (capt.); 02 – DF – Voldemar Peterson; 03 – DF – Valter Neeris; 04 – MF – Karl-Rudolf Sillak; 05 – MF – Egon Parbo; 06 – MF – Helmuth Räästas; 07 – FW – Georg Siimenson; 08 – FW – Heinrich Uukkivi; 09 – FW – Richard Kuremaa; 10 – FW – Julius Kaljo; 11 – FW – Leonhard Kass Substitutes: none Scorers: 2' 0–1 Georg Siimenson; 3' 0–2 Heinrich Uukkivi

=== Finland vs Germany ===
Finland	0 — 2 (final score after 90 minutes)	Germany
Manager: (Germany) Ferdinand Fabra Team: 01 – GK – Viljo Halme; 02 – DF – Frans Karjagin; 03 – DF – Ragnar Lindbäck; 04 – MF – Eino Lahti; 05 – MF – Kaarlo Oksanen (capt.); 06 – MF – Eino Kilpi; 07 – FW – Lauri Taipale; 08 – FW – Kurt Weckström; 09 – FW – Pentti Larvo; 10 – FW – Ernst Grönlund; 11 – FW – Nuutti Lintamo Substitutes: none Scorers: —	Half-time: 0–1 Competition: World Cup qualifier 1938 (Group 1) Date: Tuesday; 29 June 1937 Kick off: ? Venue: Pallokenttä, Helsinki Attendance: 6619 Referee: Otto Remke DEN Assistants: ? Match rules: 90 minutes No substitutes	Manager: (Germany) Sepp Herberger Team: 01 – GK – Hans Jakob; 02 – DF – Paul Janes; 03 – DF – Reinhold Münzenberg; 04 – MF – Andreas Kupfer; 05 – MF – Ludwig Goldbrunner; 06 – MF – Albin Kitzinger; 07 – FW – Ernst Lehner; 08 – FW – Rudolf Gellesch; 09 – FW – Otto Siffling; 10 – FW – Fritz Szepan (capt.); 11 – FW – Adolf Urban Substitutes: none Scorers: 6' 0–1 Ernst Lehner; 60' 0–2 Adolf Urban

=== Finland vs Estonia ===
Finland	0 — 1 (final score after 90 minutes)	Estonia
Manager: (Germany) Ferdinand Fabra Team: 01 – GK – Viljo Halme; 02 – DF – Frans Karjagin; 03 – DF – Kaarlo Oksanen; 04 – MF – William Kanerva; 05 – MF – Jarl Malmgren (capt.); 06 – MF – Eino Lahti; 07 – FW – Paavo Virtanen; 08 – FW – Kurt Weckström; 09 – FW – Aatos Lehtonen; 10 – FW – Sulo Salo; 11 – FW – Holger Salin Substitutes: none Scorers: —	Half-time: 0–0 Competition: World Cup qualifier 1938 (Group 1) Date: Thursday; 19 August 1937 Kick off: ? Venue: Urheilupuisto, Turku Attendance: 4797 Referee: Ivan Eklind SWE Assistants: ? Match rules: 90 minutes No substitutes	Manager: (Estonia) Bernhard Rein Team: 01 – GK – Evald Tipner (capt.); 02 – DF – Elmar Tepp; 03 – DF – Valter Neeris; 04 – MF – Karl–Rudolf Sillak; 05 – MF – Egon Parbo; 06 – MF – Juho Matsalu; 07 – FW – Georg Siimenson; 08 – FW – Julius Kaljo; 09 – FW – Richard Kuremaa; 10 – FW – Ralf Veidemann; 11 – FW – Heinrich Uukkivi Substitutes: none Scorers: 56' 0–1 Richard Kuremaa

=== Germany vs Estonia ===
Germany	4 — 1 (final score after 90 minutes)	Estonia
Manager: (Germany) Sepp Herberger Team: 01 – GK – Hans Jakob; 02 – DF – Paul Janes; 03 – DF – Reinhold Münzenberg; 04 – MF – Walter Rose; 05 – MF – Ludwig Goldbrunner; 06 – MF – Erwin Schädler; 07 – FW – Ernst Lehner; 08 – FW – Josef Gauchel; 09 – FW – Hans Berndt; 10 – FW – Fritz Szepan (capt.); 11 – FW – Wilhelm Simetsreiter Substitutes: none Scorers: 50' 1–1 Ernst Lehner; 53' 2–1 Josef Gauchel; 65' 3–1 Ernst Lehner; 86' 4–1 Josef Gauchel	Half-time: 0–1 Competition: World Cup qualifier 1938 (Group 1) Date: Sunday; 29 August 1937 Kick off: ? Venue: Horst Wessel-Stadium, Königsberg Attendance: 15000 Referee: Bruno Pfützner TCH Assistants: ? Match rules: 90 minutes No substitutes	Manager: (Estonia) Bernhard Rein Team: 01 – GK – Evald Tipner (capt.); 02 – DF – Elmar Tepp; 03 – DF – Valter Neeris; 06 – MF – Karl–Rudolf Sillak; 04 – MF – Ferdinand Murr; 05 – MF – Egon Parbo; 07 – FW – Georg Siimenson; 10 – FW – Julius Kaljo; 09 – FW – Richard Kuremaa; 11 – FW – Ralf Veidemann; 08 – FW – Heinrich Uukkivi Substitutes: none Scorers: 32' 0–1 Georg Siimenson

=== Germany vs Sweden ===
Germany	5 — 0 (final score after 90 minutes)	Sweden
Manager: (Germany) Sepp Herberger Team: 01 – GK – Hans Jakob; 02 – DF – Paul Janes; 03 – DF – Reinhold Münzenberg; 04 – MF – Andreas Kupfer; 05 – MF – Ludwig Goldbrunner; 06 – MF – Rudolf Gellesch; 07 – FW – Ernst Lehner; 08 – FW – Helmut Schön; 09 – FW – Otto Siffling; 10 – FW – Fritz Szepan (capt.); 11 – FW – Adolf Urban Substitutes: none Scorers: 2' 1–0 Otto Siffling; 8' 2–0 Fritz Szepan; 48' 3–0 Helmut Schön; 57' 4–0 Otto Siffling; 63' 5–0 Helmut Schön	Half-time: 2–0 Competition: World Cup qualifier 1938 (Group 1) Date: Sunday; 21 November 1937 Kick off: ? Venue: Altonaer Stadion, Hamburg Attendance: 55000 Referee: Bruno Pfitzner TCH Assistants: ? Match rules: 90 minutes No substitutes	Manager: (Sweden) Carl Linde Team: 01 – GK – Sven Bergqvist; 02 – DF – Ivar Eriksson; 03 – DF – Karl Johansson; 04 – MF – Lars Flodin; 05 – MF – Sven Nilsson (capt.); 06 – MF – Karl-Erik Grahn; 07 – FW – Malte Mårtensson; 08 – FW – Lennart Carlsson; 09 – FW – Arne Nyberg; 10 – FW – Gunnar Bergström; 11 – FW – Åke Andersson Substitutes: none Scorers: —

== Team stats ==
=== Germany ===
Head coach: (Germany) Sepp Herberger

Pos.	Player	DoB	Games played	Goals	Minutes played	Sub off	Sub on	(Finland)	(Estonia)	(Sweden)	Club
FW	Hans Berndt	Oct 30, 1913	1	0	90	0	0	—	90	—	(Germany) Tennis Borussia Berlin
FW	Josef Gauchel	Sep 11, 1916	1	2	90	0	0	—	90	—	(Germany) TuS Neuendorf
MF	Rudolf Gellesch	May 1, 1914	2	0	180	0	0	90	—	90	(Germany) FC Schalke 04
MF	Ludwig Goldbrunner	Mar 5, 1908	3	0	270	0	0	90	90	90	(Germany) Bayern Munich
GK	Hans Jakob	Jun 16, 1908	3	0	270	0	0	90	90	90	(Germany) SSV Jahn Regensburg
DF	Paul Janes	Mar 11, 1912	3	0	270	0	0	90	90	90	(Germany) Fortuna Düsseldorf
MF	Albin Kitzinger	Feb 2, 1912	1	0	90	0	0	90	—	—	(Germany) 1. FC Schweinfurt 05
MF	Andreas Kupfer	May 7, 1914	2	0	180	0	0	90	—	90	(Germany) 1. FC Schweinfurt 05
FW	Ernst Lehner	Nov 7, 1912	3	3	270	0	0	90	90	90	(Germany) Schwaben Augsburg
DF	Reinhold Münzenberg	Jan 25, 1909	3	0	270	0	0	90	90	90	(Germany) Alemannia Aachen
MF	Walter Rose	Nov 5, 1912	1	0	90	0	0	—	90	—	(Germany) SpVgg Leipzig
MF	Erwin Schädler	Apr 8, 1917	1	0	90	0	0	—	90	—	(Germany) Ulmer FV 1894
FW	Helmut Schön	Sep 15, 1915	1	2	90	0	0	—	—	90	(Germany) Dresdner SC
FW	Otto Siffling	Aug 3, 1912	2	2	180	0	0	90	—	90	(Germany) SV Waldhof Mannheim
FW	Wilhelm Simetsreiter	Mar 16, 1915	1	0	90	0	0	—	90	—	(Germany) Bayern Munich
FW	Fritz Szepan	Sep 2, 1907	3	1	270	0	0	90	90	90	(Germany) FC Schalke 04
FW	Adolf Urban	Jan 9, 1914	2	1	270	0	0	90	—	90	(Germany) FC Schalke 04

=== Sweden ===
Head coach: (Sweden) Carl Linde

Pos.	Player	DoB	Games played	Goals	Minutes played	Sub off	Sub on	(Finland)	(Estonia)	(Germany)	Club
MF	Erik Almgren	Jan 28, 1908	1	0	90	0	0	—	90	—	(Sweden) AIK Fotboll
FW	Åke Andersson	Apr 22, 1917	1	0	90	0	0	—	—	90	(Sweden) GAIS
MF	Ernst Andersson	Mar 26, 1909	1	0	90	0	0	90	—	—	(Sweden) IFK Göteborg
GK	Sven Bergqvist	Aug 20, 1914	1	0	90	0	0	—	—	90	(Sweden) Hammarby IF
FW	Gunnar Bergström		1	0	90	0	0	—	—	90	(Sweden) IK Brage
FW	Lennart Bunke		2	3	180	0	0	90	90	—	(Sweden) Hälsingborgs IF
FW	Lennart Carlsson	Jul 9, 1918	1	0	90	0	0	—	—	90	(Sweden) IFK Eskilstuna
FW	Bertil Ericsson	Nov 6, 1908	1	0	90	0	0	—	90	—	(Sweden) Sandvikens IF
DF	Ivar Eriksson		1	0	90	0	0	—	—	90	(Sweden) Sandvikens IF
MF	Lars Flodin		1	0	90	0	0	—	—	90	(Sweden) Hälsingborgs IF
MF	Karl-Erik Grahn	Nov 5, 1914	1	0	90	0	0	—	—	90	(Sweden) IF Elfsborg
DF	Karl Johansson		1	0	90	0	0	—	—	90	(Sweden) IK Sleipner
FW	Sven Jonasson	Jul 9, 1909	1	1	90	0	0	—	90	—	(Sweden) IF Elfsborg
FW	Gustaf Josefsson	Feb 16, 1916	2	2	180	0	0	90	90	—	(Sweden) AIK Fotboll
DF	Olle Källgren	Sep 7, 1907	2	0	180	0	0	90	90	—	(Sweden) Sandvikens IF
MF	Gunnar Löfgren		2	0	180	0	0	90	90	—	(Sweden) IFK Göteborg
DF	Valter Lundgren	Nov 10, 1917	2	0	180	0	0	90	90	—	(Sweden) AIK Fotboll
FW	Malte Mårtensson		1	0	90	0	0	—	—	90	(Sweden) Hälsingborgs IF
FW	Axel Nilsson	Nov 12, 1911	1	0	90	0	0	90	—	—	(Sweden) AIK Fotboll
MF	Sven Nilsson	Jun 15, 1909	1	0	90	0	0	—	—	90	(Sweden) Malmö FF
FW	Arne Nyberg	Jun 20, 1913	1	0	90	0	0	—	—	90	(Sweden) IFK Göteborg
FW	Erik Persson	Nov 19, 1909	1	1	90	0	0	90	—	—	(Sweden) AIK Fotboll
GK	Gustav Sjöberg	Mar 23, 1913	2	0	180	0	0	90	90	—	(Sweden) AIK Fotboll
MF	Kurt Svanström	Mar 24, 1915	2	1	180	0	0	90	90	—	(Sweden) Örgryte IS
FW	Gustav Wetterström	Oct 15, 1911	1	3	90	0	0	—	90	—	(Sweden) IK Sleipner
FW	Olle Zetherlund	Aug 24, 1911	1	0	90	0	0	90	—	—	(Sweden) AIK Fotboll

=== Estonia ===
Head coach: (Estonia) Bernhard Rein

Pos.	Player	DoB	Games played	Goals	Minutes played	Sub off	Sub on	(Sweden)	(Germany)	(Finland)	Club
FW	Julius Kaljo	Jan 4, 1910	3	0	270	0	0	90	90	90
FW	Leonhard Kass	Oct 30, 1911	1	0	90	0	0	90	—	—
FW	Richard Kuremaa	Jan 12, 1912	3	1	270	0	0	90	90	90	(Estonia) Olümpia Tartu
MF	Juho Matsalu		1	0	90	0	0	—	90	—	Estonia Tallinn
MF	Ferdinand Murr		1	0	90	0	0	—	—	90	(Estonia) Puhkekodu Tallinn
DF	Valter Neeris	1915	3	0	270	0	0	90	90	90	(Estonia) SK Tallinna Sport
MF	Egon Parbo		3	0	270	0	0	90	90	90	Estonia Tallinn
DF	Voldemar Peterson		1	0	90	0	0	90	—	—
MF	Helmuth Räästas		1	0	90	0	0	90	—	—
FW	Georg Siimenson	Apr 14, 1912	3	2	270	0	0	90	90	90	(Estonia) SK Tallinna Sport
MF	Karl-Rudolf Sillak	1906	3	0	270	0	0	90	90	90
DF	Elmar Tepp		2	0	180	0	0	—	90	90	(Estonia) Puhkekodu Tallinn
GK	Evald Tipner	Mar 3, 1906	3	0	270	0	0	90	90	90	(Estonia) SK Tallinna Sport
FW	Heinrich Uukkivi	1913	3	1	270	0	0	90	90	90
FW	Ralf Veidemann		2	0	180	0	0	—	90	90	(Estonia) Kalev Tallinn

=== Finland ===
Head coach: (Germany) Ferdinand Fabra

Pos.	Player	DoB	Games played	Goals	Minutes played	Sub off	Sub on	(Sweden)	(Germany)	(Estonia)	Club
FW	Ernst Grönlund	Dec 18, 1902	1	0	90	0	0	—	90	—	(Finland) Helsingfors IFK
GK	Viljo Halme	Jan 24, 1907	2	0	180	0	0	—	90	90
MF	William Kanerva	Nov 26, 1902	1	0	90	0	0	—	—	90	(Finland) Helsingin Palloseura
DF	Frans Karjagin	Jun 12, 1909	3	0	270	0	0	90	90	90	(Finland) Helsingfors IFK
MF	Eino Kilpi	Oct 23, 1910	2	0	180	0	0	90	90	—
FW	Yrjö Kylmälä	Sep 20, 1911	1	0	90	0	0	90	—	—	(Finland) Toverit Helsinki
FW	Pentti Larvo	Dec 22, 1907	1	0	90	0	0	—	90	—	(Finland) Helsingin Palloseura
MF	Eino Lahti	May 18, 1915	3	0	270	0	0	90	90	90	(Finland) Vaasan Palloseura
FW	Aatos Lehtonen	Feb 15, 1914	2	0	180	0	0	90	—	90	(Finland) Helsingin Jalkapalloklubi
DF	Ragnar Lindbäck	Nov 13, 1906	2	0	180	0	0	90	90	—	(Finland) Helsingfors IFK
FW	Nuutti Lintamo	Dec 22, 1909	1	0	90	0	0	—	90	—	(Finland) Vaasan Palloseura
MF	Jarl Malmgren	Sep 12, 1908	1	0	90	0	0	—	—	90	(Finland) Helsingfors IFK
MF	Kaarlo Oksanen	Jan 11, 1909	3	0	270	0	0	90	90	90	(Finland) Helsingin Palloseura
FW	Holger Salin	Sep 18, 1911	1	0	90	0	0	—	—	90	(Finland) Helsingfors IFK
GK	Paavo Salminen	Nov 19, 1911	1	0	90	0	0	90	—	—	(Finland) Toverit Helsinki
FW	Sulo Salo	Nov 16, 1909	2	0	180	0	0	90	—	90
FW	Lauri Taipale	Sep 11, 1911	2	0	180	0	0	90	90	—
FW	Paavo Virtanen	Nov 3, 1915	1	0	90	0	0	—	—	90	(Finland) Helsingin Palloseura
FW	Kurt Weckström	Dec 4, 1911	3	0	270	0	0	90	90	90	(Finland) Helsingin Jalkapalloklubi
