= List of Estonia international footballers =

This is a complete list of Estonia international footballers – association football players who have played for the Estonia national football team.

== Players ==
Updated as of 16 November 2026.

No.
1
2
3
4
5
6
7
8
9
10
11
12
13
14
15
16
17
18
19
20
21
22
23
24
25
26
27
28
29
30
31
32
33
34
35
36
37
38
39
40
41
42
43
44
45
46
47
48
49
50
51
52
53
54
55
56
57
58
59
60
61
62
63
64
65
66
67
68
69
70
71
72
73
74
75
76
77
78
79
80
81
82
83
84
85
86
87
88
89
90
91
92
93
94
95
96
97
98
99
100
101
102
103
104
105
106
107
108
109
110
111
112
113
114
115
116
117
118
119
120
121
122
123
124
125
126
127
128
129
130
131
132
133
134
135
136
137
138
139
140
141
142
143
144
145
146
147
148
149
150
151
152
153
154
155
156
157
158
159
160
161
162
163
164
165
166
167
168
169
170
171
172
173
174
175
176
177
178
179
180
181
182
183
184
185
186
187
188
189
190
191
192
193
194
195
196
197
198
199
200
201
202
203
204
205
206
207
208
209
210
211
212
213
214
215
216
217
218
219
220
221
222
223
224
225
226
227
228
229
230
231
232
233
234
235
236
237
238
239
240
241
242
243
244
245
246
247
248
249
250
251
252
253
254
255
256
257
258
259
260
261
262
263
264
265
266
267
268
269
270
271
272
273
274
275
276
277
278
279
280
281
282
283
284
285
286
287
288
289
290
291
292
293
294
295
296
297
298
299
300
301
302
303
304
305
306
307
308
309
310
311
312
313
314
315
316
317
318
319
320
321
322

| Player | Caps | Goals | First cap | Last cap |
|---|---|---|---|---|
| Ernst Joll | 23 | 4 | 17 October 1920 | 27 August 1929 |
| Elmar Klaos | 1 | 0 | 17 October 1920 | 17 October 1920 |
| Arnold Emil Kuulmann | 4 | 1 | 17 October 1920 | 11 August 1922 |
| Heinrich Paal | 36 | 6 | 17 October 1920 | 13 September 1930 |
| Rudolf Voldemar Paal | 1 | 0 | 17 October 1920 | 17 October 1920 |
| Arnold Pihlak | 44 | 16 | 17 October 1920 | 30 August 1931 |
| Alfred Prunn-Tammiko | 1 | 0 | 17 October 1920 | 17 October 1920 |
| Karl Ree | 1 | 0 | 17 October 1920 | 17 October 1920 |
| Gustav Sepp | 1 | 0 | 17 October 1920 | 17 October 1920 |
| Otto Silber | 20 | 0 | 17 October 1920 | 4 July 1926 |
| Oskar Üpraus | 25 | 7 | 17 October 1920 | 25 September 1927 |
| Raimond Põder | 1 | 0 | 17 October 1920 | 17 October 1920 |
| Vladimir Tell | 11 | 5 | 17 October 1920 | 24 August 1924 |
| Eduard Ellmann-Eelma | 60 | 21 | 23 July 1921 | 22 August 1935 |
| Harald Kaarmann-Kaarma | 17 | 0 | 23 July 1921 | 19 September 1926 |
| August Lass | 21 | 0 | 23 July 1921 | 23 September 1928 |
| Voldemar Luik | 2 | 0 | 23 July 1921 | 28 August 1921 |
| Georg Karlis Vain | 6 | 0 | 23 July 1921 | 30 September 1923 |
| Eduard Jõepere | 1 | 0 | 28 August 1921 | 28 August 1921 |
| Adolf Anier | 1 | 0 | 11 August 1922 | 11 August 1922 |
| Sergei Javorsky-Joaveski | 2 | 0 | 11 August 1922 | 24 September 1922 |
| Bernard Rein | 27 | 0 | 11 August 1922 | 28 May 1931 |
| August Silber | 4 | 0 | 11 August 1922 | 24 July 1923 |
| Eduard Maurer | 4 | 0 | 24 September 1922 | 25 September 1923 |
| Johannes Brenner | 16 | 4 | 24 June 1923 | 15 August 1930 |
| Elmar Kaljot | 25 | 3 | 19 September 1923 | 18 September 1929 |
| Hugo Väli | 12 | 1 | 19 September 1923 | 26 August 1925 |
| Alfei Jürgenson | 4 | 0 | 3 June 1924 | 27 June 1930 |
| Voldemar Rõks | 2 | 0 | 3 June 1924 | 18 October 1924 |
| Evald Tipner | 66 | 0 | 3 June 1924 | 27 July 1939 |
| Ralf Liivar | 13 | 0 | 19 June 1924 | 10 August 1927 |
| Johannes Kichlefeldt-Uik | 9 | 0 | 25 July 1924 | 4 July 1926 |
| Johannes Lello | 3 | 0 | 25 July 1924 | 18 October 1924 |
| Eugen Einman | 64 | 5 | 14 September 1924 | 18 September 1935 |
| Otto Reinfeldt-Reinlo | 40 | 0 | 2 September 1925 | 5 September 1933 |
| Arnold Matiisen | 1 | 0 | 23 July 1926 | 23 July 1926 |
| Artur Maurer | 4 | 2 | 23 July 1926 | 27 July 1928 |
| Helmuth Räästas | 21 | 3 | 23 July 1926 | 20 June 1937 |
| Rudolf Kallaste | 10 | 0 | 16 June 1927 | 16 August 1929 |
| Julius Voldemar Piperal | 10 | 0 | 16 June 1927 | 25 July 1929 |
| Herbert Kipp | 1 | 1 | 13 August 1927 | 13 August 1927 |
| Felix Kull | 4 | 3 | 13 August 1927 | 27 August 1929 |
| Heinrich Römmer | 5 | 0 | 13 August 1927 | 25 July 1929 |
| Paul Viskar | 1 | 0 | 13 August 1927 | 13 August 1927 |
| Ferdinand Laurberg | 1 | 0 | 25 September 1927 | 25 September 1927 |
| Vladimir Silberg | 6 | 0 | 25 September 1927 | 18 September 1929 |
| Artur Neuman-Tarimäe | 26 | 0 | 25 September 1927 | 2 September 1933 |
| Karl Fischer | 4 | 0 | 9 July 1928 | 12 August 1928 |
| Alfred Ratnik | 5 | 0 | 9 July 1928 | 18 September 1929 |
| Elmar Saar | 19 | 0 | 12 August 1928 | 30 June 1936 |
| Karl-Richard Idlane | 31 | 2 | 7 July 1929 | 20 August 1936 |
| Herbert Paalberg | 2 | 0 | 7 July 1929 | 15 August 1929 |
| Aleksei Kürbis | 2 | 0 | 15 August 1929 | 27 August 1929 |
| Aleksander Mägi | 4 | 0 | 16 August 1929 | 12 June 1935 |
| Karl-Rudolf Silberg-Sillak | 52 | 1 | 16 August 1929 | 5 September 1938 |
| Friedrich Karm | 13 | 9 | 27 June 1930 | 11 June 1933 |
| Arnold Laasner | 28 | 2 | 27 June 1930 | 31 August 1936 |
| Voldemar Peterson | 22 | 0 | 27 June 1930 | 12 June 1938 |
| Aleksander Gerassimov-Kalvet | 1 | 1 | 18 July 1930 | 18 July 1930 |
| Adolf Rüütel | 4 | 0 | 18 July 1930 | 28 May 1931 |
| Valter Biiber | 2 | 0 | 6 August 1930 | 13 September 1930 |
| Heinrich Koort | 4 | 0 | 15 August 1930 | 19 June 1935 |
| Leonhard Kass | 40 | 8 | 28 May 1931 | 18 July 1940 |
| Georg Siimenson | 42 | 13 | 1 June 1931 | 27 August 1939 |
| Heinrich Uukkivi | 46 | 7 | 1 June 1931 | 18 July 1940 |
| Viktor Ader | 6 | 1 | 9 June 1931 | 5 September 1933 |
| Edmund Peterson | 1 | 0 | 17 June 1931 | 17 June 1931 |
| Julius Kaljo | 17 | 2 | 17 June 1931 | 20 July 1938 |
| Osvald Kastan | 3 | 0 | 1 September 1931 | 17 August 1932 |
| Egon Parbo | 24 | 1 | 27 September 1931 | 27 August 1939 |
| Georgi Tšutšelov | 1 | 0 | 15 July 1932 | 15 July 1932 |
| Roman Mõtlik | 4 | 1 | 6 August 1932 | 30 August 1932 |
| Alfred Valdov | 1 | 0 | 6 August 1932 | 6 August 1932 |
| Bernhard Nooni | 1 | 0 | 28 May 1933 | 28 May 1933 |
| Richard Kuremaa | 42 | 19 | 11 June 1933 | 18 July 1940 |
| Evald Mikson | 7 | 0 | 29 June 1934 | 4 August 1939 |
| Valter Neeris | 36 | 1 | 29 June 1934 | 18 July 1940 |
| Martin Jensen | 6 | 0 | 8 August 1934 | 22 June 1938 |
| Valter Mäng | 2 | 0 | 8 August 1934 | 12 June 1935 |
| Jüri Välbe | 1 | 0 | 10 August 1934 | 10 August 1934 |
| Helmuth Kippar | 8 | 0 | 12 June 1935 | 18 September 1935 |
| Johannes Tšutšelov | 7 | 0 | 19 June 1935 | 18 September 1935 |
| Aleksander Valkenpert | 9 | 0 | 9 July 1935 | 14 July 1937 |
| Nikolai Linberg | 3 | 2 | 20 August 1935 | 22 June 1938 |
| Edmund Karp | 10 | 0 | 30 June 1936 | 18 July 1940 |
| Nikolai Kaubisch | 3 | 0 | 20 August 1936 | 31 August 1936 |
| Ferdinand Murr | 8 | 0 | 20 August 1936 | 5 September 1938 |
| Juho Matson-Matsalu | 15 | 0 | 3 June 1937 | 18 July 1940 |
| Ralf Veidemann | 13 | 3 | 3 June 1937 | 18 July 1940 |
| Elmar Tepp | 18 | 0 | 14 July 1937 | 18 July 1940 |
| Aavo Sillandi | 3 | 1 | 4 September 1937 | 19 September 1937 |
| Rudolf Härmates | 1 | 0 | 19 September 1937 | 19 September 1937 |
| Viktor Piisang | 9 | 0 | 12 June 1938 | 18 July 1940 |
| Johannes Niks | 1 | 0 | 17 August 1938 | 17 August 1938 |
| Ervin Ollik | 1 | 0 | 17 August 1938 | 17 August 1938 |
| Viktor Sieger | 3 | 0 | 29 June 1939 | 4 August 1939 |
| Kopel Koslovski | 1 | 0 | 27 July 1939 | 27 July 1939 |
| Aleksander Kõss | 1 | 0 | 18 July 1940 | 18 July 1940 |
| Eduard Papp | 1 | 0 | 18 July 1940 | 18 July 1940 |
| Evald Smitt | 1 | 0 | 18 July 1940 | 18 July 1940 |
| Urmas Hepner | 13 | 0 | 3 June 1992 | 9 March 1994 |
| Risto Kallaste | 36 | 0 | 3 June 1992 | 29 May 1996 |
| Toomas Kallaste | 42 | 0 | 3 June 1992 | 3 July 2003 |
| Urmas Kirs | 80 | 5 | 3 June 1992 | 26 April 2000 |
| Meelis Lindmaa | 28 | 0 | 3 June 1992 | 5 October 1996 |
| Tarmo Linnumäe | 29 | 0 | 3 June 1992 | 24 April 1996 |
| Indro Olumets | 32 | 2 | 3 June 1992 | 24 April 1996 |
| Mart Poom | 120 | 0 | 3 June 1992 | 10 June 2009 |
| Igor Prins | 20 | 0 | 3 June 1992 | 4 September 1994 |
| Aleksandr Puštov | 10 | 1 | 3 June 1992 | 10 November 1993 |
| Martin Reim | 157 | 14 | 3 June 1992 | 6 June 2009 |
| Urmas Kaljend | 20 | 0 | 3 June 1992 | 26 October 1994 |
| Sergei Ratnikov | 14 | 0 | 3 June 1992 | 16 August 1994 |
| Marko Kristal | 143 | 9 | 3 June 1992 | 20 April 2005 |
| Viktor Alonen | 71 | 0 | 3 June 1992 | 6 October 2001 |
| Sergei Hohlov-Simson | 58 | 2 | 10 July 1992 | 16 February 2004 |
| Jaanus Veensalu | 6 | 0 | 11 July 1992 | 2 June 1993 |
| Marek Lemsalu | 86 | 3 | 11 July 1992 | 28 March 2007 |
| Lembit Rajala | 26 | 2 | 25 October 1992 | 9 July 1996 |
| Andrei Borissov | 14 | 0 | 20 February 1993 | 17 November 1993 |
| Sergei Bragin | 12 | 3 | 20 February 1993 | 17 November 1993 |
| Aleksandr Olerski | 2 | 0 | 21 February 1993 | 7 April 1993 |
| Dzintar Klavan | 19 | 0 | 21 February 1993 | 11 June 1995 |
| Sergei Zamorski | 4 | 1 | 2 July 1993 | 17 November 1993 |
| Sepo Vilderson | 1 | 0 | 5 September 1993 | 5 September 1993 |
| Mati Pari | 22 | 1 | 9 March 1994 | 22 June 1997 |
| Toomas Krõm | 11 | 0 | 7 May 1994 | 24 April 1996 |
| Indrek Zelinski | 103 | 27 | 7 May 1994 | 21 May 2010 |
| Gert Olesk | 13 | 0 | 1 June 1994 | 25 February 2000 |
| Tarmo Saks | 5 | 0 | 29 July 1994 | 10 July 1997 |
| Toomas Tohver | 24 | 0 | 29 July 1994 | 16 August 2000 |
| Ivan O'Konnel-Bronin | 22 | 0 | 29 July 1994 | 3 November 1999 |
| Marko Lelov | 3 | 0 | 29 July 1994 | 20 May 1995 |
| Rain Vessenberg | 5 | 0 | 26 October 1994 | 6 February 1995 |
| Vahur Vahtramäe | 7 | 0 | 26 October 1994 | 16 November 1996 |
| Janek Kiisman | 7 | 0 | 26 October 1994 | 3 September 1995 |
| Alari Lell | 6 | 0 | 25 March 1995 | 11 October 1995 |
| Argo Arbeiter | 29 | 6 | 29 March 1995 | 2 June 2000 |
| Marko Lepik | 3 | 0 | 29 March 1995 | 20 May 1995 |
| Martin Lepa | 5 | 0 | 26 April 1995 | 11 October 1995 |
| Andre Anis | 3 | 0 | 19 May 1995 | 25 February 2000 |
| Arvo Kraam | 3 | 0 | 19 May 1995 | 16 August 1995 |
| Andres Oper | 134 | 38 | 19 May 1995 | 26 May 2014 |
| Jan Õun | 4 | 0 | 19 May 1995 | 28 November 1998 |
| Aivar Priidel | 2 | 0 | 19 May 1995 | 20 May 1995 |
| Janek Meet | 37 | 0 | 19 May 1995 | 25 February 2000 |
| Tõnis Kalde | 2 | 0 | 19 May 1995 | 20 May 1995 |
| Atko Väikmeri | 2 | 0 | 19 May 1995 | 20 May 1995 |
| Martin Kaalma | 35 | 0 | 20 May 1995 | 30 November 2004 |
| Raivo Nõmmik | 17 | 0 | 20 May 1995 | 23 February 2000 |
| Liivo Leetma | 36 | 0 | 29 May 1996 | 24 March 2007 |
| Meelis Rooba | 50 | 4 | 7 July 1996 | 28 April 2004 |
| Urmas Rooba | 70 | 1 | 7 July 1996 | 4 June 2008 |
| Sergei Pareiko | 65 | 0 | 31 August 1996 | 17 November 2015 |
| Kristen Viikmäe | 115 | 15 | 26 January 1997 | 3 June 2013 |
| Teet Allas | 73 | 2 | 1 March 1997 | 9 November 2007 |
| Sergei Terehhov | 94 | 5 | 9 July 1997 | 17 October 2007 |
| Erko Saviauk | 60 | 1 | 9 July 1997 | 12 November 2005 |
| Ain Tammus | 3 | 0 | 10 July 1997 | 9 May 1998 |
| Maksim Smirnov | 39 | 2 | 27 November 1997 | 28 May 2006 |
| Eigo Mägi | 1 | 0 | 27 November 1997 | 27 November 1997 |
| Aivar Anniste | 45 | 3 | 27 November 1997 | 22 November 2008 |
| Dmitri Ustritski | 17 | 1 | 9 May 1998 | 16 February 2003 |
| Mark Švets | 16 | 1 | 18 November 1998 | 15 August 2001 |
| Raio Piiroja | 114 | 8 | 21 November 1998 | 31 March 2015 |
| Urmas Kaal | 1 | 0 | 9 June 1999 | 9 June 1999 |
| Kert Haavistu | 44 | 0 | 18 August 1999 | 18 August 2004 |
| Andrei Stepanov | 89 | 1 | 30 October 1999 | 28 May 2012 |
| Joel Lindpere | 107 | 7 | 1 November 1999 | 1 June 2016 |
| Aleksander Saharov | 25 | 1 | 26 April 2000 | 8 June 2005 |
| Janno Jürisson | 6 | 0 | 26 April 2000 | 15 November 2000 |
| Märt Kosemets | 6 | 0 | 15 November 2000 | 2 December 2004 |
| Enver Jääger | 2 | 0 | 10 December 2000 | 30 November 2004 |
| Jevgeni Novikov | 13 | 2 | 19 March 2001 | 4 June 2008 |
| Taavi Rähn | 74 | 0 | 2 June 2001 | 29 May 2014 |
| Pavel Londak | 27 | 0 | 4 July 2001 | 8 June 2016 |
| Jarmo Ahjupera | 22 | 1 | 4 July 2001 | 10 September 2013 |
| Enar Jääger | 126 | 0 | 12 October 2002 | 9 November 2017 |
| Ott Reinumäe | 25 | 0 | 9 February 2003 | 2 December 2004 |
| Vjatšeslav Zahovaiko | 39 | 8 | 9 February 2003 | 25 March 2011 |
| Ingemar Teever | 30 | 4 | 29 March 2003 | 8 September 2015 |
| Ragnar Klavan | 130 | 3 | 3 July 2003 | 21 March 2024 |
| Dmitri Kulikov | 1 | 0 | 3 July 2003 | 3 July 2003 |
| Jaanus Sirel | 1 | 1 | 3 July 2003 | 3 July 2003 |
| Aleksandr Dmitrijev | 106 | 0 | 18 February 2004 | 27 March 2018 |
| Tarmo Kink | 82 | 6 | 31 March 2004 | 7 June 2014 |
| Artur Kotenko | 27 | 0 | 18 August 2004 | 11 June 2013 |
| Dmitri Kruglov | 115 | 4 | 13 October 2004 | 26 March 2019 |
| Mati Lember | 2 | 0 | 30 November 2004 | 2 December 2004 |
| Tihhon Šišov | 42 | 0 | 30 November 2004 | 31 May 2014 |
| Alo Bärengrub | 48 | 0 | 2 December 2004 | 27 December 2014 |
| Sander Post | 12 | 1 | 2 December 2004 | 31 May 2014 |
| Andrei Sidorenkov | 23 | 0 | 2 December 2004 | 7 June 2013 |
| Tarmo Neemelo | 22 | 1 | 20 April 2005 | 16 October 2012 |
| Jürgen Kuresoo | 2 | 0 | 16 November 2005 | 1 March 2006 |
| Vladislav Gussev | 2 | 0 | 28 May 2006 | 11 October 2006 |
| Konstantin Vassiljev | 159 | 26 | 31 May 2006 | 9 September 2025 |
| Ats Purje | 69 | 10 | 11 October 2006 | 15 November 2018 |
| Gert Kams | 60 | 3 | 3 February 2007 | 14 November 2019 |
| Siim Roops | 1 | 0 | 3 February 2007 | 3 February 2007 |
| Oliver Konsa | 20 | 0 | 3 February 2007 | 3 June 2012 |
| Vladimir Voskoboinikov | 36 | 4 | 2 June 2007 | 11 June 2013 |
| Kaimar Saag | 46 | 3 | 8 September 2007 | 4 September 2014 |
| Mihkel Aksalu | 46 | 0 | 17 October 2007 | 24 March 2021 |
| Taijo Teniste | 100 | 1 | 9 November 2007 | 9 September 2025 |
| Martin Vunk | 67 | 1 | 27 February 2008 | 12 October 2014 |
| Sander Puri | 92 | 4 | 30 May 2008 | 13 June 2022 |
| Igor Morozov | 30 | 0 | 31 May 2008 | 27 March 2018 |
| Sergei Zenjov | 114 | 17 | 20 August 2008 | 11 October 2024 |
| Alo Dupikov | 5 | 0 | 29 May 2009 | 22 December 2010 |
| Vitali Gussev | 1 | 0 | 29 May 2009 | 29 May 2009 |
| Kristian Marmor | 1 | 0 | 29 May 2009 | 29 May 2009 |
| Eino Puri | 5 | 0 | 29 May 2009 | 31 May 2014 |
| Karl Palatu | 9 | 0 | 21 May 2010 | 28 May 2012 |
| Sergei Mošnikov | 35 | 2 | 19 June 2010 | 7 January 2018 |
| Siim Luts | 43 | 4 | 17 November 2010 | 11 October 2020 |
| Rauno Alliku | 10 | 0 | 18 December 2010 | 27 March 2021 |
| Markus Jürgenson | 11 | 0 | 18 December 2010 | 9 June 2018 |
| Marko Meerits | 14 | 0 | 18 December 2010 | 12 January 2023 |
| Henri Anier | 104 | 23 | 19 June 2011 | |
| Mikk Reintam | 12 | 0 | 19 June 2011 | 7 January 2018 |
| Joonas Tamm | 68 | 4 | 19 June 2011 | |
| Siim Tenno | 3 | 0 | 19 June 2011 | 29 February 2012 |
| Joel Indermitte | 2 | 0 | 19 June 2011 | 23 June 2011 |
| Meelis Peitre | 2 | 0 | 19 June 2011 | 23 June 2011 |
| Albert Prosa | 7 | 1 | 19 June 2011 | 23 November 2017 |
| Andrei Veis | 2 | 0 | 19 June 2011 | 23 June 2011 |
| Kaarel Kiidron | 1 | 0 | 25 May 2012 | 25 May 2012 |
| Henrik Ojamaa | 63 | 1 | 25 May 2012 | 17 October 2023 |
| Ilja Antonov | 52 | 2 | 8 November 2012 | 24 March 2021 |
| Ken Kallaste | 61 | 0 | 8 November 2012 | 21 March 2024 |
| Karl Mööl | 10 | 0 | 8 November 2012 | 8 January 2023 |
| Andre Frolov | 6 | 0 | 8 November 2012 | 31 March 2021 |
| Stanislav Prins | 1 | 0 | 8 November 2012 | 8 November 2012 |
| Rimo Hunt | 7 | 1 | 3 June 2013 | 18 November 2014 |
| Artjom Artjunin | 6 | 0 | 15 November 2013 | 27 December 2014 |
| Karol Mets | 109 | 0 | 19 November 2013 | |
| Maksim Podholjuzin | 1 | 0 | 5 March 2014 | 5 March 2014 |
| Frank Liivak | 29 | 3 | 26 May 2014 | |
| Igor Subbotin | 5 | 0 | 31 May 2014 | 6 January 2016 |
| Hannes Anier | 4 | 1 | 4 June 2014 | 27 December 2014 |
| Artur Pikk | 62 | 1 | 7 June 2014 | 8 September 2024 |
| Brent Lepistu | 13 | 0 | 27 December 2014 | 26 March 2019 |
| Andreas Raudsepp | 7 | 0 | 27 December 2014 | 8 June 2016 |
| Vladimir Avilov | 2 | 0 | 27 December 2014 | 6 January 2016 |
| Artjom Dmitrijev | 24 | 0 | 9 June 2015 | 9 September 2019 |
| Maksim Gussev | 9 | 1 | 9 June 2015 | 31 August 2016 |
| Nikita Baranov | 48 | 0 | 11 November 2015 | 12 January 2024 |
| Rauno Sappinen | 65 | 17 | 11 November 2015 | |
| Mattias Käit | 72 | 11 | 6 January 2016 | |
| Hindrek Ojamaa | 6 | 0 | 6 January 2016 | 12 January 2023 |
| Pavel Marin | 14 | 2 | 29 May 2016 | 18 November 2020 |
| Jan Kokla | 1 | 0 | 1 June 2016 | 1 June 2016 |
| Andreas Vaikla | 3 | 0 | 1 June 2016 | 26 November 2017 |
| Pavel Dõmov | 2 | 0 | 19 November 2016 | 22 November 2016 |
| Janar Toomet | 5 | 0 | 19 November 2016 | 12 June 2017 |
| Trevor Elhi | 9 | 0 | 22 November 2016 | 15 January 2019 |
| Martin Miller | 41 | 2 | 22 November 2016 | |
| Madis Vihmann | 19 | 0 | 12 June 2017 | 11 June 2019 |
| Marek Kaljumäe | 5 | 0 | 19 November 2017 | 12 October 2018 |
| Deniss Tjapkin | 2 | 0 | 19 November 2017 | 26 November 2017 |
| Mark Oliver Roosnupp | 10 | 0 | 19 November 2017 | 31 March 2021 |
| Joseph Saliste | 12 | 0 | 19 November 2017 | |
| Sören Kaldma | 3 | 0 | 19 November 2017 | 26 November 2017 |
| Mihkel Ainsalu | 26 | 0 | 23 November 2017 | |
| Matvei Igonen | 19 | 0 | 23 November 2017 | |
| Michael Lilander | 18 | 0 | 23 November 2017 | 8 September 2024 |
| Sergei Lepmets | 12 | 0 | 30 May 2018 | 19 November 2019 |
| Robert Kirss | 14 | 1 | 11 January 2019 | 23 September 2022 |
| Rasmus Peetson | 31 | 3 | 11 January 2019 | |
| Henrik Pürg | 11 | 0 | 11 January 2019 | 26 September 2022 |
| Markus Poom | 40 | 0 | 11 January 2019 | |
| Tristan Koskor | 2 | 0 | 11 January 2019 | 15 January 2019 |
| Märten Kuusk | 47 | 0 | 15 January 2019 | |
| Vlasiy Sinyavskiy | 50 | 1 | 8 June 2019 | |
| Erik Sorga | 31 | 4 | 8 June 2019 | 11 October 2024 |
| Vladislav Kreida | 25 | 0 | 11 June 2019 | |
| Karl Jakob Hein | 51 | 0 | 5 September 2020 | |
| Henri Järvelaid | 4 | 0 | 5 September 2020 | 11 November 2020 |
| Georgi Tunjov | 16 | 0 | 5 September 2020 | 19 November 2023 |
| Mark Anders Lepik | 11 | 1 | 7 October 2020 | |
| Edgar Tur | 7 | 1 | 7 October 2020 | 9 September 2025 |
| Markus Soomets | 27 | 0 | 11 November 2020 | |
| Karl Rudolf Õigus | 3 | 0 | 24 March 2021 | 31 March 2021 |
| Maksim Paskotši | 46 | 3 | 24 March 2021 | |
| Bogdan Vaštšuk | 15 | 0 | 24 March 2021 | 19 November 2023 |
| Marco Lukka | 6 | 0 | 5 September 2021 | 12 January 2024 |
| Rocco Robert Shein | 27 | 1 | 13 June 2022 | |
| Erko Jonne Tõugjas | 13 | 0 | 8 January 2023 | |
| Karl Andre Vallner | 5 | 0 | 8 January 2023 | |
| Nikita Vassiljev | 3 | 0 | 8 January 2023 | 12 January 2024 |
| Ioan Yakovlev | 14 | 1 | 8 January 2023 | |
| Marko Lipp | 2 | 0 | 8 January 2023 | 12 January 2023 |
| Alex Matthias Tamm | 21 | 2 | 8 January 2023 | |
| Karl-Romet Nõmm | 1 | 0 | 12 January 2023 | 12 January 2023 |
| Sten Reinkort | 5 | 0 | 12 January 2023 | 20 June 2023 |
| Robi Saarma | 18 | 1 | 12 January 2023 | |
| Danil Kuraksin | 4 | 1 | 12 January 2023 | 19 November 2024 |
| Martin Vetkal | 15 | 1 | 13 October 2023 | |
| Oliver Jürgens | 3 | 0 | 16 November 2023 | 21 March 2024 |
| Kristo Hussar | 8 | 0 | 12 January 2024 | |
| Nikita Mihhailov | 1 | 0 | 12 January 2024 | 12 January 2024 |
| Kevor Palumets | 27 | 2 | 12 January 2024 | |
| Ramol Sillamaa | 1 | 0 | 12 January 2024 | 12 January 2024 |
| Andreas Vaher | 1 | 0 | 12 January 2024 | 12 January 2024 |
| Oskar Hõim | 1 | 0 | 12 January 2024 | 12 January 2024 |
| Robert Veering | 1 | 0 | 12 January 2024 | 12 January 2024 |
| Kaspar Laur | 1 | 0 | 26 March 2024 | 26 March 2024 |
| Michael Schjønning-Larsen | 26 | 0 | 8 June 2024 | |
| Patrik Kristal | 20 | 1 | 8 September 2024 | |
| Dimitri Jepihhin | 1 | 0 | 6 June 2025 | 6 June 2025 |
| Karel Mustmaa | 11 | 1 | 11 October 2025 | |
| Marten-Chris Paalberg | 5 | 0 | 14 October 2025 | |
| Kristofer Käit | 1 | 0 | 27 March 2026 | |
| Mattias Männilaan | 8 | 0 | 27 March 2026 | |
| Tanel Tammik | 2 | 1 | 27 March 2026 | |
| Kaur Kivila | 1 | 0 | 30 March 2026 | |
| Mihhail Kolobov | 2 | 0 | 30 March 2026 | |
| Rommi Siht | 1 | 0 | 30 March 2026 | |
| Sander Tovstik | 1 | 0 | 30 March 2026 | |
| Tony Varjund | 2 | 1 | 6 June 2026 | |
| Maksimilian Skvortsov | 1 | 0 | 6 October 2026 | |

== See also ==
- List of Estonia women's international footballers
