= Johan Alho =

Finnish footballer and referee (1907-1982)

Personal information
- Full name: Johan Aksel Alho
- Date of birth: 9 February 1907
- Place of birth: Helsinki, Grand Duchy of Finland
- Date of death: 14 September 1982 (aged 75)
- Place of death: Helsinki, Finland
- Position: Defender

Senior career*
Years	Team	Apps	(Gls)
1929–1931	Vesa	–	(–)
1931–1936	HJK	34	(3)
- * Club domestic league appearances and goals

Johan ″Jonne″ Aksel Alho (9 February 1907 – 14 September 1982) was a Finnish footballer and a football referee.

== Football ==
=== Playing career ===
Alho started his career in the Helsinki working-class side Töölön Vesa, winning the Finnish Workers' Sports Federation's (TUL) Championship in 1930. At the time, the football in Finland was split in two due to the 1918 Finnish Civil War. In 1931, Alho was a member of the TUL football team participating the Workers' Summer Olympiad in Vienna.

In the fall of 1931, three Vesa players, Alho, Valdemar Virtanen and Kurt Weckström, switched to the bourgeois HJK Helsinki. Between 1931 and 1936, Alho played six seasons for HJK in the Finnish top tier Mestaruussarja.

=== As a referee ===
After his playing career, Alho was a FIFA international referee in 1941–1956 and 1958–1961. He officiated 11 internationals including the first round match between Sweden and Norway at the 1952 Summer Olympics. In 1959, Alho refereed Finnish Cup final.

== Other sports ==
Alho also played bandy for Töölön Vesa, winning the TUL Championship in 1929. As a bandy referee, he officiated the match between Norway and Sweden at the 1952 Winter Olympics where bandy was held as a demonstration sport.
