= Eino Kilpi =

Eino Kilpi may refer to:

- Eino Kilpi (politician) (1889–1963), Finnish journalist and politician
- Eino Kilpi (footballer) (1906–1989), Finnish international footballer
