= Finnish Workers' Sports Federation football team =

Former association football team

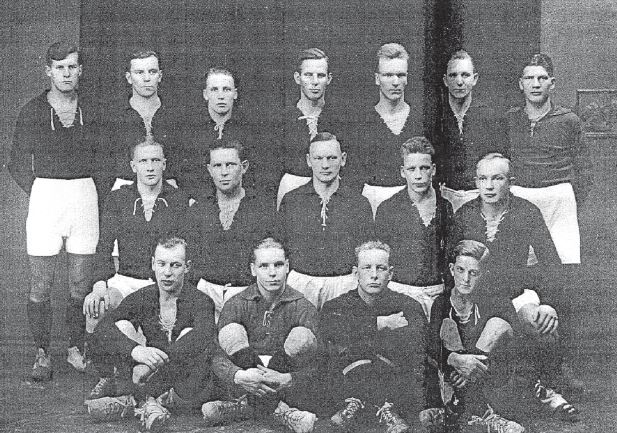
Finnish Workers' Sports Federation football team at the 1928 Moscow Spartakiad

Finnish Workers' Sports Federation football team (Finnish: TUL:n liittojoukkue) was an association football team representing the Finnish Workers' Sports Federation (TUL) in 1921–1950. At the time, sport in Finland was divided, as the leftist TUL was isolated from the right-wing sports movement. In football, the TUL clubs and the Finnish Football Association (SPL) clubs competed in their own championship series, and the Finland national football team was selected from SPL players only. The TUL football team participated in the International Workers' Olympiads in 1925, 1931 and 1937 and the Moscow Spartakiad in 1928.

== History ==
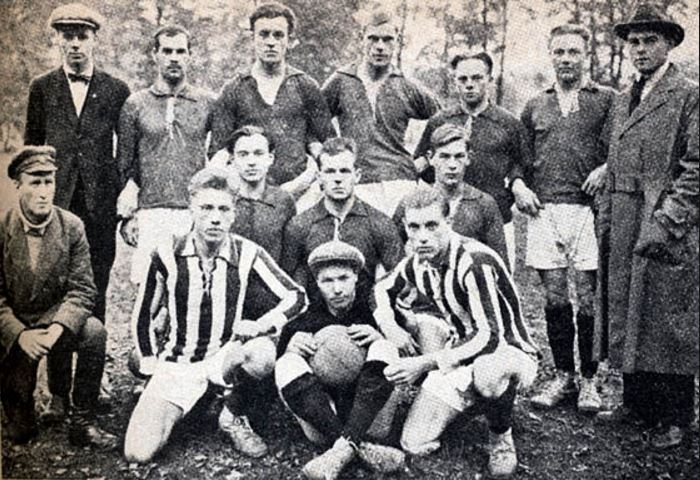
TUL football squad in Petrograd, Soviet Russia in 1922

=== Background ===
After the 1918 Finnish Civil War, the Finnish Gymnastics and Sports Federation (SVUL) dismissed all clubs and athletes who had participated in the war on the Red side. In January 1919, the expelled labour movement related associations established the Finnish Workers' Sports Federation (TUL). The Finnish sports movement was now divided, as the two parties did not cooperate. Both federations had their own competition systems, and the national teams were composed of SVUL athletes only. Instead of the Olympic Games, the TUL athletes participated in the Workers' Olympiads and the Spartakiads.

In football, TUL and the Finnish Football Association (SPL), which was a member of the SVUL, had their own championship series. The Football Association winner was declared the Finnish Champion until 1944; in 1945–1948, the title was decided by a final match between the TUL and Football Association champions. The TUL Championship series was finally merged with the Football Association's Mestaruussarja in 1956.

=== Formation and the international contacts ===
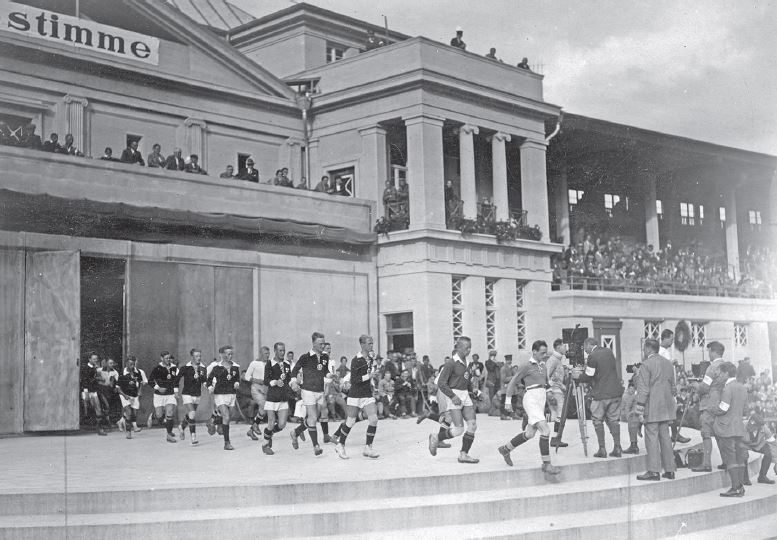
The German and Finnish teams entering the field in the 1925 Workers' Olympiad final in Frankfurt

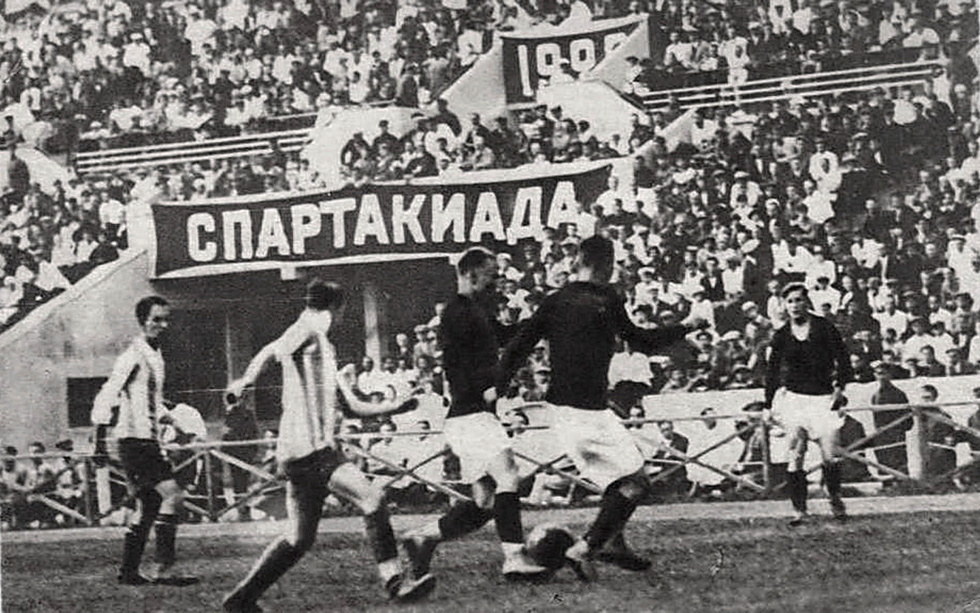
1928 Moscow All-Union Spartakiad football match Uruguay (Federación Roja del Deporte) vs. Finland (Finnish Workers' Sports Association) at the Dynamo Stadium

The Finnish Workers' Sports Federation football team was established in September 1922. The squad toured Soviet Russia, meeting seven local sides and winning three of the matches. The match against the Soviet XI ended 4–1 for the Russians. These matches were the first international contacts of Soviet sport after the 1917 October Revolution. A year later, the Soviet Union national football team visited Finland and beat the TUL squad 5–0.

The

TUL football team participated in all three International Workers' Summer Olympiads in 1925, 1931 and 1937. At the 1925 Olympiads in Frankfurt, the TUL squad reached the final against the German team of the Arbeiter-Turn- und Sportbund. The final was played at the Waldstadion in front of 40,000 spectators. In 1928, the TUL football team participated in the Spartakiad in Moscow, although the federation's Social Democratic board had forbidden contacts with the Soviet-led Red Sports International. As a result, the Communist clubs that had sent their athletes to the Spartakiad were dismissed from TUL in 1929. Most of the expelled footballers joined member clubs of the Finnish Football Association in order to continue their careers. This also made it possible for them to be selected for the national team.

In addition to the Workers' Olympiads and the Spartakiad, the TUL football team played 16 matches against international opponents between 1922 and 1939. The leftist press often called these ″caps″, like those of the Finland national team. Apart from the Soviet Union, the opponents were teams of the local workers' sports federations: the German Arbeiter-Turn- und Sportbund, the Norwegian Arbeidernes Idrettsforbund, the Swedish Arbetarnas Idrottsförening, the Latvian Strādnieku Sporta Savienība and the Estonian Eesti Töölisspordi Liit. In some cases, TUL met the Soviet national team, but usually the opponent was a regional selection. Of the 16 matches, TUL won only three.

From the late 1920s onwards, several TUL footballers switched to the Finnish Football Association's side. In the 1930s, these ″defectors″ formed the spine of the Finland national team. For example, the Finland squad at the 1936 Summer Olympics included eight former TUL players. By World War II, a total of 13 former TUL footballers had been selected for the national team. These defectors were usually considered traitors, but many returned to TUL as relations were normalized after the war.

=== Cooperation with the Finnish Football Association ===
As Finland had been elected to host the 1940 Summer Olympics, TUL and SVUL launched negotiations on cooperation in 1937. Finally, TUL and the Finnish Football Association signed an agreement in May 1939. On 6 July, the TUL football team and the Finnish Football Association XI met at the Helsinki Olympic Stadium. The match ended 4–1 for the Football Association. This was the first time since 1917 that the two sides had competed together. Over the next 11 years, the TUL and Football Association squads met 9 times. As the most talented TUL players had switched sides, the Football Association won 8 matches with a goal difference of 26–11.

According to the agreement, TUL players were now selected for the Finland national team for the first time. The first TUL player to represent Finland was Kaarlo Niilonen, who debuted against Sweden in October 1943. In the late 1940s, one third of the national team came from the TUL side.

== Competition record ==
=== 1925 Workers' Summer Olympiad ===
Semifinal

24 July 1925

Finnish Workers' Sports Federation (Finland)	4–2	(Belgium) Arbeidersvoetbalbond

Waldstadion Football Grounds, Frankfurt am Main

Final

28 July 1925

Arbeiter-Turn- und Sportbund (Germany)	2–0	(Finland) Finnish Workers' Sports Federation

Waldstadion, Frankfurt am Main
Attendance: 40,000

Squad: Asser Dammert, Reino Fri, Ernst Grönlund, Lauri Heinonen, Kaarlo Lehto, Viljo Lehto, Yrjö Lehtonen, Valter Lundström, Emil Nylund, L. Posti, Eino Rantanen, Aarne Rantanen, Vieno Vuorenpää, Viljo Vuorinen.

=== 1928 Moscow Spartakiad ===
Preliminary round

Finnish Workers' Sports Federation (Finland)	4–0	(Soviet Union) Volga region

Moscow

Siberia region (Soviet Union)	2–3	(Finland) Finnish Workers' Sports Federation

Moscow

Finnish Workers' Sports Federation (Finland)	5–1	(United Kingdom) British Workers' Sports Federation
Eero Ronkanen; Ernst Grönlund	1928 Spartakiad

Moscow

Federación Roja del Deporte (Uruguay)	3–1	(Finland) Finnish Workers' Sports Federation
	1928 Spartakiad	Sneti

Moscow

3rd place match

Byelorussian SSR	1–2	(Finland) Finnish Workers' Sports Federation
	1928 Spartakiad	Eero Ronkanen; Ernst Grönlund

Moscow

Squad: Väinö Forsten, Reino Fri, Ernst Grönlund, Viljo Halme, Frans Karjagin, Leevi Kekkonen, Tauno Kekkonen, Lauri Präktig, Eero Ronkanen, Armas Savolainen, Gunnar Therman, Brynolf Weckström.

=== 1931 Workers' Summer Olympiad ===
First round

22 July 1931

Amateur-Fußballvereine Österreichs (Austria)	5–1	(Finland) Finnish Workers' Sports Federation

Vienna

Consolation tournament

23 July 1931

Arbeidernes Idrettsforbund (Norway)	6–3	(Finland) Finnish Workers' Sports Federation

Vienna

Squad: Sulo Alava, Johan Alho, Paavo Eklund, Jaakko Itkonen, T. Itkonen, Erkki Pastinen, Akseli Pulkkinen, Einari Puukko, Eino Rantanen, Tauno Speeti, A. Suni, Viljo Vahtera, Kurt Weckström, Valfrid Virtanen.

=== 1937 Workers' Summer Olympiad ===
First round

Arbeiter-Turn- und Sportverbandes (Switzerland)	3–2	(Finland) Finnish Workers' Sports Federation

Antwerp

Consolation tournament

Finnish Workers' Sports Federation (Finland)	w/o	Hapoel

Antwerp
The match was abandoned on 1–1 result as the referee was attacked by the Palestinian team.

National Workers' Sports Association (United Kingdom)	2–1	(Finland) Finnish Workers' Sports Federation

Antwerp

Squad: Eino Flinck, Voitto Happonen, Eero Honkonen, Arvi Koponen, Axel Nyström, Arvo Pesonen, Akseli Pulkkinen, Toivo Pulkkinen, Eino Rantanen, Tauno Raunio, Lasse Salo, Reino Valkama, T. Valtanen.
