= Münzenberg (surname) =

Münzenberg is a German language surname. Notable people with the name include:

- Gottfried Münzenberg (1940–2024), German physicist
- Reinhold Münzenberg (1909–1986), German football player
- Willi Münzenberg (1889–1940), German Communist political activist and publisher
