= Viljo Halme =

Finnish footballer (1907-1981)

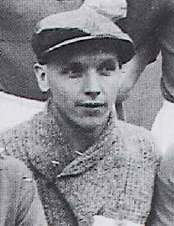

Personal information
- Full name: Karl Viljo Halme
- Date of birth: January 24, 1907
- Place of birth: Helsinki, Grand Duchy of Finland
- Date of death: October 21, 1981 (aged 74)
- Place of death: Helsinki, Finland
- Position: Goalkeeper

Senior career*
Years	Team	Apps	(Gls)
1923–1929	Jyry	–	(–)
1931–1935	HJK	49	(0)
1936–1941	HPS	58	(0)

International career
1932–1939	Finland	30	(0)
- * Club domestic league appearances and goals

Karl Viljo Halme (24 January 1907 – 21 October 1981) was a Finnish football goalkeeper. He earned 30 caps for the Finland national football team and was a member of the Finland squad at the 1936 Summer Olympics. Halme is considered one of the all-time best goalkeepers of Finland.

== Career ==
Halme started his career in the Helsinki working class side Jyry, playing in the Finnish Workers' Sports Federation (TUL) Championship series. Due to the 1918 Civil War, Finnish football was divided, TUL and the Finnish Football Association (SPL) had their own leagues and the national team was composed of SPL players only.

Halme represented the TUL football team at the 1928 Summer Spartakiad in Moscow, although the Social Democratic TUL had forbid its athletes to participate in the games of the Communist Red Sports International. All athletes who competed at the Spartakiad were dismissed from TUL, and Halme was left without a team.

In 1931, Halme switched to the ″bourgeoisie″ HJK Helsinki, which made him eligible for the national team. Halme debuted for Finland against Sweden in October 1932. In the Finland squad at the 1936 Summer Olympics, Halme was one of the eight former TUL players who had defected to the Finnish Football Association's side.

== Club honours ==
- Finnish Workers' Sports Federation Championship: 1927
