= Ludwig Goldbrunner =

German footballer

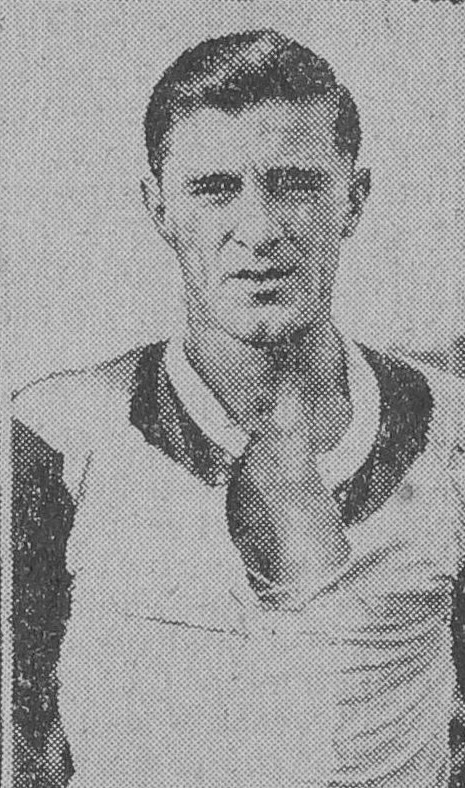

Personal information
- Date of birth: 5 March 1908
- Place of birth: Munich, Kingdom of Bavaria, German Empire
- Date of death: 26 September 1981 (aged 73)
- Position: Defender

Senior career*
Years	Team	Apps	(Gls)
1927–1945	Bayern Munich		

International career
1933–1940	Germany	39	(0)

Managerial career
- 1938–1943: Bayern Munich
- 1945–1946: TSV 1860 München
- * Club domestic league appearances and goals

Ludwig Goldbrunner (5 March 1908 – 26 September 1981) was a German footballer. He began playing for his home club Bayern Munich in 1927, with whom he won the German championship in 1932.

== Career ==
Goldbrunner played as a centre half 39 times for the Germany national team between 1933 and 1940. He played in the 1938 France World Cup but promptly retired from the team after a 4 – 2 defeat against Switzerland. He was also part of Germany's squad at the 1936 Summer Olympics.

He became known in 1937 as one of the "Breslau-Elf" (Breslau Eleven) players, after they thrashed Denmark with an 8:0 score.

He was the center half of Bayern Munich's first great side, the 1932 German champions. A year later, Goldbrunner debuted for Germany national team against Switzerland. In the following years Goldbrunner took turns with Reinhold Münzenberg at the center half position, but by 1936 with Münzenberg having moved to the left back position, Goldbrunner settled at the center half position permanently. During his international career, Goldbrunner played against the best center forwards in European football, namely England's George Camsell, Portugal's Fernando Peyroteo, Belgium's Raymond Braine, France's Paul Nicolas, Italy's Silvio Piola and Spain's Isidro Lángara. Remarkably, only George Camsell managed to score against Goldbrunner.

When the best Bayern Munich team at the time was drawn up, he was in the shortlist and at most games would have him on the bench, which was a great achievement at the time.
