= Walter Rose (footballer) =

German footballer (1912–1989)

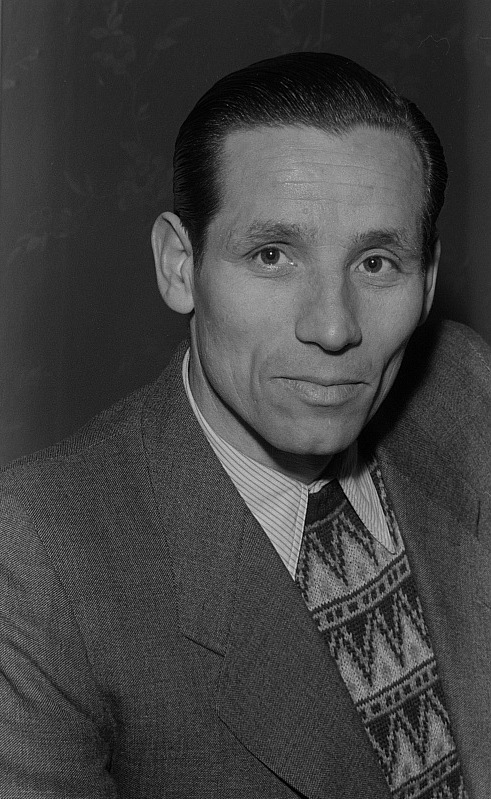
- Rose in 1954

Personal information
- Full name: Walter Rose
- Date of birth: 5 November 1912
- Place of birth: Leipzig, German Empire
- Date of death: 27 December 1989 (aged 77)
- Place of death: Leipzig, East Germany
- Position: Defender

Youth career
- 1929–1930: FC Viktoria 06 Leutzsch
- 1930–1932: KG Rote Sporteinheit Leutzsch

Senior career*
Years	Team	Apps	(Gls)
1932–1940	SpVgg Leipzig		
1940–1942	PSV Chemnitz		
1945–1949	SG Lindenau-Hafen		
1949–1954	Industrie/Chemie Leipzig	152	(26)

International career
1937	Germany	1	(0)

Managerial career
- 1952–1953: Chemie Leipzig
- * Club domestic league appearances and goals

Walter Rose (5 November 1912 – 27 December 1989) was a German footballer who played as a defender and made one appearance for the Germany national team.

== Career ==
Rose earned his first and only cap for the Germany national team on 29 August 1937 in a 1938 World Cup qualification match against Estonia. The home match, which took place in Königsberg, finished as a 4–1 win for Germany.

== Personal life ==
Rose died on 27 December 1989 at the age of 77. His grandson, Marco Rose, was also a footballer and later a manager.

== Career statistics ==
=== International ===
Appearances and goals by national team and year
National team	Year	Apps	Goals
Germany	1937	1	0
Total		1	0
