= Sulo Salo =

Finnish footballer (1909–1995)

Personal information
- Date of birth: 16 November 1909
- Date of death: 12 May 1995 (aged 85)

International career
Years	Team	Apps	(Gls)
1937–1941	Finland	3	(0)

Sulo Salo (16 November 1909 – 12 May 1995) was a Finnish footballer. He played in three matches for the Finland national football team from 1937 to 1941. He was also part of Finland's team for their qualification matches for the 1938 FIFA World Cup.
