= Lauri Taipale =

Finnish footballer (1911–1950)

Personal information
- Date of birth: 11 September 1911
- Date of death: 21 February 1950 (aged 38)

International career
Years	Team	Apps	(Gls)
1934–1937	Finland	9	(0)

Lauri Taipale (11 September 1911 – 21 February 1950) was a Finnish footballer. He played in nine matches for the Finland national football team from 1934 to 1937. He was also part of Finland's team for their qualification matches for the 1938 FIFA World Cup.
