= Marco Rose =

German football manager (born 1976)

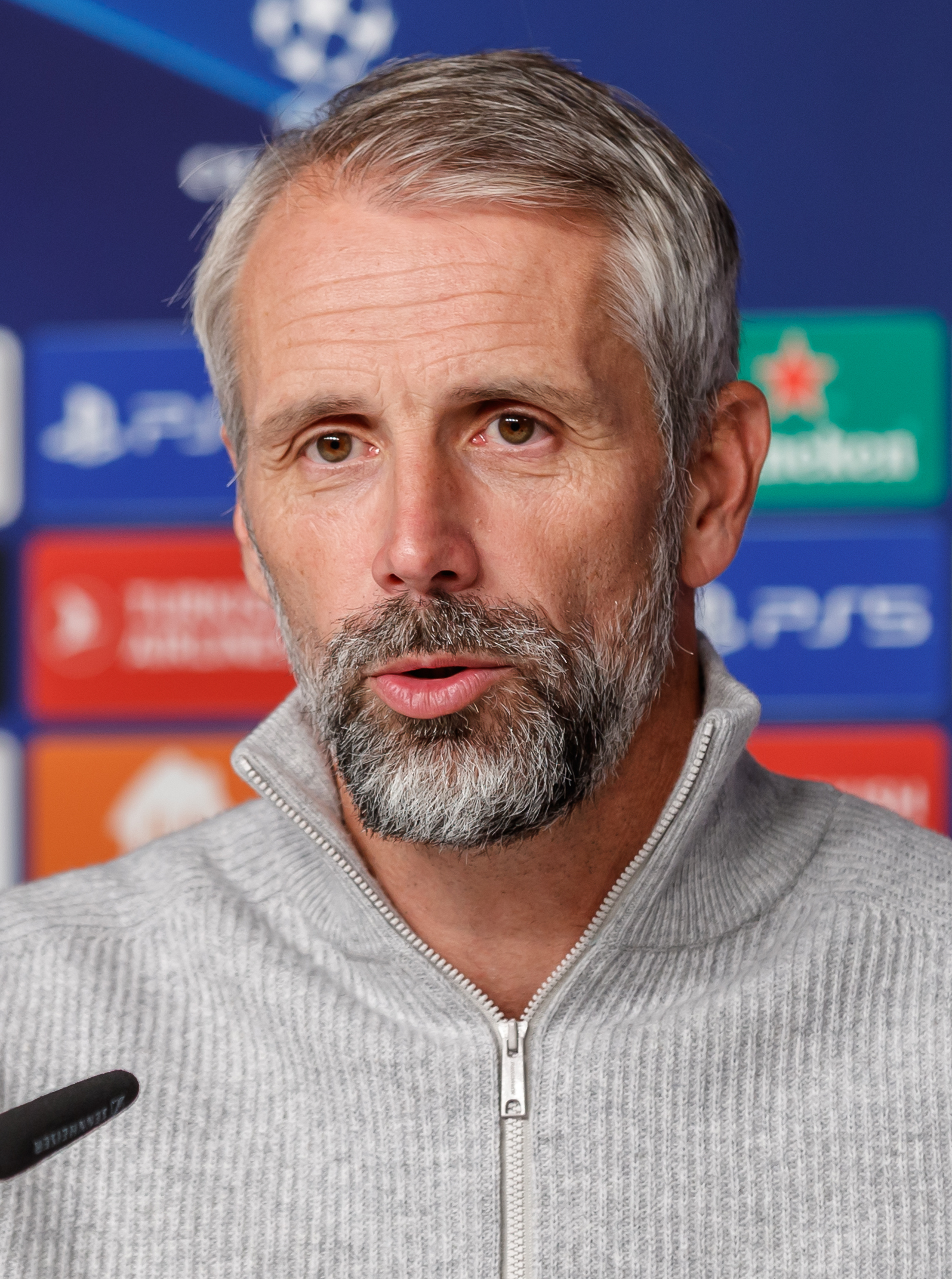
- Rose as manager of RB Leipzig in 2023

Personal information
- Date of birth: 11 September 1976 (age 50)
- Place of birth: Leipzig, East Germany
- Height: 1.87 m (6 ft 2 in)
- Position: Defender

Team information
- Current team: Bournemouth (head coach)

Youth career
- Rotation Leipzig
- 1987–1995: VfB Leipzig

Senior career*
Years	Team	Apps	(Gls)
1995–2000	VfB Leipzig	57	(5)
2000–2002	Hannover 96	24	(0)
2002–2010	Mainz 05	150	(6)
2010–2011	Mainz 05 II	41	(1)
Total		272	(12)

Managerial career
- 2012–2013: Lokomotive Leipzig
- 2017–2019: Red Bull Salzburg
- 2019–2021: Borussia Mönchengladbach
- 2021–2022: Borussia Dortmund
- 2022–2025: RB Leipzig
- 2026–: Bournemouth
- * Club domestic league appearances and goals

Marco Rose (born 11 September 1976) is a German professional football manager and a former player who is currently the head coach of Premier League club Bournemouth.

He coached Mainz 05's second team, then Lokomotive Leipzig, before going through the ranks at Red Bull Salzburg. After winning the UEFA Youth League, he became the first-team manager in 2017, winning the Austrian Bundesliga in both of his seasons and the Austrian Cup for a double in 2019. He then managed in the German Bundesliga at Borussia Mönchengladbach, Borussia Dortmund and RB Leipzig, where he won the DFB Pokal in 2023. Rose was appointed head coach of Premier League club Bournemouth in 2026.

== Playing career ==
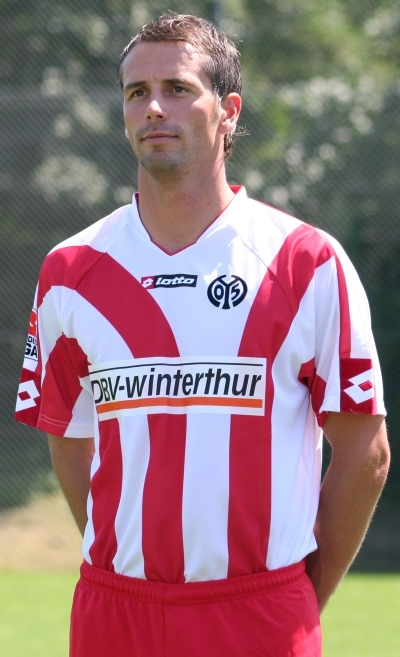
Rose playing for Mainz 05 in 2006

The defender started his career at Rotation Leipzig, then joined Lokomotive Leipzig, later renamed VfB Leipzig. Rose played ten games in the second flight for VfB. In 2000, Rose joined Hannover 96. When Hannover reached promotion to the Bundesliga in 2002, Rose went to Jürgen Klopp's Mainz 05 on loan. When Mainz won promotion to the Bundesliga, they signed Rose permanently. Rose retired after 199 games for Mainz's first and second team. He scored seven goals, three of them in the Bundesliga.

== Coaching career ==
=== Early career ===
Rose started his career as assistant coach and player of Mainz's second team in the 2010–11 season. For the 2012–13 season, he joined Lokomotive Leipzig, but terminated his contract after one season.

=== Red Bull Salzburg ===
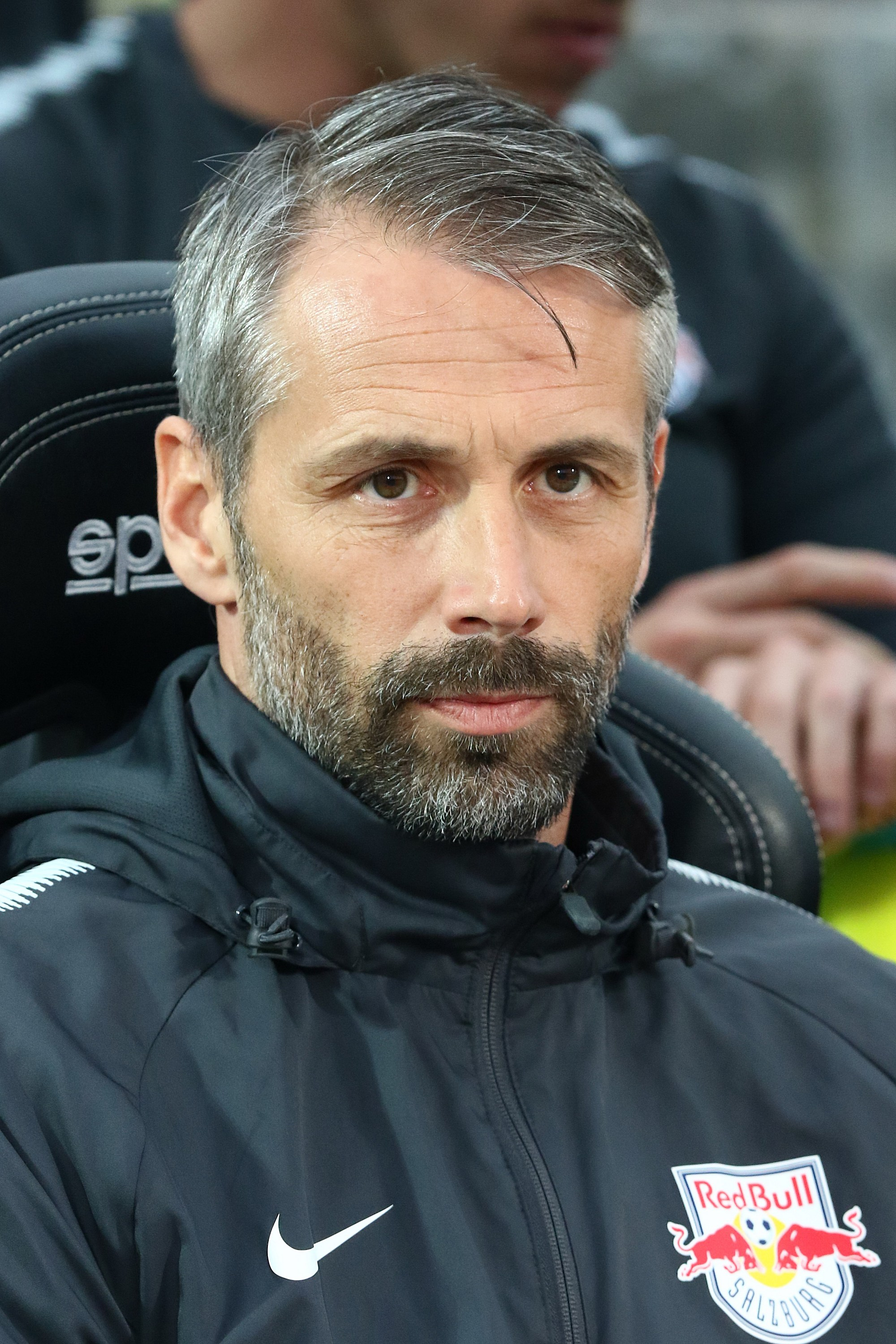
Rose managing Red Bull Salzburg in 2018

Rose joined Red Bull Salzburg's U16 team in the 2013–14 season. When U18 coach Thomas Letsch joined FC Liefering, Rose succeeded him as U18 coach. The team won the Austrian U18 championship in his first season and the UEFA Youth League in April 2017 beating Benfica 2–1 in the final.

For the 2017–18 season, Rose succeeded Óscar García as head coach of RB Salzburg. In his first season, the team won the Austrian championship and reached the semi-finals of the Europa League, beating teams like Borussia Dortmund and Lazio. The final of the Austrian cup against Sturm Graz was lost. In the second season, RB Salzburg started the league with ten wins which broke the previous record of the league. In the Europa League, they reached the quarter final against Napoli. Rose never lost a home game during his tenure as head coach of Salzburg.

=== Borussia Mönchengladbach ===
For the 2019–20 season, Rose joined Borussia Mönchengladbach. Gladbach led the Bundesliga table after 14 games and went into the winter break in second place, and eventually finished fourth. However, they were eliminated from the Europa League at the group stage, losing their opening game 4–0 to Wolfsberger AC, Gladbach's highest European defeat at home.

In the 2020–21 UEFA Champions League, Gladbach beat Shakhtar Donetsk 6–0 and 4–0 in the group stage, finishing in second place ahead of Inter Milan. They were eliminated in the first knockout round by Manchester City.

On 15 February 2021, the club announced that Rose would leave at the end of the season to join Borussia Dortmund. Gladbach's form dipped after the announcement, losing four games in a row, and ultimately finished 8th, failing to qualify for Europe.

=== Borussia Dortmund ===
In the 2021–22 season, Rose led Borussia Dortmund to a second-place finish in the Bundesliga but failed to qualify from their Champions League group and were then eliminated from the Europa League by Rangers. After one season in charge, the club and Rose mutually agreed to part ways on 20 May 2022.

=== RB Leipzig ===
On 8 September 2022, Rose was appointed as new RB Leipzig head coach. Two days later, he won his first match 3–0 against his former club Borussia Dortmund in the Bundesliga. On 3 June 2023, he won his first title at the club, after a 2–0 victory over Eintracht Frankfurt in the DFB-Pokal final. A month later, on 28 July, he extended his contract until 2025. In June 2024, he signed a one-year extension until 2026.

Rose was sacked by the RB Leipzig board on 30 March 2025 after heavily underperforming in the Bundesliga and UEFA Champions League.

=== Bournemouth ===
On 20 April 2026, it was announced that Rose would succeed Andoni Iraola as head coach of Premier League club Bournemouth for the 2026–27 season, with Iraola deciding to depart the club after three years, at the end of his contract. He officially began work in the role on 1 June 2026. Marco Rose's first official match as the head coach of AFC Bournemouth was a 2-1 away defeat against Manchester City on 23 August 2026.

== Managerial style ==
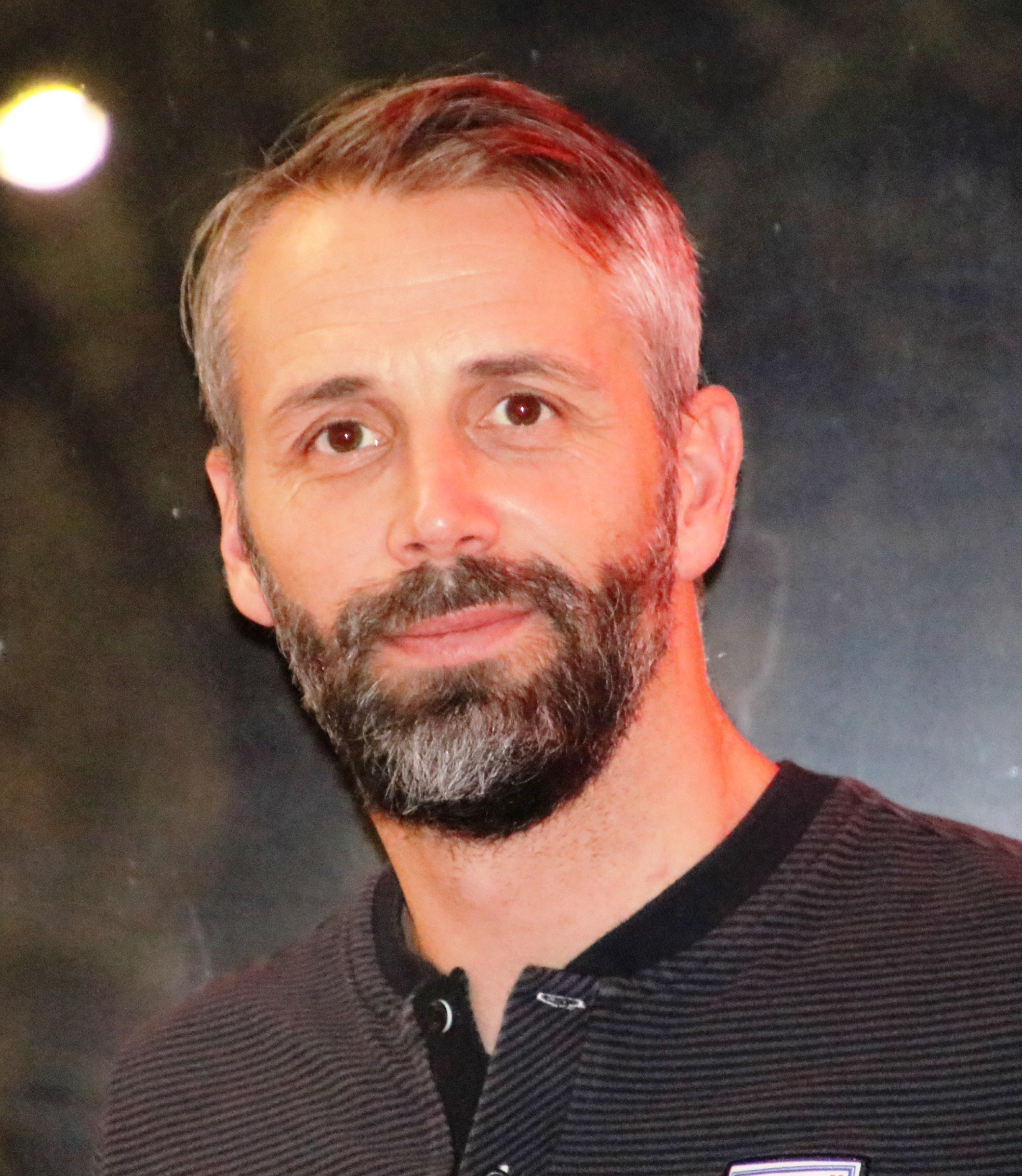
Rose in 2017

Rose has described the basic ideas of his playing style as "emotionality, hunger and being active". "We want to be very active against the ball, sprint a lot. We want to win high balls and have short ways to the goal. We don't want to play high and wide, but fast, dynamic and actively forward."

He has stated his preference for a 4–4–2 diamond, saying "I've always played a diamond when I've had the opportunity to do it, bringing in two strikers. Our system, even when we play with all three up front, is something like a diamond." However, he has also used 4–3–3 and 4–2–3–1 formations at Mönchengladbach.

== Personal life ==
Rose is a Christian, who joined the faith as an adult. He has a daughter with his wife, Nikola Pietzsch, a former German handball player with whom he has been in a relationship for over 25 years. Rose's grandfather, Walter Rose, was also a footballer and played once for the Germany national team in 1937.

== Managerial statistics ==
As of match played 21 November 2026

Managerial record by team and tenure
Team	From	To	Record								Ref.
Team	From	To	G	W	D	L	GF	GA	GD	Win %	Ref.
Lokomotive Leipzig	1 July 2012	1 June 2013	30	9	9	12	35	39	−4	30.00	
Red Bull Salzburg	16 June 2017	30 June 2019	114	81	23	10	269	88	+181	71.05	
Borussia Mönchengladbach	1 July 2019	30 June 2021	88	41	19	28	169	122	+47	46.59	
Borussia Dortmund	1 July 2021	20 May 2022	46	27	4	15	106	74	+32	58.70	
RB Leipzig	8 September 2022	30 March 2025	128	72	23	33	260	153	+107	56.25	
Bournemouth	1 June 2026	Present	17	11	3	3	36	16	+20	64.71	
Career Total			423	241	81	101	875	492	+383	56.97	

== Honours ==
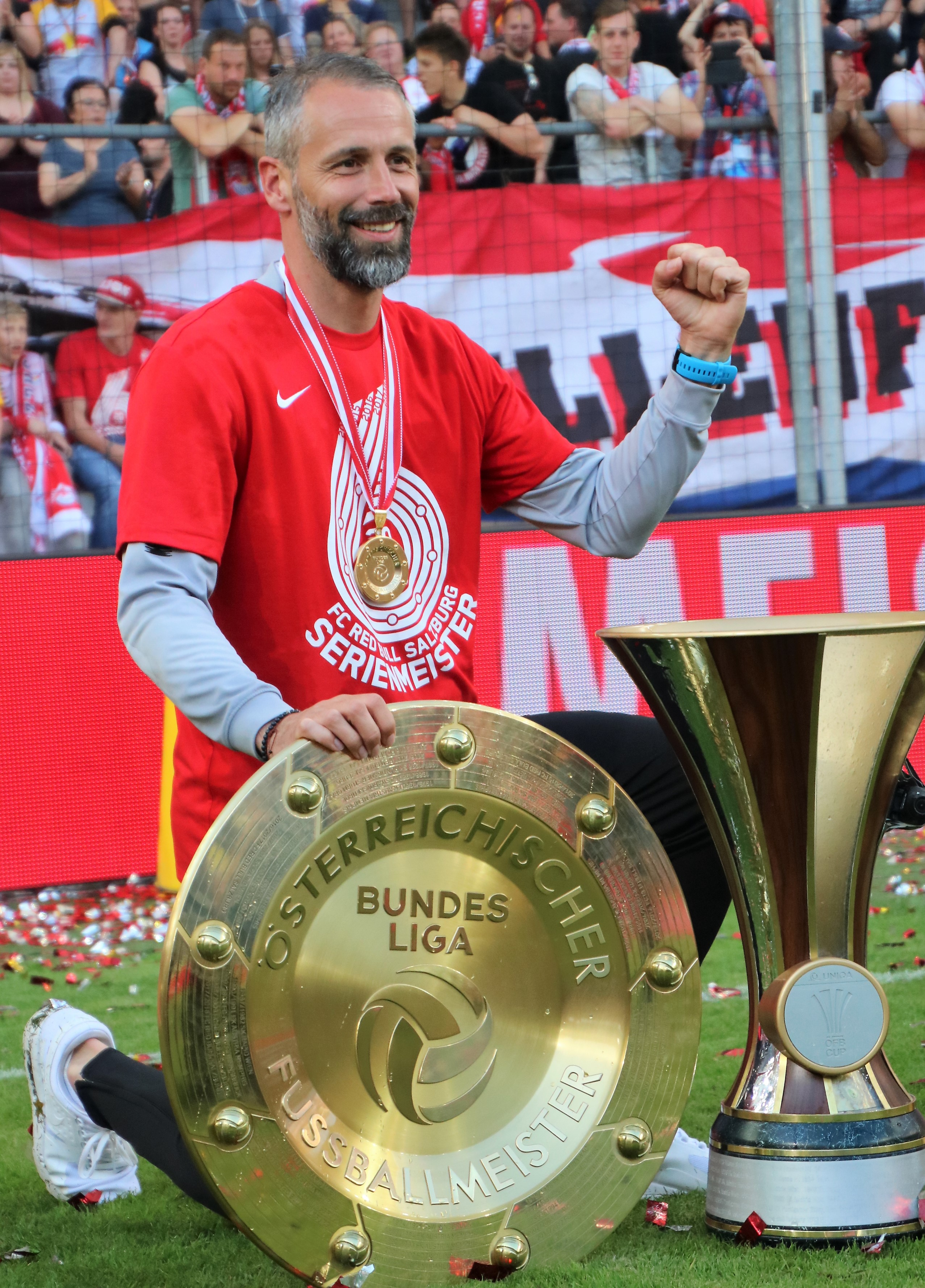
Rose with Red Bull Salzburg's Austrian Bundesliga and Austrian Cup trophies in 2019

=== Player ===
Hannover 96

- 2. Bundesliga: 2001–02

=== Manager ===
Red Bull Salzburg Youth

- UEFA Youth League: 2016–17

Red Bull Salzburg

- Austrian Bundesliga: 2017–18, 2018–19
- Austrian Cup: 2018–19

RB Leipzig

- DFB-Pokal: 2022–23
- DFL-Supercup: 2023
