= Ernst Lehner =

German footballer

Personal information
- Full name: Ernst Lehner
- Date of birth: 7 November 1912
- Place of birth: Augsburg, German Empire
- Date of death: 10 January 1986 (aged 73)
- Place of death: Aschaffenburg, West Germany
- Position: Striker

Senior career*
| Years | Team | Apps | (Gls) |
| 1929–1940 | Schwaben Augsburg | | |
| 1940–1943 | BW 1890 Berlin | 1 | (0) |
| 1943–1947 | Schwaben Augsburg | | |
| 1947–1951 | Viktoria Aschaffenburg | 40 | (4) |

International career
| 1933–1942 | Germany | 65 | (31) |

Managerial career
- 1945–1947: Schwaben Augsburg (player-manager)
- 1950–1953: Viktoria Aschaffenburg
- 1959–1961: Viktoria Aschaffenburg
- 1961–1966: Darmstadt 98
Medal record
Men's football
Representing Germany
FIFA World Cup
| Third place | 1934 Italy |
- * Club domestic league appearances and goals

Ernst Lehner (7 November 1912 – 10 January 1986) was a German footballer. He was born in Augsburg and died in Aschaffenburg.

== International ==
He played for the Germany national football team in the 1934 FIFA World Cup and the 1938 FIFA World Cup. In total, he made 65 appearances and scored 31 goals for the national team. Lehner was a member of the Breslau Eleven that beat Denmark 8–0 in Breslau in 1937 and went on to win 10 out of 11 games played during that year. His position was that of an outside right. He was also part of Germany's squad at the 1936 Summer Olympics.

== Career ==
Ernst Lehner was one of the paciest and most skilled outside rights of the mid-/late-1930s. His specialty was corner kicks; gaining a reputation for often trying (and succeeding) to convert them directly. In a 1937 World Cup qualifier against Estonia, with Germany one goal behind at half-time, Germany collected 18 corner kicks in the second half, two of which Lehner converted directly and two other corners of his were headed into the Estonian goal by Jupp Gauchel (Germany won 4–1). Lehner was considered to have been one of the best outside rights of the 1934 World Cup. Others touted him as "the best non-professional player in Europe" (professionalism was not allowed in Germany in the 1930s). He was one of the players selected to represent Western Europe against Central Europe in 1937.

== Praise ==
In his 1978 book "Fussball", Helmut Schön, manager of the West Germany national team (1964–1978), characterised Lehner as follows:

"His way of playing as an outside forward was the way I always wanted outside forwards to play: always ready to take up the ball, to stretch the game from outline to outline, a great dribbler and two-footed shooter."
