= Gustav Wetterström =

Swedish footballer

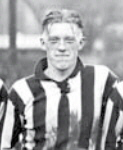
- Gustav Wetterström with IK Sleipner by the mid-1930s

Personal information
- Full name: Karl Gustav Evert Wetterström
- Date of birth: October 15, 1911
- Place of birth: Norrköping, Sweden
- Date of death: November 16, 1991 (aged 80)
- Place of death: Norrköping, Sweden
- Position: Forward

Senior career*
Years	Team	Apps	(Gls)
- IK Sleipner

International career
1934–1938	Sweden	7	(7)
- * Club domestic league appearances and goals

Karl Gustav Evert Wetterström (15 October 1911 – 16 November 1991) was a Swedish footballer who played as a striker.

He played for IK Sleipner and the Sweden men's national football team, for whom he appeared in the 1938 FIFA World Cup. He scored a hat trick in Sweden's 8-0 victory over Cuba, although many sources outside of FIFA have credited him with scoring 4 goals in that match.

== Career statistics ==
=== International ===
Appearances and goals by national team and year
National team	Year	Apps	Goals
Sweden	1934	1	0
Sweden	1935	0	0
Sweden	1936	0	0
Sweden	1937	3	4
Sweden	1938	3	3
Total		7	7

Scores and results list Sweden's goal tally first, score column indicates score after each Wetterström goal.

List of international goals scored by Gustav Wetterström
No.	Date	Venue	Opponent	Score	Result	Competition	Ref.
1	20 June 1937	Råsunda Stadium, Stockholm, Sweden	Estonia	5–2	7–2	1938 FIFA World Cup qualification	
2	20 June 1937	Råsunda Stadium, Stockholm, Sweden	Estonia	6–2	7–2	1938 FIFA World Cup qualification	
3	20 June 1937	Råsunda Stadium, Stockholm, Sweden	Estonia	7–2	7–2	1938 FIFA World Cup qualification	
4	23 June 1937	Stadion Wojska Polskiego, Warsaw, Poland	Poland	4–3	4–3	Friendly	
5	12 June 1938	Stade du Fort Carré, Antibes, France	Cuba	2–0	8–0	1938 FIFA World Cup	
6	12 June 1938	Stade du Fort Carré, Antibes, France	Cuba	3–0	8–0	1938 FIFA World Cup	
7	12 June 1938	Stade du Fort Carré, Antibes, France	Cuba	4–0	8–0	1938 FIFA World Cup	

== Honours ==
IK Sleipner

- Allsvenskan: 1937–1938
