= Paavo Salminen =

Finnish footballer (1911-1989)

Personal information
- Date of birth: 19 November 1911
- Place of birth: Helsinki, Finland
- Date of death: 27 April 1989 (aged 77)
- Place of death: Helsinki, Finland
- Position: Goalkeeper

Senior career*
Years	Team	Apps	(Gls)
1934-1941	Helsingin Toverit	95	(0)

International career
1936–1939	Finland	11	(0)
1936	Finland Olympic	1	(0)
	Finland B	2	(0)
- * Club domestic league appearances and goals

Paavo Salminen (19 November 1911 – 27 April 1989) was a Finnish footballer. He competed in the men's tournament at the 1936 Summer Olympics. He spent his club career playing for Helsingin Toverit.
