= Helmuth Räästas =

Estonian footballer

Personal information
- Full name: Helmuth-Voldemar Räästas
- Date of birth: 20 January 1903
- Place of birth: Tallinn, Governorate of Estonia, Russian Empire

Senior career*
Years	Team	Apps	(Gls)
- Tallinna Kalev

International career
1926–1937	Estonia	20	(3)
- * Club domestic league appearances and goals

Helmuth Räästas (born 20 January 1903, date of death unknown) was an Estonian footballer. He played in 20 matches for the Estonia national football team from 1926 to 1937. He was also named in Estonia's squad for the Group 1 qualification tournament for the 1938 FIFA World Cup.

Räästas' whereabouts after 1945 are unknown.
