= Eino Lahti =

Finnish footballer (1915-2003)

Personal information
- Date of birth: 18 May 1915
- Place of birth: Vaasa, Finland
- Date of death: 13 October 2003 (aged 88)
- Place of death: Pori, Finland
- Position: Defender

Senior career*
Years	Team	Apps	(Gls)
1933-1938	Vaasan Palloseura		(1)
1939-1948	Helsingin Palloseura		(0)
1949	RU-38		(0)

International career
1936–1945	Finland	21	(0)
1936	Finland Olympic	1	(0)
- * Club domestic league appearances and goals

Eino Lahti (18 May 1915 – 13 October 2003) was a Finnish footballer. He competed in the men's tournament at the 1936 Summer Olympics. At club level he played for Helsingin Palloseura, Vaasan Palloseura and RU-38. In Mestaruussarja he played a total of 88 games scoring once, 41 games and 1 goal for VPS and 47 games for HPS. He also played in second division.
