= Elmar Tepp =

Estonian footballer

Personal information
- Full name: Elmar Leonhard Tepp
- Date of birth: 30 April 1913
- Place of birth: Tallinn, Governorate of Estonia, Russian Empire
- Date of death: 11 May 1943 (aged 30)
- Place of death: Kalinin, Russian SFSR, Soviet Union

Senior career*
Years	Team	Apps	(Gls)
- Tallinna Puhkekodu

International career
1937–1940	Estonia	17	(0)
- * Club domestic league appearances and goals

Elmar Leonhard Tepp (30 April 1913 – 11 May 1943) was an Estonian footballer. He played in 16 matches for the Estonia national football team from 1937 to 1940. He was also named in Estonia's squad for the Group 1 qualification tournament for the 1938 FIFA World Cup.

Tepp was conscripted into the Red Army in 1941 and became a prisoner of war of the Germans during the Battle of Velikiye Luki along with teammates Heinrich Uukkivi and Richard Kuremaa. He was released in a later Soviet advance and subsequently sentenced to death by Soviet authorities, which was later commuted to a fifteen-year prison sentence. He died in prison in Kalinin, Russia in 1943.
