= Ferdinand Fabra =

German football manager

Personal information
- Date of birth: 8 October 1906
- Place of birth: Geseke, Province of Westphalia, Prussia, German Empire
- Date of death: 22 December 2007 (aged 101)
- Place of death: Hamburg, Germany

Managerial career
- Years: Team
- 1930–1931: VfB Coburg
- 1932–1933: Holstein Kiel
- 1933–: Eintracht Braunschweig
- 1935–1936: Germany (assistant)
- 1936–1937: Finland
- 1946–1947: Wolfenbütteler SV
- 1947–1948: Borussia Dortmund
- 1948–1950: Borussia Neunkirchen
- 1950–1951: Preußen Münster
- 1951–1952: SpVgg Fürth
- 1952–1953: Wuppertaler SV

Ferdinand Fabra (8 October 1906 – 22 December 2007) was a German football manager.

He coached the Finland national team from 1936 to 1937 and was the team's manager at the 1936 Summer Olympics in Berlin. During Fabra's period Finland played eight games with one victory, one draw and six losses.
