= Josef Gauchel =

German footballer

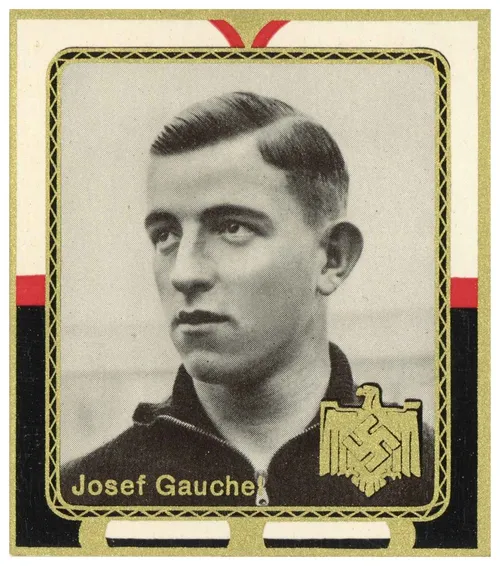
- A portrait of Joseph (Jupp) Gauchel on a trading card

Personal information
- Full name: Josef Gauchel
- Date of birth: 11 September 1916
- Place of birth: Germany
- Date of death: 21 March 1963 (aged 46)
- Position: Forward

Senior career*
Years	Team	Apps	(Gls)
1932–1952	TuS Neuendorf		

International career
1936–1942	Germany	16	(13)
- * Club domestic league appearances and goals

Josef "Jupp" Gauchel (11 September 1916 – 21 March 1963) was a German football striker. In the 1930s, he played for TuS Neuendorf (now TuS Koblenz) and was an active member of the squad.

Between 1936 and 1942, he played 16 times for Germany, and scored 13 goals. He went to the 1938 World Cup in France as a player, scoring once. He was also part of Germany's squad at the 1936 Summer Olympics.

== National player, 1936 to 1942 ==
"Jupp" Gauchel was an athletic, enthusiastic, strong header, with a fast start and a hard shot striker. Reichs coach Otto Nerz invited the Neuendorf striker hope - he had already attracted attention in two Gau selection games in the Reichsbundpokal of 1935 for the Middle Rhine - in May 1936 to sighting games for the Olympic Summer Games 1936 in Berlin against the English professional team Everton FC. From the 9th to the 24th In May, the man from Moselle and Rhine was used in four hard games against Everton in Hamburg, Duisburg, Frankfurt and Nuremberg and was able to convince not only with two goals. Nerz then invited him to the final three-week course in July and nominated the still 19-year-old without international experience for the Olympic football tournament in August 1936 in Berlin.

Gauchel made his debut in the national team on the 4th. August 1936 in Berlin at the preliminary round of the Olympics against Luxembourg. He stormed to the half right next to Elbern, Hohmann, Urban and Simetsreiter and scored two goals in the 9:0 canter victory. Unfortunately, the tournament was over for the convincing debutant, as he was replaced by Otto Siffling in the intermediate match against Norway, which was lost with 0:2 goals. Before Gauchel was allowed to wear the eagle jersey again in an important international match, the so-called Breslau-Elf was created on the 16th. May 1937 by the 8:0 victory against Denmark. He had his fourth international appearance on the 29th. August 1937 at the World Cup qualifying match in Königsberg against Estonia. With two goals, he helped the German team achieve a 4:1 success. Instead of the injured director Fritz Szepan, Sepp Herberger played at the short-term "unofficial international match" on the 3rd. April 1938 in Vienna against Austria Gauchel on half-left. After the invasion of German units of the Wehrmacht on the 12th. March 1938 in Austria, the game was far more important than just that of a usual international match, especially since the Football World Cup was already held in France three months later in June 1938.

At the anniversary international match (150. International match of the DFB) and last international match before the World Cup on the 14th. May 1938 in Berlin against England, coach Herberger competed almost completely with the "Breslau-Elf", only Gauchel for Siffling and Pesser for Urban he took new to the team. In the 6:3 success of the English, the German defense simply did not get a grip on the attack of the "teacher" - Matthews, Robinson, Broome, Goulden, Bastin. Gauchel scored the 2:4 goal shortly before the half-time whistle. Immediately after the international match, three training games were played against Aston Villa. At the only victory for the German team, on the 18th. May in Düsseldorf with 2:1 goals, Hahnemann, Gellesch, Gauchel, Szepan and Pesser formed the attack. Gauchel and Pesser were the goal scorers of the Herberger eleven. One week after the clear 3:6 home defeat of the German eleven against England, the World Cup preliminary round opponent defeated Switzerland - led by captain Severino Minelli and the "hanging" center forward Alfred Bickel - on the 21st. May in Zurich the British with 2:1 goals and thus caused additional unrest in the German ranks. Gauchel contested on the 4th. June at the World Cup preliminary round match against the Swiss his seventh international match. In the 29th. Minute he turned a flat entry from left winger Pesser to the 1-0 lead. The game ended 1:1 after extra time and the repeat game was on the 9th. June. In the 2:4 defeat against Switzerland and the elimination from the further World Cup tournament, Herberger renounced Gauchel.

In the first international match after the World Cup 1938, on the 18th. September 1938 in Chemnitz against Poland, the man from Neuendorf indicated with his three goals in the German 4-1 success how valuable he could be for the national team. A sporting highlight was the tenth international match for Gauchel. On the 26th In March 1939, the German eleven challenged the reigning world champion Italy in Florence. In the attack, coach Herberger relied on Lehner, Hahnemann, Gauchel, Schön and Pesser. The duels with midrunner Michele Andreolo and the defender couple Alfredo Foni and Pietro Rava showed the Neuendorf storm leader how the real world class worked. Italy won the game with 3:2 goals.

With his 16th International match on 19 July 1942 in Sofia against Bulgaria, the international career of "Jupp" Gauchel ended. With the attacking formation Herbert Burdenski, Karl Decker, Fritz Walter, Gauchel and Willi Arlt, the game was won with 3:0 goals. He again belonged to the last DFB course in February 1943, which also included on the 14th. February belonged to a training match against Hessen-Nassau. After that, due to the circumstances of the advanced Second World War, it was no longer possible for Reich coach Herberger to get his national players released for courses.

In addition to the appointments to the national football team, "Jupp" Gauchel played twelve games in the Gau selection of the Middle Rhine in the Reichsbundpokal from 1935 to 1939 and scored seven goals.

== Player coach, 1946 to 1954 ==
When football started rolling again after the Second World War, the ex-national player worked as a player coach at his home club TuS Neuendorf from 1946/47. On 30 June 1946 he was active in the attack in the representative game in Cologne for West Germany against the southern selection. The blue-blacks from Neuendorf moved into the final rounds for the German football championship in 1948 and 1950 and won the vice-championship in the Fußball-Oberliga Südwest in 1952 and 1953. After the victory in the final match on the 20th. June 1953 in the Southwest German Cup against Eintracht Trier, the Gauchel team sat down in the first DFB Cup main round 1954 on the 2nd. August 1953 in front of 20,000 spectators in the Oberwerth Stadium with 2:1 goals against the 1. FC Nuremberg through - Gauchel played on half-left - and was thus in the semi-finals. The opponent was the VfB Stuttgart. On the 13th In December, the game ended in Stuttgart after extra time 2:2 draw. The repeat game was played on the 24th. March 1954 again in Stuttgart and there the team of coach Georg Wurzer prevailed against the eleven of player coach Gauchel with 2:0 goals. In both semi-finals, the old national player had participated in the attack of his team. The VfB won three weeks later with a 1:0 after extra time against the 1. FC Köln the DFB Cup 1953/54

== Trainer ==
Rudi Gutendorf remembers the player and coach "Jupp" Gauchel in Werner Skrentny's book about the Südwest Oberliga with the following words:

The then Reich coach Professor Nerz and his assistant Sepp Herberger called my role model, the Neuendorf Jupp Gauchel, to the national team in 1936. [...] When Jupp Gauchel was nominated for the national team, I was ten years old, and his vocation had a great influence on my life path. [...] When I turned 16 years old, I took part in the training of the 1. Team part. A few months later, I was allowed to participate in a big game in the Koblenz stadium for the first time, due to the time of war, in which players were constantly parked to the front. I can't say in words what excitement gripped me when I entered the stadium with national player Gauchel, who played next to me in the half-right position, where there were almost 15,000 spectators. [...] It was particularly valuable to me, and this should be for every active person in his first games, that I could play next to an understanding comrade like Jupp Gauchel, who eliminates the mistakes that you inevitably make as a beginner through his experience and skills and "serve" a ball that he could have booked just as well as his success. [...] Through regular training under Jupp Gauchel, we had great success after the Second World War. Gauchel did everything in training exactly as it had been taught to him in the national team. I was firmly convinced that it was the best training, took notes and scribbled sketches into a blue dime school booklet, which I still keep today like a relic. I still use a training form of Gauchel, since it is unsurpassed, to this day: eight against eight, across the court, without goals. If the opponent is in possession of the ball, everyone covers his personal opponent, sticks to him like a stamp. If his own team has the ball, he must detach himself from his personal opponent in a flash so that he can be played. Good and hard training with a radiant personality like Gauchel as a coach could move incredible things.

In the 1955/56 season, Gauchel trained the FV Engers in the Oberliga Südwest and then trained at his club, TuS Neuendorf, from 1957 to 1959. The connection between Gauchel and TuS Neuendorf ended with a serious rift. After the club and the chairman were punished by the football association for running a "black cash register", the alleged whistleblower was excluded from the club for "club-damaging behavior".

== Profession ==
For many years, Jupp Gauchel worked as an employee in a wine company before he later had his livelihood in the long-distance competition Rhine of the Sporttoto Rhineland-Palatinate. He died at the end of March 1963 as a result of a heart attack.

== Honours ==
In Koblenz-Oberwerth, the "Jupp-Gauchel-Straße", on which the Stadion Oberwerth is located, commemorates one of the best footballers in the club's or city's history.

== Literature ==
- Werner Skrentny (ed.): Fear of the devil in front of Erbsenberg. The history of the Oberliga Südwest 1946–1963. Klartext, Essen 1996, ISBN 3-88474-394-5.
- Wolfgang Schütz: Koblenzer Köpfe. People of the city's history - namesake for streets and squares. 2nd over-ed and over-edition. Publisher for advertising sheets, Mülheim-Kärlich 2005, p. 192.

Sporting positions
Preceded by Ernesto Belis	FIFA World Cup opening goal 1938	Succeeded by Ademir
