= Adolf Anier =

Estonian footballer

Personal information
- Date of birth: 15 August [O.S. 3 August] 1897
- Place of birth: Tallinn, Governorate of Estonia
- Date of death: 27 March 1945
- Place of death: Tallinn, then part of Estonian SSR, Soviet Union
- Position: Midfielder

Senior career*
Years	Team	Apps	(Gls)
1922	Tallinna JK		

International career
1922	Estonia	1	(0)
- * Club domestic league appearances and goals

Adolf Anier (15 August [O.S. 3 August] 1897 – 27 March 1945) was an Estonian footballer, who played for Estonia.

== International career ==
Anier made his sole appearance for Estonia on 11 August 1922 in a 10–2 loss against Finland.

== Personal ==
Adolf Anier is buried at the Metsakalmistu cemetery in Tallinn.
