= Ferdinand Murr =

Estonian footballer

Personal information
- Date of birth: 23 August 1912
- Place of birth: Tallinn, Governorate of Estonia, Russian Empire
- Date of death: 3 June 1978 (aged 65)
- Place of death: Gothenburg, Sweden

International career
Years	Team	Apps	(Gls)
1936–1938	Estonia	8	(0)

Ferdinand Murr (23 August 1912 – 3 June 1978) was an Estonian footballer. He played in eight matches for the Estonia national football team from 1936 to 1938. He was also named in Estonia's squad for the Group 1 qualification tournament for the 1938 FIFA World Cup.

In 1944, Murr fled the Soviet occupation of Estonia to Sweden, where he lived until his death.
