= Voldemar Peterson =

Estonian footballer

Personal information
- Date of birth: 24 April 1908
- Place of birth: Tallinn, Governorate of Estonia, Russian Empire
- Date of death: 16 April 1976 (aged 67)
- Place of death: Tallinn, then part of Estonian SSR, Soviet Union

Senior career*
Years	Team	Apps	(Gls)
- Tallinna JK

International career
1930–1938	Estonia	20	(0)
- * Club domestic league appearances and goals

Voldemar Peterson (24 April 1908 – 16 April 1976) was an Estonian footballer. He played in 20 matches for the Estonia national football team from 1930 to 1938. He was also named in Estonia's squad for the Group 1 qualification tournament for the 1938 FIFA World Cup.
