= Julius Kaljo =

Estonian footballer

Personal information
- Date of birth: 4 January 1910
- Place of birth: Tallinn, Estonia
- Date of death: 12 May 1954 (aged 44)
- Place of death: Tallinn, then part of Estonian SSR, Soviet Union

International career
Years	Team	Apps	(Gls)
1931–1938	Estonia	16	(2)

Julius Kaljo (4 January 1910 – 12 May 1954) was an Estonian footballer. He played in 16 matches for the Estonia national football team from 1931 to 1938. He was also named in Estonia's squad for the Group 1 qualification tournament for the 1938 FIFA World Cup.
