= Erwin Schädler =

German footballer

Personal information
- Date of birth: 8 April 1917
- Date of death: 1991
- Position: Midfielder

Senior career*
Years	Team	Apps	(Gls)
1926–1940	Ulmer FV 94		
1940–1942	Eintracht Frankfurt		
1943–1948	Eintracht Frankfurt / KSG Eintracht / FSV		
1948–1949	TSG Ulm 1846		
1949–1950	Eintracht Frankfurt		

International career
1937–1938	Germany	4	(0)
- * Club domestic league appearances and goals

Erwin Schädler (8 April 1917 – 1991) was a German international footballer.
