= Kurt Weckström =

Finnish footballer (1911-1983)

Personal information
- Full name: Kurt Gunnar Weckström
- Date of birth: 4 December 1911
- Place of birth: Helsinki, Grand Duchy of Finland
- Date of death: 7 January 1983 (aged 71)
- Place of death: Helsinki, Finland
- Position: Forward

Senior career*
Years	Team	Apps	(Gls)
1929–1931	Vesa	–	(–)
1931–1934	KIF	19	(4)
1935–1949	HJK	129	(37)

International career
1931–1943	Finland	35	(10)
- * Club domestic league appearances and goals

Kurt Gunnar Weckström (4 December 1911 – 7 January 1983) was a Finnish footballer. He earned 35 caps for the Finland national football team and was a member of the Finland squad at the 1936 Summer Olympics.

== Career ==
Weckström started his career in the Helsinki working class side Töölön Vesa, playing in the Finnish Workers' Sports Federation (TUL) Championship series. Due to the 1918 Civil War, Finnish football was divided, TUL and the Finnish Football Association (SPL) had their own leagues and the national team was composed of SPL players only.

Weckström won the TUL Championship title in 1930 and was a member of the TUL football team at the 1931 Workers' Summer Olympiad in Vienna. Soon after the Olympiad, he defected to the ″bourgeoisie″ KIF Helsinki, which made him eligible for the national team. Weckström debuted for Finland in October 1931 against Denmark. In the Finland squad at the 1936 Summer Olympics, he was one of the eight former TUL players who had defected to the Finnish Football Association side.

== Club honours ==
- Finnish Workers' Sports Federation Championship: 1930
- Finnish Championship: 1936, 1938
