= Egon Parbo =

Estonian footballer

Personal information
- Date of birth: 15 April 1910
- Place of birth: Tallinn, Governorate of Estonia, Russian Empire
- Date of death: 24 April 1942 (aged 32)
- Place of death: Sosva, Russian SFSR, Soviet Union

International career
Years	Team	Apps	(Gls)
1931–1939	Estonia	23	(1)

Egon Parbo (15 April 1910 – 24 April 1942) was an Estonian footballer. He played in 23 matches for the Estonia national football team from 1931 to 1939. He was also named in Estonia's squad for the Group 1 qualification tournament for the 1938 FIFA World Cup.

Parbo was arrested by NKVD agents during the Soviet occupation of Estonia in 1941 and died in a prison camp in Sverdlovsk Oblast, Russia in 1942.
