= Paul Janes =

German footballer

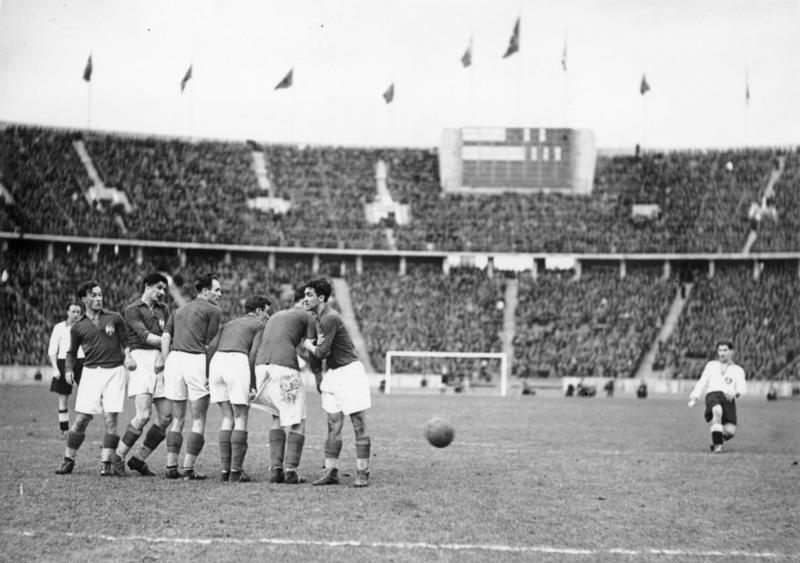
- Janes (r.) scores against Yugoslavia in 1939

Personal information
- Date of birth: 11 March 1912
- Place of birth: Küppersteg, Germany
- Date of death: 12 June 1987 (aged 75)
- Place of death: Düsseldorf, West Germany
- Positions: Right back; sweeper

Senior career*
Years	Team	Apps	(Gls)
1930–1944	Fortuna Düsseldorf		
1940–1941	→ Wilhelmshaven 05 (loan)		
1942–1944	→ Hamburger SV (loan)		
1943	→ Fortuna Glückstadt (loan)		
1945–1946	Fortuna Düsseldorf		
1946	→ Eintracht Frankfurt (loan)		
1946–1951	Fortuna Düsseldorf		

International career
1932–1942	Germany	71	(7)

Managerial career
- 1949–1951: Fortuna Düsseldorf
- Eintracht Trier
Medal record
Men's football
Representing Germany
FIFA World Cup
Third place	1934 Italy
- * Club domestic league appearances and goals

Paul Janes (11 March 1912 – 12 June 1987) was a German football player. He earned 71 caps and scored seven goals for the Germany national team from 1932 to 1942, and played in two World Cups: 1934 and 1938. Janes was a member of the Breslau Eleven that beat Denmark 8–0 in Breslau in 1937 and went on to win ten out 11 games played during that year.

The DFB lists him in the top 20 best German footballers of all time.

== Career ==
One of the best full backs of his era, Paul Janes established a record for most German caps which was not broken until 1970. Janes started out as a right half back, but during the 1934 World Cup he debuted as right back and stayed at that position for some four seasons before moving back into a sweeper role. He was injured during the 1936 Olympics and thus was spared of the embarrassing defeat of Germany by Norway. During the latter half of the 1930s, Germany possessed one of the strongest full back pairings in European football with Paul Janes on the right and Reinhold Münzenberg on the left side. Vittorio Pozzo, the coach of World Champions Italy, nominated Janes for a 1937 continental selection, but Janes could not participate due to an injury. One of Janes’ best assets was his powerful yet accurate shooting ability, which gave him the nickname "World Champion of Precision". His trademark were hard shots from all possible angles, his seven goals for Germany all came from either freekicks (four) or penalties (three). He was also a very calm player who kept his cool even in nerve-racking situations. Sepp Herberger said about Janes’ characteristics: "He rarely was caught off-guard on the pitch, as he had the ability to anticipate what the opponent was planning and he interpreted defensive play always as the first step in building up the next attack." Despite his calmness and overall cleverness, Janes was renowned for an extravaganza that he had imported from South America: He was the first German footballer to specialize in the acrobatic bicycle kick.

During World War II, Janes served in the Kriegsmarine and was able to continue playing, including spells as a wartime guest player with Wilhelmshaven 05 and Fortuna Glückstadt - both from towns with Kriegsmarine ports - as well as Hamburger SV where he played his last league match in November 1944. He captained Germany 31 times. Despite his age of 38, Janes almost would have had a comeback for Germany in the first international game after World War II in 1950, but he broke his foot shortly before and thus had to finish his career for good. Janes was known to be a silent man who did not divulge in too much talking. In 1934, he was asked about what it was like playing in the World Cup in Italy, his response was: "Warm".

His home team was Fortuna Düsseldorf, where he worked as trainer after the war. He also coached Eintracht Trier. During his playing career Düsseldorf dominated the (topflight) district division through the late 1920s and 1930s, winning the Western German football championship in 1931, the German football championship in 1933 and a German Vice-Championship in 1936. The club also appeared in the final of the Tschammerpokal, predecessor of today's German Cup, in 1937. The Paul-Janes-Stadion in Düsseldorf-Flingern is one of the grounds of Fortuna Düsseldorf (1930–1972 and 2002–2005), named after their famous player.

In his 1978 book "Fussball", Helmut Schön characterised Janes as follows:

"A man who could fight but also able to play technically brilliant. He was gifted with a simply phenomenal spin kick; he scored countless goals with freekicks from 30 or 40 meters with his glass-hard shot."

Sporting positions
Preceded by Fritz Szepan	Germany captain 1939–1942	Succeeded by Fritz Walter
