= Valter Neeris =

Estonian footballer

Personal information
- Date of birth: 21 March 1915
- Place of birth: Tallinn, Governorate of Estonia, Russian Empire
- Date of death: 30 December 1942 (aged 27)
- Place of death: Velikiye Luki, Russian SFSR, Soviet Union

International career
Years	Team	Apps	(Gls)
1934–1940	Estonia	36	(1)

Valter Neeris (21 March 1915 – 30 December 1942) was an Estonian footballer. He played in 34 matches for the Estonia national football team from 1934 to 1940. He was also named in Estonia's squad for the Group 1 qualification tournament for the 1938 FIFA World Cup.

Neeris was conscripted into the Red Army during World War II and killed in action during the Battle of Velikiye Luki in 1942.
