= Juho Matsalu =

Estonian footballer (1911–1987)

Personal information
- Date of birth: 22 August 1911
- Place of birth: Sindi, Governorate of Livonia, Russian Empire
- Date of death: 1 August 1987 (aged 75)
- Place of death: Tartu, Estonia

International career
Years	Team	Apps	(Gls)
1937–1940	Estonia	14	(0)

Juho Matsalu (22 August 1911 – 1 August 1987) was an Estonian footballer. He played in 14 matches for the Estonia national football team from 1937 to 1940. He was also named in Estonia's squad for the Group 1 qualification tournament for the 1938 FIFA World Cup.
