= Hans Berndt =

German footballer

Personal information
- Full name: Hans Berndt
- Date of birth: 30 October 1913
- Place of birth: Berlin-Spandau, Germany
- Date of death: 9 April 1988 (aged 74)
- Place of death: West Berlin, West Germany
- Position: Forward

Youth career
- 1924–1936: SC Staaken

Senior career*
Years	Team	Apps	(Gls)
1936–1943	Tennis Borussia Berlin		
1943–1944	VfB Königsberg		
1944–1953	Tennis Borussia Berlin		

International career
1937–1938	Germany	3	(2)
- * Club domestic league appearances and goals

Hans "Hanne" Berndt (30 October 1913 – 9 April 1988) was a German footballer who played for Tennis Borussia Berlin and VfB Königsberg. He was also capped three times for the Germany national team, scoring two goals.

== Career ==
=== Clubs ===
At the age of eleven, student Hans Berndt began playing football at SC Staaken. In February 1936, at the age of 25, he moved to Tennis Borussia Berlin. As a center forward, he was able to showcase his offensive skills in the Gauliga Berlin-Brandenburg and attract attention. In the first three seasons (1936–37 to 1938–39), the bold and aggressive striker scored 56 goals for the "Veilchen". After the shortened season of 1939–40 (outbreak of World War II; hence only ten games), the goal scorer celebrated the championship with Tennis Borussia in the 1940–41 season with 36 goals in the Gauliga Berlin-Brandenburg. On the last matchday, Hertha BSC was pushed to second place with an 8–2 victory. In the final round for the German Championship in 1941, Tennis Borussia played against NSTG Prague and Dresdner SC. The Saxons won both games against the team of Hanne Berndt. The title defense was not successful in 1942, and the striker experienced his second final round for the German Football Championship in 1944 wearing the VfB Königsberg jersey. With the Gauliga champion from East Prussia, he played against LSV Mölders Krakow and HSV Groß Born. He scored three goals in a 4–1 victory against the Luftwaffe sports club on 24 April 1944. He also scored a goal against Groß Born, but the army selection won 10–3. In Königsberg, he had Herbert Burdenski and Kurt Baluses as teammates.

In the fall of 1945, temporarily active at Schalke 04, Hanne Berndt, at the age of 33, led SG Charlottenburg (Tennis Borussia had been dissolved) to the championship in the 1946–47 season with 53 goals in 20 games in the Berlin city league. In the 1948–49 season, the club regained its name from SG Charlottenburg to Tennis Borussia Berlin. Sportingly, they achieved the runner-up position in the city league with 19 Berndt goals and won the Berlin Cup on 3 July 1949, with a 2–0 victory against Alemannia 1890 Berlin with two Hanne goals. In 1950, the indefatigable goal scorer scored 17 goals in 18 appearances and celebrated the championship in Berlin. The final round was already over after a 1–3 defeat against Kickers Offenbach. In the first year of professional players in Berlin, 1950–51, Berlin football split. Part of the team of the Berlin runner-up of 1949–50, Union Oberschöneweide, switched from East to West Berlin in June 1950 and continued to play there under the name SC Union 06 Berlin, finishing second again behind Tennis Borussia Berlin. Framed by half-strikers Gerhard Graf and Horst Schmutzler, the 37-year-old Berndt scored 27 goals in 23 games. In the final round for the German Championship in 1951, Hanne Berndt played with Tennis Borussia against Hamburger SV, 1. FC Nürnberg, and Preußen Münster. In Berlin, the football idol was elected Athlete of the Year in 1951. Due to problems with the cruciate ligament and meniscus, Hans Berndt only made ten appearances in the 1951–52 season in the Berlin Contract League. He scored nine goals. His club, Tennis Borussia Berlin, won the third championship in a row and once again reached the final round. Hanne Berndt, however, ended his career at the age of 38 before that. He scored over 1000 goals in his career overall.
