= Ragnar Lindbäck =

Finnish footballer (1906–1974)

Rudolf Ragnar Lindbäck (13 November 1906, Helsinki – 29 May 1974, Helsinki) was a Finnish footballer who played for HIFK Fotboll from 1926 until the end of 1939. He played as a defender, and was part of the HIFK squad that won the Mestaruussarja (Finnish Championship league) in 1930, 1931, 1933 and 1937. He ended his career after the 1939 season.

Lindbäck also played eleven matches with the Finland National team, and he was the captain of the Finnish football team at the 1936 Berlin Olympics, although he did not have any playing time during the Finnish team's only match, against Peru.
