= Aleksandr Olerski =

Estonian footballer

Personal information
- Full name: Aleksandr Olerski
- Date of birth: 18 May 1973
- Place of birth: Estonia
- Date of death: 21 October 2011 (aged 38)
- Position: Forward

Youth career
- 1982–1993: FC Puuma Tallinn

Senior career*
| Years | Team | Apps | (Gls) |
| 2002–2004 | FC Puuma Tallinn | | |

International career
| 1993 | Estonia | 2 | (0) |
- * Club domestic league appearances and goals

Aleksandr Olerski (18 May 1973 – 21 October 2011) was a football forward from Estonia. His last club was FC Puuma Tallinn.

Olerski died on 21 October 2011, at the age of 38, because of heart failure.

== International career ==
He obtained a total number of two caps for the Estonia national football team during his career. He earned his first official cap on 21 February 1993, when Estonia met Latvia in an indoor friendly.
