= Viktor Piisang =

Estonian footballer (1918–1944)

Viktor Piisang (10 July 1918 – 24 September 1944) was an Estonian footballer.

He was born in Rapla. He studied for three years at Tallinn Technical School (Estonian: Tallinna Tehnikum).

He played for the club Estonia, which in 1938 and 1939 won Estonian championships.

1938–1940 he was a member of Estonia national team.

In 1941, he was mobilized into the Red Army. He was injured at Battle of Velikiye Luki and was killed in Kohila, while being transported to Saaremaa.
