= Erich Papp =

Estonian footballer

Personal information
- Full name: Erich Eduard Papp
- Position: Midfielder

Senior career*
Years	Team	Apps	(Gls)
- Tallinna JK

International career
1940	Estonia	1	(0)
- * Club domestic league appearances and goals

Erich Eduard Papp was an Estonian footballer who played as a midfielder and made one appearance for the Estonia national team.

== Career ==
Papp earned his first and only cap for Estonia on 18 July 1940 in a friendly match against Latvia, which finished as a 2–1 win in Tallinn.

== Career statistics ==
=== International ===
Estonia
Year	Apps	Goals
1940	1	0
Total	1	0
