= Eino Kilpi (footballer) =

Finnish footballer (1910–1977)

Personal information
- Date of birth: 23 October 1910
- Place of birth: Helsinki, Finland
- Date of death: 27 November 1977 (aged 67)
- Place of death: Helsinki, Finland
- Position: Midfielder

International career
Years	Team	Apps	(Gls)
1937–1938	Finland	2	(0)

Eino Kilpi (23 October 1910 – 27 November 1977) was a Finnish footballer. He played in two matches for the Finland national football team from 1937 to 1938. He was also part of Finland's squad for the football tournament at the 1936 Summer Olympics, but he did not play in any matches.
