= Bernard Rein =

Estonian footballer and coach

Personal information
- Full name: Bernard Rein
- Date of birth: 19 November 1897
- Place of birth: Tallinn, Governorate of Estonia, Russian Empire
- Date of death: 9 November 1976 (aged 78)
- Place of death: Eskilstuna, Sweden
- Height: 1.83 m (6 ft 0 in)
- Position: Midfielder

Senior career*
Years	Team	Apps	(Gls)
1921–1927	Sport		
1928–1932	TJK		

International career
1922–1931	Estonia	27	(0)

Managerial career
- 1936–1938: Estonia
- * Club domestic league appearances and goals

Bernard Rein (born Bernhard Rein; 19 November 1897 – 9 November 1976) was an Estonian football player and coach.

Rein began playing football in 1914 with Olümpia. He fought in the Estonian War of Independence and graduated from Tallinn Tehnikum. From 1921 to 1932, he played for Sport and TJK, winning the Estonian Football Championship six times.

He made his international debut for Estonia in 1922 and played in the men's tournament at the 1924 Summer Olympics. Rein made a total of 27 appearances for the national team, including 19 as captain.

After retiring as a player, Rein became a coach and coached Estonia from 1936 to 1938.

During World War II, Rein fled to Sweden in 1944 where he died in 1976 at the age of 78.
