= Frans Karjagin =

Finnish footballer and bandy player

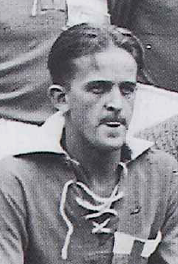
Frans Karjagin

Frans Karjagin (12 June 1909 – 16 July 1977) was a Finnish footballer and bandy player.

== Football career ==
He earned 57 caps at international level between 1929 and 1943. He also represented Finland at the 1936 Summer Olympics.

At club level Karjagin played for HPS, Töölön Vesa and HIFK.

== Bandy career ==
He capped 12 times at international level.

== Honours ==
=== Football ===
- Finnish Championship: 1930, 1931, 1933, 1937

=== Bandy ===
- Bandyliiga: 1934, 1935, 1938, 1939, 1941, 1944
