= Otto Siffling =

German footballer (1912–1939)

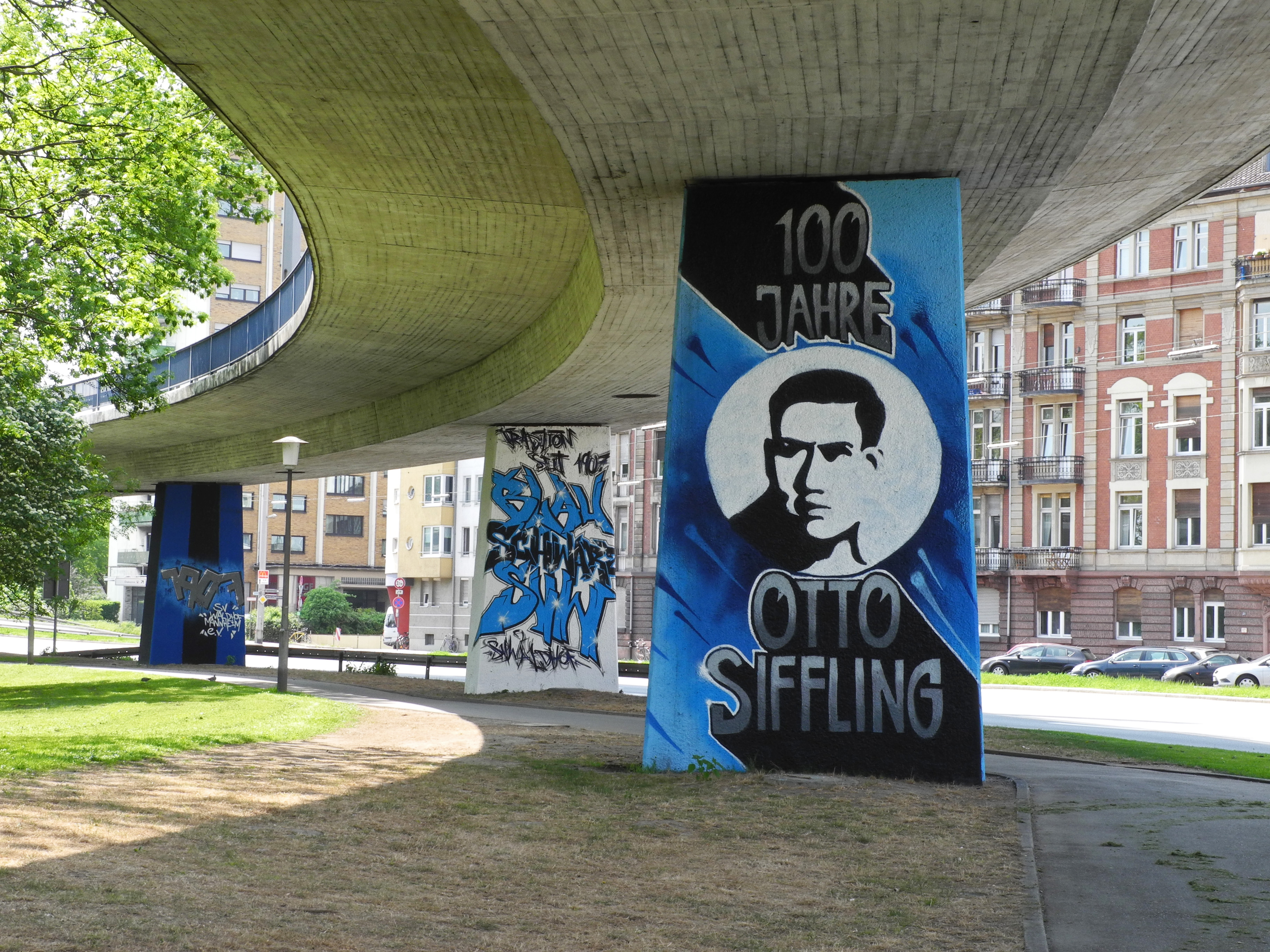
- Graffiti in Mannheim dedicated to Siffling

Personal information
- Date of birth: 3 August 1912
- Place of birth: Mannheim, German Empire
- Date of death: 20 October 1939 (aged 27)
- Place of death: Mannheim, Germany
- Position: Forward

Senior career*
Years	Team	Apps	(Gls)
1930–1939	Waldhof Mannheim		

International career
1934–1938	Germany	31	(17)
Medal record
Men's football
Representing Germany
FIFA World Cup
Third place	1934 Italy
- * Club domestic league appearances and goals

Otto Siffling (3 August 1912 – 20 October 1939) was a German footballer who played as a forward for Waldhof Mannheim and the Germany national team. As Germany international, he made 31 appearances scoring 17 goals between 1934 and 1938 and was a participant in the 1934 FIFA World Cup, where he scored a goal. He was part of the Breslau Eleven that beat Denmark 8–0 in Breslau in 1937 and went on to win 10 out 11 games played during that year. He was also part of Germany's squad at the 1936 Summer Olympics.

Siffling was one of the most talented center forwards of the 1930s. An opinionated and exceptionally gifted player, Siffling was a virtuoso on the pitch who impressed with his ingenuity and imagination when on the ball. Being not keen on overly physical play, he was not a traditional center forward, preferring to create more than to score. Taciturn in nature, he did not like to be in the spotlight and ovations at times made him feel uncomfortable. His performance for the Breslau Eleven in 1937 was the pinnacle of his career. In 1938, his level suddenly dropped inexplicably, so that he was not starting in the 1938 World Cup. A year later he died of a pleurisy, aged 27.

In his 1978 book Fussball, Helmut Schön characterised Siffling as follows:

"As a center forward he was not a tank but a playing center forward who still was enormously dangerous in front of the goal; in the famous game in Breslau he scored five goals. He was creating goals and scoring goals."

== International goals ==
No.	Date	Venue	Opponent	Score	Result	Competition
1.	27 May 1934	Florence, Italy	Belgium	2–2	5–2	1934 FIFA World Cup
2.	16 May 1937	Breslau, Germany	Denmark	2–0	8–0	Breslau Eleven
3.	16 May 1937	Breslau, Germany	Denmark	3–0	8–0	Breslau Eleven
4.	16 May 1937	Breslau, Germany	Denmark	4–0	8–0	Breslau Eleven
5.	16 May 1937	Breslau, Germany	Denmark	5–0	8–0	Breslau Eleven
6.	16 May 1937	Breslau, Germany	Denmark	6–0	8–0	Breslau Eleven
7.	21 November 1937	Hamburg, Germany	Sweden	1–0	5–0	1938 FIFA World Cup qualification
8.	21 November 1937	Hamburg, Germany	Sweden	4–0	5–0	1938 FIFA World Cup qualification
