= TUL Cup =

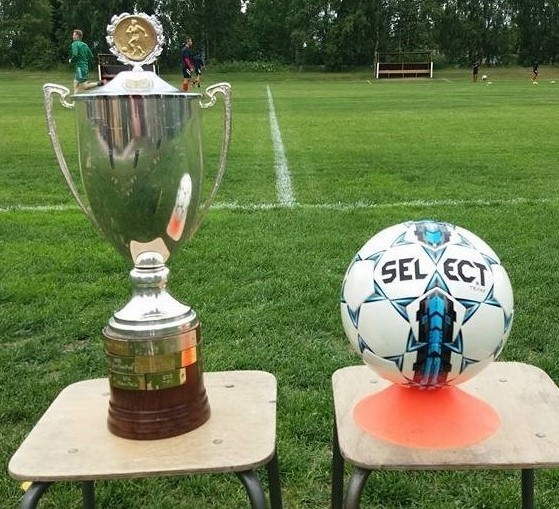
TUL Cup trophy

TUL Cup is the present name of the football championship of Finnish Workers' Sports Federation (TUL). It has been played in different formations since 1920. In the last two decades TUL Cup has been played as a pre-season competition. Final tournament is held in different city each year. The 2013 and 2015 TUL Cup finals were cancelled due to lack of participants and the 2020 finals due to the COVID-19 pandemic.

Between 1920 and 1947 the Workers' Sports Federation's clubs did not play in the same series as the teams of Finnish Football Association. In 1945—1947 the winners of TUL's series and Football Association's Mestaruussarja were playing for the Finnish championship title.

== Winners ==
- 1920 Kullervo
- 1921 Kullervo
- 1922 Kullervo
- 1923 Kullervo
- 1924 Kullervo
- 1925 Kullervo
- 1926 Töölön Vesa
- 1927 Jyry
- 1928 Kullervo
- 1929 Weikot
- 1930 Töölön Vesa
- 1931 Talikkalan Toverit
- 1932 TPV
- 1933 Talikkalan Toverit
- 1934 TPV
- 1935 Töölön Vesa
- 1936 Töölön Vesa
- 1937 KTP
- 1938 TPV
- 1939 KTP
- 1940 TPV
- 1941 not played
- 1942 not played
- 1943 TPV
- 1944 not played
- 1945 Kullervo
- 1946 TPV
- 1947 KTP
- 1948 RTU
- 1949 KTP
- 1950 KTP
- 1951 KTP
- 1952 KTP
- 1953 Turun Pyrkivä
- 1954 Turun Pyrkivä
- 1955 Karihaaran Tenho
- 1956–1972 not played
- 1973 Into
- 1974 Turun Pyrkivä
- 1975 Turun Pyrkivä
- 1976 Into
- 1977 MiPK
- 1978 Turun Pyrkivä
- 1979 JyPK
- 1980 OTP
- 1981 KTP
- 1982 PPT
- 1983 KTP
- 1984 Elo
- 1985 PPT
- 1986 OTP
- 1987 PPT
- 1988 Elo
- 1989 OTP
- 1990 PPT
- 1991 OTP
- 1992 VanPa
- 1993 FC Jazz
- 1994 TPV
- 1995 Ponnistus
- 1996 FC Jazz
- 1997 TPV
- 1998 FC Jazz
- 1999 KajHa
- 2000 PP-70
- 2001 PP-70
- 2002 FC Jazz
- 2003 PP-70
- 2004 FC KooTeePee
- 2005 FC KooTeePee
- 2006 FC Kiisto
- 2007 TPV
- 2008 KTP
- 2009 WJK
- 2010 FC KooTeePee
- 2011 JPS
- 2012 FC KooTeePee
- 2013 not played
- 2014 Sisu-Pallo
- 2015 not played
- 2016 TPV
- 2017 Toejoen Veikot
- 2018 MiPK
- 2019 MiPK
- 2020 cancelled

== See also ==
- Finnish Workers' Sports Federation football team
