= Reinhold Münzenberg =

German footballer

Personal information
- Date of birth: 25 January 1909
- Place of birth: Walheim, German Empire
- Date of death: 25 June 1986 (aged 77)
- Place of death: Aachen, West Germany
- Position: Defender

Senior career*
Years	Team	Apps	(Gls)
1921	Aachener Spielverein		
1927–1938	Alemannia Aachen	266	(81)
1943	SV Werder Bremen		
1943–1944	LSV Hamburg		
1946–1951	Alemannia Aachen	89	(21)
Total		355	(102)

International career
1930–1938	Germany	41	(0)

Managerial career
- 1934–1936: Alemannia Aachen
- 1949: Alemannia Aachen
- 1950: Alemannia Aachen
Medal record
Men's football
Representing Germany
FIFA World Cup
Third place	1934 Italy
- * Club domestic league appearances and goals

Reinhold Münzenberg (25 January 1909 in Walheim – 25 June 1986 in Aachen) was a German football player, in the defender position.

== Biography ==
Münzenberg spent most of his career with Alemannia Aachen (1927–1951) but also had spells with SV Werder Bremen and LSV Hamburg as a Wartime Guest Player. On the national level he played for Germany (41 matches, no goals), and was a participant at the 1934 and 1938 FIFA World Cups. Münzenberg was a member of the Breslau Eleven that beat Denmark 8–0 in Breslau in 1937 and went on to win 10 out 11 games played during that year. He was also part of Germany's squad at the 1936 Summer Olympics.

Münzenberg was considered to be one of the best and most athletic German defensive players of the 1930s. He started his career as a center half, a role in which the physically strong Münzenberg excelled, being one of the best headers of the ball of his time. After Germany had played at Wembley against England in 1935, the English press praised 'Steely' Münzenberg for his combination of toughness and technical ability, claiming that he played more 'English' than the English themselves. His reputation was one of athleticism and tremendous commitment. The first time Münzenberg made international football headlines, was after the 1934 World Cup third place game, when he marked the Czech goalgetter Josef Bican. By 1936, Münzenberg had been converted from center half to left back, another role in which excelled. The full back pairing of Paul Janes and Münzenberg became one of the best of the late-1930s in Europe. After he retired from football, Münzenberg became an architect. He died in 1986 only hours after having watched the World Cup semi final in which West Germany beat France 2–0.

In his 1978 book "Fußball", Helmut Schön characterised Münzenberg as follows:

"The counterpart to Paul Janes. He was edgier and harder, certainly not a finesse player; a man who as a defender would not beat around the bush."
