= Socialist Workers' Sport International =

International socialist sporting organisation (1920–1946)

1925 Poster for the Workers' Olympiad in Frankfurt

Socialist Workers' Sport International (German: Sozialistische Arbeitersport Internationale, SASI) was an international socialist sporting organisation, based in Lucerne. It was founded in 1920, and consisted of six national federations (with a combined membership of about one million) at the time of its foundation. Initially it was known as International Association for Sports and Physical Culture. Informally it was known as the Lucerne Sport International. It adopted the name SASI in 1926. The Austro-Marxist Julius Deutsch was the president of SASI.

International Labour Sports Federation (CSIT) was established in 1946 as the successor of SASI.

== Foundation ==
An international meeting of workers sports associations had been held in Ghent, Belgium, in 1913. However, the First World War put the build-up of an international workers' sport organisation on hold. After the war two Belgians, Gaston Bridoux and Jules Devlieger, took initiative to revive the cooperation. Preparatory meetings were held in Seraing, Belgium in 1919 and in Paris, France, during Easter 1920. The founding congress of the international took place in Lucerne from 13 to 14 September 1920. During the foundation, the French and Belgian delegations urged that the word 'Socialist' be omitted from the name of the organisation, in order to attract a broader following.

== Politics ==
The organisation upheld a policy of neutrality towards party organisations, a policy inherited from the German workers' sports movement (which tried to steer away from the fractional conflicts between the German socialists). This policy was however challenged by the communists, which claimed that the workers' sport movement could not abstain from taking part in revolutionary struggle. In 1921, the third congress of the Communist International decided to form a parallel sport international. In August 1921, the Sportintern was founded. Sportintern launched fierce political attacks against the Lucerne international. Its Czechoslovak section had suffered a split in July 1921, as the communists deserted it.

At the second congress of the Lucerne International, held in Leipzig 1922, the French delegation argued in favour of unification between the two Internationals. This policy was not supported by the congress. The following year, the French affiliate FST decided to shift its membership to Sportintern.

Ahead of the 1925 Workers Olympiad, the Sportintern appealed to the Lucerne International that four Sportintern delegations (France, Soviet Union, Norway, Czechoslovakia) should be allowed to participate. Discussions lingered on within the Lucerne International, but after communist sportsmen had made a public protest at a German Workers Sports Festival in Karlsbad in 1924, it was decided that the Sportintern would be barred from the Workers Olympiad. Likewise SASI barred its affiliates for participating in the 1928 Spartakiad organised by Sportintern.

Politically, SASI was supported by the International Federation of Trade Unions and the Labour and Socialist International.

== Workers' Olympiads ==
The main activity of SASI was the organizing of the International Workers' Olympiads, portrayed as a socialist alternative to the 'bourgeois' Olympics. At the Workers Olympiads only the red flag was used, rather than national flags.

- The first Workers' Olympiad was held in Frankfurt am Main, Germany, in 1925. There were around 150,000 spectators. A world record was broken in the 100 meter women's relay race. The summer Workers Olympiad had been preceded by winter games the same year, in Schreiberhau, in which twelve national delegations had participated.
- The second Workers' Olympiad was held in Vienna, Austria, in 1931. 80,000 athletes took part in the games, which had around 250,000 spectators. The games were larger than the 1932 Los Angeles Olympics, both in number of participants and spectators.
- A winter Workers' Olympiad was held in Mürzzuschlag, Austria, in 1931. Like the summer event, the winter Workers Olympiad was larger (in number of participants and spectators) than the 1932 Lake Placid Olympics.
- The third Workers' Olympiad was held in Antwerp, Belgium in 1937. For the first time, non-SASI organisations could send delegates. A delegation from the Soviet Union took part, and won the football final. Around 50,000 people watched the final day of the Workers Olympiad, and 200 000 took part in the closing rally. A winter Workers Olympics were held in Janské Lázně, Czechoslovakia.
- A fourth Workers' Olympiad was planned to be held in Helsinki, Finland in 1943, but never materialized.

== Affiliates ==
- British Workers' Sports Association
- Morgnshtern (a Jewish socialist sport federation in Poland, joined the SASI as its 'Jewish section', at its 1929 congress in Prague)
- Polish Workers' Sport Federation
- Hapoel (joined in 1927)
- Finnish Workers' Sports Federation
- Arbeiter-Turn- und Sportbund
- Federation Sportive du Travail (until 1923)
- Fédération sportive et gymnastique du Travail d'Alsace et de Lorraine
- Fédération sportive du Travail d'Alsace et de Lorraine

== Membership ==
As of 1931, SASI claimed the following membership figures:

Country	Membership
Germany	1,211,468
Austria	293,700
Czechoslovakia: Czechoslovak federation; German Sudetenland federation	136,977; 70,730
Finland	30,257
Switzerland	21,624
Denmark	20,000
Netherlands	16,795
Belgium	12,909
France	6,000
Alsace-Lorraine	5,000
Poland: Polish federation; Jewish federation; German federation; Ukrainian federation	7,000; 4,369; 938; 1,925
Norway	10,000
Lithuania	5,171
United Kingdom	5,000
Palestine	4,250
USA	697
Romania	2,500
Yugoslavia	1,800
Hungary	1,750
Estonia	1,600
Total:	1,872,460

== See also ==
- Red Sport International (Sportintern)
- SportAccord
