= CSIT =

International sports organization

CSIT - International Workers and Amateurs in Sports Confederation (French: Confédération Sportive Internationale Travailliste et Amateur)
- Founded at: 10 March 1913 in Ghent, Belgium
- Purpose: Sport for All
- Location: Vienna, Austria
- Secretary General: Wolfgang Burghardt
- President: Bruno Molea
- Website: www.csit.sport

The CSIT – International Workers and Amateurs in Sports Confederation (also known as International Labor and Amateur Sports Confederation) (French: CSIT - Confédération Sportive Internationale Travailliste et Amateur; CSIT) is an international multi-sports organization. It was established as the successor to the Socialist Workers' Sport International and, as such, celebrated its centenary in 2013. The core principles of contributing to physical activity and sports have stayed in its action policy; upholding the right of men and women to do sports no matter what their professionalism levels are. The key concept of CSIT's sports policy has always been "Sports for all." The policy stems from the historical ideas of the international worker sport movement.

International Workers and Amateurs in Sports Confederation has been recognized by the IOC since 1986 and a member of GAISF since 1973.

The main activities of CSIT consist of organizing major and small sports events for amateurs, specifically the CSIT World Sports Games and CSIT Single Championship. Sports events are considered festivals of friendship and cultural exchange, with events promoting awareness of tolerance, respect, unity, sustainability, and fair play in a sporting environment.

Within the world of international sport, it maintains its support for everyone to benefit from sporting activities regardless of their qualifications, talent, nationality, age, sex, and social background.

== Base History ==
1. International Socialist Association for Physical Education (ASIEP), 1913–1914.
2. L'Internationale sportive de Lucerne, 1920-1939 (rename to Socialist Workers' Sports International in 1928).
3. International Labour Sports Confederation 1946
4. Recognized in 1973 and 1986 by AGFIS and IOC.
5. 2011 rename to International Labor and Amateur Sports Confederation (CSITA) for amateurism purpose.

The first Workers' Sports International was created on 10 May 1913 in Ghent, Belgium, under the name of the International Socialist Association for Physical Education (ASIEP). It brought together workers' sports organisations from France, England and Belgium before also welcoming the Federation of Workers' Gymnasts of Germany, the largest organisation of its kind on a global scale. Like all international organisations of the workers' movement, its history was marked by the wars of the 20th century. ASIEP was re-established in Lucerne, Switzerland on 14 September 1920. Commonly called the Lucerne Sports International, in 1928 it adopted the official name of the Socialist Workers' Sports International1. The latter disappeared after the outbreak of the Second World War. Its successor was the International Labour Sports Committee, established in Brussels, Belgium on 30 May 1946, which would become the International Labour Sports Confederation2.

In 1973 this association joined SportAccord (ex-AGFIS) and was recognized by the International Olympic Committee (IOC) on October 31, 1986. From the following year the general assembly became annual and turned into a congress every two years. In 2011 the Rio de Janeiro congress3 decided to engage the CSIT in the defense and promotion of amateurism and its name became the International Labor and Amateur Sports Confederation (CSITA).

It celebrated its centenary in Brussels and Ghent in Belgium in 20134. On this occasion it was decided that the congress would henceforth be annual.

== Games History ==
Before the Second World War, the CSIT organized the Workers' Olympics every 6 years in 1925, 1931 and 1937. If the CSIT then organized major championships by discipline, it was not until 2008 that the CSIT World Sports Games were reestablished in Rimini and organized every two years since. The 2012 edition was postponed by one year so that these games could take place in odd years and thus avoid competing with the Olympic Games every 4 years6. In 1936, it was also the exceptional initiator of the Popular Olympics in Barcelona organized as a counterpoint to the Berlin Olympic Games.

1. 1925 Workers' Olympics
2. 1931 Workers' Olympics
3. 1936 Workers' Olympics

No games after world war II.

Socialist Workers' Sport International and International Workers' Olympiads and People's Olympiad and Spartakiad.

== International Co-operation (ICO) ==
The CSIT works in good co-operation with the:

1. IOC (International Olympic Committee),
2. GAISF & SportAccord (United Sports Federations),
3. ICSSPE (International Council of Sport and Physical Education),
4. EFPM (European Fair Play Movement),
5. ISCA (International Sport and Culture Association),
6. WADA (World Anti-Doping Agency),
7. TAFISA (The Association for International Sport for All),
8. FICEP (Fédération Internationale Catholique Education Physique et Sportive),
9. AISTS (International Academy of Sport Science and Technology),
10. IWG (International Working Group on Women and Sport),
11. FICS (The International Federation of Sports Chiropractic),
12. P.I. (Panathlon International) and
13. ENGSO (European Non-Governmental Sports Organisation).

== Activities ==
The main fields of the CSIT activities are as follows:

- International Amateur Sports Championships (CSIT World Sports Games) The CSIT World Sports Games are the primary activity of the International Amateur Sports Championships. These events are not designed for professional athletes, but for workers and amateur sports enthusiasts from various countries and cultures worldwide. The goal is not only to organize a sports competition but also to foster lifelong friendships, intercultural exchange, and unity in sports by bringing together sports enthusiasts as a global family.
- CSIT Single Championships In addition to the World Sports Games, CSIT organizes individual sports championships across the globe in disciplines such as beach volleyball, swimming, chess, tennis, and more. Sports for All Activities
- Sports for Elderly People (Seniors 55+) CSIT also aims to organize events for elderly participants, providing them with opportunities to engage in specific sports and physical activities. These events promote the exchange of training programs and knowledge, as well as cultural, tourism, and lifestyle exchanges between countries.
- Sports for Disabled People Starting with the 2021 World Sports Games in Cervia, CSIT intends to include sports for disabled athletes, initially for demonstration and promotion. The strategy involves integrating athletes with and without disabilities into teams, thereby promoting inclusion, unity, and tolerance in sports. This pilot project will feature sports such as futsal, basketball, and volleyball.
- YOUAca – Preparatory works for Youth Academy of Grassroots Sport. Currently, in sport organization at grassroots level, there are more adults and seniors than young people, who usually don't have the real opportunity to improve their skills in order to build their path into the sport's sector. From the other side, since there is a lack of young people sport organizations at the club level, at national level, but also at the European level, the policymakers are getting older and decision making becomes more bureaucratic. In order to improve the situation, the partnership of 4 National sports organizations coordinated by CSIT intends to put into place preparatory works for starting up the Academy of Grassroots Sport for Young Leaders. Currently, the YOUAca project is running on its second edition (YOUAca 2.0.) with 5 nations participating: Italy (AICS), Spain (UCEC), Croatia (Health Life Academy), Finland (TUL), Estonia (Kalev). In its third edition YOUAca is planned to be renamed to YOU.Lead.
- Bridges - building integration and solidarity between "old" and "new" citizens (local inhabitants and immigrants from different countries). The main aim is to create inclusive local communities and enhance solidarity. This communication should create and foster a positive perception of migration (instead of existing "immigrants invasion" theory) and intercultural dialogue. The duration of the project is from January 2019 until June 2021 with Austria, Greece, Croatia, Italy and Spain participating.

== Relevant activities and experiences ==
The achievement of the following aims is the most important task of the CSIT:

- to bring together workers and amateur sports organizations of the entire world and to promote the foundation of new organizations,
- to co-operate with international organizations with the same goals and values,
- to support member organizations with their tasks and activities in all the fields of sport and physical culture, also through agreements with international organizations and authorities,
- to promote all activities that aim to improve the practice of sports by human beings of two sexes considering their age and their physical aptitudes in order to protect and improve their health;
- to achieve the aims by respecting the amateur status of athletes, the values of amateurism and the educational values of sport,
- to encourage to practice sport and physical activity in nature while considering the protection of the environment,
- to use sport as a means to promote peace and mutual understanding among people and to contribute to development of the world of social associations at any level,
- to sustain cultural advancement and to improve health including psychophysical conditions of the member unions as well as its individual members.

== Pillars ==
The objectives of the CSIT are conducted in praxis by clearly defined pillars. They are the CSIT World Sports Games, the CSIT Single Championships, the International Tournaments, the International Festivals, the Sport for All-activities, the International Projects and the Health, Recreation and Fitness Activities, as well as EU-funded projects: YOUAca (Youth Academy of Grassroots Sport) and Bridges (intercultural exchange between old and new members of local communities).

== Recognized Sports ==
Main: 15 Sports in 2025

Lists:

1. Sports Athletics
2. Basketball & 3x3 Basketball
3. Beach Volleyball/Indoor Volleyball
4. Sports Mamanet (Catch'n Serve Ball)
5. Chess
6. Dance
7. Football, Mini & Beach Soccer
8. Gymnastics
9. Judo
10. Karate & Hand-To-Hand Combat
11. Pétanque
12. Swimming
13. Table Tennis
14. Tennis, Beach Tennis & Padel
15. Wrestling & Beach Wrestling
- Also Parasport

Others:

== Events ==
1. CSIT World Sports Games (WSG)
2. CSIT Single Championship
3. World Amateur Sports Forum
4. EU co-funded Projects

== Congress ==
The 45th CSIT Congress in Barcelona in Spain in 2023 with 63 nations.

== Members ==
The CSIT has the following members and candidates as of June 2021 :

84 Member from 55 countries in 1 March 2025.

1. Africa (6): ALG, ANG, MLI, MAR, RSA, TUN
2. Asia (8): CHN, HKG, IND, IRI, IRQ, JPN, KOR, TPE
3. Oceania (1): AUS
4. Americas (7): BRA, CAN, CHI, HAI, MEX, PER, USA
5. Europe (31): ALB, AUT, BEL, BUL, CRO, CYP, DEN, EST, FIN, FRA, GER, GRE, IRL, ISR, ITA, KOS, LAT, LTU, LUX, MLT, MDV

NED, POL, POR, ROM, SRB, SVK, SLO, SPA, SUI, UKR

FORMER MEMBER: UZB, SWE, RUS, BLR AND ... .

Country	Member	Membership
Algeria	Federation Algerienne Sport et Travail	Full or associate
Americas	Confederação Pan-Americana de Desporto do Trabalhador	(Sub)-continental
Austria	Arbeitsgemeinschaft für Sport und Körperkultur in Österreich	Full or associate
Austria	MAMANET Austria	Full or associate
Belgium	Association Francophone du Sport Travailliste Belge	Full or associate
Belgium	FROS Multisport Vlaanderen vzw	Full or associate
Belgium	Vlaamse Vechtsport Associatie	Full or associate
Bulgaria	Bulgarian Workers' Federation "Sport and Health"	Full or associate
Cameroon	Association Sportive Travailliste du Cameroun	Full or associate
China	China Workers' Center for International Exchanges	Full or associate
Croatia	Health Life Academy	Full or associate
Cyprus	Pancyprian Worker's Sport Club of Cyprus	Full or associate
Denmark	Dansk Arbejder Idraetsforbund	Full or associate
Estonia	Estonian Sports Association 'Jõud'	Full or associate
Estonia	Estonian Sports Association Kalev	Full or associate
Finland	Suomen Työväen Urheiluliitto	Full or associate
France	Fédération française du sport travailliste	Full or associate
France	Fédération sportive et gymnique du travail	Full or associate
Germany	Rad- und Kraftfahrerbund "Solidarität" Deutschland 1896 e.V.	Full or associate
Greece	Hellenic Organization for Company Sport & Health	Full or associate
India	Indian Dr. BR Ambedkar Sports Foundation	Full or associate
Iran	Federation of Amateur & Workers Sports of Iran	Full or associate
Iraq	Iraqi Companies Sport Federation	Full or associate
Ireland	Athletics Ireland	Full or associate
Israel	Hapoel Sport Association	Full or associate
Italy	Associazione di Cultura Sport e Tempo Libero	Full or associate
Italy	Associazione Italiana Cultura Sport	Full or associate
Italy	Centro Nazionale Sportivo Libertas	Full or associate
Italy	Federazione Italiana Sport Acrobatici e Coreografici	Full or associate
Italy	Centro Sportivo Educativo Nationale	Full or associate
Italy	Mamanet Italy	Full or associate
Italy	Italian Footbike Federation (FIFB)	Full or associate
Kosovo	Kosova Workers Sports Federation	Full or associate
Latvia	Latvian Sport for All Association	Full or associate
Lithuania	Lithuanian Sports Society "ZALGIRIS"	Full or associate
Malta	Malta Sports For All	Full or associate
Mexico	Instituto del Deporte de los Trabajadores	Full or associate
Netherlands	Nederlandse Culturele Sportbond	Full or associate
Peru	Asociacion Deportiva Peruana de los Trabajadores (ADEPET)	Full or associate
Portugal	Fundação INATEL	Full or associate
Portugal	Federação Portuguesa de Lohan Tao Kempo	Full or associate
Russia	Russian Sport Association "Atom-sport"	Full or associate
Slovenia	Union of Amateur and Workers Sports of Slovenia	Full or associate
South Korea	Korea Office Worker Sports Committee	Full or associate
Spain	Unió de Consells Esportius de Catalunya	Full or associate
Switzerland	Schweizerischer Arbeiter-Turn- und Sportverband	Full or associate
Switzerland	FederSwiss - Sport for all	Full or associate
Tunisia	Organisation Nationale Culture Sport et Travail	Full or associate
Tunisia	Fédération Tunisienne Sport et Travail	Full or associate
Turkey	Turkish Sports for All Federation	Full or associate
United Kingdom	Judo for All United Kingdom	Full or Associate
Ukraine	Ukrainian Hand-To-Hand Combat Federation(UHHCF)	Full or associate

== Partners and networks ==
- International Olympic Committee
- SportAccord
- International Council of Sport and Physical Education
- European Fair Play Movement
- International Sport and Culture Association
- World Anti-Doping Agency
- The Association for International Sport for All
- Fédération Internationale Catholique Education Physique et Sportive
- International Academy of Sport Science and Technology
- International Working Group on Women and Sport
- The International Federation of Sports Chiropractic
- Panathlon International
- European Non-Governmental Sports Organisation
- The International FXC - Fireball Extreme Challenge Federation

== CSIT World Sports Games - A New Brand of the CSIT ==
The CSIT World Sports Games are an international multi-sport event organized every two years for workers and amateur athletes. The event was first held in 2008, in Rimini, Italy. as of November 2020, six editions had been held in: Italy, Estonia, Bulgaria, Latvia and Spain. The 7th edition, scheduled to take place in Cervia, Italy. In 2021 was cancelled because of the COVID-19 pandemic. The CSIT World Sports Games are the successor to the International Workers' Olympiads.

Edition	Year	City	Country
1	2008	Rimini	Italy
2	2010	Tallinn	Estonia
3	2013	Varna	Bulgaria
4	2015	Lignano	Italy
5	2017	Rīga	Latvia
6	2019	Tortosa	Spain
7	2023	Cervia	Italy

- 2021 was cancelled Croatia.
- 2025 in Greece.

=== 2017 ===
* Host nation (Latvia)

2017 Medal Table
Rank	Nation	Gold	Silver	Bronze	Total
1	Austria	158	127	86	371
2	Netherlands	76	72	62	210
3	Russia	44	9	4	57
4	Israel	36	44	38	118
5	Brazil	27	42	31	100
6	Iran	26	9	10	45
7	Finland	24	25	38	87
8	France	21	39	36	96
9	Mexico	19	11	13	43
10	Belgium	19	10	12	41
11	Italy	17	12	9	38
12	Latvia*	13	26	27	66
13	Ireland	10	3	5	18
14	Bulgaria	2	3	0	5
15	Switzerland	2	2	3	7
16	Slovenia	2	0	0	2
16	Tunisia	2	0	0	2
18	Estonia	1	4	3	8
19	Portugal	1	0	4	5
20	Spain	0	3	2	5
21	Great Britain	0	2	2	4
22	Denmark	0	1	2	3
23	Cyprus	0	1	1	2
24	Algeria	0	1	0	1
24	Benin	0	1	0	1
Totals (25 entries)		500	447	388	1,335

=== Sports (2017) ===
15 official CSIT championships and 8 demonstration sports:

==== Individual Sports ====
- Athletics
- Swimming
- Wrestling
- Beach Wrestling
- Judo
- Table Tennis
- Tennis
- Beach Tennis
- Chess
- Pétanque

==== Team Sports ====
- Football
- Mini Football
- Basketball
- Beach volleyball
- Volleyball
- Mamanet

=== Demonstration Sports ===
1. O-Sport
2. Bowling
3. Wheel Gymnastics
4. YOU.FO
5. Street Workout
6. Crossminton
7. Darts
8. Streetball (3 on 3)
- others : Spikeball, Kubb, Body Art, Zumba, Capoeira, Arm wrestling, Table hockey, Kendo, Lacrosse, Croquet, Archery, Novuss, Orienteering, Karate (All Style), Sambo.

=== 2019 ===
==== Individual Sports ====
- Athletics
- Swimming
- Wrestling
- Beach Wrestling
- Judo
- Karate
- Table Tennis
- Tennis
- Beach Tennis
- Chess
- Pétanque

==== Team Sports ====
- Football
- Mini Football
- Basketball
- Beach volleyball
- Volleyball
- Mamanet

==== CSIT Partner Championships ====
Pole Dance, Mini Golf, Wheel Gym, American Football, Skating, Dancing, Fistball, Handball.

==== Medals ====
Results:

* Host nation (Spain)

2019 Medal Table
Rank	Nation	Gold	Silver	Bronze	Total
1	Austria	175	128	118	421
2	Netherlands	93	91	65	249
3	Iran	62	45	28	135
4	Russia	62	27	10	99
5	Israel	30	30	31	91
6	Mexico	28	28	39	95
7	Italy	25	37	28	90
8	Belgium	12	24	24	60
9	Spain*	12	15	14	41
10	Portugal	8	4	6	18
11	France	7	14	21	42
12	Ireland	6	2	3	11
13	Bulgaria	6	1	0	7
14	Finland	5	6	7	18
15	Switzerland	3	7	5	15
16	Estonia	2	9	5	16
17	Tunisia	2	0	2	4
18	Brazil	1	4	10	15
19	Belarus	1	0	0	1
20	Cuba	0	2	1	3
20	Latvia	0	2	1	3
22	Denmark	0	1	0	1
23	Great Britain	0	0	2	2
24	Algeria	0	0	1	1
24	Slovenia	0	0	1	1
24	United States	0	0	1	1
Totals (26 entries)		540	477	423	1,440

=== 2023 ===
==== Individual Sports ====
- Athletics
- Swimming
- Wrestling
- Beach Wrestling
- Judo
- Karate
- Beach Tennis
- Tennis
- Table Tennis
- Chess
- Pétanque
- Gymnastics
- Parkour

==== Team Sports ====
- Football
- Mini Football
- Beach Soccer
- Basketball
- 3x3 Basketball
- Beach Volleyball
- Volleyball
- Mamanet

==== Demonstration Sports ====
- Hand-to-hand Combat
- Judo Kata
- Futsal
- Beach Mamanet
- Green Volleyball
- Bagherone Volleyball

Source :

==== Medal table ====
Results :

* Host nation (Italy)

2023 Medal Table
Rank	Nation	Gold	Silver	Bronze	Total
1	Austria	162	150	78	390
2	Mexico	120	92	91	303
3	Italy*	92	81	69	242
4	Netherlands	80	76	60	216
5	Belgium	53	37	27	117
6	France	33	25	43	101
7	Israel	26	25	24	75
8	Ukraine	20	11	10	41
9	Finland	19	18	25	62
10	Bulgaria	8	1	1	10
11	Portugal	7	1	1	9
12	Ireland	4	9	1	14
13	Estonia	3	1	1	5
14	Moldova	2	3	3	8
15	Uzbekistan	1	7	6	14
16	Canada	1	2	0	3
17	Poland	1	1	0	2
18	Denmark	1	0	1	2
18	Kosovo	1	0	1	2
18	Slovenia	1	0	1	2
21	Morocco	1	0	0	1
22	Brazil	0	2	3	5
23	Iran	0	2	2	4
24	Great Britain	0	1	2	3
25	Lithuania	0	1	0	1
26	Latvia	0	0	2	2
27	Luxembourg	0	0	1	1
27	Sweden	0	0	1	1
Totals (28 entries)		636	546	454	1,636

=== 2025 ===
- Official website
- List of 28 sport disciplines at CSIT World Sports Games 2025
- Venue information
- Event schedule
- Official results
- Medal standings

== See also ==
- Football at the International Workers' Olympiads
- World Firefighters Games
- World Military Games
- World Police and Fire Games
- Stånga Games
- Spartakiad
- Red Sport International
