= 1921 Workers' Olympiad =

- Host city: Prague, Czechoslovakia
- Nations: 13
- Dates: 25 June 1921 – 29 June 1921

1921 Workers' Olympiad was the first unofficial edition of the International Workers' Olympiads, organized by the 1920-established Lucerne Sport International and hosted by the Czechoslovak Workers' Gymnastic Association in Prague, Czechoslovakia. The original scheduled date was August, but finally the games were held from 25 to 29 June 1921. The first official Workers' Olympiads were held in 1925 in Schreiberhau (Winter) and Frankfurt (Summer) in Germany. The unofficial Czechoslovak games were staged again in 1927 and 1934.

== Participants ==
In contrast to the 1920 Summer Olympics in Antwerp, where the losing side of the World War I had been banned, athletes from the "enemy" nations were also invited. The number of participating countries was thirteen; Austria, Belgium, Bulgaria, Czechoslovakia, Great Britain, Finland, France, Germany, Poland, Switzerland, United States, Soviet Russia and Yugoslavia.

== The games ==
In addition to competitive sports, the games featured mass artistic displays, choral recitals, political plays and singing of revolutionary songs. According to the reports of the Finnish Workers' Sports Federation, the competitions were poorly organized, but the mass gymnastic displays were spectacular.

The most successive country was Finland, whose athletes won every sport they competed in. This was a great surprise for all, even for the Finns themselves. Their intention was to meet the "top athletes of the world", but instead, the Finns found themselves on the top. Main reason for their success was the totally different culture; while the Finns focused in competing, the other European organizations were more interested of the educational aspects in labor sports.

The official poster was designed by the Czech artist Václav Čutta.

== International Spartakiad ==
Later in July 1921, the Comintern-supported Red Sport International staged its first international Spartakiad in Prague.
