= Football at the International Workers' Olympiads =

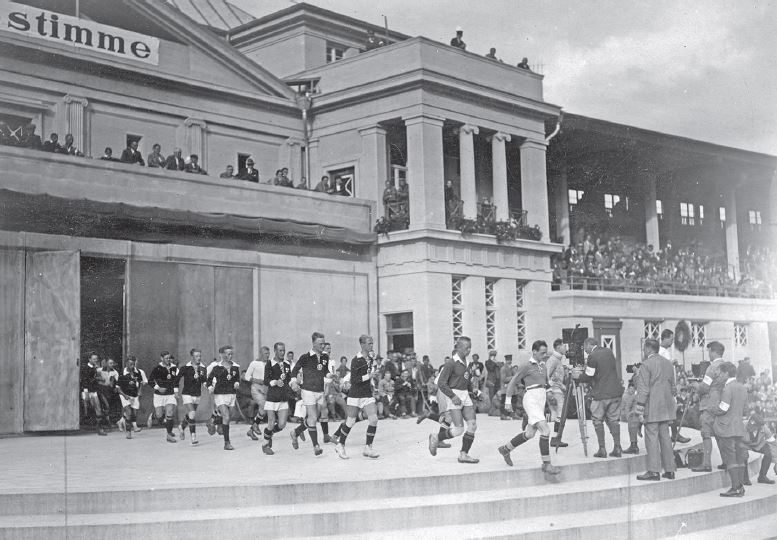
The teams of Germany and Finland entering the field before the final of the 1925 Workers' Summer Olympiad in Frankfurt.

Association football was included in every three editions of International Workers' Summer Olympiads in 1925, 1931 and 1937 as a men's competition sport. Tournaments were played as a single-elimination tournament. Countries were represented by selected teams of their workers' sports associations and the players were mostly amateurs. Exception was the Soviet team in 1937 as it was based mostly on the team of masters of Spartak sports society out of Moscow and participating in the recently established in the Soviet Union competitions of football teams of sports societies, Class A, a predecessor of the Soviet Top League.

== Frankfurt am Main 1925 ==
1925 Workers' Summer Olympiad was held in Frankfurt am Main, Germany. Participating teams in the football tournament were Belgium, Czechoslovakia, Finland, France, Germany and Switzerland.

=== Group stage ===
July 24–26, 1925

| Switzerland | beat | France |

Waldstadion football grounds, Frankfurt am Main
July 24–26, 1925

| Belgium | beat | Switzerland |

Waldstadion football grounds, Frankfurt am Main
July 24–26, 1925

| Germany | 6–0 | Switzerland |

Waldstadion football grounds, Frankfurt am Main
July 24–26, 1925

| Finland | 4–2 | Belgium |

Waldstadion football grounds, Frankfurt am Main
July 24–26, 1925

| Germany | 3–1 | Belgium |

Waldstadion football grounds, Frankfurt am Main

=== Semifinals ===
July 27, 1925

| Germany | 6–1 | Czechoslovakia |

Waldstadion football grounds, Frankfurt am Main

=== Final ===
July 28, 1925

| Germany | 2–0 | Finland |

Waldstadion, Frankfurt am Main
Attendance: 40,000

== Vienna 1931 ==
1931 Workers' Summer Olympiad was held in Vienna, Austria and 16 teams took part at the football tournament. Leading scorer was Erwin Seeler, the father of famous German striker Uwe Seeler. He scored seven goals on a quarterfinal match against Hungary as the German team beat the Hungarians 9–0.

=== First round ===
July 22, 1931

| Czechoslovakia | 4–4 (Czechoslovakia qualified after drawing lots) | Norway |

Vienna
July 22, 1931

| Switzerland | 3–0 | Latvia |

Vienna
July 22, 1931

| Austria | 5–1 | Finland |

Vienna
July 23, 1931

| Hungary | 3–1 | Mandatory Palestine |

Vienna
July 23, 1931

| Poland | 1–0 | Estonia |

Vienna
July 23, 1931

| Germany | 8–1 | Denmark |

Vienna

=== Quarterfinals ===
July 24, 1931

| Belgium | 5–0 | France |

Vienna
July 24, 1931

| Austria | 8–1 | Switzerland |

Vienna
July 24, 1931

| Germany | 9–0 | Hungary |

Vienna
July 24, 1931

| Poland | 3–2 | Czechoslovakia |

Vienna

=== Semifinals ===
July 24, 1931

| Austria | 3–1 | Belgium |

Vienna
July 24, 1931

| Germany | 4–1 | Poland |

Vienna

=== Final ===
July 26, 1931

| Austria | 3–2 | Germany |

Praterstadion, Vienna
Attendance: 65,000

=== Consolation tournament ===
July 23, 1931

| Norway | 5–0 | Estonia |

Vienna
July 24, 1931

| Norway | 6–3 | Finland |

Vienna
July 25, 1931

| Norway | 4–0 | Mandatory Palestine |

Vienna

== Antwerp 1937 ==
1937 Workers' Summer Olympiad was held in Antwerp, Belgium. It was a joint event with the Spartakiads. Participating teams came from Belgium, Czechoslovakia, Denmark, England, Finland, France, Hungary, Netherlands, Norway, Palestine, Poland, Soviet Union, Spanish Republican faction and Switzerland. A delegation from Soviet Union was competing at the Olympiads for the first time. German athletes did not participate since labor sports organisations were disbanded in Germany by the Nazi regime in 1933. The Soviet Union was represented by Spartak Moscow.

Note: the results are not complete.

=== First round ===
July 1937

| Spartak Moscow (Soviet Union) | 8–0 | Denmark |

Antwerp
July 1937

| Norway | 7–1 | Mandatory Palestine |

Antwerp
July 1937

| Switzerland | 3–2 | Finland |

Antwerp

=== Quarterfinals ===
July 1937

| Spanish Republicans (Second Spanish Republic) | 2–0 | Belgium |

Antwerp
July 1937

| Spartak Moscow (Soviet Union) | 7–1 | France |

Antwerp
July 1937

| Norway | 4–0 | Switzerland |

Antwerp

=== Semifinals ===
July 31, 1937

| Spartak Moscow (Soviet Union) | 2–1 | (Second Spanish Republic) Spanish Republicans |

Antwerp
July 31, 1937

| Norway | 3–1 | Czechoslovakia |

Antwerp

=== Final ===
August 1, 1937

| Spartak Moscow (Soviet Union) | 2–0 | Norway |

Olympic Stadium, Antwerp
Attendance: 25,000

=== Consolation tournament ===
July 1937

| Finland | 5–0 w.o. (1–1) | Mandatory Palestine |

Antwerp
July 1937

| England | 2–1 | Finland |

Antwerp

== Sources ==
- RSSSF - Labour Olympiads
