= 1937 Workers' Summer Olympiad =

International multi-sport event

- Host city: Antwerp, Belgium
- Nations: 15
- Dates: 25 July 1937 – 1 August 1937
- Main venue: Olympisch Stadion

The 1937 Workers' Summer Olympiad was the sixth edition of International Workers' Olympiads. The games were held from 25 July to 1 August at Antwerp in Belgium. They were originally planned for Barcelona 1936, but cancelled due to the outbreak of the Spanish Civil War.

1937 Olympiad was a joint event with the Red Sport International organized Spartakiads. It was the first time as a delegation from Soviet Union took part at the Workers' Olympiad. German athletes no longer participated since the Workers' Gymnastics and Sports Federation of Germany had been banned by the Nazi regime in 1933.

== Sports ==
- Athletics
- Basketball
- Basque pelota
- Boxing
- Chess
- Cycling
- Field handball (details)
- Football (details)
- Gymnastics
- Motor cycling
- Swimming
- Table tennis
- Tennis
- Tug of War
- Volleyball
- Water polo
- Weightlifting
- Wrestling

== Nations table ==
Place	Nation	Total Points	Men's Athletic	Women's Athletic	Men's Swimming	Women's Swimming	Water Polo	Football	Handball	Cycling	Greco-Roman Wrestling	Freestyle Wrestling	Weightlifting	Boxing	Balle Pelote	Basketball	Tennis	Badminton	Chess
1.	Finland	172	89	-	31	25	-	-	-	-	44	-	-	7	-	-	-	-	-
2.	Norway	162	48	5	26	25	-	3	-	4	6	-	-	13	-	-	-	-	2
3.	France	143	30	27	16	9	4	-	-	35	-	13	3	3	3	4	3	2	4
4.	Soviet Union	134	40	46	-	-	-	4	-	-	-	-	28	16	-	-	-	-	-
5.	Belgium	126	-	2	19	3	3	-	-	26	13	38	6	7	4	2	1	1	1
6.	Switzerland	60	27	9	-	-	-	-	4	-	-	8	19	-	-	-	-	-	-
7.	Netherlands	53	1	16	5	14	1	-	3	8	-	-	-	-	2	-	-	-	3
8.	Czechoslovakia	45	10	6	20	-	2	1	2	-	-	-	-	-	-	-	-	3	-
9.	Spain	40	6	1	16	4	-	2	-	5	-	-	-	-	-	2	3	-	-
10.	England	12	-	-	-	-	-	-	-	4	-	-	-	-	-	-	4	4	-
11.	Denmark	9	2	-	-	-	-	-	-	-	-	-	-	7	-	-	-	-	-
12.	Austria	8	2	3	-	-	-	-	-	-	-	-	3	-	-	-	-	-	-
13.	Palestine	5	-	4	-	-	-	-	-	-	-	-	-	-	-	1	-	-	-
13.	Latvia	5	-	5	-	-	-	-	-	-	-	-	-	-	-	-	-	-	-

The unofficial ranking system has been built considering: Gold medal: 4 points, Silver medal: 3 points, Bronze medal: 2 points, 4th place: 1 point

== Notable winners ==
- (Soviet Union) Moisey Kasyanik, weightlifting (60 kg)
- (Soviet Union) Mikhail Kasyanik, gymnastics
- (Soviet Union) Nikolay Korolyov, heavyweight boxing
- (Finland) Väinö Leskinen, 200 and 400 meter breaststroke swimming
- (Soviet Union) Seraphim Znamensky, 5,000 meters run
- (Soviet Union) Spartak Moscow, football
