= British Workers' Sports Federation =

Organization in Great Britain, 1923–1935

The British Workers' Sports Federation (BWSF) was a sports organization in Great Britain, active from 1923 to 1935. It was established by the National Clarion Cycling Club, Labour Party activists and trade unionists. The BWSF had branches across the country, but it was strongest in London, Manchester, South Wales and the industrial areas of Scotland.

In 1925 the BWSF participated in the first International Workers' Olympiads in Frankfurt am Main, and in 1927 the London Group of the BWSF sent a British workers' football team to play a series of matches in the Soviet Union.

From 1928 BWSF was essentially a wing of the Communist Party. As a result, moderate Labour Party members and unionists left the association. The BWSF soon joined the Comintern-led Red Sport International and participated in the 1928 Moscow Spartakiad. In 1930, the Labour Party and the Trades Union Congress founded the National Workers' Sports Association as a counterweight to the BWSF.
