= 1930–31 in Mandatory Palestine football =

Football in Mandatory Palestine
- Season: 1930–31

The 1930–31 season was the fourth season of competitive football in the British Mandate for Palestine under the Eretz Israel Football Association. During the season, the Arab Palestine Sports Federation was established as a rival to the Jewish-controlled EIFA.

== IFA Competitions ==
=== 1930–31 Palestine League ===
Palestine League
- Season: 1930–31
- Matches: 24
- Goals: 132 (5.5 per match)

An attempt was made to organize a Palestine League, with the participation of 11 clubs, both Jewish and British, in the top division and a second division divided into four regional leagues. However, league matches were suspended in November 1930 as British military teams were ordered not to play Jewish teams due to the tensions between the British Mandate government and the Jewish community following the publication of the Passfield white paper. An attempt to revive the league with Jewish clubs only also failed.

==== Table ====
Pos	Team	Pld	W	D	L	GF	GA	GR	Pts
1	Maccabi Tel Aviv	6	5	1	0	27	10	2.700	11
2	48th Regiment	4	4	0	0	23	1	23.000	8
3	Maccabi Petah Tikva	5	3	1	1	18	12	1.500	7 (Note: A match between Maccabi Petah Tikva and British Police was played and ended with a 5–4 victory to Petah Tikva. However, the result was annulled.)
4	RAF Ramla	9	3	0	6	22	36	0.611	6
5	British Police	3	2	0	1	9	6	1.500	4
6	Hapoel Haifa	5	1	2	2	6	10	0.600	4
7	Maccabi Hashmonai	3	1	1	1	7	7	1.000	3
8	RAF Jerusalem	4	1	0	3	8	12	0.667	2
9	Hapoel Tel Aviv	3	0	1	2	3	8	0.375	1
10	Staffords	1	0	0	1	0	4	0.000	0
11	Hapoel Jerusalem	3	0	0	3	0	17	0.000	0

Updated to match(es) played on 14 November 1930. Source: Do'ar HaYom

=== 1930–31 Second Division ===
Along with the first division, the EIFA planned to operate a Second Division (Mahlaka Bet), which was planned to be divided into four regional divisions, with mostly junior and reserve teams. It seems that Maccabi Yona won the Jerusalem division, During the season some of the participating teams withdrew from the competition, which forced the EIFA to operate just one division in the Tel Aviv area.

Jerusalem division

- 48th Regiment B
- Arzib
- British Police Res.
- Hapoel Jerusalem Res.
- Hercules
- Maccabi HaSemel
- Maccabi Nordia A
- Maccabi Nordia B
- Maccabi Yonah
- YMCA

Tel Aviv A division

- 48th Regiment B
- Bar Kochva Petah Tikva
- Hapoel Bnei Brak
- Hapoel HaSharon
- Hapoel Nes Tziona
- Hapoel Petah Tikva
- Hapoel Tel Aviv Res.
- Hapoel Tel Aviv C
- Jaffa Survey Department
- Maccabi Herzliya
- Maccabi Nes Tziona

Tel Aviv B division

- Hapoel Bemali Tel Aviv
- Hapoel Rehovot
- Jaffa Police
- Maccabi HaSharon
- Maccabi Nordia Tel Aviv
- Maccabi Petah Tikva Res.
- Maccabi Rehovot
- Maccabi Tel Aviv Res.
- Maccabi Trumpeldor Tel Aviv
- Palestine General Hospital
- RAF Ramla Res.

Haifa division

- Islamic SC
- Haifa Police B
- Hapoel Binyamina
- Hapoel Hadera
- Hapoel Haifa Res.
- Hapoel Naharayim
- Hapoel Nesher
- Maccabi Hadera
- Maccabi HaGibor Haifa
- Maccabi Zikhron Ya’akov
- Staffords B

== Notable events ==
- In October 1930 the Hapoel organization held the second Hapoel Games in Tel Aviv. In a single football match during the event a Jerusalem XI team (composed of Maccabi Hasmonean Jerusalem and British Police players) met a Hapoel XI (composed of Hapoel Tel Aviv and Hapoel Haifa players). The Hapoel XI won 2–0.
- In a meeting in held in June 1930 in Jaffa, the Arab Palestine Sports Federation was established, as a governing body for Arab sport activities.
- The football and tennis teams of the Egyptian University performed a brief tour in Tel Aviv and Jerusalem in February 1931. The football team played against Maccabi Tel Aviv, who were beaten 0–4 by the University XI, against The Orthodox Club of Jaffa, who were beaten 2–5, and a combined Maccabi Hashmonai and British Police XI, which had beaten the Egyptians 4–0
- In early March 1931 Hapoel Haifa visited Beirut, losing 1–3 to the American University of Beirut (AUB) XI, and beating Al Nahda SC 8–4. A week later Hapoel Tel Aviv made the same trip, losing 3–4 to the AUB XI, and 0–2 to Nahda.
- A Mandatory Palestine team, made of Hapoel players, took part in the 1931 Workers' Summer Olympiad football tournament, losing 1–3 to Hungary in the first round, and losing 0–4 to Norway in the consolation tournament. The single goal for the Hapoel team was scored by Stern.
