= International Workers' Olympiads =

1925–1937 international sporting event series

- Purpose: Alternative Olympic event for the members of Socialist Workers' Sport International
- Frequency: Every 6 years
- Inaugurated: Schreiberhau, Germany in 1925
- Most recent: Antwerp, Belgium in 1937
- Headquarters: Lucerne, Switzerland

International Workers' Olympiads were an international sporting event arranged between 1925 and 1937 by Socialist Workers' Sport International (SASI). It was an organisation supported by social democratic parties and International Federation of Trade Unions. Workers' Olympiads were an alternate event for the Olympic Games. The participants were members of various labor sports associations and came mostly from Europe. Nowadays the CSIT World Sports Games are the successor sports events of the International Workers' Olympiads. The "World Sports Games" is the main highlight and a new brand of the International Workers and Amateurs in Sports Confederation (CSIT). It is a sports event for thousands of workers and amateurs held every two years. The CSIT is an international multi-sports organization.

== History ==
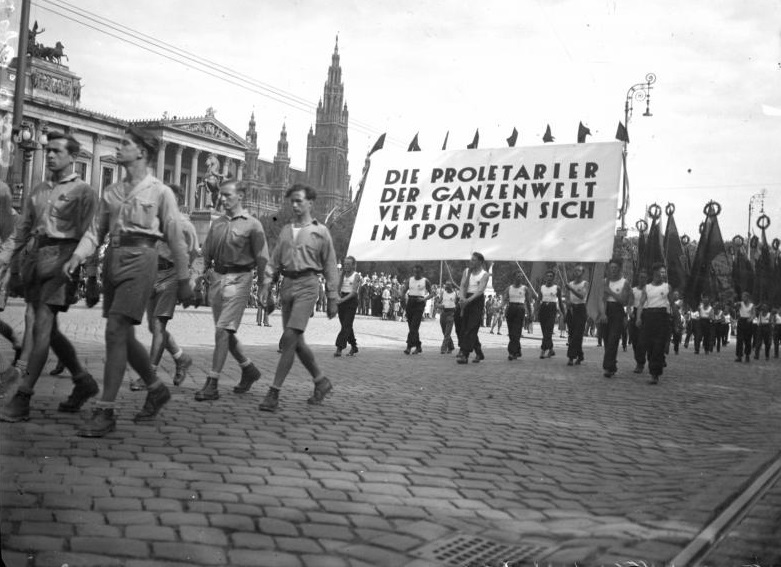
Opening march of the 1931 Workers' Olympiad in Vienna.

The Workers' Olympiads were created as a counterweight for the Olympic Games, which were criticized for being confined for the upper social classes and privileged people. The international workers' sports movement did not believe that the true Olympic spirit could be achieved in an Olympic movement dominated by the aristocratic leadership. Pierre de Coubertin, founder of the International Olympic Committee, had always opposed women's participation and supported the cultural superiority of white Europeans over other races. His followers, Henri de Baillet-Latour and Avery Brundage, were openly anti-semitic and both collaborated with the Nazis. On the contrary, the Workers' Olympiads opposed all kinds of chauvinism, sexism, racism and social exclusiveness. The Olympic Games were based in rivalry between the nations, but the Workers' Olympiads stressed internationalism, friendship, solidarity and peace.

The Lucerne Sport International (later known as Socialist Workers' Sport International) was established in Lucerne, Switzerland in 1920. The first unofficial Workers' Olympiads were held a year later in Prague, Czechoslovakia. The IOC had banned the losing side of the World War I from the 1920 Summer Olympics, but the Workers's Olympiads were open for the "enemy" side as well. The number of participating countries was thirteen. The first official Worker's Olympiads were the 1925 winter games in the German town of Schreiberhau, which today is a part of Poland. They were followed by the first Summer Olympiads in Frankfurt am Main.

National flags were not used, but a red flag of international workers' movement. The best athletes were awarded with diplomas, they did not receive medals like in the Olympic Games. The visiting athletes stayed mostly at private accommodation of local families.

International Workers' Olympiads were more than just a games for the top athletes. The festival was based on a mass participation, it did not restrict entry on the grounds of sporting ability. 1931 Workers' Summer Olympiad in Vienna was the largest event with the participation of 100,000 athletes from 26 countries. The Vienna Workers' Olympiad attracted some 250,000 spectators. It was much bigger event than the 1932 Summer Olympics at Los Angeles, both in number of participants as well as spectators. Praterstadion (now Ernst-Happel-Stadion) was constructed between 1929 and 1931 for the 1931 Olympiad. The last Workers' Olympiad at Antwerp in 1937 was a joint event with the Red Sport International organized Spartakiads.

== Olympiads, hosts and number of participating countries ==
Olympiad	Date	Host Country	Host City	Number of countries
1921 Olympiad (unofficial)	June 25 – June 29, 1921	Czechoslovakia	Prague	13
1925 Winter Olympiad	January 31 – February 2, 1925	Germany	Schreiberhau	4
1925 Summer Olympiad	July 24 – 28, 1925	Germany	Frankfurt am Main	11
1931 Winter Olympiad	February 5 – 8, 1931	Austria	Mürzzuschlag	7
1931 Summer Olympiad	July 19 – 26, 1931	Austria	Vienna	26
1937 Winter Olympiad	February 18 – 21, 1937	Czechoslovakia	Janské Lázně	7
1937 Summer Olympiad	July 25 – August 1, 1937	Belgium	Antwerp	15
1943 Summer Olympiad	Cancelled due to World War II	Finland	Helsinki	–

== Participating countries and federations ==
Note: the table below is incomplete. Only the participating countries of 1925 and 1937 Winter Olympiads and 1925 Summer Olympiads are correct.

Country	Federations	W25	S25	W31	S31	W37	S37
Czechoslovakia	Czechoslovak Workers' Gymnastic Association	×	×	×	×	×	×
Finland	Finnish Workers' Sports Federation	×	×	×	×	×	×
Austria	Arbeiterbund für Sport und Körperkultur in Österreich	×	×	×	×		
Germany	Arbeiter-Turn- und Sportbund	×	×	×	×		
Switzerland	Schweizerischen Arbeiter-Turn- und Sportverbandes		×	×	×	×	×
France	Fédération sportive et gymnique du travail		×	?	×	×	×
Poland	Polish Workers' Sport Federation		×	?	×	×	×
Latvia			×	×	×		?
Belgium	Arbeidersvoetbalbond		×		×		×
Belgium	Association Francophone du Sport Travailliste Belge		×		×		×
United Kingdom	British Workers' Sports Federation		×				
United Kingdom	National Workers' Sports Association				×		×
Free City of Danzig			×		?		
Denmark	Dansk Arbejder Idraetsforbund			?	×	×	×
Hungary				?	×	×	×
Norway	Arbeidernes Idrettsforbund			?	×		×
Mandatory Palestine	Hapoel				×		×
Estonia	Eesti Töölisspordi Liit				×		?
Netherlands	Nederlandse Arbeiders SportBond				?		×
Soviet Union							×
Spanish Republic							×

== Sports ==
=== Summer Olympiads ===
Sport	1925	1931	1937
Athletics	×	×	×
Boxing	×	×	×
Cycling	×	×	×
Football	×	×	×
Gymnastics	×	×	×
Swimming	×	×	×
Water polo	×	×	×
Wrestling	×	×	×
Chess		×	×
Czech handball		×	×
Motor cycling		×	×
Weightlifting		×	×
Canoeing		×	
Fencing		×	
Rowing		×	
Basketball			×
Basque pelota			×
Table tennis			×
Tennis			×
Tug of war			×
Volleyball			×

=== Winter Olympiads ===
Sport	1925	1931	1937
Nordic skiing	×	×	×
Alpine skiing		×	×
Figure skating		×	×
Bobsleigh		×	
Ice hockey		×	
Ice stock sport		×	
Speed skating		×	
