= Fédération sportive du Travail d'Alsace et de Lorraine =

Fédération sportive du Travail d'Alsace et de Lorraine (French for 'Labour Sports Federation of Alsace and Lorraine', abbreviated FSTAL) was a labour sports federation in Alsace-Lorraine during the interbellum period. FSTAL was organized separately from the French Fédération sportive du Travail (FST). During the spring of 1923, FSTAL had 11,542 members whilst FST had a total membership of about 5,000. FSTAL published Le Sport Ouvrier ('Workers Sport').

As of 1923 communists had gained the majority in FSTAL, and the organization became affiliated with the Red Sport International (Sportintern). Its organs began to violently denounce the reformist Socialist Workers' Sport International (also known as the 'Lucerne Sport International').

Sectors dissatisfied with the communist turn inside FSTAL gradually left the organization. In December 1926, socialists founded the Fédération sportive et gymnastique du Travail d'Alsace et de Lorraine (FSGTAL) in order to counter the influence of FSTAL. However, in 1929 FSTAL obtained (in spite of its public criticisms against the body) membership in the Lucerne Sport International.

As of 1931, FSTAL had a membership estimated at around 10,000, double the size of the socialist FSGTAL. Its membership was at the time comparable to the FST.

In February 1935, FSTAL and FSGTAL merged into FSGT.
