= Red Sports Federation =

The Red Sports Federation (Spanish: Federación Roja del Deporte) was a workers' sport organization in Uruguay. Politically it was aligned with the Communist Party of Uruguay. The Red Sports Federation was founded in 1924, through the help of the Young Communist League of Uruguay. Sports clubs affiliated with the Red Sports Federation carried names such as 'Lenin', 'Club Atlético Leningrado' ('Leningrad Athletic Club'), 'Hacia la igualdad' ('Towards equality'), 'La Comuna' ('The Commune'), 'Aurora Roja', 'Guardia Roja' and 'La Checa'. The Red Sports Federation was an affiliate of the Red Sport International (Sportintern).

The Uruguayan Red Sports Federation participated in the first World Spartakiad, held in the Moscow, Soviet Union in 1928.

As of 1935, the Red Sports Federation had around 3,000 members.
