= 1943 Workers' Summer Olympiad =

- Host city: Helsinki, Finland
- Dates: Cancelled due to World War II
- Main venue: Helsinki Olympic Stadium

The 1943 Workers' Summer Olympiad, which were to be the seventh edition of the International Workers' Olympiads, were cancelled due to World War II. They were to have been arranged by the Finnish Workers' Sports Federation and held in Helsinki, Finland.

== Nomination and planning ==
Finnish Workers' Sports Federation decided to apply the 1943 Workers' Summer Olympiads in 1936, right after the Finnish Olympic Committee had lost the bidding process for the 1940 Summer Olympics. The Socialist Workers' Sport International finally awarded the games to Helsinki in 1938. A year later, the city was also nominated the host of the 1940 Olympics as Tokyo rejected the games.

The main venue for both games was to be the 1938 completed Helsinki Olympic Stadium. Although the pre-war sporting life in Finland was split in two and the Finnish Workers' Sports Federation's athletes did not compete at the "bourgeoisie" Olympic Games, the federation took part at the construction project of the Olympic Stadium in addition to be the host of the Workers' Olympiads. Both games were later cancelled due to the war. Unlike the Olympic Movement, the Workers' Olympiads did not recover after the war and the future games were never held.
