= Moisey Kasyanik =

Soviet weightlifter (1911–1988)

Moisey Davidovich Kasyanik
Personal information
- Nationality: Soviet
- Born: January 1, 1911 Novo-Zhitomir, Kherson Guberniya (Russian Empire)
- Died: 1988 (aged 76–77) Leningrad, Soviet Union

Sport
- Sport: Weightlifting
Medal record
Men's Weightlifting
Representing Soviet Union
International Workers' Olympiad
| Gold medal – first place | 1937 Antwerp |
World Championships
| Bronze medal – third place | 1946 Paris | 60 kg |
European Championships
| Bronze medal – third place | 1947 Helsinki | 60 kg |

Moisey Davidovich Kasyanik (Russian: Моисе́й Дави́дович Касья́ник, also "Moisei and Moysey" and "Kas'ianik, Kosyanik, or Kosianiki"; born January 1, 1911 – 1988) was a Soviet weightlifter.

He was Jewish, and was born in Novo-Zhitomyr, Kherson Guberniya (Russian Empire).

He won a gold medal at the 1937 Workers' Olympiad in Antwerp, and won bronze medals at the 1946 World Weightlifting Championships in Paris (60 kg) and at the 1947 European Weightlifting Championships in Helsinki (60 kg).
