= LZS =

LZS may refer to:

- Latvijas Zemnieku savienība, a political party in Latvia
- Lempel–Ziv–Stac, a lossless data compression algorithm
- Leutnant zur See, a rank in the German Navy
- Ludowe Zespoły Sportowe, a union of Polish sport clubs
