= 1931 Workers' Winter Olympiad =

- Host city: Mürzzuschlag, Austria
- Nations: 7
- Events: 16
- Dates: February 5, 1931– February 8, 1931

The 1931 Workers' Winter Olympiad was the third edition of International Workers' Olympiads and the second Winter Olympiad. The games were held from February 5 to February 8 at the Austrian town of Mürzzuschlag.

== Nordic skiing ==
=== Men's 15 km cross-country skiing ===
| Place | Competitor | Time |
|---|---|---|
| 1 | (Finland) Heikki Norojärvi | 53.51 |
| 2 | (Finland) Martti Salminen | 54.06 |
| 3 | (Finland) Matti Kääriä | 54.17 |

=== Men's 30 km cross-country skiing ===
Race cancelled.

=== Men's 3 km steeplechase skiing ===
| Place | Competitor | Time |
|---|---|---|
| 1 | (Finland) Martti Salminen | 5.18 |
| 2 | (Germany) Karl Mannhardt | 6.17 |
| 3 | (Germany) Hans Eichberger | 6.24 |

=== Men's 10 km downhill cross-country skiing ===
| Place | Competitor | Time |
|---|---|---|
| 1 | (Germany) Karl Mannhardt | 24.04 |
| 2 | (Austria) Franz Berner | 25.25 |
| 3 | (Austria) Rupert Weinberger | 26.15 |

=== Women's 4 km cross-country skiing ===
| Place | Competitor | Time |
|---|---|---|
| 1 | (Finland) Impi Lahtinen | 12.50 |
| 2 | (Finland) Ester Korholin | 13.01 |
| 3 | (Finland) Aliisa Suvanto | 13.36 |

=== Women's 6 km cross-country skiing ===
| Place | Competitor | Time |
|---|---|---|
| 1 | (Finland) Impi Lahtinen | 17.44 |
| 2 | (Finland) Ester Korholin | 18,47 |
| 3 | (Finland) Aliisa Suvanto | 18.49 |

=== Men's 10 km team skiing ===
| Place | Competitor | Time |
|---|---|---|
| 1 | Finland 1 | 23.16 |
| 2 | Finland 2 | 24.51 |
| 3 | Germany | 27.21 |

=== Men's Nordic combined ===
| Place | Competitor | Points |
|---|---|---|
| 1 | (Finland) Arvo Talsi | 36.71 |
| 2 | (Germany) Max Hess | 35.38 |
| 3 | (Germany) Gustav Häusler | 35.33 |

=== Men's ski jumping ===
| Place | Competitor | Points |
|---|---|---|
| 1 | (Germany) Gustav Häusler | 18.113 |
| 2 | (Finland) Arvo Talsi | 18.050 |
| 3 | (Czechoslovakia) Edwin Günther | 17.580 |

== Speed skating ==
=== Men's 500 m ===
| Place | Competitor | Time |
|---|---|---|
| 1 | (Finland) Paavo Virtanen | 48.4 |
| 2 | (Finland) Viljo Pihl | 49.4 |
| 3 | (Finland) Kalle Flinck | 50.4 |

=== Men's 1500 m ===
| Place | Competitor | Time |
|---|---|---|
| 1 | (Finland) Paavo Virtanen | 2:39.0 |
| 2 | (Finland) Viljo Pihl | 2:40.4 |
| 3 | (Finland) Kalle Flinck | 2:41.0 |

=== Men's 5000 m ===
| Place | Competitor | time |
|---|---|---|
| 1 | (Finland) Viljo Pihl | 9:32.0 |
| 2 | (Finland) Paavo Virtanen | 9:36.3 |
| 3 | (Finland) Kalle Flinck | 9:43.4 |

=== Men's 10000 m ===
| Place | Competitor | Time |
|---|---|---|
| 1 | (Finland) Viljo Pihl | 20:32.8 |
| 2 | (Finland) Paavo Virtanen | 20:40.9 |
| 3 | (Latvia) Robert Vitthof | 21:22.7 |

== Figure skating ==
=== Men's singles ===
| Place | Competitor | Points |
|---|---|---|
| 1 | (Austria) Istvan Schlichtinger | 245.5 |
| 2 | (Latvia) Vielniek | 242.0 |
| 3 | (Austria) Adolf Schima | 213.6 |

=== Ladies' singles ===
| Place | Competitor | Points |
|---|---|---|
| 1 | (Austria) Elfriede Gönner | 62.3 |
| 2 | (Austria) Lotte Ronay | 55.6 |
| 3 | (Austria) Ricker | 51.5 |

=== Pair skating ===
| Place | Competitor | Points |
|---|---|---|
| 1 | (Austria) Elfriede Gönner and Rudolf Lang | 10.3 |
| 2 | (Austria) Marie Trimmel and Karl Schenkirs | 9.9 |
| 3 | (Austria) Hermine Adamek and Rubetz | 3.8 |

== Men's ice hockey ==
| Team | GP | W | L | T | GF | GA | PTS | AUT | LAT | GER |
|---|---|---|---|---|---|---|---|---|---|---|
| Austria | 2 | 2 | 0 | 0 | 7 | 2 | 4 | | 3-2 | 4-0 |
| Latvia | 2 | 1 | 1 | 0 | 5 | 4 | 2 | | | 3-1 |
| Germany | 2 | 0 | 2 | 0 | 1 | 7 | 0 | | | |

== Country ranking ==
Participating nations are ranked by positions, since no medals were awarded at the Workers' Olympiads.

| Rank | Country | 1st place | 2nd place | 3rd place |
|---|---|---|---|---|
| 1 | Finland | 10 | 8 | 6 |
| 2 | Austria | 4 | 3 | 4 |
| 3 | Germany | 1 | 2 | 3 |
| 4 | Latvia | 0 | 2 | 1 |
| 5 | Czechoslovakia | 0 | 0 | 1 |

== Sources ==
- Väinö Koivula: "TUL Vuosikirja 1931" (Finnish Workers' Sports Federation Yearbook 1931).
