= Finnish Workers' Sports Federation =

Finnish amateur sports organization

- Formation: 26 January 1919
- Type: Sports federation
- Headquarters: Helsinki, Finland
- Members: 1,000 associations, 280,000 individual members
- Chairman: Lasse Mikkelsson
- Website: tul.fi

The Finnish Workers' Sports Federation (Finnish: Suomen Työväen Urheiluliitto, TUL, Swedish: Arbetarnas Idrottsförbund i Finland, AIF) is a Finnish amateur sports organization founded in 1919. In addition to the competitive sports, TUL focuses on youth activities and youth education as well as offering activities regardless of age, gender, ethnicity or financial means. TUL is one of the member associations of the Finnish Olympic Committee.

TUL is affiliated with the Central Organisation of Finnish Trade Unions as well as the Social Democratic Party of Finland and Left Alliance. It is also a member of the International Labour Sports Federation (CSIT). TUL currently has more than 280,000 members, active in 1,000 clubs in 59 different sports.

== History ==
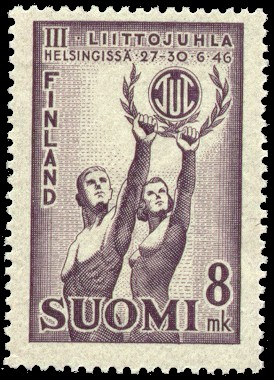
A postage stamp celebrating the 1946 Federation Festival

=== Early years ===
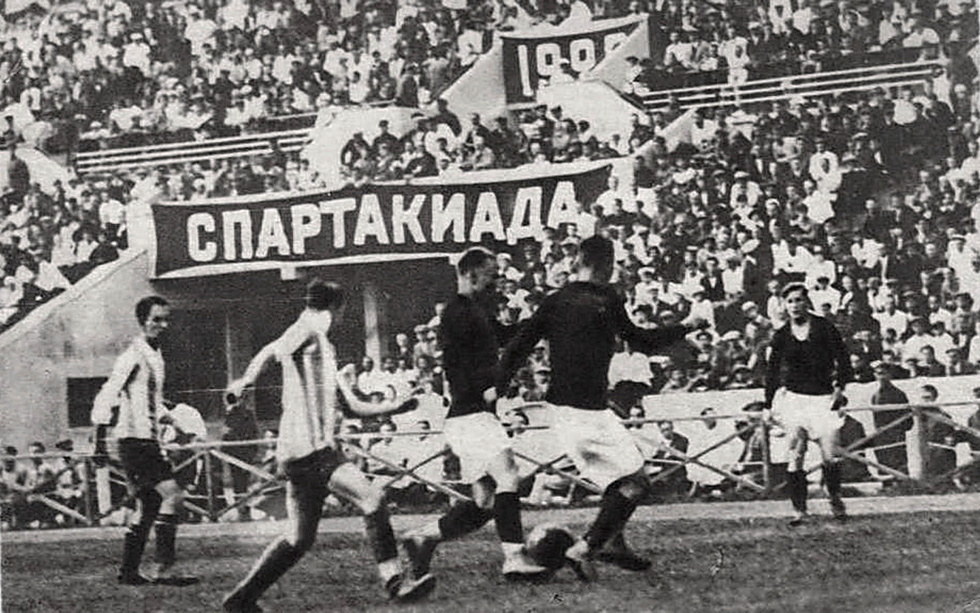
1928 Moscow All-Union Spartakiad football match Uruguay (Federación Roja del Deporte) vs. Finland (Finnish Workers' Sports Association) at the Dynamo Stadium

After the 1918 Finnish Civil War, the Finnish Gymnastics and Sports Federation (SVUL) dismissed all clubs and athletes who had participated the war on the Red side. On 26 January 1919, 56 labour movement related clubs founded the new workers' sports central association Finnish Workers' Sports Federation (Suomen Työväen Urheiluliitto, TUL). During the first year, a 78 newly established clubs joined the federation, and by the end of 1919, TUL had about 10,000 members. In the next decade, the number rose up to 450 clubs with approximately 35,000 individual members.

The establishment of TUL led into a dispersion in the Finnish sports as there was no cooperation between TUL and SVUL. Both associations created their own practise and competition systems, the Finnish championship titles were decided by SVUL athletes as TUL had own championships. Also the Finland national teams were composed only of SVUL athletes. In 1920, TUL was a founding member of the Socialist Workers' Sport International and later had also relations with the Red Sport International. Instead of the ″bourgeoise″ Olympic Games, the TUL athletes participated the Workers' Olympiads and the Spartakiads. In 1921, TUL sent a team to the Workers' Sports Festival in Prague, and in September 1922, the Finnish Workers' Sports Federation football team toured Soviet Russia. This was also the first international contact for Soviet sports after the 1917 October Revolution.

=== Anti-Communist suppression ===
Since the founding of TUL, the Social Democrats and Communists struggled for power inside the federation. Finally in 1927, the Social Democrats gained majority, and TUL denied all contacts with the Soviet led Red Sport International. Eighty clubs still sent athletes to the 1928 winter and summer Spartakiads in Oslo and Moscow. This ended up to the dismiss of 80 clubs in the fall of 1929, and the Communist-led clubs established a shortly-lived central organization Työläisurheilun Yhtenäisyyskomitea (The Unification Committee of the Labour Sports), launched in December 1929.

At the same time, fascism reached foothold in the Finnish society. In 1930, the Parliament of Finland passed the anti-Communist laws, hundreds of organizations and newspapers that were considered as communist were banned. Among these organizations were 147 TUL member associations. For example, Finland's second largest sports club, Jyry Helsinki, was disbanded. The banned clubs were not able to re-organize until the end of World War II. Since 1932, TUL also lost its governmental grants for two years.

=== Period of cooperation ===
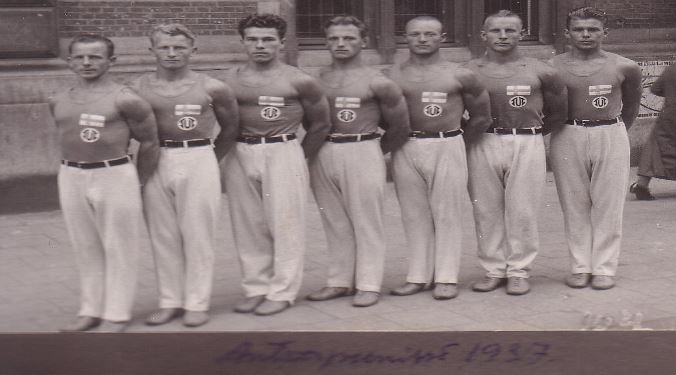
Finnish gymnastics team at the 1937 Workers' Olympiad in Antwerp, Belgium.

During the 1920s and the 1930s, more than 70 top athletes defected from the TUL clubs in order to compete in the Olympics. Between 1920 and 1936, 34 former TUL athletes participated the Olympic Games, 15 of them won a total of 23 medals. Since the early 1930s, 13 former TUL footballers were selected to the Finland national football team.

After the 1936 Berlin Olympics, TUL and SVUL launched negotiations of cooperation as Helsinki was elected to host the 1940 Summer Olympics. Finally, in 1939 the parties signed a cooperation agreement. The TUL and SVUL athletes competed together for the first time in June 1939 as the TUL and Finnish Football Association teams played against each other at the Helsinki Olympic Stadium. The 1940 Summer Olympics were soon postponed due to the World War II, but TUL and SVUL continued their cooperation through the 1940s. In 1948, TUL athletes participated the Olympic Games for the first time, winning three medals, including one gold. The 37-year fragmented period finally came to an end in 1956, as the TUL and FA football series were merged.

=== Post-war years ===
In 1959, TUL split due to the internal dispute among the Social Democrats. The minority led by Emil Skog left the party, which also dispersed TUL. The Skog supporters formed the Työväen Urheiluseurojen Keskusliitto (The Central Organization of the Labour Sports Associations), which was active until 1979, although Emil Skog himself returned the party in 1964. The dispute also caused that TUL athlete were not send to the 1960 Olympics.

Despite the cooperation, the political debates between TUL and SVUL survived even to the 1990s. The number of individual members in TUL peaked at 380,000 in the early 1980s. In 2001, TUL had 337,000 members.

== Festivals and Sports academy ==
The ″Federation Festivals″ (Liittojuhlat) were launched in 1927 and have been arranged 12 times since. The largest festival with up to 36,000 participants was held in 1946. The TUL sports academy Kisakeskus was opened in Raseborg in 1958.

== Chairmen ==
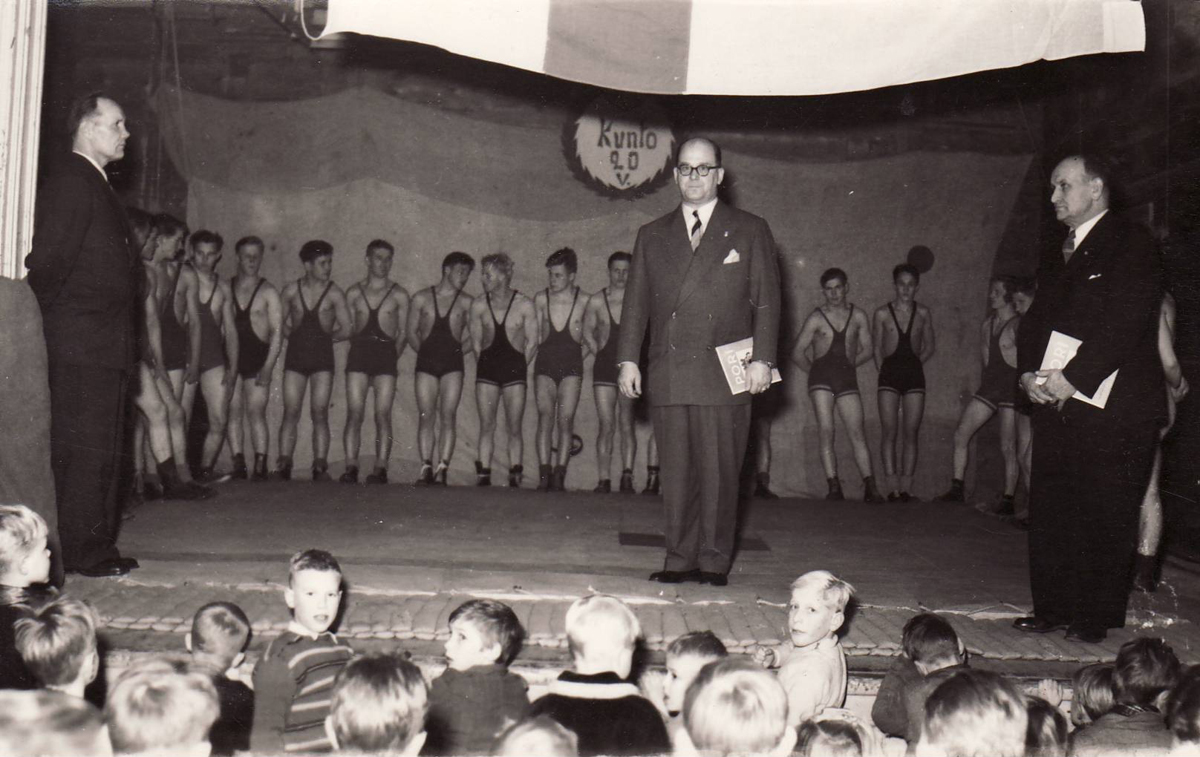
President of the Finnish Workers' Sports Federation and a member of the Finnish Olympic Committee Mr Olavi Suvanto at the 20th anniversary of athletics club Reposaaren Kunto in Pori, Finland, 1952.

- Eino Pekkala 1919–1927
- Väinö Mikkola 1927–1928
- Toivo Wilppula 1928–1937
- Urho Rinne 1937–1945
- Olavi Suvanto 1945–1951
- Väinö Leskinen 1951–1955
- Penna Tervo 1955–1956
- Pekka Martin 1956–1967
- Olavi Saarinen 1967–1971
- Osmo Kaipainen 1971–1977
- Matti Ahde 1977–1995
- Kalevi Olin 1995–2007
- Sirpa Paatero 2007–2016
- Kimmo Suomi 2016–2019
- Lasse Mikkelsson 2019–

== Olympic medalists ==
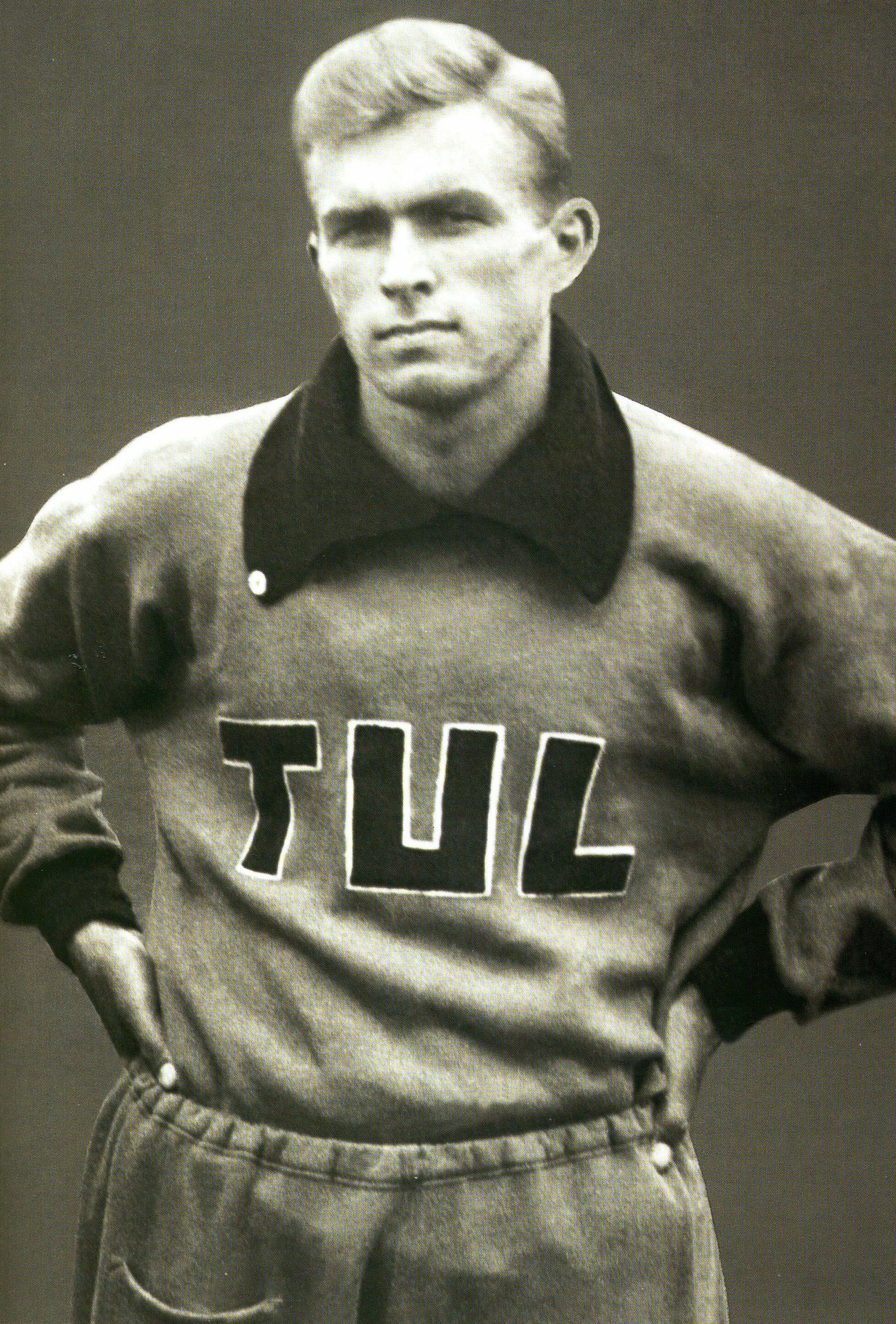
1948 Olympic gold medalist Tapio Rautavaara in the 1937 Workers' Olympiads.

The following athletes represented a Finnish Workers' Sports Federation's member association while winning an Olympic medal. Due to political reasons, TUL did not send athletes to the Olympics in 1920–1936 and again in 1960.

Gold

- Tapio Rautavaara (London 1948, javelin throw)
- Kelpo Gröndahl (Helsinki 1952, wrestling)
- Marjut Lukkarinen (Albertville 1992, cross-country skiing)

Silver

- Kelpo Gröndahl (London 1948, wrestling)
- Reima Virtanen (Munich 1972, boxing)
- Tapio Sipilä (Los Angeles 1984, wrestling)
- Marjut Lukkarinen (Albertville 1992, cross-country skiing)
- Ismo Falck (Barcelona 1992, men's team archery)
- Jani Sievinen (Atlanta 1996, swimming)

Bronze

- Reino Kangasmäki (London 1948, wrestling)
- Paavo Aaltonen, Kaino Lempinen, Kalevi Viskari (Helsinki 1952, men's team all-around gymnastics)
- Toivo Salonen (Cortina d'Ampezzo 1956, speed skating)
- Voitto Hellstén (Melbourne 1956, 400 metres)
- Jorma Valkama (Melbourne 1956, long jump)
- Taisto Kangasniemi (Melbourne 1956, wrestling)
- Kalevi Suoniemi, Martti Mansikka (Melbourne 1956, men's team all-around gymnastics)
- Hannu Rantakari (Tokyo 1964, gymnastics)
- Tapio Sipilä (Seoul 1988, wrestling)

== See also ==
- TUL Cup
- Finnish Workers' Sports Federation football team
