= Väinö Leskinen =

Finnish politician (1917–1972)

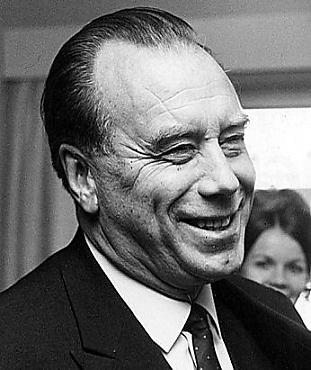
Väinö Leskinen in 1964

Väinö Olavi Leskinen (8 March 1917, in Helsinki – 8 March 1972, in Helsinki) was a Finnish politician, minister and a member of the parliament from Social Democratic Party of Finland. He is perceived as one of the major Finnish social democratic politicians of the 1950s and 1960s.

== Sports career and personal life ==
Before his political career Leskinen was a successful swimmer in the association of Helsinki Workers' Swimmers. He won the 200 and 400 meter breaststroke events at the 1937 Workers' Olympiad in Antwerp. Leskinen was later the Secretary General of the Finnish Workers' Sports Federation 1940-1943 and the chairman 1951–1955. Leskinen fought in the Winter and Continuation Wars. He was wounded in 1941. His military denomination was a Major.

Leskinen was married to the Olympic swimmer Margit Leskinen.

== Political career ==
Leskinen was a key member in the union of brother's in arms movement which operated among the Social Democrats after the war. The group was called 'asevelisosialistit' and it defeated the Communists in the fight for a majority in several left-wing organizations. In the 1950s the fragmented Social Democratic Party was led by Väinö Tanner as figurehead while Leskinen was considered as one of the most important leaders. He was discredited by the Communist Party of the Soviet Union because of his Western-oriented political views.

Leskinen sought to offset the relations with the Soviet Union following the defeat of SDP in the 1962 parliamentary election. He also tried to increase cooperation among the Left in Finland. Leskinen led the negotiations for the founding of Central Organisation of Finnish Trade Unions. In 1966, Leskinen visited Moscow in an effort to re-establish relations with the Communist Party of Soviet Union. Leskinen and SDP supported Urho Kekkonen in the 1968 presidential election.

Leskinen was a member of the parliament from 1945 to 1947 and 1947–1969. His career as minister is divided into two parts. During the 1940s and 1950s, he was in the cabinet as a right-wing representative of SDP. After the reconciliation with the Soviet Union, he was a closer associate of Urho Kekkonen.

- Minister for Social Affairs 1952–1953
- Minister of the Interior 1954–1955
- Minister for Social Welfare 1958–1959
- Minister of Trade and Industry 1968–1970
- Minister of Foreign Affairs 1970–1971

Väinö Leskinen died of a heart attack on his 55th birthday while skiing near Lauttasaari in Helsinki.
