= Popular Sports Teams =

Union of Polish sport clubs

Ludowe Zespoły Sportowe
- Abbreviation: LZS
- Formation: March 10, 1946; 80 years ago
- Founded at: Czarnowąsy
- Headquarters: Warsaw
- Location: Poland
- Region served: Rural Poland
- Website: lzs.pl

Ludowe Zespoły Sportowe (LZS) (Polish, in English Popular Sports Teams) is a union of Polish sport clubs, mainly drawn from villages and small towns.

== History ==
The union was established in 1946, with the first sport club LZS Czarnowąsy in Opole Voivodeship. It was initially a subset of the Inspectorate of Physical Education and Sport under the Samopomoc Chłopska (Peasant Mutual Aid) organizations in villages and small towns. However, structures were established at the province or Voivodeship levels by 1950, due to the LZS's popularity.

From the very beginning, the LZS has been connected with the Polish peasant movement. It had ties with local farmers' organisations and the United People's Party, and it is still supported by local structures of Polish People's Party.

== Goals ==
The goals of LZS activity are to lead in the range of physical education and sport. It organizes and promotes sports for villages and their surrounding areas, and improves the social and cultural aspects to its members, who program the main directions for the main council of LZS.

== Popular clubs ==
The best known clubs in the union are Igloopol Dębica (formerly in Polish First Division in football) and Kmita Zabierzów.

== Membership ==
The LZS is member of the International Sport and Culture Association.
