= Hannu Rantakari =

Finnish artistic gymnast

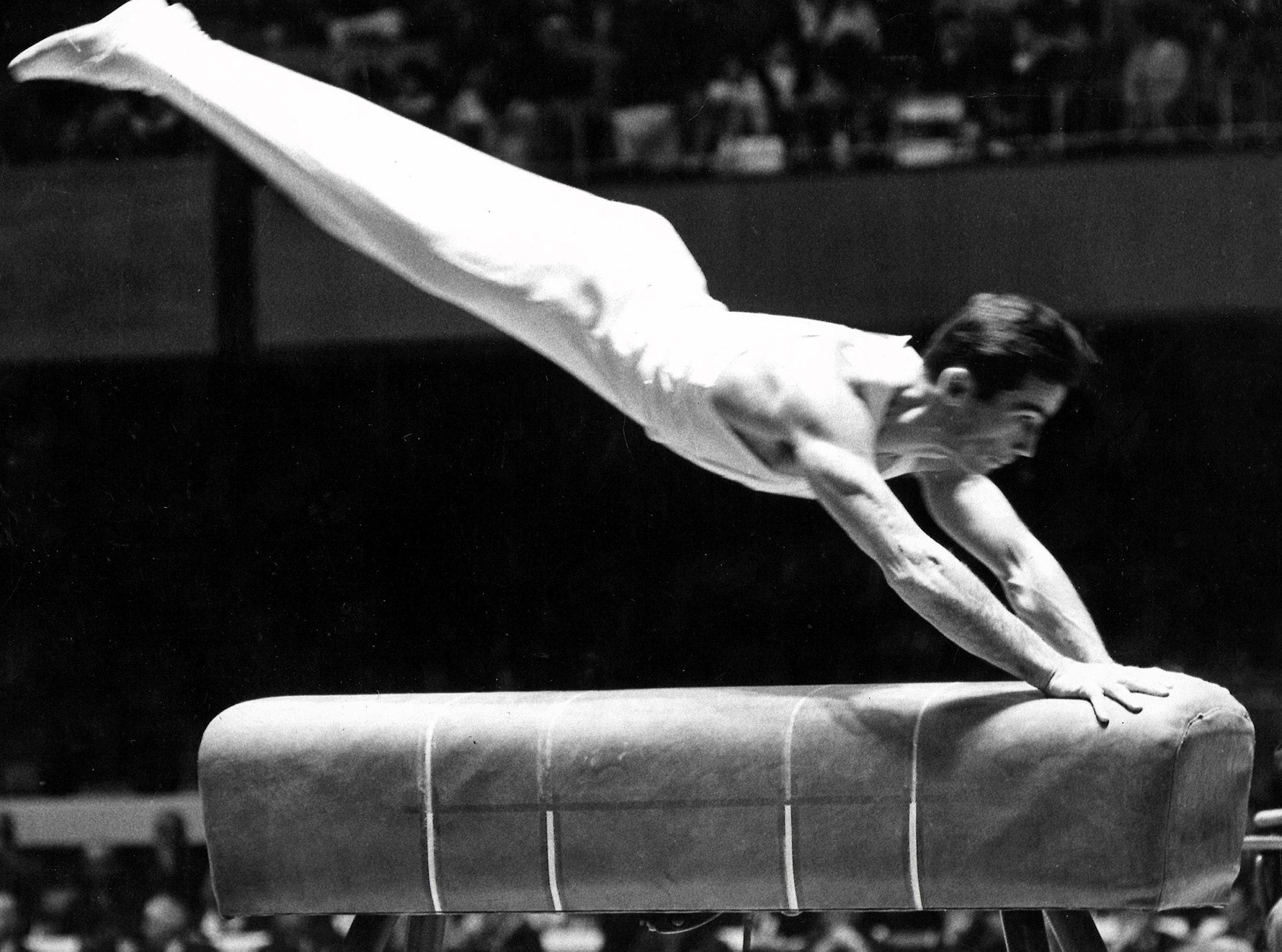
- Rantakari at the 1964 Summer Olympics

Personal information
- Full name: Hannu Juhani Rantakari
- Born: 8 January 1939 Tampere, Finland
- Died: 1 January 2018 (aged 78) Tampere, Finland
- Height: 1.72 m (5 ft 8 in)

Gymnastics career
- Discipline: Men's artistic gymnastics
- Country represented: Finland
Medal record
Men's artistic gymnastics
Representing Finland
Olympic Games
Bronze medal – third place	1964 Tokyo	Vault

Hannu Juhani Rantakari (8 January 1939 – 1 January 2018) was a Finnish gymnast. He competed at the 1964 and 1968 Summer Olympics in all artistic gymnastics events and won a bronze medal in the vault in 1964. His best individual result in other events was 26th place on floor in 1964.

Between 1963 and 1967 Rantakari won six national titles. He was chosen as Finnish Workers' Sports Federation (TUL) best athlete of the year in 1961 and 1964. He was ranked 14th in 1964 and 20th in 1965 in the world gymnastics ranking.
