= Fédération sportive et gymnastique du Travail d'Alsace et de Lorraine =

Fédération sportive et gymnastique du Travail d'Alsace et de Lorraine ('Labour Sports and Gymnastics Federation of Alsace and Lorraine', abbreviated FSGTAL) was a workers' sport organization in Alsace and Lorraine. FSGTAL was founded in December 1926, and was socialist in its political orientation. It was founded in order to counter the influence of communist Fédération sportive du Travail d'Alsace et de Lorraine (FSTAL). Socialist sectors had begun to break away from FSTAL in February 1926. FSGTAL was affiliated with the Socialist Workers' Sport International (the 'Lucerne Sport International').

As of 1931, FSGTAL had 25 affiliated sports societies and 3,000 members.

In February 1935, FSTAL and FSGTAL merged into FSGT.
