= 1931 Workers' Summer Olympiad =

Third edition of International Workers' Olympiads

- Host city: Vienna, Austria
- Nations: 26
- Dates: July 19, 1931– July 26, 1931

The 1931 Workers' Olympiad was the third edition of the International Workers' Olympiads. The games were held from 19 to 26 July in Vienna, Austria.

Some 100,000 athletes participated in the Olympiad, including those taking part at the mass gymnastics event. The games had about 250,000 spectators, making them larger than the 1932 Los Angeles Olympics both in participants and spectators. The opening ceremony, Das Große Festspiel, was written by the Austrian writer Robert Lucas with music composed by the Argentinian composer Erwin Leuchter together with Franz Leo Human.

The Workers' Olympiad was the largest sporting event held in Vienna up to that date. The Praterstadion (today known as Ernst-Happel-Stadion) and an outdoor swimming pool, the Stadionbad, were finished for the games. The final of the football tournament was played at Praterstadion in front of 60,000 spectators as the Austrian amateur team Freie Vereinigung der Amateur-Fußballvereine Österreichs beat the German team Arbeiter-Turn- und Sportbund 3–2.

== Sports ==
- Athletics
- Boxing
- Canoeing
- Chess
- Cycling
- Czech or Field handball (details)
- Fencing
- Football (details)
- Gymnastics
- Motor cycling
- Rowing
- Swimming
- Water polo
- Weightlifting
- Wrestling
