= European Fair Play Movement =

- Abbreviation: EFPM
- Formation: May 27, 1994; 32 years ago
- Founded at: Zurich, Switzerland
- Type: Non-governmental organization
- Legal status: Non-profit
- Purpose: Promotion of fair play, respect, tolerance, and solidarity in sport
- Headquarters: Brussels, Belgium
- Location: Brussels, Belgium
- Region served: Europe
- Members: Approximately 35 National Olympic Committees and recognized organizations; nearly 20 European or international sports federations
- Official language: English
- President: Philippe Housiaux
- Main organ: General Assembly
- Affiliations: National Olympic Committees, European sports bodies, educational institutions
- Website: fairplayeur.eu

The European Fair Play Movement (EFPM) is a non governmental grassroots sports organisation that promotes the values of fair play, respect, tolerance, and solidarity within sport and society across Europe. It organises events, educational activities, and award programmes to recognise and encourage ethical behaviour in sport.

== Background ==
The European Fair Play Movement was founded on 27–28 May 1994 at FIFA House in Zurich, Switzerland, when representatives from 14 European countries established a continental body to promote ethical sport and fair play values. The organisation grew from several years of cooperation among national fair play committees and sport representatives. Originally based in Zurich, the headquarters later moved to Vienna, Austria (2013) and then to Brussels, Belgium (2021), strengthening its presence at the heart of European sport and civil society.

EFPM is governed by a General Assembly, which meets annually, and an Executive Committee of nine voluntary members elected for four year terms. It collaborates with national fair play organisations, National Olympic Committees, European sports bodies, and educational institutions throughout Europe. In total +- 35 Olympic Committees or recognized organisations by the NOC as well as almost 20 European or International Sports Federations are seating at the General Assembly.

== Awards ==
EFPM presents several awards to highlight outstanding contributions to fair play and ethical values in sport. Awards are presented at the annual European Fair Play Movement Awards Ceremony in different categories:

- European Fair Play Plaque of Merit and Diploma made under the patronage of the European Olympic Committees
- European Fair Play Diploma made under the patronage of the European Olympic Committees
- EFPM ‘SPIRIT OF FAIR PLAY’ Award
- EFPM “FAIR PLAY VOX” Award, made under the auspices of AIPS EUROPE
- EFPM “Fair Play Flame” Award – for young people up to 18 years old
- Diploma of Recognition
- Fair Play for Peace Award — an international award recognising the role of sport in promoting peace and tolerance, with laureates such as the United Nations High Commissioner for Refugees and Special Olympics International.

These awards are presented at formal ceremonies, including the annual EFPM awards event, and honour individuals and organisations that exemplify the principles of fair play on and off the field.

== Presidents and honorary members ==
The Executive Committee is led by a president elected by the General Assembly.

- Fritz Wijk (NED) 1994 - 2001
- Carlos Gonçalves (POR) – 2001 - 2012
- Christian Hinterberger (AUT) –2012 - 2021
- Philippe Housiaux (BEL) – elected at the 26th General Assembly in Vienna in 2021

Over the years, the European Fair Play Movement has recognised distinguished figures in the european fair play community by granting them honorary positions or acknowledging their long‑standing contributions to sportsmanship and ethics. Notable individuals associated with honorary roles in the broader fair play context include:

- Ruggero Alcanterini (ITA)
- Erdogan Aripinar (TUR)
- Christian Blareau (FRA)
- André Catelin (FRA)
- OLY Miroslav Cerar (SLO)
- Gen. Lottas Charalambos (CYP)
- Georges Diderich (LUX)
- Francesco Gnecchi‑Ruscone (ITA)
- Prof. Dr. Carlos Gonçalves (POR)
- Christian Hinterberger (AUT)
- Prof. Dr. Manfred Lämmer (GER)
- Jean Presset (SUI)
- Vladimir Rodichenko (RUS)

== See also ==
- International Fair Play Committee

== Library ==
- Kajetan Hądzelek; Magdalena Rejf; Halina Zdebska-Biziewska; Ryszard Żukowski, eds. (2016). Fair Play. Warsaw: Polish Olympic Committee Fair Play Club. ISBN 978-83-65110-55-8.
