= 1937 Workers' Winter Olympiad =

5th International Workers' Olympiad

- Host city: Janské Lázně, Czechoslovakia
- Nations: 7
- Dates: 18 February 1937– 21 February 1937

The 1937 Workers' Winter Olympiad was the fifth edition of International Workers' Olympiads. The games were held from 18 to 21 February at the Czechoslovak town of Janské Lázně.

== Sports ==
- Alpine skiing
- Nordic skiing
- Figure skating

== Participating countries ==
- Czechoslovakia
- Denmark
- Finland
- France
- Hungary
- Norway
- Poland
- Switzerland

== Nordic skiing ==
=== Men's 15 km cross-country skiing ===
Place	Competitor	Time
1	(Finland) Nestor Partanen	47.58
2	(Finland) E. Karhu	48.06
3	(Finland) H. Kujala	48.28

=== Men's 30 km cross-country skiing ===
Place	Competitor	Time
1	(Norway) Hilmar Solli	2.04.04
2	(Norway) Berner Bendiksen	2.04.20
3	(Norway) Kristian Kristiansen	2.04.50

=== Men's patrol race ===
Place	Competitor	Time
1	Norway 1 Ivar Trehørningen; Peder Volden; Eilif Enlid	39.14
2	Norway 2 Kåre Henriksen; Arthur Jensen; Oskar Andresen	40.43
3	Finland	41.44

=== Women's 6 km cross-country skiing ===
Place	Competitor	Time
1	(Finland) Irma Ruokokoski	23.52
2	(Finland) Hilma Lahtinen	24.02
3	(Norway) Borghild Langseth Monsen	24.43

=== Women's patrol race ===
Place	Competitor	Time
1	Finland	?
2	Czechoslovakia 1	?
3	Czechoslovakia 2	?

=== Men's ski jumping ===
Place	Competitor	Points
1	(Norway) Trygve Martinsen	18.77
2	(Norway) Ingvar Iversen	17.66
3	(Norway) Egil Tokle	17.44

=== Men's Nordic combined ===
Place	Competitor	Points
1	(Norway) Arthur Jensen	37.438
2	(Norway) Hilmar Solli	37.117
3	(Norway) Peder Volden	31.750

== Alpine skiing ==
=== Men's downhill ===
Place	Competitor	Time
1	(Norway) Tormod Ruud	3.01.0
2	(Czechoslovakia) Jaroslaw	3.26.8
3	(Norway) Arne Taksrud	3.36.8

=== Men's slalom ===
Place	Competitor	Time
1	(Switzerland) Willi Albies	61.8
2	(Switzerland) Werner Schwaar	62.2
3	(Norway) Ingvar Iversen	64.0

=== Women's downhill ===
Place	Competitor	Time
1	(Norway) Borghild Langseth Monsen	4.42.0
2	(Finland) Irma Ruokokoski	6.15.6
3	(Finland) Aune Silvast	6.31.6

=== Women's slalom ===
Place	Competitor	Time
1	(Norway) Borghild Langseth Monsen	41.8
2	(Czechoslovakia) Hilde Dolensky	49.5
3	(Hungary) Caroline Ulwari	51.4

== Speed skating ==
The races were cancelled due to mild weather in Trautenau (Trutnov), where the races should have been held.

== Figure skating ==
??
