= Paavo Virtanen =

Finnish footballer (1915–1998)

Personal information
- Date of birth: 11 March 1915
- Date of death: 27 November 1998 (aged 83)
- Position: Outside forward

Senior career*
Years	Team	Apps	(Gls)
1934–1948	Helsingin Palloseura		

International career
1935–1937	Finland	3	(0)
- * Club domestic league appearances and goals

Paavo Valdemar Virtanen (11 March 1915 – 27 November 1998) was a Finnish footballer who played as an outside forward. He made three appearances for the Finland national team from 1935 to 1937. He was also part of Finland's team for their qualification matches for the 1938 FIFA World Cup. He played his whole career for Helsingin Palloseura. In Mestaruussarja he played 102 games and scored 18 goals. He was part of the squad that won Finnish football championship in 1934 but played only two games. In the 1935 championship winning team he was already a regular and played 12 out of 14 games scoring 5 goals.
