= 1925 Workers' Winter Olympiad =

- Host city: Schreiberhau, Germany
- Nations: 4
- Events: 6
- Dates: January 31, 1925– February 2, 1925

The 1925 Workers' Winter Olympiad was the first edition of International Workers' Olympiads. The games were held from January 31 to February 2 at the German town of Schreiberhau which today is a part of Poland and it is called Szklarska Poręba.

Four nations participated the 1925 Workers' Winter Olympiad. The only sport was Nordic skiing. Competitors did not represent their country but instead they were competing under the common red flag of the Workers' movement.

== Events and best placed competitors ==
=== Men's 15 km cross-country skiing ===
Place	Competitor	Time
1	(Finland) Elis Laine	59.23
2	(Finland) Gabriel Kammonen	59.34
3	(Finland) Toivo Kostiainen	1.01.14

=== Men's 30 km cross-country skiing ===
Place	Competitor	Time
1	(Finland) Albin Veijalainen	1.55.10
2	(Finland) Emil Halinen	1.55.28
3	(Finland) Elis Laine	1.57.07

=== Men's 4 km steeplechase skiing ===
Place	Competitor	Time
1	(Finland) Emil Elo	27.07
2	(Finland) Toivo Paavilainen	28.55
3	(Germany) Georg Bienert	29.33

=== Women's 6 km cross-country skiing ===
Place	Competitor	Time
1	(Austria) Grete Buchbinder	1.15.22
2	(Czechoslovakia) Adele Thomas	1.18.23
3	(Czechoslovakia) Irma Prade	1.23.40

=== Men's Nordic combined ===
Place	Competitor	Points
1	(Finland) Lauri Leppänen	44.500
2	(Austria) Alois Heils	35.700
3	(Finland) Toivo Paavilainen	20.000

=== Men's ski jumping ===
Place	Competitor	Points
1	(Austria) Adolf Puz	28.00
2	(Czechoslovakia) Ernts Langhammer	26.75
3	(Germany) Richard Reinwarth	24.50

== Country ranking ==
Participating nations are ranked by positions, since no medals were awarded at the Workers' Olympiads.

Rank	Country	1st place	2nd place	3rd place
1	Finland	4	3	3
2	Austria	2	1	0
3	Czechoslovakia	0	2	1
4	Germany	0	0	2

== Sources ==
- Voitto Raatikainen: "Talviurheilun sankarit – talviurheilun kuvahistoria", Karisto Publishing 1977. ISBN 9512311798
