= Polish Workers' Sport Federation =

Polish Workers' Sport Federation (Polish: Związek Robotniczych Stowarzyszeń Sportowych, ZRSS) was a sports federation in interbellum Poland, dominated by the Polish Socialist Party. ZRSS was affiliated to the Socialist Workers' Sport International.
