= Janské Lázně =

- Town
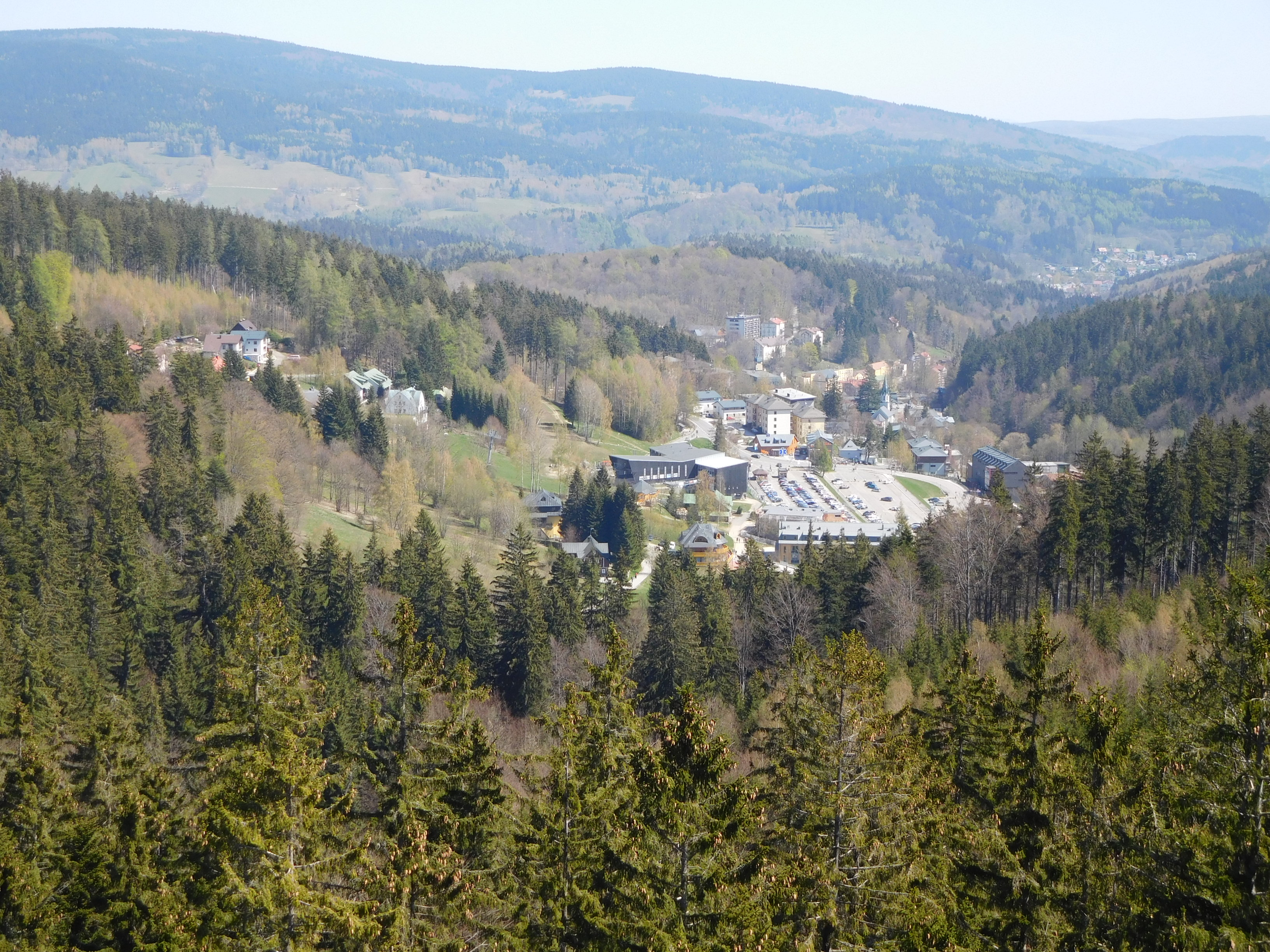
- View from the west

- Flag Coat of arms

- Location in the Czech Republic
- Coordinates: 50°37′45″N 15°46′43″E
- Country: Czech Republic
- Region: Hradec Králové
- District: Trutnov
- First mentioned: 1552

Government
  - Mayor: Martin Hudrlík

Area
  - Total: 13.73 km^{2} (5.30 sq mi)
- Elevation: 519 m (1,703 ft)

Population (2026-01-01)
  - Total: 647
  - Density: 47.1/km^{2} (122/sq mi)
- Time zone: UTC+1 (CET)
  - Summer (DST): UTC+2 (CEST)
- Postal code: 542 25
- Website: janske-lazne.cz

Janské Lázně (Czech pronunciation: [ˈjanskɛː ˈlaːzɲɛ]; German: Johannisbad) is a spa town in Trutnov District in the Hradec Králové Region of the Czech Republic. It has about 600 inhabitants. It lies in the Giant Mountains and in addition to the spa, it is known as a centre of winter sports.

== Etymology ==
The name literally means "Jan's spa" in Czech. The town was named after Jan of Chockov, who discovered here a hot spring.

== Geography ==
Janské Lázně is located about 11 kilometres (7 mi) northwest of Trutnov and 46 km (29 mi) north of Hradec Králové. It lies in the Giant Mountains, and its northern part lies within the Krkonoše National Park. The highest point is the mountain Černá hora at 1,299 m (4,262 ft) above sea level. The stream Janský potok originates here and flows through the municipal territory.

== History ==
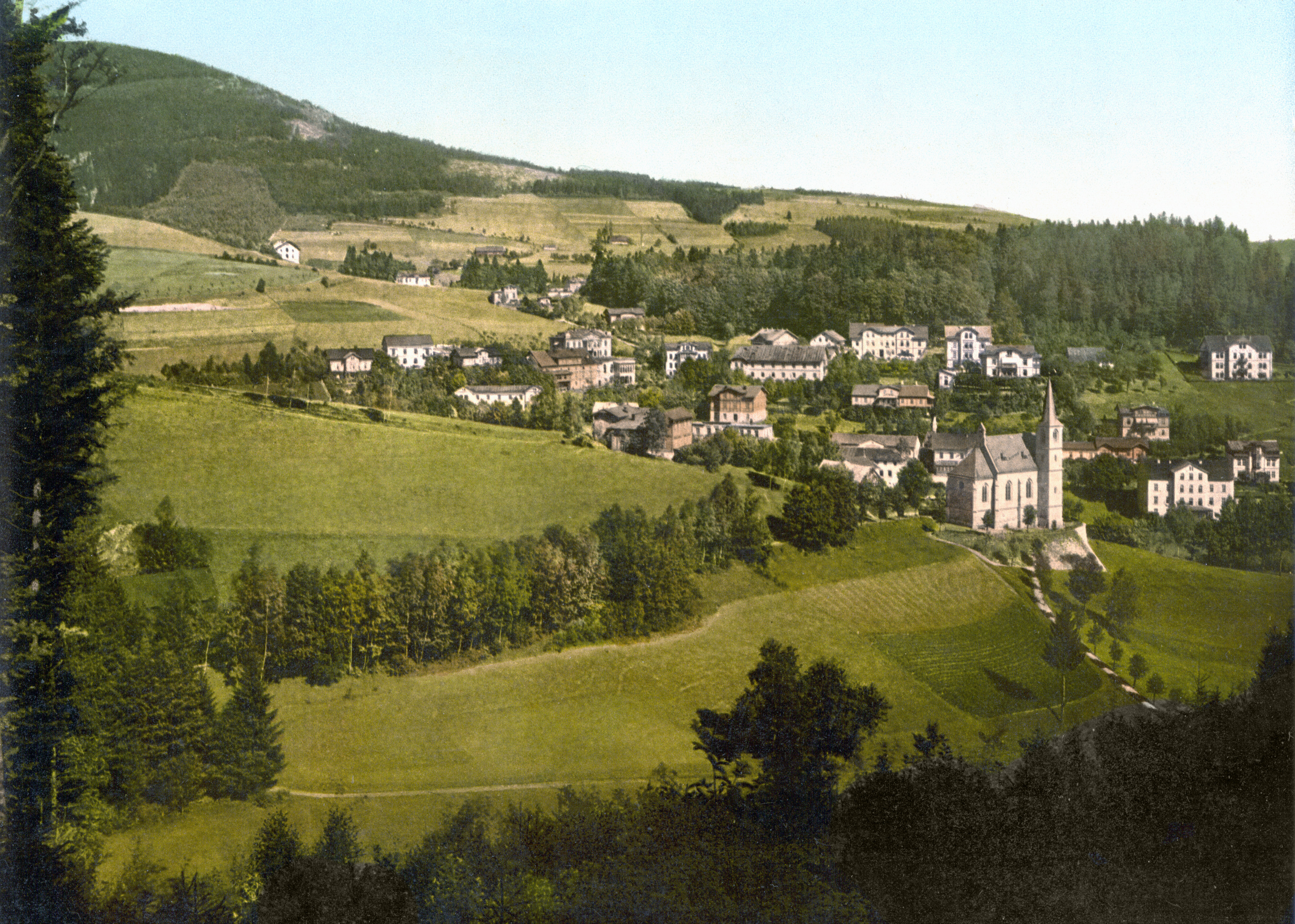
The town in around 1900

According to the chronicle of Simon Hüttel, a hot spring was discovered here on 6 June 1006 by Jan of Chockov, after whom the town was later named. The hot water was originally used to drive the water wheel, which activated the hammer mill. The first records of using the thermal spring for bathing is from the 14th century. In 1485, an accommodation house was built next to the spring. During 1675–1680, a village was founded here by order of Johann Adolf of Schwarzenberg. In 1881, it was promoted to a market town. In 1902, the spa was bought by the municipality. Janské Lázně was promoted to a town in 1965.

In 1928, the first funicular from Janské Lázně to the Černá hora Mountain was built. In 1980, the old funicular to Černá hora was replaced by a new one with a different route.

== Demographics ==
Historical population

Year	Pop.	±%
1869	406	—
1880	477	+17.5%
1890	518	+8.6%
1900	492	−5.0%
1910	478	−2.8%

Year	Pop.	±%
1921	540	+13.0%
1930	679	+25.7%
1950	2,600	+282.9%
1961	817	−68.6%
1970	745	−8.8%

Year	Pop.	±%
1980	997	+33.8%
1991	961	−3.6%
2001	917	−4.6%
2011	786	−14.3%
2021	656	−16.5%

Source: Censuses

== Economy ==
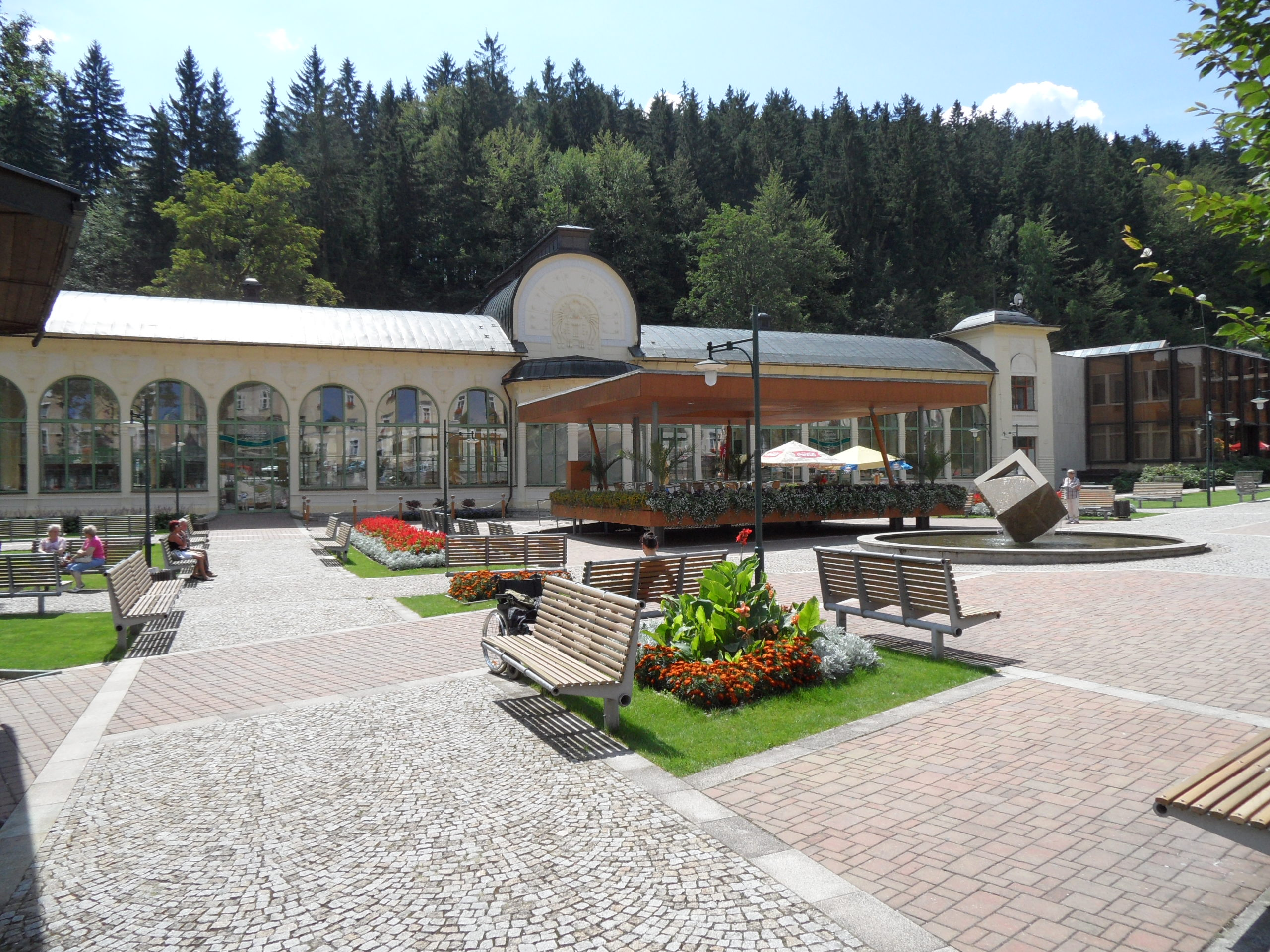
Spa colonnade

The largest employer in Janské Lázně is the spa. The spa is focused mainly of treatment of musculoskeletal disorders. The water bath runs at a natural temperature of 27 °C (81 °F).

== Transport ==
There are no railways or major roads passing through the municipal territory.

Janské Lázně and the top of the Černá hora mountain are connected by a cable car.

== Sport ==
Janské Lázně is known for its ski resort and have a reputation of both summer and winter sports centre. It was host of the 1925 FIS Nordic World Ski Championships and 1937 Workers' Winter Olympiad.

== Sights ==
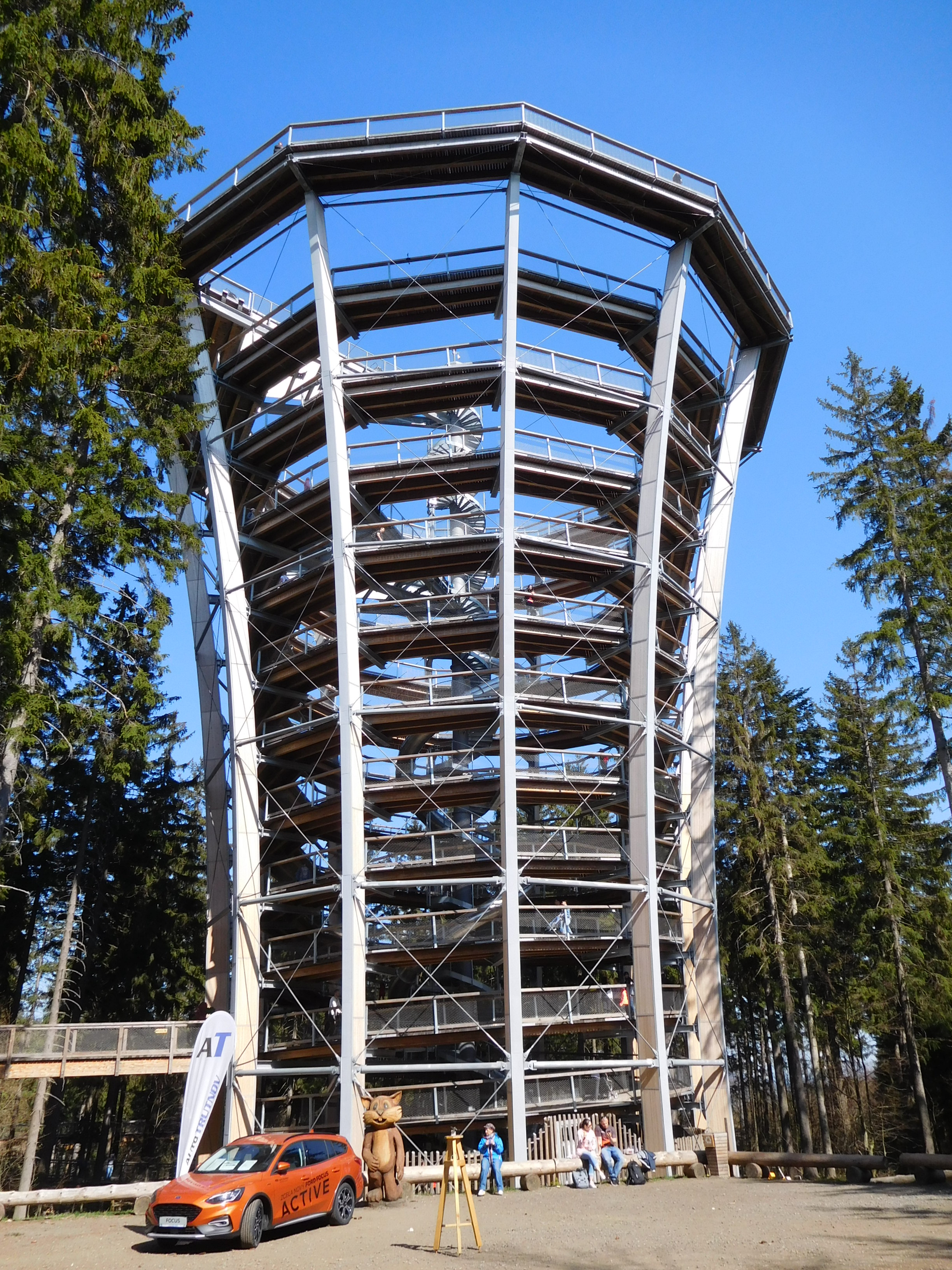
Krkonoše Tree Top Trail

The Art Nouveau colonnade built in 1904 is the most popular sight in the town. There is also the Krakonoš statue from 1906.

The Church of Saint John the Baptist was built in the neo-Gothic style in the 1880s.

To the west of the town, there is the Krkonoše Tree Top Trail, a frequent tourist destination. It is an educational trail with a total length of over 1,500 m (4,900 ft). It is formed by a 45 m (148 ft) high tower.

== Twin towns – sister cities ==
Janské Lázně is twinned with:

- Polanica-Zdrój, Poland
