= Arbeiter-Turn- und Sportbund =

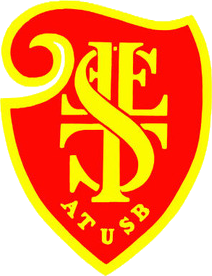
Logo

The Arbeiter-Turn- und Sportbund (ATSB or Workers' Gymnastics and Sports Federation) was a national German sports organization active between 1893 and 1933. The organization actively promoted leftist political views built around class struggle and nationalism.

Sport in late 19th century Germany was centered on the development of gymnastics and was highly politicized with strong nationalist overtones. A clear class divide developed and often workers were not accepted within the ranks of established sports clubs. In response, separate worker's clubs emerged and in 1893 the Workers' Gymnastics Federation (ATB or Arbeiter Turnerbund) was formed in Gera. In June 1919, following World War I, the federation was renamed Arbeiter-Turn- und Sportbund to reflect the rise of sports other than gymnastics including athletics, handball, and especially football.

In the late 1920s the federation had a membership of 770,000 and fielded over 8,000 football teams throughout Germany. Between 1920 and 1932, the ATSB staged its own national football championship separate from that of the DFB (Deutscher Fußball Bund, en:German Football Association). It also held German Workers' Gymnastics and Sports Festival and hosted or took part in international events including the Workers' Olympiad.

By 1930, the federation had a membership of 1.2 million, however, it splintered when the communist-oriented Kampfgemeinschaft für Rote Sporteinheit (KG, en:Fighting Community for Red Sport, commonly Rotsport) was formed. Despite its popularity, the ATSB never managed to break the dominance of bourgeois clubs within the working class.

After the rise to power of the Nazis in 1933, all sports associations with left-leaning or faith-based affiliations were disbanded. The memberships of these clubs were dispersed or forced into mergers with sides more ideologically palatable to the regime and the clubs' assets were expropriated. The KG was broken up in February 1933, followed by the ATSB in May.

== See also ==
- Nationalsozialistischer Reichsbund für Leibesübungen
- Category:German workers' football clubs
