= Spartakiad =

Recurring international sports event sponsored by the Soviet Union (1928–1937)

- "The Red Sport International defends the Soviet Union": Poster of the 2nd International Spartakiad of the Red Sport International (Berlin, 1931)
- Status: Defunct
- Genre: Multi-sport event
- Frequency: 5 times in the time active
- Years active: 1928–1937
- Organiser: Red Sport International

The Spartakiad (or Spartakiade) was an international sports event that was sponsored by the Soviet Union. Five international Spartakiades were held from 1928 to 1937. Later Spartakiads were organized as national sport events of the Eastern Bloc countries. The games were organised by Red Sport International.

== Background ==
The Soviet Union attempted to use Spartakiads to both oppose and supplement the Olympics. In Russian, there is a certain parallelism in the names: "Spartakiada" and "Olimpiada". The name, derived from the name of the slave rebel leader, Spartacus, was intended to symbolize proletarian internationalism. As a classical figure, Spartacus also stood directly in contrast to the aristocratic nature of the Ancient Olympic Games on which the modern "capitalist" Olympics were based. The first Winter Spartakiad was held in February 1928 in Oslo, and the first Summer Spartakiad was held in August 1928 in Moscow.

The first Spartakiads in the Soviet Union took place in 1923 within formations of the Red Army and the Spartak Physical Culture organization in Petrograd. The Moscow Spartakiad in 1928 was also known as the All-Union Spartakiad. From the start of the 1930s in the Soviet Union, spartakiads of trade unions and the Dynamo physical culture sports society took place. In the 1950s, spartakiads of the Peoples DOSAAF of the Soviet Union, all-Union Spartakiads of students, international Spartakiads of "friendly armies of Socialist and developing countries", and others were introduced.

== List of Spartakiads ==
Summer

- 1928 – Moscow
- 1931 – Berlin

Winter

- 1928 – Oslo
- 1936 – Oslo

== After World War II ==
=== Soviet Union ===
In 1952, the Soviet Union decided to join the Olympic movement, and international Spartakiads ceased, but the term continued to exist for internal sports events in the Soviet Union of different levels, from local up to the Spartakiad of the Peoples of the USSR (Russian: Спартакиада народов СССР, romanized: Spartakiada narodov SSSR). The latter event was held twice in four years: Winter Spartakiad and Summer Spartakiad.

The first Soviet Spartakiad was held in 1956. According to the Great Soviet Encyclopedia, the number of participants in the 6th Summer Spartakiad of the Peoples of the USSR was 90 million people (twice the number of athletes in the USSR in that time), including 8,300 Masters of Sports of the USSR, and 20 million in the 3rd Winter Spartakiad of the Peoples of the USSR, including some 1,000 Masters of Sports of the USSR. These numbers however have been frequently called into question due to the low reliability and ideological bias of the Great Soviet Encyclopedia. The Winter and Summer Spartakiads of the Peoples of the USSR were each commemorated on a series of postage stamps, released in millions of copies. Until 1975, all summer finals were held in Moscow, later in other cities throughout the Soviet Union (though most events were still held in Moscow). The winter editions' finals were often held in Sverdlovsk.

=== Czechoslovakia ===
The name Spartakiáda was also used for a mass gymnastics display, which was held every five years at the Strahov Stadium in Prague, Czechoslovakia. The first event of this name was held, however, already in 1921, and its initiator Jiří František Chaloupecký is credited as the inventor of the name.

=== Albania ===
Six similar events were held in Albania during communist rule as well (in 1959, 1969, 1974, 1979, 1984, and 1989).

=== Other ===
In 1984, the Soviet Union organised the Friendship Games, aimed at countries which boycotted the 1984 Summer Olympics.

== See also ==
- Spartakiad of the Peoples of the USSR
- Spartakiad (Czechoslovakia)
- Red Sport International
- International Workers' Olympiads
- People's Olympiad (1936), a planned sport event in Barcelona organized by Republican Spain for their boycott of the 1936 Summer Olympics being held in Nazi Germany
- Daciad – national sporting event in communist Romania
- National Games of China
- Vietnam National Games
- Olympic Games
- GANEFO
- International Army Games
- 2024 World Friendship Games
