= 2026–27 Premier League Cup =

Tournament details
- Country: England; Wales
- Teams: 40

Tournament statistics
- Matches played: 84
- Goals scored: 303 (3.61 per match)
- Attendance: 13,115 (156 per match)
- Top goal scorer(s): (England) Ellis McMillan (Charlton Athletic) (7 Goals)
- All statistics correct as of 21 November 2026.

The 2026–27 Premier League Cup is the thirteenth edition of the competition. A new format for 2026/27 was made for the competition, with 40 teams divided into 10 groups of four. Each side plays the other three teams home and away, with the 10 group winners and six best runners-up advancing to the Round of 16. This is 8 clubs more than last time after contracting back to 32 last season. 4 academies that participated last season did not return this year. Last year's runners up and inaugural participant Sunderland did not return after 12 consecutive seasons in the competition, Colchester United after 10 consecutive seasons, Watford did not return after 2 consecutive seasons, and finally Leyton Orient did not return after playing last year. In terms of teams returning to the competition, 10 teams came back. Bolton Wanderers and Gillingham return for the first time since the competition was a knockout only in 2015–16, West Ham United returns after a 5 season absence, Plymouth Argyle is returning for the after a 4 year absence since 2022–23, Newcastle United and Peterborough United returned after a 2 year absence, and Brighton & Hove Albion, Fleetwood Town, Huddersfield Town, Leeds United, and Southampton returned after missing last year's competition. Wycombe Wanderers is participating in the competition for the very first time.

== Participants ==
=== Category 1 ===
- AFC Bournemouth
- Blackburn Rovers
- Birmingham City
- Brighton & Hove Albion
- Brentford
- Burnley
- Derby County
- Ipswich Town
- Leeds United
- Leicester City
- Newcastle United
- Norwich City
- Nottingham Forest
- Reading
- Southampton
- Stoke City
- West Bromwich Albion
- West Ham United
- Wolverhampton Wanderers

=== Category 2 ===
- Bolton Wanderers
- Bristol City
- Cardiff City
- Charlton Athletic
- Coventry City
- Fleetwood Town
- Huddersfield Town
- Hull City
- Millwall
- Peterborough United
- Queens Park Rangers
- Sheffield United
- Swansea City

=== Category 3 ===
- Exeter City
- Gillingham
- Luton Town
- Plymouth Argyle
- Preston North End
- Stockport County

=== Category 4 ===
- Bromley
- Wycombe Wanderers

== Group stage ==
=== Group A ===
Team	Pld	W	D	L	GF	GA	GD	Pts
Blackburn Rovers	5	3	1	1	11	10	+1	10
Southampton	4	2	1	1	11	4	+7	7
Queens Park Rangers	5	2	0	3	11	12	−1	6
Bolton Wanderers	4	0	2	2	5	12	−7	2

Updated to match(es) played on 20 November 2026. Source:

14 August 2026	Queens Park Rangers	4–1	Bolton Wanderers	Shepherd's Bush
19:00 BST	Obikwu 29'; Neill 57'; Sutton 59', 90+2'	Report	Clement 82'	Stadium: MATRADE Loftus Road; Attendance: 302; Referee: Matthew Norton

14 August 2026	Southampton	4–0	Blackburn Rovers	Eastleigh
19:00 BST	Ehibhatiomhan 11', 32', 42'; Sillah Dibaga 57'	Report		Stadium: Silverlake Stadium; Attendance: 246; Referee: Ben Atkinson

4 September 2026	Bolton Wanderers	1–1	Southampton	Horwich
19:00 BST	Watson 57'	Report	Gathercole 79'	Stadium: Toughsheet Community Stadium; Attendance: 127; Referee: Declan Brown

9 September 2026	Blackburn Rovers	4–2	Queens Park Rangers	Leyland
19:00 BST	Houghton 26'; Higgins 41'; Lister 75'; Sergeant 90'	Report	O'Brien 53'; Oluwabusola 87'	Stadium: Lancashire FA County Ground; Referee: Gareth Thomas

9 October 2026	Southampton	5–1	Queens Park Rangers	Eastleigh
19:00 BST	Ehibhatiomhan 17', 27'; Sillah Dibaga 22', 48'; Daley 56'	Report	Sanghrajka 6'	Stadium: Silverlake Stadium; Attendance: 138; Referee: Richie Watkins

12 October 2026	Blackburn Rovers	3–3	Bolton Wanderers	Leyland
19:00 BST	Lister 8'; Sergeant 23', 35'	Report	McAtee 13'; Ritchie 29'; King 75'	Stadium: Lancashire FA County Ground; Attendance: 269; Referee: Niall Smith

30 October 2026	Blackburn Rovers	2–1	Southampton	Blackburn
19:00 GMT	Ball 5' (pen.); Edmondson 73'	Report	Ehibhatiomhan 41'	Stadium: Ewood Park; Attendance: 274; Referee: Matthew Langdon

2 November 2026	Bolton Wanderers	0–4	Queens Park Rangers	Horwich
19:00 GMT		Report	Sanghrajka 6'; Wright 55'; Hassan 57', 63'	Stadium: Toughsheet Community Stadium; Referee: Robert Massey-Ellis

20 November 2026	Queens Park Rangers	0–2	Blackburn Rovers	Hayes
19:00 GMT		Report	McCoy 6', 61'	Stadium: SKYex Community Stadium; Referee: Redmond Egan

24 November 2026	Queens Park Rangers	v	Southampton	Hayes
19:00 GMT				Stadium: SKYex Community Stadium

4 December 2026	Southampton	v	Bolton Wanderers	Eastleigh
19:00 GMT				Stadium: Silverlake Stadium

8 December 2026	Bolton Wanderers	v	Blackburn Rovers	Horwich
19:00 GMT				Stadium: Toughsheet Community Stadium

=== Group B ===
Team	Pld	W	D	L	GF	GA	GD	Pts
Leicester City	4	3	0	1	8	3	+5	9
AFC Bournemouth	4	3	0	1	11	7	+4	9
Cardiff City	5	3	0	2	13	10	+3	9
Plymouth Argyle (E)	5	0	0	5	5	17	−12	0

Updated to match(es) played on 20 November 2026. Source:
(E) Eliminated

14 August 2026	Cardiff City	4–1	AFC Bournemouth	Leckwith
19:00 BST	Sykes 9'; Tankiewicz 59'; Perrett 72', 81'	Report	Day 48'	Stadium: Leckwith Stadium; Attendance: 150; Referee: William Davis

14 August 2026	Leicester City	3–1	Plymouth Argyle	Seagrave
19:00 BST	de Lisle 36'; Golding 45+2'; Hayman 67' (o.g.)	Report	Roberts 10'	Stadium: Leicester City Training Ground; Attendance: 106; Referee: Michael Barlow

4 September 2026	Leicester City	0–1	AFC Bournemouth	Seagrave
19:00 BST		Report	Sills 70'	Stadium: Leicester City Training Ground; Attendance: 163; Referee: Jonathan Maskrey

7 September 2026	Plymouth Argyle	2–3	Cardiff City	Plymouth
19:00 BST	Oseni 43'; Sandhu 90+7'	Report	I. Davies 56'; Perrett 63'; J. Davies 64'	Stadium: Home Park; Attendance: 575; Referee: Jamie Durkin

9 October 2026	Cardiff City	1–3	Leicester City	Leckwith
19:00 BST	J. Davies 6'	Report	Hutchinson 24' (pen.); Corden 69', 72'	Stadium: Leckwith Stadium; Attendance: 80; Referee: Greg Rollason

12 October 2026	AFC Bournemouth	6–1	Plymouth Argyle	Wimborne
19:00 BST	Nyarko 25', 54', 57', 72'; Chubinidze 33'; Waite 84'	Report	Maund 22' (pen.)	Stadium: The Wyatt Homes Stadium; Attendance: 269; Referee: Tolu Sangowawa

2 November 2026	AFC Bournemouth	3–2	Cardiff City	Wimborne
19:00 GMT	Dacosta 28', 31'; Jebbison 63'	Report	Hilaire-Clarke 45+2'; Williams 88'	Stadium: The Wyatt Homes Stadium; Attendance: 444; Referee: Paul Johnson

16 November 2026	Plymouth Argyle	0–2	Leicester City	Plymouth
19:00 GMT		Report	Ali 13'; Anugo 38'	Stadium: Home Park; Attendance: 252; Referee: Sunny Sukhvir Gill

20 November 2026	Cardiff City	3–1	Plymouth Argyle	Leckwith
19:00 GMT	Robinson 60'; Allmark 89'; Ola 90+3' (pen.)	Report	Tolcher 86'	Stadium: Leckwith Stadium; Referee: James Durkin

23 November 2026	AFC Bournemouth	v	Leicester City	Wimborne
19:00 GMT				Stadium: The Wyatt Homes Stadium

4 December 2026	Leicester City	v	Cardiff City	Seagrave
19:00 GMT				Stadium: Leicester City Training Ground

7 December 2026	Plymouth Argyle	v	AFC Bournemouth	Plymouth
19:00 GMT				Stadium: Home Park

=== Group C ===
Team	Pld	W	D	L	GF	GA	GD	Pts
Swansea City	4	3	1	0	11	2	+9	10
Huddersfield Town	4	2	2	0	11	6	+5	8
Birmingham City	4	1	0	3	6	10	−4	3
Gillingham (E)	4	0	1	3	2	12	−10	1

Updated to match(es) played on 17 November 2026. Source:
(E) Eliminated

14 August 2026	Swansea City	3–0	Birmingham City	Landore
19:00 BST	Davies 29'; Bianchini 45+5'; Woodward 78'	Report		Stadium: Landore Training Centre; Attendance: 93; Referee: Sam Mulhall

18 August 2026	Huddersfield Town	4–1	Gillingham	Huddersfield
19:00 BST	Sebine 4', 54'; Spencer 21'; Smith-Sway 43'	Report	Webster 90+2'	Stadium: Accu Stadium; Attendance: 240; Referee: Liam Smith

7 September 2026	Swansea City	2–2	Huddersfield Town	Landore
19:00 BST	Woodward 52'; Lloyd 57'	Report	Ashia 45+1'; Fontoh 85'	Stadium: Landore Training Centre; Attendance: 115; Referee: Matthew Scholes

15 September 2026	Gillingham	0–4	Birmingham City	Gillingham
19:00 BST		Report	Ugorji 37'; Quirk 55'; Burrell 64'; Bamba 90+1'	Stadium: Priestfield Stadium; Attendance: 389; Referee: Isaac Seale

9 October 2026	Birmingham City	2–4	Huddersfield Town	Solihull
19:00 BST	Elmansuri 19', 37'	Report	Ashia 7'; Spencer 46'; Fontoh 56'; Amissah 74'	Stadium: Damson Park; Referee: Matthew McQuillan

30 October 2026	Birmingham City	0–3	Swansea City	Stratford upon Avon
19:00 GMT		Report	Lloyd 57', 61'; Woodward 80'	Stadium: The Arden Garages Stadium; Attendance: 50; Referee: Jamie O'Connor

3 November 2026	Gillingham	1–1	Huddersfield Town	Gillingham
19:00 GMT	Whitelock 22'	Report	Ebanks‑Blake 15'	Stadium: Priestfield Stadium; Attendance: 285; Referee: Callum Wallchester

17 November 2026	Swansea City	3–0	Gillingham	Landore
19:00 GMT	Lloyd 57'; Rees-Siso 74'; Griffith 78'	Report		Stadium: Landore Training Centre; Attendance: 61; Referee: Richie Watkins

23 November 2026	Birmingham City	v	Gillingham	Solihull
19:00 GMT				Stadium: Damson Park

24 November 2026	Huddersfield Town	v	Swansea City	Huddersfield
19:00 GMT				Stadium: Accu Stadium

7 December 2026	Huddersfield Town	v	Birmingham City	Huddersfield
19:00 GMT				Stadium: Accu Stadium

8 December 2026	Gillingham	v	Swansea City	Gillingham
19:00 GMT				Stadium: Priestfield Stadium

=== Group D ===
Team	Pld	W	D	L	GF	GA	GD	Pts
Newcastle United (Q)	5	4	0	1	12	6	+6	12
Nottingham Forest	5	3	0	2	14	9	+5	9
Peterborough United	4	2	0	2	6	7	−1	6
Luton Town (E)	4	0	0	4	3	13	−10	0

Updated to match(es) played on 18 November 2026. Source:
(E) Eliminated; (Q) Qualified for the phase indicated

14 August 2026	Nottingham Forest	2–0	Luton Town	Loughborough
19:00 BST	Smith 9'; Blake 64'	Report		Stadium: Loughborough University Stadium; Attendance: 132; Referee: Charles King

7 September 2026	Luton Town	0–4	Peterborough United	Luton
19:00 BST		Report	Ormerod 41'; Sykut 50'; Simmons 64'; Abbey 82'	Stadium: Kenilworth Road; Attendance: 235; Referee: Paul Johnson

9 October 2026	Newcastle United	4–1	Luton Town	Newcastle upon Tyne
19:00 BST	Crace 25' (o.g.); Johnson 52'; Cá 77', 82'	Report	Lorentzen-Jones 88'	Stadium: Whitley Park; Attendance: 257; Referee: Ethan Murray

9 October 2026	Peterborough United	1–5	Nottingham Forest	Peterborough
19:00 BST	Abbey 66'	Report	McDonnell 4'; Powell 29'; Broomes 40'; Nolan 52', 83'	Stadium: Weston Homes Stadium; Attendance: 126; Referee: Kirsty Dowle

30 October 2026	Luton Town	2–3	Nottingham Forest	Enfield
19:00 GMT	Crace 76'; Gawel 90'	Report	Whitehall 48'; Smith 71', 90+3'	Stadium: Queen Elizabeth II Stadium; Attendance: 206; Referee: Aaron Farmer

30 October 2026	Newcastle United	2–0	Peterborough United	Newcastle upon Tyne
19:00 GMT	Emerson 51'; Koussou 64'	Report		Stadium: Whitley Park; Attendance: 270; Referee: Kavan Hurn

13 November 2026	Peterborough United	1–0	Newcastle United	Peterborough
19:00 GMT	Ormerod 37' (pen.)	Report		Stadium: Weston Homes Stadium; Attendance: 250; Referee: Aaron Farmer

18 November 2026	Nottingham Forest	2–3	Newcastle United	Loughborough
19:00 GMT	Smith 45+1'; Tomak 75'	Report	Seldon 33'; Wooster 43'; Watts 64'	Stadium: Loughborough University Stadium; Attendance: 206; Referee: Samuel Bragg

22 November 2026	Peterborough United	v	Luton Town	Peterborough
13:00 GMT				Stadium: Weston Homes Stadium

23 November 2026	Newcastle United	v	Nottingham Forest	Newcastle upon Tyne
19:00 GMT				Stadium: Whitley Park

4 December 2026	Nottingham Forest	v	Peterborough United	Loughborough
19:00 GMT				Stadium: Loughborough University Stadium

7 December 2026	Luton Town	v	Newcastle United	Luton
19:00 GMT				Stadium: Kenilworth Road

=== Group E ===
Team	Pld	W	D	L	GF	GA	GD	Pts
Wolverhampton Wanderers	3	2	1	0	4	1	+3	7
Preston North End	4	2	1	1	5	4	+1	7
Fleetwood Town	5	1	1	3	7	7	0	4
Burnley	4	1	1	2	5	9	−4	4

Updated to match(es) played on 20 November 2026. Source:

14 August 2026	Wolverhampton Wanderers	2–0	Burnley	Wellington
19:00 BST	McLeod 30', 40'	Report		Stadium: SEAH Stadium; Attendance: 105; Referee: Richard Aspinall

18 August 2026	Fleetwood Town	1–2	Preston North End	Fleetwood
19:00 BST	Oladiti 12'	Report	Stringfellow 7'; Wilson 39'	Stadium: Highbury Stadium; Attendance: 217; Referee: Stuart Morland

2 September 2026	Preston North End	0–1	Wolverhampton Wanderers	Chorley
19:00 BST		Report	González 64'	Stadium: Victory Park; Referee: Aaron Jackson

8 September 2026	Fleetwood Town	1–2	Burnley	Fleetwood
19:00 BST	Animasaun 54'	Report	Johnson 45'; Okonkwo 50'	Stadium: Highbury Stadium; Referee: Michael Barlow

9 October 2026	Burnley	2–2	Preston North End	Leyland
19:00 BST	Castell 22'; Pouani 48'	Report	Reid 27'; Snowball 50'	Stadium: Lancashire FA County Ground; Attendance: 154; Referee: Dean Watson

9 October 2026	Wolverhampton Wanderers	1–1	Fleetwood Town	Kidderminster
19:00 BST	González 77'	Report	Kelly 84'	Stadium: Aggborough; Attendance: 159; Referee: Steven Copeland

2 November 2026	Preston North End	1–0	Fleetwood Town	Chorley
19:00 GMT	Irwin 39'	Report		Stadium: Victory Park; Attendance: 315; Referee: Jonathan Chadwick

20 November 2026	Burnley	1–4	Fleetwood Town	Leyland
19:00 GMT	Bauress 9'	Report	Sawkins 28'; Stansfield 58'; Costelloe 60' (pen.); Animasaun 83'	Stadium: Lancashire FA County Ground; Referee: Ethan Murray

23 November 2026	Wolverhampton Wanderers	v	Preston North End	Kidderminster
19:00 GMT				Stadium: Aggborough

26 November 2026	Burnley	v	Wolverhampton Wanderers	Leyland
19:00 GMT				Stadium: Lancashire FA County Ground

7 December 2026	Fleetwood Town	v	Wolverhampton Wanderers	Clitheroe
19:00 GMT				Stadium: The Loom Loft Stadium

7 December 2026	Preston North End	v	Burnley	Chorley
19:00 GMT				Stadium: Victory Park

=== Group F ===
Team	Pld	W	D	L	GF	GA	GD	Pts
Brighton & Hove Albion (Q)	4	3	1	0	8	3	+5	10
Sheffield United	4	3	0	1	8	5	+3	9
Millwall	4	1	0	3	3	7	−4	3
West Ham United (E)	4	0	1	3	3	7	−4	1

Updated to match(es) played on 13 November 2026. Source:
(E) Eliminated; (Q) Qualified for the phase indicated

14 August 2026	Brighton & Hove Albion	2–0	Millwall	Lancing
19:00 BST	Munday 9'; Ibrahim 82'	Report		Stadium: The American Express Elite Performance Centre; Attendance: 108; Referee: Adam Merchant

25 August 2026	Sheffield United	3–1	West Ham United	York
19:00 BST	Eadie 39'; Blacker 49'; Reid 53'	Report	Cummings 69'	Stadium: LNER Community Stadium; Attendance: 81; Referee: Andrew Miller

4 September 2026	West Ham United	1–1	Brighton & Hove Albion	Romford
19:00 BST	Medine 86'	Report	Silsby 18'	Stadium: Rush Green Stadium; Attendance: 225; Referee: Jason Richardson

9 October 2026	Brighton & Hove Albion	2–1	Sheffield United	Lancing
19:00 BST	Joseph 13'; Silsby 54'	Report	Blacker 51'	Stadium: The American Express Elite Performance Centre; Referee: Chay Hathway

9 October 2026	Millwall	1–0	West Ham United	New Cross Gate
19:00 BST	Howland 64'	Report		Stadium: The Den; Attendance: 540; Referee: Sam Mulhall

30 October 2026	West Ham United	1–2	Sheffield United	Romford
19:00 GMT	Dike 82'	Report	Reid 40'; Blacker 70'	Stadium: Rush Green Stadium; Attendance: 106; Referee: Alan Dale

10 November 2026	Millwall	1–3	Brighton & Hove Albion	New Cross Gate
19:00 GMT	Ndige 70'	Report	Munday 64'; Silsby 75', 86'	Stadium: The Den; Referee: Aji Ajibola

13 November 2026	Millwall	1–2	Sheffield United	New Cross Gate
19:00 GMT	Ivanović 66'	Report	Okyere 26'; Leon 45+1' (pen.)	Stadium: The Den; Attendance: 193; Referee: Matthew Norton
Note: match was originally going to be played 8 September but was moved to 20 October 2026 and then to 13 November 2026.

23 November 2026	Brighton & Hove Albion	v	West Ham United	Lancing
19:00 GMT				Stadium: American Express Elite Performance Centre

24 November 2026	Sheffield United	v	Millwall	York
19:00 GMT				Stadium: LNER Community Stadium

4 December 2026	West Ham United	v	Millwall	Romford
19:00 GMT				Stadium: Rush Green Stadium

7 December 2026	Sheffield United	v	Brighton & Hove Albion	York
19:00 GMT				Stadium: LNER Community Stadium

=== Group G ===
Team	Pld	W	D	L	GF	GA	GD	Pts
Norwich City (Q)	5	4	1	0	13	6	+7	13
Bristol City	5	2	1	2	12	10	+2	7
Exeter City	4	2	0	2	10	12	−2	6
Reading (E)	4	0	0	4	6	13	−7	0

Updated to match(es) played on 20 November 2026. Source:
(E) Eliminated; (Q) Qualified for the phase indicated

11 August 2026	Bristol City	4–0	Reading	Failand
20:00 BST	Yeboah 36'; Skinner 56'; Knight 81'; O'Neill 90+1'	Report		Stadium: Robins High Performance Centre; Attendance: 116; Referee: Robert Massey-Ellis

7 September 2026	Reading	1–2	Bristol City	Farnborough
19:00 BST	Lonmeni 81'	Report	Naylor 36' (pen.); Morrison 52'	Stadium: Saunders Transport Community Stadium; Attendance: 112; Referee: Will Briers

28 September 2026	Exeter City	1–3	Norwich City	Exeter
19:00 BST	Appleton 90+1'	Report	Myles 6'; Cooper 27'; Corke 79'	Stadium: St James Park; Attendance: 206; Referee: Richard Eley

9 October 2026	Reading	2–3	Norwich City	Farnborough
19:00 BST	Barough 8'; Dashi 86'	Report	Corke 4'; Myles 63'; Rowley 78' (o.g.)	Stadium: Saunders Transport Community Stadium; Attendance: 117; Referee: Callum Fisk

12 October 2026	Bristol City	3–5	Exeter City	Failand
19:00 BST	Naylor 31'; O'Neill 34'; Yeboah 55'	Report	Cox 22', 45+4', 48'; Turns 41'; Grant 83'	Stadium: Robins High Performance Centre; Attendance: 200; Referee: Richard Aspinall

21 October 2026	Norwich City	1–1	Bristol City	Colney
19:00 BST	Chilvers 71'	Report	Thelwell 1'	Stadium: Avant Training Centre; Referee: Aji Ajibola

2 November 2026	Exeter City	4–3	Reading	Exeter
19:00 GMT	Sutherland 43', 55' (pen.); Matthews 45+2'; Williams 88'	Report	Patton 18', 32'; Jones 75'	Stadium: St James Park; Attendance: 250; Referee: Elliott Swallow

16 November 2026	Norwich City	3–0	Exeter City	Colney
19:00 GMT	Ameen 46'; Towler 53', 57'	Report		Stadium: Avant Training Centre; Referee: Daniel Blades
Note: The match was originally going to be played on 30 October but was moved to 16 November 2026.

20 November 2026	Bristol City	2–3	Norwich City	Failand
19:00 GMT	Young 23'; Knight 34'		Myles 51'; Corke 81'; Ameen 89'	Stadium: Robins High Performance Centre; Referee: Niall Smith

23 November 2026	Reading	v	Exeter City	Farnborough
19:00 GMT				Stadium: Saunders Transport Community Stadium

4 December 2026	Norwich City	v	Reading	Colney
19:00 GMT				Stadium: Avant Training Centre

7 December 2026	Exeter City	v	Bristol City	Exeter
19:00 GMT				Stadium: St James Park

=== Group H ===
Team	Pld	W	D	L	GF	GA	GD	Pts
Coventry City	5	3	0	2	8	8	0	9
West Bromwich Albion	5	2	1	2	9	9	0	7
Bromley	4	2	0	2	9	8	+1	6
Ipswich Town	4	1	1	2	8	9	−1	4

Updated to match(es) played on 20 November 2026. Source:

14 August 2026	Ipswich Town	2–4	Coventry City	Colchester
19:00 BST	Al Hamadi 36'; Mauge 81'	Report	Jorgensen 34'; Lincoln 64' (pen.), 79' (pen.); Stretton 90'	Stadium: JobServe Community Stadium; Attendance: 104; Referee: Tolu Sangowawa

26 August 2026	Bromley	3–0	West Bromwich Albion	Bromley
19:00 BST	Paul-Lavaly 26'; Evans 46'; Haftom 73'	Report		Stadium: Copperjax Community Stadium; Attendance: 391; Referee: Craig Hicks

4 September 2026	Coventry City	0–3	West Bromwich Albion	Leamington Spa
19:00 BST		Report	McNeil 6'; DuPont 38'; Bray 67'	Stadium: Your Co-op Community Stadium; Attendance: 100; Referee: Kai Morgan

15 September 2026	Bromley	2–4	Ipswich Town	Bromley
19:00 BST	Paul-Lavaly 33'; Evans 50'	Report	Adetiba 23'; Pitts 75', 90+3'; Buabo 79' (pen.)	Stadium: Copperjax Community Stadium; Attendance: 354; Referee: Kirsty Dowle

9 October 2026	Ipswich Town	2–2	West Bromwich Albion	Colchester
19:00 BST	Runham 8', 13'	Report	Colesby 6' (pen.); McNeil 45+2'	Stadium: JobServe Community Stadium; Referee: Daniel England

13 October 2026	Bromley	1–2	Coventry City	Bromley
19:00 BST	Evans 6'	Report	Cullinane 82'; Lincoln 86'	Stadium: Copperjax Community Stadium; Attendance: 431; Referee: Jason Richardson

30 October 2026	Coventry City	1–0	Ipswich Town	Leamington Spa
19:00 GMT	Jorgensen 65'	Report		Stadium: Your Co-op Community Stadium; Attendance: 100; Referee: James Westgate

9 November 2026	West Bromwich Albion	2–3	Bromley	Perry Barr
19:00 GMT	Mohammed 13'; McNeil 23'	Report	Hobbs 26'; Wiltshire 88', 90+3'	Stadium: Alexander Stadium; Attendance: 75; Referee: Callum Walchester

20 November 2026	West Bromwich Albion	2–1	Coventry City	Perry Barr
19:00 GMT	Letlat 80'; Parmar 90+1'	Report	Critchlow-Woyo 50'	Stadium: Alexander Stadium; Referee: Michael Barlow

24 November 2026	Ipswich Town	v	Bromley	Ipswich
19:00 GMT				Stadium: Portman Road

4 December 2026	West Bromwich Albion	v	Ipswich Town	Perry Barr
19:00 GMT				Stadium: Alexander Stadium

7 December 2026	Coventry City	v	Bromley	Leamington Spa
19:00 GMT				Stadium: Your Co-op Community Stadium

=== Group I ===
Team	Pld	W	D	L	GF	GA	GD	Pts
Charlton Athletic (Q)	5	4	1	0	13	6	+7	13
Leeds United	5	1	2	2	6	6	0	5
Stockport County	4	1	0	3	8	11	−3	3
Stoke City	4	0	3	1	4	8	−4	3

Updated to match(es) played on 20 November 2026. Source:
(Q) Qualified for the phase indicated

14 August 2026	Stoke City	0–0	Leeds United	Newcastle-under-Lyme
19:00 BST		Report		Stadium: The GRG Waste Stadium; Attendance: 192; Referee: Dean Watson

26 August 2026	Stockport County	1–2	Charlton Athletic	Ashton-under-Lyne
19:00 BST	Astles 36'	Report	McMillan 19'; Brown 59'	Stadium: Tameside Stadium; Attendance: 187; Referee: Lewis Smith

4 September 2026	Charlton Athletic	1–0	Leeds United	Dartford
19:00 BST	McMillan 20'	Report		Stadium: Princes Park; Referee: Tommy Breen

4 September 2026	Stockport County	4–0	Stoke City	Stalybridge
19:00 BST	Astles 26', 83'; Gardner 32', 43'	Report		Stadium: Bower Fold; Referee: Richard Aspinall

9 October 2026	Leeds United	3–1	Stockport County	Guiseley
19:00 BST	Cresswell 8'; Njinko 26', 33'	Report	Huddleston 49'	Stadium: Nethermoor Park; Attendance: 312; Referee: Declan Bourne

9 October 2026	Stoke City	2–2	Charlton Athletic	Newcastle-under-Lyme
19:00 BST	Walker 67'; Makavore 72'	Report	McNamee-Burke 25'; Reid 51'	Stadium: The GRG Waste Stadium; Referee: Kavan Hurn

31 October 2026	Leeds United	2–2	Stoke City	Guiseley
15:00 GMT	Njinko 32'; Lienou 75' (pen.)	Report	Fearn 15'; Nixon 40'	Stadium: Nethermoor Park; Attendance: 171; Referee: Gareth Rhodes

3 November 2026	Charlton Athletic	6–2	Stockport County	Dartford
19:00 GMT	McMillan 7', 28', 38', 52', 73'; Washington-Amoah 45+1'	Report	Gardner 46' (pen.); Jones 90+3'	Stadium: Princes Park; Referee: Aji Ajibola

20 November 2026	Leeds United	1–2	Charlton Athletic	York
19:00 GMT	Njinko 24'	Report	Tagoe 9', 62'	Stadium: LNER Community Stadium; Referee: Charles King

20 November 2026	Stoke City	P–P	Stockport County	Newcastle-under-Lyme
19:00 GMT				Stadium: The GRG Waste Stadium

4 December 2026	Charlton Athletic	v	Stoke City	Dartford
19:00 GMT				Stadium: Princes Park

7 December 2026	Stockport County	v	Leeds United	Ashton-under-Lyne
15:00 GMT				Stadium: Tameside Stadium

=== Group J ===
Team	Pld	W	D	L	GF	GA	GD	Pts
Brentford	4	3	1	0	9	4	+5	10
Hull City	4	2	2	0	6	2	+4	8
Wycombe Wanderers	3	0	1	2	1	4	−3	1
Derby County	3	0	0	3	3	9	−6	0

Updated to match(es) played on 2 November 2026. Source:

14 August 2026	Derby County	1–4	Hull City	Long Eaton
19:00 BST	Mintus 35'	Report	Ashbee 15' (pen.); Devine 83'; Daley 84'; Silk 90+9'	Stadium: Grange Park; Attendance: 148; Referee: Aaron Bannister

16 August 2026	Brentford	2–0	Wycombe Wanderers	Staines-upon-Thames
12:00 BST	Dasilva 59'; Boni 81'	Report		Stadium: Wheatsheaf Park; Attendance: 400; Referee: Daniel Blades

8 September 2026	Hull City	1–1	Brentford	Kingston upon Hull
19:00 BST	Devine 21'	Report	Holland 35'	Stadium: MKM Stadium; Attendance: 65; Referee: Dean Watson

10 October 2026	Brentford	4–2	Derby County	Staines-upon-Thames
13:00 BST	Wheeler-Henry 2', 25'; Holland 15'; Nwosu 48'	Report	Oguntolu 66', 76'	Stadium: Wheatsheaf Park; Attendance: 150; Referee: Adam Merchant

13 October 2026	Hull City	0–0	Wycombe Wanderers	North Ferriby
19:00 BST		Report		Stadium: Versa Sportswear Stadium; Referee: Stuart Morland

2 November 2026	Hull City	1–0	Derby County	Kingston upon Hull
19:00 GMT	Wilson 90+1'	Report		Stadium: MKM Stadium; Attendance: 308; Referee: Gareth Thomas

2 November 2026	Wycombe Wanderers	1–2	Brentford	High Wycombe
19:00 GMT	Tezgel 45+3'	Report	Yarmolyuk 45'; Bobb-Semple 87'	Stadium: Adams Park; Attendance: 113; Referee: Joe Woolmer

22 November 2026	Brentford	v	Hull City	Staines-upon-Thames
13:00 GMT				Stadium: Wheatsheaf Park

27 November 2026	Derby County	v	Wycombe Wanderers	Long Eaton
19:00 GMT				Stadium: Grange Park

1 December 2026	Wycombe Wanderers	v	Derby County	High Wycombe
19:00 GMT				Stadium: Adams Park

7 December 2026	Derby County	v	Brentford	Long Eaton
19:00 GMT				Stadium: Grange Park

9 December 2026	Wycombe Wanderers	v	Hull City	High Wycombe
19:00 GMT				Stadium: Adams Park

=== Ranking of Group Runners-Up ===
Team	Pld	W	D	L	GF	GA	GD	Pts
Nottingham Forest	5	3	0	2	14	9	+5	9
AFC Bournemouth	4	3	0	1	11	7	+4	9
Sheffield United	4	3	0	1	8	5	+3	9
Huddersfield Town	4	2	2	0	11	6	+5	8
Hull City	4	2	2	0	6	2	+4	8
Southampton	4	2	1	1	11	4	+7	7
Bristol City	5	2	1	2	12	10	+2	7
Preston North End	4	2	1	1	5	4	+1	7
West Bromwich Albion	5	2	1	2	9	9	0	7
Leeds United	5	1	2	2	6	6	0	5

Updated to match(es) played on 20 November 2026. Source: Premier League

== Knockout stages ==
=== Round of 16 ===
The Round of 16 includes all 10 group winners and 6 highest-ranked runners-up.

	v
19:00 BST

	v
19:00 BST

	v
19:00 BST

	v
19:00 BST

	v
19:00 BST

	v
19:00 BST

	v
19:00 BST

	v
19:00 BST

=== Quarterfinals ===
	v
19:00 BST

	v
19:00 BST

	v
19:00 BST

	v
19:00 BST

=== Semifinals ===
	v
19:00 BST

	v
19:00 BST

=== Final ===
19:00 BST

v
