= Breslau Eleven =

Name of a 1937 German football team

Battle of Breslau
- Exhibition game
Germany	Denmark
(Nazi Germany)	(Denmark)
8	0
- Date: 16 May 1937
- Venue: Hermann Göring Stadion, Breslau
- Referee: Augustin Krist (Czechoslovakia)
- Attendance: 40,000

The Breslau Eleven (German: Breslau-Elf) was the name given to the Germany national football team who defeated Denmark 8–0 at Hermann-Göring-Sportfeld in Breslau, Germany (now Wrocław, Poland) on 16 May 1937. Coached by Sepp Herberger, the German side is generally regarded as one of the most famous teams in German football history. Likewise, the defeat has been characterized as the lowest point for Danish football. In Denmark, the game became known for posterity as the Battle of Breslau (Danish: Slaget i Breslau).

== Background ==
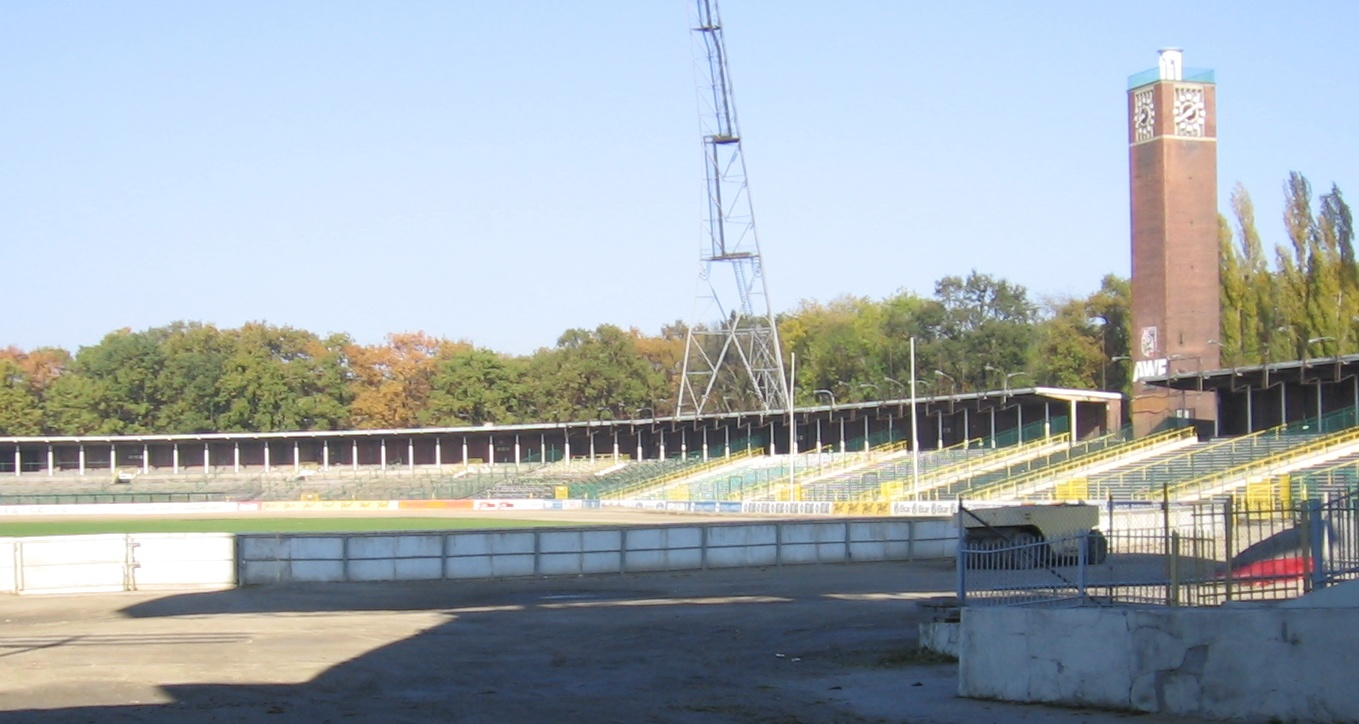
The Olympic Stadium in Wrocław was the venue for the match

The core players of the Breslau Eleven were first assembled during the 1934 FIFA World Cup under the management of Otto Nerz. The dominant German side of the era was Schalke 04, but the club's style of play, a quick passing game known as the Kreisel, was not suited to the more physical and direct tactical approach used by Nerz from observing English football. Consequently, only Fritz Szepan was a regular for both Schalke and the national team.

Nerz's tactics were initially successful, with Germany achieving a surprise third-place finish at the World Cup. Nerz had opted to make several changes to the side in the third-place playoff against Austria, with Hans Jakob replacing Willibald Kreß in goal due to the latter's poor performance in the semi-final defeat against Czechoslovakia. Also added to the starting lineup was Reinhold Münzenberg, allowing Szepan, who had previously been deployed as a centre half, to play in his more familiar position as an inside forward.

The success at the World Cup resulted in high expectations for the side during the 1936 Summer Olympics held in Berlin, but the team was defeated 2–0 by Norway in the second round. The result effectively cost Nerz his job as he began handing over control to assistant Sepp Herberger over the next 18 months. Following the Olympics, Herberger opted to rebuild the team based on Schalke's Kreisel system, and Szepan's teammates Rudi Gellesch and Adolf Urban soon became regulars for the national side.

== The match ==
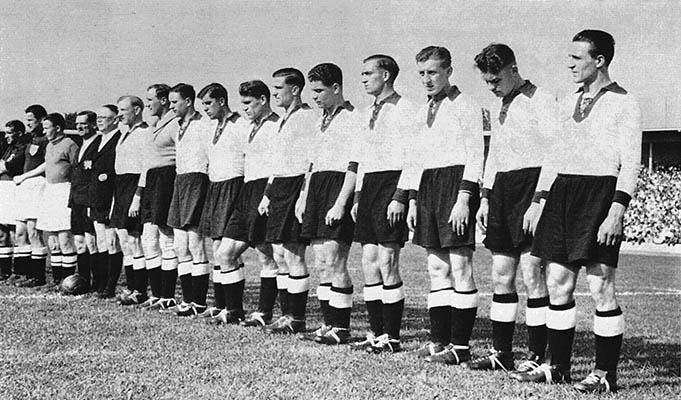
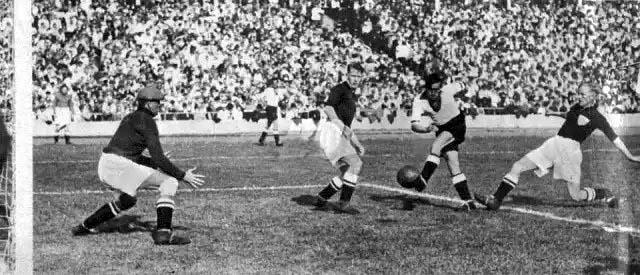
(Left): Both starting line-ups on the field; (right): a moment of the match with Germany attempting to score
16 May 1937

Germany	8–0	Denmark
Lehner 7'; Siffling 33', 40', 44', 48', 65'; Urban 70'; Szepan 78'

Hermann Göring Stadion, Breslau
Attendance: 40,000
Referee: Augustin Krist (Czechoslovakia)

Germany
Denmark

GK	Hans Jakob
DF	Paul Janes
DF	Reinhold Münzenberg
MF	Andreas Kupfer
MF	Ludwig Goldbrunner
MF	Albin Kitzinger
FW	Ernst Lehner
FW	Rudolf Gellesch
FW	Otto Siffling
FW	Fritz Szepan (c)
FW	Adolf Urban
Manager:
(Germany) Sepp Herberger

GK	Svend Jensen
DF	Poul Hansen
DF	Oscar Jørgensen
MF	Carl Larsen
MF	Henry Nielsen
MF	Poul Jensen
FW	Helmuth Søbirk
FW	Eyolf Kleven
FW	Pauli Jørgensen (c)
FW	Kaj Uldaler
FW	Eigil Thielsen
Manager:
?

== Aftermath ==
Coached by Sepp Herberger, the German side went undefeated in all eleven matches they played in 1937, winning ten of them. The Breslau Eleven was broken up following the Anschluss with Austria in March 1938. Due to political pressure, Herberger was forced to include Austrian-born players in his team for the upcoming 1938 World Cup. The team failed to live up to expectations, and was defeated in the first round of the tournament by Switzerland.

For the Danish national team, the loss is still the largest in team history. The loss would have been even deservedly bigger, had goalkeeper Svend Jensen not played the best game of his international career. Seven Danish players were subsequently dropped for the next national team game, including Carl Larsen, who had remarked that it was simply too warm weather for football on the day. The 0–8 defeat was to be Larsen's only game for Denmark. The Danish play was later rationalized as being caused by very poor fitness, and, perhaps most significantly, a clash of tactical formations among the Danish defenders. Svend Jensen, Poul Hansen and Henry Nielsen played the 2–3–5 tactic used in their club (Boldklubben af 1893), while Carl Larsen and Poul Jensen played the modern WM formation of their club (Akademisk Boldklub). Not until English coach Edward Magner was hired in 1939 did the Danish amateurs undergo sufficient physical conditioning and were properly schooled in the WM tactic.

== See also ==
- History of the Germany national football team
- History of the Denmark national football team
- UEFA Euro 1992 Final
- Brazil v Germany (2014 FIFA World Cup)
- 2001 Germany v England football match
