= Carl Larsen (footballer) =

Danish footballer (1911–1995)

Personal information
- Date of birth: 25 March 1911
- Date of death: 22 December 1995 (aged 84)

International career
Years	Team	Apps	(Gls)
1937	Denmark	1	(0)

Carl Larsen (25 March 1911 – 22 December 1995) was a Danish footballer. He played in one match for the Denmark national football team in 1937.
