= Adolf Urban =

German footballer

Personal information
- Date of birth: 9 January 1914
- Place of birth: Gelsenkirchen, Kingdom of Prussia, German Empire
- Date of death: 27 May 1943 (aged 29)
- Place of death: Staraya Russa, RSFSR, Soviet Union
- Position: Forward

Senior career*
Years	Team	Apps	(Gls)
- Schalke 04

International career
1935–1941	Germany	21	(11)
- * Club domestic league appearances and goals

Adolf Urban (9 January 1914 – 27 May 1943) was a German footballer. Urban played as a forward for the football club Schalke 04, among others. He made 21 appearances for Germany between 1935 and 1941, scoring 11 goals. He was also part of Germany's squad at the 1936 Summer Olympics.

In the Second World War Urban was mobilised with the Wehrmacht in which he served in the 422nd Infantry Regiment on the Eastern Front in Russia, fighting at the battle of Demyansk. He later died in 1943 in Staraya Russa, from wounds received in further fighting. He was the only member of the Breslau Eleven to die in combat.

His body was buried in the Karpovo Military Cemetery but was later repatriated and reburied in November 2013 in Schalke cemetery in Gelsenkirchen.
