= Sir Roger Appleton, 1st Baronet =

Sir Roger Appleton, 1st Baronet (died 16 January 1614), was an English landowner and baronet.

Appleton was the son of Henry Appleton of South Benfleet, Essex, and Faith Cardinal. He was educated at St John's College, Cambridge. He inherited his father's estates, including Jarvis Hall, in 1607. He was knighted by James I upon becoming High Sheriff of Essex in 1608. On 29 June 1611 he was made a Baronet, of South Bernfleet in the County of Essex, during the second round of creations by James I.

He married Anne, the daughter of Sir Thomas Mildmay, with whom he had two daughters and a son:

- Sir Henry Appleton, 2nd Baronet (died 1649), married Joan, daughter of Edward Sheldon Esq.
- Frances Appleton, married Francis Goldsmith
- Mary Appleton, married Thomas Hanley Esq.

Political offices
Preceded by Sir Henry Maxey	High Sheriff of Essex; 1608	Unknown
Baronetage of England
New creation	Baronet (of South Benfleet); 1611–1614	Succeeded by Sir Henry Appleton
