= Hans Jakob (footballer) =

German footballer

Personal information
- Date of birth: 16 June 1908
- Place of birth: Munich, German Empire
- Date of death: 24 March 1994 (aged 85)
- Place of death: Regensburg, Germany
- Position: Goalkeeper

Senior career*
Years	Team	Apps	(Gls)
1926–1942	SSV Jahn Regensburg		
1942–1946	Bayern Munich		
1946–1949	1. FC Lichtenfels		

International career
1930–1939	Germany	38	(0)
Medal record
Men's football
Representing Germany
FIFA World Cup
Third place	1934 Italy
- * Club domestic league appearances and goals

Hans Jakob (16 June 1908 – 24 March 1994) was a German football player. He was born in Munich.

He played over 1000 games as goalkeeper for SSV Jahn Regensburg, and also for FC Bayern Munich from 1942 to 1945. He earned 38 caps for the Germany national football team, and was part of two World Cups teams in 1934 and 1938, but played in only one game, the third-place playoff in 1934. Jakob was a member of the famous "Breslau Elf" that defeated Denmark 8–0 in 1937. In his 38 international games, Jakob kept eleven clean-sheets and while he was in goal, Germany were only defeated eight times. He was also part of Germany's squad at the 1936 Summer Olympics.

'Jakl' Jakob was an all-round athlete who managed considerable results in track-and-field, winning the Bavarian hurdles race championships repeatedly, which led a decathlon promoter to almost persuade him to pursue a decathlon career. Jakob became Germany’s number one goal keeper after the 1934 World Cup, replacing Willibald Kress, who had fallen out of favour with Reich coach Otto Nerz after a momentous blunder by Kress in the semi-final had arguably cost Germany a place in the final. He died in Regensburg.

In his 1978 book Fussball, Helmut Schön characterised Jakob as follows:

"Thanks to his size and physical impact he was especially adept in catching high crosses and usually prevailed in turmoils inside the goal mouth."
