= History of the Germany national football team =

Germany
- Nickname(s): DFB-Team (DFB Team); Nationalelf (National Eleven); DFB-Elf (DFB Eleven); Die Mannschaft (The Team) (Note: In Germany, the team is typically referred to as Die Nationalmannschaft (The national team), DFB-Team, DFB-Elf (DFB eleven), DFB-Auswahl (DFB selection) or Nationalelf (National eleven). Whereas in foreign media, they are regularly described as Die Mannschaft (The Team). As of June 2015, this was acknowledged by the DFB as official branding of the team. In July 2022 the German Football Association abolished this branding as an official nickname, due to rejection by many German fans.)
- Association: Deutscher Fußball-Bund (DFB)
- Confederation: UEFA
- Most caps: Lothar Matthäus (150)
- Top scorer: Miroslav Klose (71)
- FIFA code: GER

FIFA ranking
- Highest: 1 (December 1992 – August 1993, December 1993 – March 1994, June 1994, July 2014 – June 2015, July 2017, September 2017 – June 2018)
- Lowest: 22 (March 2006)

First international
- Switzerland 5–3 Germany (Basel, Switzerland; 5 April 1908)

Biggest win
- Germany 16–0 Russia (Stockholm, Sweden; 1 July 1912)

Biggest defeat
- England Amateurs 9–0 Germany (Oxford, England; 13 March 1909) (Note: This match is not considered to be a full international by the English FA, and does not appear in the records of the England team.)

World Cup
- Appearances: 21 (first in 1934)
- Best result: Champions (1954, 1974, 1990, 2014)

European Championship
- Appearances: 14 (first in 1972)
- Best result: Champions (1972, 1980, 1996)

Summer Olympic Games
- Appearances: 13 (Note: by Germany national team, East Germany national team, United Team of Germany and Germany national under-23 team) (first in 1912)
- Best result: (gold) Gold Medal (1976)

Confederations Cup
- Appearances: 3 (first in 1999)
- Best result: Champions (2017)
Medal record
FIFA World Cup
Gold medal – first place	1954 Switzerland	Team
Gold medal – first place	1974 West Germany	Team
Gold medal – first place	1990 Italy	Team
Gold medal – first place	2014 Brazil	Team
Silver medal – second place	1966 England	Team
Silver medal – second place	1982 Spain	Team
Silver medal – second place	1986 Mexico	Team
Silver medal – second place	2002 South Korea–Japan	Team
Bronze medal – third place	1934 Italy	Team
Bronze medal – third place	1970 Mexico	Team
Bronze medal – third place	2006 Germany	Team
Bronze medal – third place	2010 South Africa	Team
UEFA European Championship
Gold medal – first place	1972 Belgium	Team
Gold medal – first place	1980 Italy	Team
Gold medal – first place	1996 England	Team
Silver medal – second place	1976 Yugoslavia	Team
Silver medal – second place	1992 Sweden	Team
Silver medal – second place	2008 Austria–Switzerland	Team
Bronze medal – third place	1988 West Germany	Team
Bronze medal – third place	2012 Poland–Ukraine	Team
Bronze medal – third place	2016 France	Team
Summer Olympic Games
Gold medal – first place	1976 Montreal	Team
Silver medal – second place	1980 Moscow	Team
Silver medal – second place	2016 Rio de Janeiro	Team
Bronze medal – third place	1964 Tokyo	Team
Bronze medal – third place	1972 Munich	Team
Bronze medal – third place	1988 Seoul	Team
FIFA Confederations Cup
Gold medal – first place	2017 Russia	Team
Bronze medal – third place	2005 Germany	Team

The history of the Germany national football team began in 1908, when Germany played its first international match. Since then, the Germany national football team has been one of the most successful football teams, winning four FIFA World Cups and three UEFA European Championships.

== History ==
=== Early years ===
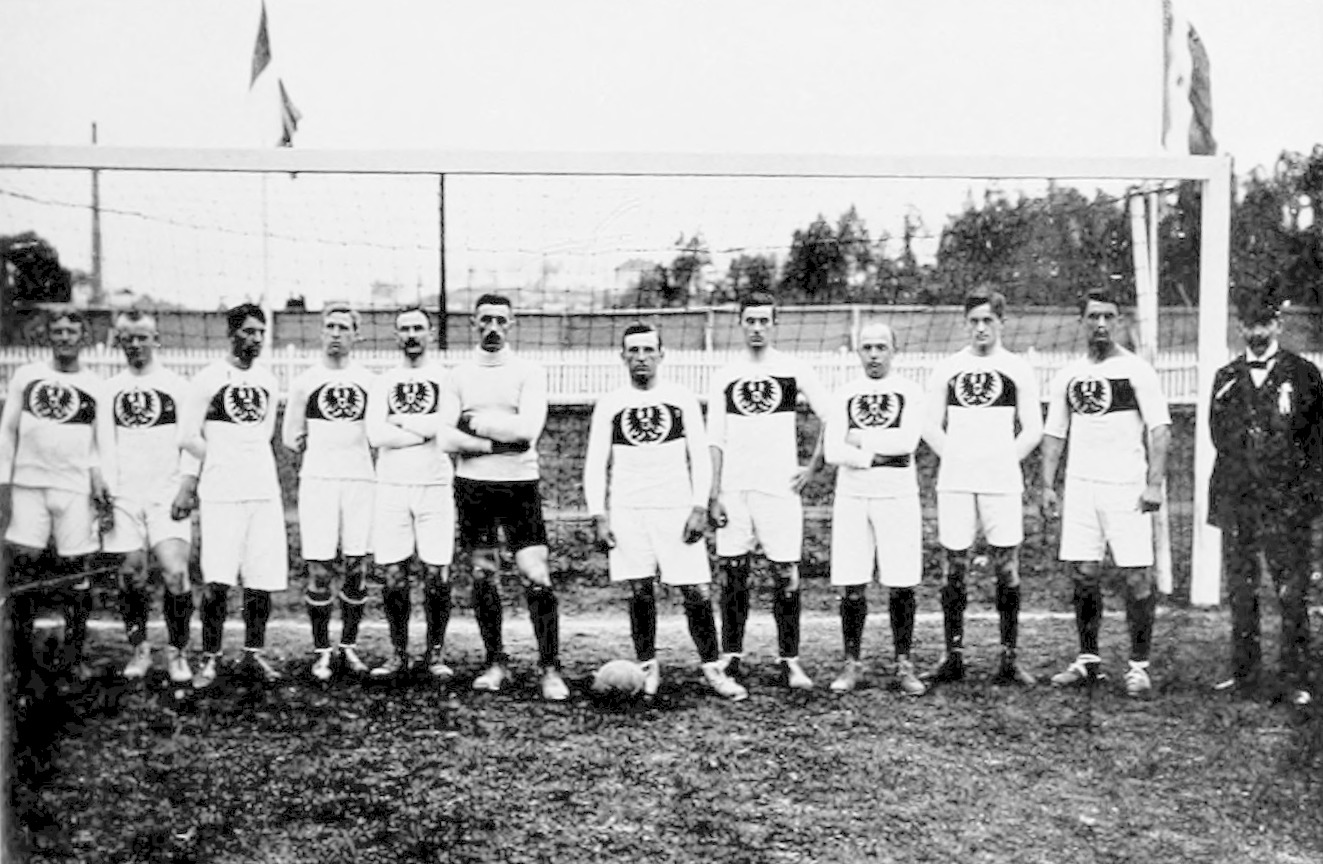
Germany at the 1912 Summer Olympics.

On 18 April 1897, an early international game on German soil was played in Hamburg when a selection team from the Danish Football Association defeated a selection team from the Hamburg-Altona Football Association, 5–0.

Between 1899 and 1901, prior to the formation of a national team, there were five unofficial international matches between different German and English selection teams, which all ended as large defeats for the German teams. Eight years after the establishment of the German Football Association (DFB), the first official match of the Germany national football team was played on 5 April 1908, against Switzerland in Basel, with the Swiss winning 5–3. Coincidentally, the first match after World War I in 1920, the first match after World War II in 1950 when Germany was still banned from most international competitions, and the first match in 1990 with former East German players were all against Switzerland as well. Germany's first championship title was even won in Switzerland.

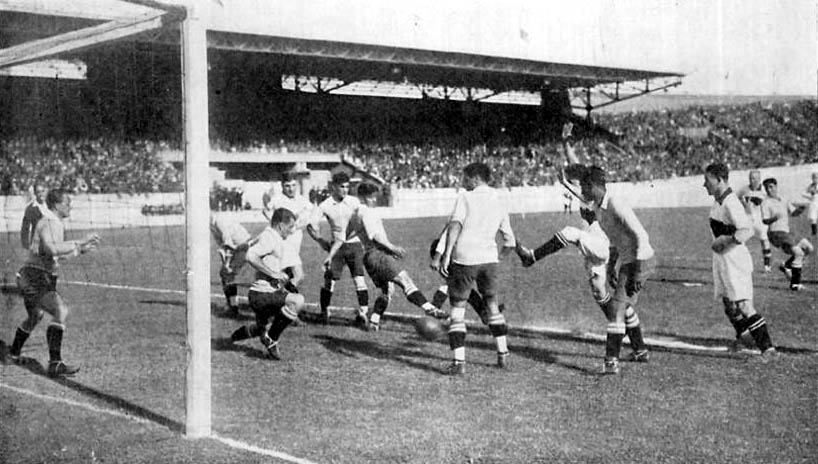
Germany playing Uruguay at the 1928 Summer Olympics.

At that time the players were selected by the DFB, as there was no dedicated coach. The first manager of the Germany national team was Otto Nerz, a school teacher from Mannheim, who served in the role from 1926 to 1936. The German FA could not afford travel to Uruguay for the first World Cup staged in 1930 during the Great Depression, but finished third in the 1934 World Cup in their first appearance in the competition. After a poor showing at the 1936 Olympic Games in Berlin, Sepp Herberger became coach. In 1937 he put together a squad which was soon nicknamed the Breslau Elf (the Breslau Eleven) in recognition of their 8–0 win over Denmark in the then German city of Breslau, Lower Silesia (now Wrocław, Poland).

After Austria became part of Germany in the Anschluss of March 1938, that country's national team – one of Europe's better sides at the time due to professionalism – was disbanded despite having already qualified for the 1938 World Cup. As required by Nazi politicians, five or six ex-Austrian players, from the clubs Rapid Vienna, Austria Vienna, First Vienna FC, were ordered to join the all-German team on short notice in a staged show of unity orchestrated for political reasons. In the 1938 World Cup that began on 4 June in France, this "united" German team led 1–0 against Switzerland, but managed only a 1–1 draw. After leading 2–0 in the replay, held again in Paris, they lost 2–4 in front of a hostile crowd. That early yet undefeated (the replay being considered a tie-breaker like a penalty shootout) exit in the round of 16 stood as Germany's worst ever World Cup result (excluding the 1930 and 1950 tournaments in which they did not compete), until Germany's group stage exit at the 2018 FIFA World Cup. They appeared in all other World Cups and advanced to the final eight, or better.

During World War II, the team played over 30 international games between September 1939 and November 1942, when national team games were suspended, as most players had to join the armed forces. Many of the national team players, and even ethnic German players from other national teams like Ernst Willimowski, were gathered together under coach Herberger as Rote Jäger through the efforts of a sympathetic air force officer trying to protect the footballers from the most dangerous wartime service.

=== Three German teams ===
After the Second World War, Germany was banned from competition in most sports until about 1950, with none of the three new German states, West Germany, East Germany and Saarland, entering the 1950 World Cup qualifiers, since the DFB was only reinstated as full FIFA member after this World Cup.

==== West Germany ====
As in most aspects of life, the pre-war traditions and organizations of Germany were carried on by the Federal Republic of Germany, which was referred to as West Germany. This applied to the restored DFB which had its headquarters in Frankfurt am Main and still employed coach Sepp Herberger. With recognition by FIFA and UEFA, the DFB maintained and continued the record of the pre-war team. Neighbouring Switzerland was once again the first team that played West Germany in 1950, with Turkey and Republic of Ireland being the only non-German speaking nations to play them in friendly matches during 1951.

After only 18 post war games in total, West Germany qualified for the 1954 World Cup, having prevailed against Norway and the "third German state", the Saarland.

==== Saarland ====
The Saar protectorate, otherwise known as Saarland, was split from Germany and put under French control between 1947 and 1956. Saarland did not want to join French organizations and was barred from participating in pan-German ones. Thus, they sent separate teams to the 1952 Summer Olympics and also to the 1954 World Cup qualifiers, when Saarland finished below West Germany but above Norway in their qualification group, having won in Oslo. Legendary coach Helmut Schön was the manager of the Saarland team from 1952 until 1957 when the territory acceded to the Federal Republic of Germany. He went on to coach the championship-winning team of the 1970s.

==== East Germany ====
In 1949, the communist German Democratic Republic was founded in the Soviet-occupied eastern part of the country. A separate football competition emerged in what was commonly known as East Germany. In 1952 the Deutscher Fußball-Verband der DDR (DFV) was established and the East Germany national football team took to the field. They were the only team to beat the 1974 World Cup winning West Germans in a highly symbolic event for the divided nation that was the only meeting of the two sides. East Germany went on to win the gold medal at the 1976 Olympics. After the fall of the Berlin Wall in 1989 and German reunification in 1990, the eastern football competition was reintegrated into the DFB.

=== Das Wunder von Bern ===
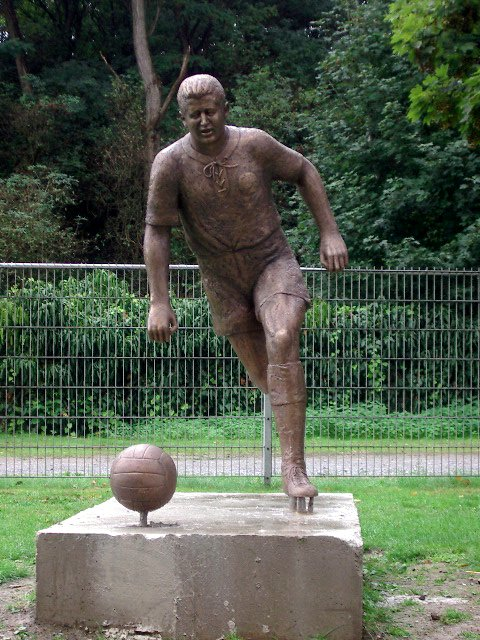
A statue of Helmut Rahn, who scored the winning goal in the 1954 FIFA World Cup final

West Germany, captained by Fritz Walter, met in the 1954 World Cup some of the teams they had played in friendly matches, namely Turkey, Yugoslavia and Austria. When playing favourites Hungary in the group stage, with good chances to qualify for the next round even in case of defeat, coach Sepp Herberger did not field his best players, saving them from the experience of a 3–8 loss. West Germany would go on to meet Hungary again in the final, facing the legendary team of Mighty Magyars again, which had gone unbeaten for 32 consecutive matches. In a shocking upset, West Germany came back from an early two goal deficit to win 3–2, with Helmut Rahn scoring the winning goal with only six minutes remaining. The success is called "The Miracle of Bern" (Das Wunder von Bern). The unexpected victory created a sense of euphoria throughout a divided postwar Germany. The triumph is credited with playing a significant role in securing the postwar ideological foundation of the Federal Republic of Germany.

=== Memorable losses: Wembley goal and Game of the Century ===
After finishing fourth in the 1958 World Cup and reaching only the quarter-finals in the 1962 World Cup, the DFB had to make changes. Following examples set abroad, professionalism was introduced, and the best clubs from the various Regionalligas were assembled into the new Bundesliga. In 1964, Helmut Schön took over as coach, replacing Herberger who had been in office for 28 years.

In the 1966 World Cup, West Germany reached the final after beating the USSR in the semifinal, facing hosts England at Wembley Stadium. Wolfgang Weber's last-minute goal took the game into extra time, a goal claimed to be controversial by the English, with the ball appearing to hit the hand of a German player as it travelled through the England penalty area before he prodded it in. The first extra time goal by Geoff Hurst, nicknamed Wembley-Tor (Wembley goal) in Germany, is still controversial after all this time. As the Swiss referee did not see the situation properly, the opinion of the Soviet linesman Tofik Bakhramov who believed that the ball bounced back from the net rather than the crossbar led to one of the most contentious goals in the history of football. While the Germans pushed hard to tie the game, spectators entered the field in the final seconds, and Hurst scored another controversial goal giving England a 4–2 win.

West Germany gained a measure of revenge in the 1970 World Cup by knocking England out in the quarter-finals 3–2, having been 2–0 down, before they suffered another memorable extra time loss, this time in the semi-final against Italy at Estadio Azteca. Karl-Heinz Schnellinger scored during injury time to level the match at 1–1, and during extra time, both teams held the lead at one time. Memorably, Franz Beckenbauer remained on the field even with a dislocated shoulder, his arm in a sling strapped to his body, as West Germany had used up their two allowed substitutions. Eventually won 4–3 by Italy, this match with five goals in extra time is one of the most dramatic in World Cup history, and is called "Game of the Century" in both Italy (Partita del secolo) and Germany (Jahrhundertspiel). While the exhausted Italians lost to Brazil, West Germany went on to claim third place by beating Uruguay 1–0, and Gerd Müller finished as the tournament's top scorer with 10 goals.

=== World Cup title on home soil ===
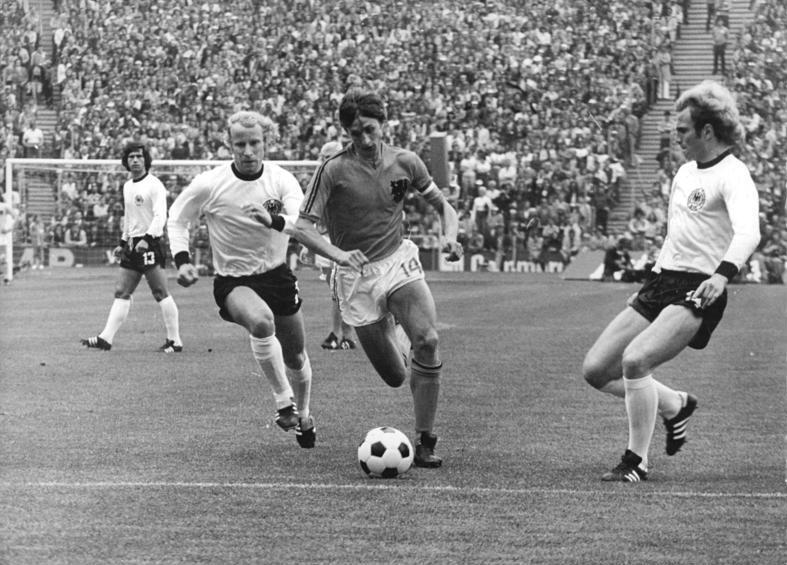
1974 FIFA World Cup Final on 7 July 1974, in Munich (Olympiastadion).

In 1971, Franz Beckenbauer became captain of the national team, and he led West Germany to great success as they became both the European and World Champions. They won the European Championship on their first try at Euro 1972, defeating the Soviet Union 3–0 in the final. Then, as hosts of the 1974 World Cup, they won their second World Cup, defeating the Netherlands 2–1 in the final at the Olympiastadion in Munich.

Two matches in the 1974 World Cup stood out for West Germany. The first group stage saw a politically charged match as West Germany played a game against East Germany. Both teams already were qualified for advance to the next round, and the East Germans won 1–0. The West Germans adjusted their line up after the loss and advanced to the final which was the other outstanding match, against the Johan Cruijff-led Dutch team and their brand of "Total Football". Cruijff was brought down early in the German penalty area following a solo run before any of the German players had even touched the ball, and the Dutch took the lead from the ensuing penalty with just a minute gone on the clock. However, West Germany managed to come back, tying the match on a penalty scored by Paul Breitner, and winning it with Gerd Müller's goal just before half-time. A second goal by Müller was ruled offside.

=== Late 1970s and early 1980s ===
West Germany failed to defend their titles in the next two major international tournaments. They lost to Czechoslovakia in the final of Euro 1976 in a penalty shootout by a score of 5–3 after the match finished 2–2, with Uli Hoeneß famously kicking the ball sky high. Since that loss, Germany has not lost a penalty shootout in major international tournaments. In fact, until Lukas Podolski's shot was saved by the Serbian goalkeeper Vladimir Stojković during group play of the 2010 World Cup, the last penalty missed by a German player dates back to the 1982 World Cup semifinals when the French goalkeeper Jean-Luc Ettori saved Uli Stielike's shot.

In the 1978 World Cup, Germany was eliminated in the second group stage after losing 2–3 to Austria, who had already been eliminated from the round of 16. Schön retired as coach afterward, and the post was taken over by his assistant, Jupp Derwall.

West Germany's first tournament under Derwall was successful, as they earned their second European title at Euro 1980 after defeating Belgium 2–1 in the final. West Germany then reached the final of the 1982 World Cup, though not without difficulties. They were upset 1–2 by Algeria in their first match, but managed to advance to the second round with a controversial 1–0 win over Austria. Then, in the semifinal against France, they came back from down 1–3 during extra time to tie the match 3–3 and won the following penalty shootout 5–4. In the final, they were defeated by Italy 1–3.

During this period, West Germany also had one of the world's most productive goal scorers in Gerd Müller, who racked up fourteen goals in two World Cups (1970 and 1974). His ten goals in 1970 are the third-most ever in a tournament, behind France's Just Fontaine and Hungarian Sándor Kocsis. Though Müller's all-time World Cup record of 14 goals was broken by Ronaldo in 2006, it took Ronaldo three tournaments to do so (1998, 2002, and 2006) before Germany's Miroslav Klose surpassed the mark with 16 goals, scored over four tournaments (2002, 2006, 2010 and 2014).

=== Beckenbauer's triumph as coach ===
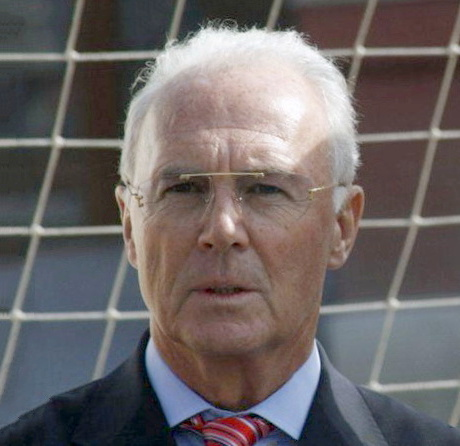
Franz Beckenbauer

After West Germany were unexpectedly eliminated in the first round of Euro 1984, Franz Beckenbauer returned to the national team to replace Derwall as coach. In the 1986 World Cup in Mexico, West Germany had a slow start to the tournament thanks partly to the hot climate and high altitude- conditions that were for the most part foreign to nearly all of the European teams. In the warm, rainy aridity and high altitude of Querétaro they drew with Uruguay 1–1, were beaten 2–0 by a flying Denmark side and beat Scotland 2–1, finishing runner up behind Denmark in their group. They then traveled to the intense heat and humidity of Monterrey to face Morocco, which they won 1–0 and then to face the hosts Mexico. After a goalless draw, West Germany won on penalties 5–4, and they would then travel to the tropical heat, rain and altitude of Guadalajara to face a strong Michel Platini-led French side- a rematch between the two sides after a classic duel during the previous World Cup in Spain. West Germany held their nerve to beat the French 2–0, and they then traveled to the 7,380 ft altitude of Mexico City to face a Diego Maradona-led Argentina in the final at the famous Azteca Stadium. Argentina took a 2–0 lead but Karl-Heinz Rumenigge and Rudi Voller tied the game in the second half, but Argentina scored a 3rd in the 85th minute and West Germany finished as runners-up for the second consecutive tournament. In Euro 1988, West Germany's hopes of winning the tournament on home soil were spoiled by the Netherlands, as the Dutch gained revenge of their loss in 1974 by beating them 2–1 in the semifinals.

In the 1990 World Cup, West Germany finally won their third World Cup title in its unprecedented third consecutive final appearance. Captained by Lothar Matthäus, they defeated Yugoslavia (4–1) where Matthäus scored a goal from the halfway line; they then confidently thumped the United Arab Emirates (5–1) and drew with Colombia 1–1, all in Milan. In the Round of 16, they then played bitter rivals the Netherlands in Milan, which proved to be a bad-tempered, ugly game that was somewhat reflective of the whole tournament. Striker Rudi Völler and Dutch midfielder Frank Rijkaard were both sent off by the temperamental and emotionally aggressive Argentine referee after arguing and violently tackling each other in the span of a few minutes, including a blatant handball by a furious Voller. Goals by Jürgen Klinsmann and Andreas Brehme meant that Germany went on to win 2–1, and then in their quarter-final match they beat Czechoslovakia 1–0 in Milan. For their semi-final they went to play England in Turin, which proved to be a closely contested match between two equally skilled sides. Brehme scored a fluke goal early in the second half, but England's Gary Lineker equalized later in the second half and the match ended 1–1, but West Germany went on to win 4–3 on penalties, and the Germans were on the way to a final rematch against Argentina in Rome. West Germany won an ugly and difficult match 1–0, with the only goal being a penalty scored in the 85th minute by Andreas Brehme after Klinsmann was fouled in the Argentine penalty box. Beckenbauer, who won the World Cup as the national team's captain in 1974, thus became the second person ever (preceded only by Mário Zagallo) to win the World Cup as both player and coach, and the first as both captain and coach. West Germany were also the tournament top scorers, scoring 14 goals.

=== Olympic football ===
Medal record

Olympic Games
Bronze medal – third place	1988 Seoul	Team
Silver medal – second place	2016 Rio de Janeiro	Team

Prior to 1984, Olympic football was an amateur event, meaning that only non-professional players could participate. Due to this, West Germany was never able to achieve the same degree of success at the Olympics as at the World Cup, with the first medal coming in the 1988 Olympics, when they won the bronze medal. It took Germany 28 years to participate at the Olympics again in 2016, this time reaching the final and winning a silver medal. West Germany also reached the second round in both 1972 and 1984. On the other hand, due to having an ability to field its top-level players who were classified as amateurs on a technicality East Germany did better, winning a gold, a silver and two bronze medals (one representing the United Team of Germany).

=== Recording of the players from the former GDR and champion at UEFA Euro 1996 in England (1990–1998) ===
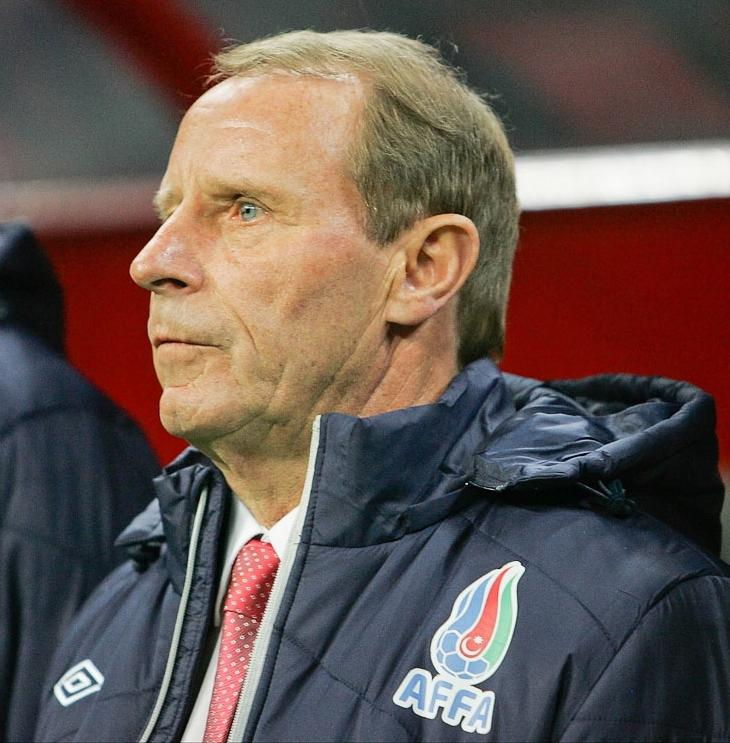
Berti Vogts

In February 1990, months after the fall of the Berlin Wall, the draw for the 1992 European Championship qualifying tournament saw East Germany and West Germany drawn together in Group 5. After West Germany's 1990 World Cup win, with assistant Berti Vogts taking over as the national team coach, the retiring Beckenbauer infamously predicted that the German team, with additional former East Germans to choose from, would be invincible for years to come. The reunification of Germany was confirmed in August to take effect on 3 October 1990, with the accession of the former GDR to the Federal Republic of Germany. The members of the East German association Deutscher Fußball-Verband acceded to the DFB in November, while the 1990–91 seasons would continue, with the restructuring of leagues scheduled for 1991–92. The first game with a unified German team, including former East German internationals such as Matthias Sammer and Ulf Kirsten, was against Switzerland on 19 December.

In Euro 1992, Germany reached the final, but lost 0–2 to surprise winners Denmark. As the defending champions in the 1994 World Cup, this tournament proved to be rough for the German squad, who hadn't changed much since the 1990 World Cup, but they were still a strong side: Matthaus was still captaining the team and Klinsmann, Brehme, Voller and Ilgner were retained. The German squad beat Bolivia 1–0 in the tournament's opening match and they drew with Spain 1–1, playing both matches in Chicago. Then, they traveled down to the intense 35 °C (95 °F) heat of Dallas to play South Korea, a match they won 3–2 with Klinsmann scoring 2 goals. After this victory, midfielder Stefan Effenberg was sent home by Vogts after he gave an obscene hand gesture to German fans and journalists after being substituted out during the 75th minute. Germany then advanced to the Round of 16, and they beat European rivals Belgium 3–2 in Chicago; Voller scored 2 goals in the first half. And then, a low point in German football came about. The tough German squad then went to Giants Stadium just outside New York City to play Bulgaria in the quarter-finals, and they were upset 1–2 by the lowly ranked team, even though they led for the first part of the match after Matthaus scored from a penalty 2 minutes into the second half. But Bulgarian star player Hristo Stoichkov scored in the 75th minute, and the German team effectively fell apart, and this allowed Yordan Letchkov to score 3 minutes later, and the Germans were never able to equalize. Vogts returned home to face a barrage of criticism, although he stayed on as manager.

Reunified Germany won their first major international title at Euro 1996, becoming the European champions for the third time. They defeated hosts England on penalty kicks (6–5 after a 1–1 draw) in the semifinals and the Czech Republic 2–1 in the final, a match decided by a golden goal scored by Oliver Bierhoff. Matthias Sammer won the Ballon d'Or in 1996 for his performances for Germany and Borussia Dortmund.

However, in the 1998 World Cup, Germany were again eliminated by a less-heralded opponent in the quarterfinals, this time in a 0–3 defeat to Croatia. Vogts stepped down afterwards and was replaced by Erich Ribbeck.

=== Twice disappointing after the group stage at UEFA Euro, 2002 World Cup final and 2006 World Cup at home soil (1998–2006) ===
Ribbeck soon found himself faced with the issue of an ageing squad, several members of which chose to retire after their World Cup exit, leaving him relying on the remaining members of the Euro 1996-winning team, and untested new players. Despite this, the team won their UEFA Euro 2000 qualifying group relatively comfortably, albeit with automatic qualification not being definitively secured until their final group game.

In Euro 2000, the aging team went out in the first round after failing to win any of their three matches, including an embarrassing 0–3 loss to an understrength Portugal side (who had already advanced to the next round), and their first competitive loss against England (who themselves performed poorly at the tournament, losing both of their other matches) since the 1966 World Cup final. Ribbeck resigned amid strong public criticism and was replaced temporarily and then permanently by Rudi Völler – after planned successor Christoph Daum was involved in a drug scandal.

Coming into the 2002 World Cup, expectations of the German team were low due to poor results in the qualifiers. This included not directly qualifying for the finals for the first time. The team nonetheless dealt a thrashing to Saudi Arabia 8–0 in their first match. In the knockout stages, riding on the heroics of Oliver Kahn and Michael Ballack they produced three consecutive 1–0 wins against Paraguay, the United States, and co-hosts South Korea, setting up a final against Brazil, the first World Cup meeting between the two. Unfortunately Ballack was suspended for the final due to accumulated yellow cards and Kahn was injured during the final proper. In a hard-fought match, Germany thus lost 0–2. Nevertheless, Miroslav Klose won the Silver Boot and German captain and goalkeeper Oliver Kahn won the Golden Ball, the first time in the World Cup's history that a goalkeeper was named the best player of the tournament, as well as the Yashin-Award for the best goalkeeper in the tournament.

Germany failed to build on their success in 2002 and again exited in the first round of Euro 2004, this time drawing their first two matches and losing the third. As was the case in 2000, the team exited losing to an understrength side that had already advanced, in this case the Czech Republic. Even though Germany dominated the match, they could not score, losing to a Czech goal scored on the break. Völler resigned afterwards, denouncing the constant media criticism in a famous TV interview. The national team had to find their third new coach in six years after having had only six coaches in the previous 75 years. When prospective candidates including Ottmar Hitzfeld and Otto Rehhagel turned down the job, former national team player Jürgen Klinsmann, who had never held any coaching jobs before, was appointed. In similar style to Beckenbauer's former role as team manager without a coaching license, the experienced Joachim Löw from Stuttgart was appointed to assist him.

Klinsmann made Michael Ballack the captain following Euro 2004. Klinsmann's main task was to lead the national team to a good showing at the 2006 World Cup being hosted in Germany.

Prior to the start of the tournament, hopes were not as high for Germany as in previous tournaments (even in Germany itself), even though it was the host nation. Critics pointed out the apparent lack of quality players in the squad and coach Klinsmann's decision to live in America rather than Germany. However, Germany won the opening game of the World Cup against Costa Rica 4–2. They continued to develop both confidence and support across the group stage, conceding no further goals as they beat Poland 1–0 and Ecuador 3–0, with Miroslav Klose scoring twice and Lukas Podolski adding another in the last match. Germany finished on top of their group with three wins. The team went on to defeat Sweden 2–0 in the round of 16, with Lukas Podolski netting both goals in only 12 minutes, from assists by Miroslav Klose.

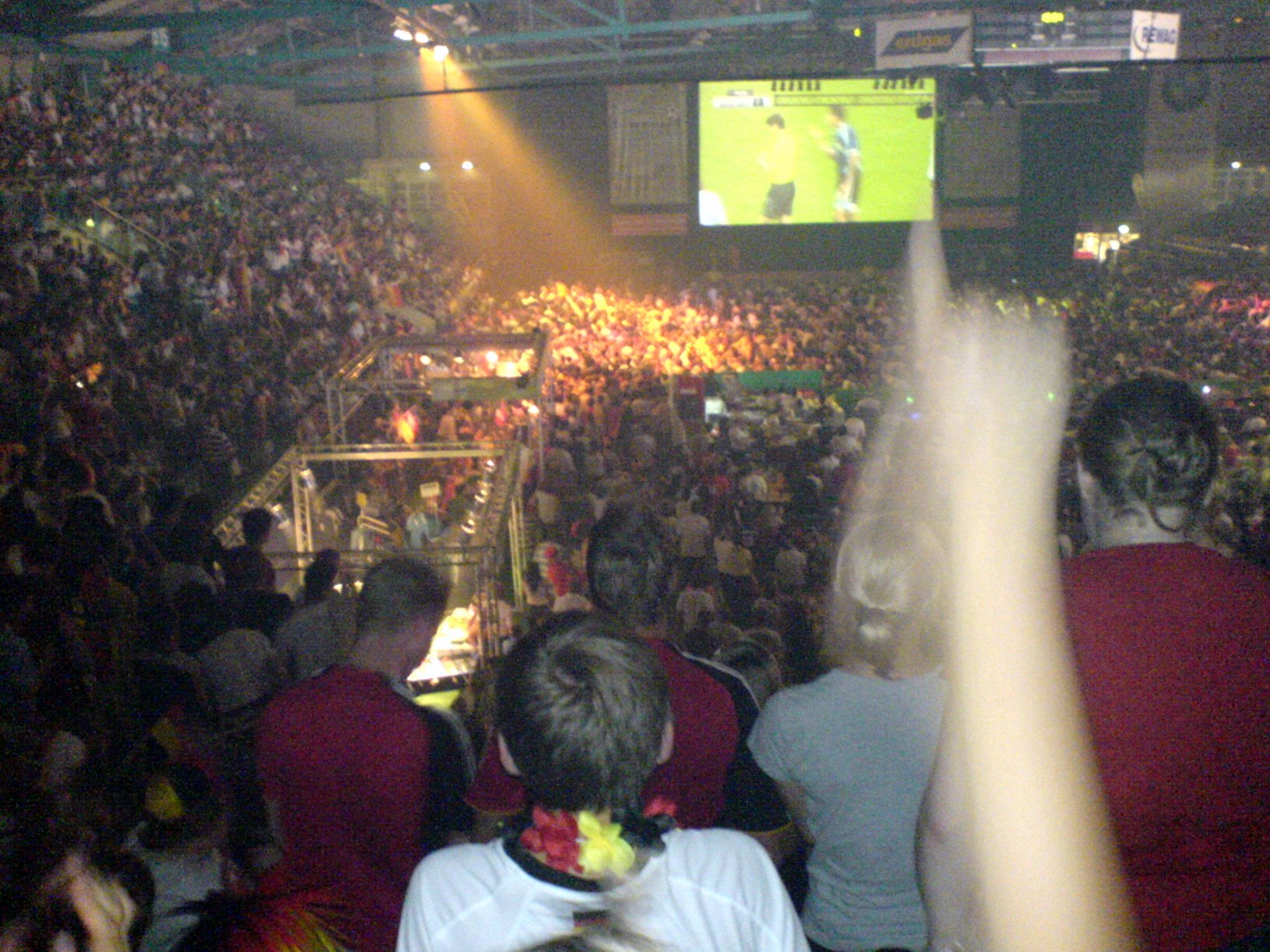
People watching the Germany vs. Argentina match at the Donau Arena in Regensburg

Germany faced favorites Argentina in the quarter-finals, a team that Germany had not defeated since the 1990 World Cup. Germany's clean sheet streak was broken shortly after half time as Argentina scored first to grab a 0–1 lead. However, Michael Ballack's cross, flicked on by Tim Borowski, allowed Klose to head in the equalizer with 10 minutes to spare. During the subsequent penalty shootout, goalkeeper Jens Lehmann saved two shots while his teammates all converted their shots to win the shootout 4–2. After the game, the Argentinians started a brawl, which later resulted in a match ban for midfielder Torsten Frings after Italian television networks showed video footage of him participating in the fight.

Expectations rose in Germany following these results, with many thinking that a record eighth appearance in the World Cup final was possible even though a starter was missing and the players were tired after already playing a tough 120 minutes against Argentina. In the semifinal match against Italy, the match went to extra time again, and hopes grew high that another penalty shootout would take the team to the final match in Berlin. However, despite Klinsmann's focus on fitness, the speed and concentration of the German players faded, and they conceded two goals in the final ninety seconds of extra time.

Despite having their dreams of playing in the final dashed, Klinsmann's squad quickly recovered their composure, and journalists noted the team's upbeat mood in the practices leading up to the third-place match. Three starters, including captain Michael Ballack, would not be available for the third place match, and their opponent Portugal's goalkeeper, Ricardo, had up to that point conceded only one goal in regular play. Nonetheless, Germany thoroughly defeated Portugal 3–1, at one point leading 3–0 due to Bastian Schweinsteiger's two goals and an own goal, also off his shot, by Portugal's Petit.

With this victory, Germany ended the World Cup on a high, not only with the 3–1 win over Portugal in the battle for third place, but also with several awards: Miroslav Klose was awarded the Golden Boot for his tournament-leading five goals, becoming the first player from the united Germany to earn it, and fellow striker Lukas Podolski won the 'Best Young Player' award. Furthermore, four of Germany's players (Jens Lehmann, Philipp Lahm, Michael Ballack, and Miroslav Klose) were selected for the tournament All-Star Team. In addition, with 14 goals scored, the German side scored more goals than any other team in the tournament. After the tournament, over 500,000 people honored the team by giving them a hero's welcome at the Brandenburg Gate in Berlin.

=== No more than second place (2006–2012) ===
Germany's entry into the Euro 2008 qualifying round was marked partially by the promotion of Joachim Löw to head coach, since Klinsmann retired in spite of a public outcry for him to continue managing the Mannschaft. Löw did not have the sweeping charisma of his predecessor, but the reputation of being a shrewd and capable tactician. He quickly became notable for continually introducing talented young players into his team, leading to a continuous rejuvenation of the squad. In a group with the Czech Republic and the Republic of Ireland, Germany qualified comfortably, defeating San Marino in a record 13–0 away win along the way.

For the final tournament, Germany were placed into Group B alongside Poland, Croatia and longtime rivals Austria. Germany defeated Poland 2–0 but suffered an ignominious 1–2 defeat to Croatia, compounded by a red card for Bastian Schweinsteiger for an aggressive off-the-ball incident. Germany entered the knockout round with a victory over Austria in the last match of group play. The only scorer of the game was Michael Ballack, who scored in the 49th minute with a powerful long-distance free-kick that was later chosen as the German Goal of the Year. Their quarterfinal opponent was Portugal. Germany started well and took an early lead after Schweinsteiger converted a cross from Lukas Podolski. Miroslav Klose made it 2–0 after heading in a free kick by Schweinsteiger. Portugal responded with a goal right before halftime, but Germany reclaimed their two-goal lead in the second half when Schweinsteiger assisted another header, this time by Michael Ballack. Germany saw out the rest of the match comfortably, conceding a late consolation goal, leaving the final score at 3–2.

Germany went into their semifinal match against Turkey as the favourites. However, the team put up a nervous and shaky performance, falling behind due to Uğur Boral's goal in the 22nd minute. Bastian Schweinsteiger equalised, and Miroslav Klose put Germany ahead with less than twelve minutes left only for Semih Şentürk to level the score in the last minutes of the match. Just as the game was heading for extra time, defender Philipp Lahm cut inside past Colin Kazim-Richards, exchanged passes with Thomas Hitzlsperger, and stole in at the near post to score in the final minute, sending Germany into the final against Spain.

Spain were the heavy favourites but Germany was believed to be one of the few sides able to challenge them. Spain controlled the game and took the lead through Fernando Torres. Germany ended up losing the match 0–1, finishing as the runners-up of the tournament.

For the qualification for World Cup 2010, Germany were placed in a group with Azerbaijan (led by former Germany coach Berti Vogts), Finland, Liechtenstein, Russia, and Wales. Germany comfortably qualified as top of the group with 8 wins and two draws (both against Finland).

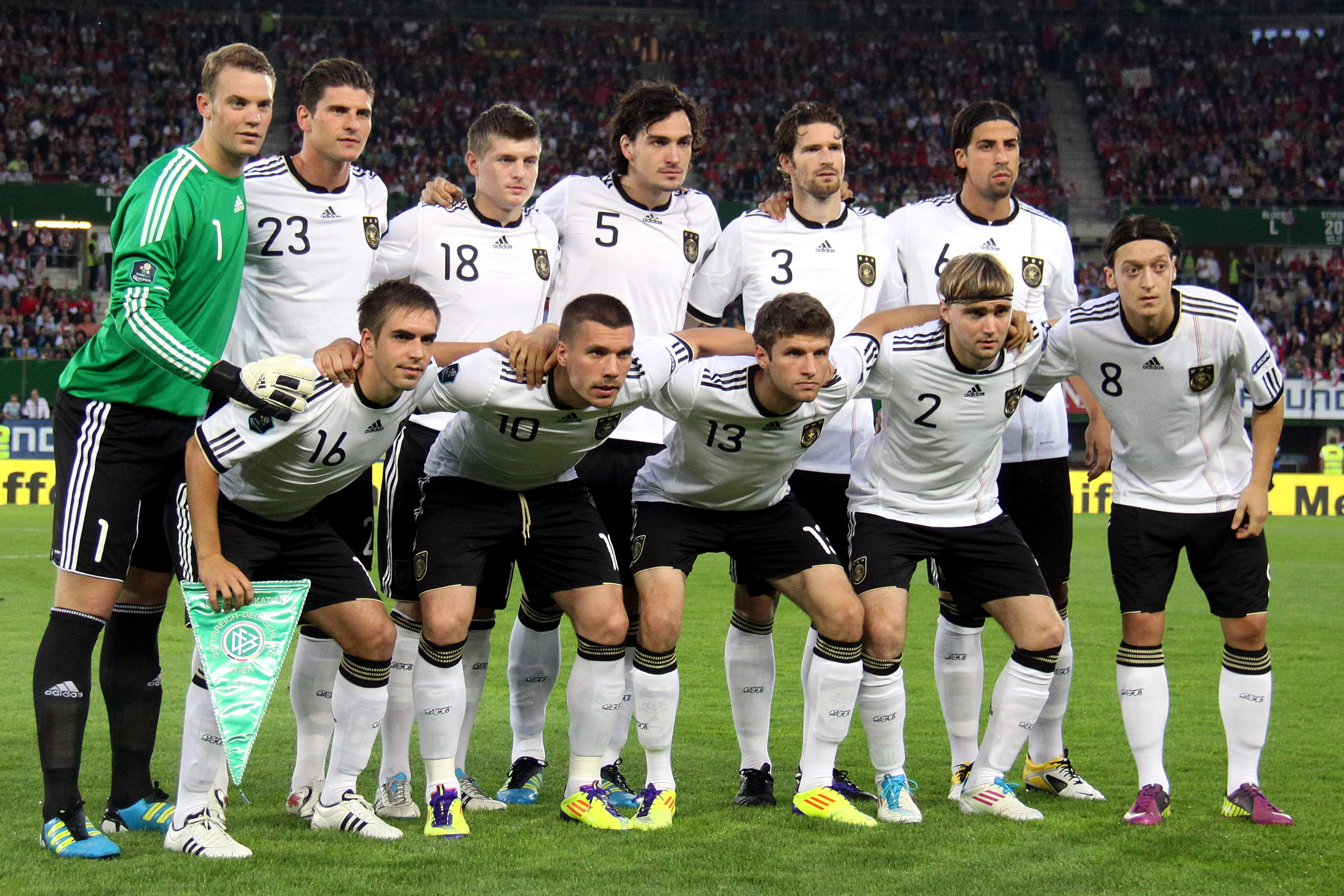
Germany national football team during Euro 2012 qualifiers

The 2010 World Cup draw, which took place on 4 December 2009, placed Germany in Group D, along with Australia, Serbia, and Ghana. Throughout the tournament, Germany impressed by playing an attractive, attacking style of football. On 13 June 2010, they played their first match of the tournament against Australia and won 4–0. They lost their second match 0–1 to Serbia. Their next match against Ghana was won 1–0 by a goal from Mesut Özil. Germany went on to win the group and advanced to the knockout stage. In the round of 16, Germany defeated England 4–1, England's highest World Cup loss to date. At 2–1, however, the game controversially had a goal by Frank Lampard disallowed, despite video replays that showed the ball beyond the goal line. In the quarterfinals, Germany defeated Argentina 4–0; this match was also celebrated striker Miroslav Klose's 100th international cap and the match in which he tied German legend Gerd Müller's record of 14 World Cup goals, one behind the all-time record of 15 World Cup goals, which is held by Ronaldo of Brazil. In the semi-final on 7 July, Germany lost 1–0 to Spain, in an almost flashback to the finals of Euro 2008. Germany played Uruguay for Third Place, as in 1970, and won the match 3–2 on 10 July.

Germany scored the most with a total of 16 goals in the 2010 World Cup, in comparison, the winning nation Spain scored only 8 goals. The German team became the first team since Brazil in 1982 to record the highest goal difference in a World Cup without winning it. In an internet poll, Germany was voted the World Cups Most Entertaining Team, although FIFA discontinued the official award. German youngster Thomas Müller won the Golden Boot with the most goals and assists scored (succeeding teammate Miroslav Klose), and he was also given the Best Young Player Award (succeeding teammate Lukas Podolski).

The German team reflected the changing demographic of Germany. It was significantly multicultural, as 11 of the players in the final 23-man World Cup Finals roster were eligible to play for other countries, despite 10 of the 11 being born or raised in Germany. The 11th, Cacau, arrived from Brazil in his late teens. Despite this transition, Germany kept the traditional strength as a team that excels when playing at major tournaments with a well-attuned team. Prior to the World Cup the Mannschaft lost in a friendly to England 2–1, another friendly against Argentina 1–0, and less than a year after the World Cup Germany lost against Australia 2–1. While losing on home soil in friendlies, Germany decisively thrashed all these three teams in the tournament in South Africa, scoring four goals in each match.

Germany qualified top of Group A in qualification for UEFA Euro 2012 with a record of 10 wins out of ten matches against Kazakhstan, Turkey, Austria, Belgium, and Azerbaijan.

Pos	Team	Pld	W	D	L	GF	GA	GD	Pts	Qualification	(Germany)	(Turkey)	(Belgium)	(Austria)	(Azerbaijan)	(Kazakhstan)
1	Germany	10	10	0	0	34	7	+27	30	Qualify for final tournament	—	3–0	3–1	6–2	6–1	4–0
2	Turkey	10	5	2	3	13	11	+2	17	Advance to play-offs	1–3	—	3–2	2–0	1–0	2–1
3	Belgium	10	4	3	3	21	15	+6	15		0–1	1–1	—	4–4	4–1	4–1
4	Austria	10	3	3	4	16	17	−1	12		1–2	0–0	0–2	—	3–0	2–0
5	Azerbaijan	10	2	1	7	10	26	−16	7		1–3	1–0	1–1	1–4	—	3–2
6	Kazakhstan	10	1	1	8	6	24	−18	4		0–3	0–3	0–2	0–0	2–1	—

Source: UEFA
Rules for classification: Qualification tiebreakers

The draw for the final tournament took place on 2 December 2011 at the Ukraine Palace of Arts in Kyiv, Ukraine. Germany was placed in group B along with Portugal, Netherlands, and Denmark, thus making it the group of death.

As the only team to have won all three group matches, Germany went on to defeat Greece in the quarter-final and set a historic record in international football of 15 consecutive wins in all competitive matches. In the semi-final match against Italy, despite high expectations, Germany was unable to break the record to defeat Italy in any competitive matches.

9 June 2012
21:45 UTC+3

Germany	1–0	Portugal
Gómez 72'	Report

Arena Lviv, Lviv
Attendance: 32,990
Referee: Stéphane Lannoy (France)

13 June 2012
21:45 UTC+3

Netherlands	1–2	Germany
Van Persie 73'	Report	Gómez 24', 38'

Metalist Stadium, Kharkiv
Attendance: 37,750
Referee: Jonas Eriksson (Sweden)

17 June 2012
21:45 UTC+3

Denmark	1–2	Germany
Krohn-Dehli 24'	Report	Podolski 19'; Bender 80'

Arena Lviv, Lviv
Attendance: 32,990
Referee: Carlos Velasco Carballo (Spain)

22 June 2012
20:45 UTC+2

Germany	4–2	Greece
Lahm 39'; Khedira 61'; Klose 68'; Reus 74'	Report	Samaras 55'; Salpingidis 89' (pen.)

PGE Arena, Gdańsk
Attendance: 38,751
Referee: Damir Skomina (Slovenia)

28 June 2012
20:45 UTC+2

Germany	1–2	Italy
Özil 90+2' (pen.)	Report	Balotelli 20', 36'

National Stadium, Warsaw
Attendance: 55,540
Referee: Stéphane Lannoy (France)

=== World championship title in Brazil and group elimination in Russia (2012–2018) ===
On 30 July 2011 at the 2014 FIFA World Cup preliminary draw, Germany were placed in Group C. They commenced their qualifying campaign in late 2012 in a group that featured contenders Sweden, Republic of Ireland, Austria, Faroe Islands and Kazakhstan.

Group C
Pos	Team	Pld	W	D	L	GF	GA	GD	Pts	Qualification	Germany national football team	Sweden men's national football team	Austria national football team	Republic of Ireland national football team	Kazakhstan national football team	Faroe Islands national football team
1	Germany	10	9	1	0	36	10	+26	28	Qualification to 2014 FIFA World Cup	—	4–4	3–0	3–0	4–1	3–0
2	Sweden	10	6	2	2	19	14	+5	20	Advance to second round	3–5	—	2–1	0–0	2–0	2–0
3	Austria	10	5	2	3	20	10	+10	17		1–2	2–1	—	1–0	4–0	6–0
4	Republic of Ireland	10	4	2	4	16	17	−1	14		1–6	1–2	2–2	—	3–1	3–0
5	Kazakhstan	10	1	2	7	6	21	−15	5		0–3	0–1	0–0	1–2	—	2–1
6	Faroe Islands	10	0	1	9	4	29	−25	1		0–3	1–2	0–3	1–4	1–1	—

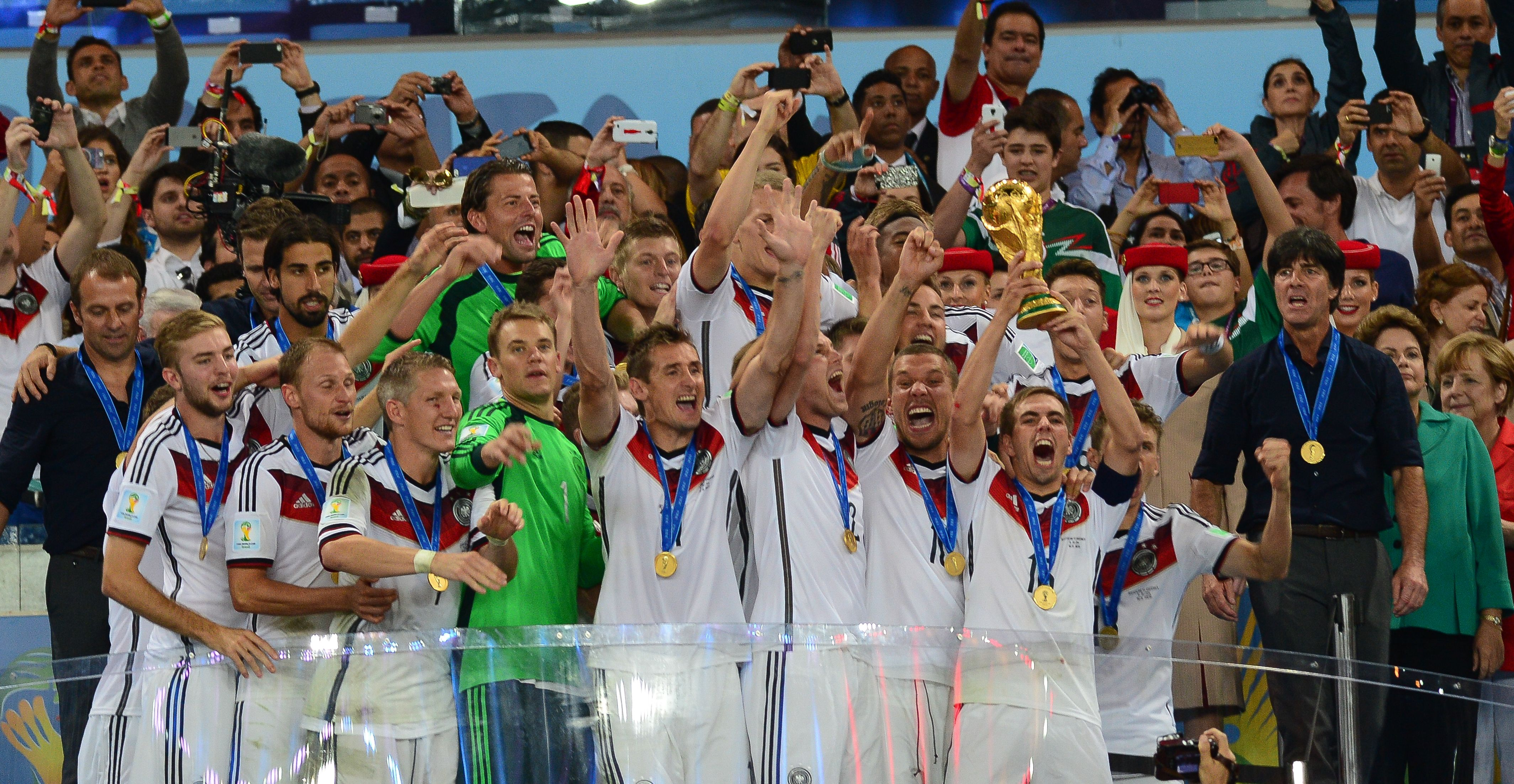
Germany captain Philipp Lahm lifts the World Cup trophy.

The draw for the 2014 FIFA World Cup finals placed Germany in Group G along with Portugal, Ghana, and the United States. The German Football Association constructed a purpose-built training base, Campo Bahia, for their stay in Brazil. Germany started the tournament with a 4–0 defeat of Portugal, with Thomas Muller scoring a hat trick. They drew their next match with Ghana 2–2. Miroslav Klose tied Ronaldo's record of fifteen World Cup finals goals in the match. Germany won their final game against the United States 1–0. They played Algeria in the round of 16 in a rematch of their encounter in 1982. Germany prevailed 2–1 after extra time. They then defeated France 1–0 in the quarterfinals. They faced Brazil in the semi-finals where they won a decisive 7–1 victory. Klose scored the second goal of the game, surpassing Ronaldo for the record of most goals in the World Cup. Germany defeated Argentina 1–0 in the final on 13 July and obtained its fourth title.

Group G

Pos	Team	Pld	W	D	L	GF	GA	GD	Pts	Qualification
1	Germany	3	2	1	0	7	2	+5	7	Advance to knockout stage
2	United States	3	1	1	1	4	4	0	4	Advance to knockout stage
3	Portugal	3	1	1	1	4	7	−3	4	
4	Ghana	3	0	1	2	4	6	−2	1	

Source: FIFA
Rules for classification: Tie-breaking criteria

30 June 2014
17:00 BRT (UTC−3)

Germany	2–1 (a.e.t.)	Algeria
Schürrle 92'; Özil 119'		Djabou 120+1'

Estádio Beira-Rio, Porto Alegre
Attendance: 43,063
Referee: Sandro Ricci (Brazil)

4 July 2014
13:00 BRT (UTC−3)

France	0–1	Germany
		Hummels 13'

Estádio do Maracanã, Rio de Janeiro
Attendance: 74,240
Referee: Néstor Pitana (Argentina)

8 July 2014
17:00 BRT (UTC−3)

Brazil	1–7	Germany
Oscar 89'		Müller 11'; Klose 23'; Kroos 24', 26'; Khedira 29'; Schürrle 69', 79'

Estádio Mineirão, Belo Horizonte
Attendance: 58,141
Referee: Marco Antonio Rodríguez (Mexico)

13 July 2014
16:00 BRT (UTC−3)

Germany	1–0 (a.e.t.)	Argentina
Götze 113'

Maracanã Stadium, Rio de Janeiro
Attendance: 74,738
Referee: Nicola Rizzoli (Italy)

After finishing first in the UEFA Euro 2016 qualifying Group D, Germany managed to win their group ahead of Poland, Northern Ireland and Ukraine. In the knock-out stages, they overcome Slovakia with a 3–0 win, then they won against Italy 6–5 in a penalty shootout (after a 1–1 draw) for the first time in a major tournament. Their journey ended in the semi-finals after a 2–0 loss against the host-nation France, the French's first competitive win against Germany in 58 years.

Having qualified as the 2014 World Cup Champion, the German coach Joachim Löw decided to participate in the competition with a young team captained by Julian Draxler. The team won their group ahead of Chile, Australia and Cameroon. Then, they won against Mexico 4–1 in the semi-finals to progress to the final. Unexpectedly, the young team managed to win Germany their first FIFA Confederations Cup title ever after a 1–0 win against Chile at the Krestovsky Stadium in Saint Petersburg.

Despite winning their 10 matches in the 2018 FIFA World Cup qualification. Germany went out from the World Cup group stage. Their first exit in the first round for the first time since 1938, after two losses and only one win. The first match was against Mexico, the team which they beat in the FIFA Confederations Cup a year earlier, the match ended with a 1–0 win for the Mexicans, the German first loss in an opening match since the 1982 World Cup against Algeria. The second match was against Sweden which ended in a 2–1 win, thanks to Toni Kroos's 95th-minute goal. In the last match, Germany needed a "one-goal" win against South Korea to reach the next round, but two late goals during second-half stoppage time from South Korea made the defending champions to leave the competition with only bad memories.

Germany, known in German as a "Tournament Team" (German: Turniermannschaft), came to the 2018 tournament without their 2014 heroes Mario Götze and André Schürrle. The retirement of key players such as Philipp Lahm, Bastian Schweinsteiger, and Miroslav Klose meant the loss of leading players. During the tournament, poor performances by main players such as Thomas Müller and Sami Khedira, as well as wrong team selection by the coach Joachim Löw were the main factors in the devastating early exit. Moreover, complacency and lack of sharpness of the attacking players were obvious according to former player and coach Jürgen Klinsmann.

=== Poor results and second World Cup early exit (2019–2023) ===
Germany finished second in Group F, behind France and ahead of Portugal and Hungary. In the round of 16, they lost 2–0 against England at Wembley Stadium, which was their last match under coach Joachim Löw.

Under new coach Hansi Flick, Germany was eliminated in the group stage for the second time in a row, as they finished third in their group behind Japan and Spain.

== Competition records ==
=== FIFA World Cup ===
FIFA World Cup record									Qualification record					
Year	Round	Position	Pld	W	D*	L	GF	GA	Pld	W	D	L	GF	GA
(Uruguay) 1930	Did not enter								Did not enter					
(Italy) 1934	Third place	3rd	4	3	0	1	11	8	1	1	0	0	9	1
(France) 1938	First round	10th	2	0	1	1	3	5	3	3	0	0	11	1
(Brazil) 1950	Banned from entering								Banned from entering					
(Switzerland) 1954	Champions	1st	6	5	0	1	25	14	4	3	1	0	12	3
(Sweden) 1958	Fourth place	4th	6	2	2	2	12	14	Qualified as defending champions					
(Chile) 1962	Quarter-finals	7th	4	2	1	1	4	2	4	4	0	0	11	5
(England) 1966	Runners-up	2nd	6	4	1	1	15	6	4	3	1	0	14	2
(Mexico) 1970	Third place	3rd	6	5	0	1	17	10	6	5	1	0	20	3
(West Germany) 1974	Champions	1st	7	6	0	1	13	4	Qualified as hosts					
(Argentina) 1978	Second group stage	6th	6	1	4	1	10	5	Qualified as defending champions					
(Spain) 1982	Runners-up	2nd	7	3	2	2	12	10	8	8	0	0	33	3
(Mexico) 1986	Runners-up	2nd	7	3	2	2	8	7	8	5	2	1	22	9
(Italy) 1990	Champions	1st	7	5	2	0	15	5	6	3	3	0	13	3
(United States) 1994	Quarter-finals	5th	5	3	1	1	9	7	Qualified as defending champions					
(France) 1998	Quarter-finals	7th	5	3	1	1	8	6	10	6	4	0	23	9
(South Korea) (Japan) 2002	Runners-up	2nd	7	5	1	1	14	3	10	6	3	1	19	12
(Germany) 2006	Third place	3rd	7	5	1	1	14	6	Qualified as hosts					
(South Africa) 2010	Third place	3rd	7	5	0	2	16	5	10	8	2	0	26	5
(Brazil) 2014	Champions	1st	7	6	1	0	18	4	10	9	1	0	36	10
(Russia) 2018	Group stage	22nd	3	1	0	2	2	4	10	10	0	0	43	4
(Qatar) 2022	Group stage	17th	3	1	1	1	6	5	10	9	0	1	36	4
(Canada) (Mexico) (United States) 2026	Round of 32	18th	4	2	1	1	11	5	6	5	0	1	16	3
Total	4 Titles	21/23	116	70	22*	24	243	135	110	88	18	4	344	77

*Denotes draws include knockout matches decided via penalty shoot-out.
**Gold background colour indicates that the tournament was won.
***Red border colour indicates tournament was held on home soil.

=== UEFA European Championship ===
UEFA European Championship record									Qualification record					
Year	Round	Position	Pld	W	D*	L	GF	GA	Pld	W	D	L	GF	GA
(France) 1960	Did not enter								Did not enter					
(Spain) 1964	Did not enter								Did not enter					
(Italy) 1968	Did not qualify								4	2	1	1	9	2
(Belgium) 1972	Champions	1st	2	2	0	0	5	1	8	5	3	0	13	3
(Socialist Federal Republic of Yugoslavia) 1976	Runners-up	2nd	2	1	1	0	6	4	8	4	4	0	17	5
(Italy) 1980	Champions	1st	4	3	1	0	6	3	6	4	2	0	17	1
(France) 1984	Group stage	5th	3	1	1	1	2	2	8	5	1	2	15	5
(West Germany) 1988	Semi-finals	3rd	4	2	1	1	6	3	Qualified as hosts					
(Sweden) 1992	Runners-up	2nd	5	2	1	2	7	8	6	5	0	1	13	4
(England) 1996	Champions	1st	6	4	2	0	10	3	10	8	1	1	27	10
(Belgium) (Netherlands) 2000	Group stage	14th	3	0	1	2	1	5	8	6	1	1	20	4
(Portugal) 2004	Group stage	12th	3	0	2	1	2	3	8	5	3	0	13	4
(Austria) (Switzerland) 2008	Runners-up	2nd	6	4	0	2	10	7	12	8	3	1	35	7
(Poland) (Ukraine) 2012	Semi-finals	3rd	5	4	0	1	10	6	10	10	0	0	34	7
(France) 2016	Semi-finals	3rd	6	3	2	1	7	3	10	7	1	2	24	9
(Europe) 2020	Round of 16	14th	4	1	1	2	6	7	8	7	0	1	30	7
(Germany) 2024	Quarter-finals	5th	5	3	1	1	11	4	Qualified as hosts					
Total	3 Titles	14/17	58	30	14*	14	89	59	106	76	20	10	267	68

*Denotes draws include knockout matches decided via penalty shoot-out.
**Gold background colour indicates that the tournament was won.
***Red border colour indicates tournament was held on home soil.

=== FIFA Confederations Cup ===
FIFA Confederations Cup record
Year	Round	Position	Pld	W	D*	L	GF	GA	Squad
(Saudi Arabia) 1992	Did not enter								
(Saudi Arabia) 1995	Did not qualify								
(Saudi Arabia) 1997	Did not enter								
(Mexico) 1999	Group stage	5th	3	1	0	2	2	6	Squad
(South Korea) (Japan) 2001	Did not qualify								
(France) 2003	Did not enter								
(Germany) 2005	Third place	3rd	5	3	1	1	15	11	Squad
(South Africa) 2009	Did not qualify								
(Brazil) 2013	Did not qualify								
(Russia) 2017	Champions	1st	5	4	1	0	12	5	Squad
Total	1 Title	3/10	13	8	2	3	29	22	—

*Denotes draws including knockout matches decided via penalty shoot-out.
**Gold background colour indicates that the tournament was won.
***Red border colour indicates tournament was held on home soil.

Note: All tournaments from 1950 to 1990 inclusively were competed as West Germany.

== Men's honours ==
=== Major competitions ===
FIFA World Cup

- Champions (4): 1954, 1974, 1990, 2014
- Runners-up (4): 1966, 1982, 1986, 2002
- Third place (4): 1934, 1970, 2006, 2010
- Fourth place (1): 1958

UEFA European Championship

- Champions (3): 1972, 1980, 1996
- Runners-up (3): 1976, 1992, 2008
- Semi-finals (3): 1988, 2012, 2016

Summer Olympic Games

- Gold Medal (1): 1976
- Silver Medal (2): 1980, 2016
- Bronze Medal (3): 1964, 1972, 1988
- Fourth place (1): 1952

FIFA Confederations Cup

- Champions (1): 2017
- Third place (1): 2005

UEFA Nations League

- Fourth place (1): 2025

Overview
Event	1st place	2nd place	3rd place	4th place
FIFA World Cup	4	4	4	1
UEFA European Championship	3	3	3	x
Summer Olympic Games	1	2	3	1
FIFA Confederations Cup	1	0	1	0
UEFA Nations League	0	0	0	1
Total	9	9	11	3

== Women's honours ==
=== Major competitions ===
FIFA Women's World Cup

- Champions (2): 2003, 2007
- Runners-up (1): 1995
- Fourth place (2): 1991, 2015

UEFA Women's Championship

- Champions (8): 1989, 1991, 1995, 1997, 2001, 2005, 2009, 2013
- Runners-up (1): 2022
- Fourth place (1): 1993

Summer Olympic Games

- Gold Medal (1): 2016
- Bronze Medal (4): 2000, 2004, 2008, 2024

UEFA Women's Nations League

- Runners-up (1): 2025
- Third place (1): 2024

Overview
Event	1st place	2nd place	3rd place	4th place
FIFA Women's World Cup	2	1	0	2
UEFA Women's Championship	8	1	0	1
Summer Olympic Games	1	0	4	0
UEFA Women's Nations League	0	1	1	0
Total	11	3	5	3

== Previous squads ==
FIFA World Cup squads

- 1934 FIFA World Cup squad
- 1938 FIFA World Cup squad
- 1954 FIFA World Cup squad
- 1958 FIFA World Cup squad
- 1962 FIFA World Cup squad
- 1966 FIFA World Cup squad
- 1970 FIFA World Cup squad
- 1974 FIFA World Cup squad
- 1978 FIFA World Cup squad
- 1982 FIFA World Cup squad
- 1986 FIFA World Cup squad
- 1990 FIFA World Cup squad
- 1994 FIFA World Cup squad
- 1998 FIFA World Cup squad
- 2002 FIFA World Cup squad
- 2006 FIFA World Cup squad
- 2010 FIFA World Cup squad
- 2014 FIFA World Cup squad
- 2018 FIFA World Cup squad
- 2022 FIFA World Cup squad
- 2026 FIFA World Cup squad

UEFA European Championship squads

- UEFA Euro 1972 squad
- UEFA Euro 1976 squad
- UEFA Euro 1980 squad
- UEFA Euro 1984 squad
- UEFA Euro 1988 squad
- UEFA Euro 1992 squad
- UEFA Euro 1996 squad
- UEFA Euro 2000 squad
- UEFA Euro 2004 squad
- UEFA Euro 2008 squad
- UEFA Euro 2012 squad
- UEFA Euro 2016 squad
- UEFA Euro 2020 squad
- UEFA Euro 2024 squad

FIFA Confederations Cup squads

- 1999 FIFA Confederations Cup squad
- 2005 FIFA Confederations Cup squad
- 2017 FIFA Confederations Cup squad

== Managers ==
Manager	Period	Matches	Wins	Draws^{1}	Losses	Win %	Honours
DFB committee	1908–1926	58	16	12	30	27.59	
Otto Nerz	1926–1936	70	42	10	18	60.00	Third place at the 1934 World Cup
Sepp Herberger^{2}	1936–1942; 1950–1964	167	94	27	46	56.29	Winner of the 1954 World Cup, Fourth place at the 1958 World Cup
Helmut Schön	1964–1978	139	87	31	21	62.59	Runner-up of the 1966 World Cup, Third place at the 1970 World Cup, Winner of Euro 1972, Winner of the 1974 World Cup, Runner-up of Euro 1976
Jupp Derwall	1978–1984	67	44	12	11	65.67	Winner of Euro 1980, Runner-up of the 1982 World Cup
Franz Beckenbauer	1984–1990	66	34	20	12	51.52	Runner-up of the 1986 World Cup, Winner of the 1990 World Cup
Berti Vogts	1990–1998	102	66	24	12	64.71	Runner-up of Euro 1992, Winner of Euro 1996
Erich Ribbeck	1998–2000	24	10	6	8	41.67	
Rudi Völler	2000–2004	53	29	11	13	54.72	Runner-up of the 2002 World Cup
Jürgen Klinsmann	2004–2006	34	20	8	6	58.82	Third place at the 2005 Confederations Cup, Third place at the 2006 World Cup
Joachim Löw^{3}	2006–2021	198	124	40	34	62.63	Runner-up of Euro 2008, Third place at the 2010 World Cup, Third place of Euro 2012, Winner of the 2014 World Cup, Third place of Euro 2016, Winner of the 2017 Confederations Cup
Total^{3}		978	566	201	211	57.87	

Notes

1. Includes matches won or lost on penalty shoot-outs.
2. Record includes periods of pre-division Germany (1936–1942 – 70 matches: 42 wins, 13 draws, 15 losses) and West Germany (1950–1964 – 97 matches: 52 wins, 14 draws, 31 losses; no national team matches and no national coaches between 1942 and 1950).

== Players ==
=== Captains ===
This is the list of Germany captains since Germany's first participation in a World Cup in 1934 (current as of 23 November 2014).
Note: the column "matches" signifies overall matches as captain, not overall caps. East German captains are not included. Captained matches outside the player's main period are also included.

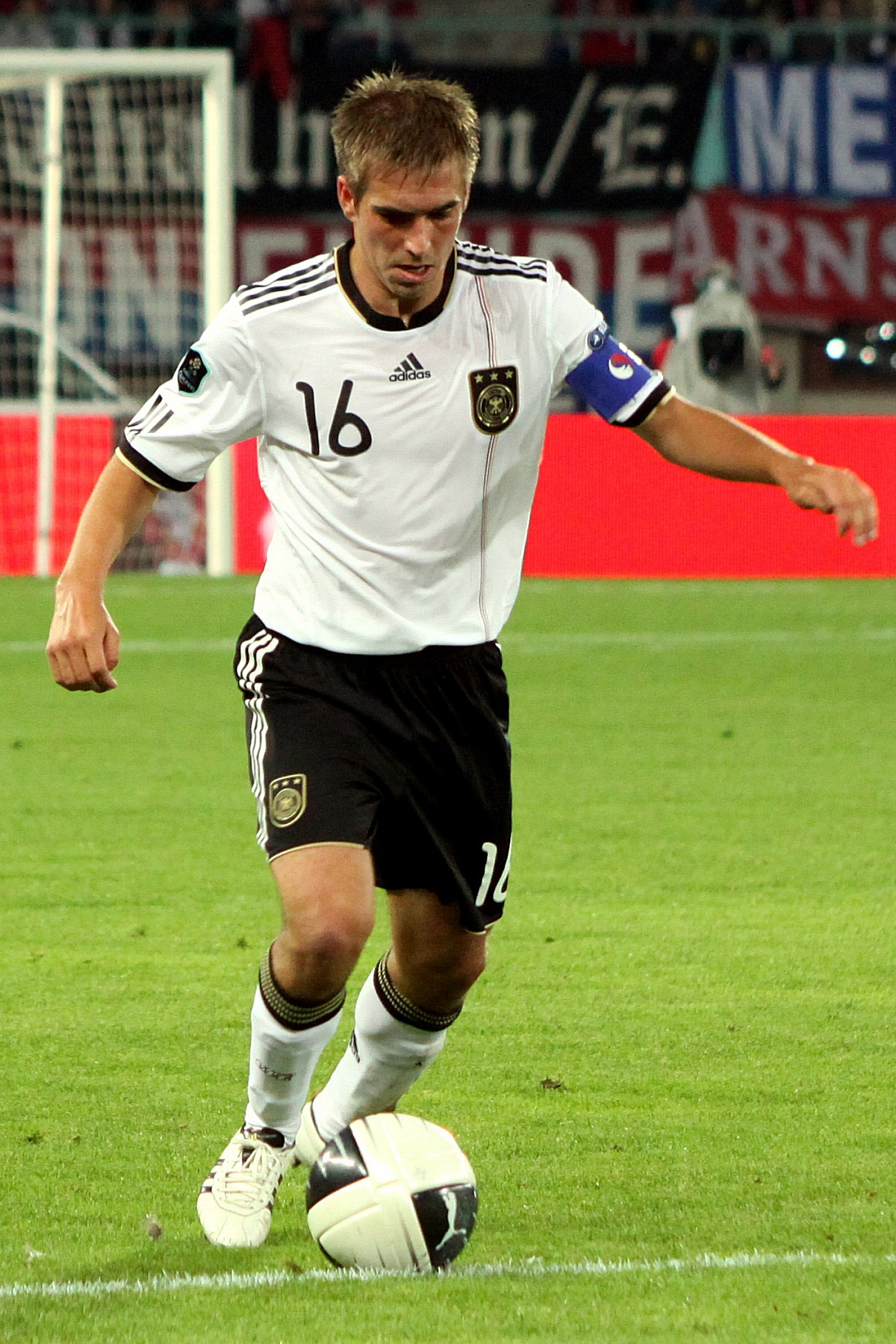
Philipp Lahm, former Germany national football team captain

Player	Period	Matches	Notes
Fritz Szepan	1934–1939	30	
Paul Janes	1939–1942	31	
Fritz Walter	1951–1956	30	Honorary captain
Hans Schäfer	1957–1962	16	
Helmut Rahn	1957–1959	8	
Herbert Erhardt	1959–1962	18	
Uwe Seeler	1961–1970	40	Honorary captain
Wolfgang Overath	1968–1971	14	
Franz Beckenbauer	1971–1977	50	Honorary captain
Berti Vogts	1977–1978	20	
Bernard Dietz	1978–1981	19	
Karl-Heinz Rummenigge	1980–1986	50	
Harald Schumacher	1984–1986	11	
Klaus Allofs	1986–1988	8	
Lothar Matthäus	1987–1999	72	Honorary captain
Jürgen Klinsmann	1995–1998	36	Honorary captain
Oliver Bierhoff	1998–2001	22	
Oliver Kahn	2000–2006	48	
Michael Ballack	2004–2010	54	
Philipp Lahm	2010–2014	51	
Bastian Schweinsteiger	2014–2016	13	
Manuel Neuer	2016–2024	21	
Joshua Kimmich	2024–present	0	

=== Tournament records ===
- Most World Cups played in: Lothar Matthäus and Manuel Neuer – 5
- Most World Cup match appearances: Lothar Matthäus – 25
- Most World Cup goals: Miroslav Klose – 16
- Most European Championship match appearances: Manuel Neuer – 20
- Most European Championship goals: Mario Gómez and Jürgen Klinsmann – 5
