= Rudolf Gellesch =

German footballer

Personal information
- Full name: Rudolf Gellesch
- Date of birth: 1 May 1914
- Place of birth: Gelsenkirchen, German Empire
- Date of death: 20 August 1990 (aged 76)
- Place of death: Kassel, West Germany
- Position: Forward

Senior career*
Years	Team	Apps	(Gls)
1926–1946	Schalke 04		
1946–1950	FC Lübbecke		
1950–1951	Eintracht Trier		

International career
1935–1941	Germany	21	(1)

Managerial career
- 1950–1952: Eintracht Trier
- 1952–1955: Hessen Kassel
- 1956: Auswahl Frankfurt
- 1957: Auswahl Frankfurt
- * Club domestic league appearances and goals

Rudolf Gellesch (1 May 1914 – 20 August 1990) was a German football forward. Gellesch played for FC Schalke 04 (1926–1946) and TuS Lübbecke (1946–1950).

On the national level he played for Germany national team (20 matches/1 goal), and was a participant at the 1938 FIFA World Cup. He was the inside right of the Breslau Eleven that beat Denmark 8–0 in 1937 and went on to win 10 out 11 games played during that year. He was also part of Germany's squad at the 1936 Summer Olympics, but he did not play in any matches.

Rudolf Gellesch replaced Fritz Szepan as inside forward for FC Schalke 04 during the 1930s, after Szepan moved to the center half position, playing in a style similar to Szepan.

== Selected filmography ==
- Das Grosse Spiel (1942)
