= Henry Appleton =

Henry Appleton may refer to:

- Henry Appleton (anarchist), 19th-century American individualist anarchist.
- Henry Appleton (captain), 17th-century English captain in the navy and commodore
- Sir Henry Appleton, 2nd Baronet (died 1649) of the Appleton baronets
- Sir Henry Appleton, 3rd Baronet (died 1670) of the Appleton baronets
- Sir Henry Appleton, 4th Baronet (died 1679) of the Appleton baronets
- Sir Henry Appleton, 6th Baronet (died 1708) of the Appleton baronets
- Henry Appleton, a character in the UK TV series Fallen Angel

== See also ==
- Appleton (disambiguation)
