= Poul L. Hansen =

Danish footballer (1916–2002)

Personal information
- Full name: Poul Laurits Hansen
- Date of birth: 5 February 1916
- Place of birth: Copenhagen, Denmark
- Date of death: 15 March 2002 (aged 86)
- Place of death: Gentofte, Denmark
- Position: Defender

Senior career*
Years	Team	Apps	(Gls)
1934–1948	B 93		

International career
1935–1946	Denmark	25	(0)
- * Club domestic league appearances and goals

Poul Laurits Hansen (5 February 1916 – 15 March 2002) was a Danish amateur footballer, who played 25 games for the Denmark national football team as a defender from November 1935 to September 1946. Born in Copenhagen, Hansen spent his club career with B 93. He died on 15 March 2002 in Gentofte.
