= Oscar Jørgensen =

Danish footballer

Oscar Erik Mammen Jørgensen (17 December 1909 – 21 May 1992) was a Danish amateur football player, who played 28 games for the Denmark national football team from 1932 to 1945. Born in Frederiksberg, Jørgensen played as a midfielder (center-half) for Copenhagen club KB. A tall, heavy-set, knock-kneed man, Jørgensen looked nothing like a sportsman. However, with deceptively good acceleration, anticipation and heading ability, he was a good defensive player.

Jørgensen made his international debut for Denmark in June 1932. The national team positioned the center-half differently from KB, and Jørgensen was played out of position as a defender. He was the defensive lynch-pin of the Danish team that lost the so-called Battle of Breslau game 0–8 to the Germany national football team. Following the Breslau game, Oscar Jørgensen was dropped from the team, but he returned within the year. He then replaced Pauli Jørgensen as team captain, and captained Denmark in his remaining 15 international games. Oscar Jørgensen played his last international game in September 1945. Years after his retirement, Jørgensen made a comeback for KB, playing in the center forward position.
