= Thomas Woodward (footballer) =

Welsh footballer

Personal information
- Full name: Thomas George Woodward
- Date of birth: 13 November 1900
- Place of birth: Troedyrhiw, Wales
- Date of death: 1981 (aged 80–81)
- Position: Winger

Senior career*
Years	Team	Apps	(Gls)
1919–1920	Troedyrhiw Stars		
1920–1921	Merthyr Thursdays		
1921–1922	Merthyr Town	0	(0)
1922–1923	Chesterfield	4	(0)
1923	Bridgend		
1923	Llanelly		
1924–1926	Preston North End	24	(1)
1926–1929	Swansea Town	59	(0)
1929–1930	Merthyr Town	35	(2)
1930	Llanelly		
1931	Taunton Town		
1932	Troedyrhiw		
Total		122	(3)
- * Club domestic league appearances and goals

Thomas George Woodward (13 November 1900 – 1981) was a Welsh footballer who played in the Football League for Chesterfield, Merthyr Town, Preston North End and Swansea Town.
