= Elliot Myles =

Welsh footballer (born 2007)

Personal information
- Full name: Elliot Jermaine Akinola Myles
- Date of birth: 20 January 2007 (age 19)
- Place of birth: Milton Keynes, England
- Height: 1.78 m (5 ft 10 in)
- Position: Attacking midfielder

Team information
- Current team: Norwich City
- Number: 44

Youth career
- 2021–2024: Norwich City

Senior career*
Years	Team	Apps	(Gls)
2024–	Norwich City	3	(0)

International career^{‡}
2021–2023	Wales U16	5	(3)
2022–2023	England U16	6	(0)
2023	England U17	3	(1)
2023–2024	Wales U17	14	(6)
2024	Wales U18	3	(0)
2024–	Wales U19	5	(1)
2026–	Wales U21	1	(0)
- * Club domestic league appearances and goals as of 13:29, 9 November 2025 (UTC) ‡ National team caps and goals as of 21:05, 31 March 2026 (UTC)

Elliot Jermaine Akinola Myles (born 20 January 2007) is a professional footballer who plays for EFL Championship club Norwich City as an attacking midfielder. He is a Wales Under-21 international.

== Club career ==
A youth product of Norwich City since the age of 14, Myles signed an academy contract with the club on 7 July 2023. He signed his first professional contract with the club on 23 January 2024. He made his senior and professional debut with Norwich as a substitute in a 4–3 EFL Cup win over Stevenage on 13 August 2024.

== International career ==
Myles is eligible to play for Wales, England, Ghana and Nigeria, and has played for England and Wales at youth level. In October 2021, Myles made his first international appearance with Wales U16s at the Victory Shield tournament. He made the squad for the Wales U17s at the 2024 UEFA European Under-17 Championship. In October 2024, he was called up to the Wales under-19s for a set of friendlies. In March 2026 he was called up to the Wales under-21 squad for the first time.
