= Appleton baronets =

Extinct baronetcy in the Baronetage of England

- Escutcheon of the Appleton baronets of South Benfleet
- Creation date: 1611
- Status: extinct
- Extinction date: 1708

The Appleton Baronetcy, of South Benfleet in the County of Essex, was a title in the Baronetage of England. It was created on 29 June 1611 for Roger Appleton. The title became extinct on the death of the sixth Baronet in 1708.

== Appleton baronets, of South Benfleet (1611) ==
- Sir Roger Appleton, 1st Baronet (died 1613)
- Sir Henry Appleton, 2nd Baronet (died 1649)
- Sir Henry Appleton, 3rd Baronet (died 1670)
- Sir Henry Appleton, 4th Baronet (died 1679)
- Sir William Appleton, 5th Baronet (c. 1630–1705)
- Sir Henry Appleton, 6th Baronet (died 1708)

Baronetage of England
Preceded by Baker baronets	Appleton baronets 29 June 1611	Succeeded by Sedley baronets
