= Agudelo (disambiguation) =

Agudelo grapes are a white variety of wine grape grown in northwestern Spain.

Agudelo is a surname. Notable people with the surname include:

- Agripina Samper Agudelo (1833—1892), Colombian poet
- Ana Paola Agudelo García (born 1983), Colombian economist and politician
- Carlos Calvo Agudelo (born 1994), Colombian artistic gymnast
- David Álvarez Agudelo (born 1992), Colombian footballer
- Fernando Gómez Agudelo (1931—1993), Colombian lawyer
- Graciela Agudelo (1945–2018), Mexican pianist and composer
- Hernando Agudelo Villa (1923–2010), Colombian lawyer and politician
- Iván Darío Agudelo (born 1967), Colombian lawyer and politician
- Jaime Agudelo (1925–2009), Colombian comedian and actor
- Jonathan Agudelo (born 1992), Colombian footballer
- José Antonio Agudelo Gómez (born 1959), Colombian racing cyclist
- José María Samper Agudelo (1828—1888), Colombian lawyer, politician, and writer
- Jose Ramirez Agudelo (born 1990), Colombian footballer
- Juan Agudelo (born 1992), Colombian-born American footballer
- Juan David Agudelo (born 1982), Colombian actor, TV host and model
- Kevin Agudelo (born 1998), Colombian footballer
- Luisa Agudelo (born 2007), Colombian footballer
- Miguel Samper Agudelo (1825–1899), Colombian lawyer, politician, and writer
- Milena Agudelo (born 1985), Colombian pole vault athlete
- Monica Castaño Agudelo (born 1989), Colombian beauty queen and model
- Óscar Agudelo (1932–2023), Colombian musician
- Pedro Nel Gómez Agudelo (1899–1984), Colombian engineer, painter, and sculptor
- Rafael Agudelo (born 1954), Colombian footballer

== See also ==
- Alcibiades Antonio Acosta Agudelo (a.k.a. Checo Acosta; born 1965), Colombian folk singer
- Jorge Iván del Valle (born Jorge Iván Agudelo; 1991), Colombian human rights activist
- Jown Cardona (full name Jown Anderson Cardona Agudelo; born 1995), Colombian footballer
- Juan Fernando Cobo (full name Juan Fernando Cobo Agudelo; 1959—2024), Colombian painter, illustrator, sculptor and cultural promoter
- Maria Richwine (born María Eugenia Agudelo; 1952–2024), Colombian-born American actress
- Agüero
- Agüera
