= Agüero (surname) =

Agüero or Aguero (Spanish pronunciation: [aˈɣweɾo]) is a Spanish and Aragonese toponymic surname from places named Agüero in the province of Huesca and in Cantabria.

Notable people with this name include:

- Aidachi Aguero (born 1999), Cuban volleyball player
- Alyssa Cruz Aguero (born 1988), Guamanian beauty pageant titleholder
- Andrés Rivero Agüero (1905–1997), Cuban politician
- Ariel Agüero (born 1980), Argentine footballer
- Arturo Agüero Chaves (1907–2001), Costa Rican poet and philologist
- Benito Manuel Agüero (1626–1668), Spanish painter
- Brenda Agüero (born 1995), Argentine serial killer
- Brígida Agüero (1837–1866), Cuban poet
- Caridad Agüero (born 1938), Cuban athlete
- Carolina Agüero (born 1975), Argentinian ballet dancer
- Curro Rivera Agüero (1951–2001), Mexican bullfighter
- Daniel Agüero (born 1997), Peruvian artistic gymnast
- Diego Agüero (born 1984), Paraguayan footballer
- Emiliano Agüero (born 1995), Argentine footballer
- Enrique de la Riva-Agüero y Riglos (1857–1930), Peruvian politician and diplomat
- Ezequiel Agüero (born 1994), Malaysian footballer
- Ernesto Aguero (born 1969), Cuban weightlifter
- Ezequiel Agüero (born 1994), Malaysian footballer
- Facundo Agüero (born 1995), Argentine footballer
- Fernando Agüero (1917–2011), Nicaraguan politician
- Francisco Agüero Velasco (1793–1826), Cuban revolutionary
- Gaspar Agüero Barreras (1873–1951), Cuban composer and educator
- Herme Medina Agüero (1944–2016), Paraguayan activist, poet, and musician
- Ignacio Agüero (born 1952), Chilean documentary filmmaker
- Ismael Esteban Agüero (born 1983), Spanish cyclist
- Jack Agüeros (1934–2014), American poet of Puerto Rican ancestry
- Joaquín de Agüero (1816–1851), Cuban revolutionary
- José Agüero (Brazilian tennis player) (born 1933), Brazilian tennis player of the 1950s
- José Agüero (Cuban tennis player), Cuban tennis player active between 1935 and 1952
- José Agüero (footballer), Spanish footballer
- José de la Riva Agüero (1783–1858), President of Peru in 1823
- José de la Riva-Agüero y Looz-Corswarem (1827–1881), Peruvian politician and diplomat
- José de la Riva-Agüero y Osma (1885–1944), Peruvian historian, writer and politician
- José Manuel Agüero Tovar (born 1971), Mexican politician
- José María Agüero (1947–2023), Costa Rican footballer
- Juan Bautista Agüero (1935–2018), Paraguayan footballer
- Juan Miguel de Agüero (died 1610), 16th-century Spanish architect
- Lucas Agüero (born 1997), Argentinian football player
- Lilianny Marsillan Agüero (born 1991), Cuban volleyball player
- María Dolores Agüero (born 1982), Honduran politician
- María Luisa Ávila Agüero (born 1961), Costa Rican politician
- Mario Aguero (basketball) (1924–2001), Cuban basketball player
- Mario Agüero (roller hockey) (1957–2025), Argentine roller hockey player
- Marta Agüero (born 1991), Paraguayan footballer
- Matías Agüero (born 1981), Italy international rugby union player
- Milciades Bautista Adorno Aguero (born 2005), Paraguayan footballer
- Mireya Agüero (born 1958), Honduran politician
- Pablo Agüero (born 1977), Argentine-French filmmaker
- Pedro Agüero (born 1948), Argentine boxer
- Pilar Agüero-Esparza (born 1966), Mexican-American painter
- Polita Grau de Agüero (1915–2000), First Lady of Cuba
- Rubén Agüero (born 1960), Argentine footballer
- Salvador Machado Agüero (1838–1925), President of Nicaragua, June-July 1893
- Sebastián Valenzuela Agüero (born 1977), Chilean politician
- Sergio Agüero (born 1988), Argentine footballer
- Silvia Agüero (born 1985), Spanish writer
- Susana Agüero (1944–2012), Argentine ballet dancer
- Taismary Agüero (born 1977), Italian volleyball player
- Zenón Noriega Agüero (1900–1957), Peruvian army general

== See also ==
- Agüero (disambiguation)
