= Fernando Gómez =

Fernando Gómez may refer to:

- Fernando Fernán Gómez (1921–2007), Spanish actor and director
- Fernando Gómez Agudelo (1931–1993), Colombian lawyer and television industry pioneer
- Fernando R. Gómez (born 1940), founder of the Museo de Historia del Mormonismo en Mexico
- Fernando Gómez Esparza (born 1953), Mexican politician
- Fernando Gomez-Bezares (born 1956), Spanish economist
- Fernando Gómez Mont (born 1963), Mexican lawyer and politician
- Fernando Gómez (footballer, born 1965), Spanish retired footballer
- Fernando Gómez-Reino (born 1965), Spanish former swimmer
- Fernando Gómez (athlete) (born 1965), Spanish Paralympic track and field athlete
- Nando Gómez (born 1984), Spanish footballer born Fernando Gómez Herrera
- Raúl Fernando Gómez Circunegui, Uruguayan man who survived a four-month ordeal in the Andes mountain-range

== See also ==
- Fernando Gomes (disambiguation)
