= Spain national football team results (unofficial matches) =

The Spain national football team has played in several matches dating back to 1913, which according to various sources are not counted as 'Tier A' international matches. In 2020, the sports newspaper Marca reported that there were 74 such matches, most of them either played during the Spanish Civil War era (late 1930s), charity fundraisers or pre-tournament warm-up matches against clubs or regional representative teams; of the 403 players involved in those matches, 89 were never capped in an official match.

== 1913 ==
25 May 1913 Friendly	Spain (RUECF)	1–1	France (USFSA)	Hondarribia, Gipuzkoa
16:30	Arzuaga 85' Eizaguirre; Arrate, Bello; Figueroa, Echeverría, Pombo; Angoso, Prada, Arzuaga, Elósegui, Minondo	Report	Eizaguirre 75' (o.g.) Chayriguès; Massip, Gamblin; Lhermitte, Barreau, Pellan; Niggli, Turcan, Devic, Fenouillière, Denis	Stadium: Estadio de Amute; Attendance: 5,000; Referee: José Ángel Berraondo (Spain)

== 1920 ==
This was a series of warm-up matches for the 1920 Summer Olympics, held in Antwerp, that were played by the Northern Spain.
The 25 players initially called up, plus other local players, were distributed between two teams: Probables vs Posibles (probable vs possible)

11 July 1920 Training match	Probables	0–2	Posibles	Vigo
		Report	Cruces; Vázquez	Stadium: Campo de Coia; Referee: Manuel Lemmel (Catalonia)

13 July 1920 Training match	Probables	4–0	Posibles	Vigo
	Vázquez; Paco González	Report		Stadium: Campo de Coia; Referee: Manuel Lemmel (Catalonia)

20 July 1920 Training match	Probables	2–0	Posibles	Bilbao
	Sesúmaga; Arabolaza	Report		Stadium: San Mamés Stadium; Referee: Cecilio Ibarreche (Basque Country)

25 or 27 July 1920 Training match	Probables	2–0	Posibles	Bilbao
	Matías; Arabolaza	Report		Stadium: San Mamés Stadium; Referee: Cecilio Ibarreche (Basque Country)

1 August 1920 Training match	Probables	3–1	Posibles	Irun
	Vázquez; Arabolaza; Acedo	Report	Martínez	Stadium: Estadio de Amute; Referee: Chopeitia (Basque Country)

8 August 1920 Training match	Probables	3–4	Posibles	Irun
	Pagaza 2'; Sesúmaga ??	Report	Vázquez (pen.) (pen.); Arrate ??	Stadium: Estadio de Amute; Referee: Chopeitia (Basque Country)

== 1924 ==
13 March 1924 Friendly	Catalonia	0–7	Spain	Barcelona, Catalonia
		Report	Zabala; Samitier; Carulla 0' (o.g.); Laca	Stadium: Camp de Les Corts; Referee: Josep Llovera (Catalonia)

== 1926 ==
26 December 1926 Unofficial friendly	Aragon	1–1	Spain	Zaragoza, Aragon
		Report		Stadium: Campo de la Torre de Bruil

== 1927 ==
In May 1927, Spain played a friendly against Portugal in Madrid on the same day as they played Italy in Rome. The squad for the Italy game was more experienced and considered to be stronger, while several players in the Portugal match made their debuts; consequently the side that played Portugal is considered to have been equivalent to a Spain B team (although they won their match while the 'A team' lost theirs) and thus not a full international, although the match is included in some media articles relating to the Portugal–Spain football rivalry and in some statistical tallies of caps for the players involved (this is not included in Marca's 74 matches).

29 May 1927 Unofficial friendly	Spain XI	2–0	Portugal XI	(Spain) Madrid
17:30	Moraleda 61'; Valderrama 81'			Stadium: Metropolitano; Attendance: 30,000; Referee: (England) Thomas Crewe

== 1933 ==
28 February 1933 Unofficial friendly	Atlético Madrid	1–1	Spain

?? Unofficial friendly	Spain	1-0	Central European Club

?? Unofficial friendly	Castile	0-0	Spain

== 1934 ==
14 February 1934 Friendly	Catalonia	0–2	Spain	Barcelona, Catalonia
15:45		Report	Casuco 30'; Lángara 60'	Stadium: Camp de Les Corts; Referee: Arribas

14 May 1934 Unofficial friendly	Spain	3–3	Sunderland	Bilbao
		Report

15 May 1934 Unofficial friendly	Spain	1–1	Sunderland	Madrid
				Stadium: Chamartín

20 May 1934 Unofficial friendly	Spain	1–3	Sunderland	Valencia

== 1936 ==
8 January 1936 Unofficial friendly	ČAFC Židenice	1–2	Spain

== Civil War period ==
Following the outbreak of the Spanish Civil War in 1936, no official matches were played by Spain until 1941. The vast majority of the squad in 1936 either originated from the Basque provinces, or played for FC Barcelona in Catalonia, both of which were initially within Republican territory in the conflict. The Basque players formed their own quasi-national team and left Spain to play a long series of exhibition matches on tour around Eastern Europe and Latin America to provide funds and exposure for local causes, and Barcelona did likewise; most of the players in both groups never returned. Back in Spain, as the Nationalist side took control of more of the country, General Franco saw the opportunity to use football as a positive propaganda tool, and arranged for a match to be played in his home region of Galicia against Portugal, whose leader Salazar was supportive of Francoist Spain. Recognition was granted by FIFA at short notice and the match took place in Vigo in November 1937. In contrast to Portugal's settled squad, the Spain pool was hastily assembled from the best available players in Nationalist areas, and Portugal won for their first victory over their neighbours. A return match was arranged for the following January in Lisbon, also won by Portugal, and which attracted attention when three local players refused to give the Roman salute before kick-off; they were initially imprisoned, but were soon released due to the political influence held by the hierarchy of the club they played for, Belenenses. The matches are not considered official, but are included in some media articles relating to the rivalry and in some statistical tallies of caps for the players involved.

- The 1937 Workers' Summer Olympiad was the sixth edition of International Workers' Olympiads. The games were held from 25 July to 1 August at Antwerp in Belgium. They were originally planned for Barcelona 1936, but cancelled due to the outbreak of the Spanish Civil War. Spanish Republican workers participated in the football tournament of this Labour Olympiad.
- In February 1938, the Spain squad played further unofficial matches in North Africa (Ceuta, Tétouan and Melilla) against a team representing Spanish Morocco, to raise funds for the many local troops involved in the war.

=== 1937 ===
30 July 1937 International Workers' Olympiads QF	Belgium XI	0–2	Spanish Republic	Borgerhout, Belgium
		Report	Basilio Rodríguez; Alberto Sánchez	Stadium: Rivierenhof

31 July 1937 International Workers' Olympiads SF	Spanish Republic	2–1	Spartak Moscow	Deurne, Belgium
	Goal	Report	Lerma	Stadium: Bosuilstadion

31 August 1937 International Workers' Olympiads Bronze	Spanish Republic	1–0	Czechoslovakia XI	Borgerhout, Belgium
	Alberto Martorell	Report		Stadium: Rivierenhof

28 November 1937 Unofficial friendly	Spain XI	1–2	Portugal XI	Vigo, Galicia
	Gallart 76'		Pinga 59'; Valadas 75'	Stadium: Balaídos; Attendance: 50,000; Referee: (Italy) Rinaldo Barlassina

=== 1938 ===
2 January 1938 Unofficial friendly	Cádiz CF	1–5	Spain

6 January 1938 Unofficial friendly	Málaga Combined	1–3	Spain

9 January 1938 Unofficial friendly	Recreativo Granada	0–3	Spain

16 January 1938 Unofficial friendly	Seville XI	1–3	Spain

23 January 1938 Unofficial friendly	Seville XI	1–1	Spain

30 January 1938 Unofficial friendly	Portugal XI	1–0	Spain XI	Campo das Salésias, Lisbon
	Pinga 40'			Attendance: 25,000; Referee: (Italy) Francesco Mattea

6 February 1938 Unofficial friendly	Spanish Morocco	1–3	Spain	Estadio Municipal, Ceuta
	Ferre	Report	Vergara; Campanal I	Referee: Tovar

13 February 1938 Unofficial friendly	Spanish Morocco	2–5	Spain	La Hípica, Tétouan
	Tatono; Torrontegui	Report	Campanal I Epi; Vergara	Referee: Guerrero

20 February 1938 Unofficial friendly	Melilla XI	0–7	Spain	La Hípica, Melilla
		Report		Referee: Cesáreo González

== 1940 ==
5 May 1940 Unofficial friendly	Castile	1–2	Spain

== 1941 ==
6 December 1941 Unofficial friendly	Castile	4–1	Spain

18 December 1941 Unofficial friendly	Valencian Community	1–3	Spain

== 1947 ==
1 January 1947 Unofficial friendly	Spain	5–7	San Lorenzo de Almagro	Barcelona, Catalonia
	Herrerita 12'; Arza 14'; Escolà 51'; Langara 69'; Epi 88'		Pontoni 34', 35', 80', 86'; Martino 39', 72' de la Mata 89'	Stadium: Camp de Les Corts

16 January 1947 Unofficial friendly	Spain	1–6	San Lorenzo de Almagro	Madrid
	Escudero 88'		Farro 33', 49', 62'; Pontoni 36'; Zubieta 61' (pen.); Zubieta 61' (pen.); Silva 66'	Stadium: Metropolitano

19 October 1947 Friendly	Catalonia	3–1	Spain	Barcelona, Catalonia
16:00	César 11', 30'; Toni 67'	Report	Bilbao 2'	Stadium: Sarrià Stadium; Referee: Azón

== 1950 ==
In the run-up to the 1950 FIFA World Cup, Spain played two unofficial friendly matches against Mexico, minus the players taking part in the 1950 Copa del Generalísimo Final (including Athletic Bilbao's prolific goalscorer Zarra). Many of the locals were hostile to the Spanish political regime and the second match ended in controversy when the final whistle was blown as a shot which would have won the match for Spain was on its way to goal; Spanish supporters threw objects at the Mexican players as they left the field. The fallout was a major contributory factor in Asturias and Real Club España, two of the most successful teams in Mexican football and both with strong links to Spain, withdrawing from the professional ranks. A few weeks later, the touring Hungária team (made up of players who had defected from the communist regimes in Hungary and Czechoslovakia, led by Ladislao Kubala) played twice in Madrid against an approximation of the Spain World Cup squad, with the right-wing Franco government happy to co-operate with those fleeing from left-wing ideologies for political reasons.

26 May 1950 Friendly	Mexico XI	1–3	Spain XI	Mexico City
	Navarro 24'	Report	Juncosa 61'; César 65', 75'	Stadium: Estadio Ciudad de los Deportes

28 May 1950 Friendly	Mexico XI	0–0	Spain XI	Mexico City
		Report		Stadium: Estadio Ciudad de los Deportes; Referee: C. Esteva

8 June 1950 Friendly	Spain	1–2	Hungária	Madrid
	Igoa 15'	Report	Otto 10'; Marik 55'	Stadium: Estadio Metropolitano; Referee: R. Galende Pascual

14 June 1950 Friendly	Spain	6–3	Hungária	Madrid
	Zarra 5', 19', 25'; Gainza 20'; Marik (?); Juncosa (?)	Report	Kubala (?) 77'; Nagy 52'	Referee: N. De la Cruz Hernández

== 1951 ==
26 April 1951 Unofficial friendly	Spain	2–1	Stade de Reims

== 1952 ==
19 November 1952 Training match	Spain blue	3–1	Spain white	Madrid
	Marcet; Escudero; Basora		Arsuaga	Stadium: Chamartín

== 1953 ==
4 March 1953 Unofficial friendly	Spain	2–0	Karlsruher SC

28 October 1953 Unofficial friendly	Spain	2–0	FC La Chaux-de-Fonds

9 August 1953 Friendly	Catalonia	0–6	Spain	Barcelona
		Report		Referee: Azón

28 October 1953 Unofficial friendly	Spain	2–0	FC La Chaux-de-Fonds

9 December 1953 Unofficial friendly	Spain	6–0	Real Avilés	Zaragoza
	Artetxe; Pasieguito; Seguí; Miguel			Stadium: Estadio Torrero

16 December 1953 Unofficial friendly	Spain	5–1	Alavés	Valladolid
	Pasieguito 5'; Alsua 57', 71', 73', 87'	Report	Megino 68'	Stadium: José Zorrilla; Referee: Narciso Barrenechea

== 1955 ==
26 January 1955 Unofficial friendly	Spain	2–0	RFC Liégeois	Madrid
	Ramoní 38' (pen.); Buqué	Report		Stadium: Santiago Bernabéu; Attendance: 25,000; Referee: Marrón

== 1960 ==
21 December 1960 Unofficial friendly	Real Madrid	4–0	Spain	Madrid
20:30	Puskás 22' del Sol 33'; Di Stéfano 65'; Canário 76'			Stadium: Santiago Bernabéu; Referee: Manuel Asensi Martín

== 1962 ==
29 April 1962 Unofficial friendly	Spain	5–2	FC Saarbrücken	Madrid
	Ruiz Sosa 19'; Martínez 42'; Amancio 48'; Vergés 51'; Adelardo 74'		Vollmar 18', 34'	Stadium: Metropolitano

4 May 1962 Unofficial friendly	Spain	3–0	Stade Rennais	Bilbao
	Segarra 7'; Guillot 18'; Amancio 68'			Stadium: San Mamés

6 May 1962 Unofficial friendly	Spain	5–1	Stade Rennais	Bilbao
	Ruiz 4'; Di Stéfano 15', 65'; Segarra 17'; Puskás 87'		Hernas 81'	Stadium: San Mamés; Referee: Juan Gardeazábal

11 May 1962 Unofficial friendly	Spain	2–2	VfL Osnabrück	Bilbao
	Amancio 9', 73'		W. Bensmann 26'; Wiethe 70'	Stadium: San Mamés; Referee: Gómez Arribas

15 May 1962 Unofficial friendly	Spain	5–0	VfL Osnabrück	San Sebastián
	Di Stéfano; Adelardo; Martínez; Suárez			Stadium: Atotxa

17 May 1962 Unofficial friendly	Spain	5–1	Bayern Munich	Madrid
	del Sol 7'; Gento 55'; Puskás 58' (pen.), 71' (pen.), 79'		Sieber 81'	Stadium: Metropolitano

== 1964 ==
22 January 1964 Unofficial friendly	Spain	1–0	Koninklijke Beerschot

== 1965 ==
14 March 1965 Unofficial friendly	Spain	2–3	Meidericher SV	Seville
	Aragonés 44', 68'	Report	Krämer 6'; Nolden 25' (pen.); Schmidt 80'	Stadium: Ramón Sánchez-Pizjuán; Referee: R. Casasola

31 March 1965 Unofficial friendly	Spain	2–1	Standard Liège	Madrid
	Adelardo 39', 51'	Report	Claessen 75'	Stadium: Metropolitano; Attendance: 25,000; Referee: Pardo Hidalgo

7 April 1965 Unofficial friendly	Spain	3–1	Derry City Football Club	Madrid
	Luis Aragonés 5'; Ufarte 9'; Adelardo 30'	Report	Wilson 56'	Stadium: Metropolitano; Referee: Álvarez Martínez

27 April 1965 Unofficial friendly	Spain	6–0	Girondins de Bordeaux

== 1966 ==
14 March 1966 Unofficial friendly	Spain	6–1	Sint-Truidense VV	Zaragoza
	Fusté 10'; Marcelino 42', 81'; Adelardo 60'; Violeta 72'; Carlos Lapetra 87'		Leender 47'	Stadium: La Romareda; Referee: Adolfo Bueno Perales

12 June 1966 Unofficial friendly	Spain	1–2	AFC Ajax	A Coruña
	Zaldúa 75'		Johan Cruyff 5'; Co Prins 55'	Stadium: Riazor; Referee: (France) Mr. Kitabdijan

29 June 1966 Unofficial friendly	Spain	5–0	Wiener Sport-Club	Pontevedra
	Gento (?); Amancio; Pirri del Sol			Stadium: Estadio de Pasarón

== 1967 ==
14 June 1967 Unofficial friendly	Atlético Madrid	0–2	Spain	Madrid
		Report	Vavá II	Stadium: Manzanares

27 September 1967 Ricardo Zamora testimonial	Spain	0–3	Europe XI	Madrid
		Report	Mazzola 22'; Eusébio 28'; Goyvaerts 88'	Stadium: Santiago Bernabéu; Attendance: 50,000; Referee: José María Ortiz de Mendíbil

== 1970 ==
21 January 1970 Unofficial friendly	Spain	1–0	Hannover 96	Madrid
	Aragonés 57'			Stadium: Santiago Bernabéu; Attendance: 55,000; Referee: Antonio Camacho

== 1977 ==
5 October 1977 Unofficial friendly	Spain	5–1	North Rhine-Westphalia XI	Madrid
	Pirri 38'; Churruca 44'; Dani 48', 80'; Satrústegi 72'	Report	Worm 29'	Stadium: Estadio Vicente Calderón; Attendance: 30,000; Referee: Soto Montesino

== 1981 ==
15 May 1981 Pirri farewell match	Real Madrid	1–1	Spain	Madrid
20:45	Cunningham 15'	Report	Joaquín 55'	Stadium: Santiago Bernabéu; Attendance: 80,000; Referee: Augusto Lamo Castillo (Spain)

26 June 1981 Asensi & Pirri farewell match	Club Puebla	2–1	Spain	Puebla
14:00	Cabezas 32'; Pirri 37'	Report	Morán 83'	Stadium: Estadio Cuauhtémoc; Attendance: 20,000; Referee: Edward Bellion (United States)

== 1985 ==
16 October 1985 Training match	Spain red	1–2	Spain blue	Madrid
	Rincón 70'	Report	Ramón Calderé 28'; Eloy 76'	Stadium: Vicente Calderón Stadium; Attendance: 7,000; Referee: Morales Manrique

== 1988 ==
28 December 1988 José Manuel Alvelo charity match	Celta de Vigo	1–2	Spain	Vigo
	Amarildo 59' (pen.)	Report	Robert 18'; Martín Vázquez 26'	Stadium: Balaídos; Attendance: 25,000; Referee: Joaquín Ramos Marcos

== 1990 ==
11 April 1990 Unofficial friendly	Spain	3–1	Association of Spanish Footballers	Las Palmas
19:00	Butragueño 22'; Miñambres 62', 73'	Report	Bossio 83'	Stadium: Estadio Insular; Attendance: 10,000; Referee: Merino González

2 June 1990 Unofficial friendly	Fontanafredda	2–8	Spain	Fontanafredda
19:00		Report	Martín Vázquez X3; Roberto X2; Míchel X2; Butragueño	Stadium: Stadio Omero Tognon

3 June 1990 Unofficial friendly	ASD Sevegliano	1–6	Spain	Sevegliano
19:00		Report	Salinas X3; Bakero; Pardeza; Fernando	Stadium: Campo di via Vittorio Veneto

== 2003 ==
After the cancellation of the friendly against Mexico in New Jersey, a new match was organized by Iñaki Sáez.

20 August 2003 Training match	Spain red	2–0	Spain white and blue	Las Rozas de Madrid
	Etxeberria 10', 70'	Report		Stadium: La Ciudad del Fútbol; Attendance: 2,500; Referee: Carlos Megía Dávila

== 2013 ==
A friendly match between Equatorial Guinea and Spain in November 2013 was declared void by FIFA a month later due to a procedural error in confirming the use of a local referee. However, the RFEF includes the match and player statistics in its records, and these are usually counted in other sources (e.g. Juanfran Torres scored his only international goal in the fixture). Therefore, this match is included in the 2010–19 results and overall head-to-head record lists.

16 November Friendly (Note: The game between Equatorial Guinea and Spain in November 2013 was declared void by FIFA a month later due to a procedural error in confirming the use of a local referee. However, the RFEF includes the match and player statistics in its records, and these are usually counted in other sources (e.g. Juanfran Torres scored his only international goal in the fixture).)	Equatorial Guinea	1–2	Spain	Malabo
22.00	Bermúdez 36'	Report	Cazorla 13'; Juanfran 42'	Stadium: Estadio de Malabo; Attendance: 13,500; Referee: Joaquín Ela Esono (Equatorial Guinea)

20 November 2013, FIFA declares South Africa-Spain match (19 November 2013) invalid for the purposes of ranking due to the Spanish team making one more change than allowed. However, some days before FIFA confirms South Africa's friendly win over Spain FIFA have taken into account that both teams had agreed on the conditions of the match and submitted the necessary documentation prior to the match in order for FIFA to confirm it as an ‘A’ international.

19 November Friendly	South Africa	1–0	Spain	Johannesburg
20.00	Parker 56'	Report		Stadium: Soccer City; Attendance: 36,000; Referee: Osiase Koto (Lesotho)

== 2022 ==
The match between Jordan and Spain on 17 November did not count as an official friendly. The reason for that was because the Spanish FA and FIFA had agreed to increase the number of substitutions each team could make so that Spain's players was fresh for the start of the FIFA World Cup 2022 (whose opening occurred on November 20).

17 November 2022 Friendly	Jordan	1–3	Spain	Amman
19:00 UTC+3	Al-Dardour 90+2'	Report	Fati 12'; Gavi 55'; Williams 84'	Stadium: Amman International Stadium; Referee: Ahmed Al-Kaf (Oman)

== See also ==
- Results in unofficial matches of the Spanish women's football team
