= Pedro Godoy =

Paraguayan footballer (born 1995)

Personal information
- Full name: Pedro Javier Godoy Agüero
- Date of birth: 28 June 1995 (age 31)
- Place of birth: Concepción, Paraguay
- Height: 1.66 m (5 ft 5 in)
- Position: Forward

Youth career
- 2007–2008: Atlético Tembetary
- 2008–2012: Espanyol
- 2012–2014: Barcelona

Senior career*
Years	Team	Apps	(Gls)
2014–2015	Olimpia	2	(0)
2015	→ Rubio Ñu (loan)	0	(0)
2016	Tacuary		
2017	Atlético Colegiales		
- Nanawa
- 29 de Setiembre
- 12 de Octubre

International career
2014	Paraguay U20		
- * Club domestic league appearances and goals

Pedro Javier Godoy Agüero (Note: In this name that follows Hispanic American naming customs, the first or paternal surname is Godoy and the second or maternal family name is Agüero.) (born 28 June 1995) is a Paraguayan footballer who plays as a forward.

== Club career ==
Born in Concepción, Paraguay, Godoy began his career with Atlético Tembetary, before moving to Spain in 2008 to sign for Espanyol. After his release in July 2012, he attracted offers from numerous Spanish sides, and was close to signing with Málaga, but ultimately decided to join Barcelona. While at Barcelona, he trained with the first team on numerous occasions.

His contract with Barcelona expired on 30 June 2014, and a month later he returned to Paraguay to sign for Olimpia. After two appearances for Olimpia, he was loaned to Rubio Ñu in 2015.

After leaving Olimpia, Godoy played for Tacuary FBC and Atlético Colegiales, and was playing at Nanawa in Concepción in 2019. He also featured for 29 de Setiembre in 2019.

By 2021, he was playing for 12 de Octubre.

== International career ==
Godoy was called up to the Paraguay national under-20 football team in June 2014.

== Style of play ==
Standing at 1.66 m, Godoy drew comparisons with Argentine Sergio Agüero for his explosiveness in tight spaces and shooting ability.

== Career statistics ==
=== Club ===
Club	Season	League			Cup		Other		Total	
Club	Season	Division	Apps	Goals	Apps	Goals	Apps	Goals	Apps	Goals
Olimpia	2014	Paraguayan Primera División	2	0	0	0	0	0	2	0
Olimpia	2015	Paraguayan Primera División	0	0	0	0	0	0	0	0
Olimpia	Total		2	0	0	0	0	0	2	0
Rubio Ñu (loan)	2015	Paraguayan Primera División	0	0	0	0	0	0	0	0
Career total			2	0	0	0	0	0	2	0
