= Fernando Gomes =

Fernando Gomes may refer to:

- Fernando Gomes (football administrator) (born 1952), president of the Portuguese Football Federation
- Fernando Gomes (sport shooter) (born 1954), Brazilian sport shooter
- Fernando Gomes (Portuguese footballer) (1956–2022), football striker
- Fernando Gomes (Portuguese politician) (born 1946), Portuguese politician and former mayor of Porto
- Fernando Gomes (Bissau-Guinean politician) (born 1962), Guinea-Bissau's interior minister
- Fernando Gomes (footballer, born 1988), Brazilian football midfielder
- Fernando Gomes (Bissau-Guinean footballer) (born 2002), or Nito Gomes, football defender

== See also ==
- Fernando Gómez (disambiguation)
