= Juan José Ossa =

Chilean lawyer and politician

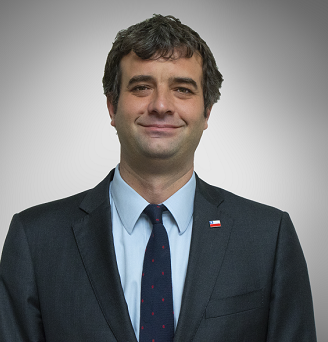
- Official portrait (2021)

Minister Secretary-General of the Presidency
- In office 6 January 2021 – 11 March 2022
- President: Sebastián Piñera
- Preceded by: Cristián Monckeberg
- Succeeded by: Giorgio Jackson

General Undersecretary of the Presidency
- In office 1 January 2020 – 6 January 2021
- Preceded by: Juan Francisco Galli
- Succeeded by: Maximo Pávez

Undersecretary of Justice
- In office 11 March 2018 – 1 January 2020
- Preceded by: Nicolás Mena Letelier
- Succeeded by: Sebastián Valenzuela Agüero

Personal details
- Born: 12 September 1979 (age 47) Santiago, Chile
- Party: Renovación Nacional
- Spouse: Carmen Lyon
- Children: Three
- Parent(s): Juan Luis Ossa; Lucía Santa Cruz
- Education: Pontifical Catholic University of Chile (LL.B); London School of Economics (M.D.)
- Occupation: Politician
- Profession: Lawyer

Juan José María Santa Cruz (born 12 September 1979) is a Chilean lawyer and politician. He served as the Ministry General Secretariat of the Presidency from 2021 to 2022.

In 2018, he was appointed by Sebastián Piñera as Undersecretary of Justice and in 2020 was appointed as General Undersecretariat of the Presidency.

== Early life and education ==
Ossa was born on September 12, 1979, in Santiago, Chile. He is the son of lawyer and former member of the Chamber of Deputies Juan Luis Ossa Bulnes and historian Lucía Santa Cruz Sutil.

Ossa earned his law degree from the Pontifical Catholic University of Chile and later completed a Master of Laws (LL.M.) at the London School of Economics and Political Science.

== Career ==
His professional career includes work as an associate lawyer at Carey y Cía. (2004–2006) and Bulnes, Pellegrini & Urrutia (2006–2007), as well as a period as a partner at Eyzaguirre, Burlé, Montes y Ossa Abogados (2017–2018). He has also taught civil law at the Faculty of Law of the Pontifical Catholic University of Chile.

A member of National Renewal, Ossa served as National Director of the National Consumer Service (SERNAC) from 2012 to 2014. Between 2014 and 2018, he was a member of the Disciplinary Tribunal of the National Professional Football Association (ANFP).

During the second government of Sebastián Piñera (2018–2022), he held several senior government positions, including Minister Secretary-General of the Presidency, Undersecretary of Justice, and Undersecretary General of the Presidency. He is a Director of the Centre for Public Policy at San Sebastián University.

In 2023, Ossa was appointed as expert commissioner of the Constitutional Council. Within the council, he serves as President of the Subcommittee on Political System, Constitutional Reform, and Form of State. His areas of expertise include consumer law, civil law, and competition law.

== Personal life ==
Ossa is married to Carmen Lyon, and they have three children.
