= Fernando Gomes (footballer, born 1988) =

Brazilian footballer (born 1988)

Fernando
Personal information
- Full name: Fernando Luis Gomes Guilherme
- Date of birth: January 6, 1988 (age 38)
- Place of birth: Fortaleza, Brazil
- Height: 1.77 m (5 ft 9 1/2 in)
- Position: Midfielder

Team information
- Current team: Mogi Mirim

Youth career
- 2004–2006: Internacional

Senior career*
Years	Team	Apps	(Gls)
2007	Internacional	5	(1)
2008	→ Vitória (Loan)	11	(0)
2009	Fortaleza	16	(0)
2009–2010	Treze	4	(0)
2011	Botafogo-SP		
2011–	Mogi Mirim		
2011	→ América-RN (Loan)		
- * Club domestic league appearances and goals

Fernando Luis Gomes Guilherme (born January 6, 1988, in Fortaleza), is a Brazilian footballer, who, as of 2011, plays for Mogi Mirim Esporte Clube.
