= Carolina Agüero =

Argentinian ballet dancer (born 1975)

- Born: 1975 (age 50–51); Córdoba, Argentina
- Education: Escuela de Ballet del Teatro Rivera Indarte
- Occupations: Ballerina; dance instructor
- Career
- Current group: Hamburg Ballet
- Former groups: Ballet of Córdoba; Ballet Argentino; Ballet of Santiago de Chile; Stuttgart Ballet; Dresden Semperoper Ballett; Finnish National Ballet
- Dances: Ballet

Carolina Agüero is an Argentinian ballerina, and a principal dancer with Hamburg Ballet in Hamburg, Germany.

== Early life ==
Carolina Agüero was born in 1975 in Córdoba, Argentina. She started Argentinian folkloric dancing classes at the age of three, and ballet when she was six years old and studied other dance styles including classical, Spanish, tap and jazz. At 13, she chose to focus on classical ballet.

== Career ==
She trained at the Escuela de Ballet del Teatro Rivera Indarte. As a professional ballerina, she has been a member of the ballet companies of Ballet of Córdoba, the Ballet Argentino, the Ballet of Santiago de Chile and, in Europe, the Stuttgart Ballet, Dresden Semperoper Ballett, the Finnish National Ballet, and finally the Hamburg Ballet, as soloist in 2006 and as first soloist since 2007.

Agüero also teaches ballet techniques, and has taught Argentine tango in New York City, and classical ballet in Argentina.

== Awards ==
Agüero won the Edvard Fazer Prize in Finland in 2004, and the Konex Prize, in Argentina, in 2009.

== Personal life ==
She is married, with a daughter.
