= Raúl Fernando Gómez Circunegui =

Uruguayan man

Raúl Fernando Gómez Circunegui is an Uruguayan man who survived a four-month ordeal in the Andes mountain-range. Gómez become known through international media when he was found alive at a shelter 2,840 meters above sea-level in San Juan province Argentina on 8 September 2013, having survived four months by consuming mainly rats and raisins. By the time he was found he had lost 20 kg and was malnourished as well as dehydrated. He had been reported missing since May, 2013.

== Biography ==
Raúl Fernando Gómez Circunegui was born in Bella Unión, Uruguay. He works as a plumber.
