= Spain national football team results (2010–2019) =

These are all the matches played by the Spain national football team between 2010 and 2019:

== Meaning ==
| | Meaning |
|---|---|
| W.C. | FIFA World Cup |
| EURO | UEFA European Championship |
| C.C. | FIFA Confederations Cup |
| U.N.L. | UEFA Nations League |
| Q | Qualification rounds |
| GS | Group stage |
| R16 | Round of 16 |
| QF | Quarter-finals |
| SF | Semi-finals |
| F | Final |

== Results ==
=== 2010 ===
17 matches played:

| 3 March Friendly | France | 0–2 | Spain | (France) Saint-Denis |
| 21:00 CET | | Report | Villa 21'; Ramos 46' | Stadium: Stade de France; Attendance: 79,021; Referee: (Scotland) Craig Thomson |

| 29 May Friendly | Spain | 3–2 | Saudi Arabia | (Austria) Innsbruck |
| 18:00 CEST | Villa 30'; Alonso 58'; Llorente 90+2' | Report | Hawsawi 16'; Al-Sahlawi 74' | Stadium: Tivoli Neu; Attendance: 7,500; Referee: (Austria) Thomas Einwaller |

| 3 June Friendly | Spain | 1–0 | South Korea | (Austria) Innsbruck |
| 18:00 CEST | Navas 85' | Report | | Stadium: Tivoli Neu; Attendance: 17,000; Referee: (Austria) Robert Schörgenhofer |

| 8 June Friendly | Spain | 6–0 | Poland | (Spain) Murcia |
| 22:00 CEST | Villa 12'; Silva 14'; Alonso 51'; Fàbregas 57'; Torres 75'; Pedro 80' | Report | | Stadium: Nueva Condomina; Attendance: 30,000; Referee: (Greece) Michail Koukoulakis |

==== 2010 FIFA World Cup ====
===== Group stage =====
| 16 June (South Africa) Fixture 1 | Spain | 0–1 | Switzerland | (South Africa) Durban |
| 16:00 CEST | | Report | Fernandes 52' | Stadium: Moses Mabhida; Attendance: 62,453; Referee: (England) Howard Webb |

| 21 June (South Africa) Fixture 2 | Spain | 2–0 | Honduras | (South Africa) Johannesburg |
| 20:30 CEST | Villa 17', 51' | Report | | Stadium: Ellis Park; Attendance: 54,386; Referee: (Japan) Yuichi Nishimura |

| 25 June (South Africa) Fixture 3 | Chile | 1–2 | Spain | (South Africa) Pretoria |
| 20:30 CEST | Millar 47' | Report | Villa 24'; Iniesta 37' | Stadium: Loftus Versfeld; Attendance: 41,958; Referee: (Mexico) Marco Rodríguez |

===== Knockout phase =====
| 29 June (South Africa) Round of 16 | Spain | 1–0 | Portugal | (South Africa) Cape Town |
| 20:30 CEST | Villa 63'; Xabi Alonso (yellow card) 74' | Report | Tiago (yellow card) 80'; Costa (red card) 89' | Stadium: Green Point; Attendance: 62,955; Referee: (Argentina) Héctor Baldassi |

| 3 July (South Africa) Quarter-final | Paraguay | 0–1 | Spain | (South Africa) Johannesburg |
| 20:30 CEST | Alcaraz (yellow card) 59'; Cáceres (yellow card) 59'; Morel (yellow card) 71'; Santana (yellow card) 88' | Report | Piqué (yellow card) 57'; Busquets (yellow card) 63'; Villa 83' | Stadium: Ellis Park; Attendance: 55,359; Referee: (Guatemala) Carlos Batres |

| 7 July (South Africa) Semi-final | Germany | 0–1 | Spain | (South Africa) Durban |
| 20:30 CEST | | Report | Puyol 73' | Stadium: Moses Mabhida; Attendance: 60,960; Referee: (Hungary) Viktor Kassai |

| 11 July (South Africa) Final | Netherlands | 0–1 (a.e.t.) | Spain | (South Africa) Johannesburg |
| 20:30 CEST | van Persie (yellow card) 15' van Bommel (yellow card) 22' de Jong (yellow card) 28' van Bronckhorst (yellow card) 54'; Heitinga (yellow card) 57' (yellow-red card) 109'; Robben (yellow card) 84' van der Wiel (yellow card) 111'; Mathijsen (yellow card) 117' | Report | Puyol (yellow card) 16'; Ramos (yellow card) 23'; Capdevila (yellow card) 67'; Iniesta 116' (yellow card) 118'; Xavi (yellow card) 120+1' | Stadium: Soccer City; Attendance: 84,490; Referee: (England) Howard Webb |

| 11 August Friendly | Mexico | 1–1 | Spain | Mexico City |
| 22:00 CEST; 15:00 Local time | Hernández 11' | Report | Silva 90+1' | Stadium: Azteca; Attendance: 105,000; Referee: (Panama) Roberto Moreno |

| 3 September (Poland) (Ukraine) 2012 EURO Q | Liechtenstein | 0–4 | Spain | (Liechtenstein) Vaduz |
| 20:45 CEST | | Report | Torres 19', 54'; Villa 27'; Silva 62' | Stadium: Rheinpark; Attendance: 6,127; Referee: (Turkey) Bülent Yıldırım |

| 7 September Friendly | Argentina | 4–1 | Spain | (Argentina) Buenos Aires |
| 22:00 CEST; 17:00 Local time | Messi 10'; Higuaín 13'; Tevez 34'; Agüero 90+1' | Report | Llorente 84' | Stadium: Monumental; Attendance: 65,000; Referee: (Colombia) Óscar Ruiz |

| 8 October (Poland) (Ukraine) 2012 EURO Q | Spain | 3–1 | Lithuania | (Spain) Villares de la Reina |
| 22:00 CEST | Llorente 47', 56'; Silva 79' | Report | Šernas 54' | Stadium: El Helmántico; Attendance: 16,800; Referee: (Italy) Gianluca Rocchi |

| 12 October (Poland) (Ukraine) 2012 EURO Q | Scotland | 2–3 | Spain | (Scotland) Glasgow |
| 21:00 CEST; 20:00 Local time | Naismith 58'; Piqué 67' (o.g.) | Report | Villa 44' (pen.); Iniesta 55'; Llorente 79' | Stadium: Hampden Park; Attendance: 51,322; Referee: (Switzerland) Massimo Busacca |

| 17 November Friendly | Portugal | 4–0 | Spain | (Portugal) Lisbon |
| 22:00 CET; 21:00 Local time | Martins 45'; Ramos 49' (o.g.); Postiga 68'; Almeida 90+2' | Report | | Stadium: Estádio da Luz; Attendance: 38,000; Referee: (France) Antony Gautier |

=== 2011 ===
12 matches played:

| 9 February Friendly | Spain | 1–0 | Colombia | (Spain) Madrid |
| 21:30 CET | Silva 85' | Report | | Stadium: Santiago Bernabéu; Attendance: 70,000; Referee: (Slovakia) Richard Trutz |

| 25 March (Poland) (Ukraine) 2012 EURO Q | Spain | 2–1 | Czech Republic | (Spain) Granada |
| 22:00 CET | Villa 69', 73' (pen.) | Report | Plašil 29' | Stadium: Nuevo Los Cármenes; Attendance: 16,400; Referee: (Hungary) Viktor Kassai |

| 29 March (Poland) (Ukraine) 2012 EURO Q | Lithuania | 1–3 | Spain | (Lithuania) Kaunas |
| 20:45 CEST; 21:45 Local time | Stankevičius 57' | Report | Xavi 19'; Kijanskas 70' (o.g.); Mata 83' | Stadium: Steponas Darius & Stasys Girėnas; Attendance: 9,180; Referee: (France) Laurent Duhamel |

| 4 June Friendly | United States | 0–4 | Spain | (United States) Foxborough |
| 22:41 CEST; 16:41 Local time | | Report | Cazorla 27', 41'; Negredo 32'; Torres 73' | Stadium: Gillette Stadium; Attendance: 64,121; Referee: (Uruguay) Roberto Silvera |

| 7 June Friendly | Venezuela | 0–3 | Spain | (Venezuela) Puerto la Cruz |
| 22:30 CEST; 16:00 Local time | Report | | Villa 5'; Pedro 20'; Alonso 45' | Stadium: Luis Ramos; Attendance: 36,000; Referee: (Peru) Georges Buckley |

| 10 August Friendly | Italy | 2–1 | Spain | (Italy) Bari |
| 20:45 CEST | Montolivo 11'; Aquilani 84' | Report | Alonso 37' (pen.) | Stadium: San Nicola; Attendance: 50,000; Referee: (Germany) Felix Brych |

| 2 September Friendly | Spain | 3–2 | Chile | (Switzerland) Saint Gallen |
| 20:45 CEST | Iniesta 54'; Fàbregas 70', 90' | Report | Isla 10'; Vargas 20' | Stadium: AFG Arena; Attendance: 14,605; Referee: (Switzerland) Jérôme Laperrière |

| 6 September (Poland) (Ukraine) 2012 EURO Q | Spain | 6–0 | Liechtenstein | (Spain) Logroño |
| 22:00 CEST | Negredo 34', 37'; Xavi 44'; Ramos 52'; Villa 60', 79' | Report | | Stadium: Nuevo Las Gaunas; Attendance: 16,000; Referee: (Austria) Harald Lechner |

| 7 October (Poland) (Ukraine) 2012 EURO Q | Czech Republic | 0–2 | Spain | (Czech Republic) Prague |
| 20:45 CEST | | Report | Mata 7'; Alonso 23' | Stadium: Generali Arena; Attendance: 17,873; Referee: (Italy) Paolo Tagliavento |

| 11 October (Poland) (Ukraine) 2012 EURO Q | Spain | 3–1 | Scotland | (Spain) Alicante |
| 20:45 CEST | Silva 6', 44'; Villa 54' | Report | Goodwillie 66' (pen.) | Stadium: Estadio José Rico Pérez; Attendance: 24,896; Referee: (Sweden) Stefan Johannesson |

| 12 November Friendly | England | 1–0 | Spain | (England) London |
| 18:15 CET; 17:15 Local time | Lampard 49' | Report | | Stadium: Wembley Stadium; Attendance: 87,189; Referee: (Belgium) Frank de Bleeckere |

| 15 November Friendly | Costa Rica | 2–2 | Spain | (Costa Rica) San José |
| 22:05 CET; 15:05 Local time | Brenes 31'; Campbell 41' | Report | Silva 83'; Villa 90+1' | Stadium: Nacional de Costa Rica; Attendance: 30,000; Referee: (Canada) Mauricio Navarro |

=== 2012 ===
16 matches played:

| 29 February Friendly | Spain | 5–0 | Venezuela | (Spain) Málaga |
| 21:30 CET | Iniesta 37'; Silva 40'; Soldado 49', 54', 84' | | | Stadium: La Rosaleda; Attendance: 25,000; Referee: (Latvia) Andris Treimanis |

| 26 May Friendly | Serbia | 0–2 | Spain | (Switzerland) Saint Gallen |
| 18:00 CEST | | | Adrián 64'; Cazorla 74' (pen.) | Stadium: AFG Arena; Attendance: 15,625; Referee: (Switzerland) Cyril Zimmermann |

| 30 May Friendly | Spain | 4–1 | South Korea | (Switzerland) Bern |
| 20:00 CEST | Torres 11'; Alonso 52' (pen.); Cazorla 56'; Negredo 80' | | D. H. Kim 43' | Stadium: Stade de Suisse; Attendance: 10,220; Referee: (Switzerland) Alain Bieri |

| 3 June Friendly | Spain | 1–0 | China | (Spain) Seville |
| 22:00 CEST | Silva 85' | | | Stadium: La Cartuja; Attendance: 45,000; Referee: (Netherlands) Bas Nijhuis |

==== UEFA Euro 2012 ====
| 10 June (Poland) (Ukraine) 2012 EURO GS | Spain | 1–1 | Italy | (Poland) Gdańsk |
| 18:00 CEST | Fàbregas 64' | Report | Di Natale 61' | Stadium: PGE Arena; Attendance: 38,869; Referee: (Hungary) Viktor Kassai |

| 14 June (Poland) (Ukraine) 2012 EURO GS | Spain | 4–0 | Republic of Ireland | (Poland) Gdańsk |
| 20:45 CEST | Torres 4', 70'; Silva 49'; Fàbregas 83' | Report | | Stadium: PGE Arena; Attendance: 39,150; Referee: (Portugal) Pedro Proença |

| 18 June (Poland) (Ukraine) 2012 EURO GS | Croatia | 0–1 | Spain | (Poland) Gdańsk |
| 20:45 CEST | | Report | Navas 88' | Stadium: PGE Arena; Attendance: 39,076; Referee: (Germany) Wolfgang Stark |

| 23 June (Poland) (Ukraine) 2012 EURO QF | Spain | 2–0 | France | (Ukraine) Donetsk |
| 20:45 CEST; 21:45 Local time | Alonso 19', 90+1' (pen.); Ramos (yellow card) 31' | Report | Cabaye (yellow card) 42'; Ménez (yellow card) 76' | Stadium: Donbas Arena; Attendance: 46,145; Referee: (Italy) Nicola Rizzoli |

| 27 June (Poland) (Ukraine) 2012 EURO SF | Portugal | 0–0 (a.e.t.) (2–4 p) | Spain | (Ukraine) Donetsk |
| 20:45 CEST; 21:45 Local time | Coentrão (yellow card) 45'; Pepe (yellow card) 61'; Pereira (yellow card) 64'; Alves (yellow card) 86'; Veloso (yellow card) 90+3' | Report | Ramos (yellow card) 40'; Busquets (yellow card) 60'; Arbeloa (yellow card) 84'; Alonso (yellow card) 113' | Stadium: Donbas Arena; Attendance: 48,000; Referee: (Turkey) Cüneyt Çakır |
| | Penalties |
| | Moutinho (penalty missed); Pepe (penalty scored); Nani (penalty scored); Alves (penalty missed) | | (penalty missed) Alonso; (penalty scored) Iniesta; (penalty scored) Piqué; (penalty scored) Ramos; (penalty scored) Fàbregas |

| 1 July (Poland) (Ukraine) 2012 EURO F | Spain | 4–0 | Italy | (Ukraine) Kyiv |
| 20:45 CEST; 21:45 Local time | Silva 14'; Piqué (yellow card) 25'; Alba 41'; Torres 84'; Mata 87' | Report | Barzagli (yellow card) 45' | Stadium: Olimpiyskiy; Attendance: 63,170; Referee: (Portugal) Pedro Proença |

| 15 August Friendly | Puerto Rico | 1–2 | Spain | (Puerto Rico) Bayamón |
| 22:30 CEST; 16:30 Local time | Cintron 65' | Report | Cazorla 42'; Fàbregas 45' | Stadium: Juan Ramón Loubriel; Attendance: 7,500; Referee: (Puerto Rico) Javier Santos |

| 7 September Friendly | Spain | 5–0 | Saudi Arabia | (Spain) Pontevedra |
| 22:00 CEST | Cazorla 22'; Pedro 28', 73'; Xavi 47'; Villa 63' (pen.) | Report | | Stadium: Nuevo Pasarón; Attendance: 11,850; Referee: (Azerbaijan) Anar Salmanov |

| 11 September (Brazil) 2014 W.C. Q | Georgia | 0–1 | Spain | (Georgia (country)) Tbilisi |
| 19:30 CEST; 21:30 Local time | | Report | Soldado 86' | Stadium: Boris Paichadze; Attendance: 54,598; Referee: (Norway) Svein Oddvar Moen |

| 12 October (Brazil) 2014 W.C. Q | Belarus | 0–4 | Spain | (Belarus) Minsk |
| 20:00 CEST; 21:00 Local time | | Report | Alba 12'; Pedro 21', 69', 72' | Stadium: Dinamo Stadium; Attendance: 30,000; Referee: (Belgium) Serge Gumienny |

| 16 October (Brazil) 2014 W.C. Q | Spain | 1–1 | France | (Spain) Madrid |
| 21:00 CEST | Ramos 25' | Report | Giroud 90+4' | Stadium: Vicente Calderón; Attendance: 46,145; Referee: (Germany) Felix Brych |

| 14 November Friendly | Panama | 1–5 | Spain | Panama City |
| 22:30 CET; 16:30 Local time | Gómez 87' (pen.) | Report | Pedro 16', 43'; Villa 30'; Ramos 82'; Susaeta 84' | Stadium: Estadio Rommel Fernández; Attendance: 26,000; Referee: (Mexico) Mauricio Morales |

=== 2013 ===
17 matches played:

| 6 February Friendly | Spain | 3–1 | Uruguay | (Qatar) Doha |
| 19:00 CET | Fàbregas 16'; Pedro 51', 74' | Report | C. Rodríguez 32' | Stadium: Khalifa International Stadium; Attendance: 48,000; Referee: Fahad Al-Marri (Qatar) |

| 22 March (Brazil) 2014 W.C. Q | Spain | 1–1 | Finland | (Spain) Gijón |
| 20:45 CET | Ramos 49' | | Pukki 79' | Stadium: El Molinón; Attendance: 27,637; Referee: Ovidiu Haţegan (Romania) |

| 26 March (Brazil) 2014 W.C. Q | France | 0–1 | Spain | (France) Saint-Denis |
| 21:00 CET | | Report | Pedro 58' | Stadium: Stade de France; Attendance: 78,329; Referee: Felix Brych (Germany) |

| 8 June Friendly | Spain | 2–1 | Haiti | (United States) Miami |
| 21:00 CET | Cazorla 8'; Fàbregas 19' | Report | Guerrier 75' | Stadium: Sun Life Stadium; Attendance: 36,535; Referee: Juan Guzmán (United States) |

| 11 June Friendly | Spain | 2–0 | Republic of Ireland | (United States) New York |
| 20:45 CET | Soldado 68'; Mata 88' | Report | | Stadium: Yankee Stadium; Attendance: 39,368; Referee: Jair Marrufo (United States) |

| 16 June (Brazil) 2013 C.C. GS | Spain | 2–1 | Uruguay | (Brazil) Recife |
| 19:00 UTC-3 | Pedro 20'; Soldado 32'; Piqué (yellow card) 36'; Arbeloa (yellow card) 71' | Report | Cavani (yellow card) 27'; Lugano (yellow card) 41'; Suárez 88' | Stadium: Arena Pernambuco; Attendance: 41,705; Referee: Yuchi Nishimura (Japan) |

| 20 June (Brazil) 2013 C.C. GS | Spain | 10–0 | Tahiti | (Brazil) Rio de Janeiro |
| 16:00 UTC-3 | Torres 5', 33', 57', 78'; Silva 31', 89'; Villa 39', 49', 64'; Cazorla (yellow card) 45'; Mata 66' | Report | | Stadium: Estádio do Maracanã; Attendance: 71,806; Referee: Djamel Haimoudi (Algeria) |

| 23 June (Brazil) 2013 C.C. GS | Nigeria | 0–3 | Spain | (Brazil) Fortaleza |
| 16:00 UTC-3 | | Report | Alba 3', 88'; Torres 62' | Stadium: Estádio Castelão; Attendance: 51,263; Referee: Joel Aguilar (El Salvador) |

| 27 June (Brazil) 2013 C.C. SF | Spain | 0–0 (7–6 p) | Italy | (Brazil) Fortaleza |
| 16:00 UTC-3 | Piqué (yellow card) 105+1' | Report | De Rossi (yellow card) 65' | Stadium: Estádio Castelão; Attendance: 56,083; Referee: Howard Webb (England) |
| | Penalties |
| | Xavi (penalty scored); Iniesta (penalty scored); Piqué (penalty scored); Ramos (penalty scored); Mata (penalty scored); Busquets (penalty scored); Navas (penalty scored) | | (penalty scored) Candreva; (penalty scored) Aquilani; (penalty scored) De Rossi; (penalty scored) Giovinco; (penalty scored) Pirlo; (penalty scored) Montolivo; (penalty missed) Bonucci |

| 30 June (Brazil) 2013 C.C. F | Brazil | 3–0 | Spain | (Brazil) Rio de Janeiro |
| 19:00 | Fred 2', 47'; Neymar 44' | Report | Arbeloa (yellow card) 15'; Ramos (yellow card) 28', (penalty missed) 52'; Piqué (red card) 68' | Stadium: Estádio do Maracanã; Attendance: 73,531; Referee: Björn Kuipers (Netherlands) |

| 14 August Friendly | Ecuador | 0–2 | Spain | (Ecuador) Guayaquil |
| 15.00 | | Report | Negredo 25'; Cazorla 63' | Stadium: Estadio Monumental; Attendance: 45,000; Referee: Wilmar Roldán (Colombia) |

| 6 September (Brazil) 2014 W.C. Q | Finland | 0–2 | Spain | (Finland) Helsinki |
| 21:30 UTC+3 | | Report | Alba 19'; Negredo 86' | Stadium: Helsingin Olympiastadion; Attendance: 37,492; Referee: Ivan Bebek (Croatia) |

| 10 September Friendly | Spain | 2–2 | Chile | (Switzerland) Geneva |
| 20:00 UTC+2 | Soldado 37'; Navas 90' | Report | Vargas 5', 44' | Stadium: Stade de Genève, Switzerland; Attendance: 15,635; Referee: Adrien Jaccottet (Switzerland) |

| 11 October (Brazil) 2014 W.C. Q | Spain | 2–1 | Belarus | (Spain) Palma de Mallorca |
| 22:00 UTC+2 | Xavi 61'; Negredo 78' | Report | Kornilenko 89' | Stadium: Iberostar Stadium; Attendance: 21,000; Referee: Bas Nijhuis (Netherlands) |

| 15 October (Brazil) 2014 W.C. Q | Spain | 2–0 | Georgia | (Spain) Albacete |
| 21:00 UTC+2 | Negredo 26'; Mata 61' | Report | | Stadium: Estadio Carlos Belmonte; Attendance: 16,133; Referee: Florian Meyer (Germany) |

| 16 November Friendly (Note: The game between Equatorial Guinea and Spain in November 2013 was declared void by FIFA a month later due to a procedural error in confirming the use of a local referee. However, the RFEF includes the match and player statistics in its records, and these are usually counted in other sources (e.g. Juanfran Torres scored his only international goal in the fixture).) | Equatorial Guinea | 1–2 | Spain | (Equatorial Guinea) Malabo |
| 22.00 | Bermúdez 36' | Report | Cazorla 13'; Juanfran 42' | Stadium: Estadio de Malabo; Attendance: 13,500; Referee: Joaquín Ela Esono (Equatorial Guinea) |

| 19 November Friendly | South Africa | 1–0 | Spain | (South Africa) Johannesburg |
| 20.00 | Parker 56' | Report | | Stadium: Soccer City; Attendance: 36,000; Referee: Osiase Koto (Lesotho) |

=== 2014 ===
12 matches played:

| 5 March Friendly | Spain | 1–0 | Italy | (Spain) Madrid |
| 20.00 | Pedro 63' | Report | | Stadium: Vicente Calderón Stadium; Attendance: 36,000; Referee: Yevheniy Aranovskyi (Ukraine) |

| 30 May Friendly | Spain | 2–0 | Bolivia | (Spain) Seville |
| 22.00 | Torres 50' (pen.); Iniesta 83' | Report | | Stadium: Ramón Sánchez Pizjuán Stadium; Attendance: 35,000; Referee: Lorenc Jemini (Albania) |

| 7 June Friendly | El Salvador | 0–2 | Spain | (United States) Washington, D.C. |
| 14:00 UTC-4 | | Report | Villa 60', 87' | Stadium: FedExField; Attendance: 50,000; Referee: Baldomero Toledo (United States) |

| 13 June (Brazil) 2014 W.C. GS | Spain | 1–5 | Netherlands | (Brazil) Salvador |
| 16:00 UTC-3 | Alonso 27' (pen.) | Report | Van Persie 44', 72'; Robben 53', 80'; De Vrij 65' | Stadium: Arena Fonte Nova; Attendance: 48,173; Referee: Nicola Rizzoli (Italy) |

| 18 June (Brazil) 2014 W.C. GS | Spain | 0–2 | Chile | (Brazil) Rio de Janeiro |
| 19:00 UTC-3 | | Report | Vargas 19'; Aránguiz 43' | Stadium: Estádio do Maracanã; Attendance: 74,101; Referee: Mark Geiger (United States) |

| 23 June (Brazil) 2014 W.C. GS | Australia | 0–3 | Spain | (Brazil) Curitiba |
| 13:00 UTC−3 | | Report | Villa 36'; Torres 69'; Mata 82' | Stadium: Arena da Baixada; Attendance: 39,375; Referee: Nawaf Shukralla (Bahrain) |

| 4 September Friendly | France | 1–0 | Spain | (France) Saint-Denis, Paris |
| TBD | Rémy 73' | | | Stadium: Stade de France; Attendance: 79,000; Referee: Alain Bieri (Switzerland) |

| 8 September (France) 2016 EURO Q | Spain | 5–1 | North Macedonia | (Spain) Valencia |
| 20:45 (UTC+2) | Ramos 16' (pen.); Alcácer 17'; Busquets 45+3'; Silva 50'; Pedro 90+1' | Report | Ibraimi 28' (pen.) | Stadium: Estadi Ciutat de València; Attendance: 18,553; Referee: Anastasios Sidiropoulos (Greece) |

| 9 October (France) 2016 EURO Q | Slovakia | 2–1 | Spain | (Slovakia) Žilina |
| 20:45 (UTC+2) | Kucka 17'; Stoch 87' | Report | 83' Alcácer | Stadium: Štadión pod Dubňom; Attendance: 9,478; Referee: Björn Kuipers (Netherlands) |

| 12 October (France) 2016 EURO Q | Luxembourg | 0–4 | Spain | Luxembourg |
| 20:45 (UTC+2) | | Report | Silva 27'; Alcácer 42'; Costa 69'; Bernat 88' | Stadium: Stade Josy Barthel; Attendance: 8,500; Referee: Paweł Gil (Poland) |

| 15 November (France) 2016 EURO Q | Spain | 3–0 | Belarus | (Spain) Huelva |
| 20:45 (UTC+1) | Isco 18'; Busquets 19'; Pedro 55' | Report | | Stadium: Estadio Nuevo Colombino; Attendance: 19,249; Referee: Kenn Hansen (Denmark) |

| 18 November Friendly | Spain | 0–1 | Germany | (Spain) Vigo |
| 20:45 CET (UTC+01:00) | | Report | Kroos 89' | Stadium: Balaídos; Attendance: 54,449; Referee: Mark Clattenburg (England) |

=== 2015 ===
9 matches played:

| 27 March (France) 2016 EURO Q | Spain | 1–0 | Ukraine | (Spain) Seville |
| 20:45 (UTC+1) | Morata 28' | Report | | Stadium: Ramón Sánchez Pizjuán; Attendance: 33,775; Referee: Cüneyt Çakır (Turkey) |

| 31 March Friendly | Netherlands | 2–0 | Spain | (Netherlands) Amsterdam |
| 20:45 (UTC+1) | De Vrij 13'; Klaassen 16' | Report | | Stadium: Amsterdam Arena; Attendance: 51,500; Referee: Willie Collum (Scotland) |

| 11 June Friendly | Spain | 2–1 | Costa Rica | (Spain) León |
| 22:00 (UTC+1) | Alcácer 8'; Fàbregas 30' | Report | Venegas 6' | Stadium: Reino de León; Attendance: 13,000; Referee: Domagoj Vučkov (Croatia) |

| 14 June (France) 2016 EURO Q | Belarus | 0–1 | Spain | (Belarus) Barysaw |
| 20:45 (UTC+3) | | Report | Silva 45' | Stadium: Borisov Arena; Attendance: 13,121; Referee: Robert Schörgenhofer (Austria) |

| 5 September (France) 2016 EURO Q | Spain | 2–0 | Slovakia | (Spain) Oviedo |
| 20:45 (UTC+2) | Alba 5'; Iniesta 30' (pen.) | Report | | Stadium: Carlos Tartiere; Attendance: 19,874; Referee: Damir Skomina (Slovenia) |

| 8 September (France) 2016 EURO Q | North Macedonia | 0–1 | Spain | (North Macedonia) Skopje |
| 20:45 (UTC+2) | | Report | Pačovski 8' (o.g.) | Stadium: Philip II Arena; Attendance: 28,843; Referee: Paolo Tagliavento (Italy) |

| 9 October (France) 2016 EURO Q | Spain | 4–0 | Luxembourg | (Spain) Logroño |
| 20:45 (UTC+2) | Cazorla 42', 85'; Alcácer 67', 80' | Report | | Stadium: Las Gaunas; Attendance: 14,472; Referee: Sébastien Delferière (Belgium) |

| 12 October (France) 2016 EURO Q | Ukraine | 0–1 | Spain | (Ukraine) Kyiv |
| 21:45 (UTC+3) | | Report | Mario 22' | Stadium: Olympic Stadium; Attendance: 61,248; Referee: Milorad Mažić (Serbia) |

| 13 November Friendly | Spain | 2–0 | England | (Spain) Alicante |
| 20:45 (UTC+2) | Mario 72'; Cazorla 84' | Report | | Stadium: José Rico Pérez; Attendance: 25,300; Referee: Paolo Mazzoleni (Italy) |

| 17 November Friendly | Belgium | canceled | Spain | (Belgium) Brussels |
| 20:45 (UTC+2) | | Report | | Stadium: King Baudouin Stadium |

=== 2016 ===
15 matches played:

| 24 March Friendly | Italy | 1–1 | Spain | Udine, Italy |
| 20:45 CET (UTC+01:00) | Insigne 68' | Report | Aduriz 70' | Stadium: Stadio Friuli; Attendance: 23,300; Referee: Deniz Aytekin (Germany) |

| 27 March Friendly | Romania | 0–0 | Spain | Cluj-Napoca, Romania |
| 20:45 CEST (UTC+02:00) | | Report | | Stadium: Cluj Arena; Attendance: 28,000; Referee: Ruddy Buquet (France) |

| 29 May Friendly | Spain | 3–1 | Bosnia and Herzegovina | St. Gallen, Switzerland |
| 18:00 CEST (UTC+02:00) | Nolito 11', 18'; Pedro 90+4' | Report | Spahić 30' | Stadium: AFG Arena; Attendance: 17,000; Referee: Stephan Klossner (Austria) |

| 1 June Friendly | Spain | 6–1 | South Korea | Salzburg, Austria |
| 16:30 CEST (UTC+02:00) | Silva 30'; Fàbregas 32'; Nolito 38', 54'; Morata 50', 89' | Report | Ju Se-jong 83' | Stadium: Red Bull Arena; Attendance: 31,800; Referee: Harald Lechner (Austria) |

| 7 June Friendly | Spain | 0–1 | Georgia | Getafe, Spain |
| 20:45 CEST (UTC+02:00) | | Report | Okriashvili 40' | Stadium: Coliseum Alfonso Pérez; Attendance: 14,650; Referee: Vilhjálmur Alvar Þórarinsson (Iceland) |

| 13 June (France) 2016 EURO GS | Spain | 1–0 | Czech Republic | Toulouse, France |
| 15:00 (CEST (UTC+02:00) | Piqué 87' | Report | | Stadium: Stadium Municipal; Attendance: 29,400; Referee: Szymon Marciniak (Poland) |

| 17 June (France) 2016 EURO GS | Spain | 3–0 | Turkey | Nice, France |
| 21:00 CEST (UTC+02:00) | Morata 34', 48'; Nolito 37' | Report | | Stadium: Allianz Riviera; Attendance: 33,409; Referee: Milorad Mažić (Serbia) |

| 21 June (France) 2016 EURO GS | Croatia | 2–1 | Spain | Bordeaux, France |
| 21:00 CEST (UTC+02:00) | N. Kalinić 45'; Perišić 87' | Report | Morata 7' | Stadium: Nouveau Stade de Bordeaux; Attendance: 37,245; Referee: Björn Kuipers (Netherlands) |

| 27 June (France) 2016 EURO R16 | Italy | 2–0 | Spain | Saint-Denis, France |
| 18:00 CEST (UTC+02:00) | Chiellini 33'; Pellè 90+1' | Report | | Stadium: Stade de France; Attendance: 76,165; Referee: Cüneyt Çakır (Turkey) |

| 1 September Friendly | Belgium | 0–2 | Spain | Brussels, Belgium |
| 20:45 CEST (UTC+02:00) | | Report | Silva 34', 62' (pen.) | Stadium: King Baudouin Stadium; Attendance: 28,000; Referee: Benoît Bastien (France) |

| 5 September (Russia) 2018 W.C. Q | Spain | 8–0 | Liechtenstein | Castile and León, Spain |
| 20:45 CEST (UTC+02:00) | Costa 10', 66'; Roberto 55'; Silva 59', 90+1'; Vitolo 60'; Morata 82', 83' | Report | | Stadium: Estadio Reino de León; Attendance: 11.000; Referee: Simon Lee Evans (Wales) |

| 6 October (Russia) 2018 W.C. Q | Italy | 1–1 | Spain | Turin, Italy |
| 20:45 CEST (UTC+02:00) | De Rossi 82' (pen.) | Report | Vitolo 55' | Stadium: Juventus Stadium; Attendance: 38.470; Referee: Felix Brych (Germany) |

| 9 October (Russia) 2018 W.C. Q | Albania | 0–2 | Spain | Shkodër, Albania |
| 20:45 CEST (UTC+02:00) | | Report | Costa 55'; Nolito 63' | Stadium: Loro Boriçi Stadium; Attendance: 15.900; Referee: Bas Nijhuis (Netherlands) |

| 12 November (Russia) 2018 W.C. Q | Spain | 4–0 | North Macedonia | Granada, Spain |
| 20:45 CET (UTC+01:00) | Velkovski 34' (o.g.); Vitolo 63'; Monreal 84'; Aduriz 85' | Report | | Stadium: Estadio Nuevo Los Cármenes; Attendance: 16.622; Referee: Robert Schörgenhofer (Austria) |

| 15 November Friendly | England | 2–2 | Spain | London, England |
| 21:00 CEST (UTC+02:00) | Lallana 9' (pen.); Vardy 48' | Report | Aspas 89'; Isco 90+6' | Stadium: Wembley Stadium; Attendance: 83.716; Referee: Ovidiu Hațegan (Romania) |

=== 2017 ===
10 matches played:

| 24 March (Russia) 2018 W.C. Q | Spain | 4–1 | Israel | Gijón, Spain |
| 20:45 CET (UTC+1) | Silva 13'; Vitolo 45+1'; Costa 51'; Isco 89' | Report (FIFA); Report (UEFA) | Rafaelov 76' | Stadium: Estadio El Molinon; Attendance: 30,000; Referee: Michael Oliver (England) |

| 28 March Friendly | France | 0–2 | Spain | Saint-Denis, France |
| 21:00 CEST (UTC+2) | | Report (UEFA) | Silva 68' (pen.); Deulofeu 77' | Stadium: Stade de France; Attendance: 76,419; Referee: Felix Zwayer (Germany) |

| 7 June Friendly | Spain | 2–2 | Colombia | Murcia, Spain |
| 20:30 (20:30 UTC+2) | Silva 22'; Morata 87' | Report (Goal.com) | Cardona 39'; Falcao 55' | Stadium: Nueva Condomina; Attendance: 31,179; Referee: Slavko Vinčić (Slovenia) |

| 11 June (Russia) 2018 W.C. Q | North Macedonia | 1–2 | Spain | Skopje, Macedonia |
| 20:45 CEST (UTC+2) | Ristovski 66' | Report (FIFA); Report (UEFA) | Silva 15'; Costa 27' | Stadium: Philip II Arena; Attendance: 20,675; Referee: Paweł Gil (Poland) |

| 2 September (Russia) 2018 W.C. Q | Spain | 3–0 | Italy | Madrid, Spain |
| 20:45 CEST (UTC+2) | Isco 14', 40'; Morata 77' | Report (FIFA); Report (UEFA) | | Stadium: Santiago Bernabéu; Attendance: 73,628; Referee: Björn Kuipers (Netherlands) |

| 5 September (Russia) 2018 W.C. Q | Liechtenstein | 0–8 | Spain | Vaduz, Liechtenstein |
| 20:45 CEST (UTC+2) | | Report (FIFA); Report (UEFA) | Ramos 3'; Morata 15', 54'; Isco 16'; Silva 39'; Aspas 51', 63'; Göppel 89' (o.g.) | Stadium: Rheinpark Stadion; Attendance: 5,864; Referee: Ivaylo Stoyanov (Bulgaria) |

| 6 October (Russia) 2018 W.C. Q | Spain | 3–0 | Albania | Alicante, Spain |
| 20:45 CEST (UTC+2) | Rodrigo 16'; Isco 24'; Thiago 27' | Report (FIFA); Report (UEFA) | | Stadium: Estadio José Rico Pérez; Attendance: 25,397; Referee: Aleksei Eskov (Russia) |

| 9 October (Russia) 2018 W.C. Q | Israel | 0–1 | Spain | Jerusalem, Israel |
| 20:45 CEST (UTC+3) | | Report (FIFA); Report (UEFA) | Illarramendi 76' | Stadium: Teddy Stadium; Attendance: 28,700; Referee: Craig Thomson (Scotland) |

| 11 November Friendly | Spain | 5–0 | Costa Rica | Málaga, Spain |
| 22:30 CET (UTC+1) | Alba 6'; Morata 23'; Silva 51', 55'; Iniesta 73' | Report | | Stadium: La Rosaleda Stadium; Attendance: 30,000; Referee: Anastasios Sidiropoulos (Greece) |

| 14 November Friendly | Russia | 3–3 | Spain | Saint Petersburg, Russia |
| 20:45 MSK (UTC+3); 18:45 CET (UTC+1) | Smolov 41', 70'; Miranchuk 51' | Report | Alba 9'; Ramos 35' (pen.), 54' (pen.) | Stadium: Krestovsky Stadium; Attendance: 45,480; Referee: Gianluca Rocchi (Italy) |

=== 2018 ===
14 matches played:

| 23 March Friendly | Germany | 1–1 | Spain | Düsseldorf, Germany |
| 20:45; 20:45 CET (UTC+1) | Müller 35' | Report | Rodrigo 6' | Stadium: Esprit Arena; Attendance: 50,653; Referee: Willie Collum (Scotland) |

| 27 March Friendly | Spain | 6–1 | Argentina | Madrid, Spain |
| 21:30; 21:30 CEST (UTC+2) | Costa 12'; Isco 27', 52', 74'; Thiago 55'; Aspas 73' | Report | Otamendi 39' | Stadium: Wanda Metropolitano; Attendance: 65,541; Referee: Anthony Taylor (England) |

| 3 June Friendly | Spain | 1–1 | Switzerland | Villarreal, Spain |
| 21:00; 21:00 CEST (UTC+2) | Odriozola 29' | Report | Rodríguez 62' | Stadium: Estadio de la Cerámica; Attendance: 18,350; Referee: István Kovács (Romania) |

| 9 June Friendly | Tunisia | 0–1 | Spain | Krasnodar, Russia |
| 21:45; 20:45 MSK (UTC+3) | | Report | Aspas 84' | Stadium: Krasnodar Stadium; Attendance: 33,116; Referee: Bas Nijhuis (Netherlands) |

| 15 June (Russia) 2018 W.C. GS | Portugal | 3–3 | Spain | Sochi, Russia |
| 20:00; 21:00 MSK (UTC+3) | Ronaldo 4' (pen.), 44', 88' | Report | Costa 24', 55'; Nacho 58' | Stadium: Fisht Olympic Stadium; Attendance: 43,866; Referee: Gianluca Rocchi (Italy) |

| 20 June (Russia) 2018 W.C. GS | Iran | 0–1 | Spain | Kazan, Russia |
| 20:00; 21:00 MSK (UTC+3) | | Report | Costa 54' | Stadium: Kazan Arena; Attendance: 42,718; Referee: Andrés Cunha (Uruguay) |

| 25 June (Russia) 2018 W.C. GS | Spain | 2–2 | Morocco | Kaliningrad, Russia |
| 20:00; 20:00 KALT (UTC+2) | Isco 19'; Aspas 90+1' | Report | Boutaïb 14'; En-Nesyri 81' | Stadium: Kaliningrad Stadium; Attendance: 33,973; Referee: Ravshan Irmatov (Uzbekistan) |

| 1 July (Russia) 2018 W.C. R16 | Spain | 1–1 (a.e.t.) (3–4 p) | Russia | Moscow, Russia |
| 17:00; 17:00 MSK (UTC+3) | Ignashevich 12' (o.g.) | Report | Dzyuba 41' (pen.) | Stadium: Luzhniki Stadium; Attendance: 78,011; Referee: Björn Kuipers (Netherlands) |
| | Penalties |
| | Iniesta (penalty scored); Piqué (penalty scored); Koke (penalty missed); Ramos (penalty scored); Aspas (penalty missed) | | (penalty scored) Smolov; (penalty scored) Ignashevich; (penalty scored) Golovin; (penalty scored) Cheryshev |

| 8 September (European Union) 2018–19 U.N.L. | England | 1–2 | Spain | London, England |
| 20:45; 19:45 BST (UTC+1) | Rashford 11' | Report | Saúl 13'; Rodrigo 32' | Stadium: Wembley Stadium; Attendance: 81,392; Referee: Danny Makkelie (Netherlands) |

| 11 September (European Union) 2018–19 U.N.L. | Spain | 6–0 | Croatia | Elche, Spain |
| 20:45; 20:45 CEST (UTC+2) | Saúl 24'; Asensio 33'; Kalinić 35' (o.g.); Rodrigo 49'; Ramos 57'; Isco 70' | Report | | Stadium: Estadio Martínez Valero; Attendance: 29,000; Referee: Benoît Bastien (France) |

| 11 October Friendly | Wales | 1–4 | Spain | Cardiff, Wales |
| 20:45; 19:45 BST (UTC+1) | Vokes 89' | Report | Alcácer 8', 29'; Ramos 19'; Bartra 74' | Stadium: Millennium Stadium; Attendance: 50,232; Referee: Anthony Taylor (England) |

| 15 October (European Union) 2018–19 U.N.L. | Spain | 2–3 | England | Seville, Spain |
| 20:45; 20:45 CEST (UTC+2) | Alcácer 58'; Ramos 90+8' | Report | Sterling 16', 38'; Rashford 30' | Stadium: Benito Villamarín; Attendance: 50,355; Referee: Szymon Marciniak (Poland) |

| 15 November (European Union) 2018–19 U.N.L. | Croatia | 3–2 | Spain | Zagreb, Croatia |
| 20:45; 20:45 CET (UTC+1) | Kramarić 54'; Jedvaj 69', 90+3' | Report | Ceballos 56'; Ramos 78' (pen.) | Stadium: Stadion Maksimir; Attendance: 35,000; Referee: Aleksei Kulbakov (Belarus) |

| 18 November Friendly | Spain | 1–0 | Bosnia and Herzegovina | Las Palmas, Spain |
| 20:45; 19:45 WET (UTC±0) | Méndez 78' | Report | | Stadium: Estadio Gran Canaria; Attendance: 15,000; Referee: Carlos Xistra (Portugal) |

=== 2019 ===
10 matches played:

| 23 March (European Union) 2020 Euro Q | Spain | 2–1 | Norway | Valencia, Spain |
| 20:45 (UTC+1) | Rodrigo 16'; Ramos 71' (pen.) | Report | King 65' (pen.) | Stadium: Mestalla; Attendance: 39,752; Referee: Andris Treimanis (Latvia) |

| 26 March (European Union) 2020 Euro Q | Malta | 0–2 | Spain | Ta' Qali, Malta |
| 20:45 (20:45 UTC+1) | | Report | Morata 31', 73' | Stadium: National Stadium; Attendance: 16,542; Referee: Andrew Dallas (Scotland) |

| 7 June (European Union) 2020 Euro Q | Faroe Islands | 1–4 | Spain | Tórshavn, Faroe Islands |
| 20:45 (19:45 UTC+1) | K. Olsen 30' | Report | Ramos 6'; Navas 19'; Gestsson 34' (o.g.); Gayà 71' | Stadium: Tórsvøllur; Attendance: 3,226; Referee: Enea Jorgji (Albania) |

| 10 June (European Union) 2020 Euro Q | Spain | 3–0 | Sweden | Madrid, Spain |
| 20:45 (UTC+2) | Ramos 64' (pen.); Morata 85' (pen.); Oyarzabal 87' | Report | | Stadium: Santiago Bernabéu; Attendance: 72,205; Referee: Willie Collum (Scotland) |

| 5 September (European Union) 2020 Euro Q | Romania | 1–2 | Spain | Bucharest, Romania |
| 20:45 (UTC+2) | Andone 59' | Report | Ramos 29' (pen.); Alcácer 47' | Stadium: Arena Națională; Attendance: 50,024; Referee: Deniz Aytekin (Germany) |

| 8 September (European Union) 2020 Euro Q | Spain | 4–0 | Faroe Islands | Gijón, Spain |
| 20:45 (UTC+2) | Rodrigo 13', 50'; Alcácer 90', 90+3' | Report | | Stadium: El Molinón; Attendance: 23,644; Referee: Krzysztof Jakubik (Poland) |

| 12 October (European Union) 2020 Euro Q | Norway | 1–1 | Spain | Oslo, Norway |
| 20:45 (UTC+2) | King 90+4' (pen.) | Report | Saúl 47' | Stadium: Ullevaal Stadion; Attendance: 25,200; Referee: Michael Oliver (England) |

| 15 October (European Union) 2020 Euro Q | Sweden | 1–1 | Spain | Solna, Sweden |
| 20:45 (UTC+2) | Berg 50' | Report | Rodrigo 90+2' | Stadium: Friends Arena; Attendance: 49,712; Referee: Clément Turpin (France) |

| 15 November (European Union) 2020 Euro Q | Spain | 7–0 | Malta | Cádiz, Spain |
| 20:45 (UTC+1) | Morata 23'; Cazorla 41'; Torres 62'; Sarabia 63'; Olmo 69'; Moreno 71'; Navas 85' | Report | | Stadium: Ramón de Carranza; Attendance: 19,773; Referee: Viktor Kassai (Hungary) |

| 18 November (European Union) 2020 Euro Q | Spain | 5–0 | Romania | Madrid, Spain |
| 20:45 (UTC+1) | Fabián 8'; Gerard 33', 43'; Rus 45+1' (o.g.); Oyarzabal 90+2' | Report | | Stadium: Wanda Metropolitano; Attendance: 36,198; Referee: Aleksei Kulbakov (Belarus) |
