= Agüero =

Agüero may refer to:

== People ==
- Agüero (surname), a Spanish-language surname

== Places ==
- Agüero, Huesca, a town in the province of Huesca, Spain
- Calle Agüero, a street in Buenos Aires, Argentina
- Agüero (Buenos Aires Underground), a metro station in Buenos Aires, Argentina

== See also ==
- Agüera (disambiguation)
