= Sebastián Valenzuela Agüero =

Chilean politician (born 1977)

Sebastián Valenzuela
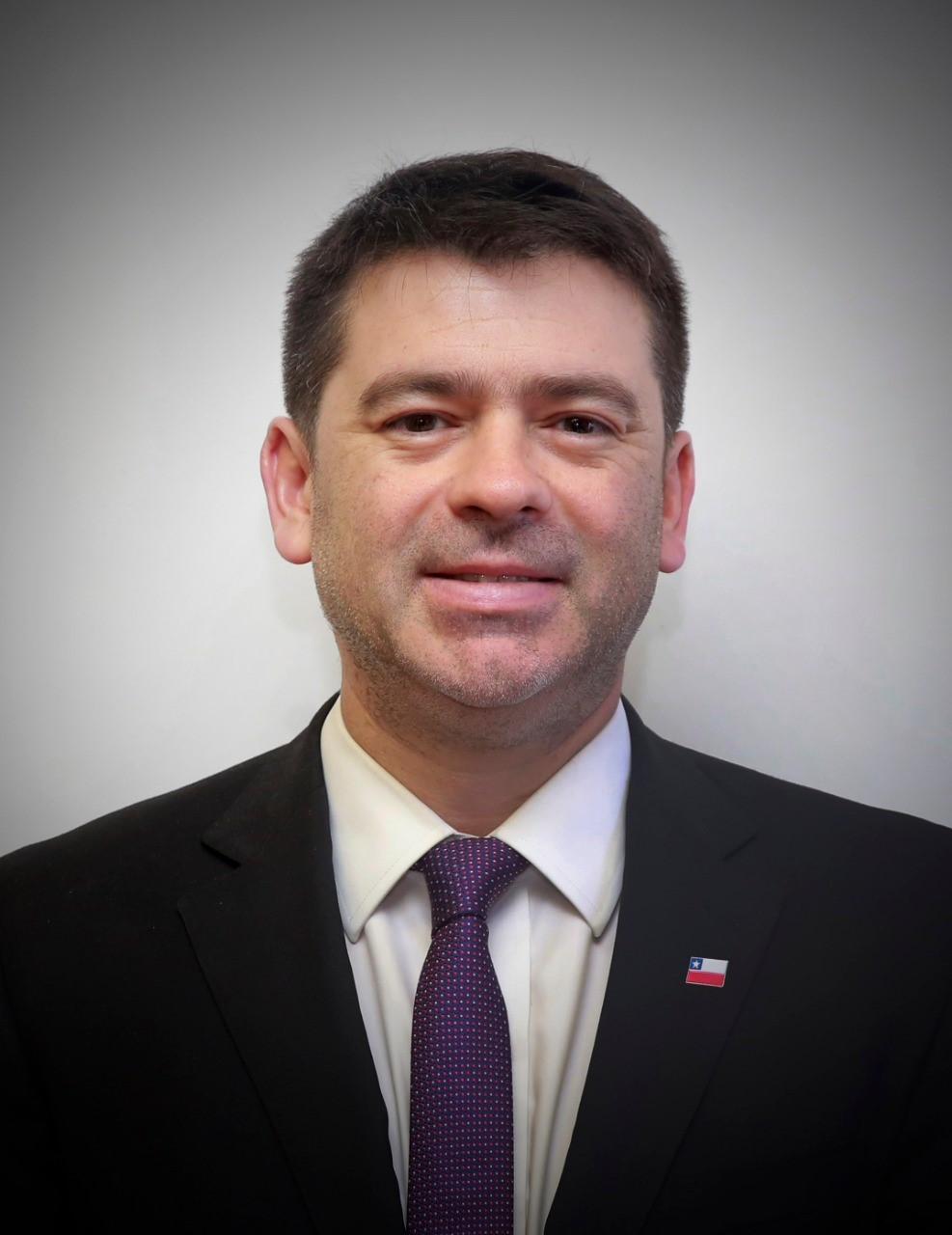

Undersecretary of Justice
- In office 1 January 2020 – 11 March 2022
- President: Sebastián Pinera
- Preceded by: Juan José Ossa
- Succeeded by: Jaime Gajardo Falcón

Personal details
- Born: 14 September 1977 (age 49) Valparaíso, Chile
- Education: Pontifical Catholic University of Valparaíso (LL.B) (Master's Degree)
- Profession: Lawyer

Sebastián Andrés Valenzuela Agüero (born 14 September 1977) is a Chilean lawyer who served as Undersecretary of Justice during Sebastián Pinera's second government.

He has taught at the Central University of Chile and the Pontifical Catholic University of Chile.

== Biography ==
Valenzuela was born in Valparaíso to the couple of Juan Renato Valenzuela and Carmen Agüero Piwonka. Later, he attended the Pontifical Catholic University of Valparaíso (PUCV) where he did his bachelor of arts in laws. Similarly, Valenzuela completed a Master of Arts in the same career.

During Sebastián Pinera's first government (2010−2014), he worked as Chief of Social Reintegration, department linked to the Ministry of Justice.

From March 2018 to June 2019, once Pinera was elected again, Valenzuela worked as Chief of the Legal Division of the then new Ministry of Justice and Human Rights. Then, on December 19, 2019, Valenzuela was appointed as Undersecretary of Justice, a position he officially assumed on January 1, 2020.
