= Susana Agüero =

Argentine ballet dancer (1944–2012)

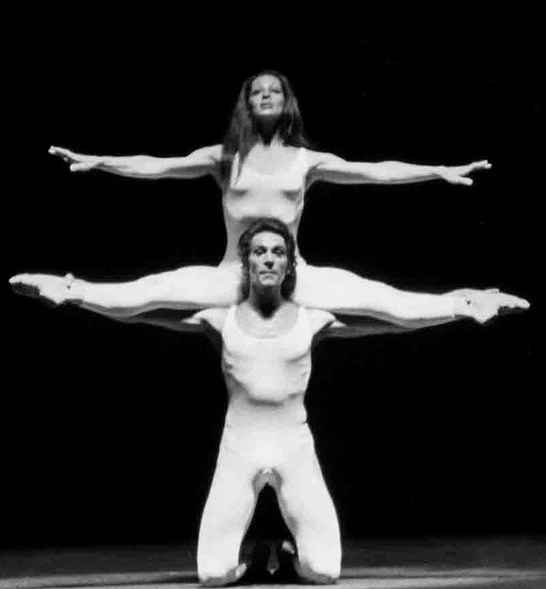
- Susana Agüero with her brother Luis in 1976
- Born: 1944; Buenos Aires
- Died: March 26, 2012 (aged 67–68); Buenos Aires
- Occupation: Argentine ballet dancer
- Career
- Dances: Odette in Swan Lake; the Lilac Fairy in The Sleeping Beauty; Wolfgang Fortner's Movements; Serge Lifar's Suite en blanc

Susana Agüero (1944– March 26, 2012) was an Argentine ballet dancer who also danced in musicals and shows. She took a number of leading roles and worked for six years in France.

== Biography ==
Agüero was born in Buenos Aires. She trained at the Instituto Superior de Arte at the Teatro Colón (Columbus Theatre) which is the capital's main opera house. Her teachers included Gema Castillo, Michel Borowsky, María Ruanova, Adolfo Andrade and Serge Golovine. She soon became a soloist. Among her most important roles were Odette in Swan Lake and the Lilac Fairy in The Sleeping Beauty. She also danced in Wolfgang Fortner's Movements and Serge Lifar's Suite en blanc. She performed as étoile for the Chilean National Ballet. In the 1970s, she became first soloist with the Lyon Opera Ballet. She spent six years in France before she returned to Argentina, suffering from poor eyesight — but the problem was soon rectified. She also played in the musical A Chorus Line and in the Argentine show La Botica del Ángel, demonstrating her ability to extend her talents beyond classical ballet.

In Argentina she worked again at the Teatro Colón in Buenos Aires. She worked under Oscar Araiz who led their choreography. The theatre particularly remember that in 1978 she successfully stepped into the role of Swan Lake at the last minute after lead Maya Plisetskaya did not appear.

== Assessment ==
Susana Agüero died in Buenos Aires on 26 March 2012. "She was the first Odette I ever experienced," commented choreographer Alejandro Cervera. "I remember her as a very beautiful and tremendously charming and entertaining ballerina." She defined herself as a lifelong dancer. At the time of her death, Teatro Colón's Clarín mentioned her fine, personalized dancing, her flexibility and her willingness to breach the bounds of academic ballet.
