= Mario Aguero (basketball) =

Cuban basketball player (1924–2001)

Personal information
- Born: 1 May 1924 Camagüey, Cuba
- Died: 22 June 2001 (aged 77) Winchester, Virginia, United States

Sport
- Sport: Basketball

Mario Aguero (1 May 1924 – 22 June 2001) was a Cuban basketball player. He competed in the men's tournament at the 1948 Summer Olympics.
