= Agüera =

Agüera may refer to:

== People with the surname ==
- Cristina Agüera Gago (born 1990), Spanish politician
- José Gutiérrez de Agüera, Spanish politician and Minister of State in 1898
- Ander Herrera Agüera (born 1989), Spanish footballer
- Salvador Gómez Agüera (born 1968), Spanish water polo player and Olympic gold medalist

== Places ==
- Agüera (Belmonte), a civil parish in Belmonte de Miranda, Asturias, Spain
- Agüera del Coto, a civil parish in Cangas del Narcea, Asturias, Spain
- Asón-Agüera, comarca of Cantabria, Spain
- Lagouira or La Agüera, a town in Western Sahara
- Río Agüera, a river in northern Spain

== See also ==
- Agüero (disambiguation)
