= Iván Darío Agudelo =

Colombian politician

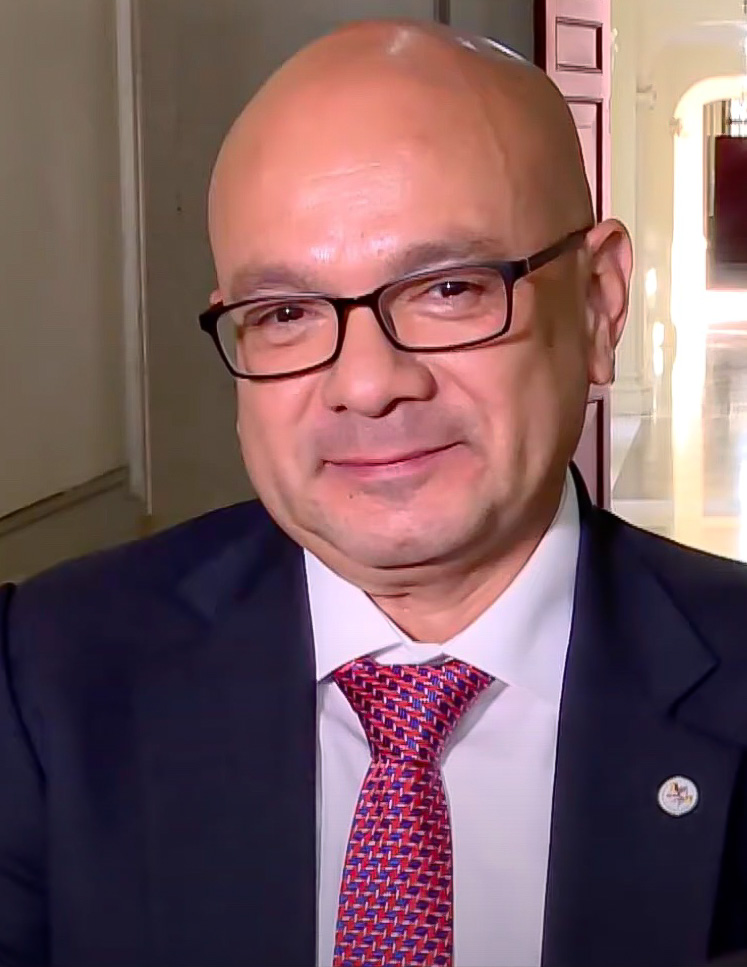

Senator of the Republic of Colombia
- Incumbent
- Assumed office From July 20, 2018

Member of the House of Representatives of Colombia for Antioquia
- In office July 20, 2010 – July 20, 2018

Deputy of the Assembly of Antioquia
- In office January 1, 2008 – July 30, 2009

Personal details
- Born: August 15, 1967 (age 58) Medellín, Colombia
- Party: Colombian Liberal Party
- Education: Universidad de Medellín
- Occupation: Lawyer

Iván Darío Agudelo Zapata (born August 15, 1967) is a Colombian lawyer and politician. He was a Member of the Colombian House of Representatives representing Antioquia. He is currently a senator in the Senate of Colombia. In the 2010 legislative elections, he was elected Representative to the House for Antioquia with the endorsement of the Colombian Liberal Party with 22,022 votes. In the 2014 legislative elections he was reelected with 40,356 votes into the House of Representatives. During the 2018 legislative elections, he was elected Senator of the Republic with 68,034 votes.

== Biography ==
Agudelo Zapata is a lawyer from the Universidad de Medellín with a specialization in business law from the Autonomous University of Bucaramanga. He was a professor at the Universidad de Medellín between 1998 and 2006. He was an advisor to the Antioquia government between 1998 and 2003. Between 2003 and 2006, he was a representative of the Guardian and Protection of Human Rights, before the Medellín Prosecutor's Office. In 2007 he was elected deputy of Antioquia for the period 2008–2012 with 16,266 votes. In July 2009 he resigned his seat to run for the House of Representatives.

In the 2010 legislative elections, he was elected Representative to the House for Antioquia with the endorsement of the Colombian Liberal Party with 22,022 votes. In the 2014 legislative elections he was reelected with 41,327 votes.

== Congress of Colombia ==
After being elected as a congressman in the 2018 legislative elections, being the speaker of the creation of the new Ministry of Science, Technology and Innovation, which was successfully created by the Colombian Senate on 16 December 2018.
