= Nando Gómez =

Spanish footballer

Nando
Personal information
- Full name: Fernando Gómez Herrera
- Date of birth: 26 February 1984 (age 42)
- Place of birth: Mancha Real, Spain
- Height: 1.85 m (6 ft 1 in)
- Position: Left back

Youth career
- Mancha Real

Senior career*
Years	Team	Apps	(Gls)
2003–2005	Mancha Real		
2005–2006	Torredonjimeno	32	(2)
2006–2007	Alcalá	33	(2)
2007–2008	Marbella	31	(0)
2008–2012	Mancha Real	116	(5)
2012–2017	Jaén	156	(0)
2017–2022	Mancha Real	76	(2)
2022–2024	Ciudad de Torredonjimeno	34	(2)
- * Club domestic league appearances and goals as of 12 May 2024

Fernando Gómez Herrera (born 26 February 1984), commonly known as Nando, is a Spanish footballer who plays as a left back.

== Club career ==
Born in Mancha Real, Province of Jaén, Nando made his senior debuts with local Atlético Mancha Real in the 2003–04 season. In 2006, he first arrived in the Segunda División B, signing for CD Alcalá.

Nando alternated between the third level and the Tercera División in the following years, with UD Marbella, Atlético Mancha Real (playing one season in the fifth level) and Real Jaén. He achieved promotion at the end of the 2012–13 campaign with the latter, appearing in 28 matches.

On 25 August 2013 Nando made his debut as a professional, being sent off in a 2–4 away defeat against CD Numancia in the Segunda División.
