= Joaquín Vázquez =

Spanish footballer

Medal record

Men's football

Representing Spain

Olympic Games
Silver medal – second place	1920 Antwerp	Team competition

Joaquín Vázquez Fernández (26 August 1897 – 21 October 1965) was a Spanish footballer. He competed in the 1920 Summer Olympics. Fernández was born in Badajoz. He was a member of the Spanish team, which won the silver medal in the football tournament.
