= Fernando Gómez-Reino =

Spanish swimmer

Personal information
- Born: December 21, 1955 (age 70)

Sport
- Sport: Swimming

Fernando Gómez-Reino (born 21 December 1955) is a Spanish former freestyle swimmer who competed in the 1976 Summer Olympics.
