= Herme Medina Agüero =

Paraguayan activist, poet, and musician (1944–2016)

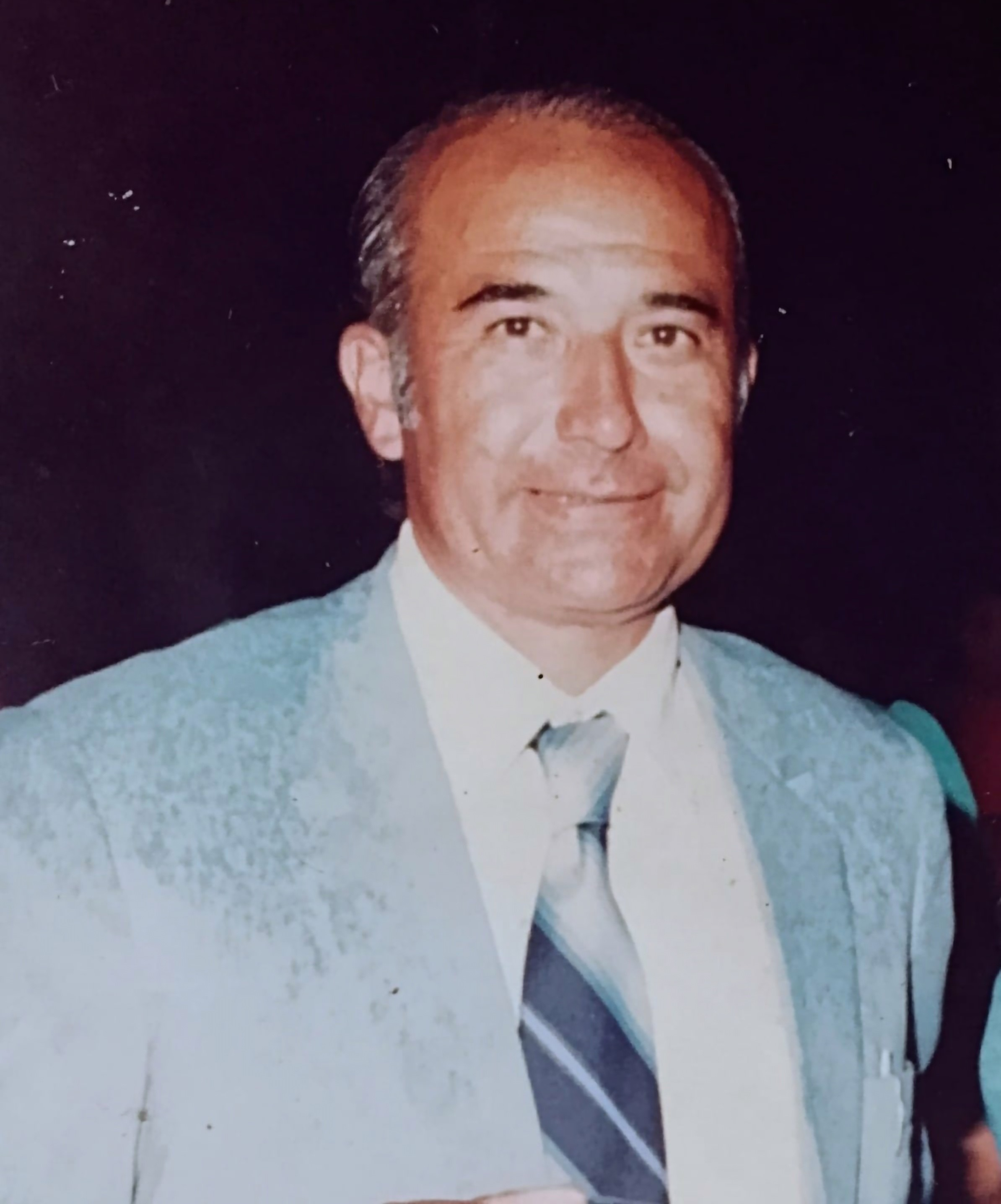
- Born: Hermenegildo Medina Agüero; April 13, 1944; Pilar, Ñeembucú Department, Paraguay
- Died: June 11, 2016 (aged 72)
- Occupations: Poet; musician; factory worker; political activist
- Political party: Authentic Radical Liberal Party

Hermenegildo Medina Agüero (Pilar, April 13, 1944 – id. June 11, 2016), better known by his pseudonym Herme Medina Agüero; was a Paraguayan poet, singer, harpist, orator and music performer. Opposer to Alfredo Stroessner's regime and author of more than 120 poetic works, he is one of the representatives of the folklore of the Ñeembucú Department, receiving in 2006 a recognition as an outstanding writer by Mercosur authorities.

== Biography ==
=== Children and youth ===
Born in the 6th Medina Company, district of Pilar, on April 13, 1944; he is the third son of Feliciano Medina Álvarez and Atanacia de Jesús Agüero Falcón. When he was 7 years old, he entered High School No. 190, today Educational Center No. 5 of the Medina Company, until he finished elementary school. His last teacher was Prof. Tito Arsacio Benítez. He occupied the first place in educational application, obtaining a total of 107 points and an average of 8.

At the age of 17, he voluntarily presented himself three months before conscription for compulsory military service in the barracks of Battalion 40, today Border Battalion No. 1. During his stay in the unit, he showed very good behavior, for which he was promoted to 2nd Corporal by order of the day No. 87 on April 10, 1963, and to 1st Corporal by order of the day No. 239 on October 11, 1963, "for merit for his discipline, dedication to work and love of responsibility", as stated in his compulsory military service record.

He started working at Manufactura de Pilar S.A. on June 4, 1964. After living in his own home, he married Gregoria Mancuello Ozuna on Saturday, December 28, 1968. They had five children, three girls and two boys. During his tenure at Manufactura Pilar S.A. he held the position of Section Delegate on several occasions. He received scrolls and silver medals in appreciation for his 30 years of service. He made his voluntary retirement from the company on December 8, 1995, completing his working time of 31 years, 6 months and 5 days within the company.

=== Political and artistic life ===
Opposer to the military dictatorship of Alfredo Stroessner, he joined the Authentic Radical Liberal Party; his first political activity was as secretary of the Sub-Committee of Barrio Obrero, then president of the same neighborhood and later member of the Committee of Pilar, occupying the position of treasurer. He was one of the founders of the Ko'eju Hovy movement, founded in 1987. He directed a radio program called Poteĩ Ára Hovy together with comrades Jorge Sánchez Villa, Alba Valenzuela, Hugo Villalba, Ludmina Riveros de Sánchez, Juana Delgado, and Víctor Ríos Ojeda. Later, the program was called Ko'eju Hovy, continuing with the participation of Herme Medina Agüero until December 1995. Since that date he has been away from political activities due to a cardiovascular disorder.

As a player of the Paraguayan harp and guitar, poet, singer and orator. Since 1964 he began to write poetry in Guarani and Spanish, totaling more than 120 poetic works, some of which were recorded: Llorando sin consuelo, Aju romomaiteívo, Rubita de ojos azules, etc. She also directed the radio program Maitei Okaraguápe for 4 years on Zp 12 Radio Carlos Antonio López of Pilar, Paraguay. He participated in the First International Congress of Guarani Language, in Pilar, and on December 6, 2014, under the auspices of the Athenaeum of Guarani Language and Culture and with the presence of the Municipality of Humaitá, he participated in the Second International Congress of Guarani Language, in Humaitá.

=== Death ===
Herme Medina Agüero died on Saturday, June 11, 2016; due to complications with prostate cancer, a disease he had been suffering from for years. After his death, the website of the Association of Musicians of Pilar held a commemoration for him. His works continue to be transmitted through national radio stations and broadcast on the Internet.
