= Fernando Gómez Agudelo =

Colombian lawyer

Fernando Gómez Agudelo (Bogota, April 22, 1931 – November 16, 1993) was a Colombian lawyer who was involved in the development of the television industry in Colombia.
