= 1925 Workers' Summer Olympiad =

- Host city: Frankfurt am Main, Germany
- Nations: 11
- Athletes: 3,000
- Events: 44
- Dates: July 24, 1925– July 28, 1925

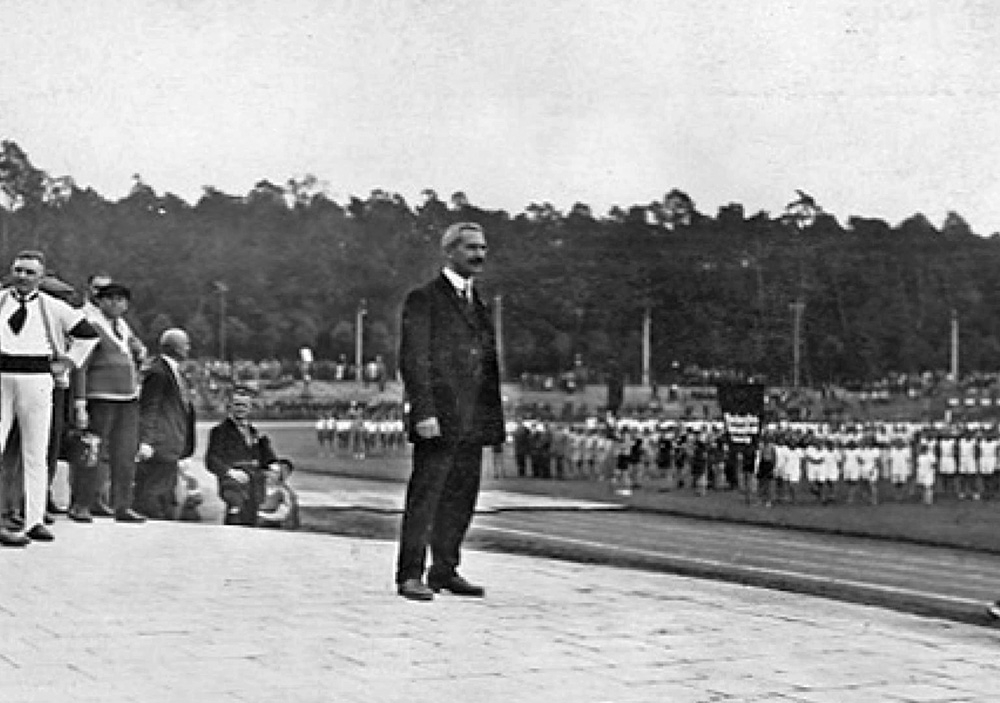
Organiser Georg Benedix at the opening ceremony of 1925 Workers' Summer Olympiad.

The 1925 Workers' Summer Olympiad was the second edition of International Workers' Olympiads. The games were held from July 24 to July 28 at Frankfurt am Main in Germany.

Total number of participants was more than 100,000 of which 3,000 were actual athletes from 12 countries. The rest were spectators who were invited to take part on mass gymnastics that underlined the ideas of worker sports. Motto of the 1925 Olympiad was "Nie wieder Krieg!" – No More War!

The events mostly took place at the newly opened Waldstadion that is today known as Commerzbank-Arena. An outdoor swimming pool, Stadionbad, was built for the swimming competitions. The opening ceremony had a choir of 1,200 people singing and later 60,000 actors took part in the drama presentation "Worker Struggle for the Earth" marching through the streets of Frankfurt. All events attracted a total of 450,000 spectators.

The most notable result was a new world record of 51.3 in women's 4×100 metres relay set by the German team of Arbeiter-Turn- und Sportbund (ATSB), although it was never ratified by IAAF. Football tournament was also won by the German team of ATSB. The most successful athletes came from Finnish Workers' Sports Federation, winning 31 events out of 44.

== Sports ==
- Athletics
- Boxing
- Cycling
- Football (details)
- Handball (details)
- Gymnastics
- Swimming
- Water polo
- Wrestling

== Participating countries ==
- Austria
- Belgium
- Czechoslovakia
- Free City of Danzig
- Finland
- France
- Germany
- Great Britain
- Latvia
- Poland
- Switzerland

== Men's results ==
=== Athletics ===
Event	Gold		Silver		Bronze	
100 metres	(Finland) Jalmari Etholén	11.3	(Finland) Väinö Mattila	11.4	(Finland) Vilho Mankki	11.4
200 metres	(Finland) Jalmari Etholén	23.2	(Finland) Karl-Emil Virta	23.3	(Finland) Niilo Mattila	23.7
400 metres	(Finland) Karl-Emil Virta	51.6	(Finland) Emil Elo	52.2	(Finland) Vilho Mankki	52.8
800 metres	(Finland) Eino Borg	1:59.0	(Finland) Yrjö Järvinen	2:03.5	(Finland) Yrjö Halén	2:04.1
1500 metres	(Finland) Eino Borg	4:07.0	(Finland) Mauno Rutanen	4:11.5	(Germany) Wagner	
3000 metres	(Finland) Eino Borg	8:47.2	(Finland) Yrjö Jokela	8:47.6	(Finland) A. Vuorinen	9:03.2
5000 metres	(Finland) Yrjö Jokela	15:31.0	(Finland) Toivo Salmi	15:43.5	(Finland) A. Vuorinen	16:06.7
10,000 metres	(Finland) Yrjö Jokela	32:21.6	(Finland) Jalmari Kaila	33:02.0	(Finland) Toivo Salmi	33:34.2
25,000 metres	(Finland) Iivari Rötkö	1:24:37.0	(Finland) Väinö Laaksonen	1:24:51.5	(Finland) Yrjö Vänttinen	1:25:10.0
110 metres hurdles	(Finland) Niilo Mattila	16.4	(Finland) Väinö Kääriäinen	16.6	(Germany) Wells	16.6
400 metres hurdles	(Finland) Niilo Mattila	58.2	(Finland) Väinö Kääriäinen	59.5	(Germany) Wells	1:00.8
4×100 metres relay	Finland	44.0	Latvia	45.8	Germany	45.8
10×100 metres relay	Finland	1:51.8	Germany	1:54.1	Germany II	1:55.1
4×400 metres relay	Finland	3:34.0	Germany	3:37.5	France	
3×1000 metres relay	Finland	8:04.4	Germany	8:20.0	France	8:54.8
Sprint medley relay	Finland	3:43.2	Germany	3:49.7	Austria	3:55.5
Swedish relay	Finland	2:07.8	Germany	2:08.1	Switzerland	2:08.8
3000 metres team race	Finland	9:31.7	Germany	10:03.1	France	10:33.9
10 kilometres walk	(Germany) Burghardt	48:38.0	(Germany) Wolff	48:52.4	(Germany) Bohner	49:16.1
High jump	(Finland) Kalle Korpi	1.79	(Finland) Artturi Niemi	1.79	(Finland) Onni Heinänen	1.73
Pole vault	(Finland) Nestor Kristoffersson (Latvia) Robert Vitthoff	343	–	–	(Finland) Rudolf Muukkonen	330
Long jump	(Finland) Onni Heinänen	6.88	(Finland) Paavo Virtanen	6.80	(Latvia) Rodzit	6.60
Triple jump	(Finland) Paavo Virtanen	14.28	(Finland) Vilho Takkinen	14.04	(Germany) Hauerstein	13.65
Shot put	(Finland) Oskar Lindborg	12.98	(Finland) Jussi Laiho	12.72	(Finland) Oskar Lindborg	12.57
Shot put (light)	(Finland) Kalervo Kotivalo	19.96	(Finland) Jussi Laiho	17.75	(Germany) Barthel	17.39
Discus throw	(Finland) Oskar Lindborg	41.55	(Finland) Jussi Laiho	40.57	(Latvia) T. Subatnik	38.82
Hammer throw	(Finland) Jussi Laiho	43.29	(Finland) Vilhelm Silius	38.85	(Germany) Hefele	32.62
Javelin throw	(Finland) Kalle Korpi	54.71	(Finland) H. Ilmonen	54.64	(Finland) U. Virtanen	53.50
Stone throw	(Finland) Kalervo Kotivalo	8.83	(Finland) Oskar Lindborg	8.31	(Germany) E. Hummel	7.75
Weight throw	(Finland) Jussi Laiho	15.59	(Finland) Vilhelm Silius	15.11	–	–
Slingshot throw	(Germany) Barthel	55.95	(Germany) Hensge		(Germany) Weber	
Pentathlon	(Finland) Kalervo Kotivalo	578	(Finland) U. Virtanen	557	(Finland) Nestor Kristoffersson	545
Decathlon	(Finland) Rudolf Muukkonen	1119.0	(Finland) Vilho Takkinen	1029.5	(Latvia) Robeschnich	983.5
Tug of war	Germany		Belgium		–	–

=== Boxing ===
Event	Gold	Silver	Bronze
Flyweight	(Finland) Veikko Mutikainen	(Germany) Gutte	(Switzerland) Müller
Bantamweight	(Finland) Onni Rautiainen	(Finland) Oiva Johtonen	(Germany) Klippel
Featherweight	(Germany) Berger	(Germany) Reppin	(Germany) Möveberg
Lightweight	(Germany) Scherm	(Finland) Eino Kalervo	–
Welterweight	(Finland) Soini Andersin	(Germany) Völkel	(Finland) Sven Vilenius
Middleweight	(Germany) Bauer	(Finland) Gösta Brännäs	(Finland) Veikko Paananen
Light heavyweight	(Latvia) Janis Vigriezis	(Germany) Braun	–
Heavyweight	(Latvia) Vilis Klesbergs	(Germany) Schädler	–

=== Cycling ===
Event	Gold		Silver		Bronze	
1,000 m	(France) Durand	1:33.7	(United Kingdom) Inman		(Finland) Ilmari Mäkelä	
2,000 m	(France) Durand	3:14.7	(United Kingdom) Dewener		(United Kingdom) Inman	
10 km	(France) Frot	16:22.5	(Austria) Stoll		(United Kingdom) Dewener	
50 km	(Belgium) Pirson	1:23.1	(United Kingdom) May		(France) Frot	
10 km road race	(Austria) Stoll	15:12.5	(Finland) Ilmari Mäkelä		(United Kingdom) Bemforth	
20 km road race	(Belgium) Seguet	32:01.4	(Germany) Fisch	32:01.6	(Austria) Hanakam	32:05.2
50 km road race	(Germany) W. Rau	1:30.1	(Germany) F. Appel		(Germany) Josef Rotz	
6×1,000 m	Austria		(United Kingdom) Great Britain		–	–
50 km, team	Austria	1:27.07	France		Germany	

=== Football ===
see Football at the International Workers' Olympiads#Frankfurt am Main 1925

=== Gymnastics ===
Event	Gold		Silver		Bronze	
Octathlon	(Germany) Kurt Rödel	149.5	(Germany) Albert Rahnfeldt	149.5	(Germany) Wilhelm Buri	139.5
Dodecathlon	(Finland) Toivo Salonen	208.5	(Finland) Onni Mäki	194.0	(Finland) Kalle Lehtinen	188.8
Dodecathlon, team	Finland					

=== Handball ===
see Handball at the 1925 Workers' Summer Olympiad

=== Swimming ===
Event	Gold		Silver		Bronze	
100 m freestyle	(Germany) Werner	1:09.6	(Germany) Koluza	1:10.0	(Germany) Urhalt	1:12.0
400 m freestyle	(Germany) Gödke	5:59.2	(Germany) Koluza	6:10.4	(Germany) Hope	6:21.0
1500 m freestyle	(Germany) Krause	25:28.4	(Germany) Dahle	26:15.0	(Austria) Gold	27:48.6
100 m backstroke	(Germany) Schultz	1:21.4	(Germany) Lohrer	1:24.4	(Germany) Stechert	1:25.0
100 m breaststroke	(Germany) Jaskulsky	1:28.2	(Germany) Schultz	1:29.6	(Finland) Pentti Vihervaara	1:32.4
200 m breaststroke	(Germany) Lehmann	3:11.6	(Germany) Schultz	3:19.2	(Germany) Kannenberg	3:19.6
400 m breaststroke	(Germany) Lehmann	6:48.2	(Germany) Kannenberg	6:52.0	(Germany) Küster	7:02.4
100 m sidestroke	(Germany) Faulde	1:17.6	(Germany) Schultz	1:19.2	(Germany) Hampe	1:20.6
4×100 m freestyle relay	Germany	4:48.4	Finland	5:32.8	–	–
4×100 m breaststroke relay	Germany	6:16.4	Finland	6:45.0	Belgium	7:20.8
4×100 m medley relay	Germany	5:25.4	Austria		Belgium	
Springboard	(Germany) Fritsche	56.3	(Germany) Papke	49.9	(Germany) Nachtigall	48.9
Plain high diving	(Germany) Lehmann	42.3	(Finland) Toivo Paavilainen	38.0	(Finland) Eino Währn	34.1

=== Water polo ===
Semi-finals
Germany	11
France	1
Austria	5
Belgium	1

Final
Germany (a.e.t.)	6
Austria	5
Third place
France	5
Belgium	2

=== Wrestling (Greco-Roman) ===
Event	Gold	Silver	Bronze
Bantamweight	(Germany) Justin Gehring	(Finland) Albert Siponen (Germany) W. Joneleit	(Germany) P. Sachse
Featherweight	(Finland) Arvo Salin	(Finland) Paavo Suomi	(Germany) H. Wittwer
Lightweight	(Finland) Matti Saarikoski	(Latvia) A. Sipol	(Finland) Jukka Ikonen
Middleweight	(Finland) Väinö Kokkinen	(Finland) Kaarlo Tammi	(Germany) H. Schädler
Light Heavyweight	(Finland) Verner Salonen	(Germany) P. Merkel	(Finland) Edwin Järnmark
Heavyweight	(Finland) Aleksi Kuusisto	(Germany) H. Kämpfer	(Germany) H. Sattel

== Women's results ==
=== Athletics ===
Event	Gold		Silver		Bronze	
100 metres	(Germany) Dittmar	12.9	(Germany) Hochholzer	13.0	(Germany) Hippler	13.3
4×100 metres	Germany	51.3	Finland	56.6	France	57.2
10×100 metres ^{[a]}	Czechoslovakia	2:29.2	–	–	–	–
Sprint medley relay	Germany	53.5	Finland	55.5	Germany II	57.4
Triathlon	(Finland) Elina Jääskeläinen	284	(Germany) Hochholzer	268	(Latvia) Eugenie Indersson	261
High jump	(Germany) Haase (Germany) Bleul	1.39	(Germany) Kauschke (Germany) Sarnes (Germany) Koch	1.29	(Switzerland) Vonier	1.26
Long jump	(Germany) Rauh	4.96	(Finland) Sally Virtanen	4.93	(Latvia) Eugenie Indersson	4.66
Shot put	(Latvia) Olga Drivin	8.07	(Finland) Elli Mattila	7.79	(Finland) Sally Virtanen	7.78
Discus throw	(Czechoslovakia) Fransiska Vodickova	20.39	(Latvia) Olga Drivin	20.17	(Germany) Kehrt	20.16
Javelin throw	(Latvia) Olga Drivin	33.28	(Finland) Elina Jääskeläinen	32.91	(Latvia) Eugenie Indersson	29.64
Slingshot throw	(Germany) Lang	24.80	(Czechoslovakia) Sulova	33.91	(Czechoslovakia) Mauleova	33.54

- ^{[a]} Germany (2:14.6) disqualified

=== Gymnastics ===
Event	Gold		Silver		Bronze	
Octathlon	(Austria) Hilda Neubaner	145.5	(Germany) Lisbeth Benedix	144.5	(Germany) Frida Gierke	144.0
Dodecathlon	(Germany) Helene Dick	177.7	(Czechoslovakia) Hela Pestowa	160.7	(Germany) Dora Rechbach	155.7

=== Swimming ===
Event	Gold		Silver		Bronze	
100 m freestyle ^{[a]}	(Germany) Mentrup	1:36.0	(Germany) Weller	1:45.0	(Finland) Vieno Kari	1:54.2
100 m breaststroke	(Germany) Scholle	1:37.0	(Germany) Boer	1:38.4	(Germany) Mentrup	1:41.0
200 m breaststroke	(Germany) Boer	3:42.2	(Finland) Irja Henriksson	3:45.4	(Austria) Buchbinder	3:56.6
100 m backstroke	(Germany) Guitscholle	1:37.2	(Germany) Klein	1:40.0	(Austria) Buchbinder	1:40.4
3×100 m medley relay ^{[b]}	Austria	4:56.4	Finland	5:28.2	–	–
4×100 m freestyle relay	Germany	6:52.0	Finland	7:07.4	–	–
Artistic swimming	(Germany) Meier		(Germany) Kender		(Germany) Trommel	
Springboard	(Germany) Boer	56.1	(Germany) Ende	47.0	(Germany) Trommar	44.4

- ^{[a]} Irma Lumivuokko, FIN (1:35.4) disqualified
- ^{[b]} Germany (4:51.4) disqualified
