= Waldstadion (Frankfurt) =

Stadium in Frankfurt am Main, Germany

Deutsche Bank Park
- Waldstadion

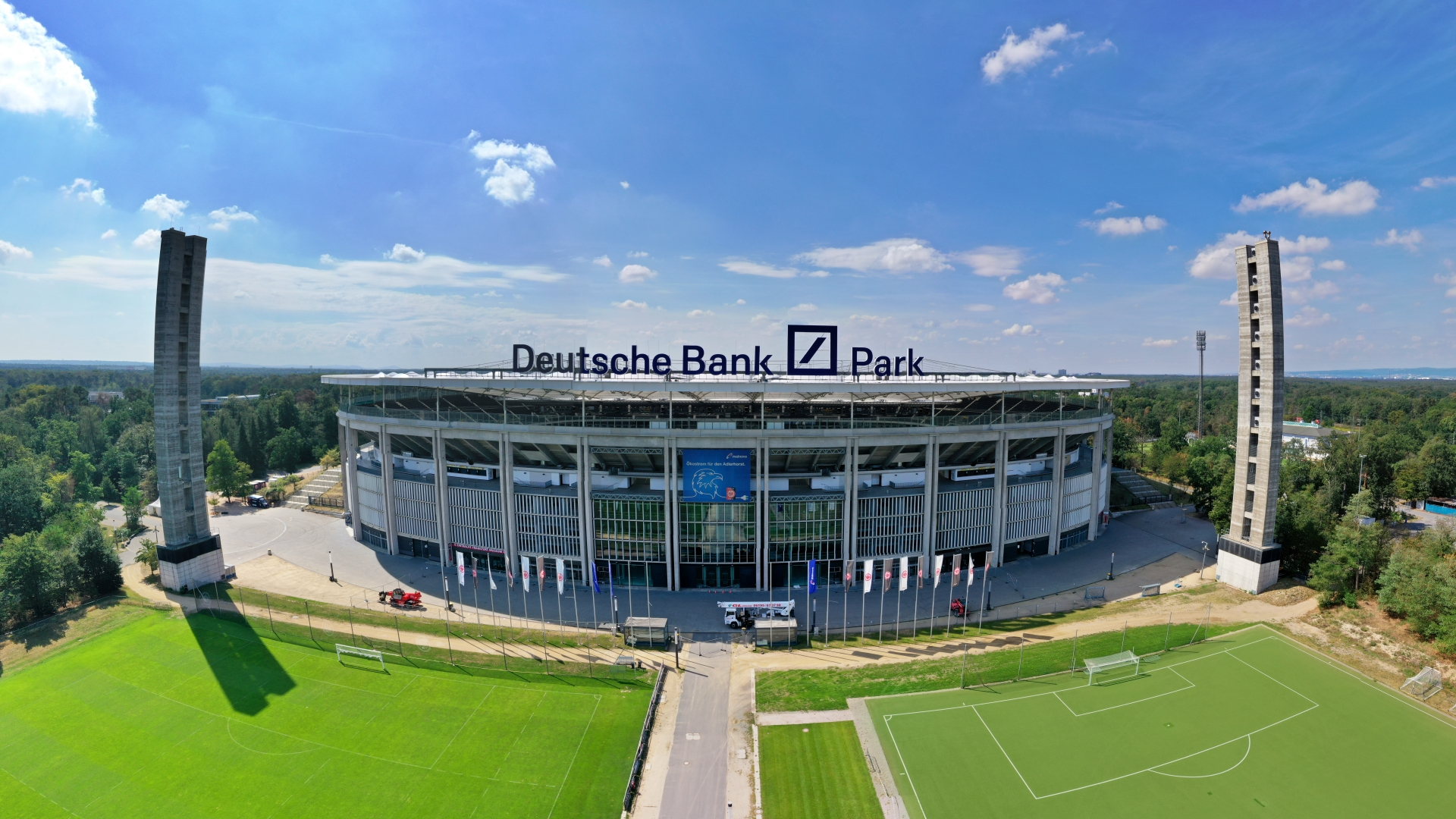
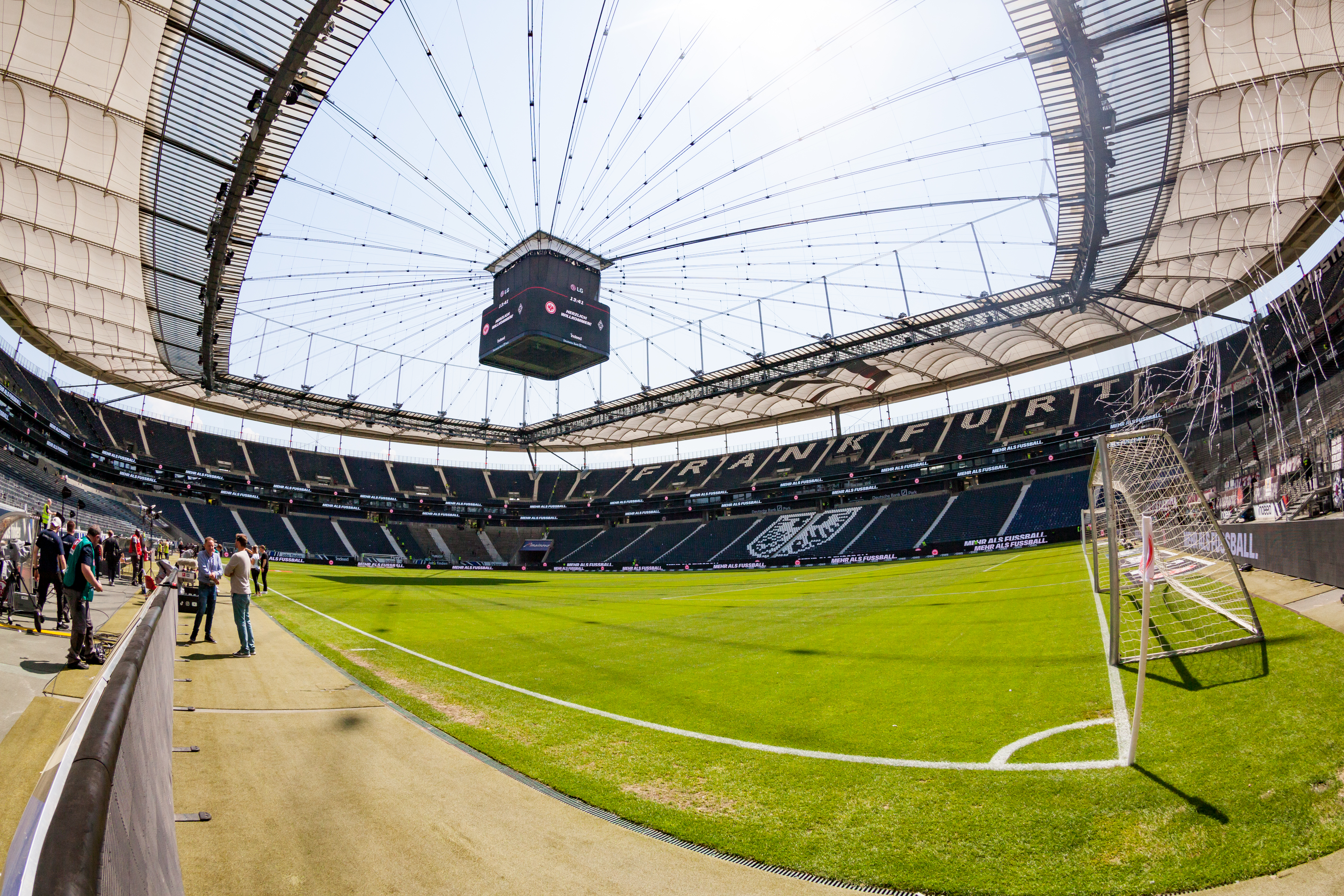
- UEFA
- Interactive map of Deutsche Bank Park
- Former names: Waldstadion (1925–2005); Neues Waldstadion (2005–2006); FIFA World Cup Stadium Frankfurt (2006); FIFA Women's World Cup Stadium Frankfurt (2011); Commerzbank-Arena (2005–2020)
- Address: Mörfelder Landstraße 362
- Location: Frankfurt, Germany
- Coordinates: 50°04′05″N 8°38′45″E
- Owner: Waldstadion Frankfurt Gesellschaft für Projektentwicklung
- Operator: Eintracht Frankfurt Stadion GmbH
- Capacity: Association football: 60,100 (20,000 standing for league matches); 53,800 (International matches); American football: 48,000; Concerts: 44,000–65,000
- Executive suites: 70
- Roof: Retractable
- Surface: Grass
- Record attendance: 62,000 (Metallica; 22 May 2026)
- Field size: 105 by 68 metres (344.5 ft × 223.1 ft)
- Public transit: Frankfurt Stadion; 21 Stadion; 61 Stadion

Construction
- Groundbreaking: 1921
- Built: 1921–1925
- Opened: 21 May 1925; 101 years ago
- Renovated: 1937, 1953, 1972, 2005
- Cost: € 150 million
- Architects: Gerkan, Marg and Partners; Max Bögl

Tenants
- Eintracht Frankfurt (1925–present); Germany national football team (selected matches); Frankfurt Galaxy (1991–2007): Major sporting events hosted; 1974 FIFA World Cup; 1980 UEFA Cup final; UEFA Euro 1988; 2005 FIFA Confederations Cup; 2006 FIFA World Cup; 2011 FIFA Women's World Cup; UEFA Euro 2024; 2027 UEFA Europa League final; UEFA Women's Euro 2029

Website
- www.deutschebankpark.de

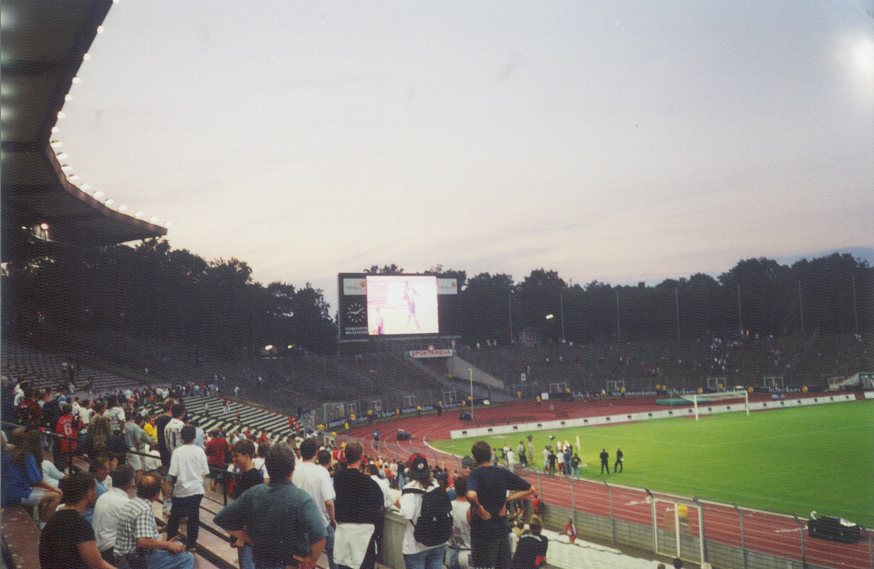
The old Waldstadion prior to the latest reconstruction

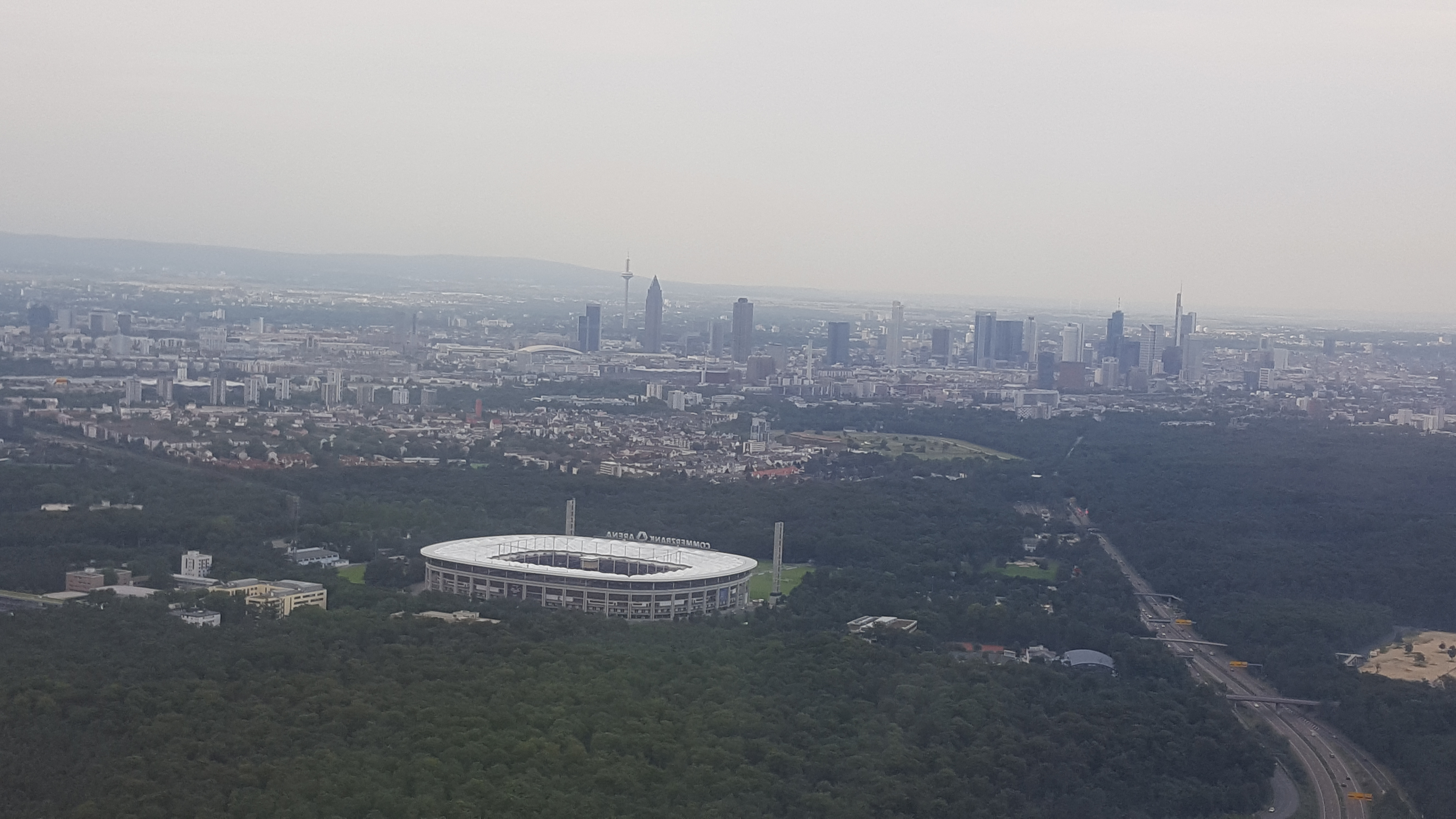
Stadium from the air (2017)

Waldstadion (German pronunciation: [ˈvalt.ʃtaːdi̯ɔn], Forest Stadium), currently known as Deutsche Bank Park for sponsorship purposes, is a retractable roof sports stadium in Frankfurt, Germany. The home stadium of the football club Eintracht Frankfurt, it was opened in 1925. The stadium has been upgraded several times since then; the most recent remodelling was its redevelopment as a football-only stadium in preparation for the 2005 FIFA Confederations Cup and 2006 FIFA World Cup. With a capacity of 60,100 spectators for league matches, it is the sixth largest football stadium in Germany. The stadium was one of the nine venues of 2011 FIFA Women's World Cup, and hosted four matches including the final. It also hosted five matches of the UEFA Euro 2024. The 2027 UEFA Europa League final will be played at the stadium.

The sports complex, which is owned by the city of Frankfurt, includes the actual stadium and other sports facilities, including a swimming pool, a tennis complex, a beach volleyball court and a winter sports hall. The arena has its own railway station, Frankfurt Stadion, on the national rail network.

In 2023, it hosted two regular season National Football League (NFL) American football games as part of the NFL Germany Games.

== History ==
=== First stadium ===
The original stadium was opened on 21 May 1925, after four years of construction, its total cost having been 3.7 million marks (equivalent to €14 million today). The site of a former military shooting range was chosen as the location of the sports park, which also included a fairground and integrated cycling and swimming stadium was designed. The stadium had a capacity of 35,000 spectators. The grandstands consisted mainly of earthworks, including the former bullet trap for the south grandstand. Only the grandstand on the north side was made of reinforced concrete and had a facade modeled on an ancient Greek theater.

The Waldstadion's first major national event was the final of the German football championship on June 7, 1925. 1. FC Nürnberg defeated local club FSV Frankfurt 1:0. Between 24 and 28 July 1925, the Waldstadion hosted the 1925 Workers' Summer Olympiad. The football final between Germany and Finland was played in front of a crowd of 40,000 spectators. In 1937, the spectator capacity through expansion of the back straight was increased to 55,000.

=== The first modification and the introduction of the Bundesliga ===
The first major changes to the stadium were made following a game between Eintracht Frankfurt and 1. FC Nürnberg in May 1953. Almost 70,000 tickets were sold for a stadium envisioned for only 55,000 spectators, and 200 fans were injured as thousands tried to force entry.

The renovated and enlarged Waldstadion was reopened on 14 May 1955 after 19 months of construction work. The stadium once more hosted national team matches as well as some important games for Eintracht Frankfurt, who reached the final round of the German National Championships in 1959. During the run to the final, 81,000 watched Eintracht beat FK Pirmasens – an attendance record that still stands.

In December 1960, an ice rink was opened within the oval of the velodrome. Here, the ice hockey team of Eintracht Frankfurt played their home games until 1981. In 1960 the stadium was given floodlights.

The first Bundesliga game in the Waldstadion took place on 24 August 1963 – a 1–1 draw with 1. FC Kaiserslautern on the first day of the new German national league.

The stadium hosted the World Championships in track cycling in 1966 and the heavyweight boxing championship between Muhammad Ali and Karl Mildenberger on 10 September 1966, won by Ali with a knockout in the 12th round in front of 22,000 spectators.

=== Second reconstruction ===
The second major renovation of the Waldstadion was needed for the 1974 FIFA World Cup. From May 1972 to January 1974, the stadium was rebuilt virtually from scratch to meet the comfort and safety requirements of the World Cup venues. The opening ceremony of the 1974 World Cup was held at the Waldstadion.

In 1978, improved drainage and undersoil heating were installed.

The first final of the newly introduced Women's European Cup was held at the stadium in May 2002, and the home team of 1. FFC Frankfurt beat Swedish side Umeå IK 2–0 to lift the trophy.

== Current stadium ==
=== Current usage ===
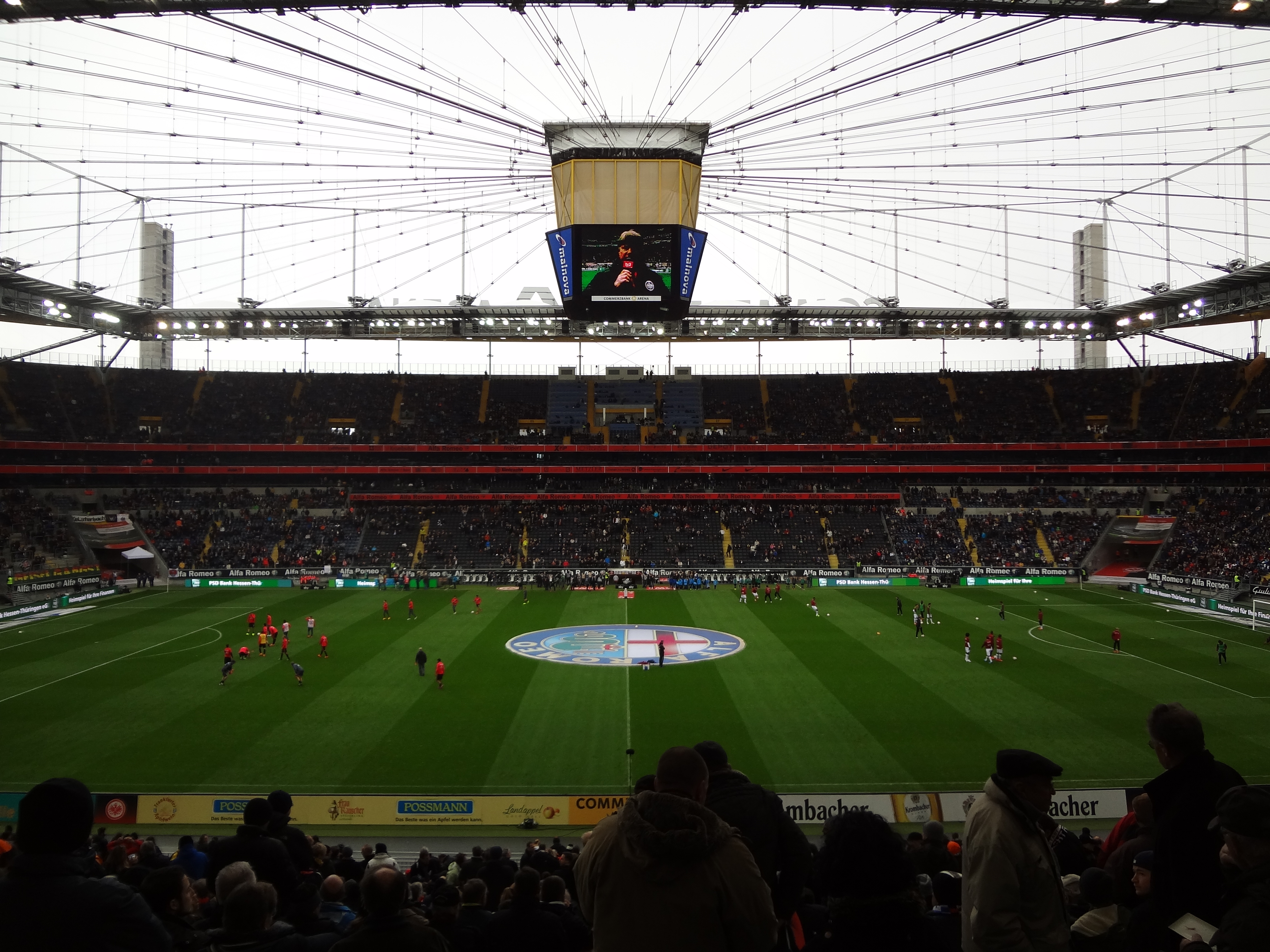
Interior view during a Bundesliga match

The new Waldstadion is primarily designed as a football stadium, but can be used for other turf sports like American football and major events. The grandstand offers rooms that are for meetings, conventions and other events in external markets.

The renovated stadium was officially opened at the 2005 FIFA Confederations Cup, the test run for the 2006 World Cup. Both the opening match (Germany 4–3 Australia) and the final (Brazil 4–1 Argentina) were hosted at the stadium.

==== Football ====
The main user of the stadium is the football team Eintracht Frankfurt, which has used the stadium as its home base since 1963.

In addition, the stadium also serves occasionally as an alternative venue for home games of other teams: 1. FSV Mainz 05 played their qualifying matches for the 2005–06 UEFA Cup against the Armenian representatives Mika and against Keflavík ÍF from Iceland and for the 1st Round proper against Sevilla FC in the Commerzbank Arena.

The women of the local football team 1. FFC Frankfurt defeated Umeå IK 3–2 in the stadium on 24 May 2008 in the final second leg of UEFA Women's Cup, winning the European Cup for the third time and setting up a record for women's club football of 27,500 spectators.

The Turkish Football Federation has also staged several games in the arena, as Turks form a significant ethnic minority in Germany. Beşiktaş won the Turkish Super Cup with a 1–0 win over Galatasaray. Due to the suspension by UEFA of the Turkish national stadium, the qualifying matches for UEFA Euro 2008 against Malta (final score 2–0 to Turkey), against Moldova (5–0 for the Turks) and against Norway (final score 2–2) were also played here.

==== American football ====
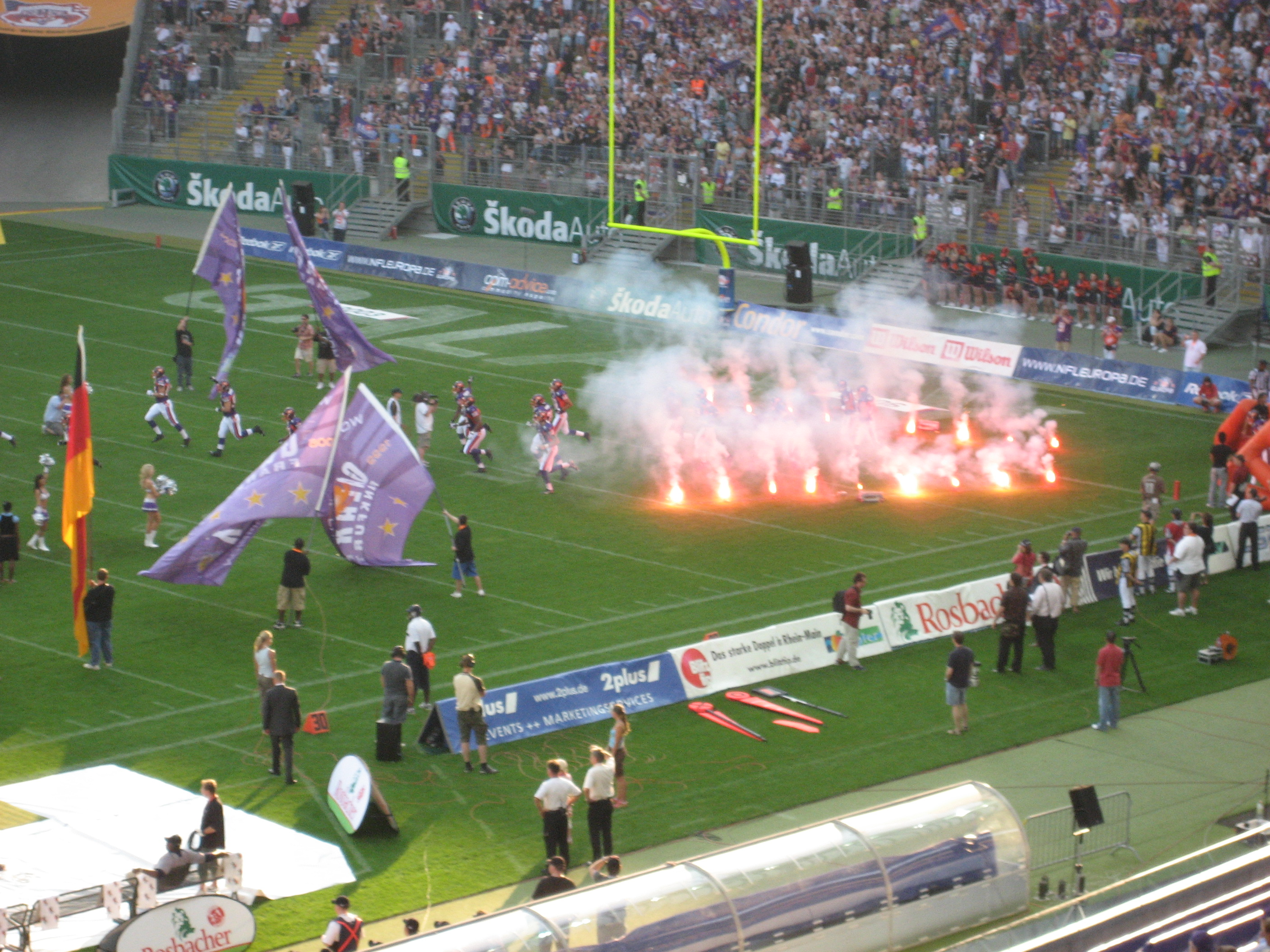
A home game of the American football team Frankfurt Galaxy

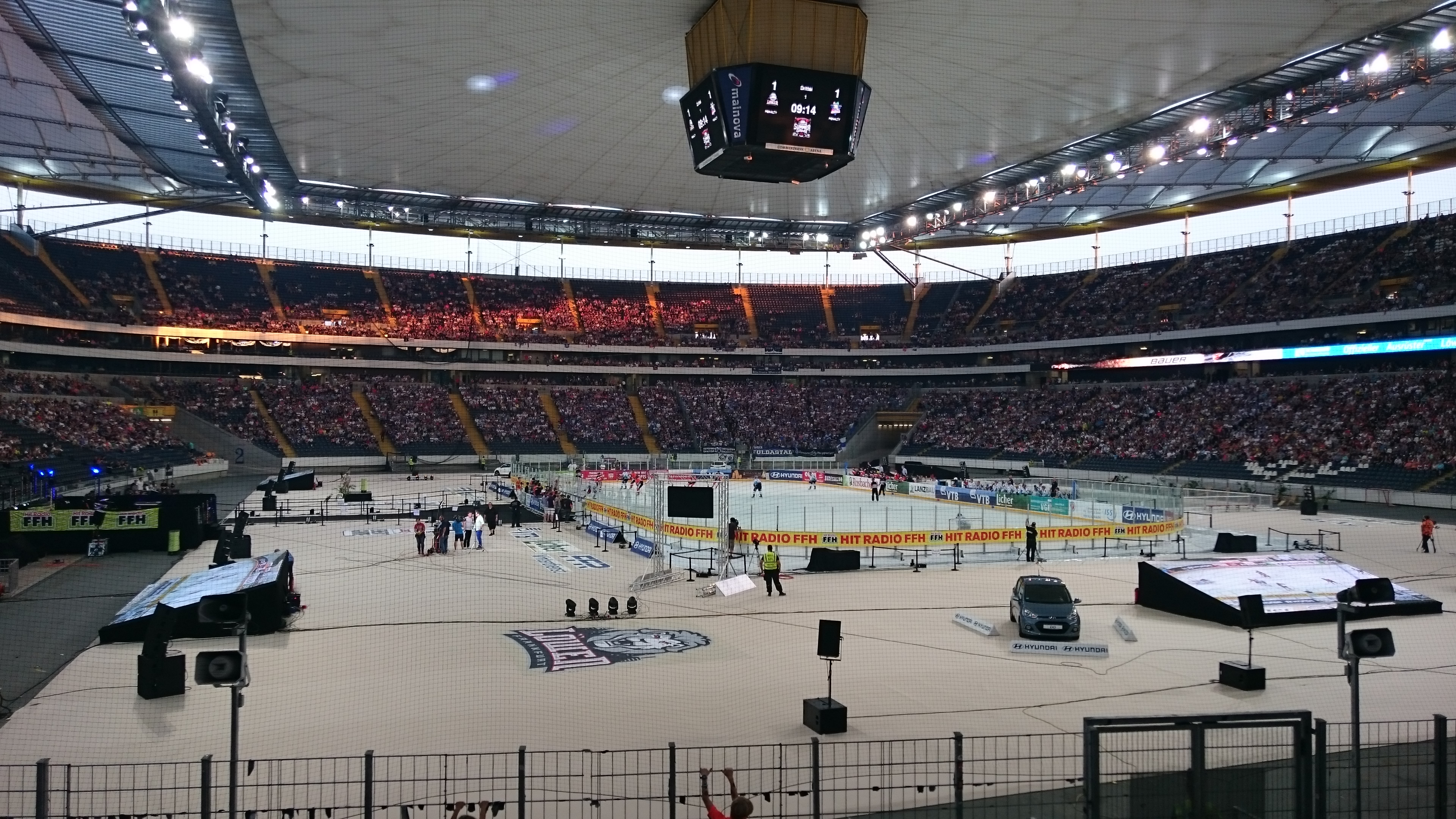
An ice hockey game in the arena

The Waldstadion from 1991 to 2007, with a few interruptions, was home stadium for the NFL Europa's Frankfurt Galaxy American football team. The stadium hosted the World Bowl '98, World Bowl 2000 and World Bowl XV in 2007.

Since 2008, the ground has hosted the final of the German Bowl and the final match of the German Football League. An average of around 15,000 fans watched the 2008 and 2009 finals.

The NFL planned for two regular season games to be played in the stadium in 2023 and 2025, as part of the league's International Series. The 2023 matchups featured the Kansas City Chiefs playing the Miami Dolphins on 5 November, which the Chiefs won 21–14; and the New England Patriots playing the Indianapolis Colts on 12 November, which the Colts won 10–6.

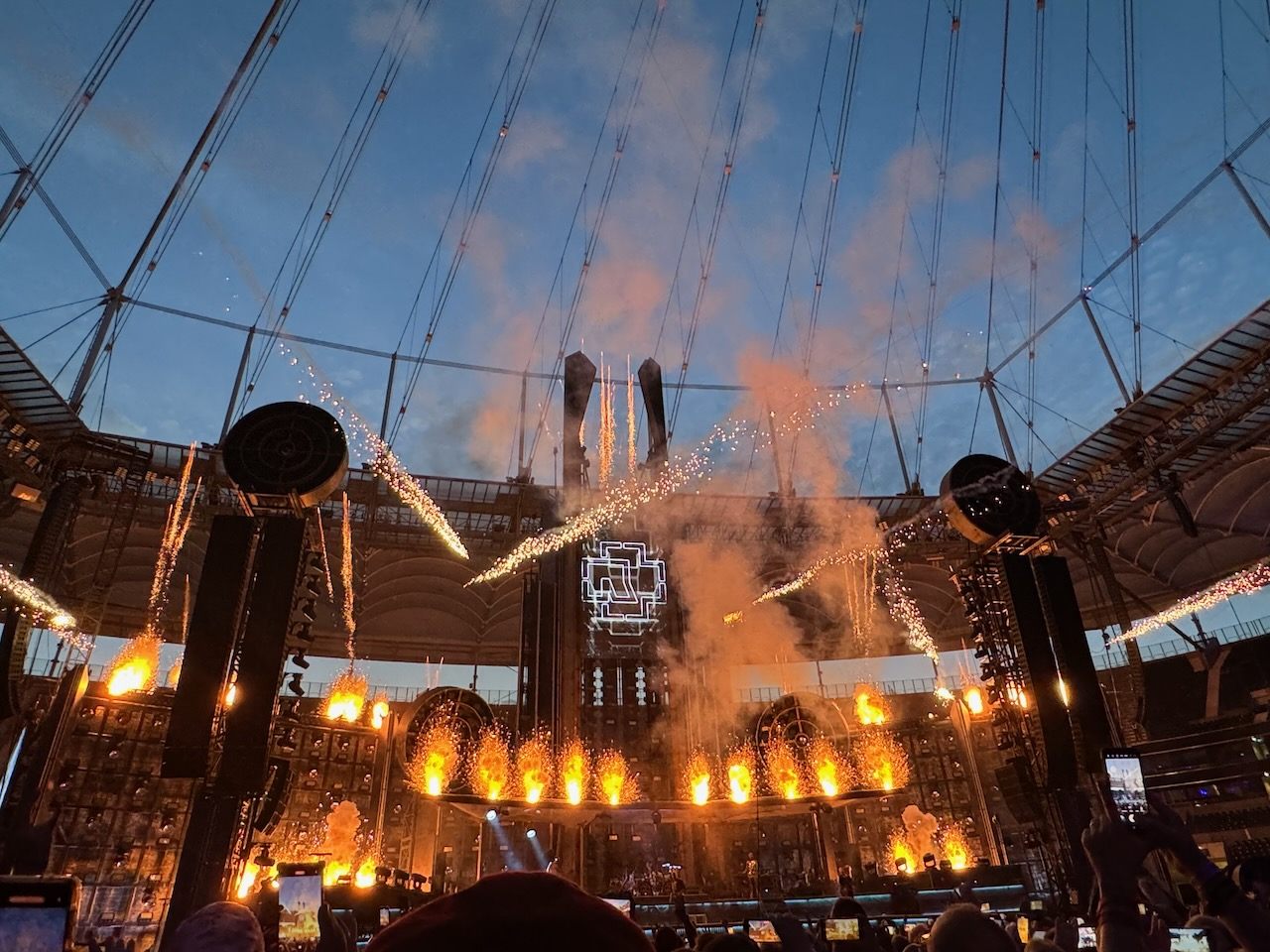
Rammstein performs at Deutsche Bank Park, Frankfurt Germany 11 July 2024

==== Concerts ====
Concerts at the Waldstadion
Date(s)	Performer(s)	Opening act(s)	Tour / Event	Attendance	Revenue	Ref.
15 June 1985	Bruce Springsteen; E Street Band	—N/a	Born in the U.S.A. Tour	—N/a	—N/a	
12 July 1988	Bruce Springsteen; E Street Band	—N/a	Tunnel of Love Express Tour	51,700	—N/a	
26 May 1990	The Rolling Stones	Gun	Urban Jungle Tour	—N/a	—N/a	
27 May 1990	The Rolling Stones	Gun	Urban Jungle Tour	—N/a	—N/a	
28 August 1992	Michael Jackson	Kriss Kross, Rozalla, TLC	Dangerous World Tour	60,000		→
2 June 1993	U2	Stereo MCs, Die Toten Hosen	Zoo TV Tour	50,000		
25 June 1993	Guns N' Roses	Brian May Band, Suicidal Tendencies	Use Your Illusion Tour			
27 July 2000	Tina Turner	Joe Cocker	Twenty Four Seven Tour	51,460 / 51,460	$1,926,238	
12 July 2001	AC/DC	Die Toten Hosen	Stiff Upper Lip World Tour	51,460 / 51,460	$1,926,238	
5 June 2007	Herbert Grönemeyer	—N/a	12 Open Air Tour	69,636 / 76,524	$3,788,010	
6 June 2007	Herbert Grönemeyer	—N/a	12 Open Air Tour	69,636 / 76,524	$3,788,010	
13 June 2007	The Rolling Stones	Starsailor	A Bigger Bang	—N/a		
5 July 2007	Genesis	—N/a	Turn It On Again: The Tour	44,040 / 44,040	$3,610,047	
3 June 2008	Bon Jovi	Gianna Nannini	Lost Highway Tour	37,187 / 37,187	$2,985,360	
14 June 2008	Celine Dion	—N/a	Taking Chances World Tour	15,333 / 18,000	$2,206,722	
9 September 2008	Madonna	Robyn	Sticky & Sweet Tour	39,543 / 39,543	$6,020,706	
12 June 2009	Depeche Mode	M83	Tour of the Universe	42,000	—N/a	
3 July 2009	Bruce Springsteen; E Street Band	—N/a	Working on a Dream Tour	40,471 / 40,471	$3,765,940	
10 August 2010	U2	Kasabian	U2 360° Tour	53,825 / 53,825	$5,544,868	
11 June 2011	Herbert Grönemeyer	Norman Sinn	Schiffsverkehr Tour	—N/a		
25 May 2012	Bruce Springsteen; E Street Band	—N/a	Wrecking Ball World Tour	40,219 / 40,219	$3,759,361	
2 June 2012	Gotthard	Unisonic	Firebirth World Tour	—N/a		
5 June 2013	Depeche Mode	Trentemøller	The Delta Machine Tour	40,960 / 40,960	$3,295,523	
9 August 2013	Roger Waters	—N/a	The Wall Live	26,422 / 29,000	$3,292,846	
8 June 2014	Justin Timberlake	DJ Freestyle	The 20/20 Experience World Tour	38,646 / 38,646	$3,841,803	
10 June 2015	Helene Fischer	Glasperlenspiel	Farbenspiel Live	36,000 / 36,000	—N/a	
3 July 2015	Manfred Mann's Earth Band; Floyd Reloaded	—N/a	Rockclassics in Concert	—N/a		
25 May 2016	Goran Bregović; Bijelo Dugme	Alen Islamović; Tifa	The "Balkan Rolling Stones" Live in Frankfurt	—N/a		
17 July 2016	Rihanna	Big Sean; DJ Mustard; Bibi Bourelly	Anti World Tour	—N/a		
29 July 2016	Beyoncé	Chloe x Halle; Ingrid	The Formation World Tour	36,647 / 36,647	$3,739,440	
3 September 2016	Billy Joel	—N/a	Billy Joel in Concert	31,718 / 31,718	$3,821,370	
9 June 2017	Hans Zimmer	—N/a	Hans Zimmer Live on Tour	—	—	
20 June 2017	Depeche Mode	Algiers	Global Spirit Tour	41,483 / 41,483	$3,417,345	
30 June 2017	Coldplay	Tove Lo; Femme Schmidt	A Head Full of Dreams Tour	87,833 / 87,833	$9,018,910	
1 July 2017	Coldplay	Tove Lo; Femme Schmidt	A Head Full of Dreams Tour	87,833 / 87,833	$9,018,910	
19 July 2017	Robbie Williams	Erasure	The Heavy Entertainment Show Tour	—	—	
20 July 2018	Helene Fischer	Ben Zucker	Die Stadion-Tour 2018	40,488 / 40,488	$3,135,970	
1 June 2019	Andreas Gabalier		Stadion Tour 2019	—	—	
28 June 2019	Pur		Zwischen den Welten Open Air Tour 2019	—	—	
13 July 2019	Rammstein		Rammstein Stadium Tour	40,976 / 40,976	$4,613,467	
22 July 2019	Pink	Vance Joy; Bang Bang Romeo; KidCutUp	Beautiful Trauma World Tour	39,743 / 39,743	$4,261,701	
9 September 2019	Herbert Grönemeyer		Tumult Tour 2019	40,000 / 40,000	—	
2 July 2022	Coldplay	H.E.R.	Music of the Spheres World Tour	138,282 / 138,282	$13,745,935	
3 July 2022	Coldplay	H.E.R.	Music of the Spheres World Tour	138,282 / 138,282	$13,745,935	
5 July 2022	Coldplay	H.E.R.	Music of the Spheres World Tour	138,282 / 138,282	$13,745,935	
23 September 2022	Ed Sheeran	Griff; Cat Burns	+–=÷× Tour	182,856 / 184,201	$13,452,253	
24 September 2022	Ed Sheeran	Griff; Cat Burns	+–=÷× Tour	182,856 / 184,201	$13,452,253	
25 September 2022	Ed Sheeran	Griff; Cat Burns	+–=÷× Tour	182,856 / 184,201	$13,452,253	
24 June 2023	Beyoncé		Renaissance World Tour	42,280 / 42,280	$5,852,675	
29 June 2023	Depeche Mode		Memento Mori World Tour			
5 July 2023	Harry Styles	Wet Leg	Love On Tour	90,976 / 90,976	$9,834,218	
6 July 2023	Harry Styles	Wet Leg	Love On Tour	90,976 / 90,976	$9,834,218	
14 July 2023	The Weeknd	Kaytranada; Mike Dean	After Hours til Dawn Tour	47,169 / 47,169	$4,577,212	
11 July 2024	Rammstein	Abélard	Rammstein Stadium Tour			
12 July 2024	Rammstein	Abélard	Rammstein Stadium Tour			
13 July 2024	Rammstein	Abélard	Rammstein Stadium Tour			
13 June 2025	Chris Brown	Bryson Tiller	Breezy Bowl XX	-	-	
4 July 2025	Kendrick Lamar; SZA	Mustard	Grand National Tour	-	-	
8 July 2025	Linkin Park	Architects; JPEGMafia	From Zero World Tour	-	-	
9 July 2025	Linkin Park	Architects; JPEGMafia	From Zero World Tour	-	-	
15 July 2025	Stray Kids		Dominate World Tour	-	-	
25 July 2025	Iron Maiden	Avatar	Run for Your Lives World Tour	-	-	
10 August 2025	Robbie Williams	The Lottery Winners	Britpop Tour	-	-	
22 May 2026	Metallica	Gojira; Knocked Loose	M72 World Tour	-	-	
24 May 2026	Metallica	Pantera; Avatar	M72 World Tour	-	-	
30 July 2026	The Weeknd	Playboi Carti	After Hours til Dawn Tour	-	-	
31 July 2026	The Weeknd	Playboi Carti	After Hours til Dawn Tour	-	-	
1 August 2026	The Weeknd	Playboi Carti	After Hours til Dawn Tour	-	-	

=== Naming rights ===
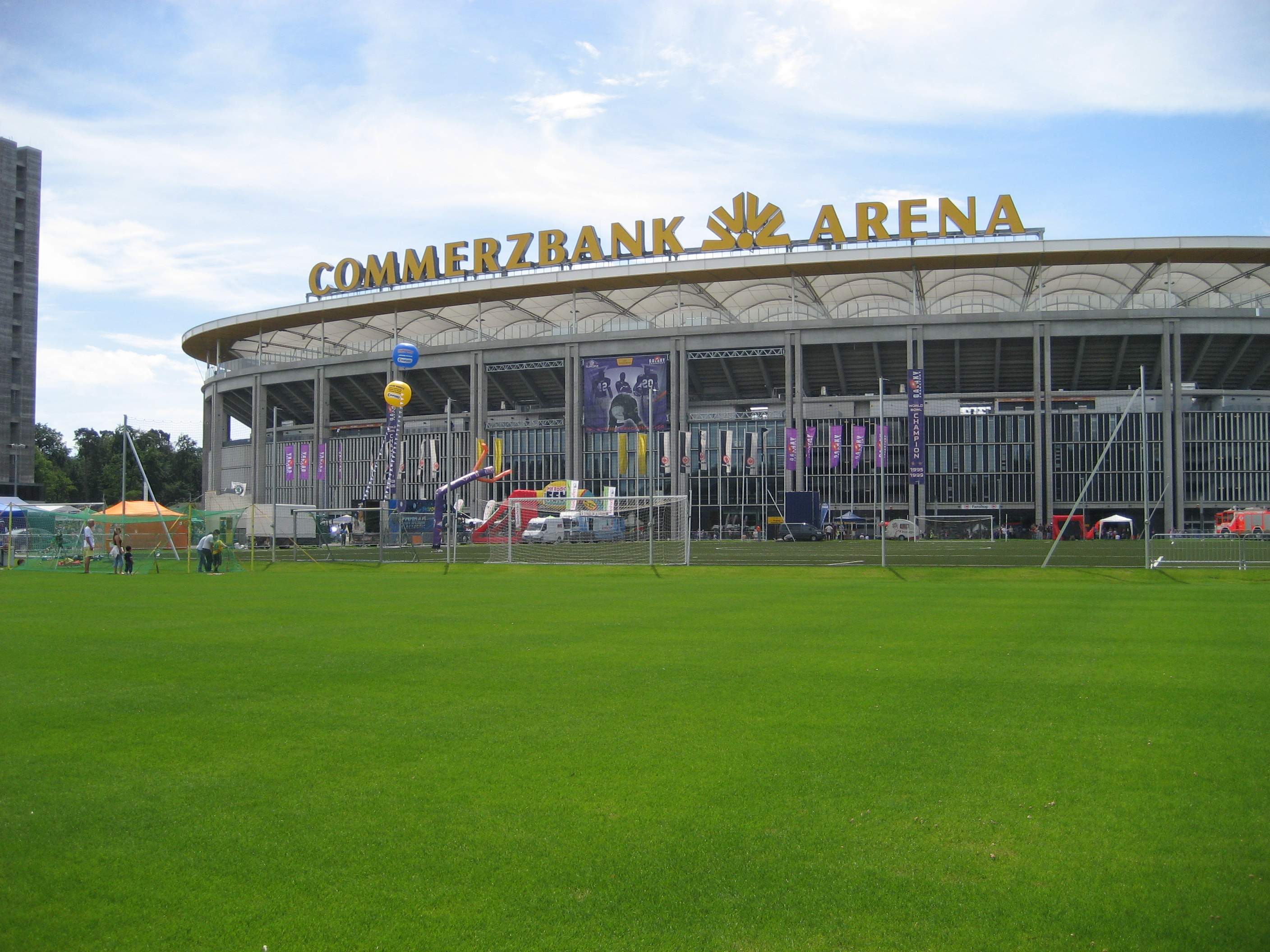
Exterior view (2007), with old Commerzbank arena logo

As part of a naming sponsorship by Commerzbank AG, the Waldstadion was renamed the Commerzbank-Arena on 1 May 2005 for ten years. Commerzbank agreed to pay around €30 million to the city hosting company as part of the deal. During the 2005 FIFA Confederations Cup and the 2006 FIFA World Cup, the stadium was officially referred to as the FIFA World Cup Stadium Frankfurt, as FIFA rules do not permit commercial naming of stadia.

Commerzbank allowed the sponsorship contract to expire on 30 June 2020, after 15 years. The new name sponsor as of 1 July 2020 is Deutsche Bank, with whom a contract has been concluded until 30 June 2027, with an option to extend. Since 1 July 2020, the stadium is officially called Deutsche Bank Park.

== International Football Tournaments ==
=== 1974 FIFA World Cup ===
Date	Time (CET)	Team #1	Result	Team #2	Round	Spectators
13 June 1974	17:00	Brazil	0–0	Yugoslavia	Group 2	59,000
18 June 1974	19:30	Scotland	0–0	Brazil	Group 2	62,000
22 June 1974	19:30	Scotland	1–1	Yugoslavia	Group 2	56,000
30 June 1974	16:00	Poland	2–1	Yugoslavia	Second Round – Group B	58,000
3 July 1974	16:30	Poland	0–1	West Germany	Second Round – Group B	62,000

=== UEFA Euro 1988 ===
Date	Time (CET)	Team #1	Result	Team #2	Round	Spectators
14 June 1988	20:15	Italy	1–0	Spain	Group 1	47,506
18 June 1988	15:30	England	1–3	Soviet Union	Group 2	48,335

=== 2005 FIFA Confederations Cup ===
Date	Time (CET)	Team #1	Result	Team #2	Round	Spectators
15 June 2005	21:00	Germany	4–3	Australia	Group A	46,466
19 June 2005	18:00	Greece	0–1	Japan	Group B	34,314
22 June 2005	20:45	Greece	0–0	Mexico	Group B	31,285
29 June 2005	20:45	Brazil	4–1	Argentina	Final	45,591

=== 2006 FIFA World Cup ===
Date	Time (CET)	Team #1	Result	Team #2	Round	Spectators
10 June 2006	15:00	England	1–0	Paraguay	Group B	48,000
13 June 2006	15:00	South Korea	2–1	Togo	Group G	48,000
17 June 2006	15:00	Portugal	2–0	Iran	Group D	48,000
21 June 2006	21:00	Netherlands	0–0	Argentina	Group C	48,000
1 July 2006	21:00	Brazil	0–1	France	Quarter-finals	48,000

=== 2011 FIFA Women's World Cup ===
Date	Time (CET)	Team #1	Result	Team #2	Round	Spectators
30 June 2011	20:45	Germany	1–0	Nigeria	Group A	48,817
6 July 2011	18:00	Equatorial Guinea	0–3	Brazil	Group D	35,859
13 July 2011	20:45	Japan	3–1	Sweden	Semifinal	45,434
17 July 2011	20:45	Japan	2–2 (3–1 pen.)	United States	Final	48,817

=== UEFA Euro 2024 ===
Date	Time (CET)	Team #1	Result	Team #2	Round	Spectators
17 June 2024	18:00	Belgium	0–1	Slovakia	Group E	45,181
20 June 2024	18:00	Denmark	1–1	England	Group C	46,177
23 June 2024	21:00	Switzerland	1–1	Germany	Group A	46,685
26 June 2024	18:00	Slovakia	1–1	Romania	Group E	45,033
1 July 2024	21:00	Portugal	0–0 (3–0 pen.)	Slovenia	Round of 16	46,576

== See also ==
- List of football stadiums in Germany
- Arena Națională
- Kazimierz Górski National Stadium
- Lists of stadiums

Preceded by Estadio Azteca; Mexico City	FIFA World Cup; Opening Venue; 1974	Succeeded by Monumental de Nuñez; Buenos Aires
Preceded by Stade de France; Saint-Denis	FIFA Confederations Cup; Final venue 2005	Succeeded by Ellis Park Stadium; Johannesburg
Preceded by Hongkou Stadium; Shanghai	FIFA Women's World Cup; Final Venue; 2011	Succeeded by BC Place; Vancouver
