= Iivari Rötkö =

Finnish long-distance runner

Personal information
- Born: 26 January 1893 Grand Duchy of Finland
- Died: 1957 (aged 64) Finland

Sport
- Sport: Athletics
- Event: Long-distance running
- Club: Jyry Helsinki (–1930); Toverit Helsinki (1931–1932)

Achievements and titles
- Personal best(s): 10,000 m – 31:57.4 (1926); 25,000 m – 1:25:14 (1928); Marathon – 2:34:25 (1926)

Iivari (Ivar) Rötkö, born 26 January 1893, died 1957, was a Finnish long-distance runner. He was the holder of the 25,000 meter run world record and the 1926 best year performance in marathon.

== Career ==
Rötkö won the 25,000-metre race at the 1925 Workers' Summer Olympiad in Frankfurt am Main. In September 1926 he ran the best marathon performance of the season, 2:34:25. Rötkö was also ranked fourth in the 10,000-metre run, preceded by the Finns Paavo Nurmi and Eino Rastas and the Chilean Manuel Plaza. In 1928, Rötkö set the world record 1:25:14 in 25,000 metres. He was one of the favourites to win the marathon at the 1928 Summer Spartakiad in Moscow, but the Finnish authorities denied his passport application.

Three years later Rötkö defected from the left-wing Finnish Workers' Sports Federation (TUL) to the bourgeois Finnish National Sports Federation (SVUL) in order to race the marathon at the 1932 Summer Olympics in Los Angeles. At the time, the sports in Finland was split in two, the TUL and SVUL athletes did not compete with each other and the Finnish Olympic Team was composed of SVUL athletes only. Rötkö failed to enter the Olympics as he completed fifth in the qualifications and soon decided to end his career at the age of 39.
