= Latvia national football team results (1922–1940) =

This article provides details of international football games played by the Latvia national football team from 1922 to 1940.

During this period, they only competed in one major tournament, the 1924 Summer Olympics in Paris, in which they were knocked-out in the first round by the hosts France. They also played the inaugural edition of the Baltic Cup in 1928, which they won, going on to claim a further three titles in the 1930s (1932, 1936, and 1937).

== 1920s ==
=== 1922 ===
24 September Friendly	Latvia	1–1	Estonia	Riga, Latvia
16:00 UTC+1:30	Barda 2'	Report1; Report2	Üpraus 88'	Stadium: LSB Stadions; Attendance: 3,000; Referee: Verner Eklöf (Finland)

=== 1923 ===
24 July Friendly	Estonia	1–1	Latvia	Tallinn, Estonia
18:00 UTC+2	Paal 3'	Report1; Report2	Barda 65'	Stadium: Kalevi staadion Attendance: 4,000; Referee: Gunnar Sund (Sweden)

=== 1924 ===
27 May 1924 Summer Olympics	France	7–0	Latvia	Saint-Ouen, France
	Crut 17', 28', 55'; Nicolas 25', 50'; Boyer 71', 87'	Report; Report		Stadium: Stade de Paris; Attendance: 15,000; Referee: Henri Christophe (Belgium)

22 June Friendly	Latvia	1–3	Turkey	Riga, Latvia
	Bārda 56'	Report	11', 16', 68' Sporel	Stadium: LSB Stadions; Attendance: 5,000; Referee: August Silber-Sillak (Estonia)

14 August Friendly	Latvia	0–2	Finland	Riga, Latvia
18:00	Fallström 13'; Koponen 26'	Report		Stadium: LSB Stadions; Attendance: 4,000; Referee: Heinrich Plhak (Austria)

16 August 1924 Friendly	Lithuania	2–4	Latvia	Kaunas, Lithuania
16:30 (UTC+2:00)	Nopensas 17', 88'	Report	Stančiks 2'; A. Bārda 22'; Ābrams 34'; Plade 40' (pen.)	Stadium: Lietuvos Fizinio Lavinimosi Sąjunga Stadionas; Attendance: 5,000; Referee: August Silber (Estonia)

18 October Friendly	Latvia	2–0	Estonia	Riga, Latvia
15:30 UTC+1:30	Abrams 28'; Barda 33'	Report1; Report2		Stadium: Riga ASK Stadions; Attendance: 5,000; Referee: David Grünbaum (Austria)

=== 1925 ===
9 August Friendly	Finland	3–1	Latvia	Helsinki, Finland
18:00 (UTC+2); Match 57	Eklöf 74'; Fallström 79', 85'	Report	Tauriņš 72'	Stadium: Töölön Pallokenttä; Attendance: 2,000; Referee: Theodor Malm (Sweden)

26 August Friendly	Estonia	2–2	Latvia	Tallinn, Estonia
18:00 UTC+2	Pihlak 85' (pen.), 89' (pen.)	Report1; Report2	Taurinš 9', 19'	Stadium: Kalevi staadion Attendance: 4,000; Referee: Imre Józsa (Hungary)

20 September 1925 Friendly	Latvia	2–2	Lithuania	Riga, Latvia
15:30 (UTC+1:37)	E. Bārda 23', 85'	Report	S. Sabaliauskas 15'; Žukauskas 55'	Stadium: Armijas Sporta Klub Stadions; Attendance: 2,500; Referee: August Silber (Estonia)

=== 1926 ===
20 July Friendly	Latvia	4–1	Sweden	Riga, Latvia
18:30 (UTC+2:00)	Strazdiņš 6'; Šeibelis 41' (pen.); Tauriņš 47'; Pavlovs 66'	Report	Hedström 3'	Stadium: LSB Stadions; Attendance: 5,000; Referee: Alexander McKibbin (Estonia)

12 August Friendly	Latvia	1–4	Finland	Riga, Latvia
18:30	Strazdiņš 87'	Report	Koponen 13', 20'; Silve 25'; Lönnberg 74'	Stadium: LSB Stadions; Attendance: 4,000; Referee: August Silber (Estonia)

21 August 1926 Friendly	Lithuania	2-3	Latvia	Kaunas, Lithuania
17:00 (UTC+2:00)	S. Sabaliauskas 22' (pen.); Žebrauskas 49'	Report	Pavlovs 27', 86'; Stančiks 56'	Stadium: Makabi Stadionas; Attendance: 2,500; Referee: Otto Silber (Estonia)

19 September Friendly	Latvia	0–1	Estonia	Riga, Latvia
16:00 UTC+2		Report1; Report2	Eelma 70'	Stadium: ASK Stadions; Attendance: 5,000; Referee: Julius Zwicker (Austria)

=== 1927 ===
29 May Friendly	Sweden	12–0	Latvia	Stockholm, Sweden
14:30 UTC+1	Hallbäck 9', 30', 31', 44', 77', 84'; Rydell 11', 65', 85'; Johansson 40'; Kaufeldt 48'; Andersson 80'	Report		Stadium: Stockholm Olympic Stadium; Attendance: 19,000; Referee: Peco Bauwens (Germany)

16 June Friendly	Estonia	4–1	Latvia	Tallinn, Estonia
19:00 UTC+2	Eelma 5'; Pihlak 20', 34' (pen.); Stanciks 69' (o.g.)	Report1; Report2	Urbans 17'	Stadium: Kadriorg Stadium; Attendance: 4,000; Referee: Gunnar Sund (Sweden)

27 July 1927 Friendly	Latvia	6-3	Lithuania	Riga, Latvia
18:30 (UTC+2:00)	Žins 17', 58', 89'; Plade 8', 57'; Bradiņš 39'	Report	Marcinkus 40'; Blatas 63'; Trumpjonas 72'	Stadium: A.S.K. Stadions; Attendance: 3,500; Referee: Karel Kettner (Czechoslovakia)

11 September Friendly	Finland	3–1	Latvia	Helsinki, Finland
13:00 (UTC+2); Match 57	Koponen 40'; Lauks 41' (o.g.); Fallström 74'	Report	Šeibelis 49'	Stadium: Töölön Pallokenttä; Attendance: 2,500; Referee: Heinrich Paal (Estonia)

25 September Friendly	Latvia	4–1	Estonia	Riga, Latvia
16:00 UTC+2	Žins 23'; Urbans 33'; Plade 51', 53'	Report1; Report2	Pihlak 62'	Stadium: LSB Stadions; Attendance: 3,500; Referee: Ernst Thomaschky (Germany)

=== 1928 ===
6 July Friendly	Latvia	0–4	Sweden	Riga, Latvia
19:00 (UTC+2:00)		Report	Lööf 14', 17', 35'; Pettersson 25'	Stadium: LSB Stadions; Attendance: 4,000; Referee: Ernst Thomaschky (Germany)

25 July 1928 1928 Baltic Cup	Lithuania	0-3	Latvia	Tallinn, Estonia
18:30 (UTC+2:00)		Report	Vaters 25', 66'; Pavlovs 2'	Stadium: Kadrioru Staadion; Attendance: 2,000; Referee: Gustaf Ekberg (Sweden)

27 July 1928 Baltic Cup	Estonia	0–1	Latvia	Tallinn, Estonia
18:30 UTC+2		Report1; Report2	Taurinš 63'	Stadium: Kadriorg Stadium; Attendance: 5,000; Referee: Gustaf Ekberg (Sweden)

19 August Friendly	Latvia	2–1	Finland	Riga, Latvia
17:00	Pavlovs 62', 87'	Report	Lönnberg 90' (pen.)	Stadium: LSB Stadions; Attendance: 1,000; Referee: Heinrich Paal (Estonia)

1 September 1928 Friendly	Lithuania	1–1	Latvia	Kaunas, Lithuania
16:00 (UTC+2:00)	Škėma 55'	Report	Urbāns 78'	Stadium: Makabi Stadionas; Attendance: 2,500; Referee: Georg Muntau (Germany)

23 September Friendly	Latvia	1–1	Estonia	Riga, Latvia
16:00 UTC+2	Plade 26'	Report1; Report2	Pihlak 41'	Stadium: LSB Stadions; Attendance: 4,000; Referee: Valerijonas Balčiūnas (Lithuania)

=== 1929 ===
28 July Friendly	Sweden	10–0	Latvia	Malmö, Sweden
18:00 UTC+1	Hallbäck 10', 67'; Rydell 13'; Kroon 15', 63'; Andersson 46', 77', 87'; Helgesson 62'; Nilsson 83'	Report		Stadium: Malmö Idrottsplats; Attendance: 8,944; Referee: Otto Remke (Denmark)

14 August 1929 1929 Baltic Cup	Latvia	3-1	Lithuania	Riga, Latvia
18:00(UTC+2:00)	Plade 51', 68', 86'	Report	Chmelevskis 89' (pen.)	Stadium: L.S.B. Stadions; Attendance: 2,000; Referee: Peco Bauwens (Germany)

16 August 1929 Baltic Cup	Latvia	2–2	Estonia	Riga, Latvia
18:00 UTC+2	Priede 27'; Pavlovs 63'	Report1; Report2	Einman 9'; Eelma 29'	Stadium: LSB Stadions; Attendance: 4,000; Referee: Peco Bauwens (Germany)

15 September Friendly	Finland	3–1	Latvia	Helsinki, Finland
13:00 (UTC+2)	Svanström 10'; Närvänen 13'; Suontausta 17'	Report	Pētersons 43'	Stadium: Töölön Pallokenttä; Attendance: 4,000; Referee: Axel Bergqvist (Sweden)

18 September Friendly	Estonia	4–1	Latvia	Tallinn, Estonia
17:00 UTC+2	Brenner 10'; Eelma 33'; Paal 50'; Pihlak 75'	Report1; Report2	Šeibelis 82' (pen.)	Stadium: Kadriorg Stadium; Attendance: 4,000; Referee: Harry Kuhlberg (Finland)

== 1930s ==
=== 1930 ===
27 June Friendly	Estonia	1–1	Latvia	Tallinn, Estonia
19:00 UTC+2	Brenner 64'	Report1; Report2	Jenihs 30'	Stadium: Kadriorg Stadium; Attendance: 4,000; Referee: Harry Kuhlberg (Finland)

22 July Friendly	Latvia	0–5	Sweden	Riga, Latvia
18:15 (UTC+2:00)		Report	Nilsson 5', 75'; Johansson 14'; Dunker 26', 80'	Stadium: LSB Stadions; Attendance: 5,000; Referee: Heinrich Paal (Estonia)

4 August Friendly	Latvia	3–0	Finland	Riga, Latvia
18:00	Pētersons 4'; Pavlovs 46'; Dambrēvics 69'	Report		Stadium: LSB Stadions; Attendance: 3,000; Referee: Georg Muntau (Germany)

16 August 1930 Baltic Cup	Estonia	2–3	Latvia	Kaunas, Lithuania
17:00 UTC+2	Einman 18'; Karm 38'	Report1; Report2	Petersons 11'; Žins 15'; Dambrevics 56'	Stadium: Makabi Stadium; Attendance: 3,500; Referee: Georg Muntau (Germany)

17 August 1930 1930 Baltic Cup	Lithuania	3-3	Latvia	Kaunas, Lithuania
16:30 (UTC+2:00)	Citavičius 32'; Lingis 46'; Chmelevskis 89'	Report	Pētersons 37', 61', 64'	Stadium: Kariuomenės Stadionas; Attendance: 5,000; Referee: Georg Muntau (Germany)

=== 1931 ===
28 May Friendly	Latvia	0–1	Estonia	Riga, Latvia
19:00 UTC+2		Report1; Report2	Einman 53'	Stadium: LSB Stadions; Attendance: 4,000; Referee: Józef Lustgarten (Poland)

30 June 1931 Friendly	Latvia	5-2	Lithuania	Riga, Latvia
18:30 (UTC+2:00)	Pētersons 16', 33', 56', 59'; Verners 87'	Report	Citavičius 39'; Dirgėla 41'	Stadium: L.S.B. Stadions; Attendance: 3,500; Referee: Heinrich Paal (Estonia)

26 July Friendly	Sweden	6–0	Latvia	Västerås, Sweden
13:30 UTC+1	Sundberg 10', 44', 78'; Roos 12', 25'; Rydell 38', pen.'	Report		Stadium: Arosvallen; Attendance: 7,000; Referee: Reidar Randers Johansen (Norway)

19 August Friendly	Finland	4–0	Latvia	Helsinki, Finland
18:30 (UTC+2); Match 57	Grönlund 11', 23'; Malmgren 15'; Åström 36'	Report		Stadium: Töölön Pallokenttä; Attendance: 3,500; Referee: Heinrich Paal (Estonia)

31 August 1931 1931 Baltic Cup	Latvia	1-0	Lithuania	Tallinn, Estonia
17:30 (UTC+2:00)	Pētersons 11'	Report		Stadium: Kadrioru Staadion; Attendance: 2,000; Referee: Osborn Wenzel (Sweden)

1 September 1931 Baltic Cup	Estonia	3–1	Latvia	Tallinn, Estonia
17:30 UTC+2	Eelma 10'; Karm 51', 67'	Report1; Report2	Škincs 16'	Stadium: Kadriorg Stadium; Attendance: 6,500; Referee: Osborn Wenzel (Sweden)

27 September Friendly	Latvia	2–1	Estonia	Riga, Latvia
16:00 UTC+2	Škincs 67'; Štauvers 90' (pen.)	Report1; Report2	Kass 8'	Stadium: JKS Stadions; Attendance: 3,500; Referee: Józef Lustgarten (Poland)

=== 1932 ===
1 June Friendly	Estonia	3–0	Latvia	Tallinn, Estonia
19:00 UTC+2	Lassner 3'; Eelma 6'; Kass 89'	Report1; Report2		Stadium: Kadriorg Stadium; Attendance: 5,500; Referee: Esko Pekkonen (Finland)

29 June 1932 Friendly	Lithuania	2–3	Latvia	Kaunas, Lithuania
17:40 (UTC+2:00)	Lingis 74' (pen.); Citavičius 88'	Report	Jēnihs 11', 86'; Šeibelis 9'	Stadium: Lietuvos Fizinio Lavinimosi Sąjunga Stadionas; Attendance: 2,000; Referee: Heinrich Paal (Estonia)

13 July Friendly	Latvia	0–0	Sweden	Riga, Latvia
18:30 (UTC+2:00)		Report		Stadium: LSB Stadions; Attendance: 4,000; Referee: Heinrich Paal (Estonia)

24 July 1932 Friendly	Latvia	2–1	Lithuania	Liepāja, Latvia
18:00 (UTC+2:00)	Pētersons 42'; Tauriņš 80'	Report	Lingis 85'	Stadium: Stadions Olimpija; Attendance: 15,000; Referee: Voldemar Rõks (Estonia)

28 August 1932 1932 Baltic Cup	Latvia	4–1	Lithuania	Riga, Latvia
17:30 (UTC+2:00)	Pētersons 52'; Šeibelis 53'; Jēnihs 65'; Tauriņš 73'	Report	Citavičius 15'	Stadium: J.K.S. Stadions; Attendance: 4,000; Referee: Sven Klang (Sweden)

30 August 1932 Baltic Cup	Latvia	1–0	Estonia	Riga, Latvia
18:00 UTC+2	Reinfeldt-Reinlo 58' (o.g.)	Report1; Report2		Stadium: JKS Stadions; Attendance: 5,000; Referee: Sven Klang (Sweden)

11 September 1932 Friendly	Lithuania	1-0	Latvia	Kaunas, Lithuania
	Lingis 30'	Report		Stadium: Lietuvos Fizinio Lavinimosi Sąjunga Stadionas; Attendance: 2,000; Referee: Otto Silber (Estonia)
Note: Antanas Lingis set the goal scoring record for Lithuania (7 goals)

2 October 1932 Friendly	Poland	2–1	Latvia	Warsaw, Poland
15:30	Kossok 52'; Radojewski 89'	Report	Tauriņš 19'	Stadium: Stadion Wojska Polskiego; Attendance: 8,000; Referee: Radu Istrate (Romania)

=== 1933 ===
28 May Friendly	Latvia	2–0	Estonia	Riga, Latvia
12:00 UTC+2	Tauriņš 45'; Pētersons 90'	Report1; Report2		Stadium: JKS Stadions; Attendance: 2,500; Referee: Valerijonas Balčiūnas (Lithuania)

12 June 1933 Friendly	Latvia	6–2	Lithuania	Riga, Latvia
18:30 (UTC+2:00)	Pētersons 9', 74', 74'; Brēde 24'; Šeibelis 34'; Tauriņš 86'	Report	Z. Sabaliauskas 30'; Dirgėla 58'	Stadium: J.K.S. Stadions; Attendance: 3,000; Referee: Heinrich Paal (Estonia)

4 July Friendly	Latvia	1–1	Sweden	Riga, Latvia
18:30 (UTC+2:00)	Pētersons 72'	Report	Hansson 39'	Stadium: LSB Stadions; Attendance: 4,000; Referee: Valerijonas Balčiūnas (Lithuania)

9 August Friendly	Estonia	2–1	Latvia	Tallinn, Estonia
19:00 UTC+2	Eelma 14'; Lassner 83'	Report1; Report2	Šeibelis 50'	Stadium: Kadriorg Stadium; Attendance: 6,000; Referee: Matti Aalto (Finland)

2 September 1933 Baltic Cup	Lithuania	1–1	Estonia	Kaunas, Lithuania
16:30 UTC+2	Citavicius 55'	Report1; Report2	Kuremaa 15'	Stadium: Kariuomenės Stadionas; Attendance: 3,000; Referee: Yrjö Tuhkunen (Finland)

4 September 1933 1933 Baltic Cup	Lithuania	2–2	Latvia	Kaunas, Lithuania
16:00 (UTC+2:00)	Z. Sabaliauskas 33'; Lingis 55'	Report	Pētersons 52', 65'	Stadium: Kariuomenės Stadionas; Attendance: 3,000; Referee: Yrjö Tuhkunen (Finland)

=== 1934 ===
10 June 1934 Friendly	Lithuania	2–0	Latvia	Kaunas, Lithuania
18:00 (UTC+2:00)	Baliulevičius 11', 78'	Report		Stadium: Kariuomenės Stadionas; Attendance: 3,000; Referee: Voldemar Loodla (Estonia)

14 August Friendly	Latvia	1–1	Finland	Riga, Latvia
18:00	Priede 59'	Report	Kylmälä 78'	Stadium: LSB Stadions; Attendance: 3,000; Referee: Valerijonas Balčiūnas (Lithuania)

9 September 1934 Friendly	Latvia	1–3	Lithuania	Riga, Latvia
16:30 (UTC+2:00)	Borduško 37'	Report	Pavlovs 28' (o.g.); Klimas 41'; Bubnovas 75'	Stadium: J.K.S. Stadions; Attendance: 5,000; Referee: Yrjö Tuhkunen (Finland)

23 September Friendly	Sweden	3–1	Latvia	Stockholm, Sweden
14:00 UTC+1	Andersson 64' (pen.); Karlsson 84'; Gustavsson 89'	Report	Jēnihs 4'	Stadium: Stockholms Stadion; Attendance: 16,000; Referee: Poul Dreiøe (Denmark)

14 October 1934 Friendly	Latvia	2–6	Poland	Rīga, Latvia
15:00 (UTC+2:00)	Priede 32'; Jēnihs 33'	Report	Pazurek 9'; Wodarz 14', 64', 75'; Łysakowski 30'; Peterek 45' (pen.)	Stadium: J.K.S. stadion Attendance: 5,000; Referee: Esko Pekonen (Finland)

=== 1935 ===
30 May 1935 Friendly	Latvia	6-1	Lithuania	Riga, Latvia
17:00 (UTC+2:00)	Vītols 30', 63', 77'; Vestermans 75', 79'; Raisters 5'	Report	Bužinskas 80'	Stadium: J.K.S. Stadions; Attendance: 5,000; Referee: Sophus Hansen (Denmark)

6 June Friendly	Finland	4–1	Latvia	Helsinki, Finland
19:00 (UTC+2); Match 57	Kanerva 50' (pen.); Weckström 60', 65'; Lintamo 85'	Report	Vestermans 25'	Stadium: Töölön Pallokenttä; Attendance: 4,000; Referee: Ivan Eklind (Sweden)

12 June Friendly	Latvia	1–1	Estonia	Riga, Latvia
18:30 UTC+2	Rozitis 65'	Report1; Report2	Siimenson 88'	Stadium: JKS Stadions; Attendance: 6,500; Referee: Sophus Hansen (Denmark)

5 July Friendly	Latvia	0–3	Sweden	Riga, Latvia
18:30 (UTC+2:00)		Report	Karlsson 35'; Jonasson 43'; Samuelsson 76'	Stadium: LSB Stadions; Attendance: 7,000; Referee: Gábor Boronkai (Hungary)

21 August 1935 1935 Baltic Cup	Latvia	2–2	Lithuania	Tallinn, Estonia
18:00 (UTC+2:00)	Vestermans 17', 75'	Report	Lingis 33'; Gudelis 48'	Stadium: Kadrioru Staadion; Attendance: 3,500; Referee: Rudolf Eklöw (Sweden)

22 August 1935 Baltic Cup	Estonia	1–1	Latvia	Tallinn, Estonia
18:00 UTC+2	Eelma 64'	Report1; Report2	Petersons 71'	Stadium: Kadriorg Stadium; Attendance: 7,000; Referee: Rudolf Eklöw (Sweden)

8 September 1935 Friendly	Lithuania	2–2	Latvia	Kaunas, Lithuania
16:15 (UTC+2:00)	Lingis 28'; Marcinkus 54'	Report	Lidmanis 12' (pen.); Pētersons 63'	Stadium: Kariuomenės Stadionas; Attendance: 5,000; Referee: Sophus Hansen (Denmark)

15 September 1935 Friendly	Poland	3–3	Latvia	Łódź, Poland
16:00 (+1:00)	Smoczek 47'; Malczyk 54'; Borowski 66'	Report	Škincs 12'; Pētersons 25'; Verners 57'	Stadium: Stadion Miejski; Attendance: 15,000; Referee: Hans Frankenstein (Austria)

13 October Friendly	Germany	3–0	Latvia	Königsberg, Germany
14:30 UTC+1	Lenz 7'; Panse 59'; Langenbein 63'	Report		Stadium: Horst Wessel Stadion; Attendance: 12,000; Referee: Andrzej Rutkowski (Poland)

=== 1936 ===
28 May Friendly	Estonia	3–4	Latvia	Tallinn, Estonia
18:30 UTC+2	Linberg 34'; Siimenson 63'; Kuremaa 82'	Report1; Report2	Borduško 20'; Verners 31', 39'; Rozitis 73'	Stadium: Kadriorg Stadium; Attendance: 5,000; Referee: Saario Mauritz (Finland)

14 June 1936 Friendly	Lithuania	1–5	Latvia	Kaunas, Lithuania
18:00 (UTC+2:00)	Kersnauskas 45'	Report	Šeibelis 24', 76'; Verners 3'; Raisters 48'; Pakalns 53'	Stadium: Kariuomenės Stadionas; Attendance: 3,500; Referee: Rudolf Eklöw (Sweden)

29 August 1936 1936 Baltic Cup	Latvia	2–1	Lithuania	Riga, Latvia
16:30 (UTC+2:00)	Vestermans 75'; Šeibelis 90'	Report	Jaškevičius 27'	Stadium: J.K.S. Stadions; Attendance: 6,000; Referee: Rudolf Eklöw (Sweden)

31 August 1936 Baltic Cup	Latvia	2–1	Estonia	Riga, Latvia
17:30 UTC+2	Šeibelis 35'; Lidmanis 41' (pen.)	Report1; Report2	Kaljo 73' (pen.)	Stadium: JKS Stadions; Attendance: 10,000; Referee: Rudolf Eklöw (Sweden)

6 September 1936 Friendly	Latvia	3–3	Poland	Rīga, Latvia
12:00 (UTC+2:00)	Pētersons 60'; Rozītis 72', 79'	Report	Wostal 20'; Matyas 37'; Schwartz 58'	Stadium: J.K.S. stadion Attendance: 8,000; Referee: Hans Frankenstein (Austria)

=== 1937 ===
25 June Friendly	Latvia	1–3	Sweden	Riga, Latvia
18:30 (UTC+2:00)	Raisters 15'	Report	Hohmann 10'; Berndt 33', 59'	Stadium: LSB Stadions; Attendance: 8,000; Referee: Gustav Krist (Czechoslovakia)

12 July 1937 Friendly	Latvia	0–0	Romania	Rīga, Latvia
		Report		Stadium: A.S.K. [Armijas Sporta Klubs] Stadions; Attendance: 8000; Referee: Gustav Krist (Czechoslovakia)

29 July 1937 1938 WCQ; Group 8 First Round	Latvia	4–2	Lithuania	Riga, Latvia
18:00 (UTC+2:00)	Kaņeps 19', 52'; Vestermans 50'; Borduško 83'	Report	Gudelis 79'; Paulionis 90'	Stadium: A.S.K. Stadions; Attendance: 10,000; Referee: Gustav Krist (Czechoslovkia)

3 September 1937 1938 WCQ; Group 8 First Round & 1937 Baltic Cup	Lithuania	1-5	Latvia	Kaunas, Lithuania
16:00 (UTC+2:00)	Paulionis 72'	Report	Kaņeps 4', 45' (pen.); Borduško 11', 30'; Vestermans 67'	Stadium: Valstybinis Stadionas; Attendance: 8,000; Referee: Hans Frankenstein (Austria)

4 September 1937 Baltic Cup	Estonia	1–1	Latvia	Kaunas, Lithuania
16:00 UTC+2	Kuremaa 68'	Report1; Report2	Vestermans 35'	Stadium: Valstybinis Stadionas; Attendance: 8,000; Referee: Hans Frankenstein (Austria)

7 September 1937 Baltic Cup	Estonia	0–2	Latvia	Kaunas, Lithuania
17:00 UTC+2		Report1; Report2	Rozītis 12'; Vestermans 19'	Stadium: Valstybinis Stadionas; Attendance: 8,000; Referee: Hans Frankenstein (Austria)

19 September Friendly	Latvia	3–1	Estonia	Riga, Latvia
16:00 UTC+2	Rozītis 23'; Kaņeps 28'; Borduško 66'	Report1; Report2	Kuremaa 32'	Stadium: Riia ASK Staddion; Attendance: 12,000; Referee: Alois Beranek (Austria)

5 October 1938 FIFA World Cup qualification	Austria	2–1	Latvia	Vienna, Austria
15:30 (UTC+1:00)	Jerusalem 15'; Binder 33'	Report	Vestermans 6'	Stadium: Praterstadion; Attendance: 16,000; Referee: Pál Hertzka (Hungary)

10 October 1937 Friendly	Poland	2–1	Latvia	Katowice, Poland
15:00 (UTC+1:00)	Pytel 54'; Piec 62'	Report	Rozītis 68'	Stadium: Stadion Pogoni; Attendance: 22,000; Referee: Denis Xifando (Romania)

=== 1938 ===
17 May 1938 Friendly	Lithuania	0–2	Latvia	Kaunas, Lithuania
19:00 (UTC+2:00)		Report	Vanags 73', 88'	Stadium: A.S.K. Stadions; Attendance: 12,000; Referee: Alois Beranek (Austria)

27 June Friendly	Latvia	3–0	Hungary	Rīga, Latvia
19:00 (UTC+2:00)	Borduško 10'; Vanags 16', 75'	Report		Stadium: ASK Riga; Attendance: 13,000; Referee: Matti Aalto (Finland)

20 July Friendly	Estonia	0–2	Latvia	Tallinn, Estonia
19:00 UTC+2		Report1; Report2	Raisters 19'; Vanags 86'	Stadium: Kadriorg Stadium; Attendance: 9,500; Referee: Fritz Bouillon (Germany)

28 August Friendly	Latvia	2–1	Czech Republic	Rīga, Latvia
14:00 (UTC+2:00)	Vestermans 6', 56'	Report	?	Stadium: ASK Riga; Attendance: 13,000; Referee: Matti Aalto (Finland)

4 September 1938 1938 Baltic Cup	Latvia	1–1	Lithuania	Tallinn, Estonia
17:30 (UTC+2:00)	Jaškevičius 28'	Report	Krupšs 87'	Stadium: Kadrioru Staadion; Attendance: 3,000; Referee: Fritz Bouillon (Germany)

5 September 1938 Baltic Cup	Estonia	1–1	Latvia	Tallinn, Estonia
17:30 UTC+2	Kass 12'	Report1; Report2	Raisters 49'	Stadium: Kadriorg Stadium; Attendance: 12,000; Referee: Fritz Bouillon (Germany)

25 September Friendly	Latvia	2–1	Poland	Rīga, Latvia
15:00	Vanags 26'; Šeibelis 83'	Report	Habowski 36'	Stadium: ASK Riga; Attendance: 14,000; Referee: Matti Aalto (Finland)

=== 1939 ===
18 May Friendly	Romania	4–0	Latvia	Bucharest, Romania
	Bodola 41', 83'; Dobay 56'; Laumanis 76' (o.g.)	Report		Stadium: Stadionul Venus; Attendance: 2,000; Referee: Maximilian Sznajder (Poland)

24 May Friendly	Bulgaria	3–0	Czechoslovakia	Sofia, Bulgaria
17:00 (UTC+2:00)	Bobev 6'; Angelov 18'; Pachedzhiev 43'	Report		Stadium: Junak Stadion; Attendance: 12,000; Referee: Mika Popović (Yugoslavia)

27 July Friendly	Latvia	3–3	Estonia	Riga, Latvia
18:15 UTC+2	Freimanis 25', 87'; Vanags 76'	Report1; Report2	Siimenson 17'; Kuremaa 55'; Veidemann 66'	Stadium: A.S.K. Stadions; Attendance: 12,000; Referee: Wilhelm Peters (Germany)

24 September Friendly	Finland	0–3	Latvia	Helsinki, Finland
14:00 (UTC+2)	Vanags 39', 49'; Kaņeps 60'	Report	Vestermans 25'	Stadium: Helsingin Olympiastadion; Attendance: 4,097; Referee: Otto Remke (Denmark)

=== 1940 ===
18 July Friendly	Estonia	2–1	Latvia	Tallinn, Estonia
19:00 UTC+2	Kuremaa 20', 84'	Report	Kaņeps 85'	Stadium: Kadriorg Stadium; Attendance: 7,000; Referee: Valerijonas Balčiūnas (Lithuania)
