= Estonia national football team results (1920–1940) =

This is a list of the Estonia national football team results from 1920 to 1940.

== 1920s ==
=== 1920 ===
17 October Friendly	Finland	6–0	Estonia	Helsinki, Finland
13:00 UTC+2	Öhman 5'; Eklöf 10', 80'; Österholm 15'; Tanner 35', 70'	Report1; Report2		Stadium: Töölön Pallokenttä; Attendance: 2,500; Referee: Kaarlo Soinio (Finland)

=== 1921 ===
23 July Friendly	Estonia	0–0	Sweden	Tallinn, Estonia
19:00 UTC+2		Report1; Report2		Stadium: Tiigiveski Spordiplats; Attendance: 3,500; Referee: Karlo Akel (Estonia)

28 August Friendly	Estonia	0–3	Finland	Tallinn, Estonia
18:00 UTC+2		Report1; Report2	Grannas 3'; Hirvonen 9'; Eklöf 78' (pen.)	Stadium: Tiigiveski Spordiplats; Attendance: 2,500; Referee: Bengt Sjöström (Finland)

=== 1922 ===
11 August Friendly	Finland	10–2	Estonia	Helsinki, Finland
18:30 UTC+2	Mantila 4', 85'; Öhman 10', 15' (pen.), 37', 46', 55', 59'; Eklöf 52', 58'; Mantila 85'	Report1; Report2	Kuulmann 40'; Tell 42'	Stadium: Töölön Pallokenttä; Attendance: 2,000; Referee: Gösta Löfgren (Finland)

24 September Friendly	Latvia	1–1	Estonia	Riga, Latvia
16:00 UTC+1:30	Barda 2'	Report1; Report2	Üpraus 88'	Stadium: LSB Stadions; Attendance: 3,000; Referee: Verner Eklöf (Finland)

=== 1923 ===
24 June Friendly	Lithuania	0–5	Estonia	Kaunas, Lithuania
16:30 UTC+2		Report1; Report2	Tell 1', 62', 79'; Eelma 40'; Paal 64'	Stadium: LFLS Kaunas; Attendance: 3,000; Referee: Adolf Hahne (Latvia)

24 July Friendly	Estonia	1–1	Latvia	Tallinn, Estonia
18:00 UTC+2	Paal 3'	Report1; Report2	Barda 65'	Stadium: Kalevi staadion Attendance: 4,000; Referee: Gunnar Sund (Sweden)

19 September Friendly	Estonia	2–4	Russia	Tallinn, Estonia
16:30 UTC+2	Kaljot 63' (pen.), 71' (pen.)	Report1; Report2	Butusov 28', 37', 84'; Isakov 50'	Stadium: Kalevi staadion Attendance: 4,000; Referee: Max Adler (Austria)

25 September Friendly	Estonia	1–4	Poland	Tallinn, Estonia
16:30 UTC+2	Joll 86'	Report1; Report2	Batsch 20'; Kowalski 38', 65'; Staliński 77'	Stadium: Kalevi staadion Attendance: 4,000; Referee: Verner Eklöf (Finland)

30 September Friendly	Estonia	2–1	Finland	Tallinn, Estonia
15:00 UTC+2	Tell 24'; Joll 84'	Report1; Report2	Österlund 67'	Stadium: Spordi Staadion; Attendance: 4,000; Referee: Julius Reinans (Estonia)

=== 1924 ===
25 May 1924 Summer Olympics First round	Estonia	0–1	United States	Paris, France
16:15 UTC+1		Report1; Report2	Straden 16' (pen.)	Stadium: Stade Pershing; Attendance: 8,110; Referee: Paul Putz (Belgium)

3 June Friendly	Estonia	1–3	Irish Free State	Colombes, France
15:00 UTC+1	Üpraus 37'	Report1; Report2	Duncan 15'; Robinson 48'; Ghent 69'	Stadium: Stade Olympique de Colombes; Attendance: 3,000; Referee: Yussuf Muhammad (Egypt)

19 June Friendly	Estonia	1–4	Turkey	Tallinn, Estonia
18:00 UTC+2	Üpraus 38'	Report1; Report2	Arca 30'; Gyrsoy 69'; Sporel 72', 75'	Stadium: Kalevi staadion Attendance: 5,500; Referee: Julius Reinans (Estonia)

25 July Friendly	Sweden	5–2	Estonia	Stockholm, Sweden
18:45 UTC+1	Haglund 22'; Keller 40'; Kock 63'; Kaufeldt 89'	Report1; Report2	Üpraus 2'; Väli 61'	Stadium: Stockholm Olympic Stadium; Attendance: 4,000; Referee: Gösta Löfgren (Finland)

24 August Friendly	Estonia	1–2	Lithuania	Tallinn, Estonia
18:00 UTC+2	Üpraus 58'	Report1; Report2	Krigas 21'; Seidleris 71'	Stadium: Kalevi staadion Attendance: 3,500; Referee: Juris Redlihs (Latvia)

14 September Friendly	Finland	4–0	Estonia	Helsinki, Finland
13:30 UTC+2	Kanerva 20'; Soinio 50'; Koponen 65', 85'	Report1; Report2		Stadium: Töölön Pallokenttä; Attendance: 4,000; Referee: Axel Bergqvist (Sweden)

18 October Friendly	Latvia	2–0	Estonia	Riga, Latvia
15:30 UTC+1:30	Abrams 28'; Barda 33'	Report1; Report2		Stadium: Riga ASK Stadions; Attendance: 5,000; Referee: David Grünbaum (Austria)

=== 1925 ===
28 June Friendly	Lithuania	0–1	Estonia	Kaunas, Lithuania
17:00 UTC+2		Report1; Report2	Üpraus 9'	Stadium: LFLS Stadionas; Attendance: 4,000; Referee: Juris Redlihs (Latvia)

5 July Friendly	Estonia	2–0	Finland	Tallinn, Estonia
19:00 UTC+2	Pihlak 20', 45' (pen.)	Report1; Report2		Stadium: Kalevi staadion Attendance: 3,000; Referee: Imre Józsa (Hungary)

26 August Friendly	Estonia	2–2	Latvia	Tallinn, Estonia
18:00 UTC+2	Pihlak 85' (pen.), 89' (pen.)	Report1; Report2	Taurinš 9', 19'	Stadium: Kalevi staadion Attendance: 4,000; Referee: Imre Józsa (Hungary)

2 September Friendly	Estonia	0–0	Poland	Tallinn, Estonia
5:00 UTC+2		Report1; Report2		Stadium: Kalevi staadion Attendance: 3,000; Referee: August Silber-Sillak (Estonia)

=== 1926 ===
13 June Friendly	Estonia	3–1	Lithuania	Tallinn, Estonia
19:00 UTC+2	Eelma 48'; Üpraus 63'; Pihlak 79'	Report1; Report2	S. Sabaliauskas 51'	Stadium: Kadriorg Stadium; Attendance: 5,000; Referee: Gustavs Kruminš (Latvia)

4 July Friendly	Poland	2–0	Estonia	Warsaw, Poland
15:30 UTC+1	Sobota 13'; Tupalski 68'	Report1; Report2		Stadium: Stadion Agrykola; Attendance: 4,000; Referee: Imre Vértes (Hungary)

23 July Friendly	Estonia	1–7	Sweden	Tallinn, Estonia
19:00 UTC+2	Räästas 81'	Report1; Report2	Kling 1', 17', 73'; Hedström 3', 31'; Lööf 33', 68'	Stadium: Kadriorg Stadium; Attendance: 5,000; Referee: Gustavs Kruminš (Latvia)

5 September Friendly	Finland	1–1	Estonia	Helsinki, Finland
12:30 UTC+2	Saario 70'	Report1; Report2	Koskinen 36' (o.g.)	Stadium: Töölön Pallokenttä; Attendance: 3,000; Referee: Elias Englund (Sweden)

19 September Friendly	Latvia	0–1	Estonia	Riga, Latvia
16:00 UTC+2		Report1; Report2	Eelma 70'	Stadium: ASK Stadions; Attendance: 5,000; Referee: Julius Zwicker (Austria)

=== 1927 ===
16 June Friendly	Estonia	4–1	Latvia	Tallinn, Estonia
19:00 UTC+2	Eelma 5'; Pihlak 20', 34' (pen.); Stanciks 69' (o.g.)	Report1; Report2	Urbans 17'	Stadium: Kadriorg Stadium; Attendance: 4,000; Referee: Gunnar Sund (Sweden)

1 July Friendly	Sweden	3–1	Estonia	Norrköping, Sweden
19:00 UTC+1	Keller 2', 69', 79'	Report1; Report2	Paal 69'	Stadium: Norrköpings Idrottspark; Attendance: 5,134; Referee: Sophus Hansen (Denmark)

10 August Friendly	Estonia	2–1	Finland	Tallinn, Estonia
18:30 UTC+2	Pihlak 11'; Joll 59'	Report1; Report2	Kulmala 52'	Stadium: Kadriorg Stadium; Attendance: 5,000; Referee: Axel Bergqvist (Sweden)

13 August Friendly	Lithuania	0–5	Estonia	Kaunas, Lithuania
17:00 UTC+2		Report1; Report2	Kipp 11'; Kull 54', 73'; Eelma 60'; Kaljot 62'	Stadium: LFLS Stadionas; Attendance: 3,000; Referee: GusWtavs Kruminš (Latvia)

25 September Friendly	Latvia	4–1	Estonia	Riga, Latvia
16:00 UTC+2	Žins 23'; Urbans 33'; Plade 51', 53'	Report1; Report2	Pihlak 62'	Stadium: LSB Stadions; Attendance: 3,500; Referee: Ernst Thomaschky (Germany)

=== 1928 ===
9 July Friendly	Estonia	0–1	Sweden	Tallinn, Estonia
19:00 UTC+2		Report1; Report2	Pettersson 81'	Stadium: Kadriorg Stadium; Attendance: 4,500; Referee: Matti Aalto (Finland)

26 July 1928 Baltic Cup	Estonia	6–0	Lithuania	Tallinn, Estonia
18:30 UTC+2	Pihlak 1', 21', 57'; Räästas 14'; Maurer 74', 78'	Report1; Report2		Stadium: Kadriorg Stadium; Attendance: 5,000; Referee: Gustaf Ekberg (Sweden)

27 July 1928 Baltic Cup	Estonia	0–1	Latvia	Tallinn, Estonia
18:30 UTC+2		Report1; Report2	Taurinš 63'	Stadium: Kadriorg Stadium; Attendance: 5,000; Referee: Gustaf Ekberg (Sweden)

12 August Friendly	Finland	2–2	Estonia	Helsinki, Finland
13:00 UTC+2	Åström 30'; Kanerva 63'	Report1; Report2	Paal 41', 74'	Stadium: Töölön Pallokenttä; Attendance: 3,000; Referee: Alf Hillerström (Sweden)

23 September Friendly	Latvia	1–1	Estonia	Riga, Latvia
16:00 UTC+2	Plade 26'	Report1; Report2	Pihlak 41'	Stadium: LSB Stadions; Attendance: 4,000; Referee: Valerijonas Balčiūnas (Lithuania)

=== 1929 ===
7 July Friendly	Sweden	4–1	Estonia	Landskrona, Sweden
18:00 UTC+1	Lundahl 14', 65'; Kroon 20'; Dahl 79' (pen.)	Report1; Report2	Joll 88'	Stadium: Landskrona IP; Attendance: 10,000; Referee: Otto Remke (Denmark)

25 July Friendly	Estonia	1–1	Finland	Tallinn, Estonia
19:00 UTC+2	Koponen 10'	Report1; Report2	Kull 17'	Stadium: Kadriorg Stadium; Attendance: 3,000; Referee: Gustaf Ekberg (Sweden)

15 August 1929 Baltic Cup	Estonia	5–2	Lithuania	Riga, Latvia
19:00 UTC+2	Einman 16', 59'; Eelma 75', 85'; Pihlak 32'	Report1; Report2	Chmelevskis 26'; Rutkauskas 35'	Stadium: LSB Stadions; Attendance: 2,000; Referee: Peco Bauwens (Germany)

16 August 1929 Baltic Cup	Latvia	2–2	Estonia	Riga, Latvia
18:00 UTC+2	Priede 27'; Pavlovs 63'	Report1; Report2	Einman 9'; Eelma 29'	Stadium: LSB Stadions; Attendance: 4,000; Referee: Peco Bauwens (Germany)

27 August Friendly	Finland	2–1	Estonia	Helsinki, Finland
17:45 UTC+1	Lönnberg 15' (pen.); Koponen 57'	Report1; Report2	Pihlak 49'	Stadium: Töölön Pallokenttä; Attendance: 3,000; Referee: Osborn Wenzel (Sweden)

18 September Friendly	Estonia	4–1	Latvia	Tallinn, Estonia
17:00 UTC+2	Brenner 10'; Eelma 33'; Paal 50'; Pihlak 75'	Report1; Report2	Šeibelis 82' (pen.)	Stadium: Kadriorg Stadium; Attendance: 4,000; Referee: Harry Kuhlberg (Finland)

== 1930s ==
=== 1930 ===
27 June Friendly	Estonia	1–1	Latvia	Tallinn, Estonia
19:00 UTC+2	Brenner 64'	Report1; Report2	Jenihs 30'	Stadium: Kadriorg Stadium; Attendance: 4,000; Referee: Harry Kuhlberg (Finland)

18 July Friendly	Estonia	1–5	Sweden	Tallinn, Estonia
19:00 UTC+2	Gerassimov-Kalvet 26'	Report1; Report2	Sundberg 7', 44', 73'; Thörn 38'; Johansson 41'	Stadium: Kadriorg Stadium; Attendance: 4,500; Referee: Yrjö Tuhkunen (Finland)

6 August Friendly	Estonia	4–0	Finland	Tallinn, Estonia
18:00 UTC+2	Karm 21', 86'; Brenner 42', 67'	Report1; Report2		Stadium: Kadriorg Stadium; Attendance: 3,000; Referee: Gustavs Kruminš (Latvia)

15 August 1930 Baltic Cup	Lithuania	2–1	Estonia	Kaunas, Lithuania
17:00 UTC+2	Citavičius 65'; Lingis 67'	Report1; Report2	Karm 49'	Stadium: Kariuomenes Stadium; Attendance: 4,000; Referee: Georg Muntau (Germany)

16 August 1930 Baltic Cup	Estonia	2–3	Latvia	Kaunas, Lithuania
17:00 UTC+2	Einman 18'; Karm 38'	Report1; Report2	Petersons 11'; Žins 15'; Dambrevics 56'	Stadium: Makabi Stadium; Attendance: 3,500; Referee: Georg Muntau (Germany)

13 September Friendly	Lithuania	4–0	Estonia	Klaipėda, Lithuania
16:30 UTC+2	Chmelevskis 27', 81'; Zekas 47'; Lingis 76'	Report1; Report2		Stadium: Miesto Stadium; Attendance: 3,000; Referee: Gustavs Kruminš (Latvia)

=== 1931 ===
28 May Friendly	Latvia	0–1	Estonia	Riga, Latvia
19:00 UTC+2		Report1; Report2	Einman 53'	Stadium: LSB Stadions; Attendance: 4,000; Referee: Józef Lustgarten (Poland)

9 June Friendly	Estonia	4–1	Lithuania	Tallinn, Estonia
19:00 UTC+2	Karm 19', 80', 82'; Kass 40'	Report1; Report2	Chmelevskis 70' (pen.)	Stadium: Kadriorg Stadium; Attendance: 4,000; Referee: Esko Pekkonen (Finland)

17 June Friendly	Finland	3–1	Estonia	Helsinki, Finland
19:00 UTC+2	Strömsten 2'; Åström 36', 44'	Report1; Report2	Räästas 53'	Stadium: Töölön Pallokenttä; Attendance: 3,851; Referee: Ivar Gustafsson (Sweden)

8 July Friendly	Sweden	3–1	Estonia	Gothenburg, Sweden
19:30 UTC+1	Jacobsson 27'; Zetterberg 29', 75'	Report1; Report2	Eelma 80'	Stadium: Idrottsplatsen; Attendance: 6,000; Referee: Esko Pekkonen (Finland)

30 August 1931 Baltic Cup	Estonia	2–0	Lithuania	Tallinn, Estonia
17:30 UTC+2	Eelma 13'; Kass 50'	Report1; Report2		Stadium: Kadriorg Stadium; Attendance: 5,500; Referee: Osborn Wenzel (Sweden)

1 September 1931 Baltic Cup	Estonia	3–1	Latvia	Tallinn, Estonia
17:30 UTC+2	Eelma 10'; Karm 51', 67'	Report1; Report2	Škincs 16'	Stadium: Kadriorg Stadium; Attendance: 6,500; Referee: Osborn Wenzel (Sweden)

27 September Friendly	Latvia	2–1	Estonia	Riga, Latvia
16:00 UTC+2	Škincs 67'; Štauvers 90' (pen.)	Report1; Report2	Kass 8'	Stadium: JKS Stadions; Attendance: 3,500; Referee: Józef Lustgarten (Poland)

=== 1932 ===
1 June Friendly	Estonia	3–0	Latvia	Tallinn, Estonia
19:00 UTC+2	Lassner 3'; Eelma 6'; Kass 89'	Report1; Report2		Stadium: Kadriorg Stadium; Attendance: 5,500; Referee: Esko Pekkonen (Finland)

5 June Friendly	Norway	3–0	Estonia	Oslo, Norway
19:00 UTC+1	Juve 12', 20'; Pedersen 45'	Report1; Report2		Stadium: Ullevaal Stadion; Attendance: 13,000; Referee: Yrjö Tuhkunen (Finland)

15 July Friendly	Estonia	1–3	Sweden	Tallinn, Estonia
19:00 UTC+2	Kass 77'	Report1; Report2	Johansson 25', 74'; Dunker 58'	Stadium: Kadriorg Stadium; Attendance: 6,000; Referee: Ragnar Wickström (Finland)

6 August Friendly	Lithuania	1–0	Estonia	Kaunas, Lithuania
17:30 UTC+2	Citavicius 36'	Report1; Report2		Stadium: LFLS Stadionas; Attendance: 1,000; Referee: Juris Redlihs (Latvia)

17 August Friendly	Estonia	0–3	Finland	Tallinn, Estonia
18:30 UTC+2		Report1; Report2	Salin 9'; Neuman-Tarimäe 25' (o.g.); Lintamo 37'	Stadium: Kadriorg Stadium; Attendance: 5,000; Referee: Alfreds Lazdinš (Latvia)

29 August 1932 Baltic Cup	Estonia	1–2	Lithuania	Riga, Latvia
18:00 UTC+2	Mõtlik 11'	Report1; Report2	Cižauskas 30'; Lingis 70'	Stadium: JKS Stadions; Attendance: 3,000; Referee: Sven Klang (Sweden)

30 August 1932 Baltic Cup	Latvia	1–0	Estonia	Riga, Latvia
18:00 UTC+2	Reinfeldt-Reinlo 58' (o.g.)	Report1; Report2		Stadium: JKS Stadions; Attendance: 5,000; Referee: Sven Klang (Sweden)

=== 1933 ===
28 May Friendly	Latvia	2–0	Estonia	Riga, Latvia
12:00 UTC+2	Tauriņš 45'; Pētersons 90'	Report1; Report2		Stadium: JKS Stadions; Attendance: 2,500; Referee: Valerijonas Balčiūnas (Lithuania)

11 June 1934 FIFA World Cup qualification Group 1	Sweden	6–2	Estonia	Stockholm, Sweden
14:00 UTC+1	Tipner 7'; Bunke 10', 43'; Ericsson 13', 70'; Andersson 79' (pen.)	Report1; Report2	Kass 47'; Kuremaa 61'	Stadium: Stockholm Olympic Stadium; Attendance: 8,123; Referee: Reidar Randers Johansen (Norway)

20 July Friendly	Estonia	2–1	Lithuania	Tallinn, Estonia
19:00 UTC+2	Idlane 68', 78'	Report1; Report2	Citavicius 30'	Stadium: Kadriorg Stadium; Attendance: 4,500; Referee: Yrjö Tuhkunen (Finland)

9 August Friendly	Estonia	2–1	Latvia	Tallinn, Estonia
19:00 UTC+2	Eelma 14'; Lassner 83'	Report1; Report2	Šeibelis 50'	Stadium: Kadriorg Stadium; Attendance: 6,000; Referee: Matti Aalto (Finland)

16 August Friendly	Finland	2–1	Estonia	Helsinki, Finland
18:15 UTC+2	Weckström 48'; Einman 65' (o.g.)	Report1; Report2	Ader 39'	Stadium: Töölön Pallokenttä; Attendance: 3,950; Referee: Ragnar Bäckström (Sweden)

2 September 1933 Baltic Cup	Lithuania	1–1	Estonia	Kaunas, Lithuania
16:30 UTC+2	Citavicius 55'	Report1; Report2	Kuremaa 15'	Stadium: Kariuomenės Stadionas; Attendance: 3,000; Referee: Yrjö Tuhkunen (Finland)

3 September 1933 Baltic Cup	Estonia	0–1	Latvia	Kaunas, Lithuania
16:30 UTC+2		Report1; Report2	Šeibelis 35'	Stadium: Kariuomenės Stadionas; Attendance: 3,000; Referee: Yrjö Tuhkunen (Finland)

5 September Friendly	Lithuania	0–5	Estonia	Kaunas, Lithuania
16:00 UTC+2		Report1; Report2	Eelma 6', 45', 49'; Siimenson 28'; Kuremaa 77'	Stadium: Kariuomenės Stadionas; Attendance: 1,200; Referee: Yrjö Tuhkunen (Finland)

=== 1934 ===
29 June Friendly	Lithuania	1–1	Estonia	Kaunas, Lithuania
18:00 UTC+2	Sabaliauskas 82' (pen.)	Report1; Report2	Parbo 33'	Stadium: Kariuomenės Stadionas; Attendance: 2,000; Referee: Juris Redlihs (Latvia)

8 August 1934 Turaani Turniir	Estonia	1–1	Finland	Tallinn, Estonia
18:30 UTC+2	Siimenson 60'	Report1; Report2	Taipale 20'	Stadium: Kadriorg Stadium; Attendance: 5,000; Referee: Ragnar Bäckström (Sweden)

10 August 1934 Turaani Turniir	Estonia	2–2	Hungary	Tallinn, Estonia
18:30 UTC+2	Kuremaa 37'; Neeris 71' (pen.)	Report1; Report2	Keszei 24', 47'	Stadium: Kadriorg Stadium; Attendance: 6,000; Referee: Ragnar Bäckström (Sweden)

=== 1935 ===
12 June Friendly	Latvia	1–1	Estonia	Riga, Latvia
18:30 UTC+2	Rozitis 65'	Report1; Report2	Siimenson 88'	Stadium: JKS Stadions; Attendance: 6,500; Referee: Sophus Hansen (Denmark)

19 June Friendly	Estonia	2–2	Lithuania	Tallinn, Estonia
19:00 UTC+2	Kuremaa 54'; Eelma 75'	Report1; Report2	Kersnauskas 39'; Bužinskas 70'	Stadium: Kadriorg Stadium; Attendance: 5,000; Referee: Einar Lundström (Finland)

9 July Friendly	Estonia	1–2	Sweden	Tallinn, Estonia
19:00 UTC+2	Eelma 62'	Report1; Report2	Samuelsson 15', 17'	Stadium: Kadriorg Stadium; Attendance: 7,000; Referee: Maati Aalto (Sweden)

7 August Friendly	Finland	2–2	Estonia	Helsinki, Finland
18:30 UTC+2	Larvo 38', 85'	Report1; Report2	Uukkivi 29'; Eelma 52'	Stadium: Töölön Pallokenttä; Attendance: 4,359; Referee: Otto Ohlsson (Sweden)

20 August 1935 Baltic Cup	Estonia	1–2	Lithuania	Tallinn, Estonia
18:00 UTC+2	Linberg 45'	Report1; Report2	Jaškevicius 32'; Lingis 75'	Stadium: Kadriorg Stadium; Attendance: 6,000; Referee: Rudolf Eklöw (Sweden)

22 August 1935 Baltic Cup	Estonia	1–1	Latvia	Tallinn, Estonia
18:00 UTC+2	Eelma 64'	Report1; Report2	Petersons 71'	Stadium: Kadriorg Stadium; Attendance: 7,000; Referee: Rudolf Eklöw (Sweden)

15 September Friendly	Germany	5–0	Estonia	Stettin, Poland
16:00 UTC+1	Malecki 3'; Simetsreiter 33', 65'; Rasselnberg 46'; Damminger 81'	Report1; Report2		Stadium: Stettiner SC Platz; Attendance: 17,000; Referee: Erik Malmström (Sweden)

18 September Friendly	Lithuania	2–2	Estonia	Kaunas, Lithuania
15:45 UTC+2	Lingis 38'; Kersnauskas 49'	Report1; Report2	Kuremaa 33', 48'	Stadium: Kariuomenės Stadium; Attendance: 3,000; Referee: Juris Redlihs (Latvia)

=== 1936 ===
28 May Friendly	Estonia	3–4	Latvia	Tallinn, Estonia
18:30 UTC+2	Linberg 34'; Siimenson 63'; Kuremaa 82'	Report1; Report2	Borduško 20'; Verners 31', 39'; Rozitis 73'	Stadium: Kadriorg Stadium; Attendance: 5,000; Referee: Saario Mauritz (Finland)

30 June Friendly	Lithuania	2–0	Estonia	Kaunas, Lithuania
17:45 UTC+2	Gudelis 58'; Selgitamisel 89'	Report1; Report2		Stadium: Valstybinis Stadium; Attendance: 5,000; Referee: Juris Redlihs (Latvia)

20 August Friendly	Estonia	2–2	Finland	Tallinn, Estonia
18:00 UTC+2	Uukkivi 63'; Kuremaa 69'	Report1; Report2	Grönlund 36'; Weckström 64'	Stadium: Kadriorg Stadium; Attendance: 4,500; Referee: Ragnar Bäckström (Sweden)

30 August 1936 Baltic Cup	Estonia	2–1	Lithuania	Riga, Latvia
17:00 UTC+2	Siimenson 24'; Kuremaa 61'	Report1; Report2	Gudelis 84'	Stadium: JKS Stadions; Attendance: 2,000; Referee: Rudolf Eklöw (Sweden)

31 August 1936 Baltic Cup	Latvia	2–1	Estonia	Riga, Latvia
17:30 UTC+2	Šeibelis 35'; Lidmanis 41' (pen.)	Report1; Report2	Kaljo 73' (pen.)	Stadium: JKS Stadions; Attendance: 10,000; Referee: Rudolf Eklöw (Sweden)

=== 1937 ===
3 June Friendly	Lithuania	1–2	Estonia	Kaunas, Lithuania
17:45 UTC+2	Gudelis 58'	Report1; Report2	Silberg-Sillak 62'; Uukkivi 89'	Stadium: Valstybinis Stadium; Attendance: 3,500; Referee: Alois Beranek (Austria)

20 June 1938 FIFA World Cup qualification Group 1	Sweden	7–2	Estonia	Solna, Sweden
19:00 UTC+1	Josefsson 8', 41'; Bunke 40'; Jonasson 50' (pen.); Wetterstrom 73', 80', 84'	Report1; Report2	Siimenson 2'; Uukkivi 3'	Stadium: Råsunda Stadium; Attendance: 18,171; Referee: Otto Remke (Denmark)

14 July Friendly	Estonia	2–1	Romania	Tallinn, Estonia
19:00 UTC+2	Kaljo 15'; Siimenson 80'	Report1; Report2	Bodola 54'	Stadium: Kadriorg Stadium; Attendance: 6,000; Referee: Augustin Krist (Czechoslovakia)

19 August 1938 FIFA World Cup qualification Group 1	Finland	0–1	Estonia	Turku, Finland
18:00 UTC+2		Report1; Report2	Kuremaa 56'	Stadium: Tapiolan urheilupuisto Attendance: 4,797; Referee: Ivan Eklind (Sweden)

29 August 1938 FIFA World Cup qualification Group 1	Germany	4–1	Estonia	Königsberg, Germany
16:00 UTC+1	Lehner 51', 65'; Gauchel 52', 86'	Report1; Report2	Siimenson 34'	Stadium: Horst Wessel Stadion; Attendance: 18,000; Referee: Bruno Pfützner (Czechoslovakia)

4 September 1937 Baltic Cup	Estonia	1–1	Latvia	Kaunas, Lithuania
16:00 UTC+2	Kuremaa 68'	Report1; Report2	Vestermans 35'	Stadium: Valstybinis Stadionas; Attendance: 8,000; Referee: Hans Frankenstein (Austria)

5 September 1937 Baltic Cup	Lithuania	0–4	Estonia	Kaunas, Lithuania
16:00 UTC+2		Report1; Report2	Siimenson 3', 50'; Uukkivi 22'; Sillandi 37'	Stadium: Valstybinis Stadionas; Attendance: 8,000; Referee: Hans Frankenstein (Austria)

7 September 1937 Baltic Cup	Estonia	0–2	Latvia	Kaunas, Lithuania
17:00 UTC+2		Report1; Report2	Rozītis 12'; Vestermans 19'	Stadium: Valstybinis Stadionas; Attendance: 8,000; Referee: Hans Frankenstein (Austria)

19 September Friendly	Latvia	3–1	Estonia	Riga, Latvia
16:00 UTC+2	Rozītis 23'; Kaņeps 28'; Borduško 66'	Report1; Report2	Kuremaa 32'	Stadium: Riia ASK Staddion; Attendance: 12,000; Referee: Alois Beranek (Austria)

=== 1938 ===
31 May Friendly	Norway	1–0	Estonia	Oslo, Norway
19:15 UTC+1	Brustad 65'	Report1; Report2		Stadium: Ullevaal Stadion; Attendance: 19,200; Referee: Einar Lundström (Finland)

11 June Friendly	Lithuania	0–2	Estonia	Kaunas, Lithuania
18:00 UTC+2		Report1; Report2	Kuremaa 19', 38'	Stadium: Valstybinis Stadionas; Attendance: 5,000; Referee: Arvīds Jurgens (Latvia)

22 June Friendly	Estonia	2–3	Hungary	Tallinn, Estonia
19:30 UTC+2	Siimenson 27'; Kuremaa 56'	Report1; Report2	Soproni 14', 65'; Gyula 83'	Stadium: Kadriorg Stadium; Attendance: 7,000; Referee: Esko Pekkonen (Finland)

20 July Friendly	Estonia	0–2	Latvia	Tallinn, Estonia
19:00 UTC+2		Report1; Report2	Raisters 19'; Vanags 86'	Stadium: Kadriorg Stadium; Attendance: 9,500; Referee: Fritz Bouillon (Germany)

17 August Friendly	Estonia	1–3	Finland	Tallinn, Estonia
18:30 UTC+2	Siimenson 39'	Report1; Report2	Weckström 27'; Eronen 85'; Lehtonen 87'	Stadium: Kadriorg Stadium; Attendance: 6,000; Referee: Karl Brust (Germany)

3 September 1938 Baltic Cup	Estonia	3–1	Lithuania	Tallinn, Estonia
17:30 UTC+2	Veidemann 40', 44'; Uukkivi 69'	Report1; Report2	Šurkus 72'	Stadium: Kadriorg Stadium; Attendance: 7,000; Referee: Fritz Bouillon (Germany)

5 September 1938 Baltic Cup	Estonia	1–1	Latvia	Tallinn, Estonia
17:30 UTC+2	Kass 12'	Report1; Report2	Raisters 49'	Stadium: Kadriorg Stadium; Attendance: 12,000; Referee: Fritz Bouillon (Germany)

=== 1939 ===
29 June Friendly	Estonia	0–2	Germany	Tallinn, Estonia
19:00 UTC+2		Report1; Report2	Lehner 34'; Schaletzki 60'	Stadium: Kadriorg Stadium; Attendance: 9,000; Referee: Arvīds Jurgens (Latvia)

27 July Friendly	Latvia	3–3	Estonia	Riga, Latvia
18:15 UTC+2	Freimanis 25', 87'; Vanags 76'	Report1; Report2	Siimenson 17'; Kuremaa 55'; Veidemann 66'	Stadium: A.S.K. Stadions; Attendance: 12,000; Referee: Wilhelm Peters (Germany)

4 August Friendly	Finland	4–2	Estonia	Helsinki, Finland
19:00 UTC+2	Kylmälä 48', 66', 78'; Eronen 88'	Report1; Report2	Uukkivi 9'; Kass 52'	Stadium: Helsinki Olympic Stadium; Attendance: 6,154; Referee: Arvīds Jurgens (Latvia)

27 August Friendly	Estonia	0–1	Lithuania	Tallinn, Estonia
17:30 UTC+2		Report1; Report2	Adomavicius 60'	Stadium: Kadriorg Stadium; Attendance: 5,500; Referee: Einar Lundström (Finland)

== 1940s ==
=== 1940 ===
18 July Friendly	Estonia	2–1	Latvia	Tallinn, Estonia
19:00 UTC+2	Kuremaa 20', 84'	Report1; Report2	Kaneps 85'	Stadium: Kadriorg Stadium; Attendance: 8,000; Referee: Valerijonas Balčiūnas (Lithuania)
