= Lithuania national football team results (1922–1939) =

Lithuania national football team

- Win Draw Loss

The Lithuania national football team represents Lithuania in association football and is controlled by the Lithuanian Football Federation (LFF), the governing body of the sport in the country.

The team's largest victory came between 1922 and 1939 when they defeated Estonia 4–0 on 13 September 1930. Their worst loss between 1922 and 1939 was actually there heaviest defeat on Lithuania. It was a 10–0 defeat from Egypt on 27 May 1924.

== Results ==
=== 1922 ===
No matches played

=== 1923 ===
24 June 1923 Friendly	Lithuania	0-5	Estonia	Kaunas, Lithuania
16:30 (UTC+2:00)		Report	Tell 1', 62', 79'; Eelma 40'; Paal 64'	Stadium: Lietuvos Fizinio Lavinimosi Sąjunga Stadionas; Attendance: 3,000; Referee: Haralds Hāne (Latvia)
Note: This was the first official match for Lithuania

=== 1924 ===
25 May 1924 Olympics First Round	Lithuania	0-9	Switzerland	Paris, France
14:30 (UTC+1:00)		Report	Sturzenegger 2', 43', 68', 85'; Abegglen 41', 50', 58'; Dietrich 14'; Ramseyer 63' (pen.)	Stadium: Stade Général John Joseph Pershing; Attendance: 8,110; Referee: Antonio Scamoni (Italy)

27 May 1924 Friendly	Lithuania	0-10	Egypt	Paris, France
		Report		Stadium: Stade Général John Joseph Pershing; Attendance: 1,000; Referee: August Silber (Estonia)
Note: No sources show what time the game was or who scored. This was the heaviest defeat for Lithuania

16 August 1924 Friendly	Lithuania	2-4	Latvia	Kaunas, Lithuania
16:30 (UTC+2:00)	Nopensas 17', 88'	Report	Stančiks 2'; A. Bārda 22'; Ābrams 34'; Plade 40' (pen.)	Stadium: Lietuvos Fizinio Lavinimosi Sąjunga Stadionas; Attendance: 5,000; Referee: August Silber (Estonia)
Note: First match when Lithuania scored. Vilhelmas Nopensas set the goal scoring record for Lithuania (2 goals)

24 August 1924 Friendly	Estonia	1-2	Lithuania	Tallinn, Estonia
18:00 (UTC+2:00)	Üpraus 58'	Report	Krigas 21'; Seidleris 71'	Stadium: Kalevi Staadion; Attendance: 3,500; Referee: Juris Rēdlihs (Latvia)

=== 1925 ===
28 June 1925 Friendly	Lithuania	0-1	Estonia	Kaunas, Lithuania
17:00 (UTC+2:00)		Report	Üpraus 9'	Stadium: Lietuvos Fizinio Lavinimosi Sąjunga Stadionas; Attendance: 4,000; Referee: Juris Rēdlihs (Latvia)

20 September 1925 Friendly	Latvia	2-2	Lithuania	Riga, Latvia
15:30 (UTC+1:37)	E. Bārda 23', 85'	Report	S. Sabaliauskas 15'; Žukauskas 55'	Stadium: Armijas Sporta Klub Stadions; Attendance: 2,500; Referee: August Silber (Estonia)

=== 1926 ===
13 June 1926 Friendly	Estonia	3-1	Lithuania	Tallinn, Estonia
19:00 (UTC+2:00)	Eelma 48'; Üpraus 63'; Pihlak 79'	Report	S. Sabaliauskas 51'	Stadium: Kadrioru Staadion; Attendance: 5,000; Referee: Gotfrīds Krūmiņš (Latvia)

21 August 1926 Friendly	Lithuania	2-3	Latvia	Kaunas, Lithuania
17:00 (UTC+2:00)	S. Sabaliauskas 22' (pen.); Žebrauskas 49'	Report	Pavlovs 27', 86'; Stančiks 56'	Stadium: Makabi Stadionas; Attendance: 2,500; Referee: Otto Silber (Estonia)
Note: Stasys Sabaliauskas set the goal scoring record for Lithuania (3 goals)

=== 1927 ===
27 July 1927 Friendly	Latvia	6-3	Lithuania	Riga, Latvia
18:30 (UTC+2:00)	Žins 17', 58', 89'; Plade 8', 57'; Bradiņš 39'	Report	Marcinkus 40'; Blatas 63'; Trumpjonas 72'	Stadium: A.S.K. Stadions; Attendance: 3,500; Referee: Karel Kettner (Czechoslovakia)

13 August 1927 Friendly	Lithuania	0-5	Estonia	Kaunas, Lithuania
17:00 (UTC+2:00)		Report	Kull 54', 73'; Kipp 11'; Eelma 60'; Kaljot 62'	Stadium: Lietuvos Fizinio Lavinimosi Sąjunga Stadionas; Attendance: 3,000; Referee: Gotfrīds Krūmiņš (Latvia)

=== 1928 ===
25 July 1928 1928 Baltic Cup	Lithuania	0-3	Latvia	Tallinn, Estonia
18:30 (UTC+2:00)		Report	Vaters 25', 66'; Pavlovs 2'	Stadium: Kadrioru Staadion; Attendance: 2,000; Referee: Gustaf Ekberg (Sweden)

26 July 1928 1928 Baltic Cup	Estonia	6-0	Lithuania	Tallinn, Estonia
18:30 (UTC+2:00)	Pihlak 1' (pen.), 21', 57'; Maurer 74', 78'; Räästas 14'	Report		Stadium: Kadrioru Staadion; Attendance: 3,000; Referee: Gustaf Ekberg (Sweden)

1 September 1928 Friendly	Lithuania	1-1	Latvia	Kaunas, Lithuania
16:00 (UTC+2:00)	Škėma 55'	Report	Urbāns 78'	Stadium: Makabi Stadionas; Attendance: 2,500; Referee: Georg Muntau (Germany)

=== 1929 ===
14 August 1929 1929 Baltic Cup	Latvia	3-1	Lithuania	Riga, Latvia
18:00(UTC+2:00)	Plade 51', 68', 86'	Report	Chmelevskis 89' (pen.)	Stadium: L.S.B. Stadions; Attendance: 2,000; Referee: Peco Bauwens (Germany)

15 August 1929 1929 Baltic Cup	Estonia	5-2	Lithuania	Riga, Latvia
19:00 (UTC+2:00)	Einmann 16', 59'; Eelma 75', 85'; Pihlak 32'	Report	Chmelevskis 26'; Rutkauskas 35'	Stadium: L.S.B. Stadions; Attendance: 2,000; Referee: Peco Bauwens (Germany)

=== 1930 ===
15 August 1930 1930 Baltic Cup	Lithuania	2-1	Estonia	Kaunas, Lithuania
17:00 (UTC+2:00)	Citavičius 65'; Lingus 67'	Report	Karm 49'	Stadium: Kariuomenės Stadionas; Attendance: 2,600; Referee: Georg Muntau (Germany)

17 August 1930 1930 Baltic Cup	Lithuania	3-3	Latvia	Kaunas, Lithuania
16:30 (UTC+2:00)	Citavičius 32'; Lingis 46'; Chmelevskis 89'	Report	Pētersons 37', 61', 64'	Stadium: Kariuomenės Stadionas; Attendance: 5,000; Referee: Georg Muntau (Germany)

13 September 1930 Friendly	Lithuania	4-0	Estonia	(Klaipėda), Lithuania
16:30 (UTC+2:00)	Chmelevskis 27', 81'; Zekas 47' Lingis 81'	Report		Stadium: Miesto Stadionas; Attendance: 3,000; Referee: Gotfrīds Krūmiņš (Latvia)
Note: Stepas Chmelevskis set the goal scoring record for Lithuania (5 goals)

=== 1931 ===
9 June 1931 Friendly	Estonia	4-1	Lithuania	Tallinn, Estonia
19:00 (UTC+2:00)	Karm 19', 80', 82'; Kass 40'	Report	Chmelevskis 70'	Stadium: Kadrioru Staadion; Attendance: 4,000; Referee: Esko Pekonen (Finland)
Note: Stepas Chmelevskis set the goal scoring record for Lithuania (6 goals)

30 June 1931 Friendly	Latvia	5-2	Lithuania	Riga, Latvia
18:30 (UTC+2:00)	Pētersons 16', 33', 56', 59'; Verners 87'	Report	Citavičius 39'; Dirgėla 41'	Stadium: L.S.B. Stadions; Attendance: 3,500; Referee: Heinrich Paal (Estonia)

26 August 1931 Friendly	Lithuania	2-4	Romania	Kaunas, Lithuania
17:00 (UTC+2:00)	Raclauskas 34'; Trumpjonas 37'	Report	Bodola 3', 28', 81'; Sepi 58'	Stadium: Lietuvos Fizinio Lavinimosi Sąjunga Stadionas; Attendance: 1,000; Referee: Juris Rēdlihs

30 August 1931 1931 Baltic Cup	Estonia	2-0	Lithuania	Tallinn, Estonia
17:30 (UTC+2:00)	Eelma 13'; Kass 50'	Report		Stadium: Kadrioru Staadion; Attendance: 4,200; Referee: Osborn Wenzel (Sweden)

31 August 1931 1931 Baltic Cup	Latvia	1-0	Lithuania	Tallinn, Estonia
17:30 (UTC+2:00)	Pētersons 11'	Report		Stadium: Kadrioru Staadion; Attendance: 2,000; Referee: Osborn Wenzel (Sweden)

=== 1932 ===
29 June 1932 Friendly	Lithuania	2-3	Latvia	Kaunas, Lithuania
17:40 (UTC+2:00)	Lingis 74' (pen.); Citavičius 88'	Report	Jēnihs 11', 86'; Šeibelis 9'	Stadium: Lietuvos Fizinio Lavinimosi Sąjunga Stadionas; Attendance: 2,000; Referee: Heinrich Paal (Estonia)

24 July 1932 Friendly	Latvia	2-1	Lithuania	Liepāja, Latvia
18:00 (UTC+2:00)	Pētersons 42'; Tauriņš 80'	Report	Lingis 85'	Stadium: Stadions Olimpija; Attendance: 15,000; Referee: Voldemar Rõks (Estonia)

6 August 1932 Friendly	Lithuania	1-0	Estonia	Kaunas, Lithuania
17:30 (UTC+2:00)	Citavičius 36'	Report		Stadium: Lietuvos Fizinio Lavinimosi Sąjunga Stadionas; Attendance: 1,000; Referee: Juris Rēdlihs (Latvia)

28 August 1932 1932 Baltic Cup	Latvia	4-1	Lithuania	Riga, Latvia
17:30 (UTC+2:00)	Pētersons 52'; Šeibelis 53'; Jēnihs 65'; Tauriņš 73'	Report	Citavičius 15'	Stadium: J.K.S. Stadions; Attendance: 4,000; Referee: Sven Klang (Sweden)

29 August 1932 1932 Baltic Cup	Estonia	1-2	Lithuania	Riga, Latvia
18:00 (UTC+2:00)	Mõtlik 11'	Report	Čižauskas 30'; Lingis 70'	Stadium: J.K.S. Stadions; Attendance: 3,000; Referee: Sven Klang (Sweden)

11 September 1932 Friendly	Lithuania	1-0	Latvia	Kaunas, Lithuania
	Lingis 30'	Report		Stadium: Lietuvos Fizinio Lavinimosi Sąjunga Stadionas; Attendance: 2,000; Referee: Otto Silber (Estonia)
Note: Antanas Lingis set the goal scoring record for Lithuania (7 goals)

25 September 1932 Friendly	Sweden	8-1	Lithuania	Solna, Sweden
14:00 (UTC+1:00)	Nilsson 59', 60', 65', 75'; Gustavsson 11', 78'; Johansson 42', 54'	Report	Efišovas 52'	Stadium: Stockholms Olympiastadion; Attendance: 15,000; Referee: Yrjö Tuhkunen (Finland)

=== 1933 ===
12 June 1933 Friendly	Latvia	6-2	Lithuania	Riga, Latvia
18:30 (UTC+2:00)	Pētersons 9', 74', 74'; Brēde 24'; Šeibelis 34'; Tauriņš 86'	Report	Z. Sabaliauskas 30'; Dirgėla 58'	Stadium: J.K.S. Stadions; Attendance: 3,000; Referee: Heinrich Paal (Estonia)

29 June 1933 1934 WCQ Group 1	Lithuania	0-2	Sweden	Kaunas, Lithuania
18:00 (UTC+2:00)		Report	Hansson 55', 65'	Stadium: Kariuomenės Stadionas; Attendance: 6,000; Referee: August Silber (Estonia)

20 July 1933 Friendly	Estonia	2-1	Lithuania	Tallinn, Estonia
19:00 (UTC+2:00)	Idlane 68', 78'	Report	Citavičius 30'	Stadium: Kadrioru Staadion; Attendance: 4,500; Referee: Yrjö Tuhkunen (Finland)

9 August 1933 Friendly	Finland	9-2	Lithuania	Helsinki, Finland
18:30 (UTC+2:00)	Åström 2', 70'; Grönlund 19', 62'; Ronkanen 32', 56'; Karjagin 41', 83'; Viinioksa 7'	Report	Z. Sabaliauskas 4', 87'	Stadium: Töölön Pallokenttä; Attendance: 3,196; Referee: Voldemar Rõks (Estonia)

2 September 1933 1933 Baltic Cup	Lithuania	1-1 (a.e.t.)	Estonia	Kaunas, Lithuania
16:30 (UTC+2:00)	Citavičius 55'	Report	Kuremaa 15'	Stadium: Kariuomenės Stadionas; Attendance: 3,000; Referee: Yyrö Tuhkunen (Finland)
Note: Match abandoned at 1-1 due to darkness after first 15 minutes of extra time (105th min); Jaroslavas Citavičius set the goal scoring record for Lithuania (8 goals)

4 September 1933 1933 Baltic Cup	Lithuania	2-2	Latvia	Kaunas, Lithuania
16:00 (UTC+2:00)	Z. Sabaliauskas 33'; Lingis 55'	Report	Pētersons 52', 65'	Stadium: Kariuomenės Stadionas; Attendance: 3,000; Referee: Yrjö Tuhkunen (Finland)

5 September 1933 1933 Baltic Cup Replay	Lithuania	0-5	Estonia	Kaunas, Lithuania
16:00 (UTC+2:00)		Report	Eelma 6', 45', 49'; Siimenson 28'; Kuremaa 77'	Stadium: Kariuomenės Stadionas; Attendance: 1,000; Referee: Yrjö Tuhkunen (Finland)

=== 1934 ===
10 June 1934 Friendly	Lithuania	2-0	Latvia	Kaunas, Lithuania
18:00 (UTC+2:00)	Baliulevičius 11', 78'	Report		Stadium: Kariuomenės Stadionas; Attendance: 3,000; Referee: Voldemar Loodla (Estonia)

29 June 1934 Friendly	Lithuania	1-1	Estonia	Kaunas, Lithuania
18:00 (UTC+2:00)	Z. Sabaliauskas 87' (pen.)	Report	Parbo 33'	Stadium: Kariuomenės Stadionas; Attendance: 2,000; Referee: Juris Rēdlihs (Latvia)

16 August 1934 Friendly	Lithuania	1-0	Finland	Kaunas, Lithuania
17:00 (UTC+2:00)	Kersnauskas 57'	Report		Stadium: Kariuomenės Stadionas; Attendance: 5,000; Referee: Juris Rēdlihs (Latvia)

9 September 1934 Friendly	Latvia	1-3	Lithuania	Riga, Latvia
16:30 (UTC+2:00)	Borduško 37'	Report	Pavlovs 28' (o.g.); Klimas 41'; Bubnovas 75'	Stadium: J.K.S. Stadions; Attendance: 5,000; Referee: Yrjö Tuhkunen (Finland)

=== 1935 ===
30 May 1935 Friendly	Latvia	6-1	Lithuania	Riga, Latvia
17:00 (UTC+2:00)	Vītols 30', 63', 77'; Vestermans 75', 79'; Raisters 5'	Report	Bužinskas 80'	Stadium: J.K.S. Stadions; Attendance: 5,000; Referee: Sophus Hansen (Denmark)

19 June 1935 Friendly	Estonia	2-2	Lithuania	Tallinn, Estonia
19:00 (UTC+2:00)	Kuremaa 54'; Eelma 75'	Report	Kersnauskas 39'; Bužinskas 70'	Stadium: Kadrioru Staadion; Attendance: 5,000; Referee: Einar Lundström (Finland)

20 August 1935 1935 Baltic Cup	Estonia	1-2	Lithuania	Tallinn, Estonia
18:00 (UTC+2:00)	Linberg 45'	Report	Jaškevičius 32'; Lingis 75'	Stadium: Kadrioru Staadion; Attendance: 6,000; Referee: Rudolf Eklöw (Sweden)
Note: Antanas Lingis set the goal scoring record for Lithuania (9 goals)

21 August 1935 1935 Baltic Cup	Latvia	2-2	Lithuania	Tallinn, Estonia
18:00 (UTC+2:00)	Vestermans 17', 75'	Report	Lingis 33'; Gudelis 48'	Stadium: Kadrioru Staadion; Attendance: 3,500; Referee: Rudolf Eklöw (Sweden)
Note: Antanas Lingis set the goal scoring record for Lithuania (10 goals)

8 September 1935 Friendly	Lithuania	2-2	Latvia	Kaunas, Lithuania
16:15 (UTC+2:00)	Lingis 28'; Marcinkus 54'	Report	Lidmanis 12' (pen.); Pētersons 63'	Stadium: Kariuomenės Stadionas; Attendance: 5,000; Referee: Sophus Hansen (Denmark)
Note: Antanas Lingis set the goal scoring record for Lithuania (11 goals)

18 September 1935 Friendly	Lithuania	2-2	Estonia	Kaunas, Lithuania
15:45 (UTC+2:00)	Lingis 38'; Kersnauskas 49'	Report	Kuremaa 33', 48'	Stadium: Kariuomenės Stadionas; Attendance: 3,000; Referee: Juris Rēdlihs (Latvia)
Note: Antanas Lingis set the goal scoring record for Lithuania (12 goals)

=== 1936 ===
14 June 1936 Friendly	Lithuania	1-5	Latvia	Kaunas, Lithuania
18:00 (UTC+2:00)	Kersnauskas 45'	Report	Šeibelis 24', 76'; Verners 3'; Raisters 48'; Pakalns 53'	Stadium: Kariuomenės Stadionas; Attendance: 3,500; Referee: Rudolf Eklöw (Sweden)

30 June 1936 Friendly	Lithuania	2-0	Estonia	Kaunas, Lithuania
17:45 (UTC+2:00)	Gudelis 58'; Z. Sabaliauskas 89'	Report		Stadium: Valstybinis Stadionas; Attendance: 5,000; Referee: Juris Rēdlihs

29 August 1936 1936 Baltic Cup	Latvia	2-1	Lithuania	Riga, Latvia
16:30 (UTC+2:00)	Vestermans 75'; Šeibelis 90'	Report	Jaškevičius 27'	Stadium: J.K.S. Stadions; Attendance: 6,000; Referee: Rudolf Eklöw (Sweden)

30 August 1936 1936 Baltic Cup	Estonia	2-1	Lithuania	Riga, Latvia
17:00 (UTC+2:00)	Siimenson 24'; Kuremaa 61'	Report	Gudelis 84'	Stadium: J.K.S. Stadions; Attendance: 3,500; Referee: Juris Rēdlihs (Latvia)

=== 1937 ===
3 June 1937 Friendly	Lithuania	1-2	Estonia	Kaunas, Lithuania
17:45 (UTC+2:00)	Gudelis 58'	Report	Sillak 62'; Uukkivi 89'	Stadium: Valstybinis Stadionas; Attendance: 3,500; Referee: Alois Beranek (Austria)

8 July 1937 Friendly	Lithuania	0-2	Romania	Kaunas, Lithuania
18:15 (UTC+2:00)		Report	Bogdan 17'; Bodola 88'	Stadium: Valstybinis Stadionas; Attendance: 5,000; Referee: Voldemar Rõks (Estonia)

29 July 1937 1938 WCQ; Group 8 First Round	Latvia	4-2	Lithuania	Riga, Latvia
18:00 (UTC+2:00)	Kaņeps 19', 52'; Vestermans 50'; Borduško 83'	Report	Gudelis 79'; Paulionis 90'	Stadium: A.S.K. Stadions; Attendance: 10,000; Referee: Gustav Krist Czechoslovkia

3 September 1937 1938 WCQ; Group 8 First Round & 1937 Baltic Cup	Lithuania	1-5	Latvia	Kaunas, Lithuania
16:00 (UTC+2:00)	Paulionis 72'	Report	Kaņeps 4', 45' (pen.); Borduško 11', 30'; Vestermans 67'	Stadium: Valstybinis Stadionas; Attendance: 8,000; Referee: Hans Frankenstein (Austria)

5 September 1937 1937 Baltic Cup	Lithuania	0-4	Estonia	Kaunas, Lithuania
16:00 (UTC+2:00)		Report	Siimenson 3', 50'; Uukkivi 22'; Sillandi 37'	Stadium: Valstybinis Stadionas; Attendance: 8,000; Referee: Hans Frankenstein (Austria)

=== 1938 ===
17 May 1938 Friendly	Lithuania	0-2	Latvia	Kaunas, Lithuania
19:00 (UTC+2:00)		Report	Vanags 73', 88'	Stadium: A.S.K. Stadions; Attendance: 12,000; Referee: Alois Beranek (Austria)

11 June 1938 Friendly	Lithuania	0-2	Estonia	Kaunas, Lithuania
18:00 (UTC+2:00)		Report	Kuremaa 19', 38'	Stadium: Valstybinis Stadionas; Attendance: 5,000; Referee: Arvīds Jurgens (Latvia)

3 September 1938 1938 Baltic Cup	Estonia	3-1	Lithuania	Tallinn, Estonia
17:30 (UTC+2:00)	Veidemann 40', 44'; Uukkivi 69'	Report	Šurkus 72'	Stadium: Kadrioru Staadion; Attendance: 7,000; Referee: Fritz Bouillon (Germany)

4 September 1938 1938 Baltic Cup	Latvia	1-1	Lithuania	Tallinn, Estonia
17:30 (UTC+2:00)	Jaškevičius 28'	Report	Krupšs 87'	Stadium: Kadrioru Staadion; Attendance: 3,000; Referee: Fritz Bouillon (Germany)

18 September 1938 Friendly	Finland	3-1	Lithuania	Helsinki, Finland
14:00 (UTC+2:00)	Lehtonen 30', 56', 75'	Report	Jaškevičius 16'	Stadium: Helsingin Olympiastadion; Attendance: 6,547; Referee: Eduard Eelma (Estonia)

=== 1939 ===
11 June 1939 Friendly	Sweden	7-0	Lithuania	Karlstad, Sweden
18:00 (UTC+1:00)	Larsson 1', 87'; Hjelm 9', 12'; Nyström 31'; Lundin 59' (pen.); Karlsson 72'	Report		Stadium: Tingvalla Idrottsplats; Attendance: 5,602; Referee: Kolbjørn Dæhlen (Norway)

27 August 1939 Friendly	Estonia	0-1	Lithuania	Tallinn, Estonia
17:30 (UTC+2:00)		Report	Adomavičius 60'	Stadium: Kadrioru Staadion; Attendance: 5,500; Referee: Einar Lundström (Finland)

== Record by opponent ==
Team	Pld	W	D	L	GF	GA	GD	WPCT
Egypt	1	0	0	1	0	10	−10	0.00
Estonia	27	8	4	15	30	61	−31	29.63
Finland	3	1	0	2	4	12	−8	33.33
Latvia	27	3	7	17	41	78	−37	11.11
Romania	2	0	0	2	2	6	−4	0.00
Sweden	3	0	0	3	1	17	−16	0.00
Switzerland	1	0	0	1	0	9	−9	0.00
Total	64	12	11	41	78	193	−115	18.75

Source: Results
