= 1937 Baltic Cup =

International football competition

Tournament details
- Host country: Lithuania
- Dates: September 1 – 7
- Venue: 1 (in 1 host city)

Final positions
- Champions: Latvia (4th title)
- Runners-up: Estonia
- Third place: Lithuania

Tournament statistics
- Matches played: 4
- Goals scored: 14 (3.5 per match)
- Top scorer: (Latvia) Iļja Vestermans

The 1937 Baltic Cup was the ninth playing of the Baltic Cup football tournament. It was held from September 3–7, 1937 in Kaunas, Lithuania.

As Latvia and Estonia finished with equal points and equal goal difference, a replay was organised for the first time which Latvia won 2–0.

== Standings ==
Team	Pld	W	D	L	GF	GA	GD	Pts
Latvia	2	1	1	0	6	2	+4	3
Estonia	2	1	1	0	5	1	+4	3
Lithuania	2	0	0	2	1	9	–8	0

== Results ==
3 September 1937
16:00 (UTC+2:00)

Latvia	5 – 1	Lithuania
Kaņeps 4', 45' (pen.); Borduško 11', 30'; Vestermans 67'	Report	Paulionis 72'

Valstybinis Stadionas, Kaunas
Attendance: 8,000
Referee: Hans Frankenstein (Austria)

This match was also valid for the 1938 FIFA World Cup qualification.

4 September 1937
16:00 (UTC+2:00)

Latvia	1 – 1	Estonia
Vestermans 35'	Report	Kuremaa 68'

Valstybinis Stadionas, Kaunas
Attendance: 8,000
Referee: Hans Frankenstein (Austria)
5 September 1937
16:00 (UTC+2:00)

Estonia	4 – 0	Lithuania
Siimenson 3', 50'; Uukkivi 22'; Sillandi 37'	Report

Valstybinis Stadionas, Kaunas
Attendance: 8,000
Referee: Hans Frankenstein (Austria)

== Replay ==
7 September 1937
17:00 (UTC+2:00)

Latvia	2 – 0	Estonia
Rozītis 12'; Vestermans 19'	Report

Valstybinis Stadionas, Kaunas
Attendance: 6,000
Referee: Hans Frankenstein (Austria)

1937 Baltic Cup winner

Latvia
Fourth title

== Statistics ==
=== Goalscorers ===
There were 14 goals scored in 4 matches, for an average of 3.5 goals per match.

3 goals

- (Latvia) Iļja Vestermans

2 goals

- (Estonia) Georg Siimenson
- (Latvia) Fricis Kaņeps
- (Latvia) Vaclavs Borduško

1 goal

- (Estonia) Heinrich Uukkivi
- (Estonia) Aavo Sillandi
- (Estonia) Richard Kuremaa
- (Latvia) Jānis Rozītis
- (Lithuania) Jonas Paulionis
