= 1938 FIFA World Cup qualification =

Qualification rounds for the 1938 FIFA World Cup

1938 FIFA World Cup Qualification
Tournament details
- Dates: 16 June 1937 – 1 May 1938
- Teams: 37 (from 3 confederations)

Tournament statistics
- Matches played: 22
- Goals scored: 96 (4.36 per match)
- Top scorer(s): (Latvia) Fricis Kaņeps (Hungary) Gyula Zsengellér (5 goals each)

A total of 37 teams (including the late application of Argentina) entered the 1938 FIFA World Cup qualification rounds, competing for a total of 16 spots in the final tournament. For the first time the title holders and the host country were given automatic qualification. Therefore, France, as the hosts, and Italy, as the defending champions, qualified automatically, leaving 14 spots open for competition.

Due to the Spanish Civil War, Spain's application was initially suspended and eventually rejected. The remaining teams were divided into groups based on geographical considerations, as follows:

- Europe and the Near East: 11 places, contested by 23 teams (including Egypt and Mandatory Palestine) divided into eight groups.
- The Americas: 2 places, contested by 9 teams.
- Asia: 1 place, contested by 2 teams.

However, due to the withdrawal of Austria after qualifying (they had been annexed by Germany), only 15 teams actually competed in the final tournament.

A total of 21 teams played at least one qualifying match. A total of 22 qualifying matches were played, and 96 goals were scored (an average of 4.36 per match).

== Format ==
The groups had different rules, as follows:

=== Europe and the Near East ===
- Group 1 had 4 teams. The teams played against each other once. The group winner and runner-up would qualify. Each team had two home games, except for Estonia who had none.
- Group 2 had 4 teams. The teams played two separate play-offs on a home-and-away basis. The winners of each play-off would qualify.
- Groups 3, 4 and 6 had 2 teams each. In Group 3 and Group 6 the teams played against each other on a home-and-away basis. In Group 4, the teams played one match on a neutral ground with the winner to qualify.
- Groups 5 and 7 had 3 teams each. The strongest team of each group was seeded. There would be two rounds of play:
  - First Round: The unseeded teams played against each other on a home-and-away basis. The winner would advance to the Final Round.
  - Final Round: The seeded team played against the winner of the First Round at home. The winner would qualify.
- Group 8 had 3 teams. The teams played against each other once. The group winner and runner-up would qualify.

=== Americas ===
- North America had only one team. The United States would play a play-off with the winner of the Central America for one spot in the competition.
- Central America had 6 teams (including Colombia). The winner of the qualifying round would play a play-off with the North America for one spot in the competition.
- South America had only one team. Brazil received a bye and qualified directly to the final competition.

=== Eastern Asia ===
- Eastern Asia had 2 teams. The winner of the play-off would qualify.

== Format update after Argentina's application ==
Argentina submitted a late request to FIFA to take part to the World Cup in October 1937. In regard of the prestige of the team, the application was accepted. The qualification format was rearranged taking also in account the withdrawal of Japan. Two intercontinental play-offs were established.

- Play-off 1 to be played between the United States and the Dutch East Indies in Rotterdam, 29 May 1938.
- Play-off 2 to be played between Argentina and the winner of the Central America qualifying round in Bordeaux, 29 May 1938.

Key:

- Teams highlighted in green qualified for the finals.
- Teams highlighted in Orange qualified for the final phase of their group.

== Groups ==
=== Group 1 ===
Pos	Team	Pld	W	D	L	GF	GA	GR	Pts	Qualification
1	Germany	3	3	0	0	11	1	11.000	6	Final tournament
2	Sweden	3	2	0	1	11	7	1.571	4	Final tournament
3	Estonia	3	1	0	2	4	11	0.364	2	
4	Finland	3	0	0	3	0	7	0.000	0	

16 June 1937

Sweden	4–0	Finland
Bunke 60', 82'; Persson 65'; Svanström 68'	Report

Solna Råsunda Stadion, Stockholm, Sweden
Attendance: 19,554
Referee: Kolbjørn Daehlen (Norway)

20 June 1937

Sweden	7–2	Estonia
Josefsson 7', 41'; Bunke 40'; Jonasson 49' (pen.); Wetterström 73', 77', 84'	Report	Siimenson 2'; Uukkivi 3'

Solna Råsunda Stadion, Stockholm, Sweden
Attendance: 18,171
Referee: Otto Remke (Denmark)

29 June 1937

Finland	0–2	Germany
	Report	Lehner 6'; Urban 60'

Pallokenttä, Helsinki, Finland
Attendance: 6,519
Referee: Otto Remke (Denmark)

19 August 1937

Finland	0–1	Estonia
	Report	Kuremaa 56'

Urheilupuisto, Turku, Finland
Attendance: 4,797
Referee: Ivan Eklind (Sweden)

29 August 1937

Germany	4–1	Estonia
Lehner 50', 65'; Gauchel 53', 86'	Report	Siimenson 34'

Horst-Wessel Stadion, Königsberg, Germany
Attendance: 15,000
Referee: Bruno Pfützner (Czechoslovakia)

21 November 1937

Germany	5–0	Sweden
Siffling 2', 57'; Szepan 8'; Schön 48', 63'	Report

Altonaer Stadion, Hamburg, Germany
Attendance: 55,000
Referee: Bruno Pfützner (Czechoslovakia)

Germany and Sweden qualified.

=== Group 2a ===
Rank	Team	Pld	W	D	L	GF	GA	GAv	Pts	Qualification
1	Norway	2	1	1	0	6	5	1.20	3	Final Tournament
2	Irish Free State	2	0	1	1	5	6	0.83	1	

10 October 1937

Norway	3–2	Irish Free State
Kvammen 30', 64'; Martinsen 78'	Report	Geoghegan 37'; Dunne 49'

Ullevaal Stadion, Oslo, Norway
Attendance: 20,000
Referee: Peco Bauwens (Germany)

7 November 1937

Irish Free State	3–3	Norway
Dunne 10'; O'Flanagan 62'; Duggan 88'	Report	Kvammen 16', 33'; Martinsen 49'

Dalymount Park, Dublin, Irish Free State
Attendance: 27,000
Referee: Thomas Gibbs (England)

Norway qualified.

=== Group 2b ===
Rank	Team	Pld	W	D	L	GF	GA	GAv	Pts	Qualification
1	Poland	2	1	0	1	4	1	4.00	2	Final Tournament
2	Yugoslavia	2	1	0	1	1	4	0.25	2	

10 October 1937

Poland	4–0	Yugoslavia
Piątek 3', 20'; Wostal 59'; Wilimowski 78'	Report

Stadion Wojska Polskiego, Warsaw, Poland
Attendance: 30,000
Referee: Lucien Leclercq (France)

3 April 1938

Yugoslavia	1–0	Poland
Marjanović 65'	Report

Stadion BSK, Belgrade, Yugoslavia
Attendance: 25,000
Referee: Rinaldo Barlassina (Italy)

Poland finished above Yugoslavia on goal average, and thus qualified.

=== Group 3 ===
Rank	Team	Pld	W	D	L	GF	GA	GD	Pts	Qualification
—	Romania	qualified								Final Tournament
—	Egypt	withdrew								

FIFA fixed the dates for the play-off: the first leg to be played in Cairo on 17 December 1937 (about two weeks after the end of Ramadan), the second leg to be played in Bucharest on 17 April 1938. Egypt did not accept the first leg date and this refusal was considered as a withdrawal from the competition.

=== Group 4 ===
Rank	Team	Pld	W	D	L	GF	GA	GAv	Pts	Qualification
1	Switzerland	1	1	0	0	2	1	2.00	2	Final Tournament
2	Portugal	1	0	0	1	1	2	0.50	0	

1 May 1938

Switzerland	2–1	Portugal
G. Aeby 24'; Amadò 29'	Report	Peyroteo 72'

Stadio Civico Arena, Milan, Italy
Attendance: 20,000
Referee: Francesco Mattea (Italy)

Switzerland qualified.

=== Group 5 ===
==== First round ====
Rank	Team	Pld	W	D	L	GF	GA	GAv	Pts
1	Greece	2	2	0	0	4	1	4.00	4
2	Mandatory Palestine	2	0	0	2	1	4	0.25	0

22 January 1938

Mandatory Palestine	1–3	Greece
Neufeld 21'	Report	Vikelidis 3', 10'; Migiakis 51'

Maccabiah Stadium, Tel Aviv
Attendance: 5,000
Referee: Mohammed Youssef (Egypt)

20 February 1938

Greece	1–0	Mandatory Palestine
Vikelidis 88'	Report

Stadio Leoforos Alexandras, Athens
Attendance: 12,000
Referee: Mika Popovic (Yugoslavia)

Greece qualified for the final round.

==== Final round ====
Rank	Team	Pld	W	D	L	GF	GA	GAv	Pts	Qualification
1	Hungary	1	1	0	0	11	1	11.0	2	Final Tournament
2	Greece	1	0	0	1	1	11	0.09	0	

25 March 1938

Hungary	11–1	Greece
Zsengellér 15', 23' (pen.), 25', 65', 85'; Titkos 18', 82'; Vincze 30'; Nemes 37', 40', 52'	Report	Makris 89'

Hungária, Budapest, Hungary
Attendance: 14,000
Referee: Denis Xifando (Romania)

Hungary qualified.

=== Group 6 ===
Rank	Team	Pld	W	D	L	GF	GA	GAv	Pts	Qualification
1	Czechoslovakia	2	1	1	0	7	1	7.00	3	Final Tournament
2	Bulgaria	2	0	1	1	1	7	0.14	1	

7 November 1937

Bulgaria	1–1	Czechoslovakia
Pachedzhiev 89' (pen.)	Report	Říha 44'

Junak Stadion, Sofia, Bulgaria
Attendance: 12,000
Referee: Rinaldo Barlassina (Italy)

24 April 1938

Czechoslovakia	6–0	Bulgaria
Šimůnek 21', 79', 89'; Nejedlý 57', 77'; Ludl 73'	Report

AC Sparta Stadion, Prague, Czechoslovakia
Attendance: 31,458
Referee: Pál von Hertzka (Hungary)

Czechoslovakia qualified.

=== Group 7 ===
==== First round ====
Rank	Team	Pld	W	D	L	GF	GA	GAv	Pts
1	Latvia	2	2	0	0	9	3	3.00	4
2	Lithuania	2	0	0	2	3	9	0.33	0

29 July 1937

Latvia	4–2	Lithuania
Kaņeps 19', 52'; Vestermans 50'; Borduško 83'	Report	Gudelis 79'; Paulionis 90'

ASK stadions, Riga, Latvia
Attendance: 10,000
Referee: Gustav Krist (Czechoslovakia)

3 September 1937

Lithuania	1–5	Latvia
Paulionis 72'	Report	Kaņeps 4', 45' (pen.); Borduško 11', 30'; Vestermans 67'

Valstybinis stadionas, Kaunas, Lithuania
Attendance: 8,000
Referee: Hans Frankenstein (Austria)

Latvia qualified for the final round.

==== Final round ====
Rank	Team	Pld	W	D	L	GF	GA	GAv	Pts	Qualification
1	Austria	1	1	0	0	2	1	2.00	2	Final Tournament
2	Latvia	1	0	0	1	1	2	0.50	0	

5 October 1937

Austria	2–1	Latvia
Jerusalem 15'; Binder 33'	Report	Vestermans 6'

Stadion Prater, Vienna, Austria
Attendance: 16,000
Referee: Pál von Hercka (Hungary)

Austria qualified, but in March 1938 the country was annexed by Nazi Germany during the Anschluss, and ceased to exist. FIFA offered the place to England (winner of the 1937–38 British Home Championship), who had opted not to enter the competition, but they declined the offer; FIFA decided not to allow anyone else to qualify, leaving the World Cup one team short.

=== Group 8 ===
Pos.	Team	Pld	W	D	L	GF	GA	GAv	Pts	Qualification
1	Netherlands	2	1	1	0	5	1	5.00	3	Final Tournament
2	Belgium	2	1	1	0	4	3	1.33	3	Final Tournament
3	Luxembourg	2	0	0	2	2	7	0.29	0	

28 November 1937

Netherlands	4–0	Luxembourg
Smit 29' de Boer 68', 78', 87'	Report

Stadion Feyenoord, Rotterdam, Netherlands
Attendance: 40,000
Referee: Karl Weingarter (Austria)

13 March 1938

Luxembourg	2–3	Belgium
Libar 4'; Kemp 33'	Report	Voorhoof 19'; Braine 55' de Vries 59'

Stade Municipal, Luxembourg, Luxembourg
Attendance: 12,500
Referee: Georges Capdeville (France)

3 April 1938

Belgium	1–1	Netherlands
Isemborghs 53'	Report	van Spaandonck 37'

Bosuil Stadion, Antwerp, Belgium
Attendance: 47,660
Referee: Arthur Jewell (England)

Netherlands and Belgium qualified.

=== North America ===
Rank	Team	Pld	W	D	L	GF	GA	GAv	Pts
1	United States	To intercontinental play-off							

The United States had originally to play against the winner of the Central America zone for one spot in the final competition. After the application of Argentina, FIFA changed the opponent of the play-off, that would be now played in Europe. The opponent would be the Dutch East Indies.

=== Central America ===
Rank	Team	Pld	W	D	L	GF	GA	GAv	Pts
1	Cuba	To intercontinental play-off							
2	Colombia	Withdrew							
2	Costa Rica	Withdrew							
2	Dutch Guiana	Withdrew							
2	El Salvador	Withdrew							
2	Mexico	Withdrew							

The winner of the Central America zone had originally to play against the United States for one spot in the final competition. After the application of Argentina, FIFA changed the opponent of the play-off, that would be now played in Europe. The opponent would be Argentina.
The course of the Central America qualifying round was quite chaotic and involved several changes of format. In the initial configuration the First Round was composed of two groups, one to be played in Barranquilla, Colombia, involving Colombia, Cuba and the Dutch Guiana, the second to be played in San José, Costa Rica, involving Costa Rica, El Salvador and Mexico. The winners would advance to the Final Round.
In January 1938 México withdrew from the competition protesting against the late inclusion of Argentina in the qualifying process. The Dutch Guiana withdrew too.
In March 1938 the First Round was still to be played, the fixtures being Colombia-El Salvador and Cuba-Costa Rica.
Eventually, Colombia, Costa Rica and El Salvador all withdrew so Cuba emerged as the winner of the group. No match was played in the Central America zone.

=== South America ===
Rank	Team	Pld	W	D	L	GF	GA	GAv	Pts	Qualification
1	Brazil	Bye								Final Tournament
2	Argentina	To intercontinental play-off								

Brazil was originally the only South American team participating in the World Cup, with Colombia included in the Central America zone. Thus Brazil received a bye to take part to the final competition in France.
Later on Argentina applied to FIFA. Argentina was admitted to play an intercontinental play-off against the winner of the Central America zone for one spot in the final competition.

=== East Asia ===
Pos	Team	Pld	W	D	L	GF	GA	GAv	Pts	Qualification
1	Dutch East Indies	0	0	0	0	0	0	—	0	Advance to intercontinental play-offs
2	Japan	0	0	0	0	0	0	—	0	Withdrew

The Dutch East Indies and Japan had originally to play for one spot in the competition. Japan withdrew as a result of the outbreak of the Sino-Japanese War and, after the application of Argentina, FIFA assigned the Dutch East Indies to a different play-off, that would be now played in Europe. The opponent would be the United States.

== Intercontinental play-offs ==
Two intercontinental play-offs were established by FIFA after the application of Argentina to the competition. They were meant to be played in Europe about one week before the start of the World Cup as an anticipation of the proper competition. Eventually, none of these play-offs was played.

=== Play-off 1 ===
Pos	Team	Pld	W	D	L	GF	GA	GAv	Pts	Qualification
1	Dutch East Indies	0	0	0	0	0	0	—	0	Final Tournament
2	United States	0	0	0	0	0	0	—	0	Withdrew

The play-off had to be played in Rotterdam on 29 May 1938 between the United States and the Dutch East Indies. The United States withdrew from the competition in April 1938 thus allowing the Dutch East Indies to qualify without playing a single match.

=== Play-off 2 ===
Pos	Team	Pld	W	D	L	GF	GA	GAv	Pts	Qualification
1	Cuba	0	0	0	0	0	0	—	0	Final Tournament
2	Argentina	0	0	0	0	0	0	—	0	Withdrew

The play-off had to be played in Bordeaux on 29 May 1938 between Argentina and the winner of the Central America zone. Argentina withdrew from the competition for disagreements between the National Federation and the local clubs. Cuba, who emerged as the winner of Central America zone, qualified to the World Cup without playing a single match.

== Qualified teams ==
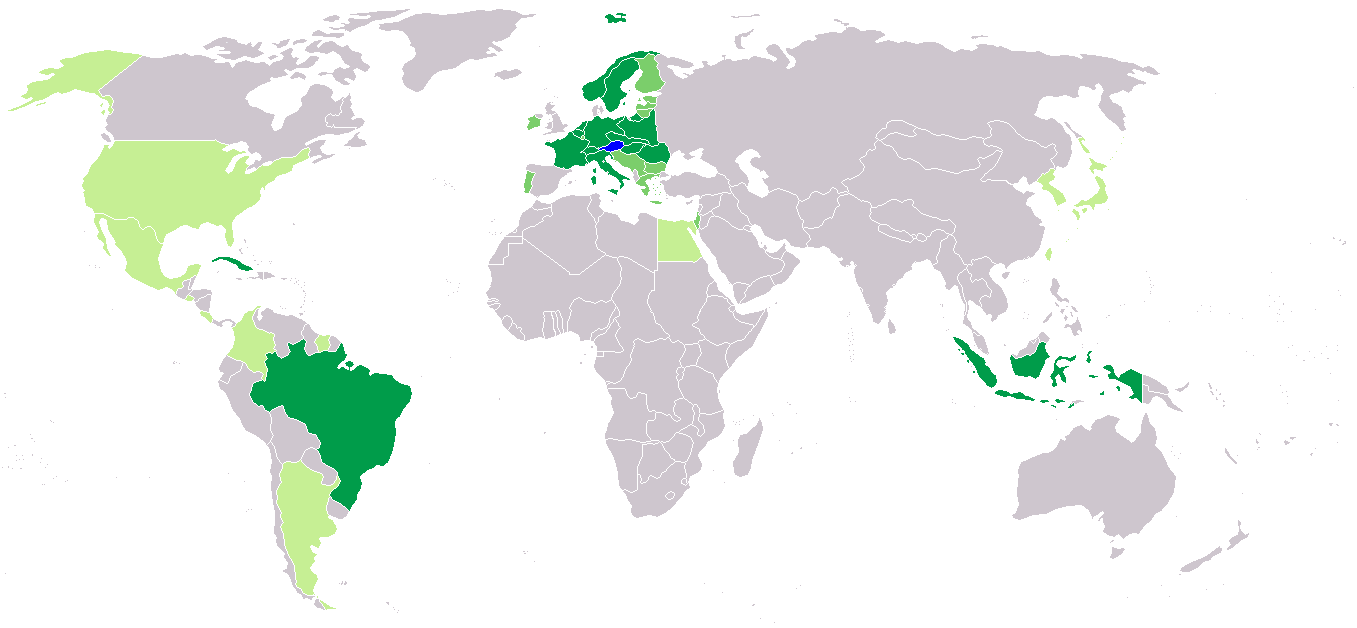
1938 FIFA World Cup qualified teams

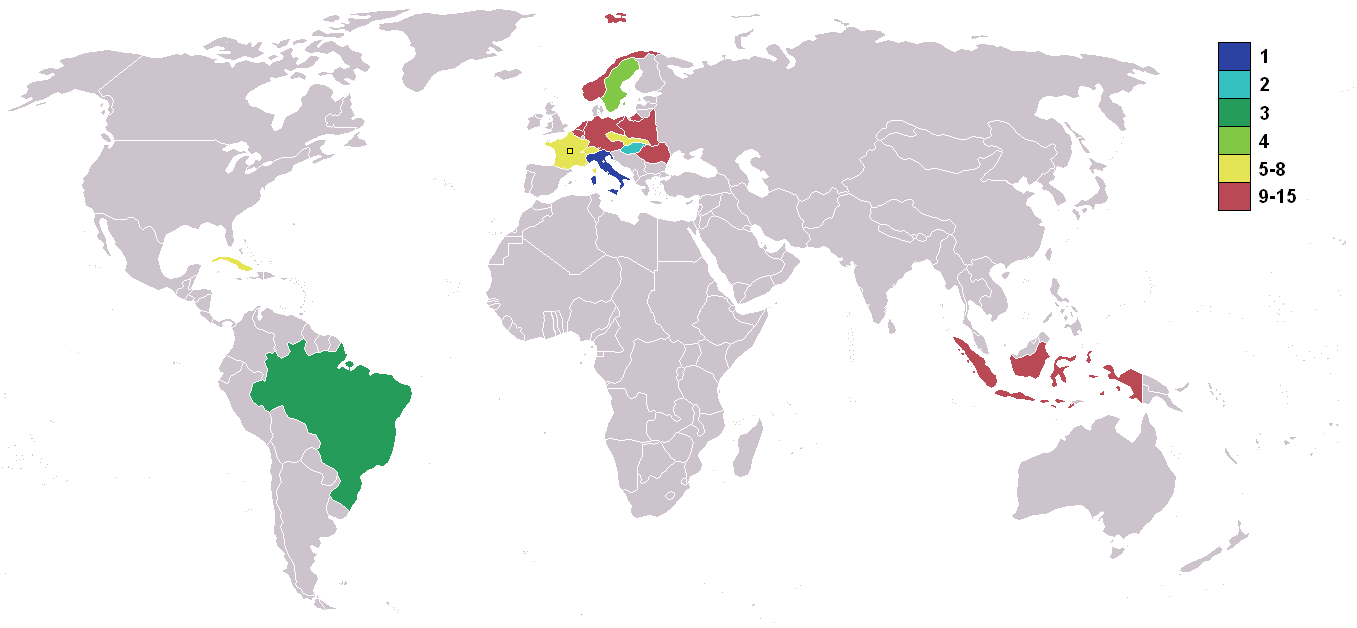
Qualifying countries

Team	Finals appearance	Streak	Last appearance
Austria	2nd	2	1934
Belgium	3rd	3	1934
Brazil	3rd	3	1934
Cuba	1st	1	—
Czechoslovakia	2nd	2	1934
Dutch East Indies	1st	1	—
France (H)	3rd	3	1934
Germany	2nd	2	1934
Hungary	2nd	2	1934
Italy (C)	2nd	2	1934
Netherlands	2nd	2	1934
Norway	1st	1	—
Poland	1st	1	—
Romania	3rd	3	1934
Sweden	2nd	2	1934
Switzerland	2nd	2	1934

- Austria withdrew after qualifying due to the Anschluss.
- (H) – qualified automatically as hosts
- (C) – qualified automatically as defending champions

== Goalscorers ==
5 goals

- (Hungary) Gyula Zsengellér
- (Latvia) Fricis Kaņeps

4 goals

- (Norway) Reidar Kvammen

3 goals

- (Czechoslovakia) Ladislav Šimůnek
- (Germany) Ernst Lehner
- (Greece) Kleanthis Vikelidis
- (Hungary) József Nemes
- (Latvia) Iļja Vestermans
- (Netherlands) Piet de Boer
- (Sweden) Lennart Bunke
- (Sweden) Gustav Wetterström

2 goals

- (Czechoslovakia) Oldřich Nejedlý
- (Estonia) Georg Siimenson
- (Germany) Josef Gauchel
- (Germany) Helmut Schön
- (Germany) Otto Siffling
- (Hungary) Pál Titkos
- (Irish Free State) Jimmy Dunne
- (Latvia) Vaclavs Borduško
- (Lithuania) Jonas Paulionis
- (Norway) Alf Martinsen
- (Poland) Leonard Piontek
- (Sweden) Gustaf Josefsson

1 goal

- (Austria) Franz Binder
- (Austria) Camillo Jerusalem
- (Belgium) Raymond Braine
- (Belgium) Hendrik Isemborghs
- (Belgium) Bernard Voorhoof
- (Belgium) François Devries
- (Bulgaria) Georgi Pachedzhiev
- (Czechoslovakia) Josef Ludl
- (Czechoslovakia) Jan Říha
- (Estonia) Richard Kuremaa
- (Estonia) Heinrich Uukkivi
- (Germany) Fritz Szepan
- (Germany) Adolf Urban
- (Greece) Lefteris Makris
- (Greece) Antonis Migiakis
- (Hungary) Jenő Vincze
- (Irish Free State) Harry Duggan
- (Irish Free State) Matty Geoghegan
- (Irish Free State) Kevin O'Flanagan
- (Lithuania) Juozas Gudelis
- (Luxembourg) Gusty Kemp
- (Luxembourg) Camille Libar
- (Mandatory Palestine) Peri Neufeld
- (Netherlands) Kick Smit
- (Netherlands) Henk van Spaandonck
- (Poland) Ernst Wilimowski
- (Poland) Jerzy Wostal
- (Portugal) Fernando Peyroteo
- (Sweden) Sven Jonasson
- (Sweden) Erik Persson
- (Sweden) Kurt Svanström
- (Switzerland) Georges Aeby
- (Switzerland) Lauro Amadò
- (Kingdom of Yugoslavia) Blagoje Marjanović

== Notes ==
- It was originally intended that the World Cup would be held alternately between the continents of South America and Europe. However Jules Rimet, the creator of the World Cup, convinced FIFA to hold the competition in France, his home country. Because of this controversial move, many American countries, including Argentina (the most likely hosts if the event was held in South America), Chile, Paraguay, Peru, Colombia, Costa Rica, El Salvador, Mexico, Dutch Guiana, Uruguay, and the United States, all withdrew or refused to enter.. Brazil and Cuba were the only countries from the Americas to enter qualification and thus qualified for the World Cup by default.
