= Viktor Ader =

Estonian footballer

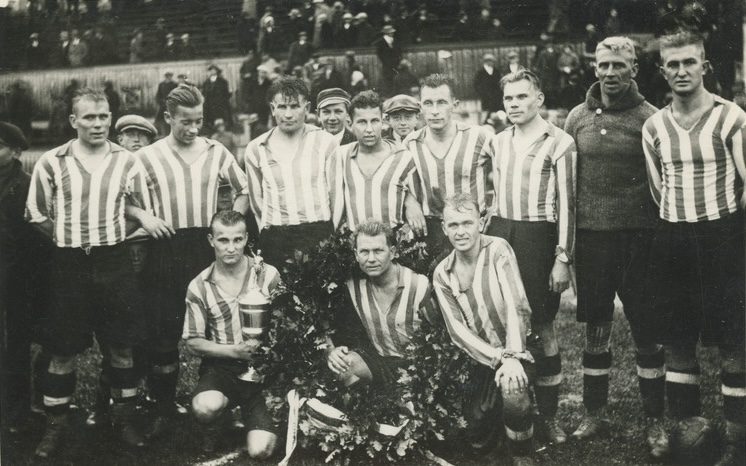
- Ader (second row, second from left) with SK Tallinna Sport teammates in 1932

Personal information
- Full name: Viktor Ader
- Date of birth: 4 October 1910
- Place of birth: Tallinn, Governorate of Estonia
- Date of death: 7 September 1966 (aged 55)
- Place of death: Tallinn, then part of Estonian SSR, Soviet Union
- Position: Midfielder

International career
Years	Team	Apps	(Gls)
1931–1933	Estonia	6	(1)

Viktor Ader (4 October 1910 – 7 September 1966) was an Estonian football player. He was born and died in Tallinn.
