= Kārlis Bone =

Latvian footballer (1899–1941)

Personal information
- Date of birth: 19 February 1899
- Place of birth: Riga, Latvia
- Date of death: 13 November 1941 (aged 42)
- Place of death: Sevurallag prison camp, Sverdlovsk oblast, Soviet Union

International career
Years	Team	Apps	(Gls)
- Latvia

Kārlis Eduards Bone (19 February 1899 – 13 November 1941) was a Latvian footballer. He played four matches for the Latvia national football team between 1920 and 1924 and competed in the men's tournament at the 1924 Summer Olympics.

== Personal life and death ==
Bone was son of merchant Fricis Bone and his wife Anna Katrina (nee Zute) and graduated from Riga German Gymnasium in 1918. He served as a volunteer in the Latvian Army Cavalry Squadron during the Latvian War of Independence between 1918 and 1920. He studied law at the University of Latvia from 1920 to 1929.

He served as an additional magistrate at Riga Regional Court 1928–30, assistant to a Sworn Advocate 1934–36, and Member of Cesis City Board 1936–40. He was awarded the Cross of Merit of the Guard in 1939.

Bone married lawyer Anna Kampe with whom he had two sons. During World War II he (with his wife and sons) was deported from Latvia on 14 June 1941, and died in a Soviet prison camp five months later.
