= Kurt Langenbein =

German footballer

Personal information
- Date of birth: 4 November 1910
- Date of death: 22 October 1978 (aged 67)
- Position: Forward

Senior career*
Years	Team	Apps	(Gls)
- VfR Mannheim

International career
1932–1935	Germany	2	(1)
- * Club domestic league appearances and goals

Kurt Langenbein (4 November 1910 – 22 October 1978) was a German international footballer.
