= François Devries =

Belgian footballer

Frans De Vries
- Devries with Antwerp

Personal information
- Full name: François de Vries
- Date of birth: 21 August 1913
- Place of birth: Antwerp, Belgium
- Date of death: 17 February 1972 (aged 58)
- Position: Striker

Youth career
- 1924–1929: Royal Antwerp F.C.

Senior career*
Years	Team	Apps	(Gls)
1929–1941	Royal Antwerp F.C.	222	(59)
1941–1952	RCS La Forestoise		

International career
1934–1938	Belgium	7	(1)
- * Club domestic league appearances and goals

François De Vries, also named Sooi or Frans (21 August 1913 – 17 February 1972) was a Belgian footballer.

== Biography ==
He played for Royal Antwerp F.C. as a striker. He played with the Belgium team at the World Cup in 1934 where he made his international debut.

== Honours ==
- Belgian international from 1934 to 1938 (7 caps and one goal)
- Participation in the 1934 World Cup (1 match played)
- Belgian Champions in 1931 with Royal Antwerp F.C.
