= Piet de Boer =

Dutch footballer (1919–1984)

Personal information
- Date of birth: 10 October 1919
- Place of birth: Amsterdam, Netherlands
- Date of death: 8 February 1984 (aged 64)
- Place of death: Koog aan de Zaan, Netherlands
- Position: Forward

Senior career*
Years	Team	Apps	(Gls)
1937–1954	KFC		

International career
1937	Netherlands	1	(3)
- * Club domestic league appearances and goals

Piet de Boer (10 October 1919 – 8 February 1984) was a Dutch football forward who was part of the Netherlands squad in the 1938 FIFA World Cup.

== Club career ==
Being able to shoot with either foot, de Boer played for KFC until 1954.

== International career ==
He was capped once, scoring three goals, in a friendly in 1937 against Luxembourg and still has the highest goal scoring average for the Dutch team. Also, at just over 18 years he is now the 10th youngest player who made his debut for Oranje.
