= Henk van Spaandonck =

Dutch footballer

- Van Spaandonck scores (1938)

Personal information
- Date of birth: 25 June 1913
- Place of birth: Roosendaal, Netherlands
- Date of death: 31 July 1982 (aged 69)
- Place of death: Rotterdam, Netherlands
- Position: Forward

Senior career*
Years	Team	Apps	(Gls)
?–1951	Neptunus Rotterdam		

International career
1937–1940	Netherlands	8	(4)
- * Club domestic league appearances and goals

Henricus Josephus van Spaandonck (25 June 1913 – 31 July 1982) was a Dutch football forward who played for the Netherlands in the 1938 FIFA World Cup. He also played for Neptunus Rotterdam.
