= Jānis Škincs =

Latvian footballer (1911–1987)

Jānis Škincs (21 October 1911 – 16 November 1987) was a Latvian footballer, a four-time champion of Latvia. Škincs was known as one of the fastest forwards in Latvian football.

== Biography ==
Skinčs spent the first years of his football career with Olimpija Liepāja. He first played for the senior squad of Olimpija in 1928, the year the club won its second Latvian Higher League title. In the years he played with Olimpija Skinčs won two more league titles – in 1929 and in 1933. In addition Skinčs became with Olimpija a three-time winner of the Riga Football Cup. In the year he won his last league title for Olimpija (1933), Skinčs was the club's best goalscorer in the league (with 11 goals, Artūrs Ķikuts had 10 goals).

After the 1934 season Ķikuts left Olimpija for RFK. In 1935 as a member of RFK Skinčs won his fourth and final Latvian league title and after the season changed club again – this time joining Universitātes Sports. That proved not to be the best club for him and in 1937 he returned again to RFK. After two more years with RFK Škincs completely retired from football. In his last years in football Skinčs was not much of a goalscorer as before, in 1936 he scored 4 goals for Universitātes Sports, in the last season for RFK – just one goal.

Between 1931 and 1935 Skinčs played 11 international matches for Latvia national football team, scoring three goals.
