= Emīls Urbāns =

Latvian footballer

Emīls Urbāns was a Latvian footballer, a three-time champion of Latvia.

Before World War I Urbāns played in a youth football club called Jakor Riga together with other future Latvia national team footballers Kārlis Bone, Alberts Šeibelis and others. His best years in football came in the mid-1920s when he played with RFK (from 1924 to 1927) and with Riga Vanderer (from 1928). When playing with RFK Urbāns won three Latvian Higher League titles and two Riga Football Cups. In 1927 he was first capped for the national football team and in his second match for Latvia he scored his first goal. In total he played 9 matches for Latvia between 1927 and 1928 and scored two goals. In later years as a member of the Riga Vanderer sports club Urbāns appeared in less and less matches and he last played for Vanderer in 1935, although he remained a member of Riga Vanderer club after he finished playing. In addition to his football career Urbāns was a gifted bandy player and even played for Latvia national bandy team in its first international match.

== Honours ==
- Latvian Higher League: 1924, 1925, 1926 (RFK)
- Riga Football Cup: 1924, 1925 (RFK)
