= Albin Hallbäck =

Swedish association football player

Personal information
- Full name: Albin Hallbäck
- Date of birth: 6 April 1902
- Place of birth: Sweden
- Date of death: 18 December 1962 (aged 60)
- Position: Forward

Youth career
- Malmö BI

Senior career*
Years	Team	Apps	(Gls)
1917–1926	Malmö BI		
1927–1932	IFK Malmö	88	(49)

International career
1926–1927	Sweden	4	(10)
- * Club domestic league appearances and goals

Albin "Spjass" Hallbäck (6 April 1902 – 18 December 1962) was a Swedish footballer who played as a forward.

== Club career ==
Hallbäck represented Malmö BI and IFK Malmö during his club career. He played a total of 152 games in all competitions for IFK Malmö, scoring 93 goals.

== International career ==
Hallbäck made his debut for the Sweden national team on 26 June 1926, scoring two goals in a 3–3 draw with Germany. On 29 May 1927, he scored six goals in a 12–0 win against Latvia, which is a Sweden national team record. He won his last international cap on 19 June 1927, in a 0–0 draw with Denmark. He won a total of four caps, scoring ten goals.

== Career statistics ==
=== International ===
Appearances and goals by national team and year
National team	Year	Apps	Goals
Sweden	1926	1	2
Sweden	1927	3	8
Total		4	10

Scores and results list Sweden's goal tally first, score column indicates score after each Hallbäck goal.

List of international goals scored by Albin Hallbäck
No.	Date	Venue	Opponent	Score	Result	Competition	Ref.
1	20 June 1926	Zerzabelshof, Nuremberg, Germany	Germany	1–1	3–3	Friendly	
2	20 June 1926	Zerzabelshof, Nuremberg, Germany	Germany	3–3	3–3	Friendly	
3	29 May 1927	Stockholm Olympic Stadium, Stockholm, Sweden	Latvia	1–0	12–0	Friendly	
4	29 May 1927	Stockholm Olympic Stadium, Stockholm, Sweden	Latvia	3–0	12–0	Friendly	
5	29 May 1927	Stockholm Olympic Stadium, Stockholm, Sweden	Latvia	4–0	12–0	Friendly	
6	29 May 1927	Stockholm Olympic Stadium, Stockholm, Sweden	Latvia	6–0	12–0	Friendly	
7	29 May 1927	Stockholm Olympic Stadium, Stockholm, Sweden	Latvia	9–0	12–0	Friendly	
8	29 May 1927	Stockholm Olympic Stadium, Stockholm, Sweden	Latvia	11–0	12–0	Friendly	
9	12 June 1927	Stockholm Olympic Stadium, Stockholm, Sweden	Finland	1–0	6–2	Friendly	
10	12 June 1927	Stockholm Olympic Stadium, Stockholm, Sweden	Finland	6–2	6–2	Friendly	

== Honours ==
Records

- Most goals for the Sweden national team in a single game: 6 (against Latvia on 20 May 1927)
