= Hugo Vītols =

Latvian footballer

Personal information
- Full name: Hugo Aleksandrs Vītols
- Date of birth: 2 August 1909
- Place of birth: Riga, Latvia
- Date of death: 1965
- Place of death: Riga, Latvia
- Position: Forward

Senior career*
Years	Team	Apps	(Gls)
1925-1927	YMCA		
1928-1929	RFK		
1930-1940	Riga Wanderer		
1941	Spartaks Riga		
1942-1943	Rigas Wanderer		
1944	Universitate Sports		

International career
1934-1935	Latvia	10	(3)
- * Club domestic league appearances and goals

Hugo Vītols (1909 in Riga – 1965 in Riga) was a Latvian footballer. Between 1934 and 1935 he played 10 international matches and scored 3 goals for Latvia national team.
