= Axel Hedström =

Swedish footballer

Personal information
- Full name: Axel Emanuel Hedström
- Date of birth: 10 July 1900
- Place of birth: Gävle, Sweden
- Date of death: 29 January 1972 (aged 71)
- Place of death: Gävle, Sweden
- Position: Forward

Senior career*
Years	Team	Apps	(Gls)
- Brynäs

International career
1926	Sweden	3	(5)
- * Club domestic league appearances and goals

Axel Emanuel Hedström (10 July 1900 – 29 January 1972) was a Swedish footballer who played for Brynäs. He was capped three times for the Sweden men's national football team in 1926, scoring five goals.

== Career statistics ==
=== International ===
Appearances and goals by national team and year
National team	Year	Apps	Goals
Sweden	1926	3	5
Total		3	5

=== International goals ===
Scores and results list Sweden's goal tally first.

No	Date	Venue	Opponent	Score	Result	Competition
1.	20 July 1926	A.S.K. Stadions, Riga, Latvia	Latvia	1–0	1–4	Friendly
2.	23 July 1926	Kadrioru Stadium, Tallinn, Estonia	Estonia	2–0	7–1	Friendly
3.	23 July 1926	Kadrioru Stadium, Tallinn, Estonia	Estonia	4–0	7–1	Friendly
2.	26 July 1926	Töölön Pallokenttä, Helsinki, Finland	Finland	1–2	3–2	Friendly
3.	26 July 1926	Töölön Pallokenttä, Helsinki, Finland	Finland	2–2	3–2	Friendly
