= Knut Johansson (footballer, born 1902) =

Swedish footballer

Personal information
- Full name: Knut Johan Gustaf Johansson
- Date of birth: 22 September 1902
- Place of birth: Jumkil, Sweden
- Date of death: 20 June 1987 (aged 84)
- Place of death: Vällingby, Sweden
- Position: Forward

Senior career*
Years	Team	Apps	(Gls)
- Westermalm
- AIK

International career
1930	Sweden	2	(2)
- * Club domestic league appearances and goals

Knut Johan Gustaf Johansson (22 September 1902 – 20 June 1987) was a Swedish footballer who played for Westermalm and AIK Fotboll. He featured twice for the Sweden men's national football team in 1930, scoring two goals.

== Career statistics ==
=== International ===
Appearances and goals by national team and year
National team	Year	Apps	Goals
Sweden	1930	2	2
Total		2	2

=== International goals ===
Scores and results list Sweden's goal tally first.

No	Date	Venue	Opponent	Score	Result	Competition
1.	18 July 1930	Kadriorg Stadium, Tallinn, Estonia	Estonia	3–1	5–1	Friendly
2.	22 July 1930	J.K.S. Stadions, Riga, Latvia	Latvia	2–0	5–0	Friendly
