= Valerijonas Balčiūnas =

Lithuanian footballer

Personal information
- Date of birth: 27 November 1904
- Place of birth: Minsk, Russian Empire
- Date of death: 18 December 1984 (aged 80)
- Place of death: Pompano Beach, Florida, United States
- Position: Goalkeeper

Senior career*
Years	Team	Apps	(Gls)
19??–19??	ŠŠ Kovas Kaunas		

International career
1924–1926	Lithuania	5	(0)
- * Club domestic league appearances and goals

Valerijonas Balčiūnas (27 November 1904 – 18 December 1984) was a Lithuanian footballer who competed in the 1924 Summer Olympics.

Balčiūnas was a goalkeeper for ŠŠ Kovas Kaunas who represented Lithuania at the 1924 Summer Olympics in Paris, France. The team lost in the first round against Switzerland 0–9; a couple of days later a friendly match was arranged against Egypt and this time Balčiūnas conceded 10 goals. Over the next two years Balčiūnas played three more internationals including Lithuania's first ever international victory which was against Estonia.

Balčiūnas later became an international referee and officiated in five internationals all involving Latvia.
