= Sven Klang =

Swedish footballer

Personal information
- Date of birth: 22 September 1894
- Date of death: 26 February 1958 (aged 63)

International career
Years	Team	Apps	(Gls)
1921	Sweden	1	(0)

Sven Klang (22 September 1894 – 26 February 1958) was a Swedish footballer. He played in one match for the Sweden men's national football team in 1921. He was also part of Sweden's squad for the football tournament at the 1920 Summer Olympics, but he did not play in any matches.

Klang played for Mariebergs IK.
