= Fricis Dambrēvics =

Latvian footballer

Personal information
- Date of birth: 1906
- Place of birth: Liepāja, Russian Empire
- Position: Forward

Senior career*
Years	Team	Apps	(Gls)
1925–1931	Olimpija Liepāja		

International career
1926–1930	Latvia	8	(2)
- * Club domestic league appearances and goals

Fricis Dambrēvics (1906 – ?) was a Latvian football forward, a three-time champion of Latvia.

== Biography ==
His entire top level career Dambrēvics played with the strongest Liepāja football club of 1920s and 1930s – Olimpija Liepāja for which he was one of the leading goalscorers. Dambrēvics won three Latvian league titles (1927–1929) and became a three-time winner of the Riga Football Cup playing for Olimpija. From 1926 to 1928 Dambrēvics played 8 international matches for Latvia national football team scoring two goals. After retiring from playing Dambrēvics coached young footballers in Liepāja, he was the first coach of Harijs Feldmanis.
