= Vladimir Tell =

Estonian footballer (1899–1925)

Vladimir Tell (26 July 1899 – 2 March 1925) was an Estonian footballer.

He was born in Tallinn.

He began his football career at the age of 17, when he joined with the sport club Tallinna SS Olümpia. In 1920, he joined with the sport club SK Tallinna Sport. 1921, 1922 and 1924 the club won Estonian championships. He represented 11 times Estonia national team; he scored 5 times.

He died into tuberculosis.
