= UTC+01:30 =

Time zone

- Time zone

UTC offset
- UTC: UTC+01:30

Current time
- 08:44, 9 June 2026 UTC+01:30 [refresh]

Central meridian
- 22.5 degrees E

Date-time group
- A*

UTC+01:30 is an identifier for a time offset from UTC of +01:30.

== History ==
It was used by the then-governments of the Orange Free State, Transvaal and the Cape Colony from 1892 to 1903 in what is now South Africa. This time zone was also used briefly by the former German South West Africa (present-day Namibia).

== See also ==
- History of time zones in Namibia
- History of time zones in South Africa
