= Roberts Pakalns =

Latvian footballer and manager

Personal information
- Date of birth: 7 November 1911
- Place of birth: Riga, Russian Empire
- Date of death: 17 May 1986 (aged 74)
- Place of death: Riga, Latvian SSR, Soviet Union
- Position: Forward

Senior career*
Years	Team	Apps	(Gls)
1929–1940	ASK Riga		
1940	RDKA Riga		
1941	Spartaks Rīga		
1941	Spars Rīga		
1942–1944	ASK Riga		
1945–1947	FK Dinamo Riga		
1948	Daugava Rīga		

International career
1935–1940	Latvia	8	(1)

Managerial career
- 1949–1956: VEF Rīga
- * Club domestic league appearances and goals

Roberts Pakalns (7 November 1911 – 17 May 1986) was a Latvian footballer and football manager, a three-time champion of Latvia.

== Biography ==
Roberts Pakalns spent almost his entire football career with ASK Riga. He started regularly appearing in the senior squad in 1929 and played until the club's dissolution in 1940. During these years Pakalns won one Latvian Higher League title (in 1932) and won the Latvian Cup in 1943. In between 1935 and 1940 Pakalns played 8 international matches for Latvia scoring one goal.

When ASK Riga as a former Latvian army sports club was disbanded in 1940, Pakalns joined the newly founded RDKA Riga. During World War II he also played with Spartaks Rīga and Spars Riga. After the war Pakalns played with FK Dinamo Rīga first in the Latvian higher league, then – in the Soviet league, in 1948 he played with Daugava Rīga. From 1949 to 1956 Pakalns was the coach of VEF Rīga which he led to the Latvian Cup in 1956.

Pakalns also played ice hockey and bandy. In the former he was a five-time champion of Latvia as a member of the ASK Riga hockey squad, in the latter – a two-time champion of Latvia. Pakalns was also the first captain of the newly founded Dinamo Riga ice hockey team in 1946.
