= Heinrich Paal =

Estonian footballer

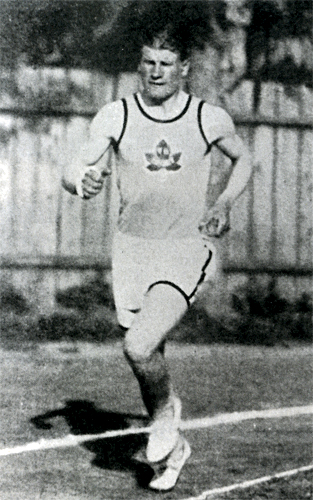
- Paal c. 1922

Personal information
- Date of birth: 26 June 1895
- Place of birth: Rakvere, Governorate of Estonia, Russian Empire
- Date of death: 20 September 1942 (aged 47)
- Place of death: Vyatlag, Russian SFSR, Soviet Union

International career
| Years | Team | Apps | (Gls) |
| 1920–1930 | Estonia | 36 | (6) |

Heinrich Paal (26 June 1895 – 20 September 1942) was an Estonian footballer, bandy player and coach. He competed in the men's tournament at the 1924 Summer Olympics.

He died in Vyatlag, a Soviet Gulag camp.
