= Jonas Bužinskas =

Lithuanian footballer (1917–1948)

Personal information
- Date of birth: 13 February 1917
- Place of birth: Kaunas, Ober Ost, German Empire
- Date of death: 1948 (aged 30–31)
- Position: Forward

Senior career*
Years	Team	Apps	(Gls)
1933–1940	LGSF Kaunas		(46+)
1942	LGSF Kaunas		

International career
1933–1939	Lithuania	13	(2)
- * Club domestic league appearances and goals

Jonas Bužinskas (13 February 1917 – 1948) was a Lithuanian footballer who played as a forward.

== Career ==
During his career, Bužinskas was the captain of LGSF Kaunas. He played for the club between 1933 and 1940, and later returned in 1942.

Bužinskas made his debut for the Lithuania national team on 09 August 1933, in a 9–2 friendly loss against Finland, becoming the youngest debutant for Lithuania at 16 years and 178 days old.
