= Arnolds Tauriņš =

Latvian footballer (1905–1984)

Personal information
- Date of birth: 10 August 1905
- Place of birth: Russian Empire
- Date of death: 20 August 1984 (aged 79)
- Place of death: Milwaukee, United States
- Position: Forward

Senior career*
Years	Team	Apps	(Gls)
1923	Amatieris		
1924–1927	RFK		
1928	Amatieris		
1929–1935	RFK		

International career
1925–1935	Latvia	39	(10)
- * Club domestic league appearances and goals

Arnolds Tauriņš (10 August 1905 – 20 August 1984 in Milwaukee) was a Latvian footballer and a seven-time champion of Latvia in the 1920s-1930s.

== Biography ==
For most of his career Tauriņš played with RFK, but he started playing with Amatieris in 1923 (he played again with Amatieris in 1928). A year later he joined RFK as it won its first Latvian Higher League title. Over the eleven seasons that Tauriņš played with RFK he won seven Latvian league titles - the highest number for any Riga footballer in pre-war Latvia, matched only by Kārlis Tīls and Fricis Laumanis of Olimpija Liepāja. Tauriņš also won the Riga Football Cup twice while playing for RFK.

Tauriņš was notable not only for his club successes, but also for his career with the Latvia national team. His international career spanned 10 years from 1925 to 1935. Tauriņš played in 39 matches for the national team and scored 10 goals, making him the fifth most-capped footballer in pre-war Latvia and the country's fourth highest international goal-scorer. One of his goals brought Latvia victory in the first-ever Baltic Cup.

After World War II Tauriņš ended up outside Latvia, living at first in Australia and later lived in the United States.
