= Stasys Sabaliauskas =

Lithuanian footballer (1905–1927)

Personal information
- Date of birth: 22 April 1905
- Date of death: 16 April 1927 (aged 21)
- Position: Forward

Senior career*
Years	Team	Apps	(Gls)
19??–19??	ŠŠ Kovas Kaunas		

International career
1924–1926	Lithuania	6	(3)
- * Club domestic league appearances and goals

Stasys Sabaliauskas (22 April 1905 – 16 April 1927) was a Lithuanian footballer who competed in the 1924 Summer Olympics.

Sabaliauskas made his footballing international debut at the 1924 Summer Olympics in France, but his team were beaten by the more experienced Switzerland side 0-9 and so didn't advance any further in the tournament, he went on to play five more times in which he scored three goals.

In December 1926, Sabaliauskas played in the first Lithuania men's national basketball team.
