= Arkādijs Pavlovs =

Latvian footballer

Personal information
- Full name: Arkādijs Pavlovs
- Date of birth: 2 February 1903
- Place of birth: Riga, Governorate of Livonia, Russian Empire
- Date of death: 26 June 1960 (aged 57)
- Place of death: Riga, Latvian SSR, Soviet Union
- Position: Forward

Senior career*
| Years | Team | Apps | (Gls) |
| 1922 | Marss Riga | | |
| 1923 | Amatieris | | |
| 1924–1934 | RFK | | |
| 1935–1939 | Kružoks Riga | | |

International career
| 1924–1933 | Latvia | 37 | (9) |
- * Club domestic league appearances and goals

Arkādijs Pavlovs (2 February 1903 in Riga – 26 June 1960 in Riga) was a Latvian footballer and football manager, a five-time champion of Latvia.

== Biography ==
Pavlovs began playing football while in refuge during World War I in Yekaterinoslav. After returning to Latvia he played with Marss Riga and Amatieris for a short period but in 1924 Pavlovs joined the most important club of his career - RFK. Playing with RFK Pavlovs won five Latvian Higher League titles and became a two-time winner of the Riga Football Cup. From 1924 to 1933 he played for the Latvia national football team in total making 37 appearances and scoring 9 goals. Palvovs was a member of the Latvian football team at the 1924 Summer Olympics. Pavlovs scored the first goal in the history of the Baltic Cup and won the first tournament with Latvia in 1928.

After the 1934 football season Pavlovs joined the lower league club Kružoks Riga with which he played until 1939. In 1938 Pavlovs was a member of the Kružoks squad that earned promotion to the Latvian Higher League. In Kružoks Palvovs was the most experienced footballer and the informal leader of the club both on the field and off it.

== Honours ==
Club Titles

- Latvian Higher League: 1924, 1925, 1926, 1930, 1931 (RFK)
- Riga Football Cup: 1924, 1925 (RFK)

National Team

- Baltic Cup: 1928
