= Aavo Sillandi =

Estonian footballer and coach

Aavo Sillandi (until 1936 Nikolai Kleinson; 17 June 1912 – 22 October 1983) was an Estonian footballer and sport coach.

He was born in Pechory, Russia. In 1936 he joined with the sport club JS Estonia Tallinn. Before 1941 the club won several Estonian Championships.

Sillandi was also a member of Estonia national team. In total he played in three matches (all in 1937) and goaled once.

In 1940, Following the Soviet occupation of Estonia during World War II, Sillandi was arrested when working as a police officer, and sentenced to prison for 10 years of prison detention in Sverdlovsk prison camp. After he organized an uprising, the sentence was extended by another ten years. In 1956 he received amnesty. After that he entered again into football life. He was the head coach of football club Tempo Tallinn. In 1963 the club won Estonian Championships.
