= Alfrēds Verners =

Latvian sportsperson (1912–1973)

- Born: Alfrēds Andreass Gotfrīds Verners; 1 January 1912; Riga, Latvia
- Died: 31 December 1973 (aged 61); USA
Association football career
- Position: Forward
Senior career*
| Years | Team | Apps | (Gls) |
| 1930–1933 | Union Riga | | |
| 1933 | Cincinnati Kickers | | |
| 1935–1940 | Riga Vanderer | | |
International career
| 1931–1937 | Latvia | 19 | (5) |
- * Club domestic league appearances and goals
Ice hockey career
- Played for: Union Riga
- National team: Latvia
- Military career
- Allegiance: Latvia
- Branch: Army
- Unit: 6th Riga Infantry Regiment

Alfrēds Verners (1 January 1912 – 31 December 1973) was a Latvian footballer and ice hockey player who played 19 matches for the Latvian national football team in the 1920s and 1930s.

== Biography ==
Verners began playing both football and ice hockey with Union Riga, as it was a common practice among sportspeople in Latvia before World War II to compete in different sports in summer and winter. Verners got a wider popularity as in 1930 Union returned to the Latvian Higher League and unexpectedly earned a respectable fourth-place finish, and won the bronze medals just a year later. In ice hockey, Union was even stronger, winning the first two Latvian league tournaments, thus by 1933 Verners was a two-time champion of Latvia in ice hockey and a one time bronze medallist in football.

On 30 June 1931, Verners made his international début for Latvia national football team scoring a goal and giving passes to two goals to Ēriks Pētersons. In total, Verners made 19 appearances for Latvia until 1937 and scored five goals, he also played for the Latvia national ice hockey team. Verners joined Riga Vanderer in 1935 and won the Latvian Cup in 1936 and 1938.
