= Jānis Rozītis =

Latvian footballer

Jānis Rozītis (20 March 1913 – 3 May 1942) was a Bulgaria-born Latvian football and ice hockey player. In football, he played as a forward and became a two-time champion of Latvia and a Latvia national team regular in the mid-1930s.

== Biography ==
Rozitis was born at Sliven, Bulgaria, where his parents lived before the First World War, his father being Eduard Voldemars Rozitis and Anna (nee Immaka). Rozitis married Eleonora Rozīte in 1935 by whom he had one son. Eleonora died in 1936, 3 days after giving birth to their only son, Leon Rozīte (Brašnevics), soon to be raised by his grandparents, Herbert and Klara Brašnevics. After the death of Eleonora, Rozitis went onto marry Mirdza Rozīte (Bekmane) in 1938.

Rozitis became a mechanic working at motor company VEF in Riga and did compulsory military service in the Heavy Artillery of the Latvian Army during the 1930s.

Rozītis started playing football with the youth squad of RFK. He played his first official matches for the side in 1932 and in 1933 he became a regular. On 10 June 1934, Rozītis made his first international appearance for Latvia as he replaced another youngster - Ēriks Raisters in a friendly match against Lithuania. He scored his first goal for Latvia in a friendly against Estonia national football team on 12 June 1935. In total between 1934 and 1939 Rozītis scored 7 goals over 26 matches. With RFK Rozītis won the Latvian Higher League titles in 1934 and 1935. He competed for the Latvian national ice hockey team at the 1936 Winter Olympics.

After the 1936 season Rozītis left RFK and continued playing with the football club of his work place - biggest Riga factory VEF. Rozītis had been playing with VEF Rīga in addition to RFK since at least 1934 in clerks tournaments but as VEF side was aiming for the top-flight it acquired several higher class footballers to play with its side full-time, and Rozītis was the most notable of those.

Although it was not until 1939 when VEF gained a place in the Latvian Higher League, Rozītis did not lose his place in the national team in 1938 and 1939. He stayed with VEF after Latvia was annexed by the Soviet Union in 1940 and he also stayed there when Latvia was occupied by Nazi Germany in 1941. Rozītis died in an accident on 3 May 1942 aged 29, together with two other VEF footballers – Leonīds Peiča and Arnolds Boka – in Riga, Reichskommissariat Ostland, Nazi Germany - when they were blown up attempting to remove German Army munitions that had been stored on the VEF playing field. The three teammates were buried in the First Forest Cemetery, Riga.

== Honours ==
- Latvian Higher League: 1934, 1935
- Baltic Cup: 1937
