= Iļja Vestermans =

Latvian footballer

Personal information
- Date of birth: 28 September 1915
- Place of birth: Rīga, Russian Empire (now Latvia)
- Date of death: 2005 (aged 89–90)
- Place of death: Florida, U.S.
- Position: Centre forward

Senior career*
Years	Team	Apps	(Gls)
1931	Maccabi Riga		
1933–35	Hakoah Riga		
1935	Hakoah Vienna		
1936–1937	Maccabi Tel Aviv		
1937	Hakoah Vienna		
1938	Racing Paris		
1939–1940	Philadelphia Passon Phillies		
1941–1943	New York Americans		
1945	Brooklyn Hispano		
1946–1947	New York Electrical Workers Union Team		

International career
1935–1938	Latvia	23	(13)
- * Club domestic league appearances and goals

Iļja Vestermans (28 September 1915 – 2005) was a Latvian football forward of Jewish origin.

== Early life and career ==
He was born in Riga. For most of his career he played with the Riga Jewish community sports club Hakoah. He made his debut in the Latvia national football team in 1935 against Lithuania and scored two goals in the match.

In the 1938 FIFA World Cup qualification Vestermans scored in both matches as Latvia beat Lithuania and scored the single goal for Latvia against Austria in the decisive match for the World Cup spot.

In his 23 matches for Latvia Vestermans scored 13 goals. He was the third-highest scorer in the Latvia national team before the start of the Soviet occupation of Latvia in 1940, however, Vestermans had far less appearances than Ēriks Pētersons and Alberts Šeibelis who had a better goal-tally. Vestermans was considered one of the most talented footballers in Latvia, rated especially high for his dribbling skills.

== Later life and death ==
Vestermans left Latvia for Austria 1935 to play professionally in Hakoah Vienna, later playing in Racing Paris and in the United States to where he fled in 1938. He died at the age of 90 in Florida.
