= Alberts Šeibelis =

Latvian footballer (1906–1972)

Alberts Šeibelis (26 December 1906 – 12 April 1972) was a Latvian footballer, one of the most popular Latvian footballers in the era before World War II. In 54 matches for Latvia he scored 14 goals

== Biography ==
Šeibelis was born in the provincial town Sabile. In 1922 he joined the newly founded Rīgas FK which later became the dominant Latvian football club of the 1920s-30s. In RFK Šeibelis for a long time had to play with the reserves squad, however in 1925 he made his debut with the Latvia national football team which was looking to include more young players. In his first years, Šeibelis played mainly as a forward but later he became a central midfielder. He organized both the defense and attack, and also scored goals. He was considered one of the best footballers of the Baltic States for several years. In 1928 Šeibelis was on the Latvian team which won the first Baltic Cup. In the decisive match against Estonia, he organized the winning goal and was injured by a frustrated Estonian forward who could not go past Šeibelis. In 1936 when Latvia won another Baltic Cup, Šeibelis scored a winning goal against Lithuania in the last minute.

In his club career in 1931 Šeibelis left Rīgas FK and joined V.Ķuzes FK and Rīgas Vilki (he played with both clubs at the same time for several seasons). In 1938 Šeibelis with Rīgas Vilki won the Latvian Cup - a huge success for the club which was not among the elite of Latvian football. In 1939 he played his last international match for Latvia as it lost 3–0 to Bulgaria.

After the Second World War Šeibelis lived in the United States, coached a football club in Minneapolis.

== Honours ==
- Champion of Latvia: 1925, 1926, 1930
- Latvian Cup: 1938
