= Vaclavs Borduško =

Latvian footballer (1914–1999)

Vaclavs Borduško (born 3 October 1914 in Riga, died 14 October 1999 in Toronto, Canada) was a Latvian international footballer, a two-time champion of Latvia.

== Biography ==
Borduško was one of the most notable footballers of Polish origin in Latvia. His first senior football club was Reduta Riga – the strongest Riga polish football club of the 1920s-1930s. After the 1932 season he moved to the strongest Riga club – Rīgas FK. However he didn't actually play a single match with RFK and very soon transferred further – to SSS Riga, the local social democrats sports club for which he played in 1933. As after the Kārlis Ulmanis coup of 15 May 1934 all social democrat organisations were banned, SSS was disbanded and Borduško moved to Riga Vanderer. Borduško had a good second half of the season as Riga Vanderer achieved its best Latvian Higher League finish in the second position and won the Riga Football Cup, however after the season he changed the club again – this time for ASK Riga.

ASK proved to be "his" side – that is Borduško played there until 1940 when Latvia lost its independence and the ASK side was dismissed. His first season wasn't especially good – Borduško had problems adapting to his new partners and received few scoring chances and ASK struggled in the league, finishing in a rather sad sixth place in the league. It started going uphill – in the next four years ASK was two times the second strongest side in Latvia and another two times – the third strongest. During the Soviet occupation of 1940 and 1941 Borduško played with RDKA Riga and RGK Riga, in the German occupation – with Bekona eksports in 1941 and again with ASK Riga from 1942 to 1943. In the latter two years with ASK Borduško won two Latvian league titles and the 1943 Latvian Football Cup.

Borduško emigrated from Latvia during World War II. In 1945 he was the head of the Latvian football section in Lübeck, Germany. In 1946 he played with Latvian emigrants national football team, at the end of the year he moved to England, where he also was the head of the local Latvian football section for some time. At the end of the 1940s Borduško moved to Canada where he lived until his death in 1999.

== National team playing career ==
Borduško made his international début for Latvia on 14 August 1934. In his next match on 9 September 1934 Borduško scored his first goal for the national team. In total he played 25 international matches for Latvia scoring 8 goals, including two in the 1938 FIFA World Cup qualifiers. Borduško played his last match for Latvia on 24 September 1939 when he wasn't even full 25 years old. With 25 international matches he was the 13th most capped international footballer in the independent Latvia of the 1920s and 1930s. According to various sources Borduško scored 7 or 8 goals in international matches for Latvia.
