= Georg Siimenson =

Estonian footballer (1912–1984)

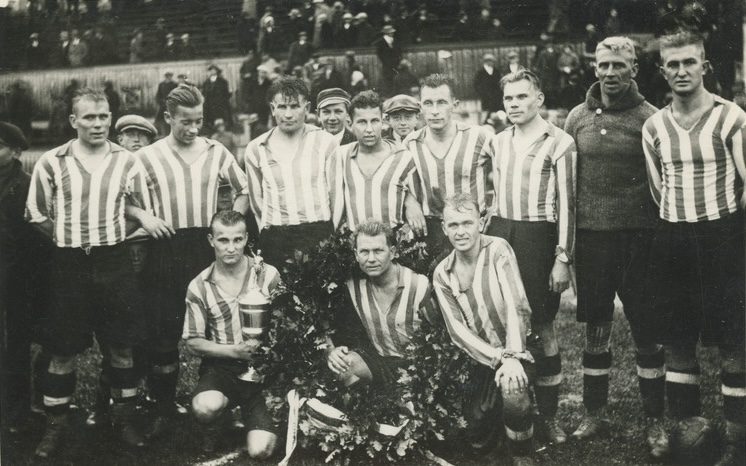
- Siimonson (second row, fifth from left) with SK Tallinna Sport teammates in 1932

Personal information
- Date of birth: 16 August 1912
- Place of birth: Narva, Estonia
- Date of death: 12 January 1984 (aged 71)
- Place of death: Tallinn, then part of Estonian SSR, Soviet Union
- Height: 1.78 m (5 ft 10 in)
- Position: Centre forward

Senior career*
Years	Team	Apps	(Gls)
1930	TJK		
1931	Estonia Tallinn		
1932–1939	Sport Tallinn		
1947–1949	Kalev Tallinn		(7)

International career
1932–1939	Estonia	42	(13)
- * Club domestic league appearances and goals

Georg Siimenson (16 August 1912 – 12 January 1984) was an Estonian international footballer who scored 13 goals in 42 games for the Estonian national side.
