= Karl-Rudolf Silberg-Sillak =

Estonian footballer

Personal information
- Date of birth: 20 March 1906
- Place of birth: Märjamaa, Estonia
- Date of death: 17 December 1974 (aged 68)
- Place of death: Tallinn, Estonia
- Height: 1.81 m (5 ft 11 1/2 in)
- Position: Defender

Youth career
- 1919–1922: Sport

Senior career*
Years	Team	Apps	(Gls)
1923–1932	Sport		
1932–1940	Tallinna Jalgpalliklubi		
1945–1951	Spartaki		

International career^{‡}
1929–1938	Estonia	52	(1)
- * Club domestic league appearances and goals as of 24 June 2018 ‡ National team caps and goals as of 24 June 2018

Karl-Rudolf Silberg-Sillak (20 March 1906 – 17 December 1974) was an Estonian footballer, who made 52 appearances for the Estonia national team between 1929 and 1938. He also made 12 appearances for the Estonia national bandy team and Estonia national ice hockey team.

Sillak was born in Märjamaa in 1906, and began playing for Sport in 1923. He earned his first cap for the Estonian national team in 1929, and became a mainstay in the defensive line in the 1930s.

== Early life ==
Sillak was born in Märjamaa. He began playing football in 1919, at age 13, with the Sport U19 academy.

== Club career ==
Sillak began playing with Sport's senior team in 1923. That year, Sport, who had won the previous two Meistriliiga, lost to Kalev Tallinn. After the loss that year, Sillak and Eugen Einman constituted a strong defensive line which resulted in Sport winning the Meistriliiga in 1924, 1925, and 1927. Although Einman was transferred to Tallinna Jalgpalliklubi in 1927, Sillak also won the Meistriliiga in 1929, 1931, and 1932.

After winning the Meistriliiga in 1932, Sillak was transferred to Tallinna Jalgpalliklubi. He played for the club until 1940, the final official year of the Meistriliiga until 1945, when Estonia became part of the Soviet Union, and the Meistriliiga became the Estonian SSR Football Championship.

Sillak played briefly for Spartaki in the Georgian SSR Football Championship, playing sparingly until his retirement in 1951.

== International career ==
Sillak made his first international appearance for Estonia on 16 August 1929 against Latvia. He was a defensive mainstay for Estonia in the 1930s, appearing 49 times.

Sillak won the 1929 Baltic Cup with Estonia.

Sillak scored his only goal for Estonia on 3 June 1937.

=== International goals ===
Scores and results list Estonia's goal tally first.

#	Date	Venue	Opponent	Score	Result	Competition
1.	3 June 1937	Valstybinis stadionas, Kaunas	Lithuania	1–1	2–1	Friendly

== After football ==
Sillak retired from football in 1951. He died at age 68 on 17 December 1974, in Tallinn.

== Honours ==
- Meistriliiga: (6)

1924, 1925, 1927, 1929, 1931, 1932

- Estonian Cup: (1)

1939

- Baltic Cup: (1)

1929
