= Eugen Einman =

Estonian footballer

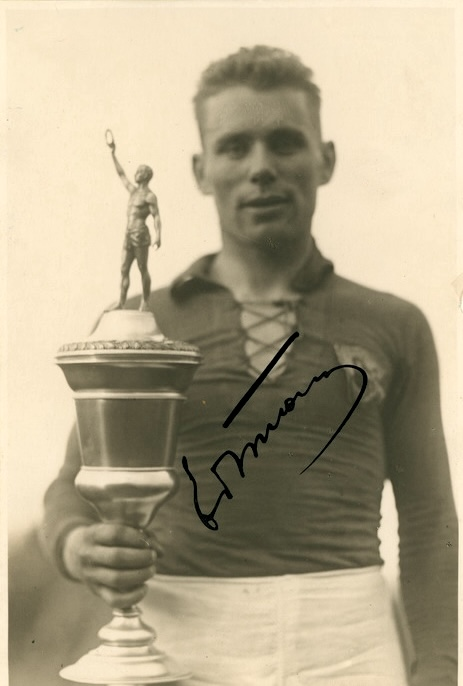

Personal information
- Date of birth: 6 October 1905
- Place of birth: Tallinn, Governorate of Estonia, Russian Empire
- Date of death: 12 September 1963 (aged 57)
- Place of death: Tallinn, then part of Estonian SSR, Soviet Union
- Position: Right back

Youth career
- VS Sport

Senior career*
Years	Team	Apps	(Gls)
1923–1927	Sport		
1928	TJK		
1929–1936	Sport		

International career
1923–1935	Estonia	64	(5)
- * Club domestic league appearances and goals

Eugen Einman (6 October 1905 – 12 September 1963) was an Estonian footballer who played as a right-back for the Estonian national team. He spent most of his career at Tallinna Sport and won a total of eight Estonian Championship titles.

Einman is widely considered to be the greatest Estonian defensive player during the country's first period of independence.

== Club career ==
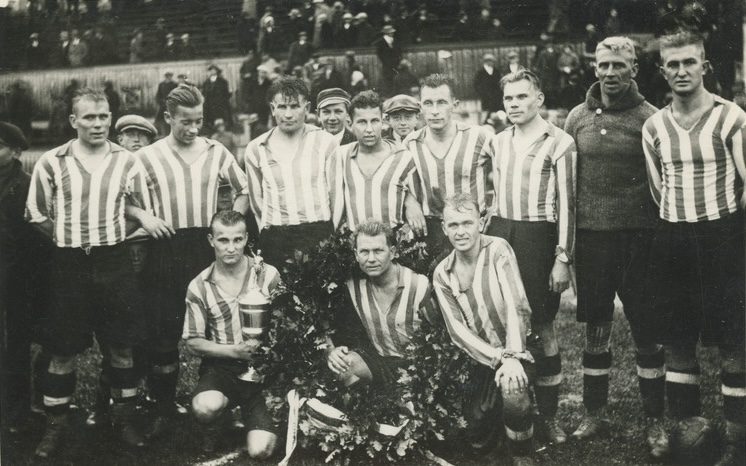
Eugen Einman (on the left) and Talinna Sport with the 1932 Estonian Championship title

Einman began playing football at the Tiigiveski Ground and joined Sport B team in 1920. He was promoted to the first team in 1923 and quickly established himself as a starter. Einman lifted his first Estonian Championship title in 1924, before winning the league again in 1925 and 1927.

In 1928 Eugen Einman moved to TJK and won the league in the same season. He returned to Sport in the following year and again won the league title in 1929, before dominating Estonian football in 1931–1933, during which Sport also performed strongly against top European clubs. Eugen Einman retired after the 1936 season, at 31 years of age.

== International career ==
Eugen Einman made his Estonia national football team debut on 14 September 1924 in a 0–4 loss against Finland. From 1924 until 1932 Einman played in a record 45 consecutive national team matches. In total, Einman made 64 appearances for Estonia and was only surpassed by Evald Tipner (66 appearances) during the country's first period of independence. He also lifted the Baltic Cup twice, in 1929 and 1931.

== Honours ==
=== Club ===
==== Sport ====
- Estonian champion: 1924, 1925, 1927, 1929, 1931, 1932, 1933

TJK

- Estonian champion: 1928

=== International ===
Estonia

- Baltic Cup: 1929, 1931
