= Evald Tipner =

Estonian footballer

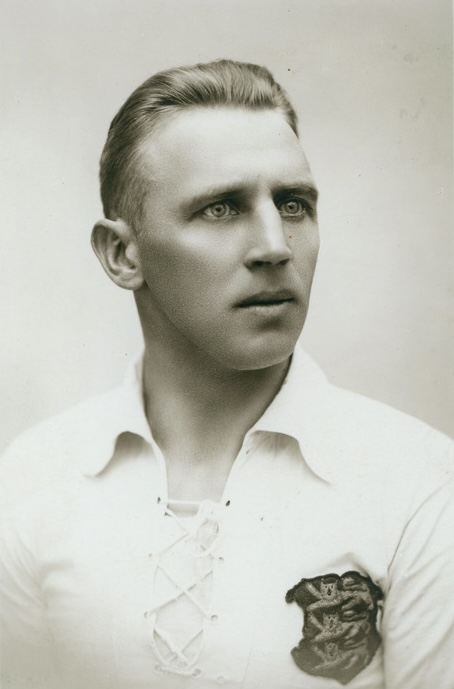

Personal information
- Full name: Evald Tipner
- Date of birth: 13 March 1906
- Place of birth: Tallinn, Governorate of Estonia, Russian Empire
- Date of death: 18 July 1947 (aged 41)
- Place of death: Tallinn, then part of Estonian SSR, Soviet Union
- Height: 1.94 m (6 ft 4 in)
- Positions: Goalkeeper; striker

Senior career*
Years	Team	Apps	(Gls)
1921–1941	Sport Tallinn	112	(18)

International career^{‡}
1924–1939	Estonia	66	(0)
- * Club domestic league appearances and goals as of 1 January 2000 ‡ National team caps and goals as of 1 January 2000

Evald Tipner (13 March 1906 – 18 July 1947) was an Estonian footballer widely regarded as one of the greatest Estonian goalkeepers of all time. He was capped 66 times for the Estonia national football team, 7 times for the national bandy team and once for the ice hockey team. Tipner was also a good track and field athlete.

Tipner was one of the most prominent Estonian sportspeople during the interwar period and was known for his reflex saves and imposing presence in goal. Throughout his career, he earned the nicknames Eesti kuldväravavaht (lit. 'Estonia's golden goalkeeper') and kummikätega mees (lit. 'The man with rubber hands'), of which the latter was given by the Swedes who were strongly impressed by his performance in Sweden in 1927. Tipner was often hailed by the foreign newspapers after his performances on international level and he has also been regarded as one of the greatest goalkeepers in the Northern European region of his era.

In 2012, the Estonian Football Association named the Estonian Cup competition after him.

== Football club career ==
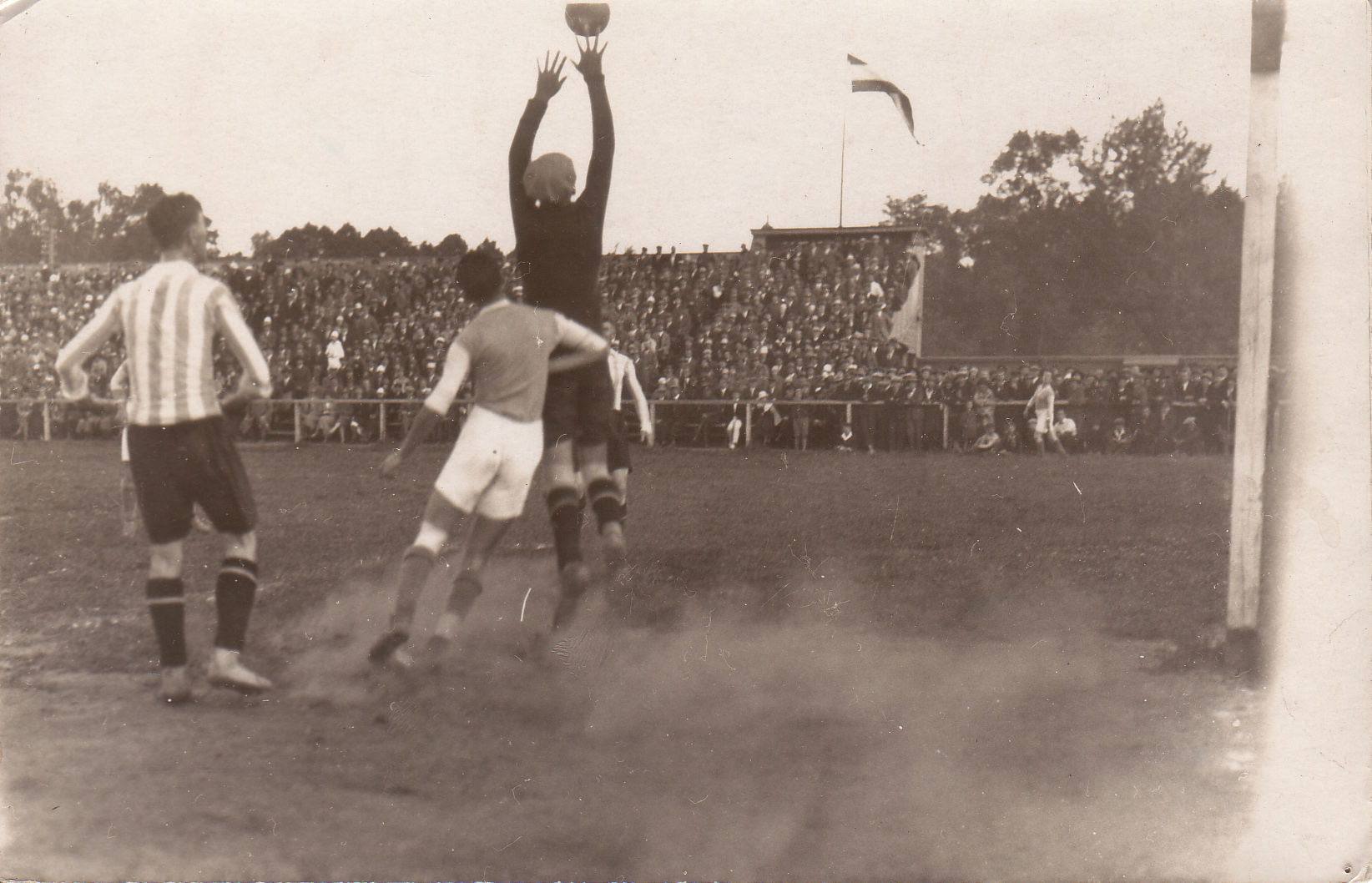
Tipner in action against Hakoah Vienna at TJK Stadium in 1926

Despite reportedly having offers from foreign professional clubs, Evald Tipner played for Tallinna Sport his whole career, during which he was crowned Estonian champion eight times. Tipner also lifted the first-ever Estonian Cup, after beating TJK in the 1938 final. Despite being a goalkeeper, he often took penalties for Sport as well, scoring four in Meistriliiga from 1930 to 1935. Since 1936, Tipner occasionally also played as a striker and scored his first hat-trick on 1 October 1936 against TJK. He scored seven goals in the following 1937–38 season and in total scored 19 goals in the Estonian top division.

After his death on 18 July 1947, Estonian newspaper Noorte Hääl remembered Evald Tipner in the following tribute (translated from Estonian):

"As a result of a long and serious illness, one of the most popular athletes of our older generation, Evald Tipner, died in Tallinn on Friday.... Evald Tipner's fame was not limited to his homeland. His rare abilities were admired in Paris, Stockholm and many other European centers. In Estonia, Tipner was known even in places where there was no interest in sports. When Tallinn was visited by the famous Vienna football team WAC in 1931, then the team's goalkeeper Hiden, considered the best in the world at the time, said of Tipner after the game, "A person can only play as phenomenally as Tipner once in a lifetime." That was not right. Tipner always performed brilliantly - at home and away..."

== Football international career ==
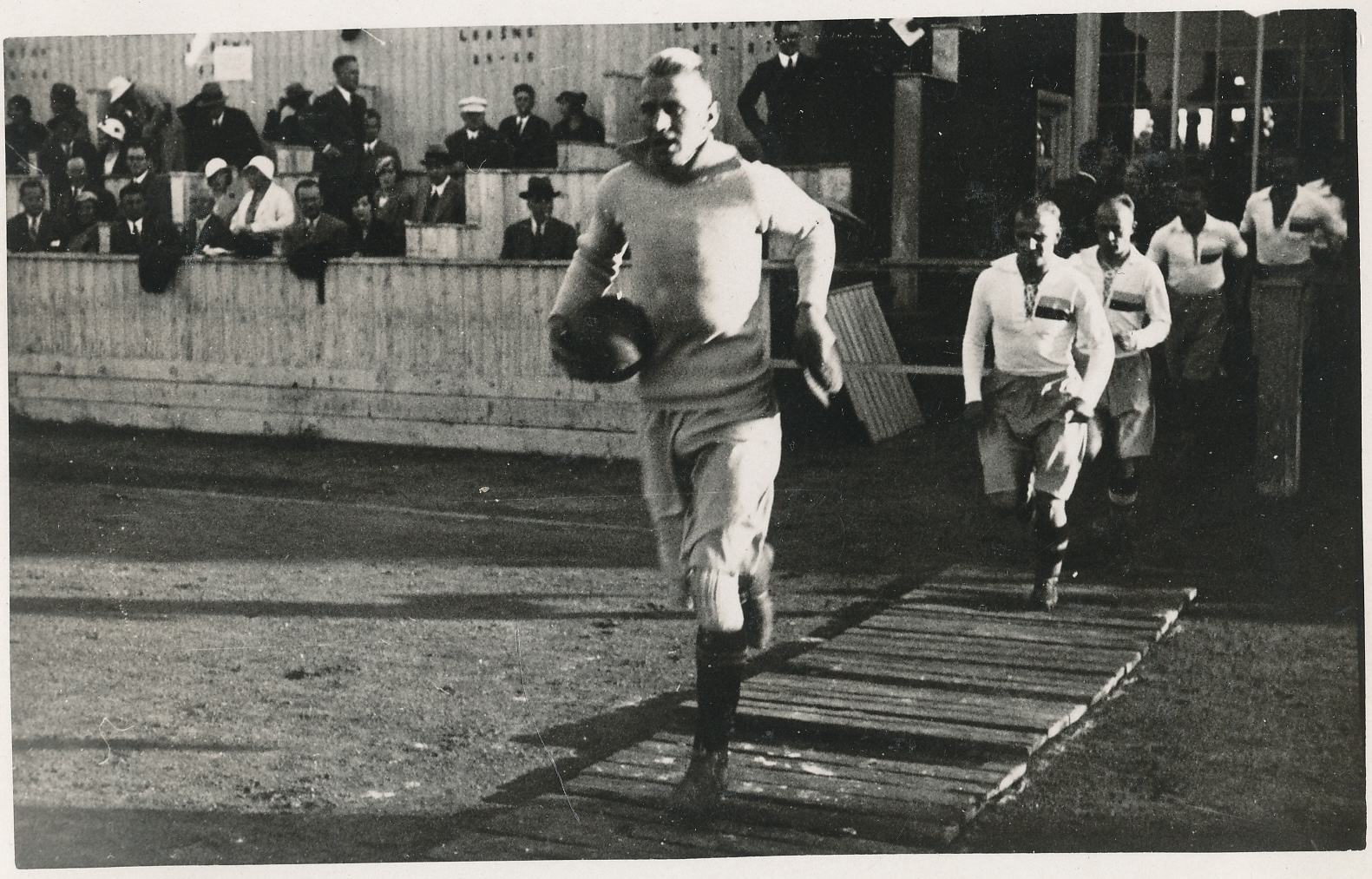
Tipner leading the Estonian national team onto the Kadriorg Stadium's pitch to face Lithuania in 1933

Evald Tipner was first called up to Estonia national football team for the 1924 Summer Olympics in Paris, where he was the reserve goalkeeper behind August Lass. He made his debut after Estonia had been knocked out of the Olympics and faced Ireland in a friendly match on 3 June 1924 in Colombes. In total, Tipner made 66 appearances for the national team and was Estonia's most capped player during the country's first period of independence. He also won the Baltic Cup three times - in 1929, 1931 and 1938.

== Bandy career ==
Tipner played 7 games and scored 9 goals for the national team during 1927–1934.

== Ice hockey career ==
In 1924 he played one game for the national ice hockey team.

== Legacy ==
In 2012, the Estonian Football Association named the Estonian Cup after him and the competition has since then unofficially carried the name Evald Tipneri karikas (English: Evald Tipner's Cup).

== Honours ==
=== Football ===
==== Club ====
Sport

- Estonian champion: 1922, 1924, 1925, 1927, 1929, 1931, 1932, 1933
- Estonian Cup: 1938

==== International ====
Estonia

- Baltic Cup: 1929, 1931, 1938

=== Bandy ===
- Estonian Champion: 1924, 1928, 1929, 1930, 1931, 1932, 1935
