= Johannes Kichlefeldt =

Estonian footballer

Personal information
- Full name: Johannes Kichlefeldt-Uik
- Date of birth: 23 November 1901
- Place of birth: Tallinn, Estonia
- Date of death: 24 June 1981 (aged 79)
- Place of death: Järvakandi, Estonia
- Position: Striker

Youth career
- 1915–1920: Türi

Senior career*
Years	Team	Apps	(Gls)
1921–1926	VS Sport Tallinn		

International career^{‡}
1924–1926	Estonia	9	(0)
- * Club domestic league appearances and goals as of 24 June 2018 ‡ National team caps and goals as of 24 June 2018

Johannes Kichlefeldt (23 November 1901 – 24 June 1981) was an Estonian footballer who made 9 appearances for the Estonia national team between 1924 and 1926. After retiring from football in 1926, Kichlefeldt became a military officer and a policeman.

== Early life ==
Kichlefeldt was born in Tallinn. He began playing football with a local youth team in Türi. After participating in the Estonian War of Independence, he joined VS Sport Tallinn.

== Club career ==
Kichlefeldt played for VS Sport Tallinn in the inaugural season of the Estonian Championship and won. He also became the champion in 1922, 1924 and 1925.

== International career ==
Kichlefeldt appeared 9 times for the Estonia national football team. He was on the Estonia Squad for the 1924 Summer Olympics, but did not appear in their only game, a 1–0 loss to the United States.

Kichlefeldt did not score a single goal for Estonia.

== After Football ==
Kichlefeldt retired from football in 1926, at age 25, to become a military officer. After fighting in World War II, he became a police officer in the Estonian SSR.

Kichlefeldt died in 1981 at age 79, in Järvakandi.

== Honours ==
- Meistriliiga:(4)

1921, 1922, 1924, 1925
