= Tallinna JK Legion =

Association football club in Estonia

TJK Legion
- Full name: Tallinna Jalgpalli Klubi Legion
- Founded: 5 May 1921; 105 years ago as Tallinna Jalgpalli Klubi; 4 January 2008; 18 years ago as TJK Legion
- Ground: Sportland Arena
- Capacity: 1,198
- Manager: Denis Belov
- League: II liiga
- 2026: Esiliiga B, 10th of 10 (relegated)
- Website: www.legion.ee
Home colours	Away colours

Tallinna Jalgpalli Klubi Legion, or simply TJK Legion, is an Estonian football club based in Tallinn. On 4 January 2008, Tallinna Jalgpalli Klubi and Tallinna SK Legion merged into this club. The club competes in Esiliiga B, the third-highest division in the Estonian football.

TJK Legion's predecessor is the two-time Estonian champion Tallinna Jalgpalli Klubi.

== History ==
=== Predecessor Tallinna JK ===
Tallinna Jalgpalli Klubi, or TJK in short, was founded on 5 May 1921 and were one of the founding members of the Estonian Football Championship in 1921. In many ways, TJK were the pioneers in Estonian football. They became the first football club in Estonia to appoint a foreign coach and constructed the first modern football stadium in Estonia, the TJK Stadium.

The club became Estonian champions twice, winning the championship in 1926 and 1928, also later winning the Estonian Cup in 1939. TJK was the home club for a number of Estonian internationals, with Eduard Ellmann-Eelma, Richard Kuremaa and Arnold Pihlak being the most well-known.

Tallinna Jalgpalli Klubi was disbanded in 1941 due to World War II and re-established in 1992, after which the club was renowned for its successful youth system and was the starting point for famous Estonian internationals Konstantin Vassiljev, Tarmo Kink and Dmitri Kruglov.

=== Merger into Tallinna JK Legion ===
In 2008, Tallinna JK and SK Legion merged and the club was named Tallinna JK Legion. Legion continued to focus on youth football. In 2017, TJK Legion set their sights on improving their senior football team's situation, which at the time played in II Liiga, the fourth tier of Estonian football. In consecutive years, TJK Legion won II Liiga, Esiliiga B and Esiliiga and were promoted to Meistriliiga for the 2020 season.

In their first season in Meistriliiga, the club finished 7th. In the following 2021 season, Legion finished in 5th place and accumulated 40 points in 32 matches. However, due to serious problems in the licensing process, the Estonian FA announced that Legion will start the 2022 season with −4 points and imposed a restriction on signing and registering new players. Despite the 4 point deduction and unexperienced young squad, Legion finished the season in 9th place and avoided direct relegation. However, on 23 December 2022 it was announced that TJK Legion will not continue in the Premium Liiga due to financial difficulties and will play the following season in the second division Esiliiga.

== Players ==
=== Current squad ===
As of 25 September 2023. Note: Flags indicate national team as defined under FIFA eligibility rules; some limited exceptions apply. Players may hold more than one non-FIFA nationality.

No.	Pos.	Nation	Player
1	GK	EST	Sergei Bolgov
2	MF	EST	Martin Eensalu (on loan from Levadia Tallinn)
4	DF	LTU	Daniel Gasinski (on loan from Levadia Tallinn)
11	MF	EST	Kirill Belenikin
12	DF	EST	Nikita Salamatov
13	MF	EST	Arseni Terletski
14	FW	EST	Andre Balta
15	DF	EST	Danil Pankov
17	MF	UKR	Vladyslav Panov
21	MF	EST	Daniel Fedotov
25	MF	EST	Leonid Arhipov
27	FW	UKR	Dmytro Ivanov
30	DF	EST	Aleksandr Volodin
31	FW	EST	Ivan Timofejev

No.	Pos.	Nation	Player
33	MF	UKR	Dmytro Samborskyi
34	DF	UKR	Mark Havier
35	GK	UKR	Martin Zukov
38	DF	EST	Lev Visman
39	FW	EST	Vladimir Ištšenko
47	MF	EST	Kirill Vinogradov
51	FW	EST	Denis Ruus
59	MF	EST	Andrei Borissov
66	FW	EST	Vsevolod Pochekutov
75	DF	EST	Steven Mäearu
77	MF	EST	Andrei Bestpomostsnov
88	FW	EST	Nikolai Kulikov
92	DF	EST	Mihhail Tosjatov

=== Out on loan ===
Note: Flags indicate national team as defined under FIFA eligibility rules; some limited exceptions apply. Players may hold more than one non-FIFA nationality.

No. / Pos. / Nation / Player; — / MF / EST / Nikita Ivanov (at Nõmme Kalju)	No. / Pos. / Nation / Player; — / FW / EST / Nikita Kondratski (at Levadia U21)

== Personnel ==
=== Current technical staff ===
Position	Name
Manager	(Estonia) Denis Belov

=== Managerial history ===
Dates	Name
2009–2011	(Estonia) Viktor Passikuta
2013–2015	(Estonia) Viktor Passikuta
2016–	(Estonia) Denis Belov

== Honours ==
=== League ===
- Esiliiga
  - Winners (1): 2019
- Esiliiga B
  - Winners (1): 2018

=== Youth (International) ===
- Gothia Cup
  - Winners (1): 2014 (Boys 2003)

== Statistics ==
=== League and Cup ===
Season	Division	Pos	Pld	W	D	L	GF	GA	GD	Pts	Top Goalscorer	Estonian Cup
2008	II Liiga E/N	2	26	20	4	2	68	24	+44	64	(Estonia) Sergei Dõmov (10)	–
2009	Esiliiga	6	36	13	5	18	63	76	−13	44	(Estonia) Maksim Kisseljov (17)	–
2010	Esiliiga	6	36	11	6	19	57	81	−24	39	(Estonia) Maksim Kisseljov (14)	First round
2011	Esiliiga	9	36	7	6	23	44	104	−60	27	(Estonia) Maksim Kisseljov (Estonia) Roman Sirotkin (10)	Second round
2012	II Liiga E/N	4	26	14	7	5	63	38	+25	49	(Estonia) Maksim Gussev (15)	Second round
2013	Esiliiga B	7	36	13	5	18	55	77	−22	44	(Estonia) Rauf-Roman Mikailov (8)	First round
2014	Esiliiga B	10	36	7	6	23	53	111	−58	27	(Estonia) Rauf-Roman Mikailov (10)	Third round
2015	II Liiga E/N	14	36	5	2	19	40	84	−48	17	(Estonia) Maksim Kisseljov (6)	–
2016	II Liiga E/N	8	36	11	1	14	55	61	-6	34	(Estonia) Stefan Tšendei (14)	Second round
2017	II Liiga E/N	1	36	19	3	4	119	39	+80	60	(Estonia) Rejal Alijev (33)	Second round
2018	Esiliiga B	1	36	32	2	2	125	31	+94	98	(Estonia) Rejal Alijev (20)	Fourth round
2019	Esiliiga	1	36	28	5	3	127	35	+92	89	(Estonia) Rejal Alijev (38)	Second round
2020	Meistriliiga	7	30	8	7	15	26	44	-18	31	(Russia) Nikita Andreev (10)	Second round
2021	Meistriliiga	5	32	11	7	14	49	48	+1	40	(Estonia) Aleksandr Šapovalov (11)	Fourth round
2022	Meistriliiga	9	36	6	8	22	34	82	-48	22	(Estonia) Nikita Ivanov (11)	Quarter-finals
2023	Esiliiga	9	36	5	6	25	37	97	-60	21	(Estonia) Denis Ruus (10)	Third round
