= 1930 Estonian Football Championship =

Estonian Championship
- Season: 1930
- Champions: ESS Kalev Tallinn (2nd title)
- Matches played: 6
- Goals scored: 31 (5.17 per match)
- Top goalscorer: Valter Biiber (5)
- Highest scoring: Kalev 11–0 Võitleja

The 1930 Estonian Football Championship was the 10th official football league season in Estonia. Only four teams, three from Tallinn and one from Narva, took part in the league. All the matches were played in Tallinn and each team played every opponent once for total of 3 games. ESS Kalev Tallinn won their second title.

== League table ==
Pos	Team	Pld	W	D	L	GF	GA	GD	Pts	KAL	VSS	TJK	VÕI
1	ESS Kalev Tallinn (C)	3	2	1	0	13	1	+12	5		0–0	2–1	11–0
2	VS Sport Tallinn	3	2	1	0	9	1	+8	5			3–0	6–1
3	Tallinna Jalgpalliklubi	3	1	0	2	7	6	+1	2				6–1
4	KS Võitleja Narva	3	0	0	3	2	23	−21	0				

(C) Champions

== Top scorers ==
Pos	Name	Team	Gls
1	Valter Biiber	VS Sport Tallinn	5
3	Aleksander Gerassimov-Kalvet	ESS Kalev Tallinn	4
3	Erich Jõers	ESS Kalev Tallinn	4
3	Theodor Strandberg	ESS Kalev Tallinn	4
