= 1926 Estonian Football Championship =

1926 Estonian Championship
Final positions
- Champions: Tallinna Jalgpalliklubi (1st title)

The 1926 Estonian Football Championship was the sixth top-division football league season in Estonia. Nine teams, seven from Tallinn and one from Pärnu, Narva took part in the league. It was played as a knock-out tournament. Tallinna Jalgpalliklubi won the championship for the first time in the club's history.

== Preliminary round ==
Date	Team 1	Score	Team 2
	Tallinna Jalgpalliklubi	4–0	KS Võitleja Narva

== Quarter-finals ==
Date	Team 1	Score	Team 2
	Tallinna Jalgpalliklubi	6–0	Nõmme SS Kalju
	Sirius Tallinn	5–0	Võitleja Tallinn
	ESS Kalev Tallinn	4–1	Meteor Tallinn
	VS Sport Tallinn	w/o	JK Tervis Pärnu

== Semi-finals ==
Date	Team 1	Score	Team 2
	Tallinna Jalgpalliklubi	6–0	ESS Kalev Tallinn
	VS Sport Tallinn	1–0	Sirius Tallinn

== Final ==
Date	Team 1	Score	Team 2
	Tallinna Jalgpalliklubi	4–1	VS Sport Tallinn

== Top goalscorers ==
- Eduard Ellman-Eelma (Tallinna Jalgpalliklubi) – 6 goals
- Arnold Pihlak (Tallinna Jalgpalliklubi) – 6 goals
