= Tiigiveski Ground =

Former football ground in Tallinn, Estonia

- Tiigiveski jalgpalliväljak / Tiigiveski spordiplats
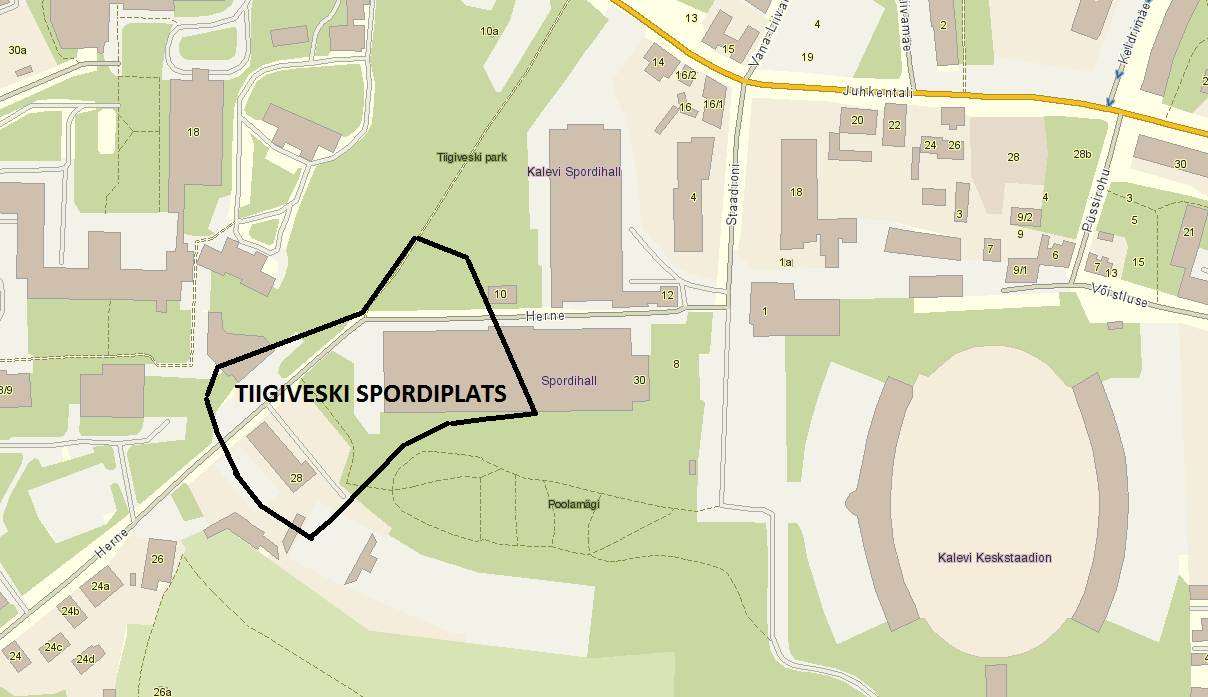
- Location of the Tiigiveski Ground on a modern-day map
- Location: Tallinn, Estonia
- Coordinates: 59°25′36.03″N 24°45′30.2″E
- Field size: 100 × 79 m
- Opened: May 1913; 111 years ago
- Closed: 1922 (for competitions)

Tiigiveski Ground (Estonian: Tiigiveski jalgpalliväljak) was a football ground in Tallinn, Estonia. Opened in 1913, it was the first football specific ground in Tallinn and the first home for the Estonia national football team and for numerous Tallinn football clubs.

== History ==
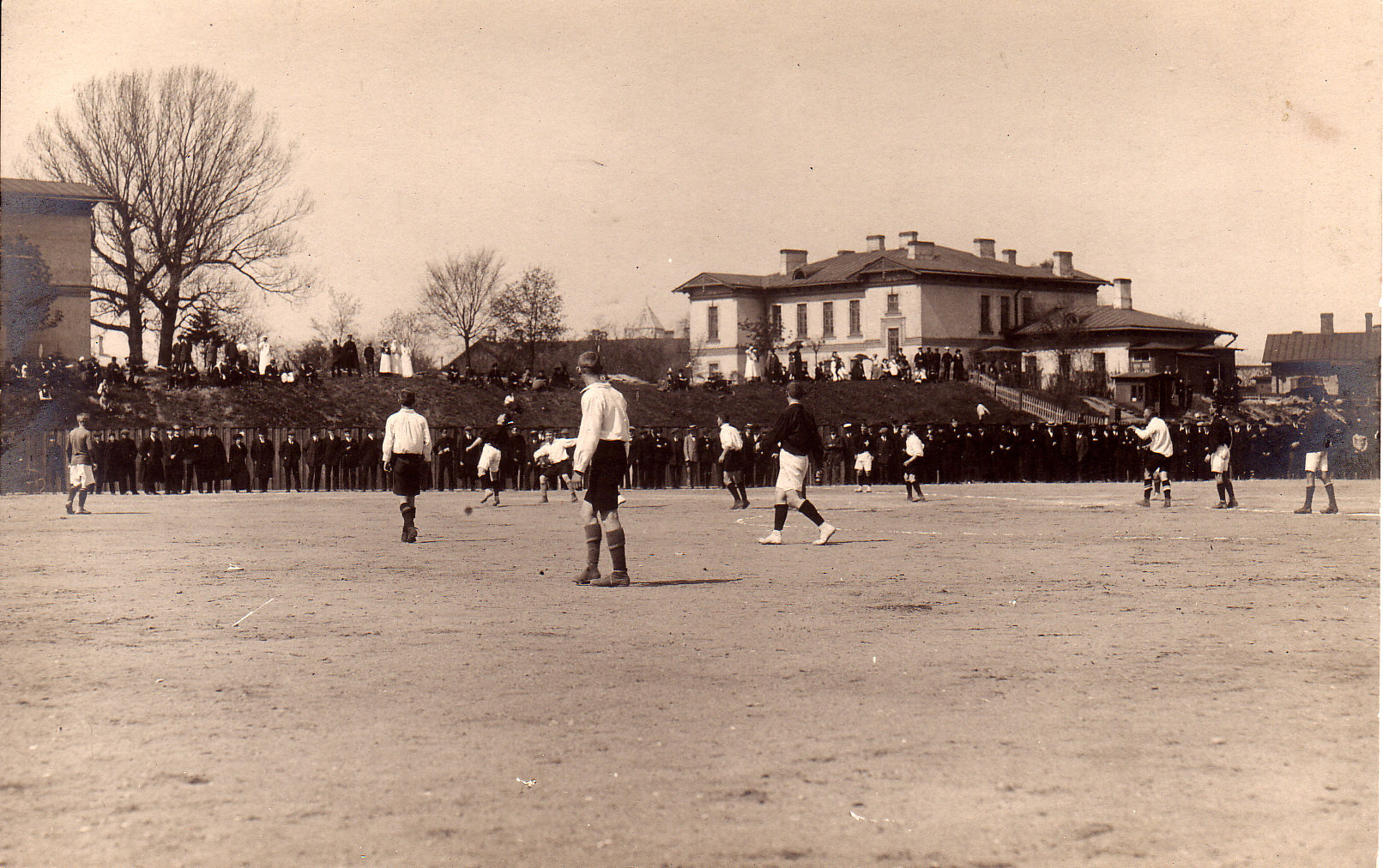
Tiigiveski hosting Kalev - Helsinki IFK in 1913

Tiigiveski Football Ground was opened to public in May 1913 and quickly become the most popular sports field in the city. Located in Tiigiveski Park and next to the Härjapea river, the ground hosted the matches of the popular Estonian football clubs Kalev, Sport and TJK, as well as their international fixtures against Finnish clubs, such as HIFK and Kisa-Veikot.

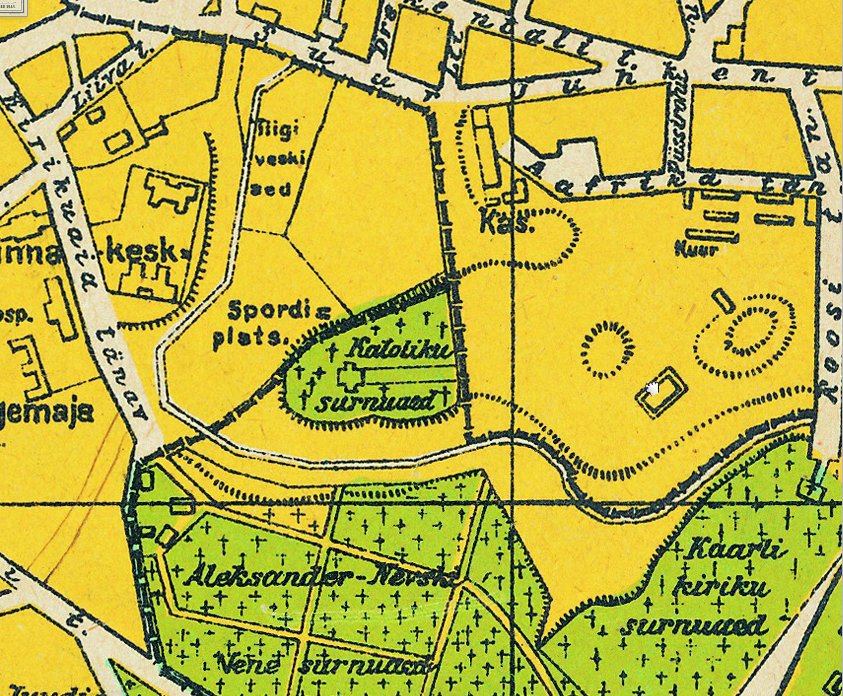
Tiigiveski Ground (spordiplats) on a map from 1928

Tiigiveski was the venue for the first two Estonia national football team home matches, when they faced Sweden and Finland in 1921.

In the autumn of the same year, Tiigiveski Ground also hosted the first-ever Estonian Football Championship. However, the ground had become so heavily used that the Central Hospital, which was located next to the Tiigiveski Park, complained to the City Government that the constant noise has become unbearable and disturbed the well-being of the hospital's patients. On 12 April 1922, the mayor of Tallinn Anton Uesson bans organising any further competitions in Tiigiveski.

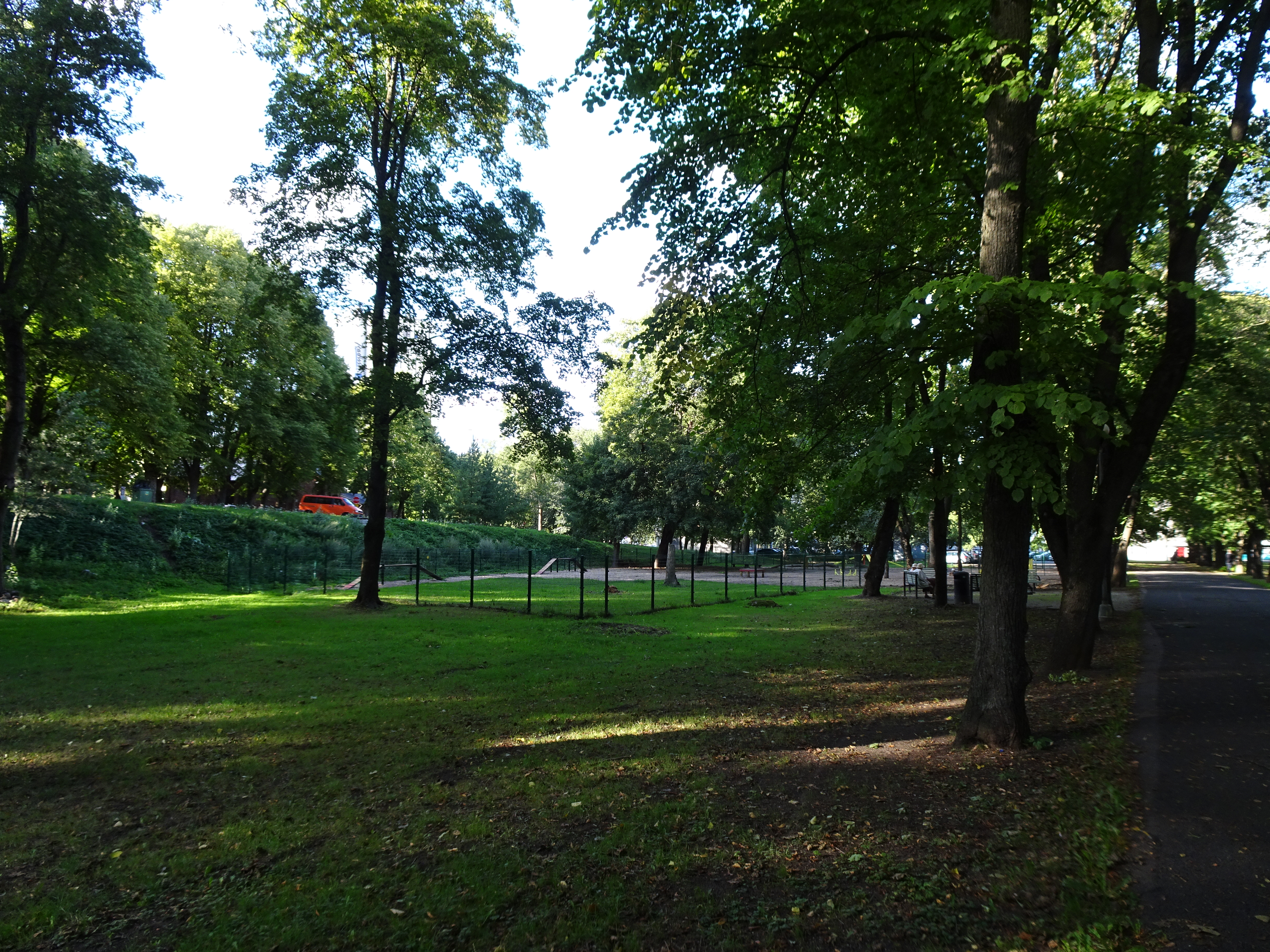
Tiigiveski Park today, the hill that was once used by the spectators is visible in the background

After the completion of Wismari Stadium, as well as Kalevi Aed and Kadriorg Stadium in the 1920s, Tiigiveski Football Ground slowly fades into history.

== Estonia national team matches ==
Tiigiveski was the first home ground for the Estonia national football team. After Estonia had played their inaugural football match as a national team in Helsinki against Finland in 1920, they hosted Sweden the following year. The match finished in a 0–0 draw. Estonia hosted Finland the following month and that proved to be the last official national team match held in Tiigiveski, as the team moved to Kalevi Aed after its completion in 1923.

Date		Result	Competition	Attendance
22 July 1921	Estonia – Sweden	0–0	Friendly	3,500
28 August 1921	Estonia – Finland	0–3	Friendly	2,500
