= TJK Stadium =

Former football stadium in Tallinn, Estonia

Coordinates: 59°26′24.6″N 24°46′52.6″E

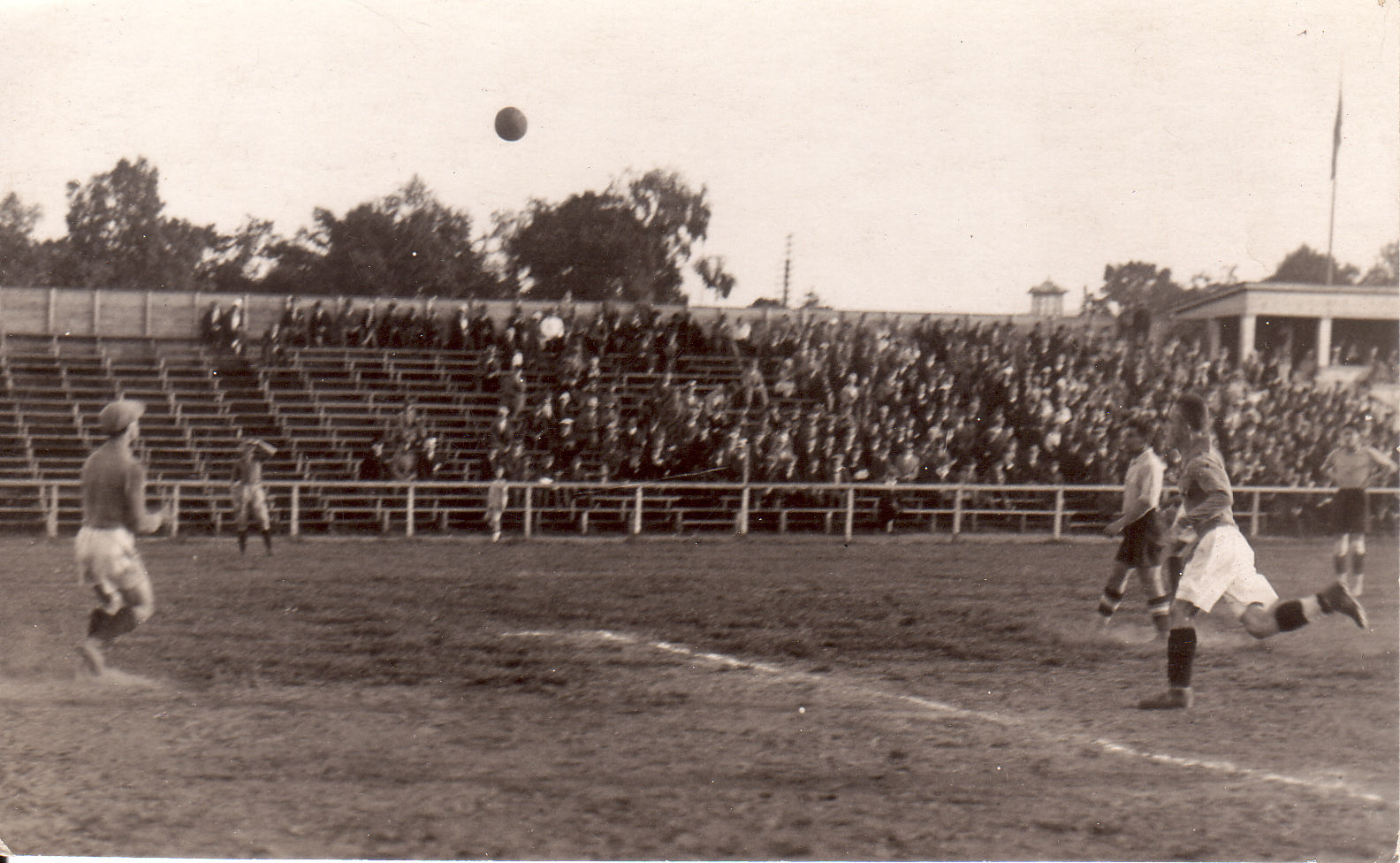
- Address: Narva mnt 65
- Location: Kadriorg, Tallinn, Estonia
- Capacity: 3,740
- Field size: 104 × 74 m
- Surface: Grass

Construction
- Opened: 1925; 100 years ago
- Renovated: 1951 (as ETKVL staadion)
- Demolished: 2004
- Architect: Karl Burman

Tenants
- Tallinna Jalgpalli Klubi (1925–1940)

TJK Stadium, also known as TJK jalgpalliväli (English: TJK Football Ground), was a football stadium in Tallinn, Estonia, and the home of TJK. Opened in 1925, its wooden grandstand could seat 3,740 and with its additional standing capacity of 6,000, the stadium was able to facilitate nearly 10,000 spectators. The stadium was located in the subdistrict of Kadriorg near the Kadriorg beach and the Tallinn Harbour. Today, the site of the former stadium is occupied by Kadriorg's Business Center and Liivaoja apartment buildings.

== History ==
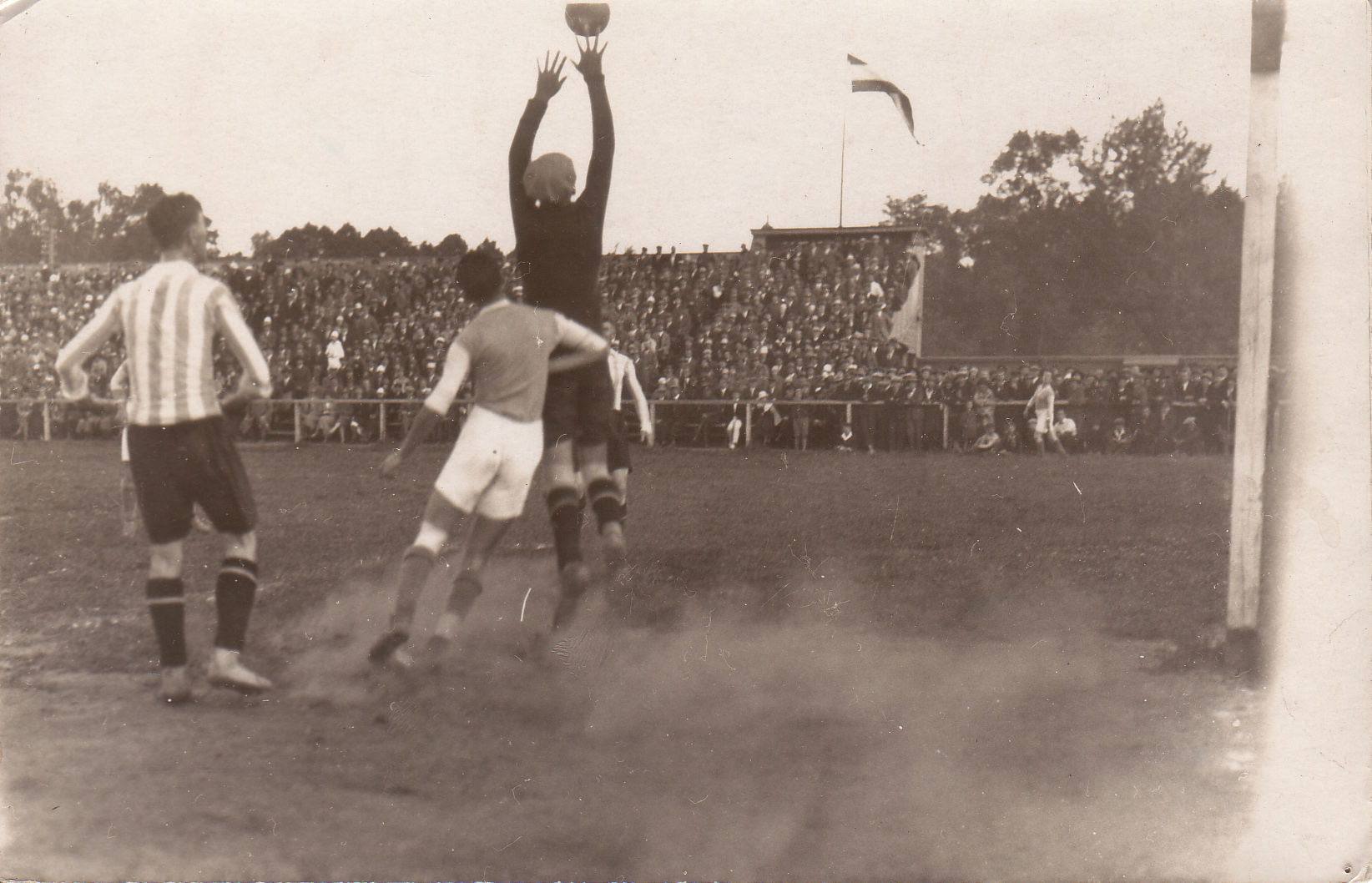
TJK Stadium in 1926, hosting VS Sport's match against Hakoah Vienna, the Austrian champions of the previous year

After being founded in 1921, TJK actively began looking for a site to construct their own football ground. Initially, the club eyed a field in the Kalamaja subdistrict, but the Tallinn City Government saw an area located next to Narva maantee and near the Kadriorg beach more suitable for football. In 1923, the city rented the field to TJK, who began constructing the 120-meter long wooden grandstand in April 1925. The stadium was opened in August 1925.

Upon completion, it became the first football stadium in Estonia to have a natural grass surface, as previously used Tiigiveski Ground, Wismari Stadium and Kalevi Aed all had gravely or sandy surfaces. TJK Stadium's grandstand was able to seat 3,740 spectators and the stadium also had a further standing capacity of 6,000, making it the largest stadium in the country until Kadriorg Stadium overtook the throne. In the following years, in addition to being the home ground of TJK, the stadium also hosted numerous international football matches of the other Tallinn football clubs, such as Sport and Kalev. On 10 August 1927, the stadium hosted its first and only Estonia national team match, when they defeated Finland 2–1.

TJK Stadium was destroyed in the Second World War, after which Estonia was occupied by the Soviet Union and TJK dissolved altogether.

The former football stadium was reconstructed in 1951 as a smaller sized multi-purpose stadium and was named as ETKVL staadion. However, due to its improper dimensions, the new stadium was unable to hold any official athletics or football competition. The stadium was fully closed in 2004, when the construction of the Liivaoja residential quarter began.

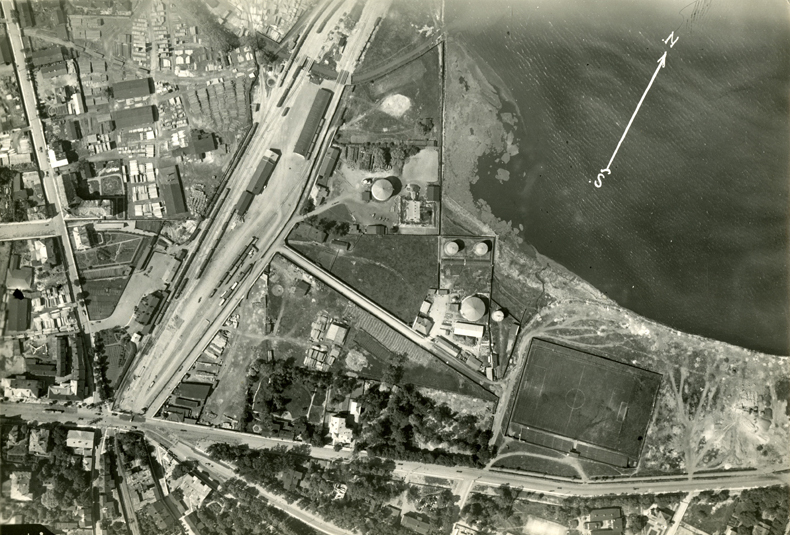
TJK Stadium from above in late 1920s/early 1930s

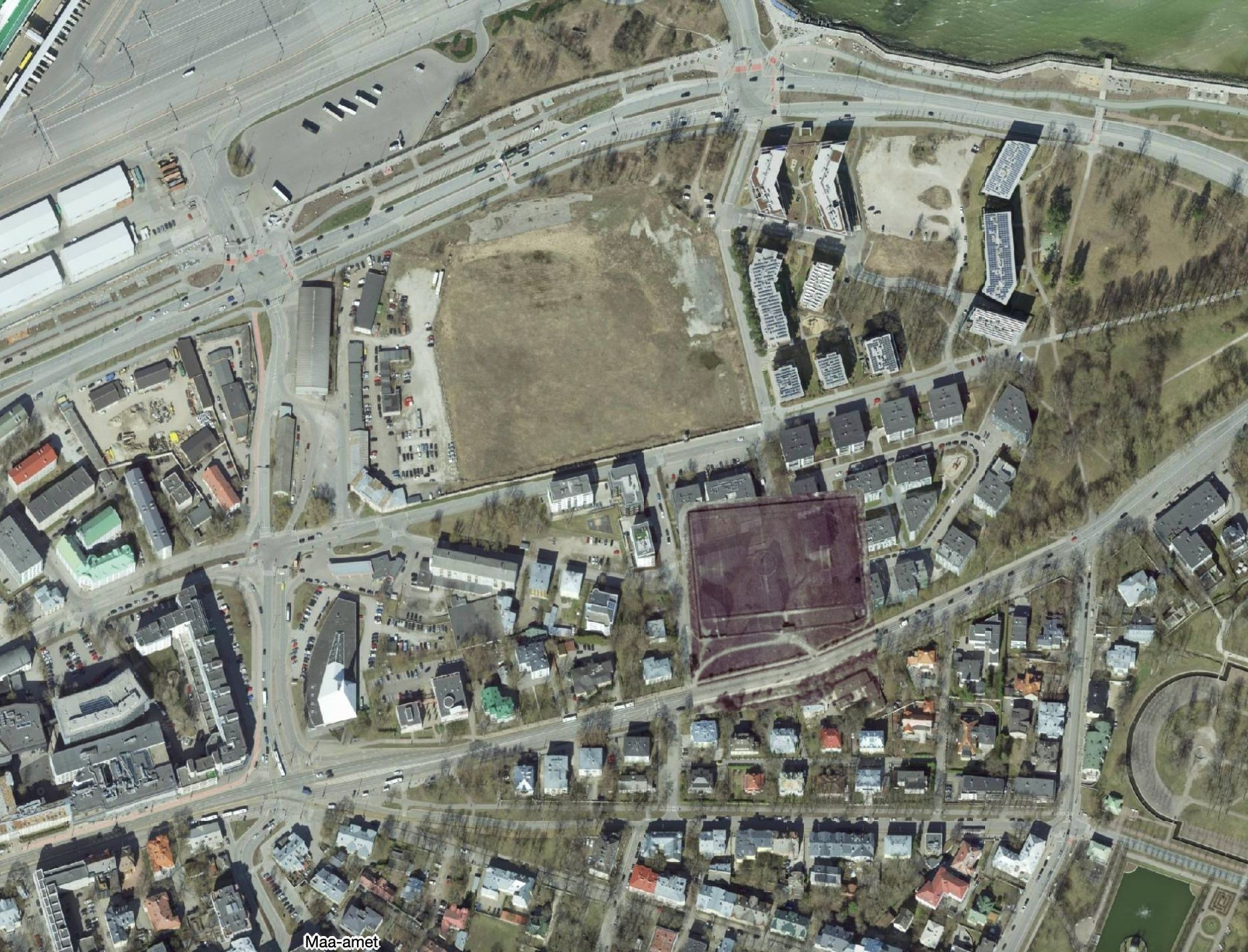
The former TJK Stadium overlaid onto a map from 2023

== Estonia national team matches ==
TJK Stadium hosted the Estonia national football team once, when Estonia defeated Finland 2–1 on 10 August 1927. The newspapers evaluated Estonia's victory against their northern neighbours as convincing and deserved. Despite Finland's longer football culture and traditions, the assistant chairman of the Finnish FA Lauri Tanner admitted after the match that Estonia have surprisingly now surpassed Finland in football.

Date		Result	Competition	Attendance
10 August 1927	Estonia – Finland	2–1	Friendly	5,000

== See also ==
- Tiigiveski Ground
- Wismari Stadium
- Kalevi Aed
- Kadriorg Stadium

== External sources ==
- (Video footage) Hakoah Vienna and Budapest Vivo facing local clubs TJK and Sport at the TJK Stadium in the August of 1926
