= 1922 Estonian Football Championship =

1922 Estonian Championship
Final positions
- Champions: VS Sport Tallinn

The 1922 Estonian Football Championship was the second football league season in Estonia. It was played as a knock-out tournament between October 10 and October 29. Four teams took part in the competition – three from Tallinn and one from Narva. All the games were played at Wismari Stadium in Tallinn. The semi-finals were refereed by Alexander McKibbin, the final by August Silber. Top scorer was Oskar Üpraus from Sport with 4 goals. VS Sport Tallinn defended their title and won 4–2 against ESS Kalev Tallinn.

== Semi-finals ==
Date	Team 1	Score	Team 2
Oct 10	VS Sport Tallinn	6–1	Tallinna Jalgpalliklubi
Oct 15	ESS Kalev Tallinn	2–0	KS Võitleja Narva

== Final ==
Date	Team 1	Score	Team 2
Oct 29	VS Sport Tallinn	4–2	ESS Kalev Tallinn
