= 1938 Estonian Cup =

International football competition

Eesti Karikas

Tournament details
- Country: Estonia
- Teams: 11

Final positions
- Champions: VS Sport Tallinn
- Runners-up: Tallinna Jalgpalliklubi

Tournament statistics
- Matches played: 11
- Goals scored: 41 (3.73 per match)

The 1938 Estonian Cup (Estonian: Eesti Karikas) was the first season of the Estonian football knockout tournament. 11 teams took part of the competition. In that time there was no penalty shoot-out after extra time. Because of that another final had to be arranged as the first match ended 1–1. In the second match, played on 6 November in Kadriorg Stadium, VS Sport Tallinn narrowly won over Tallinna Jalgpalliklubi, thus becoming the first cup champions of Estonia.

== Preliminary round ==
Team 1	Score	Team 2
PK Olümpia Tartu	5–1	VVS Puhkekodu Tallinn
SS Kalev Pärnu	5–2 (a.e.t.)	ÜENÜTO
KS Võitleja Narva	3–4	Narva THK

== Quarter-finals ==
Team 1	Score	Team 2
SS Kalev Pärnu	0–1	VS Sport Tallinn
PK Olümpia Tartu	0–3	SS Tervis Pärnu
ESS Kalev Tallinn	2–3	Tallinna Jalgpalliklubi
Narva THK	0–1	SÜ Esta Tallinn

== Semi-finals ==
Team 1	Score	Team 2
VS Sport Tallinn	3–2	SS Tervis Pärnu
SÜ Esta Tallinn	0–1 (a.e.t.)	Tallinna Jalgpalliklubi

== Final ==
18 September 1938

VS Sport Tallinn	1–1 (a.e.t.)	Tallinna Jalgpalliklubi
Siimenson 8'		Velisto 55'

Kadrioru staadion, Tallinn
Referee: Henrich Paal

=== Replay ===
6 November 1938

VS Sport Tallinn	2–1 (a.e.t.)	Tallinna Jalgpalliklubi
Brenner 29'; Kleesmann 97'		Kastanja-Kastan 25'

Kadrioru staadion, Tallinn
Attendance: 1,000
Referee: Oskar Koni
