= 1921 Estonian Football Championship =

Estonian Championship
- Season: 1921
- Champions: VS Sport Tallinn (1st title)
- Matches: 4
- Goals: 20 (5 per match)
- Top goalscorer: Heinrich Paal (3)

The 1921 Estonian Football Championship was the first football league season in Estonia. It was played as a knock-out tournament between September 25 and October 13. Four teams took part in the competition – three from Tallinn and one from Narva. All the games were played at Tiigiveski Ground in Tallinn and refereed by Alexander McKibbin. Top scorer was Heinrich Paal with 3 goals, followed by Vladimir Tell and Oskar Üpraus with two. VS Sport Tallinn won 5–3 against Tallinna Jalgpalli Klubi and thus became the first ever champions of Estonia.

== Semi-finals ==
25 September 1921	Tallinna Jalgpalli Klubi	6 – 1	KS Võitleja Narva	Tallinn
				Stadium: Tiigiveski stadium Referee: Alexander McKibbin

2 October 1921	VS Sport Tallinn	1 – 1 ^{‡}	ESS Kalev Tallinn	Tallinn
	Arnold Kuulman 32' (pen.)		68' Artur Prunn	Stadium: Tiigiveski stadium Referee: Alexander McKibbin

^{‡} After normal time, the match was to be played until the first goal, but after 130 minutes and no goals it was abandoned due darkness.

=== Replay ===
9 October 1921	VS Sport Tallinn	3 – 0	ESS Kalev Tallinn	Tallinn
	Oskar Ürpaus 71'; Vladimir Tell 77'; Heinrich Paal ??'			Stadium: Tiigiveski stadium Referee: Alexander McKibbin

== Final ==
13 October 1921	VS Sport Tallinn	5 – 3	Tallinna Jalgpalli Klubi	Tallinn
	Heinrich Paal 10', 70'; Vladimir Tell 63'; Oskar Ürpaus ??' ?? ??'		16' Eduard Jõepere; 53' Raimond Põder; 72' Otto Silber	Stadium: Tiigiveski stadium Referee: Alexander McKibbin
