= 1932 Estonian Football Championship =

Estonian Championship
- Season: 1932
- Champions: VS Sport Tallinn (8th title)
- Relegated: KS Võitleja Narva
- Matches played: 30
- Goals scored: 118 (3.93 per match)
- Top goalscorer: Arnold Laasner (13)
- Biggest home win: Sport 7–0 Võitleja
- Biggest away win: Võitleja 0–4 Puhkekodu
- Highest scoring: Jalgpalliklubi 7–3 Võitleja

The 1932 Estonian Football Championship was the 12th official football league season in Estonia. Six teams, four from Tallinn and two from Narva, took part in the league. Each team played every opponent twice, one at home and once on the road, for total of 10 games. VS Sport Tallinn successfully defended their title, winning the league for the eight time in the club's history.

== League table ==
Pos	Team	Pld	W	D	L	GF	GA	GD	Pts
1	VS Sport Tallinn (C)	10	9	0	1	42	9	+33	18
2	VVS Puhkekodu Tallinn	10	6	1	3	18	17	+1	13
3	ESS Kalev Tallinn	10	5	1	4	16	15	+1	11
4	Tallinna Jalgpalliklubi	10	4	1	5	22	21	+1	9
5	Narva THK	10	3	1	6	14	21	−7	7
6	KS Võitleja Narva (R)	10	0	2	8	6	35	−29	2

(C) Champions; (R) Relegated

== Results ==
Home \ Away	KAL	NAR	PUK	TJK	VÕI	VSS
ESS Kalev		2–1	2–2	3–2	3–0	1–0
Narva THK	1–0		3–1	1–2	3–0	2–3
Puhkekodu	1–0	3–0		2–1	4–0	2–4
Tallinna JK	4–0	3–1	0–2		7–3	0–2
Võitleja	1–4	1–1	-:+ (Note: The match between Võitleja and Puhkekodu was settled with a goalless win for Puhkekodu.)	1–1		0–5
VS Sport	3–1	6–0	6–1	6–2	7–0	

Legend: Blue = home team win; Yellow = draw; Red = away team win.

== Top scorers ==
Pos	Name	Team	Goals
1	Arnold Laasner	VS Sport Tallinn	13
2	Friedrich Karm	VS Sport Tallinn	12
3	Osvald Kastanja-Kastan	Tallinna Jalgpalliklubi	8
3	Georg Siimenson	VS Sport Tallinn	8
