= 1933 Estonian Football Championship =

Estonian Championship
- Season: 1933
- Champions: VS Sport Tallinn (9th title)
- Relegated: KS Võitleja Narva
- Matches played: 30
- Goals scored: 126 (4.2 per match)
- Top goalscorer: Richard Valdov (14)
- Biggest home win: Estonia 5–0 THK
- Biggest away win: Kalev 0–9 Estonia
- Highest scoring: Kalev 0–9 Estonia

The 1933 Estonian Football Championship was the 13th official football league season in Estonia. Six teams took part in the league five from Tallinn and one from Narva. Each team played every opponent twice, one at home and once on the road, for total of 10 games. VS Sport Tallinn won their third consecutive title.

== League table ==
Pos	Team	Pld	W	D	L	GF	GA	GD	Pts
1	VS Sport Tallinn (C)	10	8	0	2	26	7	+19	16
2	JS Estonia Tallinn	10	7	1	2	35	10	+25	15
3	Tallinna Jalgpalliklubi	10	7	0	3	28	15	+13	14
4	ESS Kalev Tallinn	10	4	0	6	15	30	−15	8
5	VVS Puhkekodu Tallinn	10	2	1	7	12	27	−15	5
6	Narva THK (R)	10	1	0	9	10	37	−27	2

(C) Champions; (R) Relegated

== Results ==
Home \ Away	KAL	EST	NAR	PUK	TJK	VSS
ESS Kalev		1–0	6–3	1–0	2–4	0–3
Estonia	9–0		4–0	3–0	6–2	4–1
Narva THK	2–1	0–5		1–3	1–4	0–4
Puhkekodu	2–3	2–2	4–2		1–3	0–3
Tallinna JK	5–0	1–2	3–1	4–0		2–0
VS Sport	2–1	3–0	3–0	5–0	2–0	

Legend: Blue = home team win; Yellow = draw; Red = away team win.

== Top scorers ==
Pos	Name	Team	Gls
1	Richard Valdov	Tallinna Jalgpalliklubi	14
2	Heinrich Uukkivi	JS Estonia Tallinn	9
3	Osvald Kastanja-Kastan	Tallinna Jalgpalliklubi	6
3	Friedrich Karm	VS Sport Tallinn	6
3	Eduard Ellmann-Eelma	JS Estonia Tallinn	6
3	Anton Koovit	ESS Kalev Tallinn	6
