= 1939 Estonian Cup =

International football competition

Eesti Karikas

Tournament details
- Country: Estonia
- Teams: 11

Final positions
- Champions: Tallinna Jalgpalliklubi
- Runners-up: ESS Kalev Tallinn

Tournament statistics
- Matches played: 9
- Goals scored: 48 (5.33 per match)

The 1939 Estonian Cup (Estonian: Eesti Karikas) was the second season of the Estonian football knockout tournament. 11 teams took part of the competition. In the final, played on 30 August in Kadriorg Stadium in Tallinn, Tallinna Jalgpalliklubi won 4–1 over ESS Kalev Tallinn.

== Preliminary round ==
Team 1	Score	Team 2
SS Kalev Pärnu	w/o	VS Sport Tallinn
THK Narva	3–2	KS Võitleja Narva
SK Raudla Tartu	0–0 (a.e.t.)	SÜ Esta Tallinn
Replay
SÜ Esta Tallinn	w/o	SK Raudla Tartu

== Quarter-finals ==
Team 1	Score	Team 2
PK Olümpia Tartu	2–8	ESS Kalev Tallinn
Tallinna Jalgpalliklubi	6–5	VS Sport Tallinn
SS Tervis Pärnu	1–2	SÜ Esta Tallinn
THK Narva	3–2 (a.e.t.)	ÜENÜTO

== Semi-finals ==
Team 1	Score	Team 2
Tallinna Jalgpalliklubi	6–2	THK Narva
ESS Kalev Tallinn	1–0	SÜ Esta Tallinn

== Final ==
30 August 1939

Tallinna Jalgpalliklubi	4–1	ESS Kalev Tallinn
Papp 50'; Velisto 75'; Kastanja-Kastan 83'; Šmitt 86'		Veidemann 37'

Kadrioru staadion, Tallinn
Attendance: 1,200
Referee: Evald Tipner
