= Valter Biiber =

Estonian footballer

Personal information
- Date of birth: 31 August 1907
- Place of birth: Narva, Estonia
- Date of death: 8 September 1977 (aged 70)
- Place of death: Tallinn, then part of Estonian SSR, Soviet Union
- Position: Midfielder

Senior career*
Years	Team	Apps	(Gls)
1925–????	KS Võitleja Narva		
- Türi Spordiring
- VS Sport Tallinn
- Narva THK
- KS Võitleja Narva
- Türi Spordiring

International career
1930	Estonia	2	(0)
- * Club domestic league appearances and goals

Valter Biiber (31 August 1907 in Narva — 8 September 1977 in Tallinn) was an Estonian football player.

== Career ==
He played for KS Võitleja Narva, VS Sport Tallinn, Narva THK and Türi Spordiring. During his career he has made two appearances for the Estonian national team.

In 1930, he was Estonian Football Championship top scorer with 5 goals.
