= Wismari Stadium =

Football stadium in Tallinn, Estonia

Wismari staadion
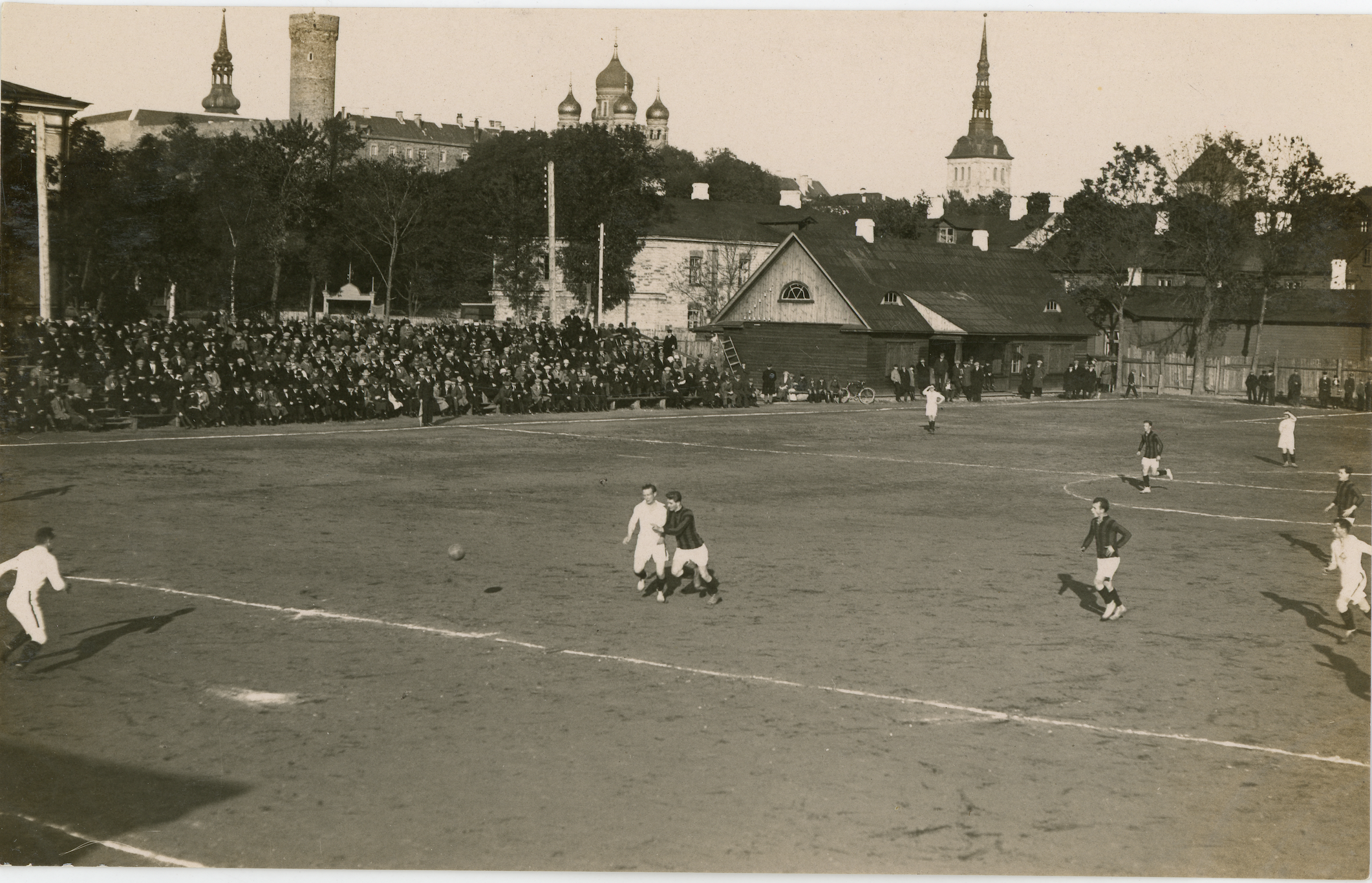
- Wismari Stadium in 1922
- Former names: VS Spordi väljak
- Location: Tallinn, Estonia
- Coordinates: 59°25′52.97″N 24°43′58.25″E
- Field size: 100 × 63 m
- Surface: Artificial turf

Construction
- Opened: 1916; 109 years ago
- Renovated: 2014

Tenants
- Tallinna Sport (1916–1944); TJK Legion / TJK (2001–present)

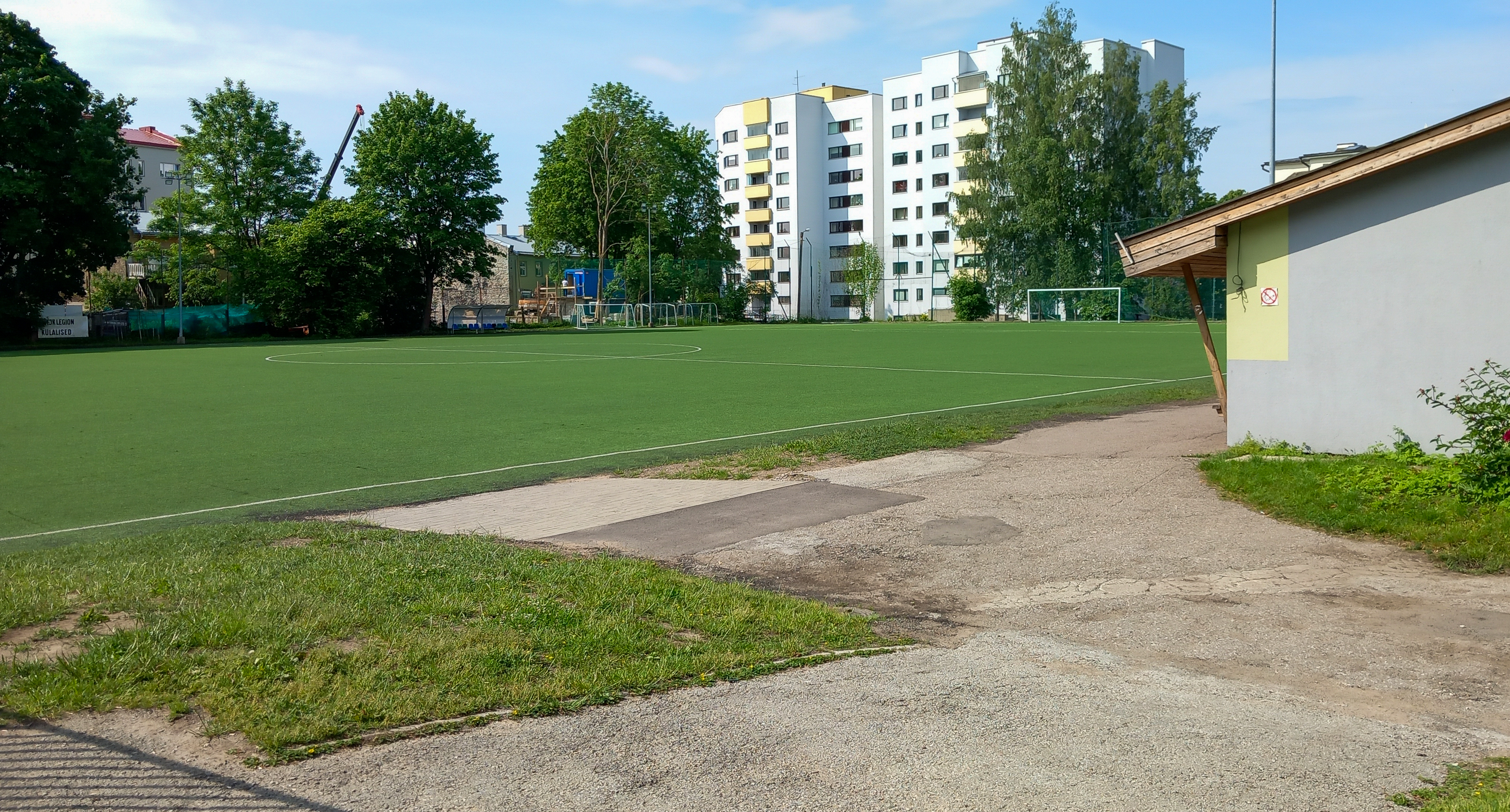
Wismari Stadium in 2025

Wismari Stadium is a football stadium in Tallinn, Estonia. Opened in 1916, it is the oldest existing football field in Tallinn. It currently serves as a training ground for TJK Legion. Wismari was the historic home ground of the nine-time Estonian champion Tallinna Sport during the first period of independence in Estonia.

The address of the stadium is Wismari 15a. The name of the Wismari street and stadium comes from the fortification that was located in the area at the end of the 17th century - the Wismari Ravelin.

== History ==
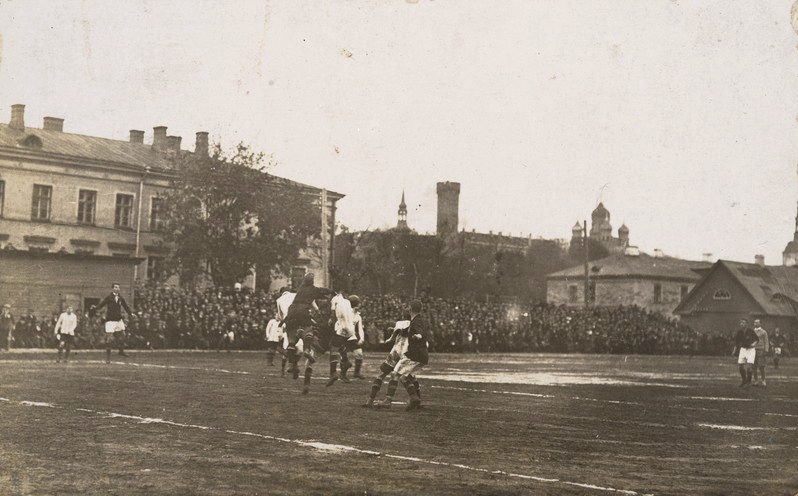
Wismari Stadium hosting the 1924 Estonian Football Championship final between Sport and Kalev

Wismari Stadium was opened in 1916 by Tallinna VS Sport, who rented the field from the nearby German "vaestekooli" school. Then known as Spordi väljak, the stadium was mainly used for football during the summer, and bandy during the winter.

On 1 October 1922, an exhibition match between the actors of the Estonia Theatre and the Estonian Drama Theatre was held in the stadium. The football match attracted 3000–4000 spectators and saw famous Estonia Theatre actors such as Paul Pinna, Alfred Sällik and many others win 2–1 against their next door neighbours Drama Theatre.

In 1923, the stadium hosted an international football match between Estonia and Finland, which was won 2–1 by Estonia. In 1932, the stadium was reconstructed as a velodrome, but the track was demolished three years later in 1935.

== Estonia national team matches ==
Wismari Stadium has hosted the Estonia national football team once in 1923, after a decision was made on the morning of the matchday to move the fixture away from the national team's usual home ground Kalevi Aed, due to the field of the latter being too 'muddy'.

Date		Result	Competition	Attendance
30 September 1923	Estonia – Finland	2–1	Friendly	4,000
