= Eduard Jõepere =

Estonian footballer

International career
Years	Team	Apps	(Gls)
1929	Estonia	1	(0)

Eduard Jõepere (? – 16 December 1941) was an Estonian professional footballer who played as a forward for the Estonian national football team.

== Career ==
Jõepere debuted for the Estonian national team in 1921 in a match against Finland.
