= 1929 Estonian Football Championship =

Estonian Championship
- Season: 1929
- Champions: VS Sport Tallinn (6th title)
- Relegated: SK Estika Tallinn; VK Merkur Tallinn; Tartu Jalgpalli Klubi
- Matches: 15
- Goals: 57 (3.8 per match)
- Top goalscorer: Friedrich Karm (7)
- Highest scoring: Tallinna JK 6–1 Tartu JK

The 1929 Estonian Football Championship was the 9th official football league season in Estonia. Six teams, five from Tallinn and one from Tartu, took part in the league. VS Sport Tallinn won their sixth title.

== League table ==
Pos	Team	Pld	W	D	L	GF	GA	GD	Pts	VSS	TJK	KAL	EST	MER	TAR
1	VS Sport Tallinn (C)	5	5	0	0	15	1	+14	10		1–0	2–0	4–1	5–0	3–0
2	Tallinna Jalgpalliklubi	5	3	1	1	14	7	+7	7			3–2	2–2	3–1	6–1
3	ESS Kalev Tallinn	5	2	1	2	9	9	0	5				3–3	4–1	+:-
4	SK Estika Tallinn (R)	5	0	3	2	8	13	−5	3					1–3	1–1
5	VK Merkur Tallinn (R)	5	1	1	3	7	15	−8	3						2–2
6	Tartu Jalgpalliklubi (R)	5	0	2	3	4	12	−8	2						

(C) Champions; (R) Relegated

== Top scorers ==
Pos	Name	Team	Goals
1	Friedrich Karm	VS Sport Tallinn	7
2	Arnold Pihlak	Tallinna Jalgpalliklubi	5
3	Ernst Joll	Tallinna Jalgpalliklubi	4
3	Artur Maurer	ESS Kalev Tallinn	4
