= 1931 Estonian Football Championship =

Estonian Championship
- Season: 1931
- Champions: Sport (7th title)
- Matches played: 15
- Goals scored: 55 (3.67 per match)
- Top goalscorer: Friedrich Karm (8)
- Biggest home win: Puhkekodu 7–0 THK
- Biggest away win: Võitleja 1–4 Tallina JK; Narva THK 0–3 Kalev
- Highest scoring: Sport 6–1 Võitleja; Puhkekodu 7–0 THK

1931 Estonian Football Championship was the 11th official football league season in Estonia. Six teams, four from Tallinn and two from Narva, took part in the league. VS Sport Tallinn won their seventh title.

== League table ==
Pos	Team	Pld	W	D	L	GF	GA	GD	Pts
1	VS Sport Tallinn (C)	5	4	1	0	14	2	+12	9
2	ESS Kalev Tallinn	5	3	1	1	9	2	+7	7
3	Tallinna Jalgpalliklubi	5	3	1	1	9	5	+4	7
4	VVS Puhkekodu Tallinn	5	1	1	3	10	10	0	3
5	KS Võitleja Narva	5	1	0	4	9	18	−9	2
6	Narva THK (R)	5	1	0	4	4	18	−14	2

(C) Champions; (R) Relegated

== Results ==
Home \ Away	VSS	KAL	TJK	PUK	VÕI	NAR
VS Sport		0–0	3–0	3–1	6–1	2–0
ESS Kalev			0–1	2–1	4–0	3–0
Tallinna JK				0–0	4–1	4–1
Puhkekodu					1–5	7–0
Võitleja						2–3
Narva THK						

== Top scorers ==
Pos	Name	Team	Gls
1	Friedrich Karm	VS Sport Tallinn	8
3	Osvald Kastanja-Kastan	KS Võitleja Narva	4
3	Oskar Vinkelberg-Loo	VVS Puhkekodu Tallinn	4
3	Anton Koovit	ESS Kalev Tallinn	4
