= 1927 Estonian Football Championship =

1927 Estonian Championship
Final positions
- Champions: VS Sport Tallinn (5th title)

The 1927 Estonian Football Championship was the seventh top-division football league season in Estonia. Nine teams, seven from Tallinn and one from Pärnu took part in the league. It was played as a knock-out tournament. VS Sport Tallinn won the championship.

== Quarter-finals ==
Date	Team 1	Score	Team 2
	VS Sport Tallinn	16–0	JK Tervis Pärnu
	Võitleja Tallinn	4–1	Nõmme SS Kalju
	ESS Kalev Tallinn	9–0	Merkur Tallinn
	Tallinna Jalgpalliklubi	7–2	Meteor Tallinn

== Semi-finals ==
Date	Team 1	Score	Team 2
	Tallinna Jalgpalliklubi	4–1	ESS Kalev Tallinn
	VS Sport Tallinn	4–1	Võitleja Tallinn

== Final ==
Date	Team 1	Score	Team 2
	VS Sport Tallinn	2–0	Tallinna Jalgpalliklubi

== Top Goalscorers ==
- Karl-Richard Idlane (VS Sport Tallinn) - 6 goals
- Aleksander Gerassimov (VS Sport Tallinn) - 6 goals
