= 1929 Baltic Cup =

International football competition

Tournament details
- Host country: Latvia
- Dates: 14–16 August
- Teams: (from UEFA confederations) (from BFA sub-confederations)
- Venue: 1 (in 1 host city)

Final positions
- Champions: Estonia (1st title)
- Runners-up: Latvia
- Third place: Lithuania

Tournament statistics
- Matches played: 3
- Goals scored: 15 (5 per match)
- Attendance: 8,000 (2,667 per match)
- Top scorer(s): (Estonia) Eduard Ellman-Eelma (Estonia) Eugen Einman (Latvia) Voldemārs Plade (3 goals)

The 1929 Baltic Cup was held in Riga, Latvia at LSB Stadions on 14–16 August 1929. It was the second time three Baltic countries — Estonia, Latvia and Lithuania — came together to play a friendly tournament and determine the best team amongst them. Estonia won the tournament on goal difference.

== Results ==
Team	Pld	W	D	L	GF	GA	GD	Pts
Estonia	2	1	1	0	7	4	+3	3
Latvia	2	1	1	0	5	3	+2	3
Lithuania	2	0	0	2	3	8	–5	0

14 August 1929

Latvia	3 – 1	Lithuania
Plade 51', 68', 86'	Report	89' (pen.) Chmelevskis

LSB Stadions, Riga
Attendance: 2,000
Referee: Peco Bauwens (Germany)
15 August 1929

Estonia	5 – 2	Lithuania
Einman 16', 59'; Arnold Pihlak 32'; Ellman-Eelma 75', 85'	Report	26' Chmelevskis; 35' Rutkauskas

LSB Stadions, Riga
Referee: Peco Bauwens (Germany)
16 August 1929

Latvia	2 – 2	Estonia
Priede 27'; Pavlovs 63'	Report	9' Einman; 29' Ellman-Eelma

LSB Stadions, Riga
Attendance: 4,000
Referee: Peco Bauwens (Germany)

1929 Baltic Cup winner

Estonia
First title

== Statistics ==
=== Goalscorers ===
There were 15 goals scored in 3 matches, for an average of 5 goals per match.

3 goals

- (Estonia) Eduard Ellman-Eelma
- (Estonia) Eugen Einman
- (Latvia) Voldemārs Plade

2 goals

- (Lithuania) Stepas Chmelevskis

1 goal

- (Estonia) Arnold Pihlak
- (Latvia) Aleksandrs Priede
- (Latvia) Arkādijs Pavlovs
- (Lithuania) Ricardas Rutkauskas
