= Arnold Laasner =

Estonian footballer (1906–1964)

- Laasner in 1932

Personal information
- Date of birth: 14 June 1906
- Place of birth: Reval, Governorate of Estonia
- Date of death: 29 January 1964 (aged 57)
- Place of death: Gloucester, United Kingdom
- Position: Midfielder

Senior career*
Years	Team	Apps	(Gls)
	SK Tallinna Sport (1925–1943)		(54)

International career
1930–1936	Estonia	27	(2)
- * Club domestic league appearances and goals

Arnold Laasner (27 June 1906 – 29 January 1964) was an Estonian footballer and basketball player.

He was born in Tallinn. A midfielder, he began his football career at the age of 14 in Nõmme. In 1925 he joined SK Tallinna Sport. He became the Estonian champion in 1925, 1929 and 1931–33. He won the silver medal in 1926, 1927, 1930, 1934, 1936 and 1943, and won the bronze medal in 1939. In 1932, he scored the most goals (fourteen) in Meistriliiga and scored 54 goals in the championship during his career.

He also played ice hockey, volleyball and especially basketball, winning a silver medal for the Estonian championships in 1927. He played also one match for Estonia men's national basketball team.

Following the Soviet re-occupation and annexation of Estonia at the end of World War II, he fled to Germany. Later, he moved to United Kingdom. He died in Gloucester in 1964.
