= SK Tallinna Sport =

Association football club in Estonia

Sport
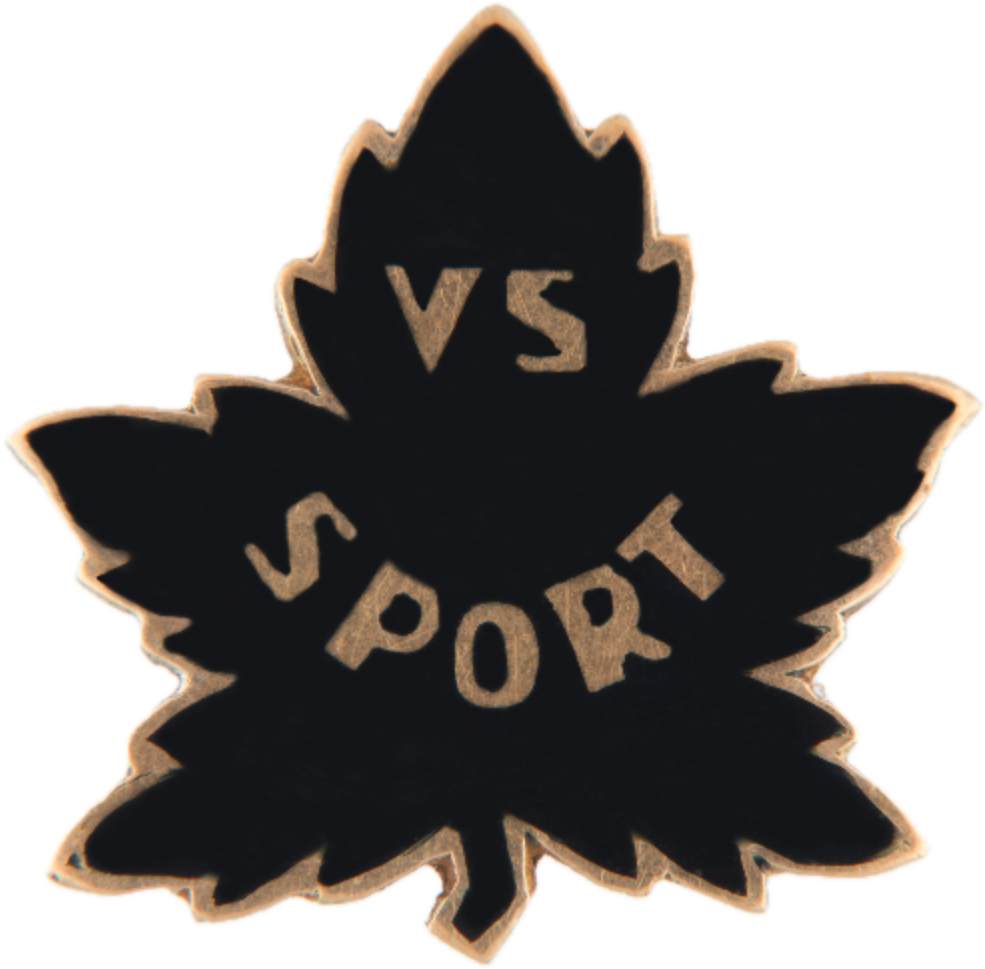
- Full name: Tallinna Võimlemise Selts Sport
- Nickname(s): Sini-valged (Blue-whites)
- Founded: 2 June 1912; 113 years ago
- Dissolved: 1944; 2008
- Ground: Wismari Stadium
- League: III liiga Põhi
- 2007: 1st
Home colours

SK Tallinna Sport, or simply Sport, is a defunct Estonian football club based in Tallinn. Founded in 1912, Sport won nine domestic league titles and was the most successful Estonian football club before Soviet occupation.

Sport was the founding member and the first champion of both the Estonian Football Championship and the Estonian Cup. Before World War II, the club was also active in athletics, weightlifting, wrestling, boxing, speed skating, basketball, volleyball and bandy. Sport was the first-ever Estonian champion in basketball and volleyball, and an 11-time Estonian champion in bandy. From 1920 to 1936, members of VS Sport won a total of 11 medals at the Olympic Games, including gold medals by Kristjan Palusalu and Voldemar Väli.

The club was closed down in 1944 due to the Soviet occupation of Estonia. Sport's name briefly reappeared in football in the late 1980s and again in 2003. At last, Tallinna Sport played in the northern division of III liiga. The club finished 1st in 2007, but was dissolved after the beginning of the year 2008.

== History ==
=== Early years (1912–1920) ===
Sport was founded on 2 June 1912 as Tallinna Võimlemise Selts Sport (English: Tallinn Gymnastics Association "Sport") by sports enthusiasts, who saw a need for a new sports club in Tallinn, as the only well-functioning club Kalev had an image of being an organisation for mostly affluent people.

The newly formed sport organisation developed quickly, and was already very active in Tallinn's sports life by the summer of 1913. Tallinna Sport's first international football match took place on 4 May 1914 against Helsinki IFK. The game ended in a 4–4 draw. In the following years, Sport continued to play football matches against Finnish teams and thus grew close ties with Finland. These ties lead to Sport appointing Finnish international Verner Eklöf as their coach in 1921.

=== First Estonian champions & continuous domestic success (1921–1929) ===
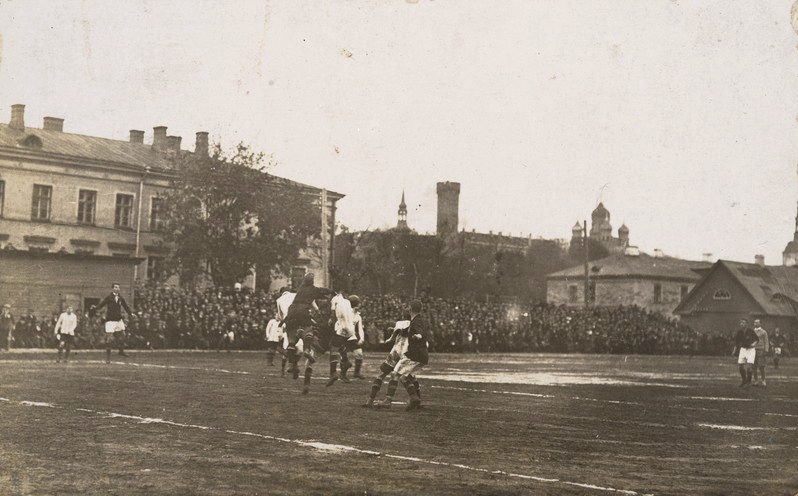
Sport and Kalev were the fiercest rivals in Estonian sports during the country's first period of independence

The first Estonian Football Championship took place in 1921 and was played as a knock-out tournament. Sport faced Tallinna Kalev in the semi-final and drew 1–1. After normal time, the match was to be played until the first goal, but after 130 minutes and no goals it was abandoned due darkness. The replay saw Sport win Kalev 3–0 after which they faced TJK in the final. Sport won the match 5–3 and were crowned the Estonian champions. Sport retained the title in the following year, beating Tallinna Kalev 4–2 in the final.

By the third season, Sport and Kalev had grown into fierce rivals. By the fate of the draw, Sport faced Kalev in the semi-final. The highly anticipated match took place at Kalev's new stadium and with tickets sold out, 5,000 spectators witnessed Kalev triumph against Sport 1–0. Kalev went on to win the 1923 Championship.

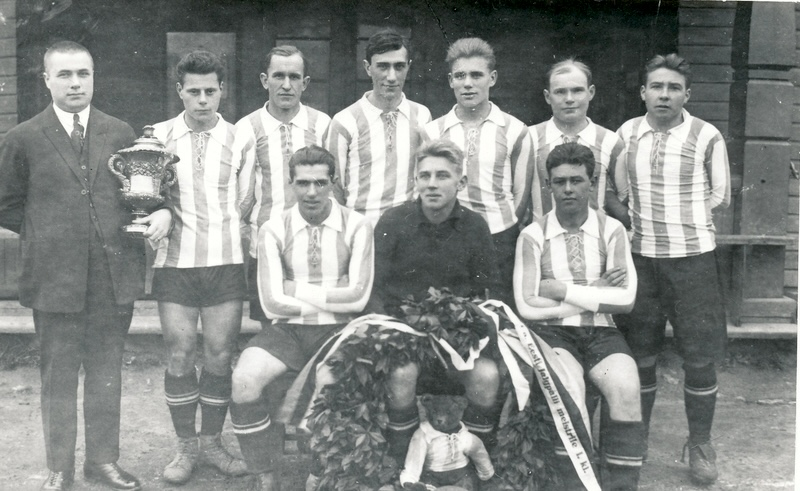
Sport with the 1924 league title

The following two seasons saw Sport Tallinn dominate in the Estonian Championship, again beating rivals Kalev in a 4-match final in 1924 and 5–0 in the final of 1925. After losing to TJK in the 1926 Championship final, Sport appointed Hungarian Antal Mally as their coach and defeated TJK in the 1927 final, thus winning their 5th title in their seventh season. After a conflict with the Estonian FA, Sport along with a number of other teams decided not to take part in the 1928 season, but returned in the following year, when the championship was played in a league system format for the first time. Sport won all five games with a goal difference of 15-1 and were crowned the Estonian champions of 1929.

=== International success & dissolution (1930–1944) ===
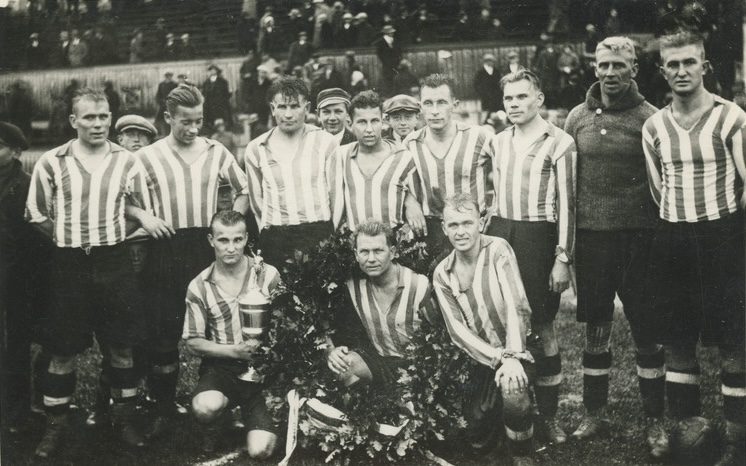
Sport with the 1932 league title

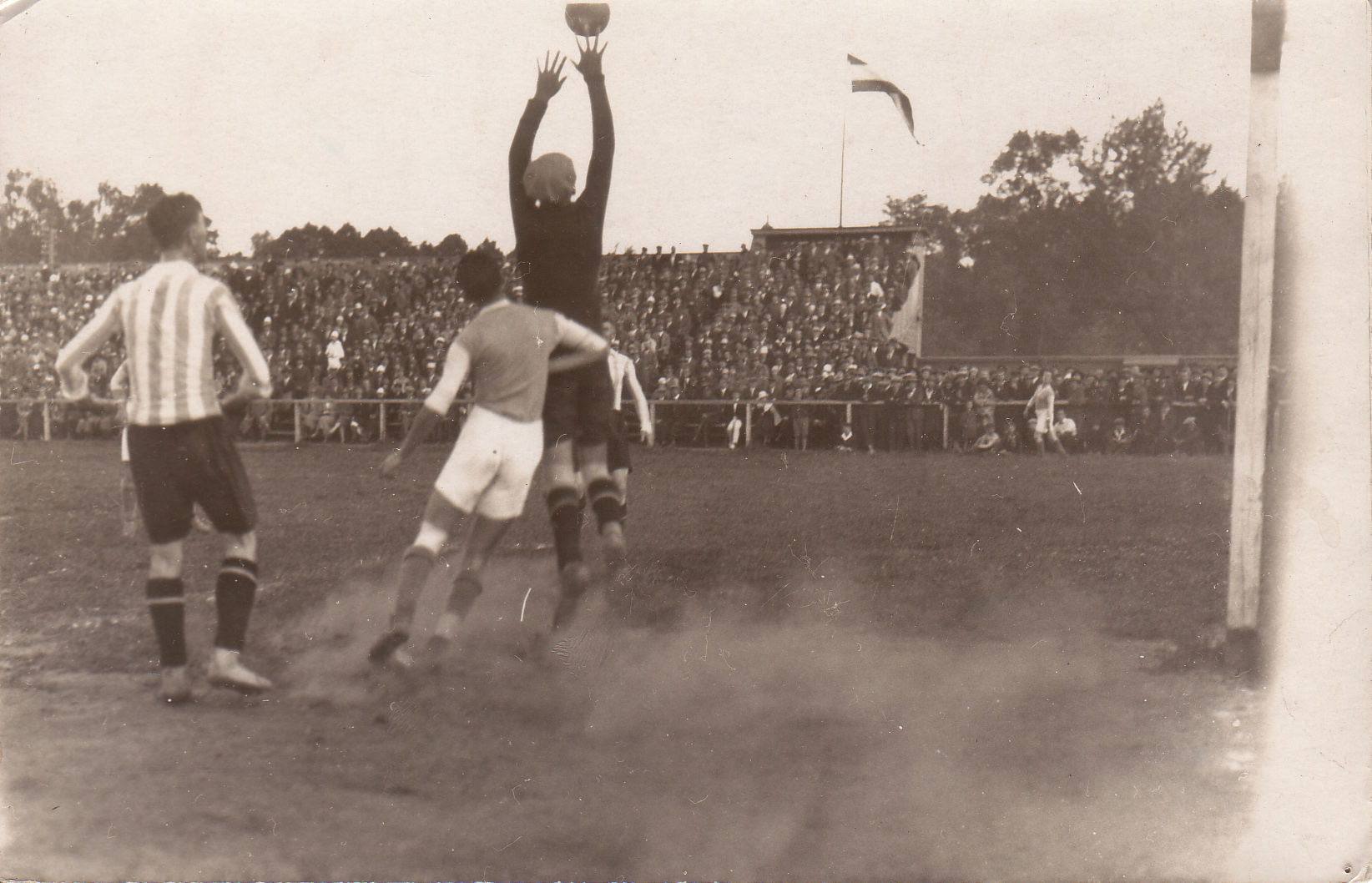
Evald Tipner in action for Sport against Hakoah Vienna

The 1930 season saw Sport lose the Championship title to Kalev, but the club returned to the throne in 1931, finishing the season unbeaten. Tallinna Sport retained the title in 1932 and 1933, where they finished one point clear of the newly promoted JS Estonia Tallinn. That 1933 Championship title proved to be the last for Sport, as the following seasons were dominated by JS Estonia. Sport continued to be one of the top teams in Estonia, but were unable to win the title again before the Soviet occupation of Estonia put an end to the Estonian Football Championship in 1941.

The 1930s saw Sport also face several top European clubs, who visited Estonia during their European tours. After losing 2–3 to Austria Vienna and their star player Matthias Sindelar in 1930, Tallinna Sport faced Barcelona CE Europa, who were the founding members of La Liga the year before. Sport drew 1–1 with the Spanish top division team. Sport also won Berlin FC Preussen 3–0 in 1931 and defeated Austrian club WAC, the finalist of the same year's Mitropa Cup (considered as one of the predecessors to the Champions League), 3–1. That match is best remembered for the heroic performance of the Sport's legendary goalkeeper Evald Tipner.

In 1938, by Sport's initiative, the Estonian Cup competition was created, which Sport won by beating TJK in the final. The newspapers evaluated the actions of Evald Tipner again as the basis of Sport's victory.

The club was dissolved in 1941 after the Soviet Union occupied Estonia, but was re-established a year later during the German occupation and won the unofficial 1942 Estonian Cup. Tallinna Sport was closed down in 1944 after Soviet Union retook Estonia.

=== Tallinna Sport in Soviet football (1985–1989) ===
Tallinna Sport's name reappeared in football in 1985. Named Tallinna FK Sport, the club took part in the Soviet Second League and finished eighth in the 1985 and 1988 seasons. The club was a stepping stone for numerous later Estonian internationals, such as Mart Poom, Marek Lemsalu, Martin Reim and Marko Kristal, as well as later Russian international and national team head coach Valery Karpin. Sport finished 20th out of 22 teams in the 1989 season and ceased its activities after that. Two years later, Estonia regained its independence.

In 2003, a group of people attempted to re-establish Tallinna Sport and entered the fifth tier of Estonian football. However, this initiative did not last long and the team was dissolved in 2008.

== Managerial history ==
Dates	Name
1921–1926	(Finland) Verner Eklöf
1927 & 1935	(Hungary) Antal Mally
1930s	(Estonia) Heinrich Paal

== Honours ==
=== League ===
- Estonian Championship
  - Winners (9): 1921, 1922, 1924, 1925, 1927, 1929, 1931, 1932, 1933

=== Cup ===
- Estonian Cup
  - Winners (1): 1938

== Seasons and statistics ==
Season	Division	Pos	Pld	W	D	L	Pts	Top goalscorer	Estonian Cup
1921	Top Division	1	Won the final 5–3 vs TJK					(Estonia) Heinrich Paal (3)	
1922	Top Division	1	Won the final 4–2 vs Kalev					(Estonia) Oskar Üpraus (4)	
1923	Top Division	3	Lost the semi-final 0–1 vs Kalev					N/A	
1924	Top Division	1	Won in a 4-match final vs Kalev					(Estonia) Oskar Üpraus (6)	
1925	Top Division	1	Won the final 5–0 vs Kalev					(Estonia) Aleksander Gerassimov-Kalvet (4)	
1926	Top Division	2	Lost the final 1–4 vs TJK					(Estonia) Aleksander Gerassimov-Kalvet (Estonia) Voldemar Birkenthal (1)	
1927	Top Division	1	Won the final 2–0 vs TJK					(Estonia) Aleksander Gerassimov-Kalvet (Estonia) Karl-Richard Idlane (6)	
1928	Top Division	Did not take part due to a conflict with the Estonian FA							
1929	Top Division	1	5	5	0	0	10	(Estonia) Friedrich Karm (7)	
1930	Top Division	2	3	2	1	0	5	(Estonia) Valter Biiber (5)	
1931	Top Division	1	5	4	1	0	9	(Estonia) Friedrich Karm (8)	
1932	Top Division	1	10	9	0	1	18	(Estonia) Arnold Laasner (13)	
1933	Top Division	1	10	8	0	2	16	(Estonia) Friedrich Karm (6)	
1934	Top Division	2	10	7	1	2	15	(Estonia) Karl-Richard Idlane (8)	
1935	Top Division	4	7	3	2	2	8		
1936	Top Division	2	14	7	4	3	18	(Estonia) Elmar Valdmees (12)	
1937–38	Top Division	4	14	8	1	5	17	(Estonia) Georg Siimenson (Estonia) Arnold Laasner (10)	
1938–39	Top Division	3	14	7	1	6	15		Winners
1939–40	Top Division	4	14	5	4	5	14	(Estonia) Hugo Ööbik (8)	Quarter-finals
Estonia was occupied by Soviet Union in 1940, Sport was dissolved in 1944 and re-established in 2003
2003	IV liiga E	10	18	1	0	17	3		
2004	V liiga E	5	14	6	1	7	19		
2005	IV liiga E	4	22	13	1	8	40		
2006	III liiga E	8	22	7	3	12	24		
2007	III liiga N	1	22	17	3	2	54		
