= Karl-Richard Idlane =

Estonian footballer

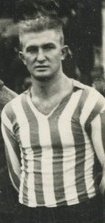
- Idlane in 1932

Personal information
- Date of birth: 18 January 1910
- Place of birth: Kaarma, Kreis Ösel, Governorate of Livonia
- Date of death: 12 January 1942 (aged 31)
- Height: 1.92 m (6 ft 4 in)
- Position: Midfielder

International career
Years	Team	Apps	(Gls)
1929	Estonia	31	(2)

Karl-Richard Idlane (18 January 1910 – 12 January 1942) was an Estonian professional footballer who played as a midfielder for the Estonian national football team.
