= 1928 Estonian Football Championship =

1928 Estonian Championship
Final positions
- Champions: Tallinna Jalgpalliklubi (2nd title)

The 1928 Estonian Football Championship was the eight top-division football league season in Estonia. It was played as a knock-out tournament. Tallinna Jalgpalliklubi won the championship.

== Round 1 ==
=== Tallinn ===
Date	Team 1	Score	Team 2
	Quarter-finals		
	ÜENÜTO	1–2	ÜMNÜ Hõimla
	NMKÜTO	2–1	Edu Tallinn
	Tallinna VVS Puhkekodu	13–0	tekas^{?} Tallinn
	Äriteenijad Tallinn	3–1	vitjas^{?} Tallinn
	Semi-finals		
	ÜMNÜ Hõimla	5–0	NMKÜTO
	Tallinna VVS Puhkekodu	1–2	Äriteenijad Tallinn
	Final		
	ÜMNÜ Hõimla	3–1	Äriteenijad Tallinn

=== Northern-Estonia ===
Date	Team 1	Score	Team 2
	Final		
	Rakvere Kalev	3–1	NK Astra Narva

=== Southern-Estonia ===
Tartu Jalgpalliklubi

=== Western-Estonia ===
Date	Team 1	Score	Team 2
	Final		
	Kohila Püsivus	1–2	Jõelähtme Ühendus

=== Central-Estonia ===
Date	Team 1	Score	Team 2
	Quarter-finals		
	Pärnu Jalgpalliklubi	4–5	SS Tervis Pärnu
	SS Sindi Kalju	bye	
	Semi-finals		
	Türi Spordiring	8–1	Võhma Leola
	SS Sindi Kalju	2–2	SS Tervis Pärnu
Replay	SS Sindi Kalju	w/o	SS Tervis Pärnu
	Final		
	Türi Spordiring	3–0	SS Sindi Kalju

=== Regional-final ===
Date	Team 1	Score	Team 2
	Preliminary round		
	Jõelähtme Ühendus	2–5	Türi Spordiring
	Semi-finals		
	ÜMNÜ Hõimla	1–5	Tartu Jalgpalliklubi
	Türi Spordiring	4–2	Rakvere Kalev
	Final		
	Tartu Jalgpalliklubi	1–0	Türi Spordiring

== Round 3 ==
Date	Team 1	Score	Team 2
	Tallinna Võitleja	2–1	KS Võitleja Narva
	Tallinna Võitleja	4–2	JK Tervis Pärnu
	Tallinna Võitleja	0–3	Tartu Jalgpalliklubi

== Final ==
Date	Team 1	Score	Team 2
	Tallinna Jalgpalliklubi	4–1	VK Merkur Tallinn

== Top goalscorer ==
- Eduard Ellman-Eelma (Tallinna Jalgpalli Klubi) – 2 goals
