= 1925 Estonian Football Championship =

1925 Estonian Championship
Final positions
- Champions: VS Sport Tallinn (4th title)

The 1925 Estonian Football Championship was the fifth top-division football league season in Estonia, organized by the Estonian Football Association. It was played as a knock-out tournament. VS Sport Tallinn won the championship.

== Play-offs ==
Teams are eliminated after two losses. Play-offs are played until two teams are left.

Date	Team 1	Score	Team 2	Teams left
	KS Võitleja Narva	5–1	JK Pärnu Tervis (withdrew)	5 teams
	VS Sport Tallinn	1–1 (a.e.t.)	Nõmme SS Kalju	5 teams
	Kalevipoeg Tallinn	1–0 (a.e.t.)	KS Võitleja Narva (1st loss)	5 teams
	VS Sport Tallinn	1–1 (a.e.t.)	ESS Kalev Tallinn	5 teams
	KS Võitleja Narva	3–3 (a.e.t.)	Kalevipoeg Tallinn	5 teams
	VS Sport Tallinn	1–0	ESS Kalev Tallinn (1st loss)	5 teams
	ESS Kalev Tallinn	2–1	Kalevipoeg Tallinn (1st loss)	5 teams
	VS Sport Tallinn	0–0	Kalevipoeg Tallinn	5 teams
	VS Sport Tallinn	5–1	Kalevipoeg Tallinn (eliminated)	4 teams
	VS Sport Tallinn	2–1	Nõmme SS Kalju (1st loss)	4 teams
	KS Võitleja Narva	3–1 (a.e.t.)	Nõmme SS Kalju (eliminated)	3 teams
	ESS Kalev Tallinn	3–0	KS Võitleja Narva (eliminated)	2 teams

== Final ==
Date	Home team	Score	Away team
Sept 17	VS Sport Tallinn	5–0	ESS Kalev Tallinn

== Top goalscorer ==
- Aleksander Gerassimov (VS Sport Tallinn) – 4 goals
