= Arnold Pihlak =

Estonian footballer (1902–1985)

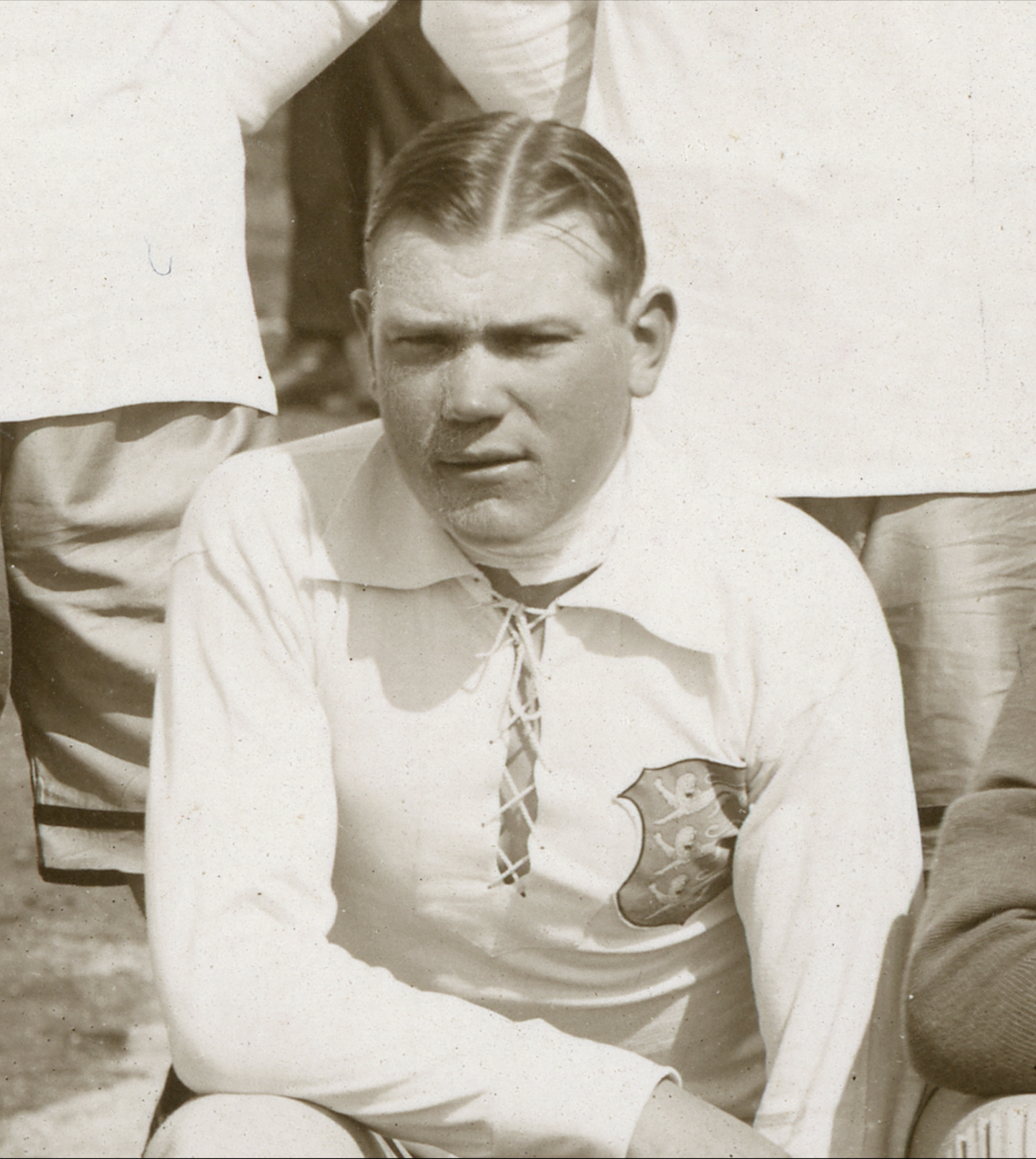

Personal information
- Date of birth: 17 July 1902
- Place of birth: Tallinn, Governorate of Estonia, Russian Empire
- Date of death: 1 November 1985 (aged 83)
- Place of death: Bradford, England

Senior career*
Years	Team	Apps	(Gls)
1920–1925	Kalev		
1924	Sport		
1925–1928	TJK		
1928–1929	Austria Wien		
1930–1934	JS Estonia Tallinn		

International career
1920–1931	Estonia	44	(16)
- * Club domestic league appearances and goals

Arnold Pihlak (17 July 1902 – 1 November 1985) was an Estonian footballer. After joining Austria Vienna in 1928, he became the first-ever Estonian professional footballer.

== Club career ==
Pihlak began playing football as a school pupil in Pelgulinn, but his studies and sporting aspirations were interrupted by his voluntary participation in the Estonian War of Independence, where he served on the armoured train No. 2.

After the war, Pihlak was invited to play for Tallinna Kalev. He was initially a defender, until his attacking talent was discovered by coach Antal Mally. Pihlak made a strong impression during the 1927 FIFA Helsinki tournament and in the April of the following year, while playing for TJK in Riga, he was approached by Karl Kurz with a proposal to join Austria Wien.

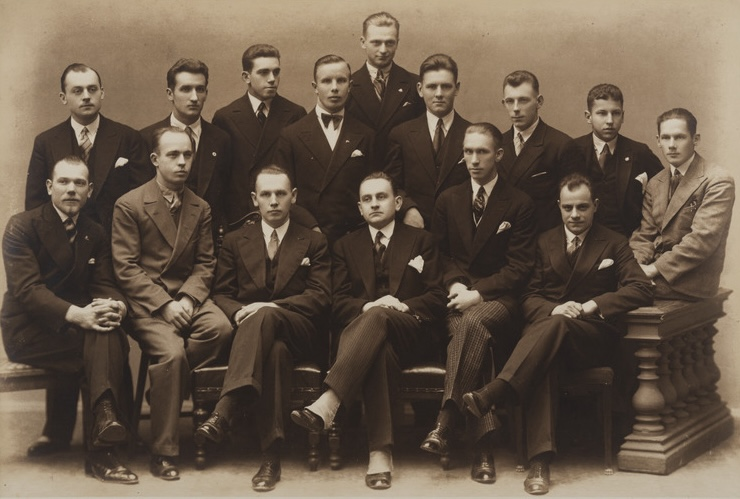
Arnold Pihlak (first in the front row) was one of the founders of JS Estonia

Pihlak made his unofficial debut for Austria Wien in December 1928 during their tour in Italy. Pihlak impressed on his official first team debut, scoring two goals in the club's 3–0 victory in the Austrian Cup match against SC Westmark Wien on 20 January 1929.

In 1930, Pihlak became one of the founding members of JS Estonia Tallinn. He retired from football in 1934, after he had been injured in a car accident the previous year, when his truck was hit by an oncoming train at an Ülemiste intersection.

== International career ==
Pihlak made his debut for Estonia national football team at 18 years old, when he was part of the country's first-ever national team match on 17 October 1920 against Finland. He also participated in the 1924 Summer Olympics in Paris. In total, Pihlak made 44 appearances for the national team and scored 16 goals. He was Estonia's third highest goalscorer during the country's first period of independence.
