= Aleksander Gerassimov-Kalvet =

Estonian footballer

Personal information
- Date of birth: 11 February 1904
- Date of death: 13 March 1970 (aged 66)
- Position: Forward

International career
Years	Team	Apps	(Gls)
1924	Estonia	1	(1)

Aleksander Gerassimov-Kalvet (11 February 1904 – 13 March 1970) was an Estonian professional footballer who played as a forward for the Estonia national football team.

== Career ==
Gerassimov-Kalvet played for Tallinna Sport where he finished two-times as a top scorer in the Estonian championship. He was registered in the list of players for Estonia during the Olympic Games of 1924. However, he was one of the six reserve players who remained in the country, thus, not playing a game for the Olympics. He was selected to play for Estonia on 18 July 1930, in a friendly match against Sweden, during which he scored a goal.
