= 1924 Estonian Football Championship =

1924 Estonian Championship
Final positions
- Champions: VS Sport Tallinn (3rd title)

The 1924 Estonian Football Championship was the fourth top-division football league season in Estonia, organized by the Estonian Football Association. It was played as a knock-out tournament. VS Sport Tallinn won the championship for the third time in four years.

== Preliminary matches ==
=== Round 1 ===
Date	Team 1	Score	Team 2
Aug 28	ESS Kalev Tallinn	3–2	Tallinna Jalgpalliklubi
Aug 31	VS Sport Tallinn	6–0	KS Võitleja Narva

=== Round 2 ===
Date	Team 1	Score	Team 2
Sep 10	VS Sport Tallinn	3–0	Tallinna Jalgpalliklubi

== Final ==
Champion was decided in a play-off series, played until first team reaches two wins.

Date	Home team	Score	Away team
Sept 17	VS Sport Tallinn	1–0	ESS Kalev Tallinn
Oct 12	ESS Kalev Tallinn	3–1	VS Sport Tallinn
Oct 26	ESS Kalev Tallinn	1–1	VS Sport Tallinn
Nov 2	VS Sport Tallinn	2–0	ESS Kalev Tallinn

== Top goalscorer ==
- Oskar Üpraus (VS Sport Tallinn) – 6 goals
