= Oskar Üpraus =

Estonian multi-sport athlete (born 1898)

Personal information
- Date of birth: 12 October 1898
- Place of birth: Kegel, Kreis Harrien, Governorate of Estonia, Russian Empire
- Date of death: 5 August 1968 (aged 69)
- Place of death: Tallinn, then part of Estonian SSR, Soviet Union

International career
Years	Team	Apps	(Gls)
1920–1927	Estonia	26	(7)

Oskar Üpraus (12 October 1898 – 5 August 1968) was an Estonian multi-sport athlete. He competed in association footballthe men's tournament at the 1924 Summer Olympics.

Besides football, he also skated and played bandy and baseball.
