= Friedrich Karm =

Estonian footballer (1907–1980)

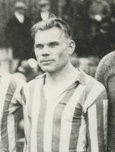
- Karm in 1932

Personal information
- Date of birth: 21 January 1907
- Place of birth: Reval, Governorate of Estonia, Russian Empire
- Date of death: 3 October 1980 (aged 73)
- Place of death: Tallinn, then part of Estonian SSR, Soviet Union

International career
Years	Team	Apps	(Gls)
1930–1933	Estonia	13	(9)

Friedrich Karm (21 January [O.S. 8 January] 1907 – 3 October 1980) was an Estonian international footballer who played as a forward and scored 9 goals in 13 games for the Estonia national team. He was also a bandy player.
