= Tallinna JK =

Association football club in Estonia

Tallinna Jalgpalli Klubi
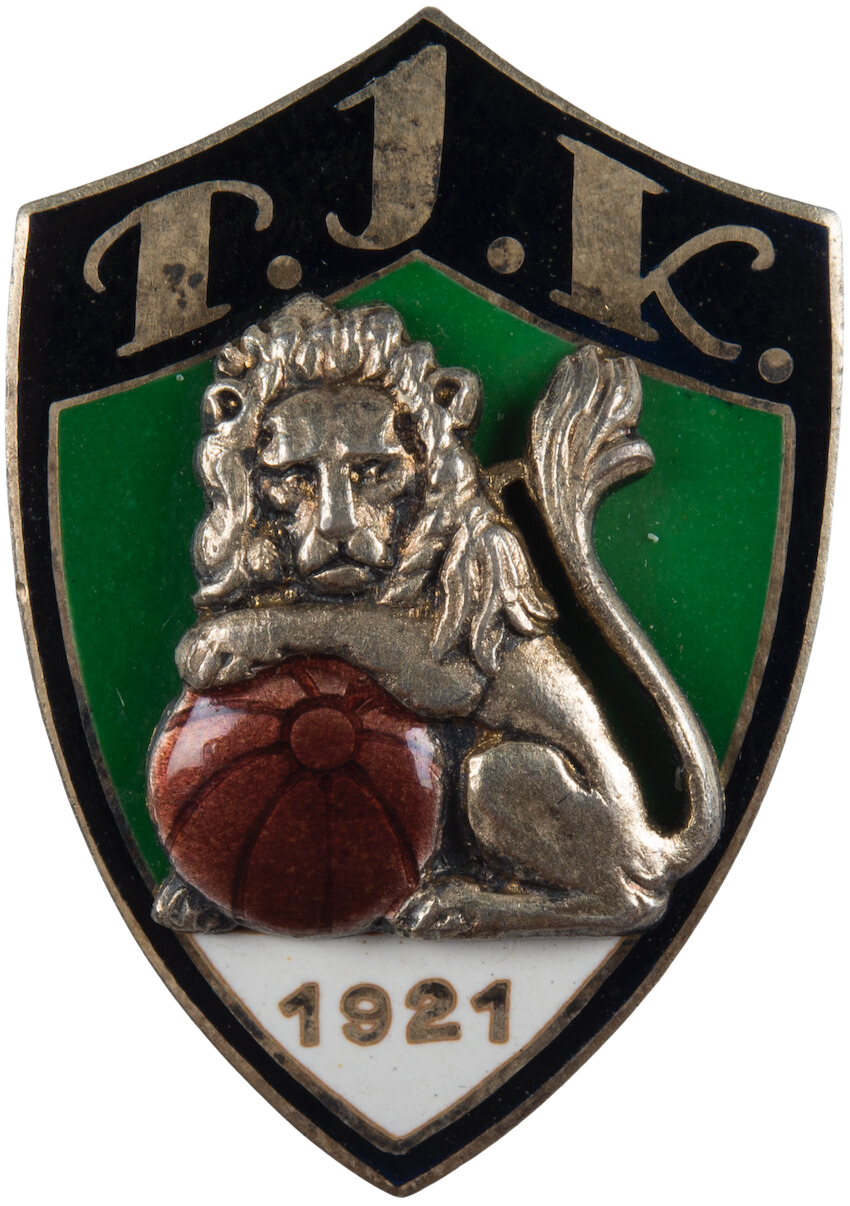
- Full name: Tallinna Jalgpalli Klubi
- Short name: TJK
- Founded: 5 May 1921; 104 years ago Re-established in 1992
- Dissolved: 1941; 2008 (merged into TJK Legion)
- Ground: TJK jalgpalliväli
- Capacity: 3,740
- League: II Liiga Ida/Põhi
- 2007: II liiga Ida/Põhi, 7th
Home colours	Away colours

Tallinna Jalgpalli Klubi, commonly referred to as simply TJK, is a defunct Estonian football club, based in Tallinn. Founded in 1921, TJK were one of the founding members of the Estonian Football Championship in 1921. On 4 January 2008, the club merged with SK Legion Tallinn and became TJK Legion.

TJK were crowned the Estonian champions twice, winning the Estonian Football Championship in 1926 and 1928. The club also lifted the Estonian Cup in 1939 and unofficially in 1940.

== History ==
=== Pioneers in Estonian football (1921–1941) ===
Tallinna Jalgpalli Klubi was founded on 5 May 1921 by Estonian footballers, who had returned from World War I and Estonian War of Independence and had lost their spot in their former clubs Kalev or Sport. Coached by Olympic silver medalist in the marathon Jüri Lossmann, the club took part in the first Estonian Football Championship in 1921, where they finished runners-up to VS Sport.

In many ways, TJK were the pioneers in Estonian football. They became the first Estonian sports club to solely focus on football and have it also mentioned in their name. Following the appointment of Hungarian Ferenc Woggenhuber in 1922, TJK became the first football club in Estonia to have a foreign coach. In August 1925, the club also opened the first modern football stadium in Estonia. Furthermore, TJK members Johannes Ellip and August Siiber wrote the first statute of the Estonian Football Association.

Tallinna Jalgpalli Klubi won the Estonian Football Championship in the 1926 season, where they beat Kalev 6–0 in the semi-final and defeated the reigning champions Sport 4–1 in the final. TJK were crowned champions again in 1928. At the end of the same year, TJK player Arnold Pihlak joined FK Austria Vienna and became the first professional Estonian footballer.

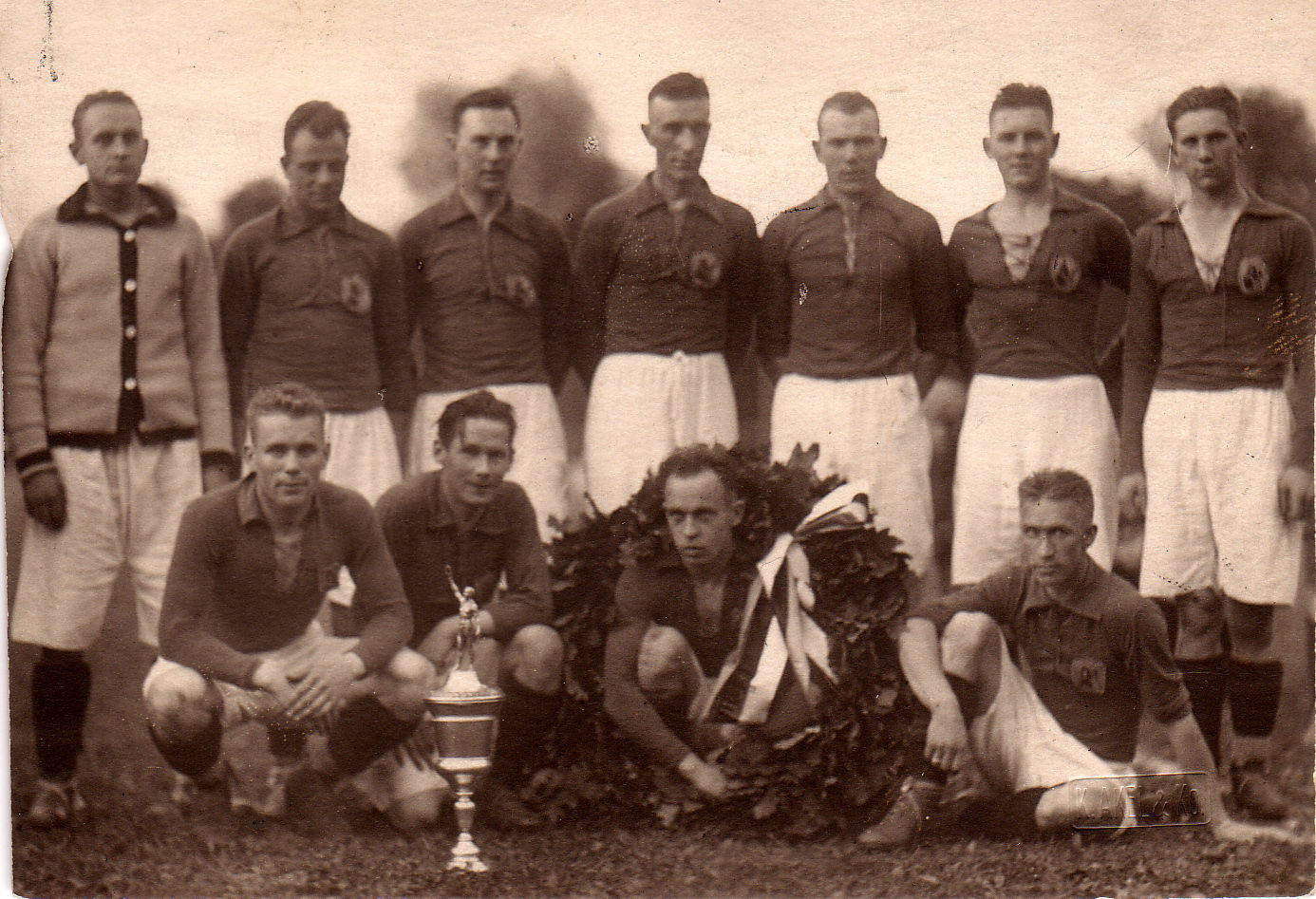
TJK players with the 1928 Estonian Football Championship title

TJK lifted the Estonian Cup in 1939 by beating Kalev 4–1 in the final. The club also won the cup final in the following year, but the competition was deemed unofficial due to World War II. TJK was disbanded in 1941 after Estonia had been occupied by the Soviets.

=== Rebirth and merger into TJK Legion (1992–2008) ===
Tallinna Jalgpalli Klubi was brought back to existence in January 1992, less than five months after Estonia had restored its independence. The club quickly became renowned for its successful youth system and was the starting point for famous Estonian internationals Konstantin Vassiljev, Tarmo Kink and Dmitri Kruglov. In 2008, Tallinna Jalgpalli Klubi and SK Legion merged and the club was named Tallinna Jalgpalli Klubi Legion. After a triumphant 2019 Esiliiga season, TJK Legion were promoted to Premium Liiga, marking the return of the TJK name, after its 80-year absence, to the Estonian top flight. The club competed in Premium Liiga for three seasons, from 2020 until 2022.

== Crest and colours ==
After its founding in 1921, TJK played their first season in white collared shirts and black shorts, but soon, the club affiliated themselves with the colour green. One possible theory for the origin of the traditional green club colours is that it was chosen to symbolise the green grass of their stadium, as TJK's home ground was the first football stadium in Estonia to have a natural grass surface.

TJK's crest was created by Estonian artist Jungberg and featured a lion, an animal which is also depicted on the coat of arms of Estonia. After TJK was re-established in the 1990s, the club began playing in blue shirts.

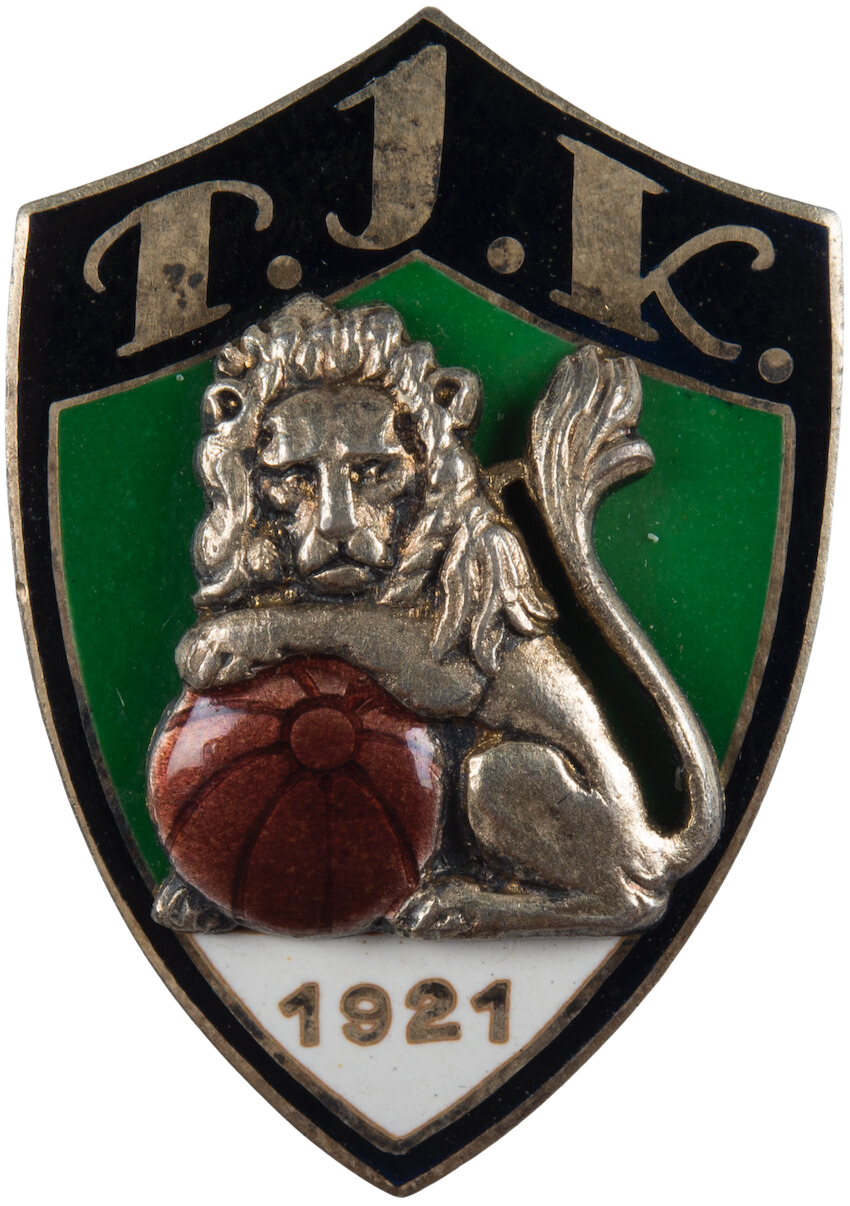
1921–1941

1992–2007

== Stadium ==
=== TJK jalgpalliväli ===
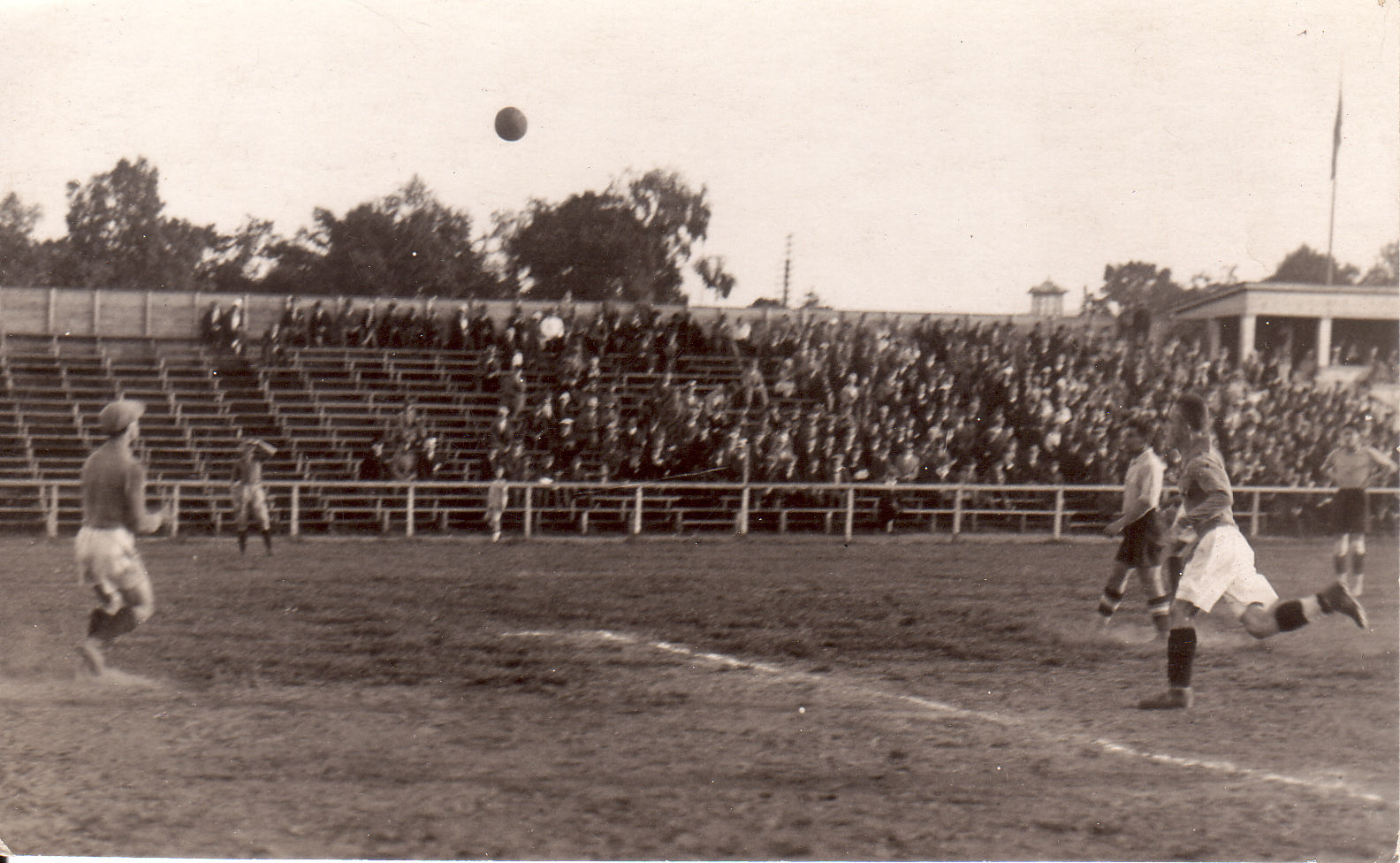
TJK Stadium in 1926, hosting the club's international match against Hungarian club Budapest Vívó

After being founded in 1921, TJK actively began looking for a site to construct their own football ground. Four years later, in August 1925, the club opened TJK Stadium, which became the first football stadium in Estonia to have a natural grass surface. The stadium's wooden grandstand could seat 3,740 people and with its additional standing capacity of 6,000, the football ground was able to facilitate nearly 10,000 spectators, making it the largest stadium in the country upon completion. The stadium was destroyed in the Second World War.

=== Wismari staadion ===
After the club was re-established in 1992, TJK started to operate at the Wismari Stadium. Opened in 1916, Wismari was once the home ground of TJK's arch-rivals Tallinna Sport.

== Achievements ==
=== League ===
- Estonian Championship
  - Winners (2): 1926, 1928

=== Cups ===
- Estonian Cup
  - Winners (1): 1939, 1940 (unofficial)

== Managerial history ==
Dates	Name
1921	(Estonia) Jüri Lossmann
1922	(Hungary) Franz Woggenhuber
1923–1926	(Germany) Willi Knesebeck

== Notable former players ==
- Eduard Ellman-Eelma – the former Estonia international footballer
- Otto Silber – Estonia international
- Voldemar Peterson – Estonia international
- Dmitri Kruglov – Estonia international
- Konstantin Vassiljev – Estonia international
- Tarmo Kink – Estonia international

== Seasons and statistics ==
Season	Division	Pos	Pld	W	D	L	Pts	Top goalscorer	Estonian Cup
1921	Top Division	2	Lost the final 3–5 vs Sport						
1922	Top Division	3-4	Lost the semi-final 1–6 vs Sport						
1923	Top Division	Did not take part due to a conflict with the Estonian FA							
1924	Top Division	3	Lost in round two 0–3 vs Sport						
1925	Top Division	Did not take part							
1926	Top Division	1	Won the final 4–1 vs Sport					(Estonia) Eduard Ellman-Eelma (Estonia) Arnold Pihlak (6)	
1927	Top Division	2	Lost the final 0–2 vs Sport					(Estonia) Eduard Ellman-Eelma (4)	
1928	Top Division	1	Won the final 4–1 vs Merkuur					(Estonia) Eduard Ellman-Eelma (2)	
1929	Top Division	2	5	3	1	1	7	(Estonia) Arnold Pihlak (5)	
1930	Top Division	3	3	1	0	2	2		
1931	Top Division	3	5	3	1	1	7		
1932	Top Division	4	10	4	1	5	9	(Estonia) Osvald Kastanja-Kastan (8)	
1933	Top Division	3	10	7	0	3	14	(Estonia) Osvald Kastanja-Kastan (6)	
1934	Top Division	4	10	4	3	3	11	(Estonia) Richard Kuremaa (6)	
1935	Top Division	3	7	3	2	2	8	(Estonia) Richard Kuremaa (6)	
1936	Top Division	7	14	4	1	9	9		
1937	B Division	4	3	0	0	3	0		
1938	B Division	1	3	2	0	1	4		
1938–39	Top Division	2	14	7	3	4	17	(Estonia) Osvald Kastanja-Kastan (13)	Runners-up
1939–40	Top Division	6	14	5	2	7	12	(Estonia) Albert Leichner (Estonia) Richard Kägu (7)	Winners
Estonia was occupied by Soviet Union in 1940, TJK was dissolved in 1941 and re-established in 1992
2002	Esiliiga	6	28	10	4	14	34	(Estonia) Konstantin Vassiljev (10)	
2003	Esiliiga	5	28	7	10	11	31	(Estonia) Juri Volkov (11)	
2004	Esiliiga	8	28	5	4	19	19	(Estonia) Aleksandr Ivanov (7)	
2005	Esiliiga	9	36	9	4	23	31	(Ukraine) Ruslan Vakulych (8)	
2006	II liiga N/W	8	28	1	3	24	6		
2007	II liiga N/W	7	26	11	7	8	40		
