= KS Võitleja Narva =

Estonian football club

Võitleja
- Full name: Karskusselts Võitleja Narva
- Founded: 1911
- Dissolved: 1941

KS Võitleja Narva (Temperance Society "Fighter" Narva) was an Estonian football club based in Narva. It was founded on 13 March 1911 as part of a local sports club of the same name.

Võitleja was one of the four teams that in 1921 participated in the first official Estonian football championship organised by the Estonian Football Association. It was played as a knock-out tournament, where in the semi-finals Võitleja lost to Tallinna Jalgpalli Klubi.

It was dissolved in 1941 because of World War II.

== Championship history ==
Season	League	Pos	Pld	W	D	L	GF	GA	GD	Pts	Top Goalscorer
1921	1	—	1	0	0	1	1	6	−5	—	N/A
1922	1	—	1	0	0	1	0	2	−2	—	—
1923	Did not participate										
1924	1	—	1	0	0	1	0	6	−6	—	—
1925	1	—	5	2	1	2	11	9	2	—	Alfons Elland (3)
1926	1	—	2	0	0	2	0	10	−10	—	—
1927	1	Disqualified for using an ineligible player									
1928	Did not participate										
1929	2	1	2	2	0	0	9	1	8	—	N/A
1930	1	4	3	0	0	3	2	23	−21	0	Osvald Kastanja-Kastan (2)
1931	1	5	5	1	0	4	9	18	−9	2	N/A
1932	1	6	10	0	2	8	6	35	−29	2	Felix Böckler-Aring (3)
1933	2	4	3	0	1	2	2	6	−4	1	N/A
1934	2	3	2	2	0	1	14	6	8	4	N/A
1935	1	7	7	2	0	5	10	15	−5	4	Valter Biiber (4)
1936	1	8	14	1	3	10	14	58	−44	5	Liblik (5)
1937	2	2	3	2	0	1	5	2	3	4	N/A
1938	2	3	3	1	1	1	4	4	0	3	N/A
1938–39	2	3	3	0	3	0	5	5	0	3	N/A
