= 1937–38 Estonian Football Championship =

Estonian Championship
- Season: 1937–38
- Champions: JS Estonia Tallinn
- Relegated: ÜENÜTO; VVS Puhkekodu Tallinn
- Matches: 56
- Goals: 277 (4.95 per match)
- Top goalscorer: Johannes Niks (17)
- Biggest home win: Estonia 14–1 Tervis
- Biggest away win: Puhkekodu 1–7 Kalev
- Highest scoring: Estonia 14–1 Tervis

The 1937–38 Estonian Football Championship was the 17th official football league season in Estonia. Eight teams took part in the league six from Tallinn, one from Pärnu and Narva. JS Estonia Tallinn finished first, its fourth consecutive league title.

== League table ==
Pos	Team	Pld	W	D	L	GF	GA	GD	Pts
1	JS Estonia Tallinn (C)	14	10	2	2	51	17	+34	22
2	SÜ Esta Tallinn	14	8	3	3	32	22	+10	19
3	ESS Kalev Tallinn	14	8	2	4	43	26	+17	18
4	VS Sport Tallinn	14	8	1	5	48	25	+23	17
5	Narva THK	14	4	3	7	30	44	−14	11
6	SS Tervis Pärnu	14	4	1	9	29	54	−25	9
7	ÜENÜTO (R)	14	4	0	10	26	50	−24	8
8	VVS Puhkekodu Tallinn (R)	14	3	2	9	18	39	−21	8

(C) Champions; (R) Relegated

== Results ==
Home \ Away	KAL	ETA	EST	NAR	PUH	TER	ÜEN	VSS
ESS Kalev		4–1	0–4	2–0	3–3	7–0	3–1	3–2
Esta	1–0		1–2	4–1	4–1	4–1	3–1	2–1
Estonia	2–0	2–2		1–1	2–0	14–1	7–2	5–0
Narva THK	2–2	2–2	2–4		5–1	3–2	5–3	4–1
Puhkekodu	1–7	0–1	2–0	3–0		1–4	3–0	0–5
Tervis	7–3	3–1	0–5	7–1	2–2		0–2	0–3
ÜENÜTO	1–7	2–4	2–3	4–2	4–0	2–0		0–7
VS Sport	1–2	2–2	4–0	8–2	2–1	6–2	6–2	

Legend: Blue = home team win; Yellow = draw; Red = away team win.

== Top scorers ==
Pos	Name	Team	Gls
1	Johannes Niks	JS Estonia Tallinn	17
2	Heinrich Uukkivi	JS Estonia Tallinn	12
2	Nikolai Kaubisch	Narva THK	12
4	Georg Siimenson	VS Sport Tallinn	10
4	Arnold Laasner	VS Sport Tallinn	10
4	Ralf Veidemann	ESS Kalev Tallinn	10
4	E. Kägu	ÜENÜTO	10
4	Alfred Kask	SS Tervis Pärnu	10
4	Nikolai Linberg	JS Estonia Tallinn	10
