= Richard Kuremaa =

Estonian footballer (1912–1991)

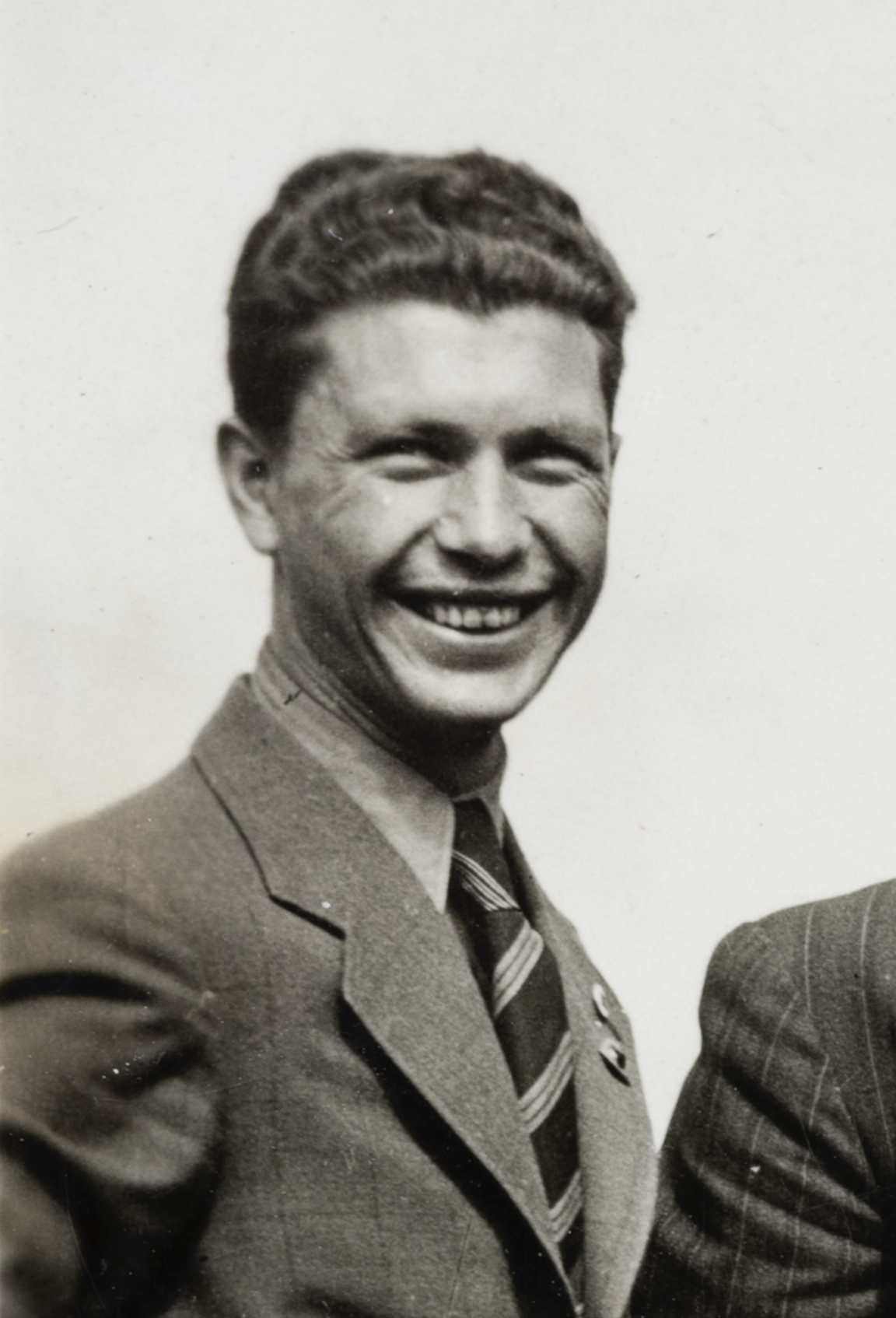
- Kuremaa in 1938

Personal information
- Full name: Richard Ferdinand Kuremaa
- Date of birth: 1 December 1912
- Place of birth: Reval, Governorate of Estonia, Russian Empire
- Date of death: 1 October 1991 (aged 78)
- Place of death: Tallinn, Estonia
- Height: 1.80 m (5 ft 11 in)
- Positions: Forward; second striker

Senior career*
| Years | Team | Apps | (Gls) |
| 1930 | Hermes Tallinn | ?? | (0) |
| 1931–1932 | Puhkekodu Tallinn | ?? | (1) |
| 1932 | Kalev | ?? | (3) |
| 1933–1935 | TJK | ?? | (16) |
| 1936 | Pärnu Tervis | ?? | (16) |
| 1937 | Tartu Olümpia | ?? | (??) |
| 1938 | JS Estonia Tallinn | ?? | (16) |
| 1939–1940 | Tartu Olümpia | ?? | (13) |

International career^{‡}
| 1933–1940 | Estonia | 42 | (19) |
- * Club domestic league appearances and goals as of 1 January 2009 ‡ National team caps and goals as of 1 January 2009

Richard Kuremaa (1 December 1912 – 1 October 1991) was an Estonian footballer – one of the most famous before World War II. He played 42 times for Estonia national football team, scoring 19 goals. Kuremaa was the Estonian top division's record goalscorer during the country's first period of independence.

After the Soviet Union occupied Estonia in 1940, Kuremaa was sent to hard labour and spent more than a decade in prison camps in Russia, before being released in 1952.

== Club career ==
Richard Kuremaa made a name for himself in football already during his school days and after graduating from Jakob Westholm Gymnasium in 1931, he received offers from a number of clubs. He first joined VVS Puhkekodu Tallinn, but moved to Kalev in the following year. In 1933, Kuremaa joined TJK, where he played for three seasons. After stints with Pärnu Tervis and Tartu Olümpia, Kuremaa joined JS Estonia Tallinn and lifted his first Estonian Top Division title in the 1937–38 season.

Kuremaa returned to Tartu and led the club to their first Estonian Championship title in the 1939–40 season. That proved to be the last season before World War II reached Estonia and the country was eventually occupied by the Soviet Union.

Although he never won the top scorer award, Kuremaa remained Estonian top division's record goalscorer until 1995 with 65 goals.

== International career ==
Richard Kuremaa made 42 appearances for Estonia national football team and scored 19 goals, making him Estonia's second highest goalscorer during the country's first period of independence. He debuted on 11 June 1933 against Sweden with a goal at the Olympiastadion. He also lifted the 1938 Baltic Cup with Estonia.

Kuremaa was the protagonist in Estonia's last official match before the country became a part of Soviet Union. The match took place on 18 July 1940 at the Kadriorg Stadium, where Estonia defeated Latvia 2–1, with Kuremaa scoring both of the goals. Considering the context surrounding the entire match, the fixture has been later interpreted as 'the last breath of free Estonia' due to being one of the very last public events where Estonians were able to express their nationality under the blue-black-white flag, before the Estonian SSR was nominally established three days later, on 21 July 1940.

== Life after football ==
In July 1941, 12 months after his last football match for the national team, Richard Kuremaa was sent to hard labour in Kotlas, Russia with fellow Estonian sportsmen Kristjan Palusalu, Gustav Sule and Aksel Kuuse among others. Kuremaa was sent to the front line in the following year and was captured by the Germans during the Battle of Velikiye Luki. He was imprisoned and allegedly sentenced to death, but according to a legend, recognised by the German soldiers, who remembered his impressive performance against Germany in Königsberg during the 1938 World Cup qualifiers, and thus spared him from the execution.

After a Soviet advance, Kuremaa was retained as a prisoner by the Soviet authorities, who subsequently sentenced him and his former teammates Heinrich Uukkivi and Elmar Tepp to death for treason. Kuremaa sent a pardon request to the Presidium of the Supreme Council of the Soviet Union and his sentence was changed to ten years of imprisonment. Kuremaa, Uukkivi and Tepp were sent to a prison camp in Kalinin, where Uukkivi and Tepp died in 1943. Kuremaa was released from the prison camp in 1952, after which the former footballer returned to Estonia, but was initially not allowed to live closer than 101 km to Tallinn.

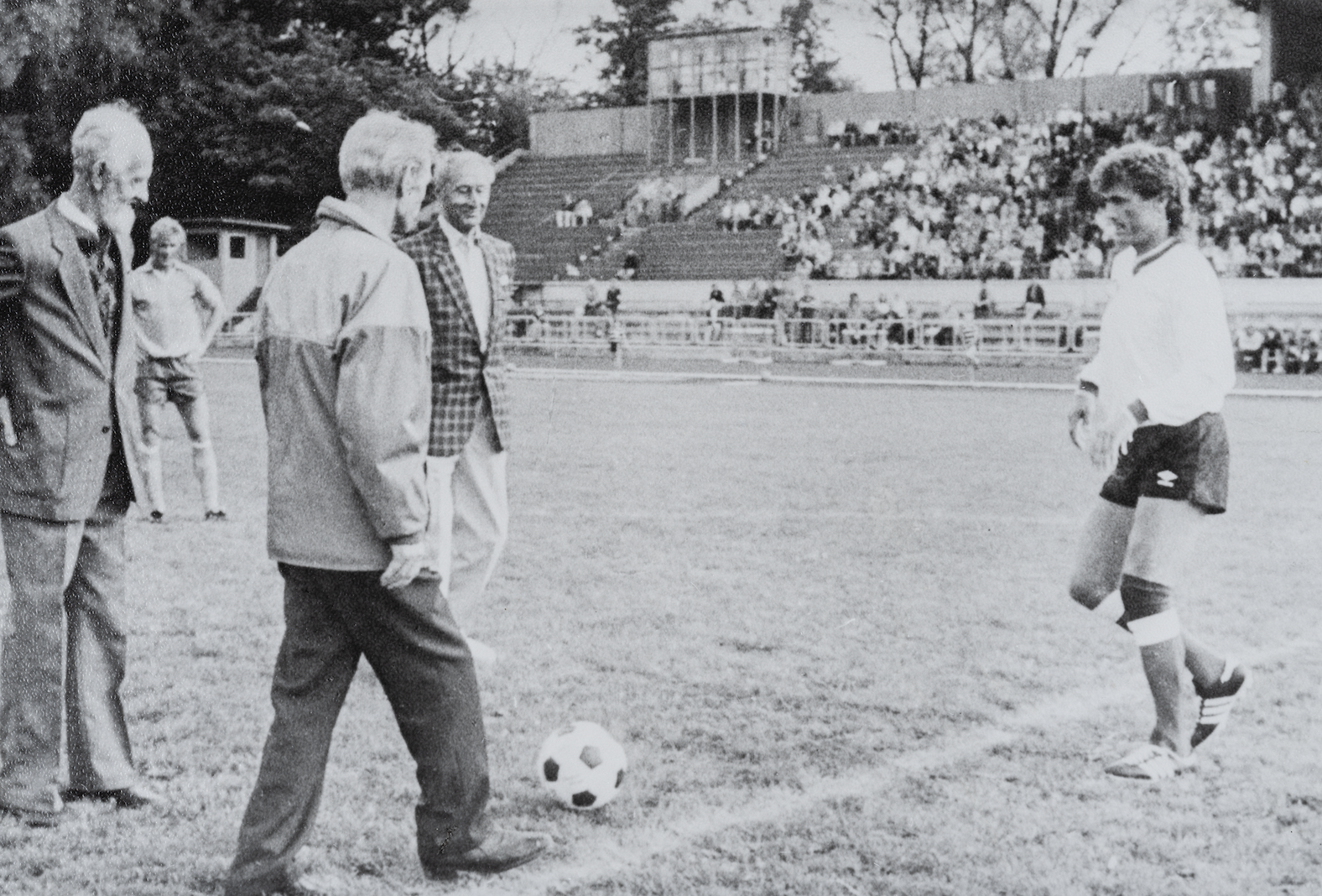
Richard Kuremaa with the ceremonial kick-off during the Estonia-Latvia commemorative match on 18 July 1990

Kuremaa was the guest of honour when Estonia faced Latvia in an unofficial match on 18 July 1990, where he took the ceremonial kick-off. The match was held to commemorate their last meeting exactly half a century earlier in 1940. Estonia regained its independence in the following year, on 20 August 1991. Richard Kuremaa died on 1 October 1991.

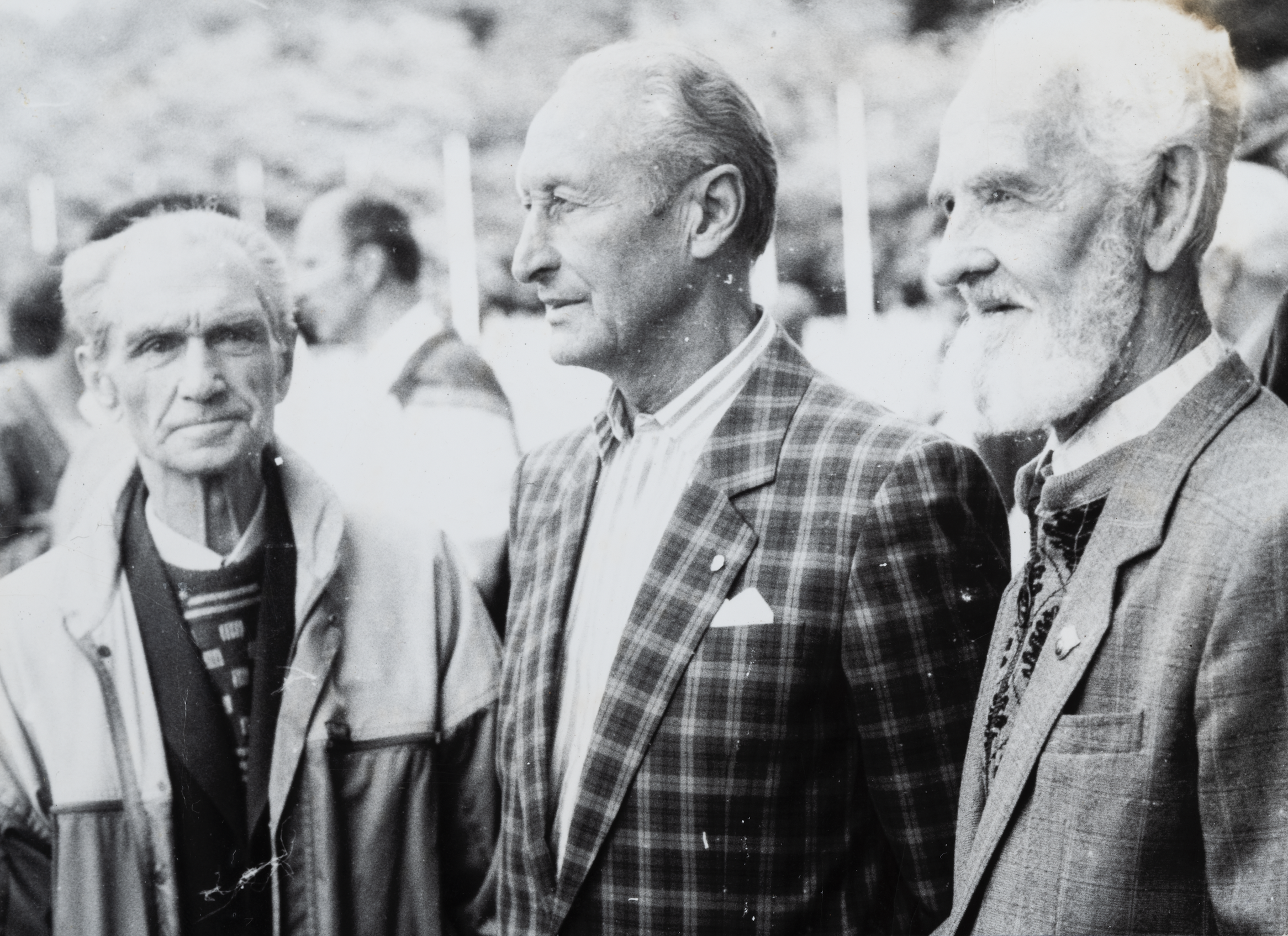
Richard Kuremaa (on the left) with Ralf Veidemann and Edmund Karp on 18 July 1990

== Club career statistics ==
| Club | Season | League | |
| Club | Season | Apps | Goals |
|---|---|---|---|
| Hermes Tallinn | 1930 | | 0 |
| Puhkekodu Tallinn | 1931 | | 0 |
| Puhkekodu Tallinn | 1932 | | 1 |
| Kalev | 1932 | | 3 |
| TJK | 1933 | | 4 |
| TJK | 1934 | | 6 |
| TJK | 1935 | | 6 |
| Pärnu Tervis | 1936 | | 16 |
| Tartu Olümpia | 1937–38 | | |
| JS Estonia | 1937–38 | | 8 |
| JS Estonia | 1938–39 | | 8 |
| Tartu Olümpia | 1938–39 | | 0 |
| Tartu Olümpia | 1939–40 | | 13 |
| Total | | | 65 |

== Honours ==
=== Club ===
==== JS Estonia Tallinn ====
- Estonian champion: 1937–38

==== Tartu Olümpia ====
- Estonian champion: 1939–40

=== International ===
==== Estonia ====
- Baltic Cup: 1938
