= 1939–40 Estonian Football Championship =

1939–40 Estonian Championship
Final positions
- Champions: Olümpia Tartu (1st title)

The 1939–40 Estonian Football Championship was the 19th official top-division football league season in Estonia, organized by the Estonian Football Association. It was the last season before World War II and the last official Estonian Football Championship season before Estonia was occupied by Soviet Union. The next Estonian Championship title was played out 52 years later in 1992, after the country had regained its independence.

PK Olümpia Tartu won the league and became the first club from outside of capital city Tallinn to lift the Estonian Football Championship title.

== League table ==
Pos	Team	Pld	W	D	L	GF	GA	GD	Pts
1	PK Olümpia Tartu (C)	14	9	4	1	39	14	+25	22
2	JS Estonia Tallinn	14	9	3	2	36	16	+20	21
3	SÜ Esta Tallinn	14	8	0	6	28	25	+3	16
4	VS Sport Tallinn	14	5	4	5	34	23	+11	14
5	ESS Kalev Tallinn	14	5	4	5	18	21	−3	14
6	Tallinna Jalgpalliklubi	14	5	2	7	26	32	−6	12
7	ÜENÜTO	14	3	2	9	22	38	−16	8
8	SS Kalev Pärnu (R)	14	1	3	10	18	52	−34	5

(C) Champions; (R) Relegated

== Results ==
Home \ Away	KAL	ETA	EST	PÄR	OLÜ	TJK	ÜEN	VSS
ESS Kalev		2–0	4–3	0–0	1–3	1–0	6–3	1–1
Esta	2–0		0–3	4–2	0–1	3–1	3–1	2–1
Estonia	3–0	2–1		4–3	0–0	2–1	3–1	0–0
Kalev Pärnu	1–1	1–5	1–6		0–2	1–4	0–0	3–2
Olümpia Tartu	3–1	6–1	1–1	5–0		6–1	5–2	0–3
Tallinna JK	2–0	3–4	1–3	5–2	2–2		1–1	0–3
ÜENÜTO	0–0	2–1	0–4	4–2	0–3	2–3		4–1
VS Sport	0–1	0–2	3–2	10–2	2–2	2–2	6–2	

Legend: Blue = home team win; Yellow = draw; Red = away team win.

== Top scorers ==
Pos	Name	Team	Goals
1	Nikolai Linberg	JS Estonia Tallinn	15
2	Richard Kuremaa	PK Olümpia Tartu	13
3	Boriss Riisik	PK Olümpia Tartu	9
4	Arnold Truks	ÜENÜTO	8
4	Hugo Ööbik	VS Sport Tallinn	8
6	Albert Leichner	Tallinna Jalgpalliklubi	7
6	Richard Kägu	Tallinna Jalgpalliklubi	7
6	Artur Kald	SÜ Esta Tallinn	7
