= Heinrich Uukkivi =

Estonian footballer, bandy player, and ice hockey player

Personal information
- Full name: Heinrich Uukkivi
- Date of birth: 10 May 1912
- Place of birth: Narva-Jõesuu, Governorate of Estonia, Russian Empire
- Date of death: 12 April 1943 (aged 30)
- Place of death: Krasnoyarsk Krai, Russian SFSR, Soviet Union
- Height: 1.75 m (5 ft 9 in)
- Position: Forward

Youth career
- 1928–1930: TJK

Senior career*
Years	Team	Apps	(Gls)
1931	TJK		
1932–1940	Estonia		
Total		?	(49)

International career
1931–1940	Estonia	46	(7)
- * Club domestic league appearances and goals

Heinrich Uukkivi (10 May 1912 – 12 April 1943) was an Estonian association football, bandy and ice hockey player. He won the Estonian Football Championship five times, the Estonian Bandy Championship three times and the Estonian Ice Hockey Championship twice.

Internationally, Uukkivi made 46 appearances for the Estonia national football team since his debut in 1931, and scored 7 goals. He won the 1931 and the 1938 Baltic Cup with the team. He also made three appearances for the Estonia national bandy team and three appearances for the Estonia men's national ice hockey team.

In 1940, after Soviet occupation, Uukkivi was forcibly drafted into the Soviet Army and subsequently captured by the invading German forces. Later, he was released by the Soviet Army and sentenced to a prison camp, where he died.

== Honours ==
=== Club ===
==== Football ====
Estonia

- Estonian Championship: 1934, 1935, 1936, 1937–38, 1938–39

==== Bandy ====
Kalev

- Estonian Championship: 1933, 1934

Dünamo

- Estonian Championship: 1941

==== Ice Hockey ====
Kalev

- Estonian Championship: 1933, 1937

=== Country ===
==== Football ====
Estonia

- Baltic Cup: 1931, 1938
