= 1936 Estonian Football Championship =

Estonian Championship
- Season: 1936
- Champions: JS Estonia Tallinn
- Relegated: Tallinna Jalgpalliklubi; KS Võitleja Narva
- Matches played: 56
- Goals scored: 248 (4.43 per match)
- Top goalscorer: Nikolai Linberg (21)
- Biggest home win: Estonia 12–1 Tervis
- Biggest away win: Võitleja 1–12 Estonia
- Highest scoring: Võitleja 1–12 Estonia

The 1936 Estonian Football Championship was the 16th official football league season in Estonia. Eight teams took part in the league six from Tallinn, one from Pärnu and Narva. Each team played every opponent twice, once at home and once on the road, for total of 14 games. JS Estonia Tallinn successfully defended the title and clinched their third consecutive league title.

== League table ==
Pos	Team	Pld	W	D	L	GF	GA	GD	Pts
1	JS Estonia Tallinn (C)	14	11	1	2	60	15	+45	23
2	VS Sport Tallinn	14	7	4	3	36	19	+17	18
3	VVS Puhkekodu Tallinn	14	7	3	4	34	21	+13	17
4	SS Tervis Pärnu	14	6	3	5	34	49	−15	15
5	ESS Kalev Tallinn	14	7	0	7	28	27	+1	14
6	SÜ Esta Tallinn	14	4	3	7	23	25	−2	11
7	Tallinna Jalgpalliklubi (R)	14	4	1	9	19	34	−15	9
8	KS Võitleja Narva (R)	14	1	3	10	14	58	−44	5

(C) Champions; (R) Relegated

== Results ==
Home \ Away	KAL	ETA	EST	PUH	TJK	TER	VÕI	VSS
ESS Kale		3–0	1–0	1–0	1–0	0–3	6–2	3–1
Esta	2–1		1–2	0–0	1–4	3–3	4–0	2–1
Estonia	4–3	1–0		5–1	4–2	12–1	7–1	1–3
Puhkekodu	3–2	5–2	0–3		3–2	6–0	5–0	0–0
Tallinna JK	3–4	0–5	0–2	0–1		0–3	1–0	3–2
Tervis	3–1	3–2	0–5	2–7	2–2		5–2	1–4
Võitleja Narva	2–1	0–0	1–13	2–2	0–2	2–5		0–0
VS Sport	4–1	2–1	1–1	2–1	6–0	3–3	7–2	

Legend: Blue = home team win; Yellow = draw; Red = away team win.

== Top scorers ==
Pos	Name	Team	Goals
1	Nikolai Linberg	JS Estonia Tallinn	21
2	Richard Kuremaa	SS Tervis Pärnu	16
3	Heinrich Uukkivi	JS Estonia Tallinn	14
4	Elmar Valdmees	VS Sport Tallinn	12
5	Johannes Niks	ESS Kalev Tallinn	11
6	Aavo Sillandi	JS Estonia Tallinn	10
7	Julius Kaljo	SÜ Esta Tallinn	9
7	Edgar Jürgens	JS Estonia Tallinn	9
