= 1938–39 Estonian Football Championship =

1938–39 Estonian Championship
Final positions
- Champions: Estonia Tallinn (5th title)

The 1938–39 Estonian Top Division was the 18th official football league season in Estonia. JS Estonia Tallinn won the title.

== League table ==
Pos	Team	Pld	W	D	L	GF	GA	GD	Pts
1	JS Estonia Tallinn (C)	14	11	1	2	40	11	+29	23
2	Tallinna Jalgpalliklubi	14	7	3	4	43	26	+17	17
3	VS Sport Tallinn	14	7	1	6	35	26	+9	15
4	SÜ Esta Tallinn	14	5	5	4	25	21	+4	15
5	ESS Kalev Tallinn	14	5	4	5	27	23	+4	14
6	PK Olümpia Tartu	14	7	0	7	22	36	−14	14
7	SS Tervis Pärnu (R)	14	4	1	9	21	42	−21	9
8	Narva THK (R)	14	2	1	11	18	46	−28	5

(C) Champions; (R) Relegated

== Results ==
Home \ Away	KAL	ETA	EST	NAR	OLÜ	TJK	TER	VSS
ESS Kalev		0–0	0–3	4–1	1–5	4–1	5–0	3–2
Esta	3–3		1–0	0–0	0–1	4–1	3–4	2–2
Estonia	1–0	3–1		3–1	7–0	3–0	2–0	2–0
Narva THK	3–5	0–4	2–3		0–3	0–5	3–1	5–1
Olümpia Tartu	2–1	3–0	0–7	1–0		2–3	3–2	0–4
Tallinna JK	1–1	3–3	3–3	2–1	4–1		7–0	5–1
Tervis	0–0	1–2	3–2	4–1	2–0	1–7		2–4
VS Sport	1–0	0–2	0–1	10–1	5–1	2–1	3–1	

Legend: Blue = home team win; Yellow = draw; Red = away team win.

== Top scorers ==
Pos	Name	Team	Goals
1	Osvald Kastanjan-Kastan	Tallinna Jalgpalliklubi	13
2	Johannes Niks	ESS Kalev Tallinn	10
3	Richard Kuremaa	JS Estonia Tallinn	8
4	Ralf Veidmann	ESS Kalev Tallinn	7
4	Otto Lõhmus	PK Olümpia Tartu	7
4	Heinrich Uukkivi	JS Estonia Tallinn	7
