= 1935 Baltic Cup =

International football competition

Tournament details
- Host country: Estonia
- Dates: 20–22 August
- Venue(s): 1 (in 1 host city)

Final positions
- Champions: Lithuania (2nd title)
- Runners-up: Latvia
- Third place: Estonia

Tournament statistics
- Matches played: 3
- Goals scored: 9 (3 per match)
- Attendance: 16,500 (5,500 per match)
- Top scorer(s): (Lithuania) Antanas Lingis (Latvia) Iļja Vestermans (2 goals)

The 1935 Baltic Cup was held in Tallinn, Estonia at Kadrioru staadion on 20–22 August 1935. It was the seventh edition of the tournament. Lithuania won the tournament with a win over Estonia and a draw against Latvia.

== Results ==
Team	Pld	W	D	L	GF	GA	GD	Pts
Lithuania	2	1	1	0	4	3	+1	3
Latvia	2	0	2	0	3	3	0	2
Estonia	2	0	1	1	2	3	–1	1

20 August 1935
18:00 (+2:00)

Estonia	1 – 2	Lithuania
Linberg 45'	Report	32' Jaškevičius; 75' Lingis

Kadrioru staadion, Tallinn
Attendance: 6,000
Referee: Rudolf Eklöw (Sweden)
21 August 1935
18:00 (+2:00)

Lithuania	2 – 2	Latvia
Lingis 33'; Marcinkus 54'	Report	17', 75' Vestermans

Kadrioru staadion, Tallinn
Attendance: 3,500
Referee: Rudolf Eklöw (Sweden)
22 August 1935
18:00 (+2:00)

Estonia	1 – 1	Latvia
Ellman-Eelma 59'	Report	80' Pētersons

Kadrioru staadion, Tallinn
Attendance: 7,000
Referee: Rudolf Eklöw (Sweden)

1935 Baltic Cup winner

Lithuania
Second title

== Statistics ==
=== Goalscorers ===
There were 9 goals scored in 3 matches, for an average of 3 goals per match.

2 goals

- (Latvia) Iļja Vestermans
- (Lithuania) Antanas Lingis

1 goal

- (Estonia) Nikolai Linberg
- (Estonia) Eduard Ellman-Eelma
- (Latvia) Ēriks Pētersons
- (Lithuania) Voldemaras Jaškevičius
- (Lithuania) Romualdas Marcinkus
