= Vaidas Žutautas =

Lithuanian footballer and manager

Personal information
- Full name: Vaidas Žutautas
- Date of birth: 18 July 1971 (age 55)
- Place of birth: Vilnius, Lithuania
- Height: 1.88 m (6 ft 2 in)
- Position: Goalkeeper

Team information
- Current team: Banga Gargždai (goalkeeping coach)

Senior career*
Years	Team	Apps	(Gls)
1992–1994	ROMAR Mažeikiai	14	(0)
1994–1995	Tervis Pärnu	4	(0)
1995–1997	Kareda	60	(0)
1997–1998	Royal Antwerp	3	(0)
1998–1999	Kareda	21	(0)
1999–2003	Hakoah Ramat Gan		
2003–2004	FK Sviesa	25	(0)
2004–2005	Šiauliai	9	(0)
2005–2006	Sūduva	52	(0)
2006–2009	Vėtra	2	(0)
2009	Banga Gargždai	2	(0)
2009	Wigry Suwałki	4	(0)
2010	Banga Gargždai	0	(0)

International career
1996–2006	Lithuania	9	(0)

Managerial career
- 2012–2013: Banga Gargždai
- * Club domestic league appearances and goals

Vaidas Žutautas (born 12 May 1973) is a Lithuanian professional football manager and former player who played as a goalkeeper. He is currently the goalkeeping coach of Banga Gargždai.

Žutautas has made nine appearances for the Lithuania national football team between 1996 and 2006.

== Honours ==
ROMAR

- A Lyga: 1993–94

Kareda

- A Lyga: 1996–97, 1997–98
- Lithuanian Cup: 1995–96, 1998–99

Latvia

- Baltic Cup: 2005
