= Eduard Eelma =

Estonian footballer (1902–1941)

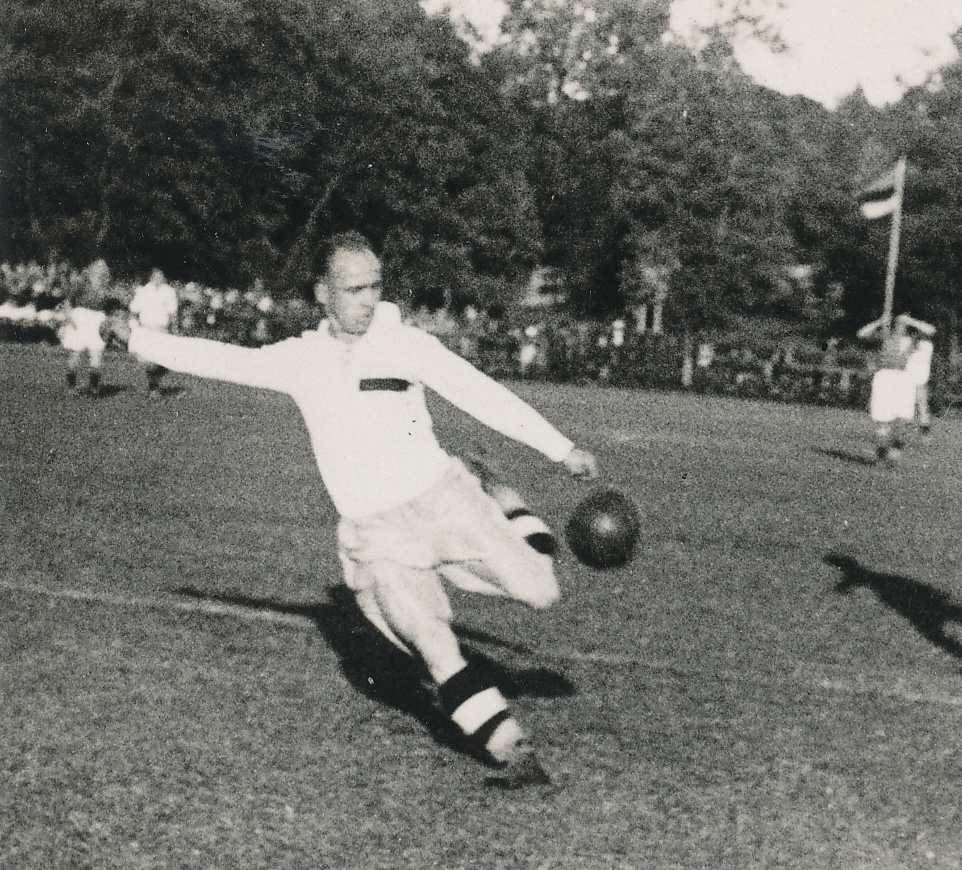

Personal information
- Date of birth: 7 April 1902
- Place of birth: Saint Petersburg, Russian Empire
- Date of death: 16 November 1941 (aged 39)
- Place of death: Kirov, Soviet Union
- Position: Forward

Senior career*
Years	Team	Apps	(Gls)
1919–1925	Kalev		
1925–1930	TJK		
1930–1935	JS Estonia Tallinn		

International career
1921–1935	Estonia	60	(21)
- * Club domestic league appearances and goals

Eduard Eelma (7 April 1902 – 16 November 1941) until 1937 Eduard-Vilhelm Ellmann, was an Estonian footballer — one of the most famous before World War II. He played 60 times for Estonia national football team and with 21 goals, was their record goalscorer during the country's first period of independence.

Eduard Eelma's international career lasted from 1921 to 1935 and his goalscoring record of 21 international goals was only beaten in 2002 by Indrek Zelinski, and later by Andres Oper. He also participated in the 1924 Summer Olympics in Paris.

Eduard Eelma was arrested by NKVD in Tallinn in summer 1941, sentenced to death and executed in Prison No. 1 in Kirov on 16 November 1941.

== Club career ==
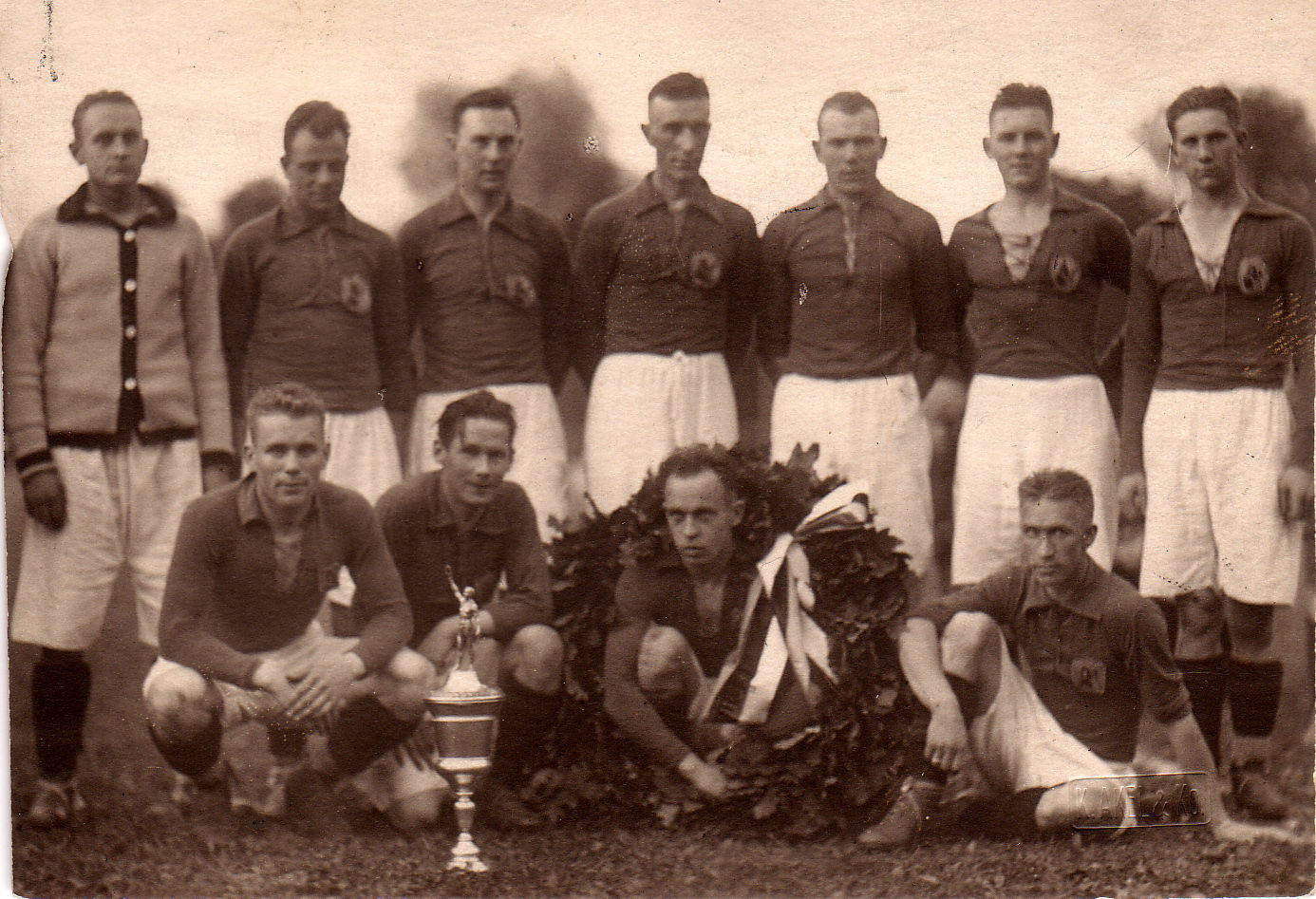
Eduard Elmann-Eelma (holding the oak wreath) and his TJK teammates posing with the 1928 Estonian Championship title

Ellmann-Eelma joined Kalev when he was 17 years old. They were crowned the Estonian champions in 1923, after Ellmann-Eelma scored two goals in their victorious 6–0 final against Tartu ASK. In 1925, he joined TJK and won the Estonian Championship in 1926 and 1928, again scoring twice in both of the finals.

In 1930, Eduard Ellmann-Eelma became one of the founding members of JS Estonia Tallinn. He captained the club to two Estonian Championship titles in 1934 and 1935, before retiring after the end of the triumphant 1935 season.

== International career ==
Ellmann-Eelma made his debut for the Estonia national football team in their first-ever home match, when Estonia drew 0–0 with Sweden at the Tiigiveski Ground on 23 July 1921. He also took part in the 1924 Summer Olympics in Paris, where Estonia faced USA in the opening round. In the second half of the match, Ellmann-Eelma earned a penalty for Estonia, but it was missed by his teammate Elmar Kaljot and Estonia ultimately lost the match 0–1.

In total, Eduard Eelma made 60 appearances for the national team and scored 21 goals, a record number during Estonia's first period of independence. Out of those 21 goals, ten were scored against Lithuania, eight against Latvia, two against Sweden and one against Finland. Eelma's goalscoring record was beaten in 2002 by Indrek Zelinski, and is now held by Andres Oper.

== Statistics ==
=== International ===
Appearances and goals by national team and year
National team	Year	Apps	Goals
Estonia
Estonia	1921	2	0
Estonia	1922	1	0
Estonia	1923	2	1
Estonia	1924	4	0
Estonia	1925	3	0
Estonia	1926	5	2
Estonia	1927	5	2
Estonia	1928	3	0
Estonia	1929	6	4
Estonia	1930	4	0
Estonia	1931	5	3
Estonia	1932	6	1
Estonia	1933	6	4
Estonia	1934	2	0
Estonia	1935	6	4
Total		60	21

== Honours ==
Kalev

- Estonian champion: 1923

TJK

- Estonian champion: 1926, 1928

JS Estonia Tallinn

- Estonian champion: 1934, 1935

Estonia

- Baltic Cup: 1929, 1931
