= Lithuania national football team records and statistics =

The following is a list of the Lithuania national football team's competitive records and statistics.

== Individual records ==
=== Player records ===
As of 17 November 2025
Players in bold are still active, at least at club level.

==== Most capped players ====
Rank	Player	Caps	Goals	Career
1	**Fedor Černych**	103	15	2012–present
2	Saulius Mikoliūnas	101	5	2004–2022
3	**Arvydas Novikovas**	96	12	2010–present
4	Andrius Skerla	84	1	1996–2011
5	Deividas Šemberas	82	0	1996–2013
6	**Vykintas Slivka**	74	3	2015–present
7	Tomas Danilevičius	71	19	1998–2012
8	**Justas Lasickas**	67	2	2018–present
9	Žydrūnas Karčemarskas	66	0	2003–2013
10	Aurelijus Skarbalius	65	5	1991–2005
10	Marius Stankevičius	65	5	2001–2013

==== Top goalscorers ====
Rank	Player	Goals	Caps	Ratio	Career
1	Tomas Danilevičius	19	71	0.27	1998–2012
2	**Fedor Černych**	15	103	0.15	2012–present
3	Antanas Lingis	12	33	0.36	1928–1938
3	**Arvydas Novikovas**	12	96	0.13	2010–present
5	Edgaras Jankauskas	10	56	0.18	1991–2008
6	Virginijus Baltušnikas	9	42	0.21	1990–1998
7	Jaroslavas Citavičius	8	24	0.33	1926–1933
7	Valdas Ivanauskas	8	28	0.29	1992–2000
7	Darius Maciulevičius	8	38	0.21	1991–2005
7	Robertas Poškus	8	48	0.17	1999–2011

== Competition records ==
=== FIFA World Cup ===
FIFA World Cup disc									Qualification record					
Year	Round	Position	Pld	W	D*	L	GF	GA	Pld	W	D	L	GF	GA
(Uruguay) 1930	Did not enter								Declined participation					
(Italy) 1934	Did not qualify								1	0	0	1	0	2
(France) 1938	Did not qualify								2	0	0	2	3	9
(Brazil) 1950	Part of the Soviet Union								Part of the Soviet Union					
(Switzerland) 1954	Part of the Soviet Union								Part of the Soviet Union					
(Sweden) 1958	Part of the Soviet Union								Part of the Soviet Union					
(Chile) 1962	Part of the Soviet Union								Part of the Soviet Union					
(England) 1966	Part of the Soviet Union								Part of the Soviet Union					
(Mexico) 1970	Part of the Soviet Union								Part of the Soviet Union					
(West Germany) 1974	Part of the Soviet Union								Part of the Soviet Union					
(Argentina) 1978	Part of the Soviet Union								Part of the Soviet Union					
(Spain) 1982	Part of the Soviet Union								Part of the Soviet Union					
(Mexico) 1986	Part of the Soviet Union								Part of the Soviet Union					
(Italy) 1990	Part of the Soviet Union								Part of the Soviet Union					
(United States) 1994	Did not qualify								12	2	3	7	8	21
(France) 1998	Did not qualify								10	5	2	3	11	8
(South Korea) (Japan) 2002	Did not qualify								8	0	2	6	3	20
(Germany) 2006	Did not qualify								10	2	4	4	8	9
(South Africa) 2010	Did not qualify								10	4	0	6	10	11
(Brazil) 2014	Did not qualify								10	3	2	5	9	11
(Russia) 2018	Did not qualify								10	1	3	6	7	20
(Qatar) 2022	Did not qualify								8	1	0	7	4	19
(Canada) (Mexico) (United States) 2026	Did not qualify								8	0	3	5	6	15
Total		0/9							89	18	19	52	69	145

=== UEFA European Championship ===
UEFA European Championship commemorate									Qualification record					
Year	Round	Position	Pld	W	D*	L	GF	GA	Pld	W	D	L	GF	GA
(France) 1960	Part of the Soviet Union								Part of the Soviet Union					
(Spain) 1964	Part of the Soviet Union								Part of the Soviet Union					
(Italy) 1968	Part of the Soviet Union								Part of the Soviet Union					
(Belgium) 1972	Part of the Soviet Union								Part of the Soviet Union					
(Socialist Federal Republic of Yugoslavia) 1976	Part of the Soviet Union								Part of the Soviet Union					
(Italy) 1980	Part of the Soviet Union								Part of the Soviet Union					
(France) 1984	Part of the Soviet Union								Part of the Soviet Union					
(West Germany) 1988	Part of the Soviet Union								Part of the Soviet Union					
(Sweden) 1992	Part of the Soviet Union								Part of the Soviet Union					
(England) 1996	Did not qualify								10	5	1	4	13	12
(Belgium) (Netherlands) 2000	Did not qualify								10	3	2	5	8	16
(Portugal) 2004	Did not qualify								8	3	1	4	7	11
(Austria) (Switzerland) 2008	Did not qualify								12	5	1	6	11	13
(Poland) (Ukraine) 2012	Did not qualify								8	1	2	5	4	13
(France) 2016	Did not qualify								10	3	1	6	7	18
(European Union) 2020	Did not qualify								8	0	1	7	5	25
(Germany) 2024	Did not qualify								8	1	3	4	8	14
Total		0/8							74	21	12	41	63	122

=== UEFA Nations League ===
UEFA Nations League record
Season**	Division	Group	Pld	W	D*	L	GF	GA	P/R	RK
(Portugal) 2018–19	C	4	6	0	0	6	3	16	Same position	39th
(Italy) 2020–21	C	4	6	2	2	2	5	7	Same position	41st
(Netherlands) 2022–23	C	1	8	2	1	5	4	14	Same position	47th
(Germany) 2024–25	C	1	6	0	0	6	4	11	▼	48th
Total			26	4	3	19	16	48	39th	

*Draws include knockout matches decided via penalty shoot-out.
**Group stage played home and away. Flag shown represents host nation for the finals stage.

== Head-to-head record ==
This list attempts to list every official and friendly game played by the Lithuania national football team since 1990. Although it has played a number of countries around the world, some repeatedly, Lithuania has played the most games (20) against neighbouring Latvia.

Opponents	P	W	D	L	GF	GA	GD	Win %
Albania	4	2	0	2	6	7	−1	50.00
Andorra	3	3	0	0	10	1	+9	100.00
Argentina	1	0	1	0	0	0	+0	0.00
Armenia	2	1	0	1	4	2	+2	50.00
Austria	3	1	0	2	3	6	−3	33.33
Azerbaijan	4	1	1	2	3	4	−1	25.00
Belarus	8	1	3	4	5	15	−10	12.50
Belgium	2	0	2	0	2	2	+0	0.00
Bosnia and Herzegovina	5	1	1	3	5	9	−4	20.00
Brazil	1	0	0	1	1	3	−2	0.00
Bulgaria	1	0	0	1	0	3	−3	0.00
Chile	1	0	0	1	0	1	−1	0.00
Croatia	2	0	1	1	0	2	−2	0.00
Cyprus	3	1	0	2	3	4	−1	33.33
Czech Republic	5	1	0	4	4	13	−9	20.00
Denmark	2	0	1	1	0	4	−4	0.00
Estonia	18	10	4	4	41	15	+26	55.56
Faroe Islands	8	6	1	1	11	4	+7	75.00
Finland	7	2	1	4	8	19	−11	28.57
France	4	0	0	4	0	5	−5	0.00
Georgia	8	3	1	4	6	11	−5	37.50
Germany	2	0	1	1	1	3	−2	0.00
Greece	3	1	0	2	2	4	−2	33.33
Hungary	4	0	1	3	2	10	−8	0.00
Indonesia	2	1	1	0	6	2	+4	50.00
Republic of Ireland	4	0	1	3	1	5	−4	0.00
Iceland	4	1	1	2	2	6	−4	25.00
Israel	6	0	2	4	8	14	−6	0.00
Italy	6	0	2	4	1	12	−11	0.00
Jordan	1	0	0	1	0	3	−3	0.00
Kosovo	1	0	0	1	1	2	−1	0.00
Kuwait	1	0	0	1	0	1	−1	0.00
Latvia	20	9	5	6	24	23	+1	45.00
Liechtenstein	3	3	0	0	6	1	+5	100.00
Luxembourg	1	1	0	0	1	0	+1	100.00
North Macedonia	2	2	0	0	4	1	+3	100.00
Mali	1	0	0	1	1	3	−2	0.00
Malta	4	1	3	0	6	3	+3	25.00
Moldova	8	3	3	2	12	8	+4	37.50
Montenegro	4	0	1	3	3	10	−7	0.00
Netherlands	2	0	0	2	2	7	−5	0.00
Northern Ireland	2	0	1	1	2	3	−1	0.00
Norway	1	0	0	1	0	1	−1	0.00
Poland	10	2	3	5	7	15	−8	20.00
Portugal	2	0	0	2	2	9	−7	0.00
Romania	8	1	0	7	4	12	−8	12.50
Russia	2	0	0	2	4	8	−4	0.00
San Marino	2	2	0	0	5	0	+5	100.00
Serbia (Note: Includes results against Yugoslavia and Serbia and Montenegro)	5	1	0	4	3	12	−9	20.00
Scotland	7	1	2	4	3	9	−6	14.29
Slovakia	2	0	1	1	2	3	−1	0.00
Slovenia	2	2	0	0	4	2	+2	100.00
Spain	6	0	1	5	2	14	−12	0.00
Sri Lanka	1	1	0	0	2	0	+2	100.00
Sweden	1	0	0	1	2	4	−2	0.00
Turkmenistan	1	1	0	0	2	1	+1	100.00
Ukraine	7	2	0	5	8	15	−7	28.57
