= 1943 Estonian Football Championship =

1943 Estonian Championship
Final positions
- Champions: JS Estonia Tallinn (6th title)

The Estonian Top Division 1943 was the 22nd football league season in Estonia. First round started on 1 May and ended on 27 June. Second round started on 8 August and ended on 24 October. JS Estonia Tallinn won the title.

== League table ==
Pos	Team	Pld	W	D	L	GF	GA	GD	Pts
1	JS Estonia Tallinn (C)	10	7	2	1	27	19	+8	16
2	VS Sport Tallinn	10	5	2	3	21	13	+8	12
3	Pärnu Tervis	10	4	2	4	31	25	+6	10
4	Narva Spordiklubi	10	3	2	5	19	26	−7	8
5	Tartu Politsei Spordiring	10	3	1	6	18	25	−7	7
6	Tallinna Spordiklubi	10	3	1	6	14	22	−8	7

Source: RSSSF
(C) Champions

== Results ==
Home \ Away	EST	NAR	TSK	TAR	TER	VST
Estonia		3–3	4–1	4–2	1–8	2–1
Narva SK	-:+		1–2	0–4	4–4	2–1
Tallinna SK	0–3	5–1		4–1	0–2	0–1
Tartu PS	2–3	0–2	2–0		3–1	0–3
Tervis	2–7	3–5	6–1	1–1		3–1
VS Sport	0–0	4–1	1–1	7–3	2–1	

Legend: Blue = home team win; Yellow = draw; Red = away team win.
