= Aivaras Laurišas =

Lithuanian footballer (born 1977)

Personal information
- Full name: Aivaras Laurišas
- Date of birth: 15 April 1977 (age 49)
- Place of birth: Tauragė, Lithuanian SSR, Soviet Union
- Height: 1.82 m (5 ft 11 1/2 in)
- Position: Forward

Team information
- Current team: FK Tauras Tauragė

Senior career*
Years	Team	Apps	(Gls)
1997–1999	FBK Kaunas	19	(9)
1999	FK Atlantas	11	(6)
2000	FK Daugava Rīga	23	(6)
2001	Dinaburg FC	8	(2)
2003	FC Fakel-Voronezh Voronezh	5	(2)
2004–2006	FK Atlantas	58	(20)
2006–2007	FC Vilnius	16	(8)
2007–2009	FBK Kaunas	23	(2)
2009	FK Tauras Tauragė	4	(1)

International career^{‡}
1998–2005	Lithuania	3	(0)
- * Club domestic league appearances and goals as of 17 December 2009 ‡ National team caps and goals as of 24 May 2009

Aivaras Laurišas (born 15 April 1977) is a Lithuanian football forward, who plays for FK Tauras Tauragė. He obtained three caps for the Lithuania national football team, scoring no goals. Laurišas also played as a professional in Russia and Latvia during his career.

== Honours ==
National Team

- Baltic Cup
  - 2005
