= 2005 Baltic Cup =

International football competition

Tournament details
- Host country: Lithuania
- Dates: 21 May 2005
- Teams: 2
- Venue(s): 1 (in 1 host city)

Final positions
- Champions: Lithuania (9th title)
- Runners-up: Latvia

Tournament statistics
- Matches played: 1
- Goals scored: 2 (2 per match)
- Top scorer(s): (Lithuania) Igoris Morinas (2 goals)

The 2005 Baltic Cup football competition took place without one of the usual contenders in this Baltic states' championship: Estonia. Therefore, the event was reduced to a single match between Lithuania and Latvia.

== Match ==
=== Lithuania vs Latvia ===
21 May 2005
16:30

Lithuania	2–0	Latvia
Morinas 25', 81'	Report

Darius Girėnas Stadium, Kaunas

Lithuania:
GK	Vaidas Žutautas
DF	Darius Regelskis		(substituted off) 84'
DF	Arūnas Klimavičius
DF	Gediminas Paulauskas
DF	Irmantas Zelmikas
MF	Nerijus Barasa	(yellow card) 36'	(substituted off) 71'
MF	Aurimas Kučys
MF	Darius Maciulevičius		(substituted off) 46'
MF	Igoris Morinas (c)		(substituted off) 87'
FW	Aivaras Laurisas		(substituted off) 78'
FW	Andrius Velička		(substituted off) 46'
Substitutions:
FW	Nerijus Astrauskas		(substituted in) 46'
MF	Eimantas Poderis		(substituted in) 46'
DF	Tadas Papečkys		(substituted in) 71'
FW	Tomas Radzinevičius		(substituted in) 78'
DF	Tadas Gražiūnas		(substituted in) 84'
FW	Ričardas Beniušis		(substituted in) 87'
Manager:
(Lithuania) Algimantas Liubinskas

Latvia:
GK	Andrejs Piedels		(substituted off) 46'
DF	Mihails Zemļinskis (c)
DF	Valentīns Lobaņovs		(substituted off) 46'
DF	Aleksandrs Isakovs
DF	Dzintars Zirnis	(yellow card) 53' (red card) 54'
DF	Artūrs Zakreševskis
MF	Aleksejs Višņakovs		(substituted off) 81'
MF	Genādijs Soloņicins	(yellow card) 63'
MF	Viktors Morozs		(substituted off) 28'
FW	Andrejs Štolcers		(substituted off) 57'
FW	Igors Sļesarčuks		(substituted off) 59'
Substitutions:
FW	Gatis Kalniņš		(substituted in) 28'
GK	Deniss Romanovs		(substituted in) 46'
DF	Vladimirs Žavoronkovs		(substituted in) 46'
FW	Ruslans Mihaļčuks		(substituted in) 57'
FW	Kristaps Blanks		(substituted in) 59'
FW	Mihails Miholaps		(substituted in) 81'
Manager:
(Latvia) Jurijs Andrejevs

== Winners ==
2005 Baltic Football Cup winners

Lithuania
Ninth title

== Statistics ==
=== Goalscorers ===
There were 2 goals scored in 1 match, for an average of 2 goals per match.

2 goals

- (Lithuania) Igoris Morinas
