= Elmar Kaljot =

Estonian footballer (1901–1969)

Elmar Gustav Kaljot
Personal information
- Date of birth: 15 November 1901
- Place of birth: Tallinn, Estonia
- Date of death: 8 January 1969 (aged 67)
- Place of death: New York City, United States
- Position: Midfielder

Senior career*
Years	Team	Apps	(Gls)
1922–1925	JK Tallinna Kalev		
1925–1930	Tallinna Jalgpalliklubi		
1930–1933	JS Estonia Tallinn		

International career
1923–1929	Estonia	25	(3)
- * Club domestic league appearances and goals

Elmar Gustav Kaljot (15 November 1901 – 8 January 1969) was an Estonian footballer.

== Career ==
Kaljot played 25 times for the Estonian national team between 1923 and 1929. He played for three different teams in Estonian top flight and participated at the 1924 Summer Olympics and won the 1929 Baltic Cup.

He was Estonian champion in five occasions, last two times as a coach. During World War II, he fled to Germany in 1944 and in 1948 he moved to the United States, where he lived until his death in 1969.

== Honours ==
- Estonian Top Division: 1923, 1926, 1928, 1934, 1935
