= Uukkivi =

Family name

Uukkivi is an Estonian language surname. Notable people with the surname include:

- Heinrich Uukkivi (1912–1943), Estonian footballer, bandy, and ice hockey player
- Ivo Uukkivi (born 1965), Estonian actor and singer
- Raivo Uukkivi (born 1962), Estonian politician
