= Alberts Vaters =

Latvian footballer

Personal information
- Date of birth: 29 September 1905
- Place of birth: Riga, Latvia
- Date of death: 3 November 1928 (aged 23)
- Place of death: Riga, Latvia
- Position: Forward

Senior career*
Years	Team	Apps	(Gls)
1925–1926	JKS Riga		
1926–1928	LSB Riga		
1928	Vanderer Riga		

International career
1928	Latvia	5	(2)
- * Club domestic league appearances and goals

Alberts Vaters (29 September 1905 – 3 November 1928) was a Latvian football forward and midfielder who played five international matches for the Latvia national football team in 1928, shortly before his death.

== Biography ==
Vaters was known as a sportsman in Latvia since 1921, however his career in football really took off in 1925 when he played with JKS Riga which in that year finished second in the top Riga football league (Vaters was more of a reserves player then though). The following season was less successful for JKS and at the end of it Vaters moved to a stronger side - LSB Riga. In 1926 he also played in several matches for the Riga garrison selected team alongside more famous footballers like Arvīds Jurgens, Pēteris Lauks, Arvīds Bārda and Arkādijs Pavlovs.

In 1927 Vaters was called up to the national team for a friendly match against Sweden, however he wasn't chosen to play in the match. Still Vaters played for the Riga selected team in several matches.

In 1928 Vaters was chosen to play in the national team in the Baltic Cup and in the first game of the tournament against Lithuania he scored two goals, thus making one of the brightest débuts in the history of the national team. After coming out victorious from the Baltic Cup Vaters also capped in the next 3 international friendlies for Latvia in 1928.

In the autumn of 1928 Vaters left LSB Riga and joined Vanderer Riga, but he did not appear in any matches for the side as he was giving away to a cocaine addiction and he died of an overdose on 3 November 1928.

== Statistics ==
=== International ===
Appearances and goals by national team and year
National team	Year	Apps	Goals
Latvia
Latvia	1928	5	2
Total		5	2

=== International goals ===
As of match played 23 September 1928. Latvia score listed first, score column indicates score after each Vaters goal.

International goals by date, venue, cap, opponent, score, result and competition
No.	Date	Venue	Cap	Opponent	Score	Result	Competition
1	25 July 1928	Kadrioru Staadion, Tallinn, Estonia	1	Estonia	2–0	3–0	1928 Baltic Cup
2	25 July 1928	Kadrioru Staadion, Tallinn, Estonia	1	Estonia	3–0	3–0	1928 Baltic Cup

== Honours ==
=== Club ===
LSB Riga

- Riga Football Cup: 1926
