= Gediminas Paulauskas =

Lithuanian footballer

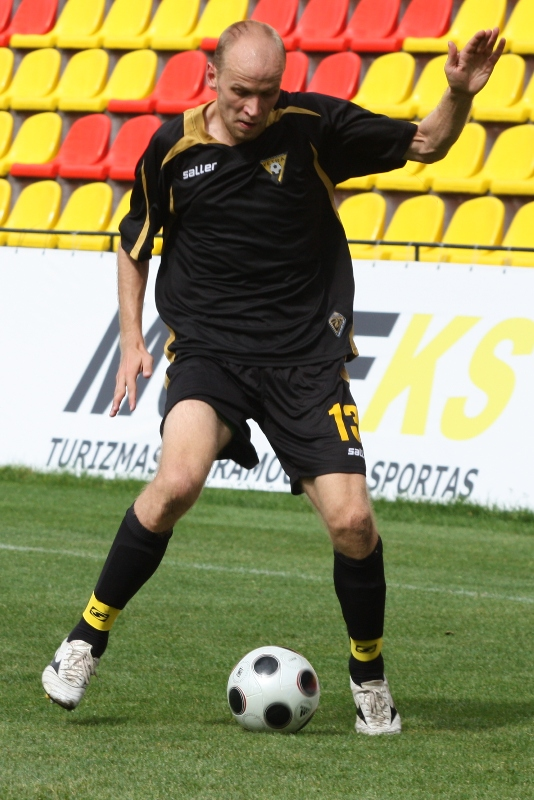

Personal information
- Full name: Gediminas Paulauskas
- Date of birth: 27 October 1982 (age 44)
- Place of birth: Panevėžys, Lithuanian SSR
- Height: 1.80 m (5 ft 11 in)
- Position: Defender

Youth career
- 1998–2000: Ekranas Panevėžys

Senior career*
Years	Team	Apps	(Gls)
1998–2007	Ekranas Panevėžys	180	(12)
2008	Ankaragücü	1	(0)
2008	Bellinzona	6	(0)
2008–2009	Vėtra	32	(2)
2010–2011	Illichivets Mariupol	7	(0)
2011–2012	Piast Gliwice	15	(1)
2012	Brest	6	(0)
2013	Kruoja Pakruojis	5	(0)
2014	Andijon	0	(0)

International career
2005–2009	Lithuania	22	(0)
- * Club domestic league appearances and goals

Gediminas Paulauskas (born 27 October 1982) is a Lithuanian former professional footballer who played as a defender.

From February to June 2008, he played for AC Bellinzona after being released by MKE Ankaragücü in February. In December 2007, MKE Ankaragücü signed him from FK Ekranas. In July 2008, he turned back to his homeland and move to Vetra Vilnius, signing a deal until 31 December 2009.

Paulauskas has made 22 appearances for the Lithuania national football team.

== Honours ==
Ekranas

- A Lyga: 2005

Latvia

- Baltic Cup: 2005
