= 1933 Baltic Cup =

International football competition

Tournament details
- Host country: Lithuania
- Dates: 2–4 September
- Venue: 1 (in 1 host city)

Tournament statistics
- Matches played: 3
- Goals scored: 7 (2.33 per match)
- Attendance: 9,000 (3,000 per match)
- Top scorer(s): (Latvia) Ēriks Pētersons (2 goals)

The 1933 Baltic Cup was held in Kaunas, Lithuania from 2 to 4 September 1933. It was the sixth time three Baltic states — Estonia, Latvia and Lithuania — came together to play a friendly tournament and determine the best team amongst them.

== Controversy ==
Lithuania played Estonia first, the match was stopped due to darkness. On the next day Latvia beat Estonia. In the morning of the third day, before the Lithuania–Latvia match the hosts surprised officials with a tour to a local brewery. Estonian newspaper Päevaleht reported that the Finnish referee for the match was really jolly, but did a horrible job, mostly favouring Lithuanian hosts. The match was stopped due to darkness and ended with a draw.

The rules demanded that at least two wins were necessary to win the championship. In the team meeting Latvia demanded that Lithuania–Estonia match should be re-played first. Latvia was hoping for an advantage against tired Lithuanian team in their match. Lithuania and Estonia disagreed noting that Latvia had won their match against Estonia, so Latvian win against Lithuania would grant Latvians the championship and end the tournament. Consensus was not reached and Latvian team left the same day. The championship was not awarded.

== Results ==
2 September 1933
16:30 (+2:00)

Lithuania	1 – 1 Abandoned (a.e.t.)	Estonia
Citavičius 55'	Report	15' Kuremaa

Kariuomenės stadionas, Kaunas
Attendance: 3,000
Referee: Yrjö Tuhkunen (Finland)

Match abandoned at 1–1 due to darkness after first period of extra time.

5 September 1933
Refixture

Lithuania	Cancelled	Estonia

Kariuomenės stadionas, Kaunas

3 September 1933
16:30 (+2:00)

Estonia	0 – 1	Latvia
	Report	35' Šeibelis

Kariuomenės stadionas, Kaunas
Attendance: 3,000
Referee: Yrjö Tuhkunen (Finland)

4 September 1933
16:00 (+2:00)

Lithuania	2 – 2 Abandoned	Latvia
Sabaliauskas 33'; Lingis 55'	Report	52', 65' Pētersons

Kariuomenės stadionas, Kaunas
Attendance: 3,000
Referee: Yrjö Tuhkunen (Finland)

Match abandoned at 2–2 due to darkness.

Refixture

Lithuania	Cancelled	Latvia

Kariuomenės stadionas, Kaunas

== Final table ==
Team	Pld	W	D	L	GF	GA	GD	Pts
Latvia	2	1	1	0	3	2	+1	3
Lithuania	2	0	2	0	3	3	0	2
Estonia	2	0	1	1	1	2	–1	1

The final table is given, without the replayed match on 5 September (presumably based on an agreement between the countries prior to the 1935 edition).

Champion undecided due to disagreements over match times

== Statistics ==
=== Goalscorers ===
There were 7 goals scored in 3 matches, for an average of 2.33 goals per match.

2 goals

- (Latvia) Ēriks Pētersons

1 goal

- (Estonia) Richard Kuremaa
- (Latvia) Alberts Šeibelis
- (Lithuania) Zigmas Sabaliauskas
- (Lithuania) Antanas Lingis
- (Lithuania) Jaroslavas Citavičius
