= Darius Regelskis =

Lithuanian footballer

Personal information
- Full name: Darius Regelskis
- Date of birth: 15 April 1976 (age 50)
- Place of birth: Lithuanian SSR, USSR
- Height: 1.78 m (5 ft 10 in)
- Position: Left back

Team information
- Current team: FK Tauras Tauragė
- Number: 3

Senior career*
Years	Team	Apps	(Gls)
1993–2005	FBK Kaunas	246	(6)
1998	→ Kauno Jėgeriai (loan)	2	(0)
2005	FK Atlantas	6	(0)
2006	FC Levadia	24	(0)
2007	FK Šilutė	19	(0)
2008	Blāzma Rēzekne	14	(0)
2009–2010	FK Tauras Tauragė	44	(2)

International career^{‡}
1998–2005	Lithuania	9	(0)
- * Club domestic league appearances and goals as of 7 November 2024 ‡ National team caps and goals as of 10 July 2008

Darius Regelskis (born 15 April 1976) is a Lithuanian professional footballer. He was playing the position of defender and is 1.78 m tall and weighs 71 kg. Regelskis spent the prime years of his career playing for FBK Kaunas. He is a former member of the Lithuania national football team.

== Honours ==
National Team

- Baltic Cup
  - 2005
