= Lingis =

Lingis is a surname. Notable people with the surname include:

- Alphonso Lingis (1933–2025), Lithuanian-American philosopher, writer and translator
- Antanas Lingis (1905–1941), Lithuanian footballer
