= JS Estonia Tallinn =

Association football club in Estonia

Estonia
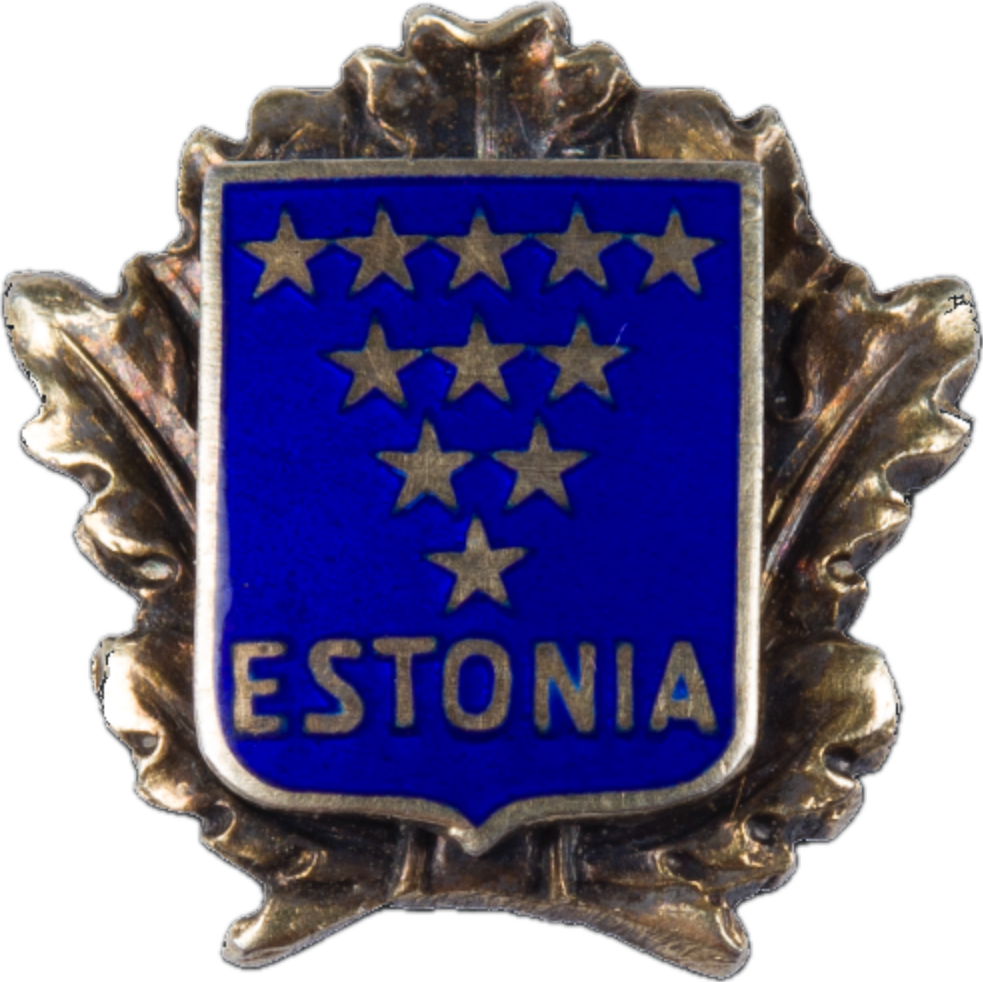
- Full name: Jalgpalliselts Estonia Tallinn
- Founded: 19 November 1930; 94 years ago
- Dissolved: August 1944
- Ground: Kadriorg Stadium
- Capacity: 5,000
Home colours

Jalgpalliselts Estonia Tallinn was an Estonian football club based in Tallinn. Founded in 1930 by active and ex-footballers, the club won five domestic league titles and were the second most successful football club in Estonia during the country's first period of independence.

The club was dissolved in 1944 due to Soviet occupation of Estonia. JS Estonia's five consecutive league titles from 1934 to 1939 has remained to be the Estonian top division record in terms of consecutive titles.

== History ==
=== Founded in secret (1928–1930) ===
Although the official foundation of Jalgpalliselts Estonia dates to November 1930, the first attempt to establish the club took place on 27 February 1928 by several Sport and TJK players. As the players had founded the club in secret and informed their former clubs only two days prior to transfer deadline day, rival clubs opposed and the formation of the new club fell through.

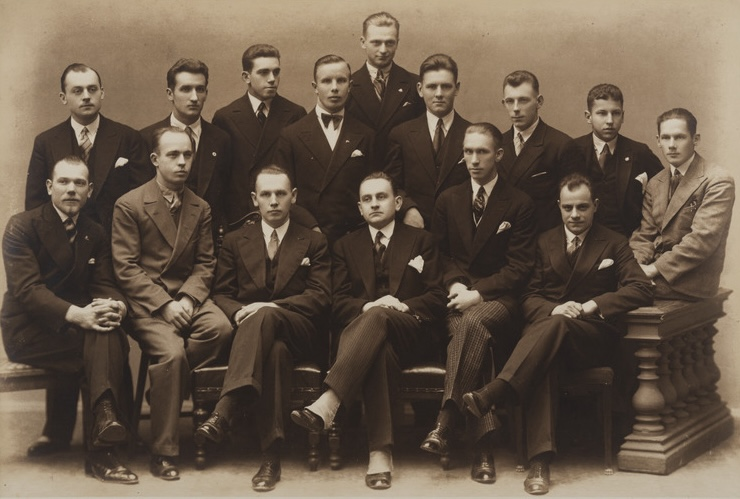
The founders of JS Estonia included many active and ex-footballers, among them Eduard Eelma and Arnold Pihlak.

In November 1930, a number of prominent Estonian footballers revived the plan to form JS Estonia and on 19 November, the club was accepted as a member by the Estonian FA. The formation of Jalgpalliselts Estonia was driven by footballers who felt growing discontent in other clubs and saw the need for a strictly football-concentrated club to make better use of the income generated from football matches. The club's name was inspired by Austria Wien and Hungária Budapest, and the team began playing in blue shirts.

=== Domestic dominance (1931–1944) ===
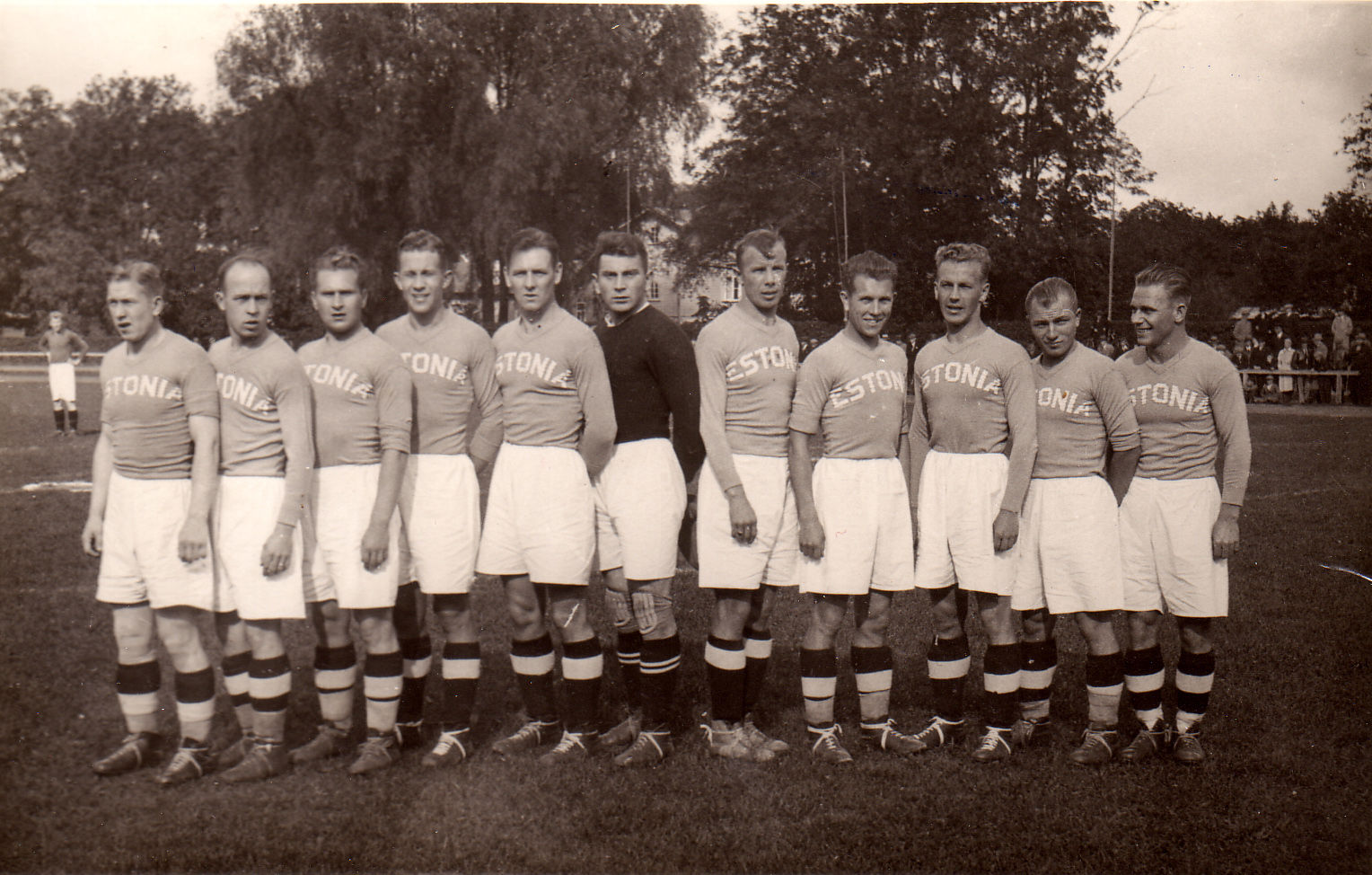
JS Estonia Tallinn footballers

Despite strong performances in their first preseason, including a 3–0 win against Finnish bronze medalists Helsingin Palloseura and a 2–0 win against Estonian champions Kalev, JS Estonia suffered a surprise 2–3 loss to Narva THK and failed to win promotion to the Estonian Championship. Despite playing in the second division, four players were still selected to the national team during their first season in existence.

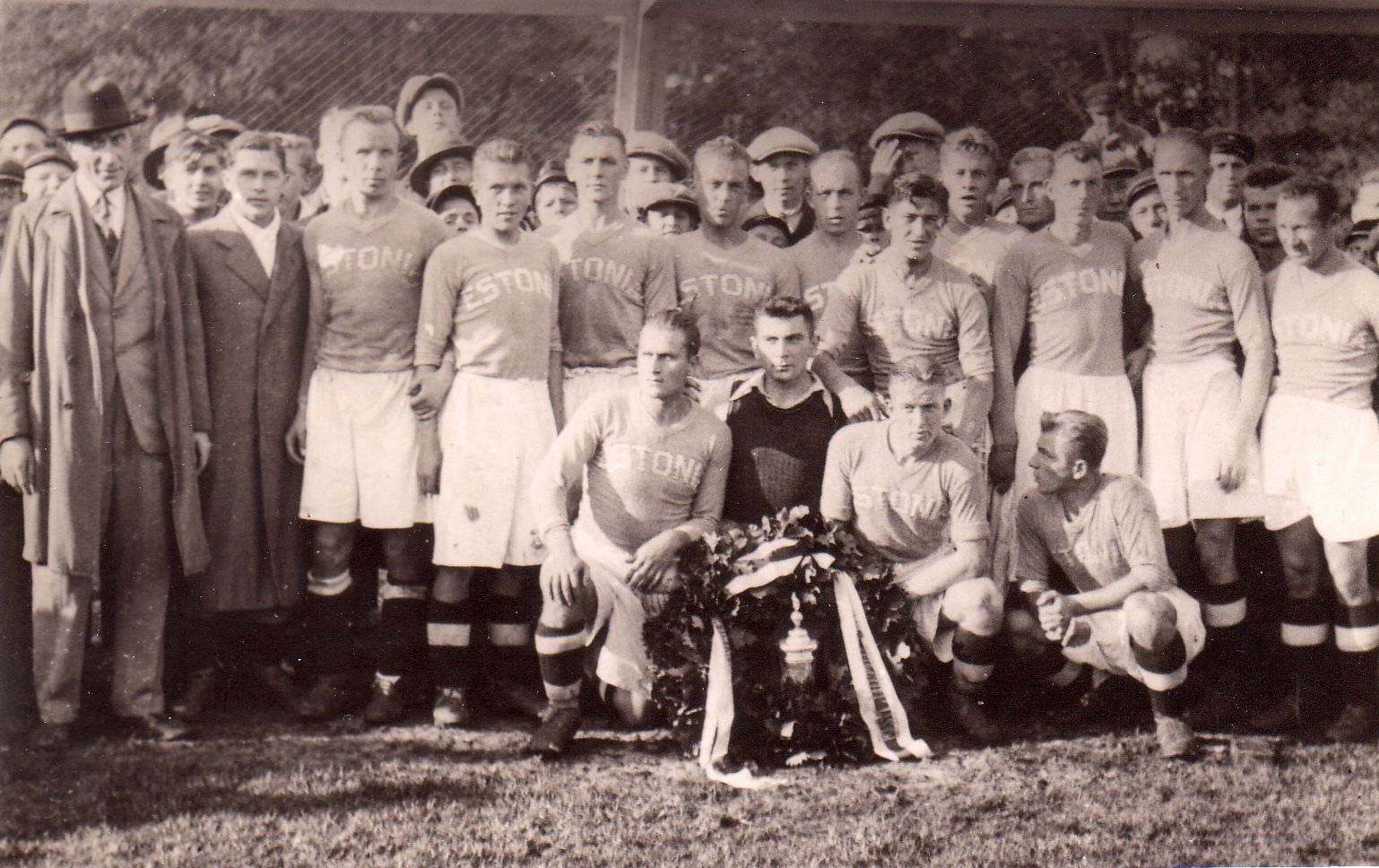
JS Estonia with their first Estonian Championship title in 1934

JS Estonia won promotion to the top division for the 1933 season, where they finished runners-up to Sport. The club won their first Estonian Championship title in 1934 without losing a single game, and repeated the feat in 1935. The team's 23-game unbeaten run came to an end during the 1936 season, but nonetheless they became the Estonian champions by a five-point margin ahead of Sport and scored 60 goals in 14 games – a number which remained to be the pre-war record.

Throughout their period of dominance, the club became the leading provider of players for the Estonia national team and at their peak, on 22 June 1938 during Estonia–Hungary, had ten players in the starting line-up of the national team. JS Estonia won their fourth and fifth league titles in the 1937–38 and 1938–39 seasons, with their last title coming by a six-point margin ahead of second placed TJK. In the last official season before World War II, the club narrowly finished as runners-up to Tartu Olümpia.

The club was dissolved in 1941 after the Soviet Union occupied Estonia, but was re-established a year later during the German occupation and won the unofficial league title in 1943. Jalgpalliselts Estonia Tallinn was closed down in 1944 after Soviet Union retook Estonia.

== Managerial history ==
Dates	Name
1930–1936	(Estonia) Elmar Kaljot
1937	(Estonia) Elmar Saar
1938–1944	(Estonia) Elmar Kaljot

== Seasons and statistics ==
Season	Division	Pos	Pld	W	D	L	GF	GA	GD	Pts	Top goalscorer
1931	B Division	N/A	1	0	0	1	2	3	−1	–	N/A
1932	B Division	1	3	2	1	0	8	2	+6	5	N/A
1933	Top Division	2	10	7	1	2	35	10	+25	15	(Estonia) Heinrich Uukkivi (9)
1934	Top Division	1	10	7	3	0	22	3	+19	17	(Estonia) Eduard Eelmann-Eelma (5)
1935	Top Division	1	7	6	1	0	26	3	+23	13	(Estonia) Valter Mäng (7)
1936	Top Division	1	14	11	1	2	60	15	+45	23	(Estonia) Nikolai Linberg (21)
1937–38	Top Division	1	14	10	2	2	51	17	+34	22	(Estonia) Heinrich Uukkivi (12)
1938–39	Top Division	1	14	11	1	2	40	11	+29	23	(Estonia) Richard Kuremaa (8)
1939–40	Top Division	2	14	9	3	2	39	14	+25	21	(Estonia) Nikolai Linberg (15)

== Honours ==
=== League ===
- Estonian Championship
  - Winners (5): 1934, 1935, 1936, 1937–38, 1938–39
