= 1932 Baltic Cup =

International football competition

Tournament details
- Host country: Latvia
- Dates: 28–30 August
- Venue: 1 (in 1 host city)

Final positions
- Champions: Latvia (2nd title)
- Runners-up: Lithuania
- Third place: Estonia

Tournament statistics
- Matches played: 3
- Goals scored: 9 (3 per match)
- Attendance: 12,000 (4,000 per match)
- Top scorer: (Latvia) Alberts Šeibelis (2 goals)

The 1932 Baltic Cup was held in Riga, Latvia from 28 to 30 August 1932. It was the fifth time three Baltic countries — Estonia, Latvia and Lithuania — came together to play a friendly tournament and determine the best team amongst them. Latvia won the tournament, beating both opponents.

== Results ==
Team	Pld	W	D	L	GF	GA	GD	Pts
Latvia	2	2	0	0	5	1	+4	4
Lithuania	2	1	0	1	3	5	–2	2
Estonia	2	0	0	2	1	3	–2	0

28 August 1932
17:30 (+2:00)

Latvia	4 – 1	Lithuania
Pētersons 52'; Šeibelis 53'; Jēnihs 65'; Tauriņš 73'	Report	15' Citavičius

JKS stadions, Riga
Attendance: 4,000
Referee: Sven Klang (Sweden)
29 August 1932
18:00 (+2:00)

Estonia	1 – 2	Lithuania
Mõtlik 11'	Report	30' Čižauskas; 70' Lingis

JKS stadions, Riga
Attendance: 3,000
Referee: Sven Klang (Sweden)
30 August 1932
18:00 (+2:00)

Latvia	1 – 0	Estonia
Šeibelis 58'	Report

JKS stadions, Riga
Attendance: 5,000
Referee: Sven Klang (Sweden)

1932 Baltic Cup winner

Latvia
Second title

== Statistics ==
=== Goalscorers ===
There were 9 goals scored in 3 matches, for an average of 3 goals per match.

2 goals

- (Latvia) Alberts Šeibelis

1 goal

- (Estonia) Roman Mõtlik
- (Latvia) Ēriks Pētersons
- (Latvia) Hermanis Jēnihs
- (Latvia) Arnolds Tauriņš
- (Lithuania) Jaroslavas Citavičius
- (Lithuania) Eduardas Čižauskas
- (Lithuania) Antanas Lingis
