= 1930 Baltic Cup =

International football competition

Tournament details
- Country: Lithuania
- Dates: 15–17 August
- Teams: 3

Final positions
- Champions: Lithuania (1st title)
- Runners-up: Latvia
- Third place: Estonia

Tournament statistics
- Matches played: 3
- Goals scored: 14 (4.67 per match)
- Attendance: 11,100 (3,700 per match)
- Top goal scorer(s): (Latvia) Ēriks Pētersons (4 goals)

The 1930 Baltic Cup was the third playing of the Baltic Cup football tournament. It was held in Kaunas, Lithuania from 15 to 17 August 1930.

== Results ==
Team	Pld	W	D	L	GF	GA	GD	Pts
Lithuania	2	1	1	0	5	4	+1	3
Latvia	2	1	1	0	6	5	+1	3
Estonia	2	0	0	2	3	5	–2	0

15 August 1930
17:00 UTC+02:00

Lithuania	2–1	Estonia
Citavičius 65'; Lingis 67'	Report	Karm 49'

Kariuomenės Stadionas, Kaunas
Attendance: 2,600
Referee: Georg Muntau (Germany)
16 August 1930
17:00 UTC+02:00

Latvia	3–2	Estonia
Pētersons 11'; Žins 15'; Dambrēvics 56'	Report	Einman 18'; Karm 38'

Makabi Stadionas, Kaunas
Attendance: 3,500
Referee: Georg Muntau (Germany)
17 August 1930
17:00 UTC+02:00

Lithuania	3–3	Latvia
Citavičius 32'; Lingis 46'; Chmelevskis 89'	Report	Pētersons 37', 61', 64'

Kariuomenės Stadionas, Kaunas
Attendance: 5,000
Referee: Georg Muntau (Germany)

1930 Baltic Cup winner

Lithuania
First title

== Statistics ==
=== Goalscorers ===
There were 14 goals scored in 3 matches, for an average of 4.67 goals per match.

4 goals

- (Latvia) Ēriks Pētersons

2 goals

- (Lithuania) Jaroslavas Citavičius
- (Estonia) Friedrich Karm
- (Lithuania) Antanas Lingis

1 goal

- (Estonia) Eugen Einman
- (Latvia) Voldemārs Žins
- (Latvia) Fricis Dambrēvics
- (Lithuania) Stepas Chmelevskis
