= 1938 Baltic Cup =

International football competition

Tournament details
- Host country: Estonia
- Dates: 3–5 September
- Venue: 1 (in 1 host city)

Final positions
- Champions: Estonia (3rd title)
- Runners-up: Latvia
- Third place: Lithuania

Tournament statistics
- Matches played: 3
- Goals scored: 8 (2.67 per match)
- Attendance: 22,000 (7,333 per match)
- Top scorer: (Estonia) Ralf Veidemann (2 goals)

The 1938 Baltic Cup was held in Tallinn, Estonia at Kadrioru staadion on 3–5 September 1938. It was the tenth edition of the tournament and the last one before the Soviet occupation of the three Baltic countries. Estonia won the tournament with a win over Lithuania and a draw against Latvia.

== Results ==
Team	Pld	W	D	L	GF	GA	GD	Pts
Estonia	2	1	1	0	4	2	+2	3
Latvia	2	0	2	0	2	2	0	2
Lithuania	2	0	1	1	2	4	–2	1

3 September 1938
17:30 (+2:00)

Estonia	3 – 1	Lithuania
Veidemann 40', 44'; Uukkivi 69'	Report	72' Šurkus

Kadrioru staadion, Tallinn
Attendance: 7,000
Referee: Friedrich Bouillon (Germany)
4 September 1938
17:30 (+2:00)

Latvia	1 – 1	Lithuania
Krupšs 87'	Report	28' Jaškevičius

Kadrioru staadion, Tallinn
Attendance: 3,000
Referee: Friedrich Bouillon (Germany)
5 September 1938
17:30 (+2:00)

Estonia	1 – 1	Latvia
Kass 12'	Report	49' Raisters

Kadrioru staadion, Tallinn
Attendance: 11,000
Referee: Friedrich Bouillon (Germany)

1938 Baltic Cup winner

Estonia
Third title

== Statistics ==
=== Goalscorers ===
There were 8 goals scored in 3 matches, for an average of 2.67 goals per match.

2 goals

- (Estonia) Ralf Veidemann

1 goal

- (Estonia) Heinrich Uukkivi
- (Estonia) Leonhard Kass
- (Latvia) Ēriks Raisters
- (Latvia) Francis Krupšs
- (Lithuania) Kazys Šurkus
- (Lithuania) Voldemaras Jaškevičius
