= Antanas Lingis =

Lithuanian footballer (1905–1941)

Personal information
- Date of birth: 26 December 1905
- Place of birth: Kaunas County, Kaunas, Lithuania, Russian Empire
- Date of death: 6 June 1941 (aged 35)
- Position: Forward

Senior career*
Years	Team	Apps	(Gls)
1923–1924	KSK Kaunas		
1926	Kovas Kaunas		
1928	LFLS Kaunas	3	
1929	KSK Kaunas	1	
1930–1933	LFLS Kaunas	18	(8)
1934–1938	MSK Kaunas	11	(4)
Total		33	(11)

International career
1928–1938	Lithuania	33	(12)
Medal record
Men's Football
Representing Lithuania
Baltic Cup
First place	Lithuania 1930
First place	Estonia 1935
Second place	Latvia 1932
Third place	Estonia 1928
Third place	Latvia 1929
Third place	Estonia 1931
- * Club domestic league appearances and goals

Antanas Lingis (26 December 1905 – 6 June 1941) was a Lithuanian footballer who played as a forward for LFLS Kaunas and the Lithuania national team.

== International games ==
The first match he played for Lithuania was on 25 July 1928, a 3–0 loss against Latvia. His last cap was on 11 June 1938, a 2–0 loss against Estonia.

International Games
#	Date	Venue	Opponent	Result	Competition	Goals
1	25 July 1928	Tallinn, Estonia	Latvia	0:3	1928 Baltic Cup	
2	26 July 1928	Tallinn, Estonia	Estonia	0:6	1930 Baltic Cup	
3	1 September 1928	Kaunas, Lithuania	Latvia	1:1	Friendly	
4	15 August 1929	Riga, Latvia	Estonia	2:5	1929 Baltic Cup	
5	15 August 1930	Kaunas, Lithuania	Estonia	2:1	1930 Baltic Cup	1 (1)
6	17 August 1930	Kaunas, Lithuania	Latvia	3:3	1930 Baltic Cup	1 (2)
7	13 September 1930	Klajpeda, Lithuania	Estonia	4:0	Friendly	1 (3)
8	9 June 1931	Tallinn, Estonia	Estonia	1:4	Friendly	
9	26 August 1931	Kaunas, Lithuania	Romania	2:4	Friendly	
10	30 August 1931	Tallinn, Estonia	Estonia	0:2	1931 Baltic Cup	
11	31 August 1931	Tallinn, Estonia	Latvia	0:1	1931 Baltic Cup	
12	29 June 1932	Kaunas, Lithuania	Latvia	2:3	Friendly	1 (4)
13	24 July 1932	Liepaja, Latvia	Latvia	1:2	Friendly	1 (5)
14	6 August 1932	Kaunas, Lithuania	Estonia	1:0	Friendly	
15	28 August 1932	Riga, Latvia	Latvia	1:4	Friendly	
16	29 August 1932	Riga, Latvia	Estonia	2:1	1932 Baltic Cup	1 (6)
17	11 September 1932	Kaunas, Lithuania	Latvia	1:0	1932 Baltic Cup	1 (7) (Lithuania Record)
18	25 September 1932	Stockholm, Sweden	Sweden	1:8	1932 Baltic Cup	
19	29 June 1933	Kaunas, Lithuania	Sweden	0:2	FIFA World Cup Qualification	
20	20 July 1933	Tallinn, Estonia	Estonia	1:2	Friendly	
21	9 August 1933	Helsinki, Finland	Finland	2:9	Friendly	
22	4 September 1933	Kaunas, Lithuania	Latvia	2:2	1933 Baltic Cup	1 (8) (Lithuania Record)
23	29 June 1934	Kaunas, Lithuania	Estonia	1:1	Friendly	
24	16 August 1934	Kaunas, Lithuania	Finland	1:0	Friendly	
25	30 May 1935	Riga, Latvia	Latvia	1:6	Friendly	
26	19 June 1935	Tallinn, Estonia	Estonia	2:2	Friendly	
27	20 August 1935	Tallinn, Estonia	Estonia	2:1	1935 Baltic Cup	1 (9) (Lithuania Record)
28	21 August 1935	Tallinn, Estonia	Latvia	2:2	1935 Baltic Cup	1 (10) (Lithuania Record)
29	8 September 1935	Kaunas, Lithuania	Latvia	2:2	Friendly	1 (11) (Lithuania Record)
30	18 September 1935	Kaunas, Lithuania	Estonia	2:2	Friendly	1 (12) (Lithuania Record)
31	14 June 1936	Kaunas, Lithuania	Latvia	1:5	Friendly	
32	29 July 1937	Riga, Latvia	Latvia	2:4	FIFA World Cup Qualification	
33	11 June 1938	Kaunas, Lithuania	Estonia	0:2	Friendly	

== Honors ==
For Lithuania, he scored 12 goals in 33 appearances, which at the time was the record number of goals scored by an individual player for Lithuania which was set in 1932 and wasn’t beaten until 2007.

At club level, Lingis won the Lithuanian A Lyga four times between 1922-1932 with LFLS Kaunas.
