= Ēriks Pētersons =

Latvian footballer and hockey player (1909–1987)

Personal information
- Full name: Ēriks Pētersons
- Date of birth: 7 October 1909
- Place of birth: Riga, Latvia
- Date of death: 29 June 1987 (aged 77)
- Place of death: Michigan, United States of America
- Position: Forward

Senior career*
Years	Team	Apps	(Gls)
1929-1940	Rīgas FK		

International career
1929-1939	Latvia	63	(21)
- * Club domestic league appearances and goals

Ēriks Pētersons (1909–1987) was a Latvian footballer and ice hockey player. Between 1929 and 1939 he played 63 international matches and scored 21 goals for Latvian national team. He also played in the Latvian national ice hockey team, where he appeared in eight matches. After World War II Pētersons moved to United States.

== Biography ==
Ēriks Pētersons was first noticed in 1928 when he moved from a third league team directly to the strongest football club in Latvia, Rīgas FK. He started as a center forward but soon changed his position on the field to central midfield in which he still retained his goal scoring abilities. All his career Pētersons played for a single club, RFK. He was the most capped Latvia international footballer before World War II, participating in 63 of the total 99 matches Latvia played in this time period. He was also the country's best international goalscorer of the 20th century. In 2007, Māris Verpakovskis overtook him in the all-time Latvia scoring list. His last football match in Latvia was in the 1939–1940 season against Olimpija Liepāja as he did not play either during the first Soviet, or the German occupation of Latvia. After the war, Pētersons moved to the United States where he played for the Swedish football club Chicago Viking. In 2006 Pētersons was selected as one of the 11 greatest Latvian footballers of the 20th century and is considered by many the all-time best Latvian footballer.

== International Goals ==
Scores and results list Latvia's goal tally first, score column indicates score after each Pētersons goal.

List of international goals scored by Ēriks Pētersons
No.	Date	Venue	Opponent	Score	Result	Competition	Ref.
1	15 September 1929	Töölön Pallokenttä, Helsinki, Finland	Finland	1-3	1-3	Friendly	
2	4 August 1930	Jānis Skredelis' stadium, Riga, Latvia	Finland	1-0	3-0	Friendly	
3	16 August 1930	Makabi Stadionas, Kaunas, Lithuania	Estonia	1-0	3-2	1930 Baltic Cup	
4	17 August 1930	Kariuomenės Stadionas, Kaunas, Lithuania	Lithuania	1-1	3-3	1930 Baltic Cup	
5	17 August 1930	Kariuomenės Stadionas, Kaunas, Lithuania	Lithuania	2-2	3-3	1930 Baltic Cup	
6	17 August 1930	Kariuomenės Stadionas, Kaunas, Lithuania	Lithuania	3-2	3-3	1930 Baltic Cup	
7	30 June 1931	L.S.B. Stadions, Riga, Latvia	Lithuania	1-0	5-2	Friendly	
8	30 June 1931	L.S.B. Stadions, Riga, Latvia	Lithuania	2-0	5-2	Friendly	
9	30 June 1931	L.S.B. Stadions, Riga, Latvia	Lithuania	3-2	5-2	Friendly	
10	30 June 1931	L.S.B. Stadions, Riga, Latvia	Lithuania	4-2	5-2	Friendly	
11	31 August 1931	Kadriorg Stadium, Tallinn, Estonia	Lithuania	1-0	1-0	1931 Baltic Cup	
12	24 June 1932	Stadions Olimpija, Liepāja, Latvia	Lithuania	1-0	2-1	Friendly	
13	28 August 1932	Jānis Skredelis' stadium, Riga, Latvia	Lithuania	1-1	4-1	1932 Baltic Cup	
14	28 May 1933	Jānis Skredelis' stadium, Riga, Latvia	Estonia	2-0	2-0	Friendly	
15	12 June 1933	Jānis Skredelis' stadium, Riga, Latvia	Lithuania	1-0	6-2	Friendly	
16	12 June 1933	Jānis Skredelis' stadium, Riga, Latvia	Lithuania	4-2	6-2	Friendly	
17	12 June 1933	Jānis Skredelis' stadium, Riga, Latvia	Lithuania	5-2	6-2	Friendly	
18	4 July 1933	Jānis Skredelis' stadium, Riga, Latvia	Sweden	1-1	1-1	Friendly	
19	4 September 1933	Kariuomenės Stadionas, Kaunas, Lithuania	Lithuania	1-1	2-2	1933 Baltic Cup	
20	4 September 1933	Kariuomenės Stadionas, Kaunas, Lithuania	Lithuania	2-2	2-2	1933 Baltic Cup	
21	22 August 1935	Kadriorg Stadium, Tallinn, Estonia	Estonia	1-1	1-1	1935 Baltic Cup	
22	8 September 1935	Kariuomenės Stadionas, Kaunas, Lithuania	Lithuania	2-2	2-2	Friendly	
23	15 September 1935	Stadion Miejski im. Władysława Króla, Łódź, Poland	Poland	2-0	3-3	Friendly	
24	6 September 1936	Jānis Skredelis' stadium, Riga, Latvia	Poland	3-1	3-3	Friendly	
