= 1928 Baltic Cup =

International football competition

Tournament details
- Host country: Estonia
- Dates: 25–27 July
- Teams: (from UEFA confederations) (from BFA sub-confederations) (from EJL, LFF, LFF associations)
- Venue(s): 1 (in 1 host city)

Final positions
- Champions: Latvia (1st title)
- Runners-up: Estonia
- Third place: Lithuania

Tournament statistics
- Matches played: 3
- Goals scored: 10 (3.33 per match)
- Attendance: 12,000 (4,000 per match)
- Top scorer(s): (Estonia) Arnold Pihlak (3 goals)

The 1928 Baltic Cup was held in Tallinn at Kadrioru Stadium on 25–27 July 1928. It was the first time three Baltic countries — Estonia, Latvia and Lithuania — came together to play a friendly tournament and determine the best team amongst them. Latvia won the tournament, beating both opponents.

== Results ==
Team	Pld	W	D	L	GF	GA	GD	Pts
Latvia	2	2	0	0	4	0	+4	4
Estonia	2	1	0	1	6	1	+5	2
Lithuania	2	0	0	2	0	9	–9	0

25 July 1928
18:30 (+2:00)

Latvia	3 – 0	Lithuania
Pavlovs 2'; Vaters 25', 66'	Report

Kadrioru Stadium, Tallinn
Attendance: 2,000
Referee: Gustaf Ekberg (Sweden)
26 July 1928
18:30 (+2:00)

Estonia	6 – 0	Lithuania
Pihlak 1' (pen.), 21', 57'; Räästas 14'; Maurer 74', 78'	Report

Kadrioru Stadium, Tallinn
Attendance: 5,000
Referee: Gustaf Ekberg (Sweden)
27 July 1928
18:30 (+2:00)

Estonia	0 – 1	Latvia
	Report	63' Tauriņš

Kadrioru Stadium, Tallinn
Attendance: 5,000
Referee: Gustaf Ekberg (Sweden)

1928 Baltic Cup winner

Latvia
First title

== Statistics ==
=== Goalscorers ===
There were 10 goals scored in 3 matches, for an average of 3.33 goals per match.

3 goals

- (Estonia) Arnold Pihlak

2 goals

- (Estonia) Artur Maurer
- (Latvia) Alberts Vaters

1 goal

- (Latvia) Arkādijs Pavlovs
- (Latvia) Arnolds Tauriņš
- (Estonia) Helmuth Räästas
