= Tartu PK Olümpia =

Association football club in Estonia

Tartu Olümpia
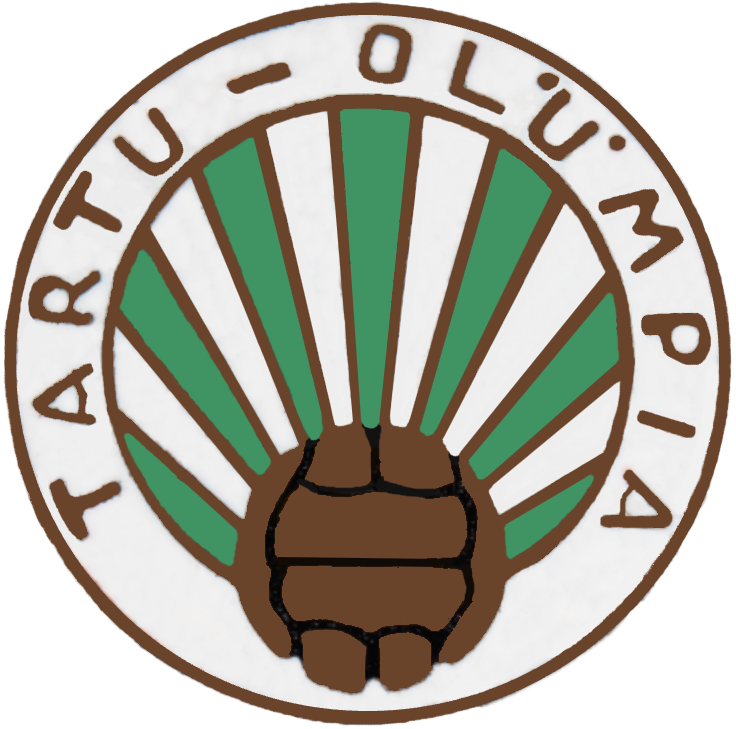
- Full name: Tartu Palliklubi Olümpia
- Founded: 1930; 95 years ago
- Dissolved: 1941; 2010
- Ground: Tamme Stadium
- Capacity: 2,000
Home colours

Tartu Palliklubi Olümpia, or simply Tartu Olümpia, is a defunct Estonian football club based in Tartu. Founded in 1930, they became the first and so far only club outside of capital city Tallinn to be crowned Estonian champions in football, after winning the title in the 1939–40 season.

The club was closed down in 1941 due to Soviet occupation of Estonia. Tartu Olümpia was re-established in 2005 as a youth club, but was dissolved again in 2010.

== History ==
=== Early history (1930–1937) ===
Tartu Palliklubi Olümpia was founded in 1930 by a group of football enthusiasts and businessmen with the aim to 'resurrect' Tartu's football, as although being the second biggest city in the country, Tartu had only been represented in the top division twice before 1930 (Tartu ASK in 1923 and Tartu JK in 1929).

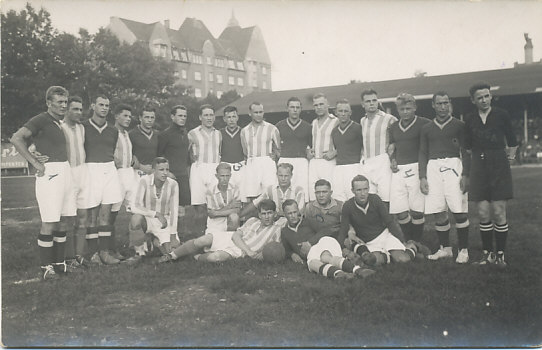
Tartu Olümpia in Riga in 1932

The club entered Estonian third division in 1931, were crowned the southern Estonian champions the following year and were promoted to the Estonian Championship in 1934. Olümpia finished their inaugural top flight season in last place, but avoided relegation due to league expansion. The club failed to win a single match the following season and were relegated.

=== Estonian champions (1938–1941) ===
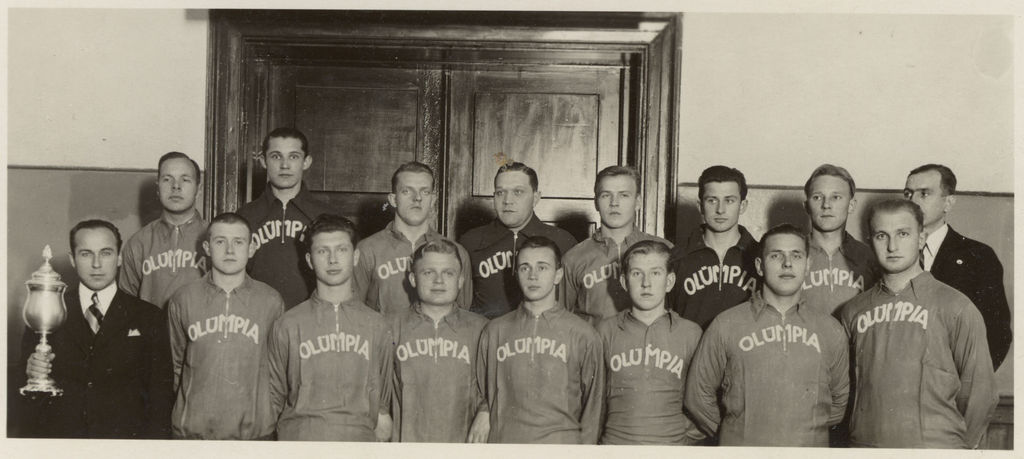
The club with the 1937 second division title

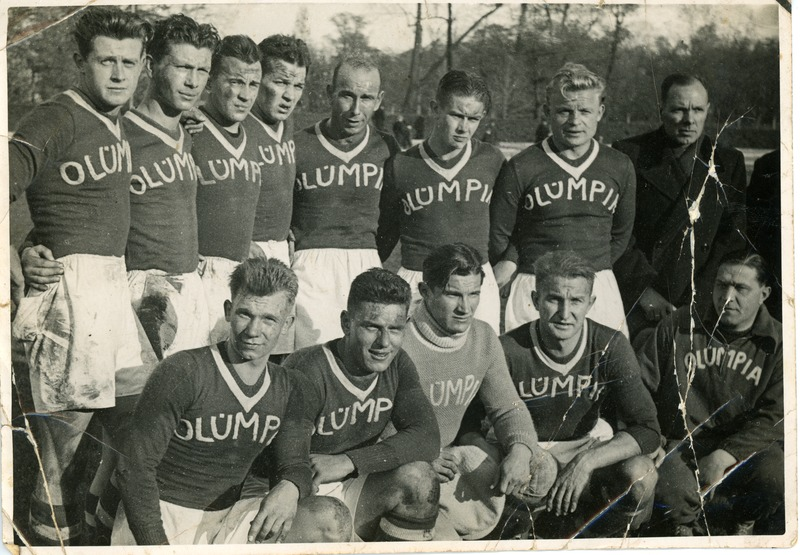
Tartu Olümpia during their triumphant 1939–40 season

Tartu Olümpia rose back to the top flight for the 1938/39 season and finished in sixth place, only a point away from the third placed VS Sport. Backed by Tartu department store owner Karl Jänes, the club strengthened their team with several Estonian internationals for the following year. Olümpia began the 1939–40 season with a 0–3 loss to Sport, but went on to win all of the following games and were crowned the Estonian champions after defeating Kalev 3–1 in the final matchday, with captain Richard Kuremaa scoring 13 goals throughout the season. In the process, Tartu Olümpia became the first club outside of capital city Tallinn to lift the Estonian Football Championship title, and have remained to be the only non-Tallinn club to do so until present day.

Tartu Olümpia was closed down in 1941 following the Soviet occupation of Estonia.

Tartu Olümpia's name briefly reappeared in Estonian football in 2005, when a youth club named FC Tartu Olümpia was established. The club ceased its activities after the 2010 season. Despite its short period of existence, several graduates, namely Sten Reinkort and Frank Liivak, later reached the Estonian national team.

== Honours ==
=== League ===
- Estonian Championship
  - Winners (1): 1939–40

== Seasons and statistics ==
| Season | Division | Pos | Pld | W | D | L | GF | GA | GD | Pts | Top goalscorer | Cup |
|---|---|---|---|---|---|---|---|---|---|---|---|---|
| 1932 | B Division | 2 | 2 | 1 | 1 | 0 | 8 | 4 | +4 | 3 | | |
| 1933 | B Division | 1 | 3 | 1 | 2 | 0 | 4 | 2 | +2 | 4 | | |
| 1934 | Top Division | 6 | 10 | 1 | 1 | 8 | 7 | 32 | –25 | 3 | | |
| 1935 | Top Division | 8 | 7 | 0 | 2 | 5 | 5 | 24 | –19 | 2 | | |
| 1936 | B Division | | | | | | | | | | | |
| 1937 | B Division | | | | | | | | | | | |
| 1938 | B Division | 1 | 4 | 4 | 0 | 0 | 18 | 2 | +16 | 8 | | |
| 1938–39 | Top Division | 6 | 14 | 7 | 0 | 7 | 22 | 36 | –14 | 14 | (Estonia) Otto Lõhmus (7) | Quarter-finals |
| 1939–40 | Top Division | 1 | 14 | 9 | 4 | 1 | 39 | 14 | +25 | 22 | (Estonia) Richard Kuremaa (13) | Quarter-finals |
