= 1935 Estonian Football Championship =

Estonian Championship
- Season: 1935
- Champions: JS Estonia Tallinn
- Relegated: PK Olümpia Tartu
- Matches played: 28
- Goals scored: 100 (3.57 per match)
- Top goalscorer: Valter Mäng (7)
- Biggest home win: Estonia 8–0 Puhkekodu
- Biggest away win: Olümpia 1–8 Kalev
- Highest scoring: Olümpia 1–8 Kalev

The 1935 Estonian Football Championship was the 15th official football league season in Estonia. Eight teams, five from Tallinn, one from Pärnu, Narva and Tartu, took part in the league. JS Estonia Tallinn successfully defended the title, winning the league for the second time in their short history.

== League table ==
Pos	Team	Pld	W	D	L	GF	GA	GD	Pts
1	JS Estonia Tallinn (C)	7	6	1	0	26	3	+23	13
2	VVS Puhkekodu Tallinn	7	4	1	2	11	14	−3	9
3	Tallinna Jalgpalliklubi	7	3	2	2	15	8	+7	8
4	VS Sport Tallinn	7	3	2	2	7	8	−1	8
5	ESS Kalev Tallinn	7	2	2	3	16	13	+3	6
6	SS Tervis Pärnu	7	2	2	3	10	15	−5	6
7	KS Võitleja Narva	7	2	0	5	10	15	−5	4
8	PK Olümpia Tartu (R)	7	0	2	5	5	24	−19	2

(C) Champions; (R) Relegated

== Results ==
Home \ Away	EST	PUH	TJK	VSS	KAL	TER	VÕI	OLÜ
Estonia		8–0	1–0	2–0	3–1	6–0	5–1	1–1
Puhkekodu			3–0	1–2	2–2	2–1	1–1 (Note: The two points from the match between Puhkekodu and Võitleja (1–1) were credited to Puhkekodu.)	2–0
Tallinna JK				0–0	4–1	2–2	4–1	5–0
VS Sport					2–1	2–0	0–3	1–1
ESS Kalev						1–1	2–0	8–1
Tervis							2–1	4–1
Võitleja								3–1
Olümpia Tartu								

== Top scorers ==
Pos	Name	Team	Gls
1	Valter Mäng	JS Estonia Tallinn	7
2	Richard Kuremaa	Tallinna Jalgpalliklubi	6
3	Martin Jensen	JS Estonia Tallinn	5
3	Nikolai Linberg	JS Estonia Tallinn	5
3	Roman Mõtlik	VVS Puhkekodu Tallinn	5
6	Johannes Niks	ESS Kalev Tallinn	4
6	Valter Biiber	KS Võitleja Narva	4
