= Ruslans Mihaļčuks =

Latvian footballer

Personal information
- Full name: Ruslans Mihaļčuks
- Date of birth: 10 August 1976 (age 50)
- Place of birth: Riga, Latvian SSR; Soviet Union
- Height: 1.68 m (5 ft 6 in)
- Position: Midfielder

Team information
- Current team: FK Daugava Daugavpils

Senior career*
Years	Team	Apps	(Gls)
2000–2001	FK Daugava Riga	53	(3)
2003–2004	FK Jurmala	34	(23)
2004	FK Ekranas	12	(0)
2005	FK Jurmala	11	(0)
2005	FK Ventspils	5	(0)
2006	FK Ekranas	33	(2)
2007	FK Daugava Daugavpils	0	(0)
2008	FK Liepājas Metalurgs	?	(?)
2009–	FK Daugava Daugavpils	?	(?)

International career
2004–2005	Latvia	2	(0)
- * Club domestic league appearances and goals

Ruslans Mihaļčuks (born 10 August 1976, in Riga) is a football midfielder from Latvia who plays for FK Daugava Daugavpils in the Latvian First League.
