= 1931 Baltic Cup =

International football competition

Tournament details
- Host country: Estonia
- Dates: 30 August – 1 September
- Venue(s): 1 (in 1 host city)

Final positions
- Champions: Estonia (2nd title)
- Runners-up: Latvia
- Third place: Lithuania

Tournament statistics
- Matches played: 3
- Goals scored: 7 (2.33 per match)
- Attendance: 12,700 (4,233 per match)
- Top scorer(s): (Estonia) Eduard Ellman-Eelma (Estonia) Friedrich Karm (2 goals)

The 1931 Baltic Cup was held in Tallinn, Estonia at Kadrioru staadion from 30 August to 1 September 1931. It was the fourth time three Baltic countries — Estonia, Latvia and Lithuania — came together to play a friendly tournament and determine the best team amongst them. Estonia won the tournament, beating both opponents.

This was the first time the competition was known as the Baltic Cup.

== Results ==
Team	Pld	W	D	L	GF	GA	GD	Pts
Estonia	2	2	0	0	5	1	+4	4
Latvia	2	1	0	1	2	3	–1	2
Lithuania	2	0	0	2	0	3	–3	0

30 August 1931
17:30 (+2:00)

Estonia	2 – 0	Lithuania
Ellman-Eelma 13'; Kass 50'	Report

Kadrioru staadion, Tallinn
Attendance: 4,200
Referee: Osborn Wenzel (Sweden)
31 August 1931
17:30 (+2:00)

Latvia	1 – 0	Lithuania
Pētersons 11'	Report

Kadrioru staadion, Tallinn
Attendance: 2,000
Referee: Osborn Wenzel (Sweden)
1 September 1931
17:30 (+2:00)

Estonia	3 – 1	Latvia
Ellman-Eelma 10'; Karm 51', 67'	Report	16' Škincs

Kadrioru staadion, Tallinn
Attendance: 6,500
Referee: Osborn Wenzel (Sweden)

1931 Baltic Cup winner

Estonia
Second title

== Scorers ==
2 goals

- (Estonia) Friedrich Karm
- (Estonia) Eduard Ellman-Eelma

1 goal

- (Estonia) Leonhard Kass
- (Latvia) Ēriks Pētersons
- (Latvia) Jānis Škincs
