= Jaroslavas Citavičius =

Lithuanian footballer

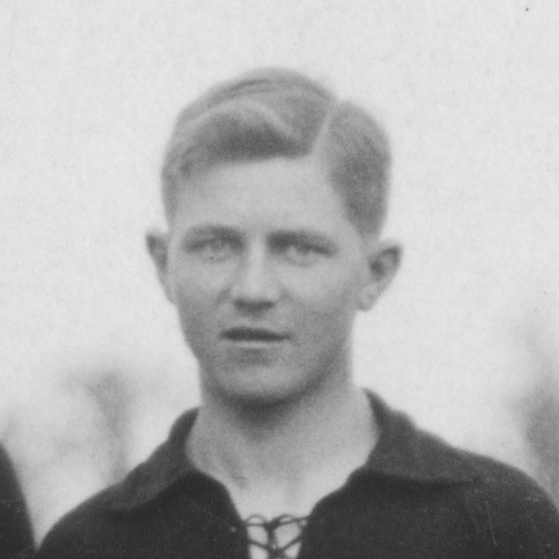
- Citavičius in 1927

Personal information
- Full name: Jaroslavas Citavičius
- Date of birth: March 22, 1907
- Date of death: March 2, 1972 (aged 64)
- Position: Striker

Jaroslavas Citavičius (March 22, 1907 – March 2, 1972) was a Lithuanian football player who played as a striker. Citavičius remains to be one of the top goal scorers for Lithuania with eight goals.

== Club career ==
Citavičius was a prolific striker who played for ŠŠ Kovas Kaunas and LFLS Kaunas.

== International career ==
Citavičius remains to one the highest scoring players for Lithuania. In the 24 appearances he made for Lithuania, he managed to score 8 goals.

International Goals
#	Date	Venue	Opponent	Result	Competition
1	15 August 1930	Kaunas, Lithuania	Estonia	2:1	1930 Baltic Cup
2	17 August 1930	Kaunas, Lithuania	Latvia	3-3	1930 Baltic Cup
3	30 June 1931	Riga, Latvia	Latvia	5:2	Friendly
4	29 June 1932	Kaunas, Lithuania	Latvia	2:3	Friendly
5	6 August 1932	Kaunas, Lithuania	Estonia	1:0	Friendly
6	28 August 1932	Riga, Latvia	Latvia	4:1	1932 Baltic Cup
7	20 July 1933	Tallinn, Estonia	Estonia	2:1	Friendly
8	2 September 1933	Kaunas, Lithuania	Estonia	1:1	1933 Baltic Cup
