= 1934 Estonian Football Championship =

Estonian Championship
- Season: 1934
- Champions: JS Estonia Tallinn (1st title)
- Relegated: —
- Matches played: 30
- Goals scored: 99 (3.3 per match)
- Top goalscorer: Karl-Richard Idlane (8)
- Biggest home win: Sport 7–0 Kalev
- Biggest away win: Olümpia 0–4 Jalgpalliklubi; Kalev 0–4 Puhkekodu
- Highest scoring: Sport 7–1 Olümpia

The 1934 Estonian Football Championship was the 14th official football league season in Estonia. Six teams took part in the league, five from Tallinn and one from Tartu. Each team played every opponent twice, once at home and once on the road, for a total of 10 games. JS Estonia Tallinn won the league for the first time in the club's history. None of the teams were relegated, as the league expanded to eight teams in the next season.

== League table ==
| Pos | Team | Pld | W | D | L | GF | GA | GD | Pts |
|---|---|---|---|---|---|---|---|---|---|
| 1 | JS Estonia Tallinn (C) | 10 | 7 | 3 | 0 | 22 | 3 | +19 | 17 |
| 2 | VS Sport Tallinn | 10 | 7 | 1 | 2 | 23 | 5 | +18 | 15 |
| 3 | VVS Puhkekodu Tallinn | 10 | 4 | 3 | 3 | 19 | 11 | +8 | 11 |
| 4 | Tallinna Jalgpalliklubi | 10 | 4 | 3 | 3 | 19 | 13 | +6 | 11 |
| 5 | ESS Kalev Tallinn | 10 | 1 | 1 | 8 | 9 | 35 | −26 | 3 |
| 6 | PK Olümpia Tartu | 10 | 1 | 1 | 8 | 7 | 32 | −25 | 3 |

(C) Champions

== Results ==
| Home \ Away | KAL | EST | OLÜ | PUK | TJK | VSS |
|---|---|---|---|---|---|---|
| ESS Kalev | | 0–6 | 0–1 | 0–4 | 3–3 | 0–2 |
| Estonia | 4–0 | | 1–1 | 1–1 | 2–0 | 2–0 |
| Olümpia Tartu | 2–5 | 0–3 | | 1–5 | 0–4 | 0–3 |
| Puhkekodu | 2–0 | 1–1 | 2–1 | | 1–2 | 0–1 |
| Tallinna JK | 4–1 | 0–1 | 2–0 | 3–3 | | 1–1 |
| VS Sport | 7–0 | 0–1 | 7–1 | 1–0 | 1–0 | |

Legend: Blue = home team win; Yellow = draw; Red = away team win.

== Top scorers ==
| Pos | Name | Team | Gls |
|---|---|---|---|
| 1 | Karl-Richard Idlane | VS Sport Tallinn | 8 |
| 2 | Richard Kuremaa | Tallinna Jalgpalliklubi | 6 |
| 2 | Roman Mõtlik | VVS Puhkekodu Tallinn | 6 |
