= Baltic Cup (football) =

Football tournament held between the national teams of Baltic states

- Founded: 1928; 98 years ago
- Region: Baltic (UEFA)
- Teams: 3 (+ possible guests)
- Current champions: Estonia (6th title)
- Most championships: Latvia (13 titles)
- 2026 Baltic Cup

The Baltic Cup (Estonian: Balti turniir, Latvian: Baltijas kauss, Lithuanian: Baltijos taurė) is an international football competition contested by the national teams of the Baltic states – Estonia, Latvia and Lithuania. Sometimes guests from the Northern Europe subregion are also invited: Finland and the Faroe Islands have participated in the event twice, Iceland's inaugural participation in 2022 culminated in a victory. The reigning champions are Estonia, who won two consecutive editions in 2024 and 2026.

It is one of the earliest national teams football tournaments in Europe after the British Home Championship, and the oldest one that is still organized. Though originally held annually, the competition has been biennial since 2008.

== History ==
Match count by location.
Green indicate where the Finals were held in a cup-format edition.

As Estonia had unofficially declared itself the Baltic football champion in 1925, 1926 and 1927 based on matches played with Finland, Latvia, Lithuania and Poland it was decided in 1928 to organize an official tournament. Though Poland and Finland were invited to join, the tournament took place between the three Baltic nations.

The tournament was intended to improve relations between the nations, but intrigues around the organization and budget questions worked against this goal. The hosts always did everything to wear out their competitors. In 1933 Lithuanian hosts surprised the officials with a tour to a local brewery in Kaunas in the morning before the Lithuania–Latvia match. The Estonian newspaper Päevaleht reported that the Finnish referee for the match was really jolly, but did a horrible job, mostly favouring the Lithuanian hosts. The rules demanded that at least two wins were necessary to win the championship. Both the Lithuania–Estonia and Lithuania–Latvia matches had been drawn, but stopped due to darkness and a lack of artificial lighting.

In the team meeting Latvia demanded that the Lithuania–Estonia match should be re-played first. Latvia was hoping for an advantage against a tired Lithuanian team in their match. Lithuania and Estonia disagreed, noting that Latvia had won their match against Estonia, so a Latvian win against Lithuania would grant the Latvians the championship and end the tournament. Consensus was not reached and the Latvian team left the same day. The championship was not awarded.

The feud led to the cancellation of the 1934 tournament, but the championship returned for the 1935. The rules were changed so that extra matches were now only held between leading teams if they were necessary for deciding on the championship.

During the Soviet occupation of the Baltic states, the Baltic Cup took place in 1940 and from 1948 to 1976 (with cancelled editions in 1951, 1953 to 1956 and 1963 to 1968) as a minor regional tournament between the Estonian, Latvian and Lithuanian SSRs, with occasional appearances by the Belarusian SSR. In 1991, the tournament was fully restored to the format as it was in the 1930s.

The 2020 tournament was postponed due to COVID-19 pandemic, and took place in 2021, similarly to UEFA Euro 2020. In 2021, for the 2020 Baltic Cup, Estonia won the Cup after a wait of 83 years.

== The trophy ==
The original silver trophy of the Baltic Cup was seized by the Soviets in 1940 and subsequently lost after reportedly being taken to Moscow. A new replica trophy was created in 1991 by Latvian sculptor Indulis Urbāns. It depicts three footballers, representing the three Baltic nations, holding a football on their shoulders akin to Atlas. After the 2010 edition, the Lithuanian FA commissioned third iteration of the trophy. The 27 kilograms (60 lb) trophy, reproducing the original's design, was created by Lithuanian sculptor Džiugas Jurkūnas, who had previously produced the "Lithuanian Footballer" statue by the National Football Academy of Lithuania.

== Results ==
Year	Host cities	Champions	Runners-up	Third place	Fourth place
1928	(Estonia) Tallinn	Latvia	Estonia	Lithuania	—N/a
1929	(Latvia) Riga	Estonia	Latvia	Lithuania	—N/a
1930	(Lithuania) Kaunas	Lithuania	Latvia	Estonia	—N/a
1931	(Estonia) Tallinn	Estonia (2)	Latvia	Lithuania	—N/a
1932	(Latvia) Riga	Latvia (2)	Lithuania	Estonia	—N/a
1933	(Lithuania) Kaunas	Champion undecided due to disagreements over match times.			—N/a
1934	Not held due to disagreements over the 1933 competition.				—N/a
1935	(Estonia) Tallinn	Lithuania (2)	Latvia	Estonia	—N/a
1936	(Latvia) Riga	Latvia (3)	Estonia	Lithuania	—N/a
1937	(Lithuania) Kaunas	Latvia (4)	Estonia	Lithuania	—N/a
1938	(Estonia) Tallinn	Estonia (3)	Latvia	Lithuania	—N/a
1939	Not held due to strained sporting relations between Latvia and Lithuania after EuroBasket 1939.				—N/a
1940–1990	Not held, similar tournament occasionally held during Soviet occupation/annexation of the Baltic states				—N/a
1991	(Lithuania) Klaipėda (Lithuania) Kretinga	Lithuania (3)	Latvia	Estonia	—N/a
1992	(Latvia) Liepāja	Lithuania (4)	Latvia	Estonia	—N/a
1993	(Estonia) Pärnu	Latvia (5)	Estonia	Lithuania	—N/a
1994	(Lithuania) Vilnius	Lithuania (5)	Latvia	Estonia	—N/a
1995	(Latvia) Riga	Latvia (6)	Lithuania	Estonia	—N/a
1996	(Estonia) Narva	Lithuania (6)	Estonia	Latvia	—N/a
1997	(Lithuania) Vilnius	Lithuania (7)	Latvia	Estonia	—N/a
1998	(Latvia) Liepāja (Estonia) Valga (Estonia) Viljandi	Lithuania (8)	Latvia	Estonia	—N/a
2001	(Latvia) Riga	Latvia (7)	Lithuania	Estonia	—N/a
2003	(Estonia) Valga (Estonia) Tallinn	Latvia (8)	Lithuania	Estonia	—N/a
2005	(Lithuania) Kaunas	Lithuania (9)	Latvia	Estonia did not participate due to scheduling conflicts.	—N/a
2008	(Latvia) Riga (Latvia) Jūrmala	Latvia (9)	Lithuania	Estonia	—N/a
2010	(Lithuania) Kaunas	Lithuania (10)	Latvia	Estonia	—N/a
2012	(Estonia) Võru (Estonia) Tartu	Latvia (10)	Finland	Estonia	Lithuania
2014	(Latvia) Ventspils (Latvia) Liepāja	Latvia (11)	Lithuania	Finland	Estonia
2016	(Lithuania) Klaipėda (Latvia) Liepāja (Estonia) Tallinn	Latvia (12)	Lithuania	Estonia	—N/a
2018	(Estonia) Rakvere (Latvia) Riga (Lithuania) Vilnius	Latvia (13)	Estonia	Lithuania	—N/a
2020	(Lithuania) Vilnius (Latvia) Riga (Estonia) Tallinn	Estonia (4)	Latvia	Lithuania	—N/a
2022	(Latvia) Riga (Lithuania) Kaunas (Estonia) Tallinn	Iceland (1)	Latvia	Estonia	Lithuania
2024	(Latvia) Liepāja (Estonia) Tallinn (Lithuania) Kaunas	Estonia (5)	Lithuania	Latvia	Faroe Islands
2026	(Lithuania) Kaunas (Estonia) Pärnu (Latvia) Riga (Estonia) Tallinn	Estonia (6)	Lithuania	Faroe Islands	Latvia

== Medal summary ==
As of 2026, excluding 1933.

Rank	Nation	Gold	Silver	Bronze	Total
1	Latvia	13	14	1	28
2	Lithuania	10	9	9	28
3	Estonia	6	6	16	28
4	Iceland	1	0	0	1
5	Finland	0	1	1	2
6	Faroe Islands	0	0	1	1
Totals (6 entries)		30	30	28	88

== Statistics ==
As of 2026. Including the 1933 tournament, but excluding the replay match played on 5 September 1933.

Rank	Team	Apps	Pld	W	D	L	GF	GA	GD	Pts
1	Latvia	31	61	30	21	10	93	54	+39	111
2	Lithuania	31	60	21	14	26	80	97	−17	75
3	Estonia	30	60	16	15	29	67	87	−20	63
4	Finland	2	4	2	1	1	5	3	+2	7
5	Faroe Islands	2	4	1	0	3	2	6	−4	3
6	Iceland	1	2	0	2	0	1	1	0	2

== Top scorers per tournament ==
Tournament	Name	Team	Goals
1928	Arnold Pihlak	Estonia	3
1929	Voldemārs Plade	Latvia	3
1929	Eugen Einman	Estonia	3
1929	Eduard Ellman-Eelma	Estonia	3
1930	Ēriks Pētersons	Latvia	4
1931	Friedrich Karm	Estonia	2
1931	Eduard Ellman-Eelma	Estonia	2
1932	Alberts Šeibelis	Latvia	2
1933	Ēriks Pētersons	Latvia	2
1935	Iļja Vestermans	Latvia	2
1935	Antanas Lingis	Lithuania	2
1936	Alberts Šeibelis	Latvia	2
1937	Iļja Vestermans	Latvia	3
1938	Ralf Veidemann	Estonia	2
1991	9 different players	–	1
1992	Virginijus Baltušnikas	Lithuania	3
1993	5 different players	–	1
1994	Valdas Ivanauskas	Lithuania	2
1995	11 different players	–	1
1996	7 different players	–	1
1997	7 different players	–	1
1998	4 different players	–	1
2001	Marians Pahars	Latvia	2
2001	Vladimirs Koļesņičenko	Latvia	2
2003	9 different players	–	1
2005	Igoris Morinas	Lithuania	2
2008	4 different players	–	1
2010	Mantas Savėnas	Lithuania	1
2010	Artūras Rimkevičius	Lithuania	1
2012	Edgars Gauračs	Latvia	3
2014	4 different players	–	1
2016	Fiodor Černych	Lithuania	2
2018	5 different players	–	1
2020	Mattias Käit	Estonia	2
2022	Sergei Zenjov	Estonia	2
2024	10 different players	–	1
2026	5 different players	–	1

== All-time top goalscorers ==
Rank	Name	Team	Goals	Tournament(s)
1	Ēriks Pētersons	Latvia	9	1930(4), 1931(1), 1932(1), 1933(2) and 1935(1)
2	Antanas Lingis	Lithuania	6	1930(2), 1932(1), 1933(1) and 1935(2)
2	Eduard Ellman-Eelma	Estonia	6	1929(3), 1931(2) and 1935(1)
2	Iļja Vestermans	Latvia	6	1935(2), 1936(1) and 1937(3)
5	Alberts Šeibelis	Latvia	5	1932(2), 1933(1) and 1936(2)
6	Arnold Pihlak	Estonia	4	1928(3) and 1929(1)
6	Eugen Einman	Estonia	4	1929(3) and 1930(1)
6	Friedrich Karm	Estonia	4	1930(2) and 1931(2)
6	Jaroslavas Citavičius	Lithuania	4	1930(2), 1932 (1) and 1933(1)
6	Virginijus Baltušnikas	Lithuania	4	1992(3) and 1995(1)
6	Marians Pahars	Latvia	4	1997(1), 1998(1) and 2001(2)
6	Igoris Morinas	Lithuania	4	1997(1), 2003(1) and 2005(2)
13	Voldemārs Plade	Latvia	3	1929(3)
13	Stepas Chmelevskis	Lithuania	3	1928(2) and 1930(1)
13	Georg Siimenson	Estonia	3	1936(1) and 1937(2)
13	Richard Kuremaa	Estonia	3	1933(1), 1936(1) and 1937(1)
13	Voldemaras Jaškevičius	Lithuania	3	1935(1), 1936(1) and 1938(1)
13	Vitālijs Astafjevs	Latvia	3	1993(1), 1994(1) and 1995(1)
13	Edgars Gauračs	Latvia	3	2012(3)
13	Mattias Käit	Estonia	3	2018(1) and 2020(2)

== Hat-tricks ==
Since the first official tournament in 1928, 4 hat-tricks have been scored in over 50 matches of the 28 editions of the tournament. The first hat-trick was scored by Arnold Pihlak of the Estonia, playing against Lithuania on 26 July 1928; and the last was by Virginijus Baltušnikas of Lithuania, playing against Latvia on 12 July 1992. No player has ever scored two hat-tricks in the Baltic Cup and no player has ever scored more than 3 goals in a single Baltic Cup match.

=== List ===
Baltic Cup hat-tricks
#	Player	G	Time of goals	For	Result	Against	Tournament	Date	FIFA report
1.	Arnold Pihlak	3	1', 21', 57'	Estonia	6–0	Lithuania	1928 Baltic Cup	26 July 1928	Report
2.	Voldemārs Plade	3	51', 68', 86'	Latvia	3–1	Lithuania	1929 Baltic Cup	14 August 1929	Report
3.	Ēriks Pētersons	3	37', 61', 64'	Latvia	3–3	Lithuania	1930 Baltic Cup	17 August 1930	Report
4.	Virginijus Baltušnikas	3	28', 31', 79'	Lithuania	3–2	Latvia	1992 Baltic Cup	12 July 1992	Report

== Other competitions ==
Competition	Edition	Champions	Runners-up	Next edition
National teams (Men's)
Baltic Cup	2026	Estonia	Lithuania	2028
Under-21 Baltic Cup	(Latvia) (Lithuania) 2026	Lithuania	Estonia	
Under-19 Baltic Cup	(Latvia) 2026	Estonia	Latvia	
Under-17 Baltic Cup	(Finland) 2026	Latvia	Finland	
Baltic Futsal Cup	(Latvia) 2021	Lithuania	Latvia	TBD
Baltic–Nordic Futsal Cup	(Denmark) 2023	Denmark	Latvia	TBD
National teams (Women's)
Women's Baltic Cup	(Lithuania) 2025	Latvia	Lithuania	(Estonia) 2026
Women's Under-19 Baltic Cup	(Latvia) 2026	Lithuania	Faroe Islands	
Women's Under-17 Baltic Cup	(Latvia) 2026	Estonia	Faroe Islands	
Women's Under-15 Baltic Cup	(Lithuania) 2026	Lithuania	Estonia	

== See also ==
- Livonia Cup: An active Supercup competition between the men's champion clubs of the Latvian and Estonian leagues.
- Baltic Champions Cup: An inactive spinoff Supercup competition featuring the men's champion clubs from all three Baltic countries.
- Women's Baltic Football League: An active competition between the top-performing women's football clubs in the Baltic region.
- Baltic League: An inactive competition between the top-performing men's football clubs in the Baltic region.
