= Johannes Niks =

Estonian footballer (1912–1997)

Johannes Niks (30 May 1912 – 31 October 1997) was an Estonian footballer who played as a forward.

He was born in Tallinn.

He began his football career when he was already an adult. His first club was Meteor. In 1935 he joined with ESS Kalev. In 1937 he scored the most goals (17) in Meistriliiga. In 1938 he played one match for Estonia national team.

In 1941 he was mobilized into Red Army. He fought at the Battle of Velikiye Luki.
