= Ralf Veidemann =

Estonian footballer (1913–2009)

Personal information
- Date of birth: 7 January 1913
- Date of death: 2 February 2009 (aged 96)

Senior career*
Years	Team	Apps	(Gls)
- Tallinna Kalev

International career
1937–1940	Estonia	13	(3)
- * Club domestic league appearances and goals

Ralf Veidemann (7 January 1913 – 2 February 2009) was an Estonian footballer. He played in 13 matches for the Estonia national football team from 1937 to 1940. He was also named in Estonia's squad for the Group 1 qualification tournament for the 1938 FIFA World Cup.
