= Pärnu JK Tervis =

Estonian football club

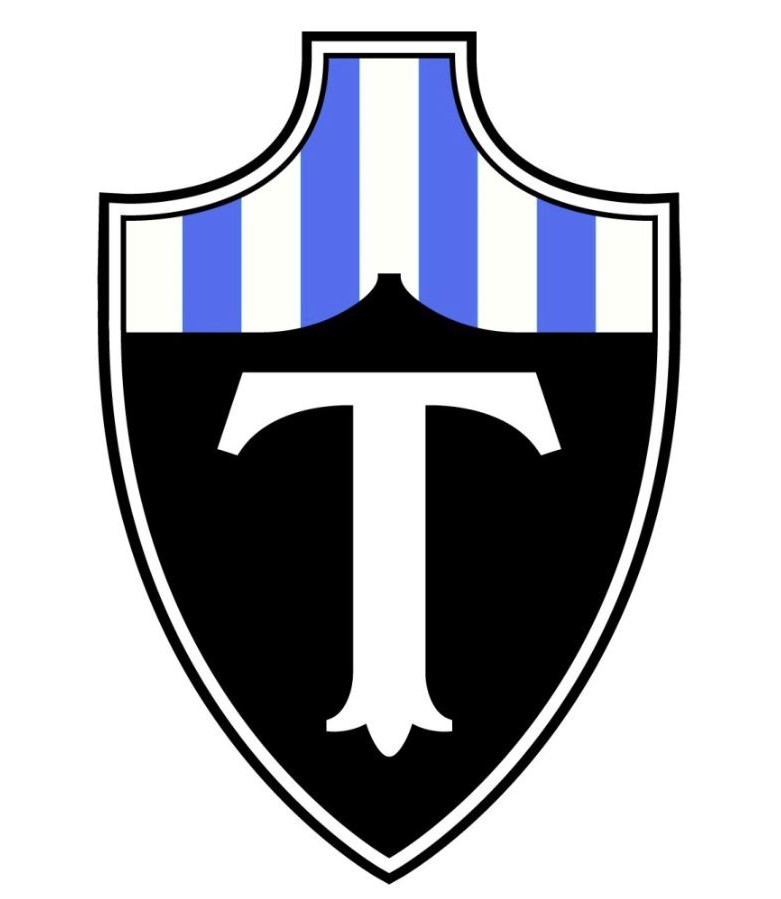
- Full name: Pärnu JK Tervis
- Founded: 11 April 1921; 104 years ago
- Ground: Raeküla Staadion, Pärnu
- Capacity: 500
- League: III Liiga
- 2022: 1st
Home colours	Away colours

Former logo

Pärnu JK Tervis is an Estonian football club from Pärnu. Founded in 1921 as Spordiselts Pärnu "Tervis", it is the oldest sports club of Pärnu. The club colors are white, black, and blue.

== History ==
Spordiselts Pärnu "Tervis" was founded on 11 April 1921 and became the first sports club in Pärnu. The early years saw weightlifting become the most popular and successful sport section in the club, with heavyweight weightlifter Arnold Luhaäär notably winning a silver medal in the 1928 Amsterdam Summer Olympics. In 1925, Tervis' football team gained promotion to the top division of Estonian football and competed in the championship until the 1928 season. Pärnu Tervis returned to top-flight football in 1935 and finished 4th in the following season, with Richard Kuremaa scoring 16 goals for the club. The club was disbanded in 1940, after the Soviet occupation of Estonia.

Pärnu Tervis was re-established in 1991, after Estonia had regained its independence. The club took part in the 1995−96 Intertoto Cup, where they notably faced Bayer 04 Leverkusen. From 1996 to 1999, the club was known as Lelle SK and played its home games in Lelle, a small borough in Kehtna Parish. After the resignation of the club's president Urmas Hanson, Pärnu Tervis was acquired by FC Flora to act as a reserve team for them. Tervis was dissolved in 2005 so that Pärnu would be represented by only local teams in the future.

In 2022, Pärnu JK Tervis was brought back to existence by former professional footballers, whom many had played for Pärnu Vaprus the previous season. The club entered the fifth tier of Estonian football.

== Pärnu Tervis in Estonian Football ==
The old yellow logo

Lelle SK logo (From 1996–1999, the club was known as Lelle SK)

Season	Level	Position	W	D	L	GD	Points
1992–93	Esiliiga	1	13	0	3	+62	26
1993–94	Meistriliiga	8	5	2	15	−29	12
1994–95	Esiliiga	2	6	1	3	+14	19
1995–96	Meistriliiga	6	5	2	7	−4	17
as Lelle SK (1996–1999)
1996–97	Meistriliiga	4	5	6	3	+4	21
1997–98	Meistriliiga	8	3	1	10	−23	10
1998	Meistriliiga	8	0	3	11	−29	3
1999	Meistriliiga	7	5	9	14	−20	24
as Pärnu JK Tervis
2000	Esiliiga	2	16	3	9	+29	51
2001	Esiliiga	8	1	0	27	−121	3
2002	3rd Division	1	15	4	1	+40	49
2003	Esiliiga	2	16	5	7	+33	51
2004	Esiliiga	3	18	2	8	+20	56
2005	Esiliiga	5	14	8	14	+20	50
Dissolved in 2005, re-established in 2022
2022	III Liiga W	1	20	1	1	+118	61

== Pärnu Tervis in Europe ==
- 1R – 1st Round

Season	Cup	Round	Country	Club	Score
1995	Intertoto Cup	1R	(Federal Republic of Yugoslavia)	FK Budućnost Podgorica	1–3
		1R	(Cyprus)	Nea Salamis Famagusta FC	0–2
		1R	(Germany)	Bayer Leverkusen	1–6
		1R	(Greece)	OFI	0–2
