= Nikolai Linberg =

Latvian-Estonian footballer

Nikolai Linberg (Latvian: Nikolajs Lindbergs; 3 April 1915 – unknown) was a Latvian-Estonian footballer.

He was born in Tallinn. In 1934, he received his Estonian citizenship.

He began his football career at the age of 17. In 1934 he joined with JS Estonia Tallinn. In 1936 in Meistriliiga, he scored 21 goals in 14 matches; this record lasted 58 years. He played also for Tallinna JK Dünamo, and Kalev. 1935–1938 he was a member of Estonia men's national football team.

In the second half of the 1940s, he disappeared.
