= Robert Keres =

Estonian basketball player

Personal information
- Born: 14 August 1907 Urvaste, Governorate of Livonia, Russian Empire
- Died: 29 October 1946 (aged 39) Freudental, Allied-occupied Germany

Career information
- College: University of Tartu

Robert Keres (14 August 1907 – 29 October 1946) was an Estonian basketball and volleyball player and track and field athlete. He was the men's basketball champion in 1934, 1936, and 1937, and 1932 and 1934 Estonian men's volleyball champion with Tartu NMKÜ.

He competed for the Estonia men's national basketball team in the 1936 Summer Olympics. He was also involved in athletics and achieved third place in the 110 metres hurdles at the Estonian Games in 1934 and won bronze in the triple jump at the Estonian Games in 1933. Later, he worked as sports correspondent for Rahvaleht and Vaba Maa.

Keres was mobilized into the German Army during World War II following the German occupation of Estonia. He died in Freudental after the war's end from wounds he suffered during combat.
