= Kalevi Aed =

Former multi-purpose stadium in Tallinn, Estonia

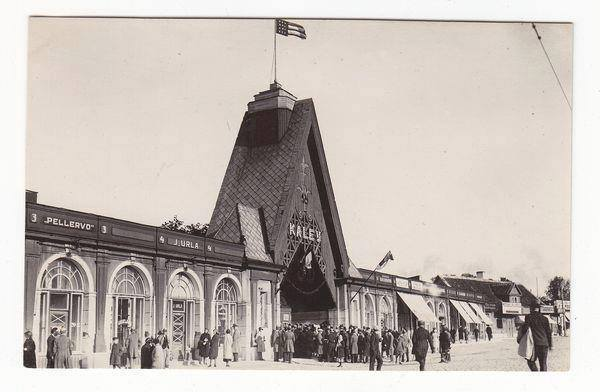
- Entrance of the Kalevi Aed
- Location: Tallinn, Estonia
- Coordinates: 59°26′9.58″N 24°45′18.94″E
- Operator: Estonian Sports Association Kalev
- Record attendance: 5,500 (Estonia vs Turkey, 19 June 1924)

Construction
- Opened: 10 June 1923; 101 years ago
- Demolished: Late 1940s
- Architect: Karl Burman

Tenants
- Tallinna Kalev (1923–1940s); Estonia national football team (1923–1925)

Kalevi Aed, also known as Kalevi spordiplats or Kalevi staadion, was a multi-purpose stadium in Tallinn, Estonia. It was the home ground of Tallinna Kalev. Today, Viru Keskus lies on the site of the former stadium.

== History ==
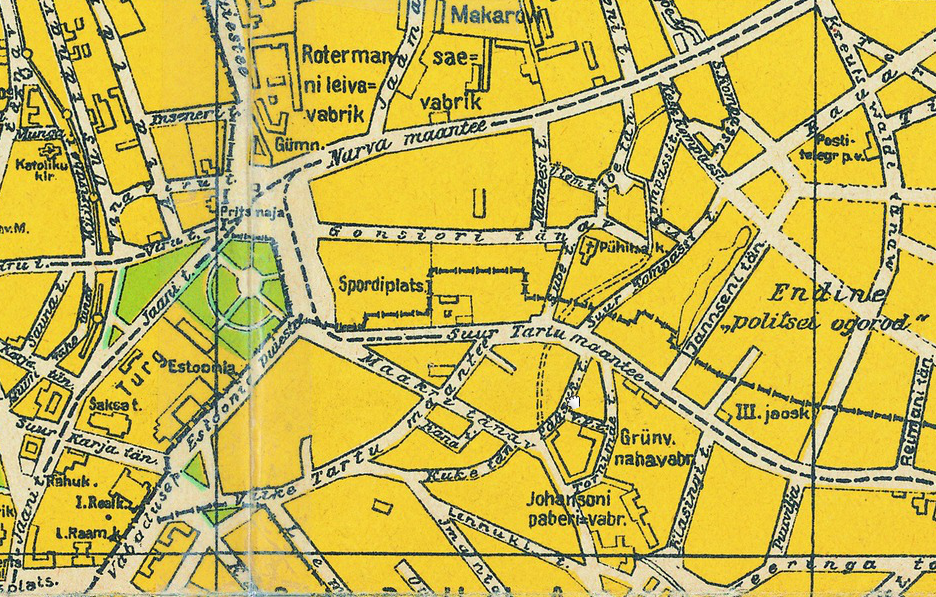
Location of the Kalevi Aed (spordiplats) on a map from 1928

The history of the Kalevi Aed starts in the 19th century, when the land was owned by Jakob Johann von Gonsior and was rented out to a singing organisation named "Lootus". In 1920, Lootus leaves the contract unextended and Kalev, who have been looking for a field to construct their stadium, takes advantage of the opportunity. On 10 June 1923, a new stadium is opened and one month later, the Estonia national football team debuts on the field, drawing 1–1 with Latvia in front of 4,000 spectators.

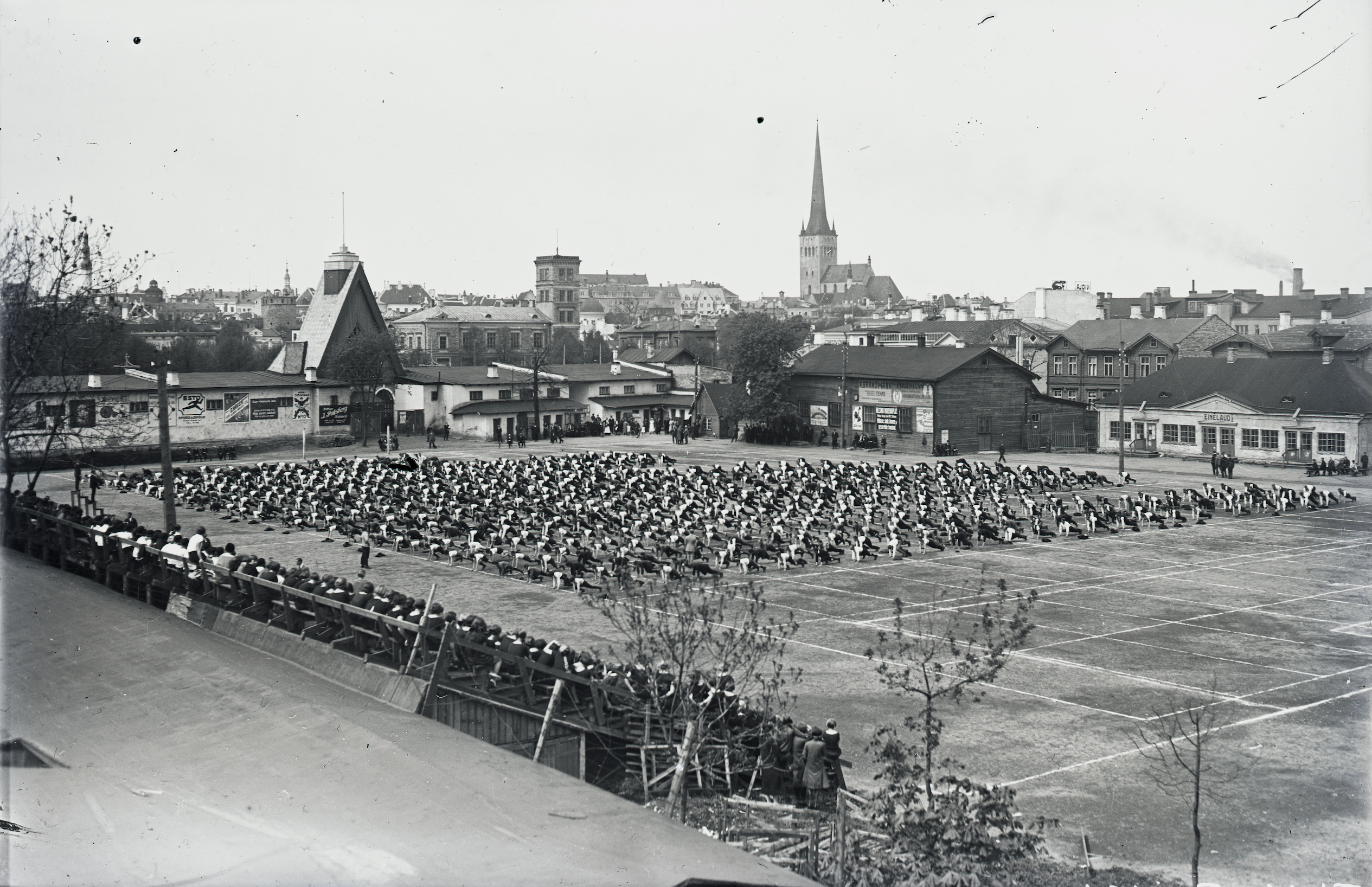
Gymnastics celebrations at Kalevi Aed in the 1930s

In the autumn of the same year, the 1923 Estonian Football Championship takes place. By the fate of the draw, Kalev faces their arch-rivals Sport in the semi-final and the highly anticipated match takes place in Kalev's new stadium Kalevi Aed. With tickets sold out, 5,000 spectators witness Kalev triumph against Sport 1–0. Kalev goes on to win the 1923 Championship. Until this day, the match holds the attendance record of the Estonian top-flight football.

In addition to football, Kalevi Aed was also used for track and field, bandy and other sporting events.

The stadium was demolished few years after World War II, in the latter part of the 1940s.

== Estonia national team matches ==
From 1923 to 1925, the stadium served as the home ground for the Estonia national football team and hosted eight official national team matches, until Kadriorg Stadium was opened in 1926.

Date		Result	Competition	Attendance
24 July 1923	Estonia – Latvia	1–1	Friendly	4,000
19 September 1923	Estonia – Russia	2–4	Friendly	4,000
25 September 1923	Estonia – Poland	1–4	Friendly	400
19 June 1924	Estonia – Turkey	1–4	Friendly	5,500
24 August 1924	Estonia – Lithuania	1–2	Friendly	3,500
5 July 1925	Estonia – Finland	2–0	Friendly	3,000
26 August 1925	Estonia – Latvia	2–2	Friendly	4,000
2 September 1925	Estonia – Poland	0–0	Friendly	3,000

== Kalevi Aed on the map ==
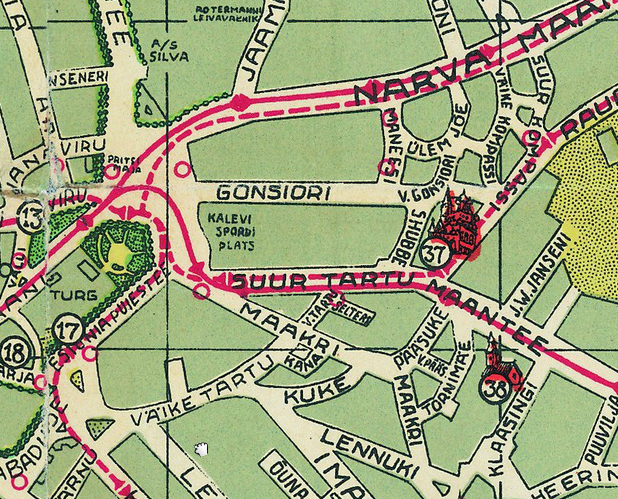
Kalevi Spordiplats on a map from 1930

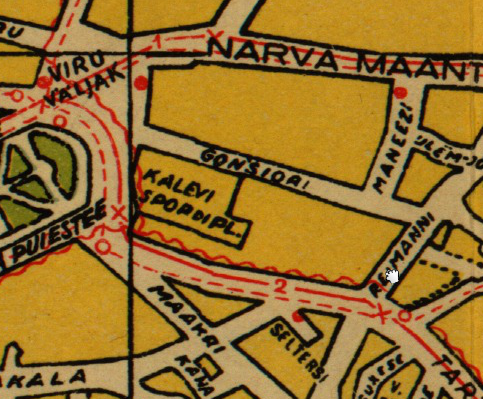
Kalevi Spordiplats on a map from 1940

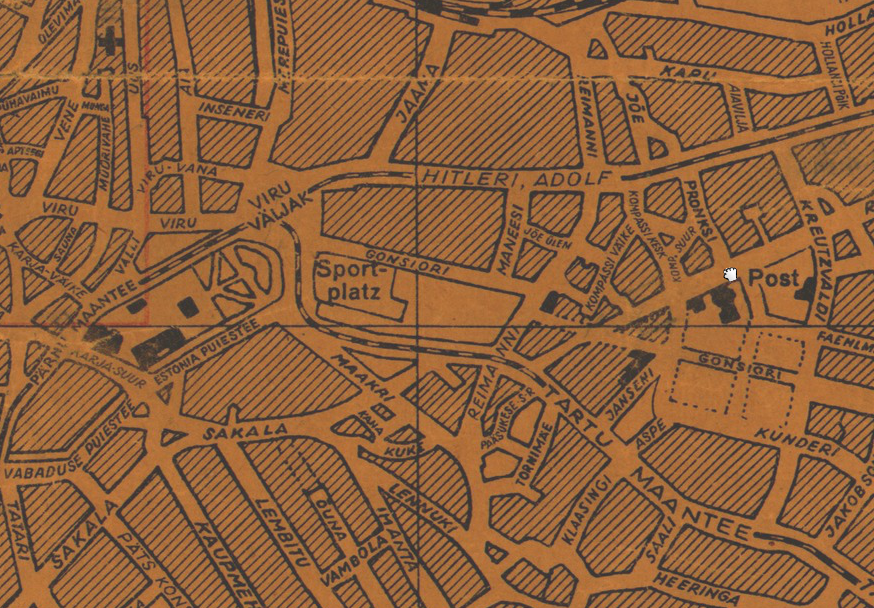
Kalevi Spordiplats on a map from 1942

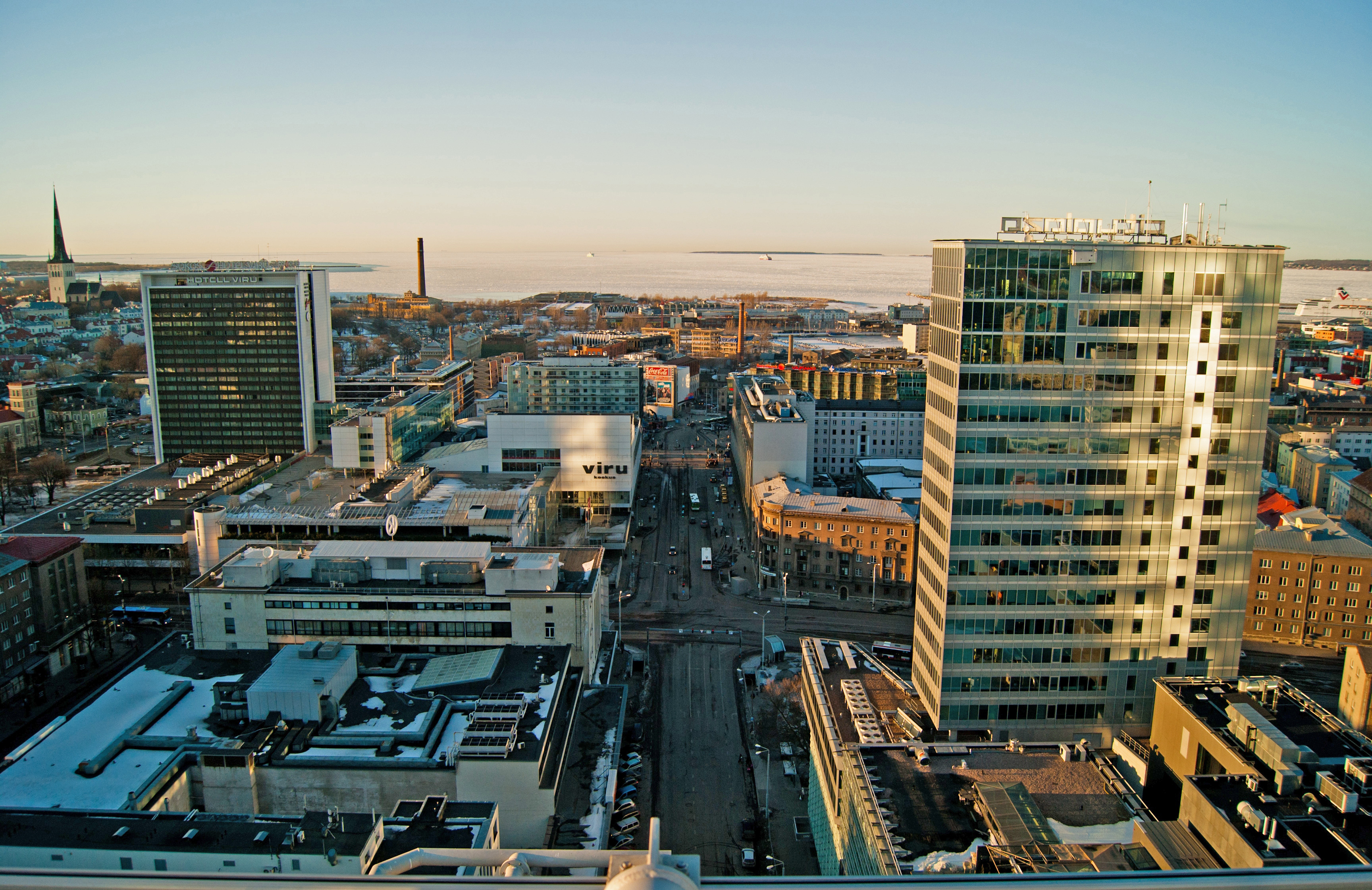
Beginning of the Gonsiori street today. The site of the former Kalevi Aed can be seen on the left, where Viru Keskus is located.
