= Sarap =

Sarap is an Estonian surname. Notable people with the surname include:

- Aavo Sarap (born 1962), Estonian football coach
- Carl Sarap (1893–1942), Estonian editor and photographer
