= August Lass =

Estonian footballer (1903–1962)

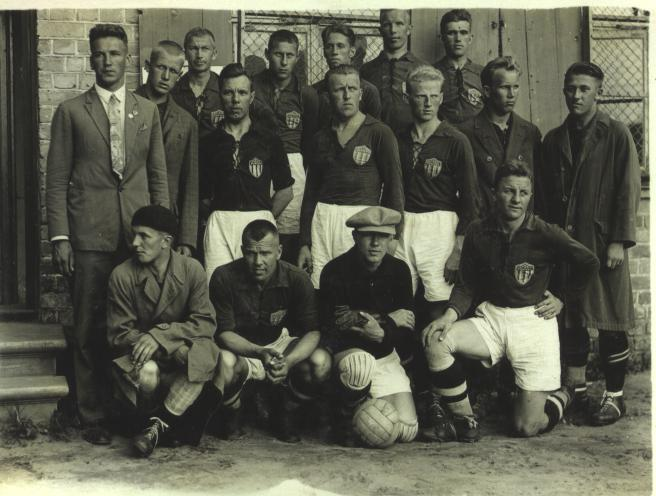

Personal information
- Date of birth: 16 August 1903
- Place of birth: Tallinn, Governorate of Estonia, Russian Empire
- Date of death: 27 November 1962 (aged 59)
- Place of death: Tallinn, then part of Estonian SSR, Soviet Union
- Position: Goalkeeper

Senior career*
Years	Team	Apps	(Gls)
1921–1925	JK Tallinna Kalev		
1925–1928	Tallinna Jalgpalliklubi		

International career
1921–1928	Estonia	21	(0)
- * Club domestic league appearances and goals

August Lass (16 August 1903 – 27 November 1962) was an Estonian footballer.

== Career ==
Lass earned 21 caps for the Estonian national team between 1921 and 1928. He played for JK Tallinna Kalev and Tallinna Jalgpalliklubi and participated at the 1924 Summer Olympics.

He became Estonian champion in 1923 with JK Tallinna Kalev, in 1926 and 1928 with Tallinna JK. He was arrested by the Soviet authorities in April 1941 and was deported to Siberia, he returned home in 1947, but in 1949-1955 he was deported again for unknown reasons.

== Honours ==
JK Tallinna Kalev

- Estonian Top Division: 1923

Tallinna JK

- Estonian Top Division: 1926, 1928
