= Ernst Joll =

Estonian footballer and journalist

Personal information
- Full name: Ernst-Aleksander Joll
- Date of birth: 8 September 1902
- Place of birth: Reval, Governorate of Estonia, Russian Empire
- Date of death: 3 April 1935 (aged 32)
- Place of death: Tallinn, Estonia
- Height: 1.73 m (5 ft 8 in)
- Position: Forward

Senior career*
| Years | Team | Apps | (Gls) |
| 1920–1924 | Kalev | | |
| 1926–1930 | Tallinna Jalgpalli Klubi | | |

International career
| 1920–1929 | Estonia | 23 | (4) |
- * Club domestic league appearances and goals

Ernst-Aleksander Joll (8 September 1902 – 3 April 1935) was an Estonian footballer and sports journalist. He was selected to represent Estonia in their first ever international match against Finland in 1920. Joll also represented Estonia at the 1924 Summer Olympics.

== Career ==
Joll was recruited to Kalev in 1920 by Eduard Hiiop. Later the same year, on 17 October 1920, Joll played as a forward in Estonia's first ever international match against Finland. He won the 1923 Estonian Championship with Kalev, becoming top scorer in the tournament. Joll was a member of the Estonia national team that competed at the 1924 Summer Olympics, losing their only game against the United States. He won two more Estonian championships with Tallinna Jalgpalli Klubi, in 1926 and 1928.

From 1921, Joll worked as a sports reporter for Päevaleht, and from 1925 as a sports editor for Rahvaleht. He died of typhus in 1935 and was buried at Rahumäe Cemetery.

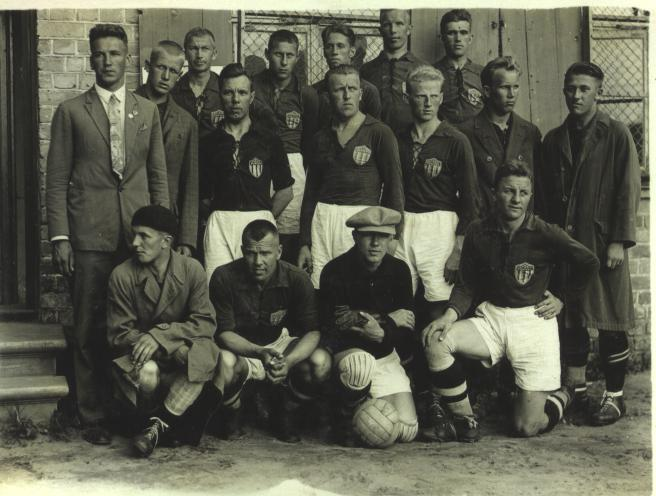
JK Kalev Tallinn in 1920s
