= Ramol Sillamaa =

Estonian footballer (born 2004)

Personal information
- Date of birth: 17 October 2004 (age 22)
- Place of birth: Tallinn, Estonia
- Height: 1.90 m (6 ft 3 in)
- Position: Winger

Team information
- Current team: Harju
- Number: 13

Senior career*
Years	Team	Apps	(Gls)
2020–2023	Kalev	65	(15)
2023–2025	Jong KAA Gent	20	(1)
2025	Šamorín	9	(0)
2025–	Harju	37	(9)
2026	→ Jönköpings Södra IF (loan)	6	(0)

International career^{‡}
2022–2023	Estonia U19	9	(0)
2024–	Estonia	1	(0)
2024–	Estonia U21	14	(1)
- * Club domestic league appearances and goals as of 16 November 2026 ‡ National team caps and goals as of 15 August 2026

Ramol Sillamaa (born 17 October 2004) is an Estonian footballer who plays as a winger for Jönköpings Södra IF, on loan from Harju and the Estonia national football team.

== Early life ==
As a youth player, Sillamaa joined the youth academy of Estonian side JK Loo.

== Club career ==
Sillamaa debuted for Estonian side Kalev at the age of fifteen years-old in 2020. He went on to appear in 45 matches in the Estonian Premium League for the club, scoring four goals and providing five assists. He joined Belgian club KAA Gent in July 2023, agreeing to a two-year professional contract having also had trials in Italy with Cagliari, SPAL and Napoli. He made his league debut for Jong KAA Gent appearing as a second-half substitute in the 60th minute in a 1–0 victory against Royal Cappellen in the Belgian Division 1.

He suffered a broken ankle shortly after the beginning of the 2024–25 season. This ruled him out of action for three months. He subsequently joined Slovak 2. Liga club FC ŠTK 1914 Šamorín in January 2025. He made his debut for the club against Zilina II in a 2–1 league victory on 3 March 2025.

He got loaned out to the Swedish club Jönköpings Södra IF in August 2026.

== International career ==
On 7 September 2023, he featured for the Estonia national under-21 football team against Bulgaria U21 in a home 1–1 draw in a UEFA European Under-21 Championship qualifying match in Tallinn.

He made his senior international debut for Estonia on 12 January 2024, starting in a 1–2 defeat to Sweden in a friendly.

== Style of play ==
Sillamaa mainly operates as a winger and is known for his speed and dribbling ability.

== Personal life ==
Sillamaa is a native of Väike-Maarja, Estonia.

== Career statistics ==
As of match played 10 February 2024

Appearances and goals by club, season and competition
Club	Season	League			National cup (Note: Includes Estonian Cup, Belgian Cup)		Continental		Total	
Club	Season	Division	Apps	Goals	Apps	Goals	Apps	Goals	Apps	Goals
Kalev	2020	Meistriliiga	6	0	0	0	—		6	0
Kalev	2021	Esiliiga	20	11	2	0	—		22	11
Kalev	2022	Meistriliiga	25	2	1	0	—		26	2
Kalev	2023	Meistriliiga	14	2	0	0	—		14	2
Kalev	Total		65	15	3	0	—		68	15
KAA Gent II	2023–24	Belgian Division 3	15	1	0	0	—		15	1
Career Totals			80	16	3	0	—		83	16
