= 2024 Meistriliiga =

Meistriliiga
- Season: 2024
- Dates: 1 March – 9 November 2024
- Champions: FCI Levadia (11th title)
- Relegated: Nõmme United
- Champions League: FCI Levadia
- Conference League: Flora; Nõmme Kalju; Paide Linnameeskond
- Matches: 180
- Goals: 539 (2.99 per match)
- Top goalscorer: Alex Matthias Tamm (28 goals)

The 2024 Meistriliiga, also known as A. Le Coq Premium Liiga due to sponsorship reasons, was the 34th season of the Meistriliiga, the top Estonian league for association football clubs since its establishment in 1992. The season began on 1 March, and concluded on 9 November 2024.

FCI Levadia won their 11th Meistriliiga title.

== Teams ==
The league consisted of ten teams; the top nine teams of the previous season, and one team promoted from the Esiliiga. Flora entered the season as defending champions.

Nõmme United were promoted as champions of the 2023 Esiliiga, replacing the bottom-placed 2023 Meistriliiga side Harju.

=== Stadiums and locations ===
Locations of the 2024 Meistriliiga teams

Team	Location	Stadium	Capacity
FCI Levadia	Tallinn	A. Le Coq Arena	14,336
Flora	Tallinn	A. Le Coq Arena	14,336
Kuressaare	Kuressaare	Kuressaare linnastaadion	1,000
Narva Trans	Narva	Narva Kreenholm Stadium	1,065
Nõmme Kalju	Tallinn	Hiiu Stadium	570
Nõmme United	Tallinn	Männiku Stadium	500
Paide Linnameeskond	Paide	Paide linnastaadion	500
Tallinna Kalev	Tallinn	Kadriorg Stadium	5,000
Tammeka	Tartu	Tartu Tamme Stadium	1,638
Vaprus	Pärnu	Pärnu Rannastaadion	1,501

=== Personnel and kits ===
Team	Manager	Captain	Kit manufacturer	Shirt sponsor
FCI Levadia	(Spain) Curro Torres	(Estonia) Rasmus Peetson	Macron	Viimsi Keevitus
Flora	(Estonia) Taavi Viik	(Estonia) Rauno Alliku	Nike	Optibet
Kuressaare	(Ukraine) Roman Kozhukhovskyi	(Estonia) Märten Pajunurm	Nike	Visit Saaremaa
Narva Trans	(Portugal) Ricardo Afonso (interim)	(Ivory Coast) Irié	Nike	Sportland
Nõmme Kalju	(Russia) Nikita Andreev	(Estonia) Henri Perk	Adidas	Marsbet
Nõmme United	(Estonia) Martin Klasen	(Estonia) Kevin Mätas	Adidas	TonyBet
Paide Linnameeskond	(Serbia) Ivan Stojković	(Estonia) Andre Frolov	Capelli	Verston
Tallinna Kalev	(Finland) Teemu Tainio	(Estonia) Tristan Toomas Teeväli	Macron	Unibet
Tammeka	(Estonia) Marti Pähn	(Estonia) Richard Aland	Nike	
Vaprus	(Estonia) Igor Prins	(Estonia) Magnus Villota	Nike	Coolbet

=== Managerial changes ===
Team	Outgoing manager	Manner of departure	Date of vacancy	Position in the table	Incoming manager	Date of appointment
Nõmme United	(Estonia) Vladimir Vassiljev	Signed by ŠTK Šamorín	26 November 2023	Pre-season	(Finland) Jani Sarajärvi	30 December 2023
Flora	(Estonia) Jürgen Henn	Resigned	3 December 2023	Pre-season	(Estonia) Norbert Hurt	7 December 2023
Nõmme United	(Finland) Jani Sarajärvi	Contract terminated	2 April 2024	10th	(Estonia) Randin Rande (Ecuador) Juan Martínez (interim)	2 April 2024
Narva Trans	(Russia) Aleksei Eremenko	Mutual consent	24 April 2024	9th	(Estonia) Valeri Bondarenko (interim)	24 April 2024
Narva Trans	(Estonia) Valeri Bondarenko	End of interim spell	6 June 2024	7th	(Portugal) Miguel Moreira	6 June 2024
Flora	(Estonia) Norbert Hurt	Resigned	11 July 2024	3rd	(Estonia) Taavi Viik	12 July 2024
Nõmme United	(Estonia) Randin Rande (Ecuador) Juan Martínez	End of interim spell	22 July 2024	10th	(Estonia) Martin Klasen	22 July 2024
Tallinna Kalev	(Estonia) Daniel Meijel	Demoted to assistant manager	1 August 2024	9th	(Finland) Teemu Tainio	1 August 2024
Narva Trans	(Portugal) Miguel Moreira	Mutual consent	7 September 2024	6th	(Portugal) Ricardo Afonso (interim)	7 September 2024

== League table ==
Pos	Team	Pld	W	D	L	GF	GA	GD	Pts	Qualification or relegation
1	FCI Levadia (C)	36	27	6	3	82	19	+63	87	Qualification for the Champions League first qualifying round
2	Nõmme Kalju	36	21	9	6	79	44	+35	72 (Note: Head to head points: Nõmme Kalju 7, Paide Linnameeskond 4.)	Qualification for the Conference League first qualifying round (Note: The 2024–25 Estonian Cup winners also qualified for the Conference League first qualifying round. Since the cup winners (Nõmme Kalju) qualified based on league position, the Conference League spot was passed to the fourth-placed team.)
3	Paide Linnameeskond	36	23	3	10	74	39	+35	72	Qualification for the Conference League first qualifying round
4	Flora	36	21	7	8	69	43	+26	70	Qualification for the Conference League first qualifying round
5	Tammeka	36	11	9	16	47	54	−7	42 (Note: Head to head points: Tammeka 9, Narva Trans 3.)	
6	Narva Trans	36	10	12	14	48	63	−15	42	
7	Vaprus	36	9	8	19	35	57	−22	35	
8	Kuressaare	36	8	10	18	46	67	−21	34	
9	Tallinna Kalev (O)	36	8	7	21	37	74	−37	31	Qualification for the Meistriliiga play-off
10	Nõmme United (R)	36	2	9	25	22	79	−57	15	Relegation to the 2025 Esiliiga

Source: Premium Liiga, Soccerway
Rules for classification: 1) Points; 2) Less matches awarded against; 3) Head-to-head points; 4) Head-to-head goal difference; 5) Matches won; 6) Goal difference; 7) Goals scored; 8) Away goals scored; 9) Fair-play points; 10) Draw
(C) Champions; (O) Play-off winners; (R) Relegated

== Results ==
Teams face each other four times (twice at home and twice away).

Home \ Away	FCI	FLO	KUR	NAR	NÕK	NÕU	PLM	TAK	TAM	VAP
FCI Levadia	—	1–0	2–0	6–0	0–0	2–0	2–0	2–2	2–1	1–1
FCI Levadia	—	4–2	0–0	0–0	3–0	1–1	1–0	4–0	3–1	3–1
Flora	1–0	—	1–0	4–3	2–2	2–0	2–0	2–2	3–1	0–1
Flora	2–1	—	3–0	3–1	3–2	1–0	1–3	5–1	2–1	3–0
Kuressaare	0–6	2–2	—	5–0	0–6	1–1	0–2	3–0	0–0	2–2
Kuressaare	0–1	3–4	—	0–1	1–2	4–1	0–2	2–1	0–0	1–1
Narva Trans	1–2	1–3	0–1	—	4–1	2–0	1–1	2–2	0–5	0–0
Narva Trans	0–2	1–1	0–2	—	2–2	2–1	0–3	2–2	0–1	1–1
Nõmme Kalju	1–5	0–0	3–0	3–0	—	1–1	2–1	2–0	4–2	4–2
Nõmme Kalju	0–4	3–0	5–1	2–2	—	3–0	2–4	3–1	3–0	2–1
Nõmme United	0–6	1–1	1–1	1–3	0–0	—	0–1	0–2	2–1	2–1
Nõmme United	0–1	0–4	2–2	0–4	0–4	—	0–4	1–1	1–2	0–2
Paide Linnameeskond	0–1	2–1	3–1	2–2	0–2	3–1	—	2–0	0–1	0–1
Paide Linnameeskond	3–0	2–1	4–3	2–3	1–1	7–2	—	3–1	2–0	1–0
Tallinna Kalev	0–2	2–3	2–2	1–0	0–2	2–0	2–5	—	1–1	3–1
Tallinna Kalev	1–2	0–3	0–3	0–1	0–2	1–0	3–2	—	1–2	1–0
Tammeka	0–3	0–0	1–2	0–2	1–1	2–1	1–2	4–0	—	1–0
Tammeka	0–3	2–0	2–1	3–3	2–3	1–1	1–3	4–1	—	0–1
Vaprus	0–2	1–3	3–2	1–4	1–2	2–1	0–3	0–1	1–1	—
Vaprus	1–4	0–1	3–1	0–0	0–4	2–0	0–1	2–0	2–2	—

Source: Soccerway
Legend: Blue = home team win; Yellow = draw; Red = away team win.

== Meistriliiga play-off ==
The ninth-placed club (Tallinna Kalev) faced the second-placed club from the 2024 Esiliiga (Viimsi) in a two-legged play-off for the final place in the 2025 Meistriliiga.

=== First leg ===
24 November 2024	Viimsi	1–1	Tallinna Kalev	Haabneeme
10:30 BST	Gohi 58'	Report	Smirnov 1'	Stadium: Viimsi Stadium; Attendance: 505; Referee: Joonas Jaanovits

=== Second leg ===
30 November 2024	Tallinna Kalev	1–0 (a.e.t.) (2–1 agg.)	Viimsi	Tallinn
10:30 BST	Nõmm 93' (o.g.)	Report		Stadium: Sportland Arena; Attendance: 650; Referee: Kristo Tohver

== Season statistics ==
=== Top scorers ===
Rank	Player	Club	Goals
1	(Estonia) Alex Matthias Tamm	Nõmme Kalju	28
2	(Estonia) Sergei Zenjov	Flora	17
3	(Nigeria) Ahmed Adebayo	Tammeka	15
3	(Estonia) Mark Anders Lepik	Flora	15
3	(Estonia) Robi Saarma	Paide Linnameeskond	15
6	(Canada) Promise David	Nõmme Kalju	14
7	(The Gambia) Abdoulie Ceesay	Paide Linnameeskond	13
8	(Estonia) Mihkel Ainsalu	FCI Levadia	11
8	(Burkina Faso) Pierre Landry Kaboré	Narva Trans	11
8	(Georgia (country)) Sergo Kukhianidze	Narva Trans	11
8	(Estonia) Ats Purje	Tallinna Kalev	11
8	(Brazil) Felipe Felicio	FCI Levadia	11

=== Hat-tricks ===
Player	For	Against	Result	Date
(Estonia) Alex Matthias Tamm	Nõmme Kalju	Kuressaare	6–0 (A)	2 March 2024
(Estonia) Mark Anders Lepik	Flora	Narva Trans	4–3 (H)	6 April 2024
(Estonia) Mark Anders Lepik	Flora	Tallinna Kalev	3–0 (A)	1 May 2024
(Brazil) Felipe Felicio	FCI Levadia	Nõmme United	6–0 (A)	19 June 2024
(Estonia) Alex Matthias Tamm	Nõmme Kalju	Tammeka	3–0 (H)	27 July 2024
(Estonia) Danil Kuraksin	Flora	Kuressaare	4–3 (A)	14 September 2024
(The Gambia) Abdoulie Ceesay^{4}	Paide Linnameeskond	Nõmme United	7–2 (H)	14 September 2024
(Estonia) Sergei Zenjov^{4}	Flora	Nõmme United	4–0 (A)	5 October 2024

Note: ^{4} – player scored 4 goals

=== Average attendance ===
Club	Average attendance
Flora	713
FCI Levadia	694
Vaprus	569
Nõmme Kalju	396
Tallinna Kalev	391
Tammeka	364
Paide Linnameeskond	309
Nõmme United	254
Narva Trans	200
Kuressaare	168
League average	406

== Awards ==
=== Monthly awards ===
Month	Player of the Month		Manager of the Month	
Month	Manager	Club	Player	Club
March	(Estonia) Alex Matthias Tamm	Nõmme Kalju	(Spain) Curro Torres	FCI Levadia
April	(Canada) Promise David	Nõmme Kalju	(Ukraine) Roman Kozhukhovskyi	Kuressaare
May	(Estonia) Mark Anders Lepik	Flora	(Estonia) Norbert Hurt	Flora
June/July	(Estonia) Alex Matthias Tamm	Nõmme Kalju	(Spain) Curro Torres	FCI Levadia
August	(Estonia) Dimitri Jepihhin	Paide Linnameeskond	(Serbia) Ivan Stojković	Paide Linnameeskond
September	(Estonia) Alex Matthias Tamm	Nõmme Kalju	(Russia) Nikita Andreev	Nõmme Kalju
October	(Estonia) Sergei Zenjov	Flora	(Serbia) Ivan Stojković	Paide Linnameeskond

=== Annual awards ===
Award	Winner	Club
Player of the Season	(Estonia) Alex Matthias Tamm	Nõmme Kalju
Goalkeeper of the Season	(Estonia) Karl Andre Vallner	FCI Levadia
Defender of the Season	(Estonia) Rasmus Peetson	FCI Levadia
Midfielder of the Season	(Estonia) Mihkel Ainsalu	FCI Levadia
Forward of the Season	(Estonia) Alex Matthias Tamm	Nõmme Kalju
Under-21 Player of the Season	(Estonia) Patrik Kristal	Paide Linnameeskond
Goal of the Season	(Ukraine) Danyl Mashchenko	Nõmme Kalju
