= Alex Tamm =

Estonian footballer (born 2001)

Personal information
- Full name: Alex Matthias Tamm
- Date of birth: 24 July 2001 (age 25)
- Place of birth: Tallinn, Estonia
- Height: 1.90 m (6 ft 3 in)
- Position: Forward

Team information
- Current team: Livingston (on loan from Olimpija Ljubljana)
- Number: 21

Youth career
- 2009–2017: Nõmme Kalju

Senior career*
Years	Team	Apps	(Gls)
2017	Nõmme Kalju III	11	(4)
2017–2021	Nõmme Kalju U21	41	(20)
2018–2025	Nõmme Kalju	153	(58)
2019–2020	→ Grasshoppers (loan)	0	(0)
2025–	Olimpija Ljubljana	25	(7)
2026–	→ Livingston (loan)	5	(0)

International career^{‡}
2017	Estonia U17	11	(2)
2018–2019	Estonia U19	10	(2)
2021–2022	Estonia U21	9	(1)
2023–	Estonia	21	(2)
- * Club domestic league appearances and goals as of 20 May 2026 ‡ National team caps and goals as of 30 March 2026

Alex Matthias Tamm (born 24 July 2001) is an Estonian professional footballer who currently plays as a forward for Livingston, on loan from Slovenian PrvaLiga club Olimpija Ljubljana and the Estonia national team.

== Club career ==
Tamm joined the youth system at Nõmme Kalju at the age of five years-old. He made his debut for the club in the Estonian Premium Liiga at the age of 16 years-old.

He won the Estonian championship with Kalju in 2018, and also won the Estonian Super Cup that year. Tamm scored Kalju's winning goal in their 1–0 UEFA Europa League win against Stjarnan in 2018. He played in 25 games and scored two goals in the Premium League prior to August 2019, when he joined Grasshopper Club Zurich in Switzerland, on a one-year loan-deal, as part of an exchange deal that saw Max Mata move to Kalju, with Tamm linking up with the Grasshoppers under-21 side.

After returning to Kalju, he scored 28 goals during the 2024 season, putting him in the running for the European Golden Shoe.

Following the end of his contract, in January 2025 he signed for Slovenian PrvaLiga club Olimpija Ljubljana on a free transfer. He scored 8 minutes into his debut match in a 5–0 win against DNŠ Ajdovščina, on 2 February 2025. He also scored and was credited with an assist in his second match, against FC Koper.

In January 2026, Tamm signed for Scottish side Livingston on loan until the end of the 2025–2026 season.

== International career ==
Tamm made his senior international debut for Estonia on 8 January 2023, in a 1–1 draw against Iceland in a friendly. The following month, he scored his first senior international goal for Estonia in a 2–1 defeat to Finland on 26 February 2023.

== Career statistics ==
=== Club ===
As of match played 13 March 2025

Appearances and goals by club, season and competition
Club	Season	League			National cup (Note: Includes Estonian Cup)		Continental		Other		Total	
Club	Season	Division	Apps	Goals	Apps	Goals	Apps	Goals	Apps	Goals	Apps	Goals
Nõmme Kalju U21	2017	Esiliiga B	15	8	—		—		—		15	8
Nõmme Kalju U21	2018	Esiliiga	22	8	—		—		—		22	8
Nõmme Kalju U21	2018	Esiliiga B	2	3	—		—		—		2	3
Nõmme Kalju U21	2021	Esiliiga B	2	1	—		—		—		2	1
Nõmme Kalju U21	Total		41	20	—		—		—		41	20
Nõmme Kalju	2018	Meistriliiga	11	1	2	5	1 (Note: Appearance(s) in UEFA Europa League)	1	—		14	7
Nõmme Kalju	2019	Meistriliiga	14	1	2	0	0	0	1 (Note: Appearance(s) in Estonian Supercup)	1	17	2
Nõmme Kalju	2020	Meistriliiga	6	1	1	3	1	0	—		8	4
Nõmme Kalju	2021	Meistriliiga	30	8	4	15	—		—		34	23
Nõmme Kalju	2022	Meistriliiga	27	12	3	4	—		—		30	16
Nõmme Kalju	2023	Meistriliiga	30	7	1	0	—		—		31	7
Nõmme Kalju	2024	Meistriliiga	34	28	3	0	—		—		37	28
Nõmme Kalju	Total		152	58	16	27	2	1	1	1	171	87
Olimpija Ljubljana	2024–25	Slovenian PrvaLiga	9	4	1	0	2 (Note: Appearance(s) in UEFA Conference League)	0	—		9	4
Olimpija Ljubljana	Total		9	4	1	0	2	0	—		9	4
Career total			202	82	17	27	4	1	1	1	224	111

=== International ===
As of match played 30 March 2026

Appearances and goals by national team and year
National team	Year	Apps	Goals
Estonia	2023	2	0
Estonia	2024	10	2
Estonia	2025	7	0
Estonia	2026	2	0
Total		21	2

Scores and results list Estonia's goal tally first, score column indicates score after each Tamm goal.

List of international goals scored by Alex Matthias Tamm
No.	Date	Venue	Opponent	Score	Result	Competition	Ref.
1	26 March 2024	Helsinki Olympic Stadium, Helsinki, Finland	Finland	1–2	1–2	Friendly	
2	8 June 2024	Lilleküla Stadium, Tallinn, Estonia	Faroe Islands	1–1	4–1	2024 Baltic Cup	

== Honours ==
Nõmme Kalju U21

- Esiliiga B: 2017

Nõmme Kalju

- Meistriliiga: 2018
- Estonian Supercup: 2019

Individual

- Meistriliiga Under-21 Player of the Season: 2022
- Meistriliiga Player of the Season: 2024
- Meistriliiga Forward of the Season: 2024
- Meistriliiga Top Scorer: 2024
- Meistriliiga Player of the Month : March 2024, June/July 2024, September 2024
