= Kaspar Laur =

Estonian footballer (born 2000)

Personal information
- Date of birth: 8 April 2000 (age 26)
- Place of birth: Tallinn, Estonia
- Height: 2.04 m (6 ft 8 in)
- Position: Centre-back

Team information
- Current team: Harju
- Number: 24

Youth career
- –2016: Tallinna JK Augur
- 2015: → Kalju (loan)
- 2017–2018: Paide Linnameeskond

Senior career*
Years	Team	Apps	(Gls)
2017–2018	Paide Linnameeskond U21	32	(5)
2018	→ Kalev U21 (loan)	9	(0)
2018	→ Kalev (loan)	25	(2)
2018–2023	Kalev U21	18	(1)
2019–2024	Kalev	149	(10)
2025–	Harju	67	(6)

International career^{‡}
2014	Estonia U15	2	(0)
2016	Estonia U17	2	(0)
2018	Estonia U19	9	(0)
2022	Estonia U21	1	(0)
2024–	Estonia	1	(0)
- * Club domestic league appearances and goals as of 17 November 2026 ‡ National team caps and goals as of 26 March 2024

Kaspar Laur (born 8 April 2000) is an Estonian football player who plays as a centre-back for Harju and the Estonia national team.

== International career ==
Laur made his debut for the senior Estonia national team on 26 March 2024 in a friendly against Finland.
