= Randin Rande =

Estonian footballer

Personal information
- Date of birth: 28 July 1997 (age 29)
- Place of birth: Tallinn, Estonia
- Position: Midfielder

Youth career
- 2007—2008: Opera JK
- 2009—2013: Nõmme United

Senior career*
| Years | Team | Apps | (Gls) |
| 2013 | Nõmme United | 9 | (2) |
| 2013—2014 | Flora III | 5 | (0) |
| 2013—2018 | Flora U21 | 88 | (15) |
| 2016—2017 | → Tammeka (loan) | 22 | (1) |
| 2016 | → Tammeka U21 (loan) | 1 | (1) |
| 2017—2018 | → Paide Linnameeskond (loan) | 25 | (2) |
| 2018 | → Paide Linnameeskond U21 (loan) | 3 | (1) |
| 2018—2021 | Nõmme United | 77 | (18) |
| 2022 | Tallinn SC ReUnited | 4 | (0) |
| 2025 | FC London | 0 | (0) |
| 2026– | Tallinna Kalev III | 11 | (6) |

International career
| 2012 | Estonia U16 | 1 | (0) |
| 2013 | Estonia U17 | 9 | (1) |
| 2014 | Estonia U18 | 2 | (0) |
| 2015 | Estonia U19 | 9 | (0) |
| 2017 | Estonia U21 | 1 | (0) |

Managerial career
- 2020–2024: Nõmme United (assistant)
- 2024: Nõmme United II
- 2024: Nõmme United (interim)
- 2024: Nõmme United (assistant)
- 2025–2026: Tallinna Kalev U21
- 2026–: Tallinna Kalev
- * Club domestic league appearances and goals as of August 18, 2026

Randin Rande (born 28 July 1997) is an Estonian manager and footballer who currently serves as head coach of Tallinna Kalev in the Esiliiga.

== Early life ==
Rande played youth football with Opera JK and Nõmme United.

== Club career ==
In 2013, Rande debuted with Nõmme United in the Estonian fourth tier.

In July 2013, he joined Flora, where he played with the second team in the second tier Esiliiga and the third team in the third tier Esiliiga. In July 2016, Rande joined Tammeka in the first tier Meistriliiga on loan. On 4 July 2017, he agreed to a mutual termination of the remainder of his loan with the club. Three days later, he was loaned to another Meistriliiga side, Paide Linnameeskond.

In July 2018, Rande joined Nõmme United in the third tier Esiliiga B. On 7 July 2020, with the team now in the second tier, he scored a brace in a 4-0 victory over Tammeka U21. In July 2021, he retired from professional football.

In the fall of 2022, he joined SC ReUnited in the Estonian fifth tier.

In 2025, he began playing with Canadian side FC London (where he works as a youth coach) in League1 Ontario.

== International career ==
Rande represented Estonia at youth level from U16 to U21.

== Coaching career ==
In 2020, he began serving as a player-assistant coach with Nõmme United. He later became a permanent assistant coach and was named head coach of the second team. In April 2024, he was named interim co-head coach (alongside Juan Martínez) of the first team, following the dismissal of Jani Sarajärvi four matches into the season, He became the fifth-youngest head coach (age 26) in the history of the Estonian first tier. He made his head coaching debut on 5 April 2024 (with Martínez listed as a team representative on the game sheet), earning the club's first ever victory in the Meistriliiga, defeating Tammeka 2-1. He held the role until mid-July, when Martin Klasen was appointed as manager, and he returned to his role as an assistant.

In November 2024, Rande moved to Canada, becoming the coach of the U16 and U17 teams of FC London.

In October 2025, he returned to Estonia, being named the head coach of JK Tallinna Kalev U21 in the Esiliiga B as well as the overall club's Director of Methodology. On 28 April 2026, he was named head coach of the JK Tallinna Kalev first team in the second-tier Esiliiga.

== Career statistics ==
As of June 25, 2025

Appearances and goals by club, season and competition
| Club | Season | League | | | National cup | | Continental | | Other | | Total | |
| Club | Season | Division | Apps | Goals | Apps | Goals | Apps | Goals | Apps | Goals | Apps | Goals |
|---|---|---|---|---|---|---|---|---|---|---|---|---|
| Nõmme United | 2013 | II liiga | 9 | 2 | 0 | 0 | — | | — | | 9 | 2 |
| Flora III | 2013 | Esiliiga B | 1 | 0 | — | | — | | — | | 1 | 0 |
| Flora III | 2014 | Esiliiga B | 4 | 0 | — | | — | | — | | 4 | 0 |
| Flora III | Total | | 5 | 0 | — | | — | | — | | 5 | 0 |
| Flora U21 | 2013 | Esiliiga | 12 | 0 | 1 | 0 | — | | — | | 13 | 0 |
| Flora U21 | 2014 | Esiliiga | 27 | 4 | 2 | 2 | — | | — | | 29 | 6 |
| Flora U21 | 2015 | Esiliiga | 31 | 8 | 3 | 0 | — | | — | | 34 | 8 |
| Flora U21 | 2016 | Esiliiga | 18 | 3 | 0 | 0 | — | | — | | 18 | 3 |
| Flora U21 | Total | | 88 | 15 | 6 | 2 | — | | — | | 94 | 17 |
| Tammeka U21 (loan) | 2016 | Esiliiga B | 1 | 1 | — | | — | | — | | 1 | 1 |
| Tammeka (loan) | 2016 | Meistriliiga | 6 | 1 | 2 | 4 | — | | — | | 8 | 5 |
| Tammeka (loan) | 2017 | Meistriliiga | 16 | 0 | 3 | 0 | — | | — | | 19 | 0 |
| Tammeka (loan) | Total | | 22 | 1 | 5 | 4 | — | | — | | 27 | 5 |
| Paide Linnameeskond (loan) | 2017 | Meistriliiga | 16 | 2 | 1 | 0 | — | | — | | 17 | 2 |
| Paide Linnameeskond (loan) | 2018 | Meistriliiga | 9 | 0 | 1 | 2 | — | | — | | 10 | 2 |
| Paide Linnameeskond (loan) | Total | | 25 | 2 | 2 | 2 | — | | — | | 27 | 4 |
| Paide Linnameeskond U21 (loan) | 2018 | Esiliiga B | 3 | 1 | — | | — | | — | | 1 | 1 |
| Nõmme United | 2018 | Esiliiga B | 11 | 2 | 0 | 0 | — | | — | | 11 | 2 |
| Nõmme United | 2019 | Esiliiga B | 29 | 6 | 1 | 0 | — | | — | | 30 | 6 |
| Nõmme United | 2020 | Esiliiga | 30 | 9 | 1 | 0 | — | | — | | 31 | 9 |
| Nõmme United | 2021 | Esiliiga | 7 | 1 | 0 | 0 | — | | — | | 7 | 1 |
| Nõmme United | Total | | 77 | 18 | 2 | 0 | — | | — | | 79 | 28 |
| Tallinn SC ReUnited | 2022 | III liiga | 4 | 0 | 1 | 0 | — | | 1 | 0 | 6 | 0 |
| FC London | 2025 | League1 Ontario Premier | 0 | 0 | — | | — | | 1 | 0 | 1 | 0 |
| Career total | | | 234 | 40 | 16 | 8 | 0 | 0 | 2 | 0 | 252 | 48 |
