= 1955 Estonian SSR Football Championship =

Estonian SSR Higher League
- Season: 1955
- Champions: Tallinna Kalev; 1st title

The 1955 Estonian SSR Football Championship was won by Tallinna Kalev.

== League table ==
Pos	Team	Pld	W	D	L	GF	GA	GD	Pts
1	Tallinna Kalev (C)	18	13	2	3	43	13	+30	28
2	Tartu Dünamo	18	12	4	2	37	15	+22	28
3	Viljandi Spartak	18	12	0	6	38	30	+8	24
4	Narva Kalev	18	9	4	5	36	16	+20	22
5	Officers' Club of Tallinn	18	9	2	7	32	26	+6	20
6	Järvakandi Kalev	18	8	2	8	33	30	+3	18
7	Kiviõli Kalev	18	8	2	8	28	34	−6	18
8	Pärnu Kalev	18	5	2	11	32	44	−12	12
9	Kohtla-Järve Kalev (R)	18	2	2	14	18	54	−36	6
10	Tallinna Dünamo II (R)	18	1	2	15	13	48	−35	4

(C) Champions; (R) Relegated

== Title play-off ==
Tallinna Kalev	3 – 1	Tartu Dünamo
