= Estonian Sports Association Kalev =

Kalev Sports Association
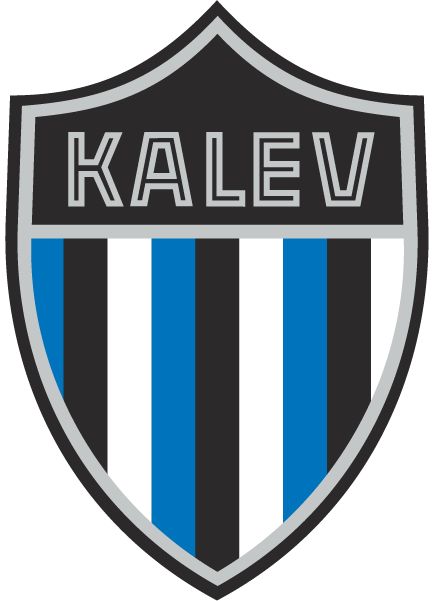
- Full name: Estonian Sports Association Kalev
- Founded: 6 June 1901; 123 years ago
- Based in: Tallinn, Estonia
- President: Neinar Seli
- Chairman: Aleksander Tammert
- Website: eestikalev.ee

Estonian Sports Association Kalev (Estonian: Eesti Spordiselts Kalev) is a sports association in Estonia, founded in 1901.

== History ==
The association was founded in 1901 in Tallinn as the Kalev Amateur Cyclist Society (Estonian: Jalgrattasõitjate Selts "Kalev"). In 1908, a tennis club was established at the society. Later it was joined by sections of athletics, swimming, football, Greco-Roman wrestling, rowing etc. In the 1920s, a basketball club was also set up at the organization.

In 1940, with the Soviet occupation of Estonia, Kalev was dissolved and its facilities were taken over by the Soviet All-Union Sports Society Dynamo. After World War II, in 1944 the Republican Volunteer Sports Society "Kalev" was formed by the Soviet authorities. At its peak during the Estonian SSR, it had 177,1 thousand members.

The sports association continued its activities after the restoration of Estonian independence. A 6 kroon, 50 senti postage stamp was issued to celebrate its centenary in 2001.

Kalevi Mängud (Kalev's Games) is an event organized by Kalev. The most recent one, III Kalevi Mängud, was held in 2006.

== Honours ==
In various competitions, including World Championships and the Olympic Games, members of Kalev have won a total of more than 400 medals. Among the most famous ones are chess player Paul Keres and Olympic gold winners – wrestler Johannes Kotkas, cyclist Aavo Pikkuus, volleyball player Viljar Loor, basketball player Tiit Sokk and skier Kristina Šmigun.

== Gallery ==
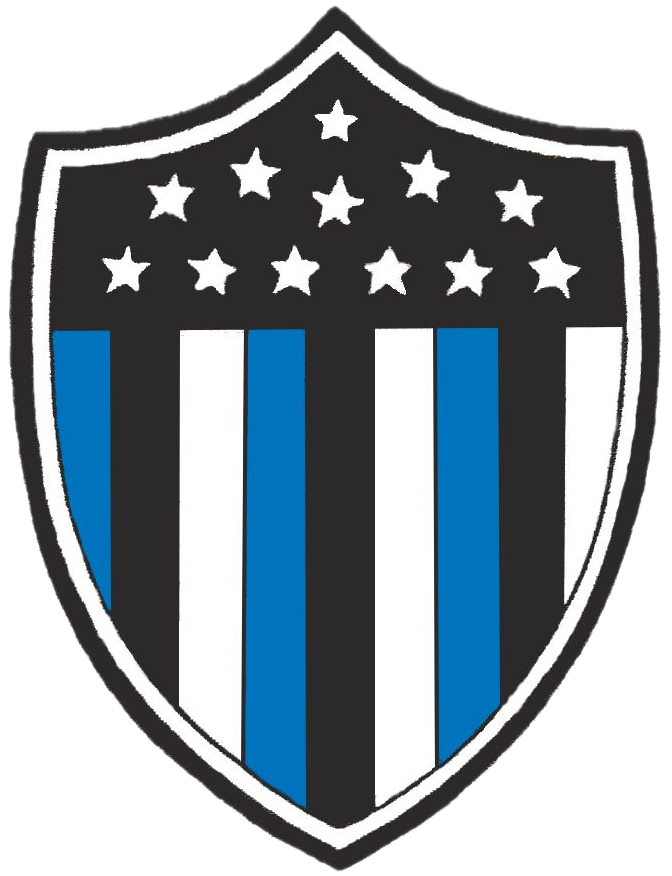
Kalev former emblem til 1940

Insignia of the Kalev Infantry Battalion, similar to the logo of the sports club (the stars were replaced by the word 'KALEV')

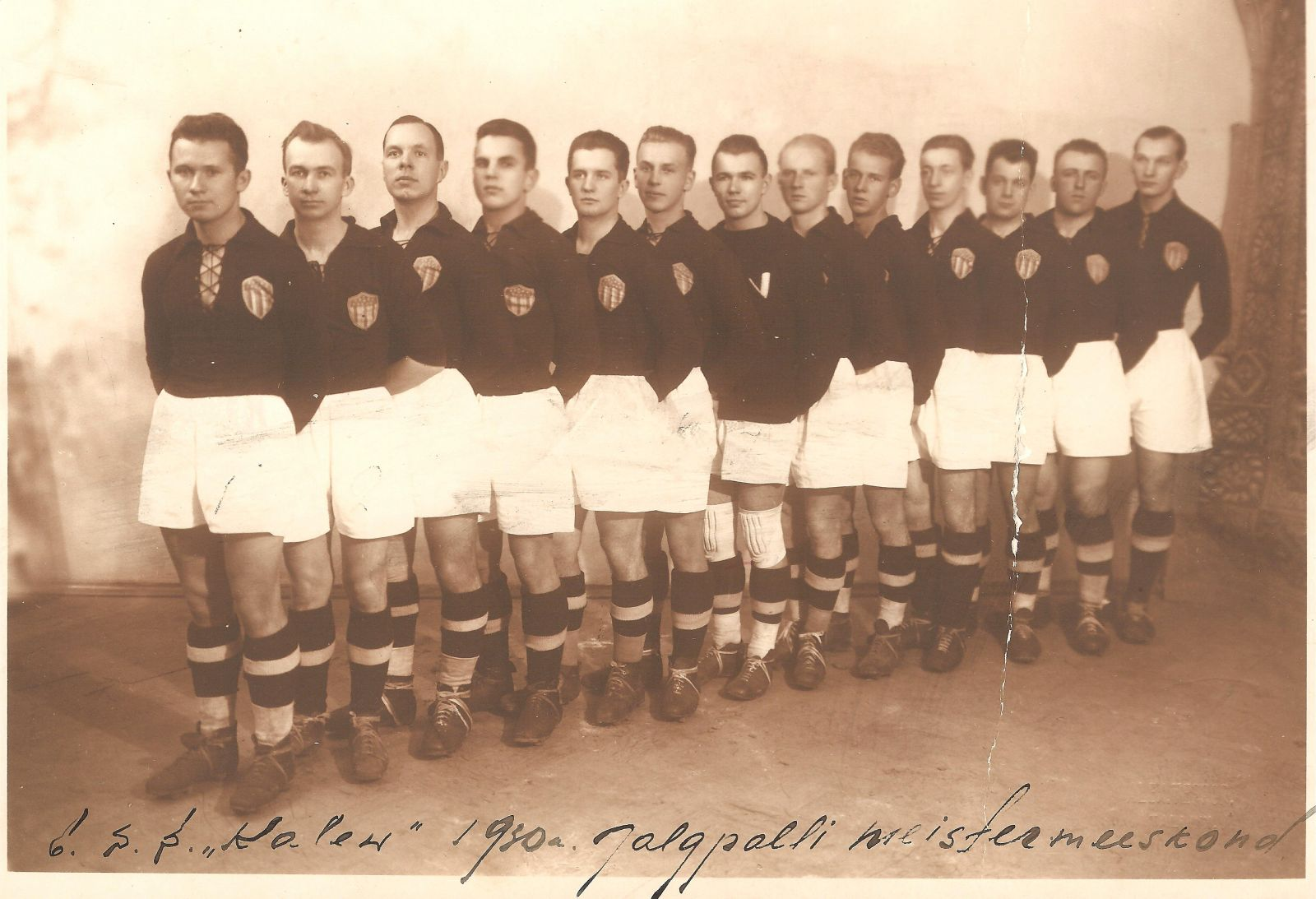
JK Tallinna Kalev football team in 1930

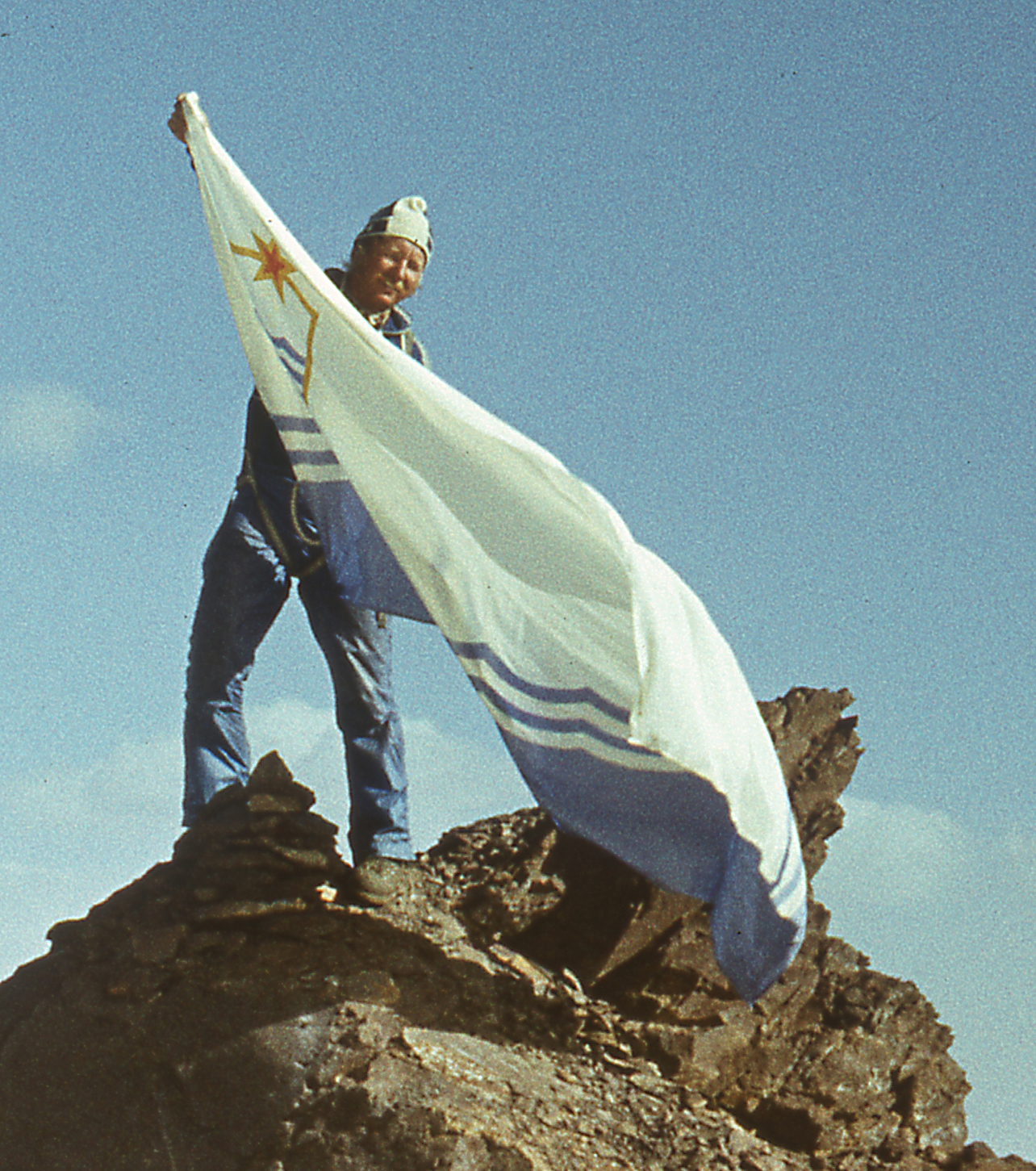
Estonian mountaineer Kalev Muru with the flag of the Soviet sports society Kalev in 1984

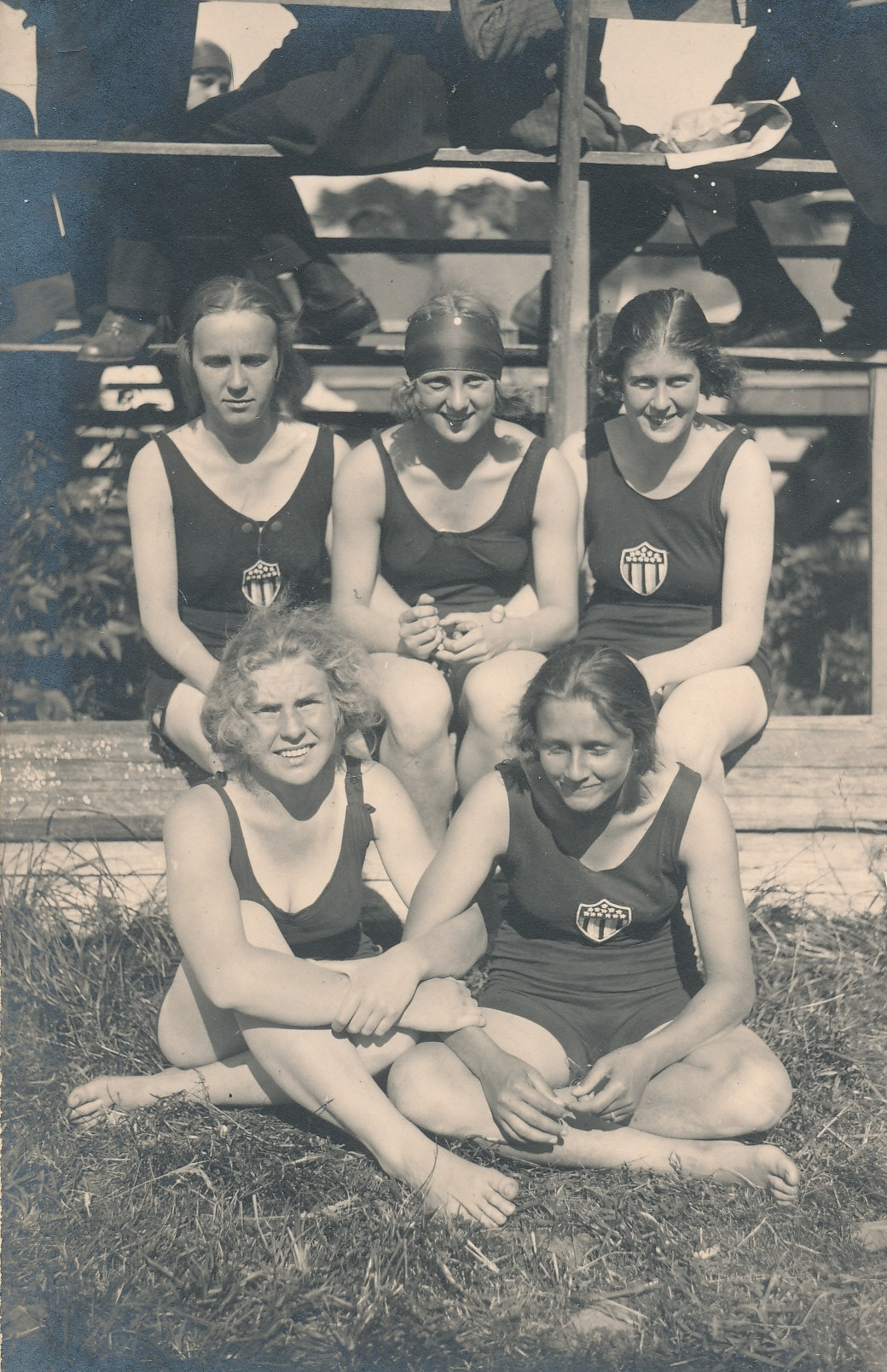
Kalev Sports Association swimmers, 1928

== See also ==
- JK Tallinna Kalev
- BC Kalev/Cramo
- BC Tallinna Kalev
- Kalev Tallinn
