= 2021 Esiliiga =

Estonian football league season for second division

Esiliiga
- Season: 2021
- Champions: Maardu Linnameeskond (2nd title)
- Promoted: Tallinna Kalev
- Relegated: Maardu Linnameeskond; Tammeka U21; Welco
- Matches: 147
- Goals: 584 (3.97 per match)
- Top goalscorer: Robi Saarma (28 goals)
- Biggest home win: Maardu Linnameeskond 7–0 Welco (18 September 2021)
- Biggest away win: Tammeka U21 0–8 Nõmme United (12 September 2021)
- Highest scoring: Paide Linnameeskond U21 6–5 Nõmme United (20 November 2021)

The 2021 Esiliiga was the 31st season of the Esiliiga, the second-highest Estonian league for association football clubs, since its establishment in 1992. The season began on 4 March 2021 and concluded on 21 November 2021. Defending champions Maardu Linnameeskond won their second Esiliiga title.

== Teams ==
=== Stadiums and locations ===
Locations of the 2021 Esiliiga teams

Team	Location	Stadium	Capacity
Elva	Elva	Elva linnastaadion	600
FCI Levadia U21	Tallinn	Maarjamäe Stadium	30
Flora U21	Tallinn	Lilleküla training ground	200
Maardu Linnameeskond	Maardu	Maardu linnastaadion	500
Nõmme United	Tallinn	Männiku Stadium	50
Paide Linnameeskond U21	Paide	Paide linnastaadion	268
Pärnu Jalgpalliklubi	Pärnu	Pärnu Rannastaadion	1,501
Tallinna Kalev	Tallinn	Kalevi Keskstaadion artificial turf	270
Tammeka U21	Tartu	Sepa Jalgpallikeskus	508
Welco	Tartu	Annelinna Stadium	656

=== Personnel and kits ===
Team	Manager	Captain	Kit manufacturer	Shirt sponsor
Elva	(Estonia) Veiko Haan	(Estonia) Markus Lokk	Nike	Sportland
FCI Levadia U21	(Estonia) Robert Sadovski	(Estonia) Andrei Grigorjev	Adidas	Viimsi Keevitus
Flora U21	(Estonia) Ats Sillaste	(Estonia) Igor Ustritski	Nike	Tele2
Maardu Linnameeskond	(Lithuania) Algimantas Briaunys	(Estonia) Ilja Zelentsov	Adidas	
Nõmme United	(Estonia) Martin Klasen	(Estonia) Sander Alex Liit	Uhlsport	Apollo
Paide Linnameeskond U21	(Estonia) Erki Kesküla	(Estonia) Mattias Sapp	Nike	Verston
Pärnu Jalgpalliklubi	(Estonia) Igor Prins	(Estonia) Veiko Vespere	Hummel	Savi
Tallinna Kalev	(Estonia) Aivar Anniste (Estonia) Daniel Meijel	(Estonia) Kaspar Laur	Macron	Coolbet
Tammeka U21	(Estonia) Marti Pähn	(Estonia) Dominic Laaneots	Nike	Metec
Welco	(Estonia) Meelis Eelmäe	(Estonia) Mikk Valtna	Adidas	Holm Bank

=== Managerial changes ===
Team	Outgoing manager	Manner of departure	Date of vacancy	Position in table	Incoming manager	Date of appointment
Tallinna Kalev	(Latvia) Dmitrijs Kalašņikovs	End of caretaker spell	30 November 2020	Pre-season	(Estonia) Aivar Anniste (Estonia) Daniel Meijel	1 March 2021
Welco	(Estonia) Janar Sagim	Resigned	22 January 2021	Pre-season	(Estonia) Meelis Eelmäe	25 January 2021

== League table ==
Pos	Team	Pld	W	D	L	GF	GA	GD	Pts	Promotion, qualification or relegation
1	Maardu Linnameeskond (C)	30	23	4	3	99	30	+69	73	
2	Tallinna Kalev	30	21	8	1	78	32	+46	71	Promotion to Meistriliiga (Note: Despite winning the league, Maardu Linnameeskond declined promotion to Meistriliiga and applied to join II liiga for the following season. Tallinna Kalev was promoted instead and Pärnu Jalgpalliklubi was able to maintain its spot in Esiliiga despite losing the relegation play-offs.)
3	Paide Linnameeskond U21	30	17	3	10	85	56	+29	54	
4	Nõmme United	30	12	5	13	79	67	+12	41	
5	Flora U21	27	11	6	10	38	47	−9	39	
6	Elva	27	9	2	16	42	54	−12	29	
7	FCI Levadia U21	30	10	5	15	52	77	−25	35	
8	Pärnu Jalgpalliklubi	30	8	5	17	38	61	−23	29	Qualification for relegation play-offs
9	Tammeka U21 (R)	30	6	7	17	43	82	−39	25	Relegation to Esiliiga B
10	Welco (R)	30	5	5	20	30	78	−48	20	Relegation to Esiliiga B

Source: Soccerway (in English), Esiliiga (in Estonian)
Rules for classification: 1) Points; 2) Less matches awarded against; 3) Head-to-head points; 4) Head-to-head goal difference; 5) Matches won; 6) Goal difference; 7) Goals scored; 8) Away goals scored; 9) Fair-play points; 10) Draw
(C) Champions; (R) Relegated

== Relegation play-offs ==
27 November 2021
16:00 (UTC+2)

Alliance	4–1	Pärnu Jalgpalliklubi
Yuri 25', 66'; Mitsuk 45+1'; Orlov 76'	Report	Simanis 38'

Kohtla-Järve artificial turf, Kohtla-Järve
Attendance: 88
Referee: Dmitri Kirilov
4 December 2021
13:00 (UTC+2)

Pärnu Jalgpalliklubi	0–0	Alliance
	Report

Pärnu Rehepapi artificial turf, Pärnu
Attendance: 50
Referee: Marko Liiva

Alliance won 4–1 on aggregate.

== Results ==
=== Matches 1–18 ===
Home \ Away	ELV	LEV	FLO	MLM	NÕM	PLM	PJK	KAL	TAM	WEL
Elva		3–1	1–3	0–6	5–2	0–1	3–0	0–4	4–0	3–2
FCI Levadia U21	4–2		1–0	0–5	2–7	2–3	1–2	3–4	3–0	1–2
Flora U21	1–0	1–1		0–3	2–2	2–2	2–0	1–5	2–1	1–1
Maardu	2–1	3–1	1–3		5–1	2–1	5–0	1–2	2–2	6–0
Nõmme United	2–2	1–1	2–1	1–3		0–4	5–0	2–2	2–3	4–0
Paide U21	3–1	1–2	8–2	2–5	4–1		4–0	0–4	8–2	2–1
Pärnu	2–1	2–2	1–2	1–2	0–1	2–4		2–2	2–0	2–1
Tallinna Kalev	1–0	5–0	1–1	2–2	2–0	0–2	3–2		5–1	2–1
Tammeka U21	1–0	3–4	0–1	1–2	1–6	0–4	1–3	1–5		6–0
Welco	3–0	0–1	0–0	0–4	0–4	0–4	1–3	0–1	1–1	

Source: Estonian Football Association (in Estonian)
Legend: Blue = home team win; Yellow = draw; Red = away team win.

=== Matches 19–30 ===
Home \ Away	ELV	LEV	FLO	MLM	NÕM	PLM	PJK	KAL	TAM	WEL
Elva				0–1	3–4		0–0	1–2	1–4	4–2
FCI Levadia U21	2–4			0–4			3–2		1–1	
Flora U21	0–1	1–2		1–8						5–1
Maardu					4–0	2–1	1–1	1–1	4–2	7–0
Nõmme United		7–2	0–1	2–4		3–4		0–2		
Paide U21	1–2	4–1	1–2	0–2	6–5		2–4	0–4		4–0
Pärnu			0–1		0–2			0–3	1–3	
Tallinna Kalev		2–2	1–0	4–2	2–2	3–3				
Tammeka U21			3–2		0–8	2–2		0–1		
Welco		3–2			2–3		2–1	2–3	1–1	

Source: Estonian Football Association (in Estonian)
Legend: Blue = home team win; Yellow = draw; Red = away team win.

== Season statistics ==
=== Top scorers ===
Rank	Player	Club	Goals
1	(Estonia) Robi Saarma	Nõmme United	28
2	(Estonia) Ats Purje	Tallinna Kalev	24
3	(Estonia) Vitali Gussev	Maardu Linnameeskond	21
4	(Estonia) Vadim Aksjonov	Maardu Linnameeskond	16
4	(Estonia) Kristofer Piht	Paide Linnameeskond U21	16
6	(Estonia) Roman Sobtšenko	Maardu Linnameeskond	15
7	(Estonia) Ilja Zelentsov	Maardu Linnameeskond	13
8	(Estonia) Lars-Indrek Aigro	Nõmme United	12
8	(Estonia) Silard Simanis	Pärnu Jalgpalliklubi	12
10	(Estonia) Andreas Kiivit	Flora U21	11
10	(Estonia) Ramol Sillamaa	Tallinna Kalev	11

== Awards ==
=== Monthly awards ===
Month	Manager of the Month		Player of the Month	
Month	Manager	Club	Player	Club
May	(Lithuania) Algimantas Briaunys	Maardu Linnameeskond	(Estonia) Ats Purje	Tallinna Kalev
June/July	(Estonia) Aivar Anniste (Estonia) Daniel Meijel	Tallinna Kalev	(Estonia) Kaspar Laur	Tallinna Kalev
September	(Estonia) Martin Klasen	Nõmme United	(Estonia) Robi Saarma	Nõmme United
October	(Lithuania) Algimantas Briaunys	Maardu Linnameeskond	(Estonia) Lars-Indrek Aigro	Nõmme United

=== Esiliiga Player of the Year ===
Ats Purje was named Esiliiga Player of the Year.

== See also ==
- 2020–21 Estonian Cup
- 2021–22 Estonian Cup
- 2021 Meistriliiga
- 2021 Esiliiga B
