= Vahur Vahtramäe =

Estonian footballer

Personal information
- Full name: Vahur Vahtramäe
- Date of birth: 24 September 1976 (age 50)
- Place of birth: Estonia
- Height: 1.69 m (5 ft 6 1/2 in)
- Position: Midfielder

Senior career*
Years	Team	Apps	(Gls)
1993–1994	FC Norma Tallinn	4	(0)
1993–1994	→ FC Panterid Tallinn		
1995–1996	FC Flora Tallinn	1	(0)
1995–1996	→ JK Tervis Pärnu	9	(0)
1996	Lelle SK	15	(1)
1997–2001	JK Tulevik Viljandi	74	(6)
1997–1998	→ JK Dokker Viljandi	2	(1)
1998–1999	→ FC Warrior Valga	4	(1)
2000	→ FC Kuressaare	17	(0)
2001	→ FC Elva	8	(0)
2002	FC Kuressaare	28	(1)
2003	FC Warrior Valga	25	(2)
2004–2005	FC Hiiu Kalur Kärdla	4	(0)
2005–2009	JK Kalev Tallinn	110	(8)
2006	→ HyPS (loan)	10	(0)
2007–2008	→ JK Kalev II Tallinn	2	(1)
2010–2012	Paide Linnameeskond	6	(0)

International career
1994–1996	Estonia	7	(0)
- * Club domestic league appearances and goals

Vahur Vahtramäe (born 24 September 1976) is an Estonian retired football midfielder, who last played for Paide Linnameeskond in the Meistriliiga, the highest division in Estonian football.

== Club career ==
He has played for several clubs in Estonia, including JK Tallinna Kalev, JK Tulevik Viljandi and Paide Linnameeskond.

== International career ==
Vahtramäe earned his first official cap for the Estonia national football team on 26 October 1994, when Estonia lost 0–7 to Finland in a friendly match. He was a substitute for Mati Pari.

== Managerial career ==
He has been the assistant coach of Estonia U17.
