= FC Meteor Tallinn =

Estonian football club

Meteor Tallinn
- Full name: Meteor Tallinn
- Founded: 1908
- Ground: Tallinn, Estonia
Home colours

Meteor Tallinn is a former football club from the Estonian capital Tallinn.

== History ==
The club was founded in 1908 in the Lasnamäe district of Tallinn, making it the oldest football club in Estonia. The jersey was blue and white, and trousers were white. A short time later was based in Tallinn, another football club, whose name was Merkuur. Meteor played against Merkuur on 6 June 1909 the first football game in Estonia and won 4–2.

== See also ==
- Estonian Football Association
