= Rahvaleht =

Newspaper

- Publisher: Vaba Maa
- Founded: 1923
- Ceased publication: 1940
- Language: Estonian

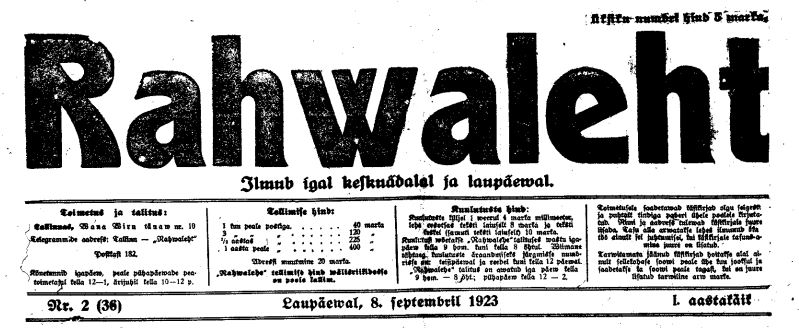
1923 edition of Rahvaleht

Rahvaleht was newspaper published 1923–1940 in Tallinn, Estonia. It was published by Bibliofiil (1926, nr. 154 - 1927, nr. 124) and thereafter by Vaba Maa (1927-1940)

Its precursor was Pulmaleht; published in 1923.
