= JK Tallinna Kalev =

Estonian football club

Kalev
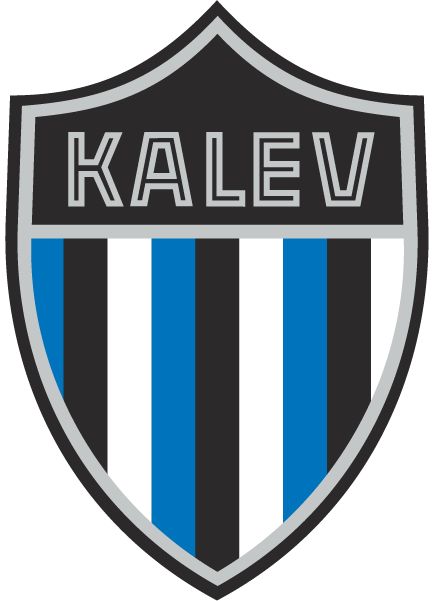
- Full name: Jalgpalliklubi Tallinna Kalev
- Founded: 1909; 117 years ago (as Meteor); 25 May 1911; 115 years ago (as Kalev); Re-established on 1 September 2002; 24 years ago
- Ground: Kadriorg Stadium
- Capacity: 5,000
- President: Ragnar Klavan
- Manager: Randin Rande
- League: Esiliiga
- 2026: Esiliiga, 6th of 10
- Website: https://jkkalev.ee
Home colours	Away colours

Jalgpalliklubi Tallinna Kalev, also known as Tallinna Kalev or simply Kalev, is an Estonian professional football club based in Tallinn that competes in Esiliiga, the second-highest division in the Estonian football. Founded in 1911, it is the oldest active football club in the country. The club's home ground is the Kadriorg Stadium.

Formed as Meteor in 1909, the club changed its name to Kalev in 1911 after joining the Estonian Sports Association Kalev. The club were founding members of the Estonian Football Championship in 1921. Kalev have won two Estonian championship titles, in 1923 and 1930, and one Estonian SSR championship in 1955. The club was re-established in 2002 and has played in the Meistriliiga in 2007–2009, 2012–2014, 2018–2020 and most recently from 2022 until 2025.

== History ==
=== Early years ===
Kalev's origins lie with Meteor. Jalgpalliselts Meteor (Football Association Meteor) was formed in 1909 by students Julius Reinans and Bernhard Abrams. The team was first coached by a Scottish flax merchant John Stormonth Urquhart who also ordered the team's first uniforms, consisting of blue shirts and white shorts. The team included several players who would become notable athletes, such as future Estonia national team players Voldemar Luik and Otto Silber and Olympic runner Johannes Villemson. On 6 June 1909, Meteor and Merkuur played the first official football match in Estonia. The match took place at the grounds behind the Lower Lighthouse in Lasnamäe and was won by Meteor 4–2.

On 27 May 1911, Meteor joined the Estonian Sports Association Kalev and changed its name to Kalev. In 1913, the team moved to the new Tiigiveski Ground.

=== Estonian champions ===
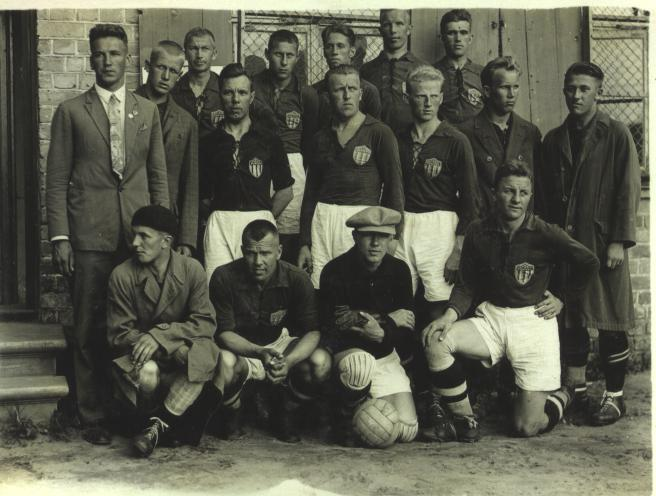
The 1923 Kalev team, who won the club's first league title

In the 1920s, the newly formed Estonian Football Championship was dominated by Tallinn sides Kalev, Sport and TJK. The derby matches between the clubs drew thousands of spectators. Kalev won their first league title in 1923. The team included Estonian internationals such as Eduard Ellmann, Ernst Joll, Elmar Kaljot, August Lass and Arnold Pihlak, who went on to represent Estonia at the 1924 Summer Olympics. On 16 August 1925, the team suffered a serious setback when the board of the association expelled eight key players from the squad over their decision to play in the opening match of TJK's new ground without the board's permission. The players subsequently joined TJK.

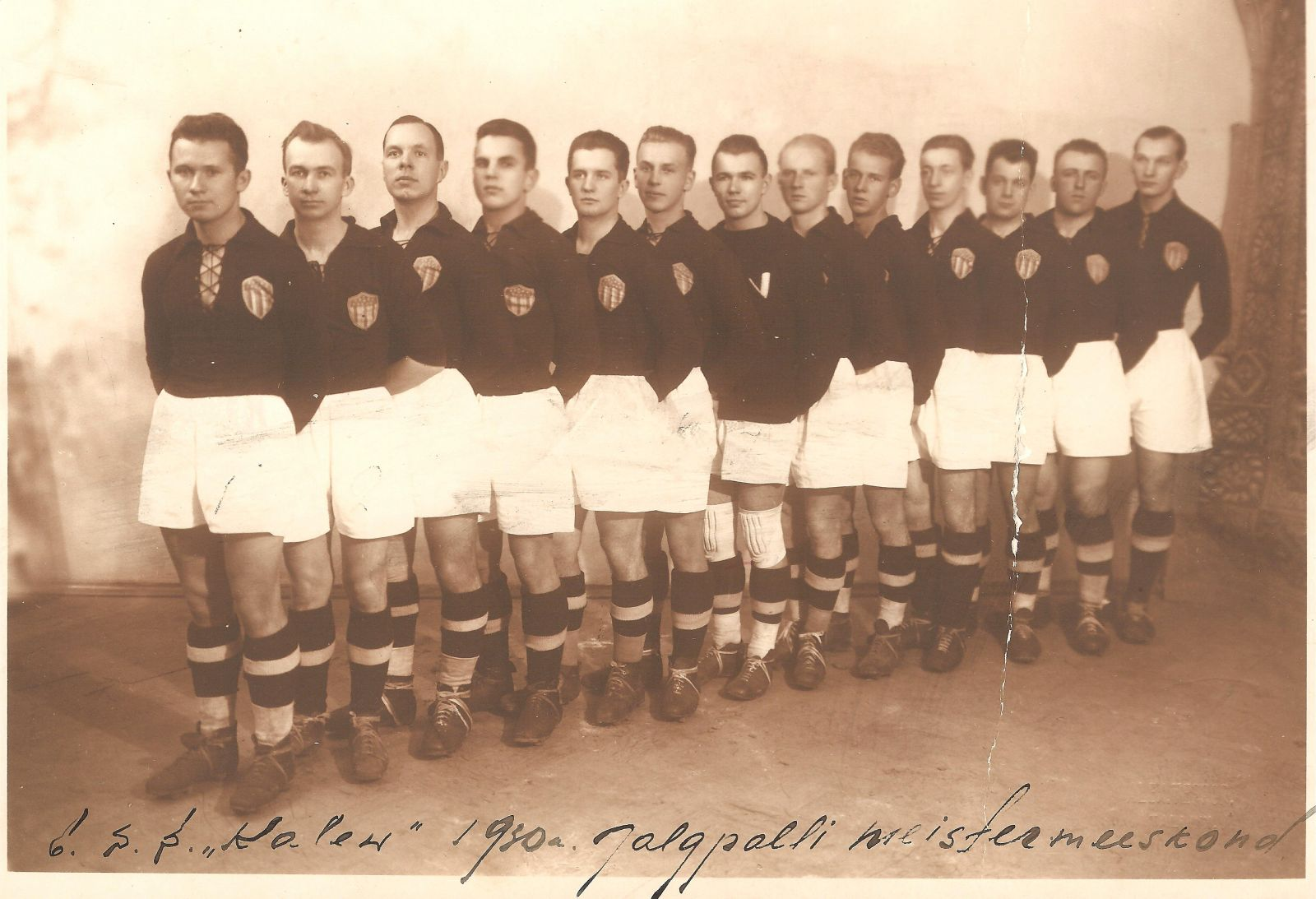
Kalev's championship-winning team in 1930

Tallinna Kalev won their second championship in the controversial 1930 season. Although never proven officially, the victory was widely accepted as a result of match fixing. To win the title, Kalev needed to win the final game of the season against the formidable Narva Võitleja by eight goals and went on to win the match 11–0. Võitleja's performance was so poor that allegations of match fixing began instantly, with Kalev board member Aleksander Mändvere being accused of bribing Võitleja players, particularly the team's goalkeeper Viruvere.

Kalev reached the 1939 Estonian Cup final, but lost to TJK 1–4.

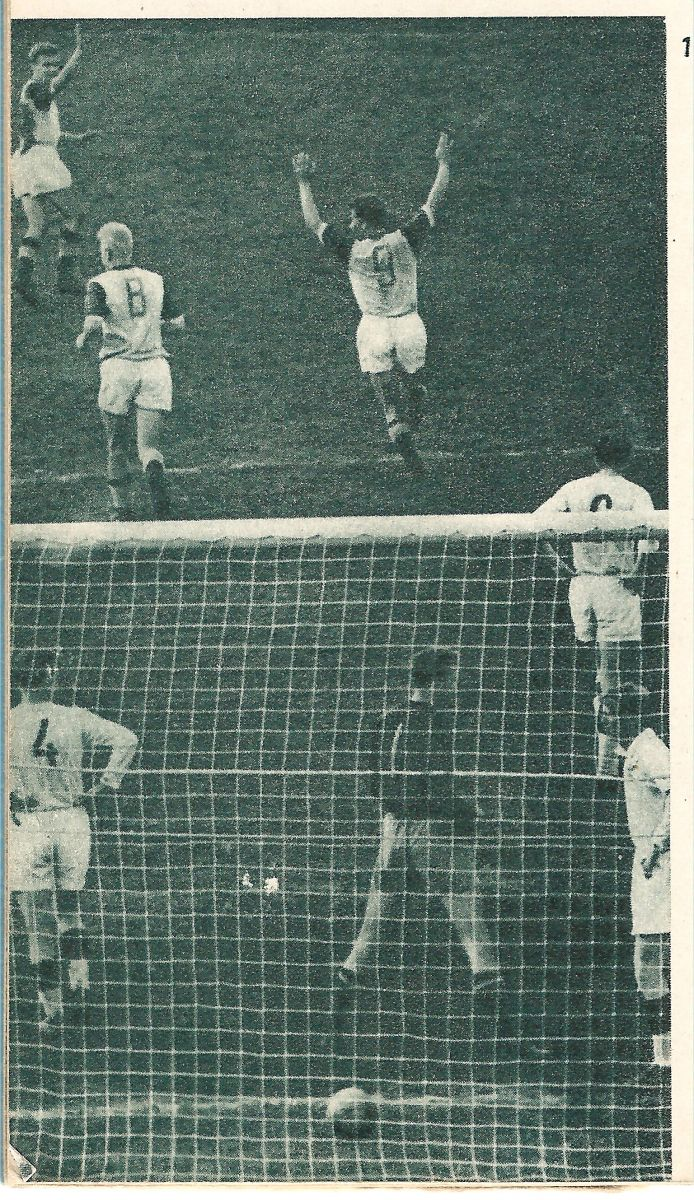
Kalev 2-2 Spartak Moscow, 1961

=== Kalev in Soviet football ===
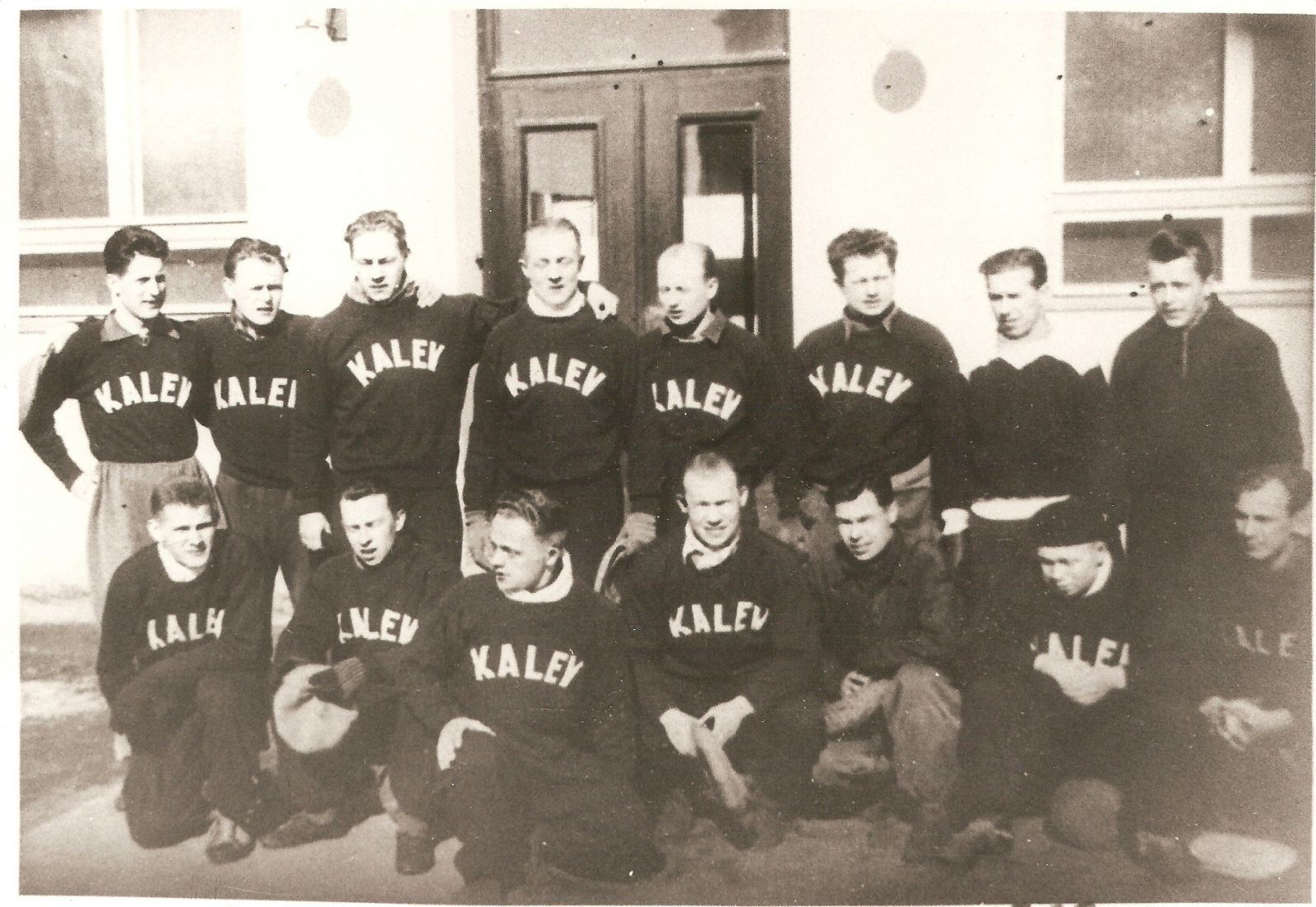
Kalev team in 1961

Following World War II and the Soviet occupation of Estonia, Kalev joined the Soviet Union football league system, competing in the second tier of Soviet football from 1947 to 1954, while Kalev's second team played in the local Estonian SSR championship. In 1955, Kalev's first team returned to the local championship, winning their third league title.

In 1960, Kalev joined Class A, the top flight of Soviet football. The team finished their first season in Class A in 19th place out of 22 teams. The home match against Dynamo Moscow in Kalev's Komsomol Stadium brought a record 20,000 people onto the stands, as a number of Dynamo's players along with the famed Lev Yashin had been crowned European champions less than a month before. In the 1961 season, Kalev finished last and were relegated to Class B. Despite the relegation, Kalev showed several great performances during the season, drawing 2–2 with bronze medalists Spartak Moscow and 0–0 with Dynamo Moscow.

=== Re-establishment ===
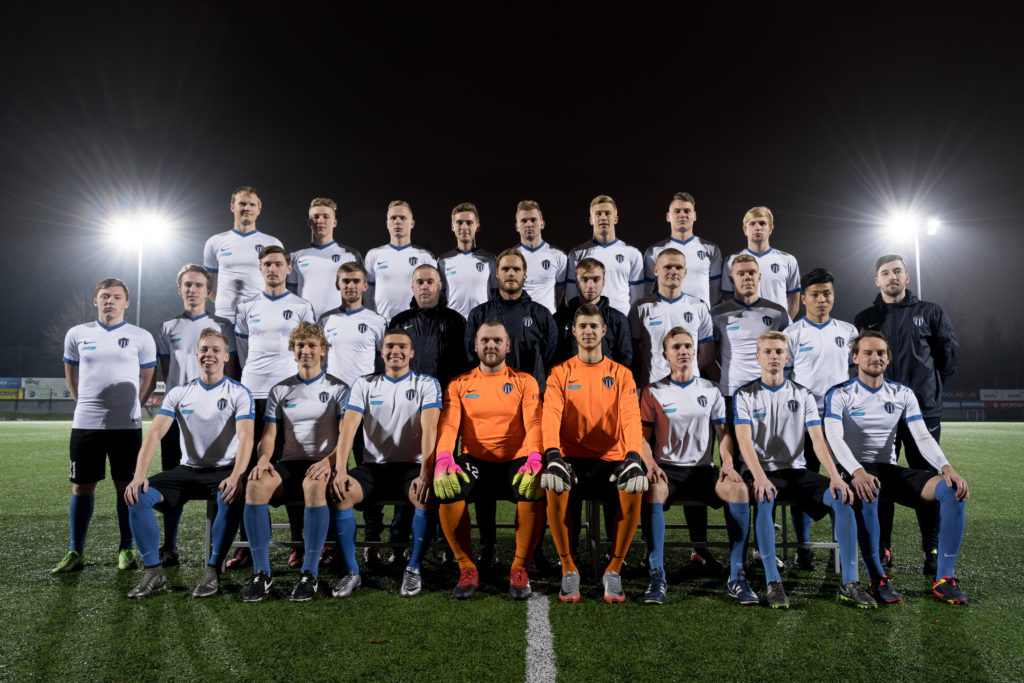
Kalev team in 2017

Tallinna Kalev was re-established on 1 September 2002 and joined the Estonian football league system. The club won the Northern division of the III liiga in 2003. In 2004, Aavo Sarap was appointed as manager and Tallinna Kalev won the East/North division of the II liiga. The club finished the 2006 Esiliiga in third place and were promoted to the Meistriliiga, returning to the top flight of Estonian football. Tallinna Kalev finished the 2007 season in sixth place. In August 2009, Sarap's contract was terminated and he was replaced by his assistant Daniel Meijel. The team finished the 2009 season in last place and were relegated.

In January 2010, Sergei Ratnikov was appointed as manager. Tallinna Kalev won the 2011 Esiliiga were promoted back to the Meistriliiga. The club finished the 2012 season in ninth place, but avoided being relegated by defeating Tarvas 3–1 on aggregate in the relegation play-offs. In December 2012, Frank Bernhardt was appointed as manager. Tallinna Kalev finished the 2013 season in eighth place. In January 2014, former Estonia national team manager Tarmo Rüütli took over as manager. Rüütli subsequently left in March 2014 and Sergei Zamogilnõi took over as manager. Following a disappointing 2014 season, where Tallinna Kalev finished in 10th place and were relegated to the Esiliiga once again, Zamogilnõi was replaced by Marko Pärnpuu.

In May 2016, it was announced that Ragnar Klavan would become the club's president. Former New York Red Bulls player Joel Lindpere took over the sporting director role. Tallinna Kalev returned to the Meistriliiga after finishing the 2017 Esiliiga season as runners-up. In November 2017, Pärnpuu was replaced by Argo Arbeiter. The team finished the 2018 season in eighth place, after which Arbeiter left and Aleksandr Dmitrijev took over as manager and also led Kalev to an eighth-place finish in the 2019 season. Kalev was relegated from Meistriliiga in 2020, after finishing the season in last place, but returned to top-flight football in 2022. Led by Daniel Meijel and Aivar Anniste, the club finished the 2022 season in eighth place.

=== Qualification to Europe ===
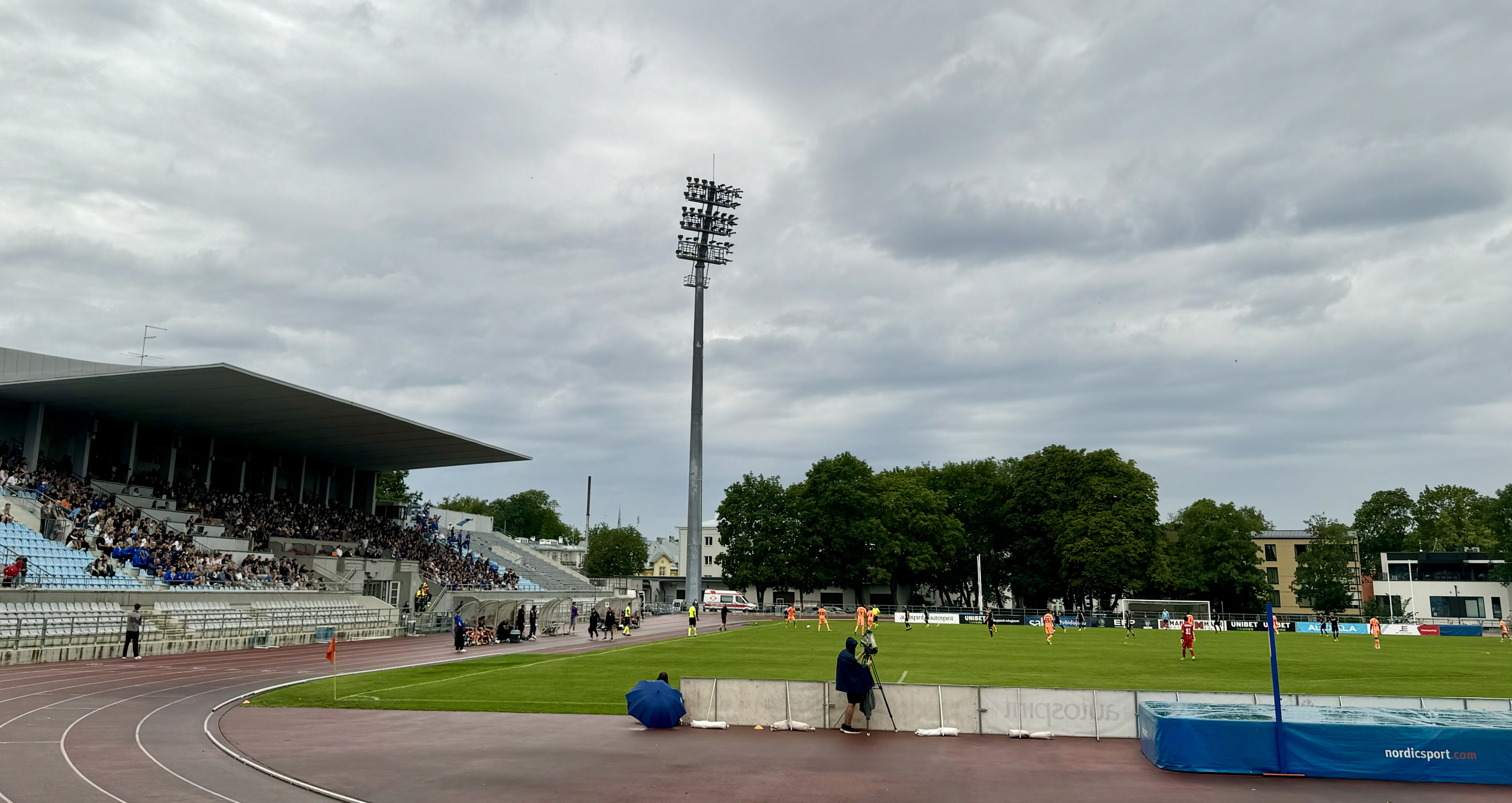
Kalev during their first-ever UEFA Conference League match in July 2024

2023 was a groundbreaking year for Kalev in many ways. The club constructed an indoor football dome in Mustamäe and became the first football club in the country to open a specialised football academy. The summer transfer window saw club's president Ragnar Klavan join the first team as a player. Kalev also acquired Finnish goalkeeper Oskari Forsman, who was named in the Team of the Year after the season, and also named The Best Goalkeeper and The Best Transfer of the Season. Tallinna Kalev finished the 2023 season in 3rd place, earning their first bronze medals since the 1937–38 season and qualifying to UEFA Conference League, the first European campaign in the club's entire history. Kalev made their debut in Europe on 11 July 2024, losing 1–2 to Urartu in the home leg of the Conference League first qualifying round. In August 2024, Kalev appointed Teemu Tainio as head coach. The club finished the 2024 season in ninth place, but avoided relegation by defeating Viimsi 2–1 on aggregate in the play-offs.

Kalev were relegated from the top division in 2025.

== Crest and colours ==
Kalev's original crest was created during the Estonian national awakening period and adopted the Estonian flag's blue-black-white tricolour, which remains as the prominent part of the crest to this day. The first crest also featured 12 stars, of which eleven symbolised each of the eleven counties of Estonia, and the twelfth star was a symbol for the Estonians who were forced to spend their life abroad and away from their homeland. After the country was occupied by the Soviet Union in 1940, all symbols relating to Estonian nationalism were banned. The current crest was created in 1988 in the wake of the Singing Revolution and saw the stars of the original crest replaced by the letters "KALEV".

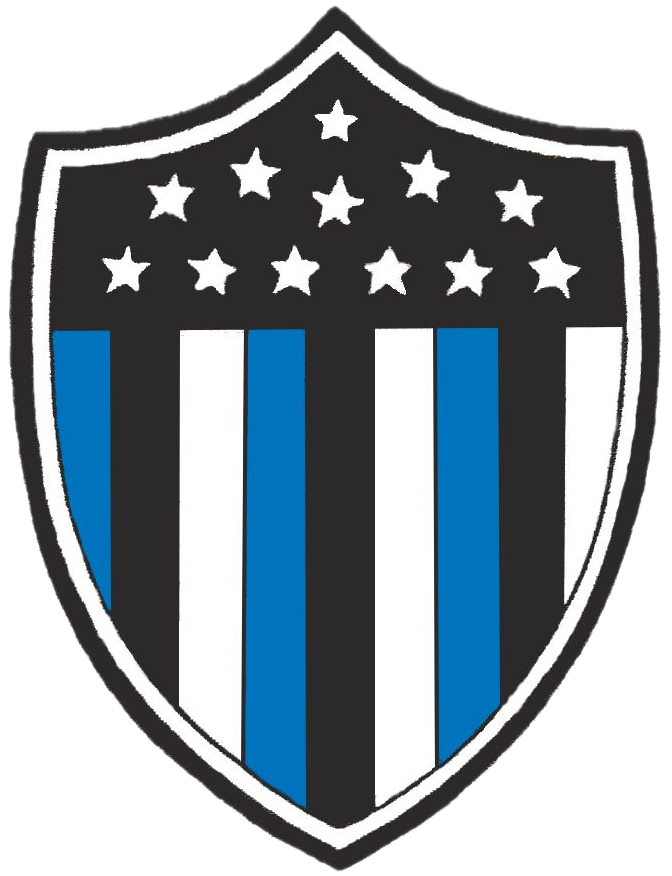
Former crest (1911–1940)

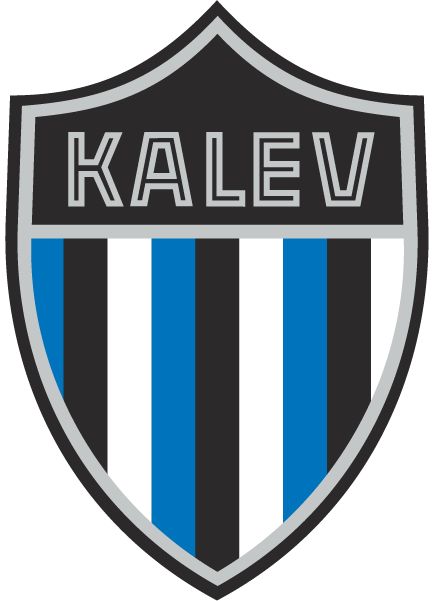
Crest in use since 2002

Kalev traditionally played in black shirts and white shorts during the first period of independence of Estonia. After the club was re-established in 2002, Kalev began playing in white shirts before adopting the Estonian tricolour as their home colours in 2019, after which they played in blue shirts, black shorts and white socks until 2022. In 2023, Kalev returned to their original black coloured home shirts.

== Kit manufacturers and shirt sponsors ==
Period	Kit manufacturer	Shirt sponsor	Ref
2008–2011	Nike	Unicef	
2012–2014	Jako	—	
2015–2017	Nike	—	
2018–2019	Nike	Coolbet	
2020–2022	Macron	Coolbet	
2023–2025	Macron	Unibet	
2026–	Macron	peaasi.ee	

== Stadium ==
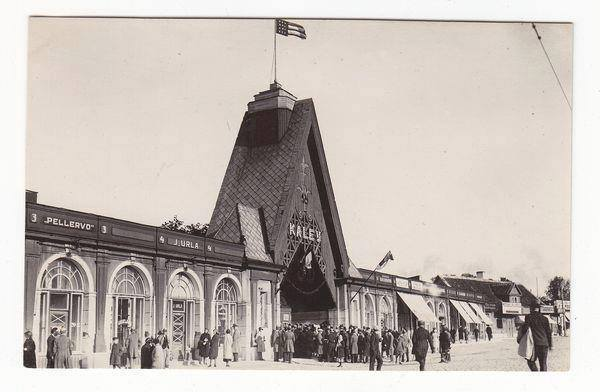
Kalevi Aed was the home of Kalev from 1923 until the 1940s

Kalev first started playing its home matches at the Tiigiveski Ground, before the club opened Kalevi Aed in the Tallinn city centre in 1923. Kalevi Aed was destroyed after World War II, in the 1940s.

The club's traditional home ground is the 12,000-seat Kalevi Keskstaadion. Opened on 12 July 1955, the multi-purpose stadium was built near Kalev's old Tiigiveski Ground. Initially named Kalev Komsomol Stadium, the name was changed to Kalevi Keskstaadion in 1989. It used to be the largest football stadium in Estonia until the expansion of A. Le Coq Arena in 2018.

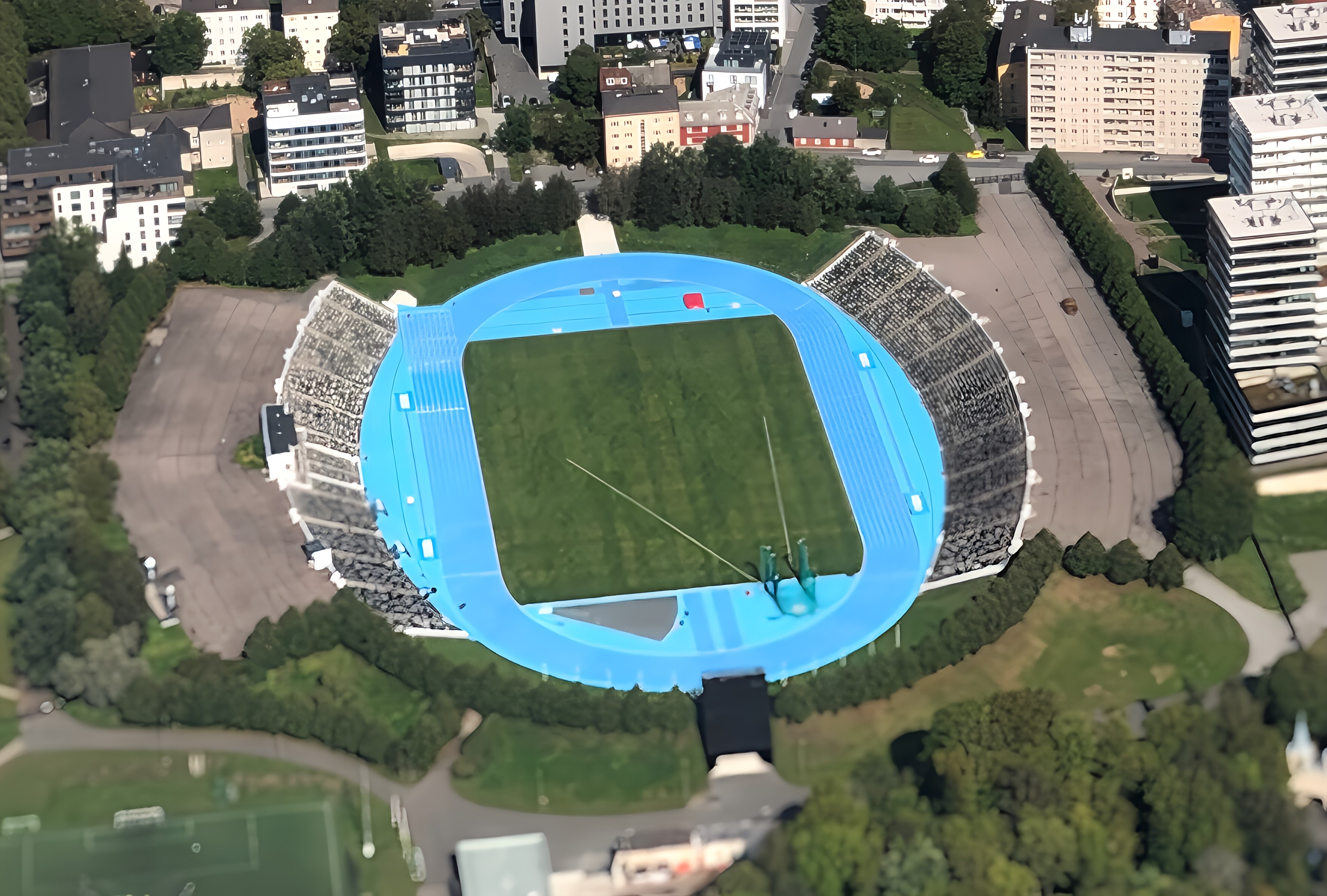
Kalevi Keskstaadion in 2023

From the 2020 season the team moved to Kadriorg Stadium, as Kalevi Keskstaadion underwent renovation due to its poor condition. Although the renovation works were completed in 2022, the football club has not returned to the 12,000-capacity stadium due to a dispute with the owner of the stadium complex, the Estonian Sports Association Kalev, which has evolved into a court case.

Tallinna Kalev uses the 1,198-seat artificial turf ground Sportland Arena for home matches during winter and early spring months. In 2024, the club opened an indoor football facility named Raja Jalgpallihall that serves as the club's primary training base.

== Players ==
=== Current squad ===
As of 1 September 2026.

Note: Flags indicate national team as defined under FIFA eligibility rules; some limited exceptions apply. Players may hold more than one non-FIFA nationality.

No.	Pos.	Nation	Player
5	DF	EST	Samuel Kirsipuu
6	MF	EST	Dylan Sal-Al-Saller
7	FW	EST	Henri Lehtmaa (on loan from Paide)
8	MF	EST	Oscar De Pizzol
9	FW	EST	Raiko Ilves
10	FW	EST	Arseni Gusarov
13	GK	EST	Miron Vetkal
14	MF	EST	Ander Sikk (on loan from Harju Laagri)
15	MF	EST	Artur Timoska
17	MF	EST	Enrico Järitsa

No.	Pos.	Nation	Player
18	FW	EST	Vadim Mihhailov
19	MF	EST	Martin Tomberg
21	MF	EST	Daniil Petrunin
22	MF	EST	Artur Sakarias
23	DF	EST	Artur Sibul
25	MF	UKR	Jonathan Jose
26	DF	EST	Rafael Luts
32	GK	EST	Joonatan Kaljurand
36	FW	GEO	Saba Kenchoshvili

=== Out on loan ===
Note: Flags indicate national team as defined under FIFA eligibility rules; some limited exceptions apply. Players may hold more than one non-FIFA nationality.

No.	Pos.	Nation	Player

== Personnel ==
=== Current technical staff ===
Position	Name
Head coach	(Estonia) Randin Rande
Assistant coaches	(Portugal) Diogo Marinho
Assistant coaches	(Estonia) Vitali Pavlov
Assistant coaches	(Estonia) Ats Purje (player-coach)
Goalkeeping coach	(Estonia) Andree Marjamaa
Fitness coach	(Estonia) Edvin Verhogljad
Physiotherapist	(Estonia) Marten Männi
Management
President	(Estonia) Ragnar Klavan
Chief Executive Officer	(Estonia) Markus Jürgenson
Academy Director	(Estonia) Aivar Anniste
Head of youth	(Estonia) Madis Metsmägi

=== Managerial history ===
Dates	Name
1922	(Austria) Hans Lustig
1923	(Austria) Max Adler
2004–2009	(Estonia) Aavo Sarap
2009	(Estonia) Daniel Meijel
2010–2012	(Estonia) Sergei Ratnikov
2012–2013	(Germany) Frank Bernhardt
2013–2014	(Estonia) Tarmo Rüütli
2014	(Estonia) Sergei Zamogilnõi
2014–2017	(Estonia) Marko Pärnpuu
2017–2018	(Estonia) Argo Arbeiter
2019–2020	(Estonia) Aleksandr Dmitrijev
2020	(Estonia) Liivo Leetma
2020	(Latvia) Dmitrijs Kalašņikovs
2021–2023; 2021–2024	(Estonia) Aivar Anniste (Estonia) Daniel Meijel
2024–2025	(Finland) Teemu Tainio
2025	(Estonia) Alo Bärengrub
2026	(Serbia) Ivan Stojković
2026–	(Estonia) Randin Rande

== Honours ==
=== League ===
- A klass/Liiduklass
  - Winners (2): 1923, 1930
- Esigrupp (Estonian SSR Championship)
  - Winners (1): 1955
- Esiliiga
  - Winners (1): 2011

=== Cup ===
- Estonian Cup
  - Runners-up (1): 1939

== Seasons and statistics ==
=== Seasons ===
Season	Division	Pos	Pld	W	D	L	GF	GA	GD	Pts	Top goalscorer	Cup
1921	Meistriliiga	3-4	Lost the semi-final replay 0–3 vs Sport								(Estonia) Artur Prunn (1)	
1922	Meistriliiga	2	Lost the final 2–4 vs Sport								(Estonia) Eduard Ellmann-Eelma (3)	
1923	Meistriliiga	1	Won the final 6–0 vs Tartu ASK								(Estonia) Ernst Joll (3)	
1924	Meistriliiga	2	Lost in a 4-match final vs Sport								(Estonia) Eduard Ellmann-Eelma (3)	
1925	Meistriliiga	2	Lost the final 0–3 vs Sport								(Estonia) Ervin Fischer (4)	
1926	Meistriliiga	3-4	Lost the semi-final 0–6 vs TJK								(Estonia) Feliks Kull (3)	
1927	Meistriliiga	3-4	Lost the semi-final 1–4 vs TJK								(Estonia) Feliks Kull (3)	
1928	Meistriliiga	did not take part due to a conflict with the Estonian FA										
1929	Meistriliiga	3	5	2	1	2	9	9	0	5	(Estonia) Artur Maurer (4)	
1930	Meistriliiga	1	3	2	1	0	13	1	+12	5	(Estonia) Aleksander Gerassimov-Kalvet (Estonia) Erich Jõers (Estonia) Theodor Strandberg (4)	
1931	Meistriliiga	2	5	3	1	1	9	2	+7	7	(Estonia) Anton Koovit (4)	
1932	Meistriliiga	3	10	5	1	4	16	15	+1	11		
1933	Meistriliiga	4	10	4	0	6	15	30	−15	8	(Estonia) Anton Koovit (6)	
1934	Meistriliiga	5	10	1	1	8	9	35	−26	4		
1935	Meistriliiga	5	7	2	2	3	16	13	+3	6	(Estonia) Johannes Niks (4)	
1936	Meistriliiga	5	14	7	0	7	28	27	+1	14	(Estonia) Johannes Niks (11)	
1937−38	Meistriliiga	3	14	8	2	4	43	26	+17	18	(Estonia) Ralf Veidemann (10)	
1938−39	Meistriliiga	5	14	5	4	5	27	23	+4	14	(Estonia) Johannes Niks (10)	Quarter-finals
1939−40	Meistriliiga	5	14	5	4	5	18	21	−3	14		Runners-up
Estonia was occupied by Soviet Union in 1940, JK Tallinna Kalev was re-established in 2002
2003	III liiga (N)	1	18	14	3	1	56	11	+45	45	(Estonia) Vitali Kosterev (20)	
2004	II liiga (N/E)	1	28	22	3	3	90	32	+58	69	(Estonia) Tiit Tikenberg (27)	
2005	Esiliiga	4	36	18	9	9	85	71	+14	63	(Estonia) Andrei Afanasov (15)	Second round
2006	Esiliiga	3	36	20	6	10	84	63	+21	66	(Estonia) Tiit Tikenberg (16)	Quarter-finals
2007	Meistriliiga	6	36	13	4	19	44	74	−30	43	(Estonia) Tiit Tikenberg (20)	First round
2008	Meistriliiga	8	36	6	8	22	37	70	−33	26	(Estonia) Tiit Tikenberg (10)	Quarter-finals
2009	Meistriliiga	10	36	4	4	28	32	89	−57	16	(Estonia) Vahur Vahtramäe (6)	Fourth round
2010	Esiliiga	5	36	17	6	13	67	65	+2	53	(Estonia) Ilja Monakov (12)	Fourth round
2011	Esiliiga	1	36	21	10	5	102	39	+63	73	(Estonia) Rimo Hunt (35)	Quarter-finals
2012	Meistriliiga	9	36	4	9	23	27	87	−60	21	(Japan) Hiroyuki Mitsuyama (5)	Fourth round
2013	Meistriliiga	8	36	10	4	22	35	77	−42	34	(Estonia) Maksim Paponov (Bosnia and Herzegovina) Aladin Šišić (8)	Second round
2014	Meistriliiga	10	36	3	3	30	21	146	−125	12	(Georgia (country)) Lasha Omanidze (7)	Second round
2015	Esiliiga	5	36	13	7	16	47	59	−12	46	(Estonia) Silver Alex Kelder (13)	Second round
2016	Esiliiga	7	36	13	6	17	56	58	−2	45	(Estonia) Aleksei Belov (13)	First round
2017	Esiliiga	2	36	24	2	10	95	44	+51	74	(Estonia) Andre Järva (21)	Quarter-finals
2018	Meistriliiga	8	36	7	7	22	54	68	−14	28	(Japan) Hidetoshi Wakui (9)	Second round
2019	Meistriliiga	8	36	6	6	24	29	89	−60	24	(Nigeria) Wale Musa Alli (7)	Fourth round
2020	Meistriliiga	10	30	5	5	20	20	68	−48	20	(Estonia) Hannes Anier (8)	Semi-finals
2021	Esiliiga	2	30	21	8	1	78	32	+46	71	(Estonia) Ats Purje (24)	Quarter-finals
2022	Meistriliiga	8	36	10	5	21	42	92	−50	35	(Estonia) Ats Purje (10)	Fourth round
2023	Meistriliiga	3	36	14	11	11	49	41	+8	53	(Estonia) Tristan Toomas Teeväli (10)	Fourth round
2024	Meistriliiga	9	36	8	7	21	37	74	–37	31	(Estonia) Ats Purje (11)	Quarter-finals
2025	Meistriliiga	10	36	5	2	29	32	113	–81	17	(Estonia) Taaniel Usta (13)	Semi-finals

=== Europe ===
Season	Competition	Round	Opponent	Home	Away	Agg.
2024–25	UEFA Conference League	First qualifying round	(Armenia) Urartu	1–2	0–2	1–4
