= Kalev Muru =

Estonian mountaineer

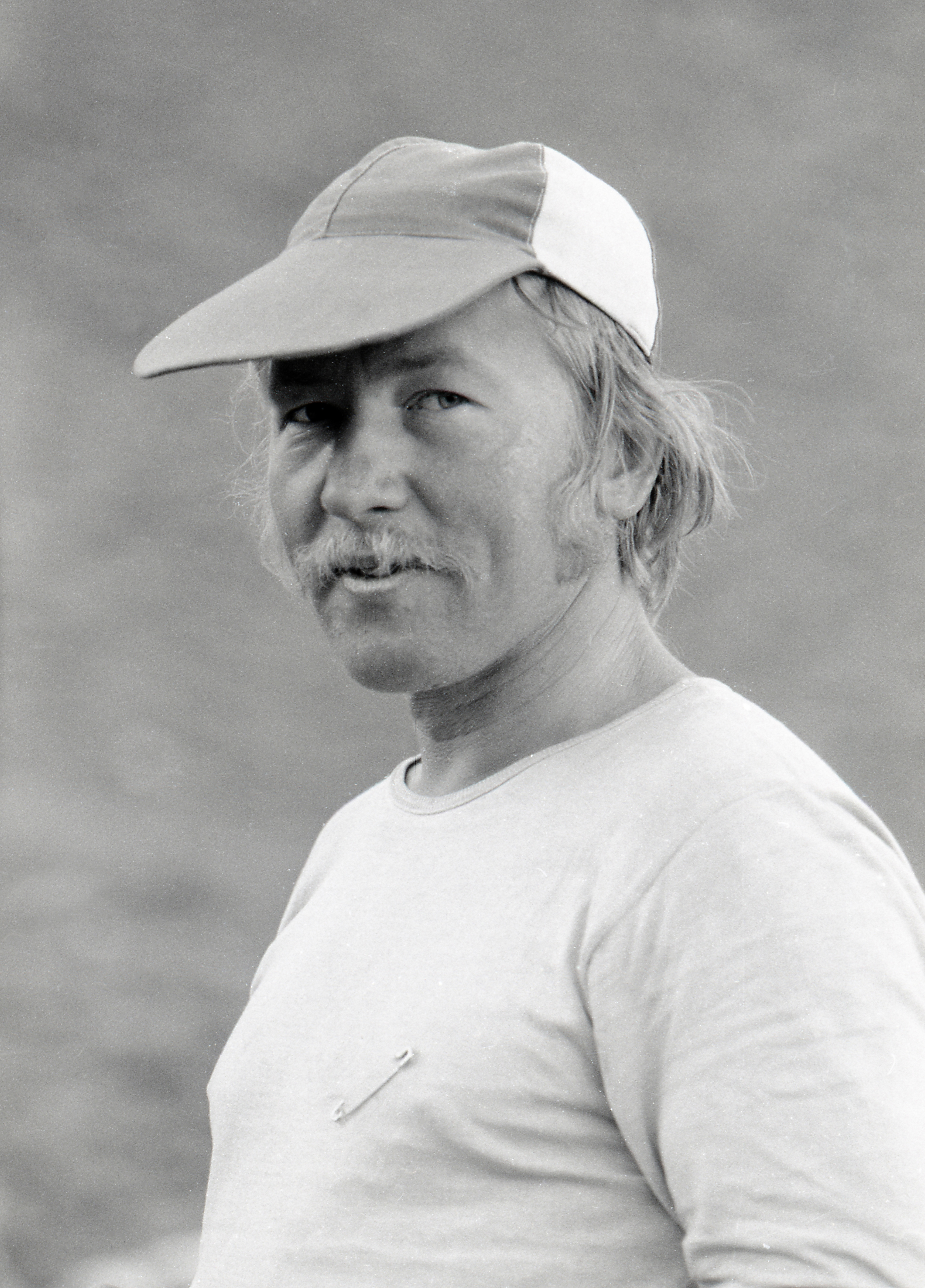
Kalev Muru in 1984

Kalev Muru (born 29 December 1954) is an Estonian mountaineer.

He was born in Tartu. In 1978 he graduated from Tartu State University with a degree in physics.

Since 1974 he has been active in mountaineering. 1976–1989 he was a member of Estonian national mountaineers team. In total, he is surpassed mountains higher than 7000 m in 16 times.

1980–2000 he was the president of Tartu mountaineers' club Firn.

Awards:

- Snow Leopard award
- 2006 (Estonian: Eesti Reservohvitseride Kogu teeneterist)
