= 1923 Estonian Football Championship =

1923 Estonian Championship
Final positions
- Champions: ESS Kalev Tallinn (1st title)

The 1923 Estonian Football Championship was the third top-division football league season in Estonia, organized by the Estonian Football Association. Six teams registered for the Championship, played as a knock-out tournament, but KS Võitleja Narva, SK Türi and Tallinna Jalgpalliklubi withdrew on various reasons leaving only three teams competing. ESS Kalev Tallinn won the championship.

== Semi-finals ==
Date	Team 1	Score	Team 2
Sept 9	ESS Kalev Tallinn	1–0	VS Sport Tallinn
	ASK Tartu	bye	

== Final ==
Date	Team 1	Score	Team 2
Oct 29	ESS Kalev Tallinn	6–0	ASK Tartu

== Top goalscorer ==
- Ernst Joll (ESS Kalev Tallinn) – 3 goals
