= Vaba Maa =

Estonian newspaper

Vaba Maa ('Free Country') was a daily newspaper in Estonia, published from Tallinn. It was the organ of the Estonian Labour Party. Vaba Maa had a circulation of about 50,000 in the early 1920s.

Ants Piip became the editor of Vaba Maa in 1923.

Vaba Maa was owned by Aleksander Weiler.
