= List of Germany international footballers (1–4 caps) =

Players of the Germany national football team with 5 to 19 caps

The Germany national football team played its first international match on 5 April 1908 during the era of the German Empire, losing 5–3 to Switzerland in Basel. The team has been one of the most successful national sides in world football. They won the World Cup in 1954, 1974, 1990 and 2014, as well as the European Championship in 1972, 1980 and 1996. In total, 1,002 players have represented the Germany national team. This list covers players with between one and four caps for the national team organised by the German Football Association, including West Germany. The player are listed in alphabetical order of surname. All statistics are correct up to and including the match played on 16 November 2026 against Netherlands.

== Key ==
Positions key
GK	Goalkeeper
DF	Defender
MF	Midfielder
FW	Forward

Player
This colour background and the * symbol indicate that the player is currently active at the club level.
Position
Playing positions are listed according to the player's primary position while playing for the national team.
Caps and goals
Caps and goals comprise those in the qualifying and final tournaments of the FIFA World Cup and UEFA European Championship, as well as the Summer Olympics (pre-World War II), FIFA Confederations Cup, UEFA Nations League and international friendly matches.

== Players ==
Germany national football team players with between 1 and 4 caps
Player	Pos.	Caps	Goals	Debut		Last or most recent match		Ref.
Player	Pos.	Caps	Goals	Date	Opponent	Date	Opponent	Ref.
Karl Adam	GK	3	0	21 November 1951	Turkey	4 May 1952	Republic of Ireland	
Edmund Adamkiewicz	FW	2	1	1 November 1942	Croatia	22 November 1942	Slovakia	
Jörg Albertz	MF	3	0	21 February 1996	Portugal	5 September 1998	Romania	
Erich Albrecht	FW	1	0	13 March 1909	England Amateurs	13 March 1909	England Amateurs	
Thomas Allofs	FW	2	0	16 October 1985	Portugal	21 September 1988	Soviet Union	
Heinrich Altvater	FW	1	0	26 March 1922	Switzerland	26 March 1922	Switzerland	
Maximilian Arnold *	MF	3	0	13 May 2014	Poland	14 November 2021	Armenia	
Willy Ascherl	MF	1	0	21 April 1924	Netherlands	21 April 1924	Netherlands	
Alfred Au	MF	1	0	18 September 1921	Finland	18 September 1921	Finland	
Karl Auer	FW	3	2	13 January 1924	Austria	20 June 1926	Sweden	
Raimond Aumann	GK	4	0	6 September 1989	Republic of Ireland	10 October 1990	Sweden	
Fritz Bache	DF	2	0	4 November 1923	Norway	31 August 1924	Sweden	
Hanno Balitsch	MF	1	0	12 February 2003	Spain	12 February 2003	Spain	
Fritz Balogh	FW	1	0	22 November 1950	Switzerland	22 November 1950	Switzerland	
Ernst Bantle	FW	1	0	21 September 1924	Hungary	21 September 1924	Hungary	
Karl Barufka	MF	3	0	22 November 1950	Switzerland	23 September 1951	Austria	
Joachim Bäse	DF	1	0	8 May 1968	Wales	8 May 1968	Wales	
Gunther Baumann	MF	2	0	22 November 1950	Switzerland	15 April 1951	Switzerland	
Fritz Baumgarten	GK	1	0	5 April 1908	Switzerland	5 April 1908	Switzerland	
Willy Baumgärtner	FW	4	0	5 April 1908	Switzerland	13 March 1909	England Amateurs	
Erich Bäumler	FW	1	1	13 June 1956	Norway	13 June 1956	Norway	
Mika Baur *	MF	2	0	1 October 2026	Serbia	4 October 2026	Greece	
Peco Bauwens	FW	1	0	16 May 1910	Belgium	16 May 1910	Belgium	
Alfred Beck	FW	1	1	1 December 1954	England	1 December 1954	England	
Fritz Becker	FW	1	2	5 April 1908	Switzerland	5 April 1908	Switzerland	
Hennes Behrens *	MF	1	0	27 September 2026	Greece	27 September 2026	Greece	
Kevin Behrens *	FW	1	0	18 October 2023	Mexico	18 October 2023	Mexico	
Dietmar Beiersdorfer	DF	1	0	1 May 1991	Belgium	1 May 1991	Belgium	
Michael Bella	DF	4	0	18 December 1968	Chile	17 February 1971	Albania	
Armel Bella-Kotchap *	DF	2	0	26 September 2022	England	16 November 2022	Oman	
Walter Berg	MF	1	0	20 March 1938	Luxembourg	20 March 1938	Luxembourg	
Alfred Berghausen	DF	1	0	16 May 1910	Belgium	16 May 1910	Belgium	
Mergim Berisha *	FW	2	0	25 March 2023	Peru	28 March 2023	Belgium	
Robert Bernard	MF	2	0	4 August 1936	Luxembourg	7 August 1936	Norway	
Hans Berndt	FW	3	2	25 June 1937	Latvia	20 March 1938	Hungary	
Rudolf Berthold	MF	1	0	15 April 1928	Switzerland	15 April 1928	Switzerland	
Hans Biallas	FW	3	1	25 September 1938	Romania	25 June 1939	Denmark	
Daniel Bierofka	MF	3	1	9 May 2002	Kuwait	21 August 2002	Bulgaria	
Matthias Billen	FW	1	0	27 September 1936	Luxembourg	27 September 1936	Luxembourg	
Yann Aurel Bisseck *	DF	2	0	23 March 2025	Italy	27 September 2026	Greece	
Hartwig Bleidick	DF	2	0	12 June 1971	Albania	22 June 1971	Norway	
Ernst Blum	MF	1	0	2 October 1927	Denmark	2 October 1927	Denmark	
Wilhelm Blunk	GK	1	0	20 October 1929	Finland	20 October 1929	Finland	
Manfred Bockenfeld	DF	1	0	15 February 1984	Bulgaria	15 February 1984	Bulgaria	
Karl Bögelein	GK	1	0	23 December 1951	Luxembourg	23 December 1951	Luxembourg	
Otto Bökle	FW	1	0	13 October 1935	Latvia	13 October 1935	Latvia	
Albert Bollmann	MF	1	0	5 April 1914	Netherlands	5 April 1914	Netherlands	
Hannes Bongartz	MF	4	0	28 February 1976	Malta	7 September 1977	Finland	
Walter Borck	GK	1	0	17 December 1911	Hungary	17 December 1911	Hungary	
Kurt Borkenhagen	DF	1	0	5 October 1952	France	5 October 1952	France	
Dieter Brenninger	FW	1	0	10 May 1969	Austria	10 May 1969	Austria	
Theo Breuer	MF	2	0	22 October 1933	Belgium	5 November 1933	Norway	
Andreas Breynck	FW	1	0	16 May 1910	Belgium	16 May 1910	Belgium	
Hans-Günter Bruns	MF	4	0	29 February 1984	Belgium	12 September 1984	Argentina	
Lothar Budzinski-Kreth	MF	1	0	16 May 1910	Belgium	16 May 1910	Belgium	
Otto Bülte	MF	1	0	16 October 1910	Netherlands	16 October 1910	Netherlands	
Manfred Burgsmüller	FW	3	0	16 November 1977	Switzerland	22 February 1978	England	
Theodor Burkhardt	DF	1	0	28 September 1930	Hungary	28 September 1930	Hungary	
Hans-Jörg Butt	GK	4	0	7 June 2000	Liechtenstein	10 July 2010	Uruguay	
Walter Claus-Oehler	MF	2	1	10 May 1923	Netherlands	12 August 1923	Finland	
Nnamdi Collins *	DF	1	0	4 September 2025	Slovakia	4 September 2025	Slovakia	
Marvin Compper	DF	1	0	19 November 2008	England	19 November 2008	England	
Bambasé Conté *	MF	3	0	27 September 2026	Greece	4 October 2026	Greece	
Mahmoud Dahoud *	MF	2	0	7 October 2020	Turkey	11 November 2020	Czech Republic	
Ludwig Damminger	FW	3	5	28 April 1935	Belgium	15 September 1935	Estonia	
Fritz Deike	MF	1	0	25 August 1935	Romania	25 August 1935	Romania	
Karl Del'Haye	FW	2	0	2 April 1980	Austria	17 June 1980	Greece	
Kerem Demirbay *	MF	2	1	6 June 2017	Denmark	25 June 2017	Cameroon	
Diego Demme *	MF	1	0	10 June 2017	San Marino	10 June 2017	San Marino	
Jupp Derwall	FW	2	0	1 December 1954	England	19 December 1954	Portugal	
Erwin Deyhle	GK	1	0	29 June 1939	Estonia	29 June 1939	Estonia	
Kurt Diemer	DF	4	0	6 October 1912	Denmark	18 May 1913	Switzerland	
Peter Dietrich	MF	1	0	9 May 1970	Republic of Ireland	9 May 1970	Republic of Ireland	
Heinz Ditgens	DF	3	0	4 August 1936	Luxembourg	20 March 1938	Luxembourg	
Mustafa Doğan	DF	2	0	30 July 1999	United States	9 October 1999	Turkey	
Friedo Dörfel	FW	2	1	12 April 1942	Spain	3 May 1942	Hungary	
Herbert Dörner	MF	2	0	13 June 1956	Norway	30 June 1956	Sweden	
Rudolf Droz	FW	1	0	18 June 1911	Sweden	18 June 1911	Sweden	
Marvin Ducksch *	FW	2	0	18 November 2023	Turkey	21 November 2023	Austria	
Otto Dumke	FW	2	3	18 June 1911	Sweden	29 October 1911	Sweden	
Edwin Dutton	FW	1	0	4 April 1909	Hungary	4 April 1909	Hungary	
Walter Dzur	MF	3	0	1 September 1940	Finland	5 October 1941	Finland	
Younes Ebnoutalib *	FW	3	0	24 September 2026	Netherlands	16 November 2026	Netherlands	
Jakob Eckert	FW	1	0	2 May 1937	Switzerland	2 May 1937	Switzerland	
Kurt Ehrmann	FW	1	0	20 April 1952	Luxembourg	20 April 1952	Luxembourg	
Fritz Eiberle	MF	1	0	19 November 1933	Switzerland	19 November 1933	Switzerland	
Paul Eichelmann	GK	2	0	20 April 1908	England Amateurs	7 June 1908	Austria	
Ernst Eikhof	MF	3	0	10 May 1923	Netherlands	12 August 1923	Finland	
Saïd El Mala *	MF	3	0	1 October 2026	Serbia	13 November 2026	Serbia	
Heinz Emmerich	DF	3	0	17 June 1931	Sweden	13 September 1931	Austria	
Marco Engelhardt	MF	3	0	16 December 2004	Japan	21 June 2005	Argentina	
Yannik Engelhardt *	MF	1	0	24 September 2026	Netherlands	24 September 2026	Netherlands	
Hermann Eppenhoff	FW	3	3	15 September 1940	Slovakia	1 February 1942	Switzerland	
Albert Eschenlohr	MF	1	0	31 August 1924	Sweden	31 August 1924	Sweden	
Franz Esser	FW	1	0	2 July 1922	Hungary	2 July 1922	Hungary	
Georg Euler	FW	1	0	13 September 1936	Poland	13 September 1936	Poland	
Fritz Ewert	GK	4	0	21 October 1959	Netherlands	1 January 1964	Algeria	
Robert Faas	GK	1	0	16 May 1910	Belgium	16 May 1910	Belgium	
Helmut Faeder	MF	1	0	28 December 1958	United Arab Republic	28 December 1958	United Arab Republic	
Frank Fahrenhorst	DF	2	0	18 August 2004	Austria	8 September 2004	Brazil	
Wilhelm Falk	DF	1	0	20 November 1927	Netherlands	20 November 1927	Netherlands	
Ralf Falkenmayer	MF	4	0	12 September 1984	Argentina	9 April 1986	Switzerland	
Malik Fathi	DF	2	0	16 August 2006	Sweden	7 October 2006	Georgia	
Diethelm Ferner	MF	2	0	29 December 1963	Morocco	1 January 1964	Algeria	
Willi Fick	FW	1	1	24 April 1910	Netherlands	24 April 1910	Netherlands	
Leo Fiederer	FW	1	0	24 October 1920	Hungary	24 October 1920	Hungary	
Erich Fischer	FW	2	0	1 July 1932	Finland	19 March 1933	France	
Paul Fischer	DF	1	0	20 April 1908	England Amateurs	20 April 1908	England Amateurs	
Willy Fitz	MF	1	0	1 February 1942	Switzerland	1 February 1942	Switzerland	
Hans Fleischmann	FW	1	0	23 November 1924	Italy	23 November 1924	Italy	
Hermann Flick	MF	1	0	20 October 1929	Finland	20 October 1929	Finland	
Karl Flink	MF	1	0	2 July 1922	Hungary	2 July 1922	Hungary	
Heinz Flotho	GK	1	0	26 March 1939	Luxembourg	26 March 1939	Luxembourg	
Franco Foda	MF	2	0	12 December 1987	Brazil	16 December 1987	Argentina	
Paul Forell	MF	1	0	24 October 1920	Hungary	24 October 1920	Hungary	
Georg Frank	FW	4	5	2 October 1927	Denmark	2 March 1930	Italy	
Willi Fricke	FW	1	0	18 August 1935	Luxembourg	18 August 1935	Luxembourg	
Georg Friedel	FW	1	0	31 January 1937	Netherlands	31 January 1937	Netherlands	
Adalbert Friedrich	FW	1	0	16 May 1910	Belgium	16 May 1910	Belgium	
Walter Fritzsche	DF	1	0	5 May 1921	Austria	5 May 1921	Austria	
Wolfgang Funkel	DF	2	0	14 May 1986	Netherlands	29 October 1986	Austria	
Fritz Fürst	FW	1	0	18 May 1913	Switzerland	18 May 1913	Switzerland	
Max Gablonsky	FW	4	1	16 May 1910	Belgium	29 October 1911	Sweden	
Arthur Gaebelein	FW	1	0	17 November 1912	Netherlands	17 November 1912	Netherlands	
Hermann Garrn	FW	2	0	7 June 1908	Austria	13 March 1909	England Amateurs	
Ludwig Gärtner	FW	3	1	27 August 1939	Slovakia	5 October 1941	Sweden	
Richard Gedlich	FW	2	0	18 April 1926	Netherlands	2 October 1927	Denmark	
Paul Gehlhaar	GK	2	0	30 September 1928	Sweden	24 May 1931	Austria	
Adolf Gehrts	FW	2	0	20 April 1908	England Amateurs	24 April 1910	Netherlands	
Heiko Gerber	DF	2	0	24 July 1999	Brazil	30 July 1999	United States	
Willi Gerdau	DF	1	0	22 May 1957	Scotland	22 May 1957	Scotland	
Yannick Gerhardt *	MF	1	0	15 November 2016	Italy	15 November 2016	Italy	
Felix Gerritzen	FW	4	1	15 April 1951	Switzerland	17 October 1951	Republic of Ireland	
Bernd Gersdorff	MF	1	0	3 September 1975	Austria	3 September 1975	Austria	
Reiner Geye	FW	4	1	15 November 1972	Switzerland	20 November 1974	Greece	
Erich Goede	MF	1	0	3 December 1939	Slovakia	3 December 1939	Slovakia	
Andreas Görlitz	DF	2	0	8 September 2004	Brazil	9 October 2004	Iran	
Armin Görtz	MF	2	0	27 April 1988	Switzerland	31 August 1988	Finland	
Richard Gottinger	MF	1	0	11 October 1953	Saar	11 October 1953	Saar	
Hermann Gramlich	DF	3	0	18 August 1935	Luxembourg	15 September 1935	Poland	
Jürgen Groh	DF	2	0	26 May 1979	Iceland	7 September 1983	Hungary	
Emil Gröner	FW	1	0	5 June 1921	Hungary	5 June 1921	Hungary	
Wilhelm Gros	MF	1	0	24 March 1912	Netherlands	24 March 1912	Netherlands	
Volkmar Groß	GK	1	0	22 November 1970	Greece	22 November 1970	Greece	
Peter Grosser	MF	2	0	26 September 1965	Sweden	7 May 1966	Northern Ireland	
Hans Gruber	MF	1	0	1 June 1929	Scotland	1 June 1929	Scotland	
Brajan Gruda *	MF	2	2	13 November 2026	Serbia	16 November 2026	Netherlands	
Heinz Gründel	MF	4	0	16 October 1985	Portugal	14 May 1986	Netherlands	
Walter Günther	FW	4	2	18 August 1935	Luxembourg	31 January 1937	Netherlands	
Marco Haber	MF	2	0	23 August 1995	Belgium	15 December 1995	South Africa	
Hans Haferkamp	FW	4	2	17 June 1951	Turkey	20 April 1952	Luxembourg	
Martin Haftmann	FW	1	0	2 October 1927	Denmark	2 October 1927	Denmark	
André Hahn	MF	1	0	13 May 2014	Poland	13 May 2014	Poland	
Franz Hammerl	MF	1	0	20 October 1940	Bulgaria	20 October 1940	Bulgaria	
Erich Hänel	FW	3	1	26 March 1939	Luxembourg	3 December 1939	Slovakia	
Richard Hanke	FW	1	1	2 November 1930	Norway	2 November 1930	Norway	
Karl Hanssen	FW	3	0	16 October 1910	Netherlands	23 April 1911	Belgium	
Otto Hantschick	DF	2	0	20 April 1908	England Amateurs	13 March 1909	England Amateurs	
Carl Hartmann	FW	4	2	10 May 1923	Netherlands	31 August 1924	Sweden	
Michael Hartmann	DF	4	0	30 April 2003	Serbia and Montenegro	6 September 2003	Iceland	
Jimmy Hartwig	MF	2	0	22 May 1979	Republic of Ireland	26 May 1979	Iceland	
Hans Heibach	MF	1	0	20 March 1938	Luxembourg	20 March 1938	Luxembourg	
Hartmut Heidemann	DF	3	0	12 October 1966	Turkey	17 April 1968	Switzerland	
Matthias Heidemann	FW	3	0	19 November 1933	Switzerland	13 October 1935	Latvia	
Horst Heldt	MF	2	0	28 April 1999	Scotland	30 July 1999	United States	
Robert Hense	DF	1	0	16 October 1910	Netherlands	16 October 1910	Netherlands	
Gustav Hensel	FW	1	0	5 April 1908	Switzerland	5 April 1908	Switzerland	
Sepp Herberger	FW	3	2	18 September 1921	Finland	29 March 1925	Netherlands	
Günter Hermann	MF	2	0	21 September 1988	Soviet Union	30 May 1990	Denmark	
Patrick Herrmann	MF	2	0	10 June 2015	United States	13 June 2015	Gibraltar	
Ingo Hertzsch	DF	2	0	15 November 2000	Denmark	21 August 2002	Bulgaria	
Holger Hieronymus	DF	3	0	2 September 1981	Poland	13 October 1982	England	
Arthur Hiller	MF	4	0	5 April 1908	Switzerland	4 April 1909	Switzerland	
Marius Hiller	FW	3	1	3 April 1910	Switzerland	10 September 1911	Austria	
Herbert Hirth	DF	1	0	4 April 1909	Hungary	4 April 1909	Hungary	
Bernd Hobsch	FW	1	0	22 September 1993	Tunisia	22 September 1993	Tunisia	
Christian Hochstätter	MF	2	0	12 December 1987	Brazil	16 December 1987	Argentina	
Franz Hofer	FW	1	0	27 August 1939	Slovakia	27 August 1939	Slovakia	
Rudi Hoffmann	MF	1	0	28 May 1955	Republic of Ireland	28 May 1955	Republic of Ireland	
Ludwig Hofmeister	GK	2	0	17 November 1912	Netherlands	5 April 1914	Netherlands	
Johann Hofstätter	MF	1	0	14 April 1940	Yugoslavia	14 April 1940	Yugoslavia	
Karl Höger	FW	4	0	5 June 1921	Hungary	14 December 1924	Switzerland	
Lewis Holtby	MF	3	0	17 November 2010	Sweden	14 November 2012	Netherlands	
Friedel Holz	FW	1	0	20 March 1938	Luxembourg	20 March 1938	Luxembourg	
Franz Horn	FW	3	0	16 September 1928	Denmark	20 October 1929	Finland	
Thomas Hörster	DF	4	0	24 September 1986	Denmark	25 March 1987	Israel	
Adolf Höschle	DF	1	0	27 June 1920	Switzerland	27 June 1920	Switzerland	
Alfred Huber	FW	1	0	4 May 1930	Switzerland	4 May 1930	Switzerland	
Lorenz Huber	DF	1	0	30 October 1932	Hungary	30 October 1932	Hungary	
Eduard Hundt	DF	3	0	22 October 1933	Belgium	11 March 1934	Luxembourg	
Aaron Hunt	MF	3	0	18 November 2009	Ivory Coast	29 May 2013	Ecuador	
Willi Hutter	FW	2	0	18 September 1921	Finland	26 March 1922	Switzerland	
Eberhardt Illmer	GK	1	0	4 April 1909	Switzerland	4 April 1909	Switzerland	
Franz Immig	DF	2	0	26 March 1939	Luxembourg	27 August 1939	Slovakia	
Franz Islacker	FW	1	0	16 October 1954	France	16 October 1954	France	
Günter Jäger	DF	1	0	24 September 1958	Denmark	24 September 1958	Denmark	
Johannes Jakobs	MF	1	0	29 June 1939	Estonia	29 June 1939	Estonia	
Vitaly Janelt *	MF	1	0	1 October 2026	Serbia	1 October 2026	Serbia	
Franz Jelinek	FW	1	0	15 September 1940	Slovakia	15 September 1940	Slovakia	
Finn Jeltsch *	DF	1	0	26 November 2026	Netherlands	26 November 2026	Netherlands	
Jermaine Jones	MF	3	0	6 February 2008	Austria	19 November 2008	England	
Karl Joppich	MF	1	0	30 October 1932	Hungary	30 October 1932	Hungary	
Ernst Jordan	DF	1	0	5 April 1908	Switzerland	5 April 1908	Switzerland	
Sebastian Jung *	DF	1	0	13 May 2014	Poland	13 May 2014	Poland	
Otto Jungtow	MF	1	0	21 March 1913	England Amateurs	21 March 1913	England Amateurs	
Matthias Kaburek	FW	1	0	27 August 1939	Slovakia	27 August 1939	Slovakia	
Helmut Kapitulski	FW	1	0	19 November 1958	Austria	19 November 1958	Austria	
Rudi Kargus	GK	3	0	20 December 1975	Turkey	30 April 1977	Yugoslavia	
Gerhard Kaufhold	MF	1	0	1 December 1954	England	1 December 1954	England	
Ferdinand Keller	FW	1	0	3 September 1975	Austria	3 September 1975	Austria	
Walter Kelsch	FW	4	3	1 April 1979	Turkey	27 February 1980	Malta	
Georg Kießling	MF	2	1	2 October 1927	Denmark	23 September 1928	Norway	
Willi Kirsei	FW	1	0	31 August 1924	Sweden	31 August 1924	Sweden	
Werner Klaas	DF	1	0	21 March 1937	Luxembourg	21 March 1937	Luxembourg	
Uwe Kliemann	DF	1	0	17 May 1975	Netherlands	17 May 1975	Netherlands	
Eugen Kling	DF	1	0	2 October 1927	Denmark	2 October 1927	Denmark	
Theo Klöckner	FW	2	0	28 December 1958	United Arab Republic	20 May 1959	Poland	
Sven Kmetsch	MF	2	0	10 September 1997	Armenia	18 February 1998	Oman	
Willi Knesebeck	MF	2	0	17 December 1911	Hungary	6 October 1912	Denmark	
Willi Köchling	DF	1	0	23 December 1956	Belgium	23 December 1956	Belgium	
Theo Koenen	DF	1	0	17 December 1911	Hungary	17 December 1911	Hungary	
Ludwig Kögl	MF	2	0	15 June 1985	Mexico	17 November 1985	Czechoslovakia	
Georg Köhl	GK	1	0	21 March 1937	Luxembourg	21 March 1937	Luxembourg	
Harald Konopka	DF	2	0	14 June 1978	Italy	26 May 1979	Iceland	
Emil Köpplinger	MF	1	0	23 October 1927	Norway	23 October 1927	Norway	
Heinz Kördell	MF	1	0	28 December 1958	United Arab Republic	28 December 1958	United Arab Republic	
Willi Koslowski	FW	3	1	11 April 1962	Uruguay	30 September 1962	Yugoslavia	
Erwin Kostedde	FW	3	0	22 December 1974	Malta	11 October 1975	Greece	
Emil Krause	DF	1	0	3 December 1933	Poland	3 December 1933	Poland	
Willy Krauß	MF	2	0	26 March 1911	Switzerland	14 April 1912	Hungary	
Anton Kreß	FW	1	0	5 June 1921	Hungary	5 June 1921	Hungary	
Georg Krogmann	MF	3	0	14 April 1912	Hungary	3 July 1912	Hungary	
Thomas Kroth	MF	1	0	29 January 1985	Hungary	29 January 1985	Hungary	
Kurt Krüger	MF	1	0	14 July 1940	Romania	14 July 1940	Romania	
Franz Krumm	FW	2	1	25 September 1932	Sweden	1 January 1933	Italy	
Heinz Kubsch	GK	3	0	25 April 1954	Switzerland	21 November 1956	Switzerland	
Richard Kubus	DF	1	0	3 December 1939	Slovakia	3 December 1939	Slovakia	
Paul Kugler	MF	2	0	29 October 1911	Sweden	18 May 1913	Switzerland	
Paul Kühnle	DF	2	0	3 April 1910	Switzerland	26 March 1911	Switzerland	
Werner Kuhnt	GK	1	0	31 August 1924	Sweden	31 August 1924	Sweden	
Willi Kund	MF	2	1	7 September 1930	Denmark	13 September 1931	Austria	
Heinz Kwiatkowski	GK	4	0	20 June 1954	Hungary	28 June 1958	France	
Fritz Laband	DF	4	0	25 April 1954	Switzerland	27 June 1954	Yugoslavia	
Bruno Labbadia	FW	2	0	20 December 1992	Uruguay	23 August 1995	Belgium	
Kurt Langenbein	MF	2	1	6 March 1932	Switzerland	13 October 1935	Latvia	
Herbert Laumen	FW	2	1	6 March 1968	Belgium	8 May 1968	Wales	
Rudolf Leip	MF	3	0	12 August 1923	Finland	31 August 1924	Sweden	
Willi Lindner	MF	1	0	19 March 1933	France	19 March 1933	France	
Otto Löble	FW	4	0	4 April 1909	Switzerland	21 March 1913	England Amateurs	
Hans Lohneis	DF	1	0	26 September 1920	Austria	26 September 1920	Austria	
Theodor Lohrmann	GK	3	0	24 October 1920	Hungary	2 July 1922	Hungary	
Heinz Ludewig	MF	1	0	5 April 1914	Netherlands	5 April 1914	Netherlands	
Johann Ludwig	FW	3	2	28 September 1930	Hungary	21 June 1931	Norway	
Karl Ludwig	MF	1	0	5 April 1908	Switzerland	5 April 1908	Switzerland	
Josef Lüke	FW	2	0	10 May 1923	Netherlands	12 August 1923	Finland	
Hermann Lux	DF	3	0	31 August 1924	Sweden	26 June 1925	Finland	
Erich Maas	FW	3	0	6 March 1968	Belgium	8 April 1970	Romania	
Alexander Madlung	DF	2	0	7 October 2006	Georgia	28 March 2007	Denmark	
Carl-Heinz Mahlmann	MF	1	0	4 December 1932	Netherlands	4 December 1932	Netherlands	
Richard Malik	FW	2	1	30 October 1932	Hungary	1 January 1933	Italy	
Hellmut Maneval	MF	1	0	10 May 1923	Netherlands	10 May 1923	Netherlands	
Manfred Manglitz	GK	4	0	13 March 1965	Italy	13 May 1970	Yugoslavia	
Otto Marischka	DF	1	0	27 August 1939	Slovakia	27 August 1939	Slovakia	
Arthur Marohn	MF	1	0	5 June 1921	Hungary	5 June 1921	Hungary	
Bernd Martin	DF	1	0	2 May 1979	Wales	2 May 1979	Wales	
Alexander Martinek	GK	1	0	14 July 1940	Romania	14 July 1940	Romania	
Josef Marx	FW	1	1	3 August 1960	Iceland	3 August 1960	Iceland	
Erich Massini	DF	1	0	13 March 1909	England Amateurs	13 March 1909	England Amateurs	
Paul Mathies	MF	2	0	15 September 1935	Estonia	13 October 1935	Latvia	
Paul Matthes	FW	1	0	20 April 1908	England Amateurs	20 April 1908	England Amateurs	
Paul Mauch	GK	1	0	23 April 1922	Austria	23 April 1922	Austria	
Ronald Maul	DF	2	0	24 July 1999	Brazil	30 July 1999	United States	
Matthias Mauritz	MF	1	0	20 May 1959	Poland	20 May 1959	Poland	
Martin Max	FW	1	0	17 April 2002	Argentina	17 April 2002	Argentina	
Heinrich Mechling	FW	2	1	5 May 1912	Switzerland	18 May 1913	Switzerland	
Paul Mehl	MF	2	0	4 August 1936	Luxembourg	13 September 1936	Poland	
Kurt Meißner	FW	1	0	23 November 1924	Italy	23 November 1924	Italy	
Caspar Memering	MF	3	0	22 May 1979	Republic of Ireland	17 June 1980	Greece	
Hans Mengel	MF	1	0	20 March 1938	Hungary	20 March 1938	Hungary	
Max Merkel	DF	1	0	27 August 1939	Slovakia	27 August 1939	Slovakia	
Karl-Heinz Metzner	MF	2	0	28 December 1952	Spain	11 October 1953	Saar	
Max Meyer *	MF	4	1	13 May 2014	Poland	11 November 2016	San Marino	
Peter Meyer	FW	1	0	17 December 1967	Albania	17 December 1967	Albania	
Jürgen Milewski	FW	3	0	18 November 1981	Albania	28 March 1984	Soviet Union	
Jakob Miltz	FW	2	0	19 December 1954	Portugal	25 November 1956	Republic of Ireland	
Otto Montag	FW	4	0	3 June 1923	Switzerland	26 June 1925	Finland	
Youssoufa Moukoko *	FW	2	0	16 November 2022	Oman	23 November 2022	Japan	
Ernst Müller	MF	1	0	24 May 1931	Austria	24 May 1931	Austria	
Friedrich Müller	FW	2	0	26 April 1931	Netherlands	24 May 1931	Austria	
Nicolai Müller	MF	2	0	29 May 2013	Ecuador	2 June 2013	United States	
Rudolf Nafziger	MF	1	0	9 October 1965	Austria	9 October 1965	Austria	
Ernst Nagelschmitz	MF	1	0	18 April 1926	Netherlands	18 April 1926	Netherlands	
Hermann Neiße	DF	3	0	16 October 1910	Netherlands	23 April 1911	Belgium	
Frank Neubarth	FW	1	0	2 April 1988	Argentina	2 April 1988	Argentina	
Willi Neuberger	MF	2	0	8 May 1968	Wales	16 June 1968	Brazil	
Robert Neumaier	DF	3	0	4 April 1909	Switzerland	5 May 1912	Switzerland	
Arno Neumann	FW	1	0	20 April 1908	England Amateurs	20 April 1908	England Amateurs	
Herbert Neumann	MF	1	0	22 February 1978	England	22 February 1978	England	
Leopold Neumer	FW	1	0	9 June 1938	Switzerland	9 June 1938	Switzerland	
Hans Neuschäfer	MF	1	1	21 November 1956	Switzerland	21 November 1956	Switzerland	
Roman Neustädter	MF	2	0	14 November 2012	Netherlands	29 May 2013	Ecuador	
Bernd Nickel	MF	1	0	22 December 1974	Malta	22 December 1974	Malta	
Harald Nickel	FW	3	0	21 November 1979	Soviet Union	27 February 1980	Malta	
Otto Nicodemus	DF	1	0	4 April 1909	Switzerland	4 April 1909	Switzerland	
Max Niederbacher	MF	1	0	21 June 1925	Sweden	21 June 1925	Sweden	
Kurt Niedermayer	DF	1	0	11 October 1980	Netherlands	11 October 1980	Netherlands	
Rudolf Noack	FW	3	1	14 January 1934	Hungary	2 May 1937	Switzerland	
Peter Nogly	DF	4	0	23 February 1977	France	14 June 1977	Mexico	
Alexander Nübel *	GK	4	0	11 October 2024	Bosnia and Herzegovina	27 September 2026	Greece	
Richard Oehm	MF	3	0	25 September 1932	Sweden	11 March 1934	Luxembourg	
Rainer Ohlhauser	FW	1	0	18 December 1968	Chile	18 December 1968	Chile	
Werner Olk	DF	1	0	8 October 1961	Poland	8 October 1961	Poland	
Frank Ordenewitz	MF	2	0	12 December 1987	Brazil	16 December 1987	Argentina	
Assan Ouédraogo *	MF	1	1	17 November 2025	Slovakia	17 November 2025	Slovakia	
Christian Pander	DF	2	1	22 August 2007	England	8 September 2007	Wales	
Herbert Panse	MF	1	1	13 October 1935	Latvia	13 October 1935	Latvia	
Stephan Paßlack	DF	4	1	9 October 1996	Armenia	5 September 1998	Romania	
Josef Pekarek	MF	1	0	27 August 1939	Slovakia	27 August 1939	Slovakia	
Eduard Pendorf	MF	3	0	21 March 1913	England Amateurs	23 April 1922	Austria	
Wolfgang Peters	FW	1	0	20 November 1957	Sweden	20 November 1957	Sweden	
Nils Petersen	FW	2	0	2 June 2018	Austria	9 September 2018	Peru	
Michael Pfeiffer	MF	1	0	1 December 1954	England	1 December 1954	England	
Karlheinz Pflipsen	MF	1	0	13 June 1993	United States	13 June 1993	United States	
Ludwig Philipp	MF	2	0	3 April 1910	Switzerland	24 April 1910	Netherlands	
Alfred Picard	MF	1	0	26 March 1939	Luxembourg	26 March 1939	Luxembourg	
Josef Pirrung	MF	2	0	20 November 1974	Greece	22 December 1974	Malta	
Peter Platzer	GK	2	0	29 January 1939	Belgium	26 March 1939	Italy	
Ernst Plener	FW	2	2	14 July 1940	Romania	1 September 1940	Finland	
Ernst Poertgen	FW	3	5	20 October 1935	Bulgaria	21 March 1937	Luxembourg	
Ernst Poetsch	MF	3	0	7 June 1908	Austria	24 April 1910	Netherlands	
Erich Pohl	MF	2	0	10 May 1923	Netherlands	12 August 1923	Finland	
Herbert Pohl	FW	2	0	5 October 1941	Finland	7 December 1941	Slovakia	
Ludwig Pöhler	MF	1	0	26 March 1939	Luxembourg	26 March 1939	Luxembourg	
Karl Politz	FW	1	0	14 January 1934	Hungary	14 January 1934	Hungary	
Walter Poppe	MF	1	0	20 April 1908	England Amateurs	20 April 1908	England Amateurs	
Ingo Porges	MF	1	0	11 May 1960	Republic of Ireland	11 May 1960	Republic of Ireland	
Fritz Pott	DF	3	0	24 October 1962	France	29 April 1964	Czechoslovakia	
Alfred Preissler	FW	2	0	23 September 1951	Austria	17 October 1951	Republic of Ireland	
Alfred Pyka	DF	1	0	28 December 1958	United Arab Republic	28 December 1958	United Arab Republic	
Richard Queck	FW	3	2	4 April 1909	Hungary	5 April 1914	Netherlands	
Hans Rebele	FW	2	0	26 May 1965	Switzerland	26 March 1969	Wales	
Oliver Reck	GK	1	0	4 June 1996	Liechtenstein	4 June 1996	Liechtenstein	
Theodor Redder	DF	1	0	7 June 1964	Finland	7 June 1964	Finland	
Hans Reese	DF	1	0	1 July 1912	Russia	1 July 1912	Russia	
Marco Reich	FW	1	0	9 February 1999	Colombia	9 February 1999	Colombia	
Peter Reichel	DF	2	0	20 December 1975	Turkey	24 April 1976	Spain	
Stefan Reinartz	MF	3	0	13 May 2010	Malta	2 June 2013	United States	
Uwe Reinders	FW	4	1	12 May 1982	Norway	2 July 1982	Spain	
Alois Reinhardt	DF	4	0	31 May 1989	Wales	28 February 1990	France	
Baptist Reinmann	MF	4	0	23 October 1927	Norway	10 February 1929	Switzerland	
Otto Reiser	MF	1	0	23 April 1911	Belgium	23 April 1911	Belgium	
Otto Reislant	MF	1	0	16 May 1910	Belgium	16 May 1910	Belgium	
Martin Reißmann	MF	1	0	4 November 1923	Norway	4 November 1923	Norway	
Ernst Reitermaier	FW	1	0	27 August 1939	Slovakia	27 August 1939	Slovakia	
Willy Reitgaßl	FW	1	1	3 August 1960	Iceland	3 August 1960	Iceland	
Fritz Retter	MF	1	0	26 March 1922	Switzerland	26 March 1922	Switzerland	
Leopold Richter	MF	1	0	4 April 1909	Hungary	4 April 1909	Hungary	
Lothar Richter	DF	1	0	5 October 1941	Finland	5 October 1941	Finland	
Franz Riegler	FW	2	0	7 December 1941	Slovakia	18 January 1942	Croatia	
Sascha Riether	DF	2	0	11 August 2010	Denmark	7 September 2010	Azerbaijan	
Karl Ringel	FW	1	0	28 December 1958	United Arab Republic	28 December 1958	United Arab Republic	
Hans Riso	GK	1	0	3 April 1910	Switzerland	3 April 1910	Switzerland	
Heinrich Riso	DF	2	0	7 June 1908	Austria	4 April 1909	Hungary	
Manfred Ritschel	MF	3	1	12 March 1975	England	17 May 1975	Netherlands	
Oskar Ritter	FW	1	0	21 June 1925	Sweden	21 June 1925	Sweden	
Thomas Ritter	DF	1	0	13 October 1993	Uruguay	13 October 1993	Uruguay	
Walter Rodekamp	FW	3	1	12 May 1965	England	6 June 1965	Brazil	
Josef Rodzinski	MF	3	0	13 September 1936	Poland	17 October 1936	Irish Free State	
Oskar Rohr	FW	4	5	6 March 1932	Switzerland	19 March 1933	France	
Ernst Rokosch	DF	1	0	5 April 1914	Netherlands	5 April 1914	Netherlands	
Helmut Roleder	GK	1	0	28 March 1984	Soviet Union	28 March 1984	Soviet Union	
Gustav Roller	DF	1	0	21 September 1924	Hungary	21 September 1924	Hungary	
Walter Rose	MF	1	0	29 August 1937	Estonia	29 August 1937	Estonia	
Frank Rost	GK	4	0	27 March 2002	United States	11 June 2003	Faroe Islands	
Franz Roth	MF	4	0	7 October 1967	Yugoslavia	22 November 1970	Greece	
Hans Ruch	FW	3	2	21 June 1925	Sweden	1 June 1929	Scotland	
Fritz Ruchay	MF	1	0	13 October 1935	Latvia	13 October 1935	Latvia	
Michael Rummenigge	MF	2	0	26 October 1983	Turkey	29 October 1986	Austria	
Bernd Rupp	FW	1	1	12 October 1966	Turkey	12 October 1966	Turkey	
Willi Rutz	FW	1	1	1 July 1932	Finland	1 July 1932	Finland	
Ernst Sabeditsch	MF	1	0	27 August 1939	Slovakia	27 August 1939	Slovakia	
August Sackenheim	FW	4	2	20 October 1929	Finland	21 June 1931	Norway	
Horst Schade	FW	3	1	15 April 1951	Switzerland	11 October 1953	Saar	
Erwin Schädler	MF	4	0	21 March 1937	Luxembourg	20 March 1938	Luxembourg	
Herbert Schäfer	MF	1	0	20 November 1957	Sweden	20 November 1957	Sweden	
Max Schäfer	DF	1	0	14 January 1934	Hungary	14 January 1934	Hungary	
Reinhard Schaletzki	MF	2	1	22 June 1939	Norway	29 June 1939	Estonia	
Derry Scherhant *	MF	4	1	1 October 2026	Serbia	16 November 2026	Netherlands	
Karl Scherm	FW	2	1	31 October 1926	Netherlands	12 December 1926	Switzerland	
Christian Schilling	FW	2	0	16 May 1910	Belgium	16 October 1910	Netherlands	
Jan Schlaudraff	FW	3	0	7 October 2006	Georgia	28 March 2007	Denmark	
Elwin Schlebrowski	MF	2	0	25 November 1956	Republic of Ireland	23 December 1956	Belgium	
Robert Schlienz	MF	3	0	28 May 1955	Republic of Ireland	26 May 1956	England	
Karl Schlösser	FW	1	1	26 April 1931	Netherlands	26 April 1931	Netherlands	
Christian Schmidt	GK	3	0	24 April 1910	Netherlands	18 May 1913	Switzerland	
Hans Schmidt	FW	1	0	7 June 1908	Austria	7 June 1908	Austria	
Josef Schmitt	MF	2	1	16 September 1928	Denmark	23 September 1928	Norway	
Georg Schneider	DF	3	0	27 June 1920	Switzerland	5 June 1921	Hungary	
Helmut Schneider	FW	1	0	1 September 1940	Finland	1 September 1940	Finland	
Johannes Schneider	GK	2	0	26 October 1913	Denmark	23 November 1913	Belgium	
René Schneider	DF	1	0	15 December 1995	South Africa	15 December 1995	South Africa	
Fritz Schnürle	FW	1	0	5 June 1921	Hungary	5 June 1921	Hungary	
Heiko Scholz	MF	1	0	14 October 1992	Mexico	14 October 1992	Mexico	
Theo Schönhöft	FW	1	1	13 June 1956	Norway	13 June 1956	Norway	
Christian Schreier	MF	1	0	12 September 1984	Argentina	12 September 1984	Argentina	
Erich Schröder	DF	1	0	26 April 1931	Netherlands	26 April 1931	Netherlands	
Hans Schröder	FW	1	0	18 April 1926	Netherlands	18 April 1926	Netherlands	
Helmut Schubert	MF	3	0	5 October 1941	Finland	7 December 1941	Slovakia	
Carl Schulz	MF	2	0	21 June 1925	Sweden	26 June 1925	Finland	
Christian Schulz	DF	4	0	16 December 2004	Japan	11 August 2010	Denmark	
Fritz Schulz	FW	1	0	4 April 1909	Hungary	4 April 1909	Hungary	
Karl Schulz	MF	1	0	20 October 1929	Finland	20 October 1929	Finland	
Werner Schulz	MF	4	0	28 April 1935	Belgium	20 March 1938	Luxembourg	
Georg Schumann	FW	1	0	31 August 1924	Sweden	31 August 1924	Sweden	
Dirk Schuster	DF	3	0	12 October 1994	Hungary	22 February 1995	Spain	
Manfred Schwabl	MF	4	0	23 September 1987	Denmark	27 April 1988	Switzerland	
Hans Schwartz	DF	2	0	27 May 1934	Belgium	7 October 1934	Denmark	
Willy Schwedler	GK	1	0	18 September 1921	Finland	18 September 1921	Finland	
Hermann Schweickert	FW	1	0	4 April 1909	Switzerland	4 April 1909	Switzerland	
Zoltán Sebescen	MF	1	0	23 February 2000	Netherlands	23 February 2000	Netherlands	
Rudolf Seliger	FW	2	0	22 December 1974	Malta	6 October 1976	Wales	
Suat Serdar *	MF	4	0	9 October 2019	Argentina	3 September 2020	Spain	
Karl Sesta	DF	3	0	15 June 1941	Croatia	1 February 1942	Switzerland	
Hans Siemensmeyer	MF	3	2	27 September 1967	France	22 November 1967	Romania	
Helmut Sievert	DF	1	0	27 September 1936	Luxembourg	27 September 1936	Luxembourg	
Lukas Sinkiewicz	MF	3	0	3 September 2005	Slovakia	8 October 2005	Turkey	
Stefan Skoumal	MF	3	0	9 June 1938	Switzerland	14 April 1940	Yugoslavia	
Wolfgang Solz	FW	2	0	24 October 1962	France	29 April 1964	Czechoslovakia	
Heinrich Sonnrein	GK	2	0	15 September 1935	Estonia	15 March 1936	Hungary	
Oliver Sorg	DF	1	0	13 May 2014	Poland	13 May 2014	Poland	
Walter Sorkale	MF	1	0	29 October 1911	Sweden	29 October 1911	Sweden	
Niklas Stark *	DF	2	0	19 November 2019	Northern Ireland	7 October 2020	Turkey	
Bernhard Steffen	FW	2	0	2 April 1958	Czechoslovakia	11 May 1960	Republic of Ireland	
Arno Steffenhagen	FW	1	0	8 September 1971	Mexico	8 September 1971	Mexico	
Erwin Stein	FW	1	1	20 May 1959	Poland	20 May 1959	Poland	
Paul Steiner	DF	1	0	30 May 1990	Denmark	30 May 1990	Denmark	
Rudolf Steiner	DF	1	0	12 May 1964	Scotland	12 May 1964	Scotland	
Heinz Steinmann	DF	3	1	24 October 1962	France	12 May 1965	England	
Günter Stephan	MF	1	0	18 August 1935	Luxembourg	18 August 1935	Luxembourg	
Kurt Stössel	FW	1	0	26 April 1931	Netherlands	26 April 1931	Netherlands	
Wilhelm Straßburger	MF	2	0	7 September 1930	Denmark	2 November 1930	Norway	
Heinz Strehl	FW	4	4	30 September 1962	Yugoslavia	24 April 1965	Cyprus	
Karl Striebinger	FW	3	2	21 March 1937	Luxembourg	6 February 1938	Switzerland	
Wolfgang Strobel	FW	4	0	23 April 1922	Austria	21 September 1924	Hungary	
Josef Stroh	MF	4	1	9 June 1938	Switzerland	26 February 1939	Yugoslavia	
Erwin Stührk	DF	3	0	27 January 1935	Switzerland	13 October 1935	Latvia	
Hans Sturm	FW	3	0	2 April 1958	Czechoslovakia	31 May 1962	Italy	
Wilhelm Sturm	MF	1	0	7 June 1964	Finland	7 June 1964	Finland	
Klaus Stürmer	FW	2	1	16 October 1954	France	10 May 1961	Northern Ireland	
Albert Sukop	MF	1	0	15 September 1935	Estonia	15 September 1935	Estonia	
Jürgen Sundermann	DF	1	0	23 March 1960	Chile	23 March 1960	Chile	
Willy Tänzer	DF	1	0	7 June 1908	Austria	7 June 1908	Austria	
Franz-Josef Tenhagen	MF	3	0	30 April 1977	Yugoslavia	14 December 1977	Wales	
Otto Thiel	FW	2	0	17 December 1911	Hungary	1 July 1912	Russia	
Karl-Heinz Thielen	FW	2	0	29 April 1964	Czechoslovakia	12 May 1965	England	
Hans Tibulski	FW	1	0	27 September 1931	Denmark	27 September 1931	Denmark	
Otto Tibulski	MF	2	0	27 September 1936	Luxembourg	26 February 1939	Yugoslavia	
Jens Todt	MF	3	0	12 October 1994	Hungary	23 June 1995	Switzerland	
Klaus Toppmöller	FW	3	1	22 May 1976	Spain	1 April 1979	Turkey	
Wilhelm Trautmann	MF	1	0	3 April 1910	Switzerland	3 April 1910	Switzerland	
Horst Trimhold	MF	1	0	30 September 1962	Yugoslavia	30 September 1962	Yugoslavia	
Karl Uhle	FW	1	0	1 July 1912	Russia	1 July 1912	Russia	
Josef Umbach	FW	1	0	16 October 1910	Netherlands	16 October 1910	Netherlands	
Gustav Unfried	MF	1	0	24 April 1910	Netherlands	24 April 1910	Netherlands	
Johann Urbanek	MF	1	0	15 June 1941	Croatia	15 June 1941	Croatia	
Jonas Urbig *	GK	2	0	1 October 2026	Serbia	4 October 2026	Greece	
Mark Uth	FW	1	0	13 October 2018	Netherlands	13 October 2018	Netherlands	
Josha Vagnoman *	DF	3	0	28 March 2023	Belgium	27 September 2026	Greece	
Otto Völker	MF	1	0	21 March 1913	England Amateurs	21 March 1913	England Amateurs	
Willi Völker	DF	1	0	20 October 1929	Finland	20 October 1929	Finland	
Willy Völker	DF	1	0	5 April 1914	Netherlands	5 April 1914	Netherlands	
Kurt Voß	FW	2	2	29 March 1925	Netherlands	26 June 1925	Finland	
Franz Wagner	MF	3	0	25 September 1938	Romania	1 February 1942	Switzerland	
Heinz Warnken	MF	1	0	20 October 1935	Bulgaria	20 October 1935	Bulgaria	
Albert Weber	GK	3	0	5 May 1912	Switzerland	6 October 1912	Denmark	
Josef Weber	MF	1	0	20 November 1927	Netherlands	20 November 1927	Netherlands	
Hans Weilbächer	DF	1	0	28 May 1955	Republic of Ireland	28 May 1955	Republic of Ireland	
Tobias Weis	MF	1	0	2 June 2009	United Arab Emirates	2 June 2009	United Arab Emirates	
Leonhard Weiß	FW	1	0	13 September 1931	Austria	13 September 1931	Austria	
Viktor Weißenbacher	FW	1	1	23 April 1922	Austria	23 April 1922	Austria	
Hans Welker	FW	1	0	15 March 1931	France	15 March 1931	France	
Georg Wellhöfer	DF	1	0	26 March 1922	Switzerland	26 March 1922	Switzerland	
Kurt Welsch	DF	1	0	25 June 1937	Latvia	25 June 1937	Latvia	
Ferdinand Wenauer	DF	4	0	11 May 1960	Republic of Ireland	11 April 1962	Uruguay	
Hans Wentorf	GK	2	0	15 April 1928	Switzerland	16 September 1928	Denmark	
Ludwig Wenz	GK	1	0	7 September 1930	Denmark	7 September 1930	Denmark	
August Werner	DF	2	0	21 June 1925	Sweden	26 June 1925	Finland	
Heinz Werner	MF	1	0	25 August 1935	Romania	25 August 1935	Romania	
Jürgen Werner	MF	4	2	26 March 1961	Chile	5 May 1963	Brazil	
Fritz Wetzel	MF	1	0	23 April 1922	Austria	23 April 1922	Austria	
Hans Weymar	MF	4	0	5 April 1908	Switzerland	16 October 1910	Netherlands	
Werner Widmayer	FW	2	0	17 June 1931	Sweden	21 June 1931	Norway	
Clemens Wientjes	MF	2	0	20 April 1952	Luxembourg	5 October 1952	France	
Hermann Wiggers	DF	1	0	18 June 1911	Sweden	18 June 1911	Sweden	
Willi Wigold	FW	4	3	4 December 1932	Netherlands	11 March 1934	Luxembourg	
Paul Winkler	FW	1	0	20 March 1938	Luxembourg	20 March 1938	Luxembourg	
Willi Winkler	FW	1	0	23 September 1928	Norway	23 September 1928	Norway	
Roland Wohlfarth	FW	2	0	15 October 1986	Spain	6 September 1989	Republic of Ireland	
Philipp Wollscheid	DF	2	0	29 May 2013	Ecuador	2 June 2013	United States	
Eduard Wolpers	FW	1	0	12 December 1926	Switzerland	12 December 1926	Switzerland	
Karl Wolter	FW	3	0	6 October 1912	Denmark	18 September 1921	Finland	
Thomas Wolter	MF	1	0	16 December 1992	Brazil	16 December 1992	Brazil	
Klaus Wunder	FW	1	0	5 September 1973	Soviet Union	5 September 1973	Soviet Union	
Wolfram Wuttke	MF	4	1	15 October 1986	Spain	17 June 1988	Spain	
Klaus Zaczyk	MF	1	1	22 February 1967	Morocco	22 February 1967	Morocco	
Walter Zastrau	DF	1	0	28 December 1958	United Arab Republic	28 December 1958	United Arab Republic	
Johann Zeitler	FW	1	1	20 April 1952	Luxembourg	20 April 1952	Luxembourg	
Dieter Zembski	DF	1	0	8 September 1971	Mexico	8 September 1971	Mexico	
Gerd Zewe	DF	4	0	11 October 1978	Czechoslovakia	25 February 1979	Malta	
Karl Zilgas	FW	1	0	26 October 1913	Denmark	26 October 1913	Denmark	
Karl Zolper	GK	1	0	29 March 1925	Netherlands	29 March 1925	Netherlands	
Carl Zörner	GK	4	0	10 May 1923	Netherlands	12 August 1923	Finland	
Felix Zwolanowski	FW	2	0	15 September 1940	Slovakia	3 November 1940	Yugoslavia	

== See also ==
- List of Germany international footballers
- List of Germany international footballers (5–19 caps)
- List of Germany international footballers born outside Germany
- List of East Germany international footballers
- List of Saarland international footballers
