= List of Germany international footballers born outside Germany =

This is a list of the players who played for Germany national football team and who were born outside the current borders of Germany. This list includes former West Germany national football team players. It also includes players born in presently non-German territories even if they were controlled by Germany when they were born regardless of the means by which those lands had come under German administration - this list therefore includes players born in the historical eastern territories of Germany, militarily-occupied territories, territories annexed by the Nazis and German overseas colonies. However, it does not include players who played only for the former East Germany or Saarland national football teams, nor does it include any Germany/West Germany international footballers born in East Germany, Saarland or West Berlin prior to those lands' absorption by the modern Federal Republic of Germany.

== List of Germany international footballers born outside Germany ==
=== Austria ===
- Franz Binder
- Karl Decker
- Wilhelm Hahnemann
- Franz Jelinek
- Matthias Kaburek
- Alexander Martinek
- Hans Mock
- Josef Pekarek
- Hans Pesser
- Peter Platzer
- Rudolf Raftl
- Willibald Schmaus
- Karl Sesta
- Josef Stroh
- Johann Urbanek
- Franz Wagner

=== Belgium ===
- Herbert Wimmer

=== Bosnia and Herzegovina ===
==== SFR Yugoslavia ====
- Marko Marin

=== Brazil ===
- Cacau
- Kevin Kuranyi
- Paulo Rink

=== Cameroon ===
- Youssoufa Moukoko

=== Czech Republic ===
==== Czechoslovakia ====
- Mirko Votava

==== Sudetenland ====
- Sigfried Held

=== France ===
- Armel Bella-Kotchap

=== Ghana ===
- Gerald Asamoah

=== Hungary ===
- Ernst Nagelschmitz
- Stefan Reisch

=== Namibia ===
==== German South West Africa ====
- Werner Schulz

=== Poland ===
- Paul Freier
- Richard Herrmann
- Miroslav Klose
- Dariusz Wosz
- Martin Max
- Werner Olk
- Sepp Piontek
- Lukas Podolski
- Reinhard Schaletzki
- Lukas Sinkiewicz
- Hans Sturm
- Piotr Trochowski
- Wolfgang Weber
- Ernst Wilimowski

=== Romania ===
- Josef Posipal

=== Russia ===
==== East Prussia ====
- Klaus-Dieter Sieloff

==== Soviet Union ====
- Andreas Beck

=== Slovakia ===
==== Czechoslovakia ====
- Fritz Balogh

=== Slovenia ===
==== SFR Yugoslavia ====
- Fredi Bobic

=== Switzerland ===
- Oliver Neuville

=== Syria ===
- Mahmoud Dahoud

=== Turkey ===
- Mustafa Doğan

=== Ukraine ===
==== Soviet Union ====
- Roman Neustädter

=== Uzbekistan ===
- Waldemar Anton

== List by country of birth ==
Country	Total
Austria	16
Poland	14
Brazil	3
Czech Republic	2
Hungary	2
Russia	2
Belgium	1
Bosnia and Herzegovina	1
Cameroon	1
France	1
Ghana	1
Namibia	1
Romania	1
Slovakia	1
Slovenia	1
Switzerland	1
Syria	1
Turkey	1
Ukraine	1
Uzbekistan	1
