= List of Germany international footballers (5–19 caps) =

Players of the Germany national football team with 5 to 19 caps

The Germany national football team played its first international match on 5 April 1908 during the era of the German Empire, losing 5–3 to Switzerland in Basel. The team has been one of the most successful national sides in world football. They won the World Cup in 1954, 1974, 1990 and 2014, as well as the European Championship in 1972, 1980 and 1996. In total, 1,002 players have represented the Germany national team. This list covers players with between 5 and 19 caps for the national team organised by the German Football Association, including West Germany. The player are listed in alphabetical order of surname. All statistics are correct up to and including the match played on 16 November 2026 against Netherlands.

== Key ==
Positions key
GK	Goalkeeper
DF	Defender
MF	Midfielder
FW	Forward

Player
This colour background and the * symbol indicate that the player is currently active at the club level.
Position
Playing positions are listed according to the player's primary position while playing for the national team.
Caps and goals
Caps and goals comprise those in the qualifying and final tournaments of the FIFA World Cup and UEFA European Championship, as well as the Summer Olympics (pre-World War II), FIFA Confederations Cup, UEFA Nations League and international friendly matches.

== Players ==
Germany national football team players with between 5 and 19 caps
Player	Pos.	Caps	Goals	Debut		Last or most recent match		Ref.
Player	Pos.	Caps	Goals	Date	Opponent	Date	Opponent	Ref.
Rüdiger Abramczik	FW	19	2	27 April 1977	Northern Ireland	25 February 1979	Malta	
Karim Adeyemi *	FW	13	1	5 September 2021	Armenia	27 September 2026	Greece	
René Adler	GK	12	0	11 October 2008	Russia	29 May 2013	Ecuador	
Ernst Albrecht	MF	17	4	15 April 1928	Switzerland	11 March 1934	Luxembourg	
Karl Allgöwer	FW	10	0	19 November 1980	France	14 May 1986	Netherlands	
Nadiem Amiri *	MF	14	1	9 October 2019	Argentina	24 September 2026	Netherlands	
Robert Andrich *	MF	19	0	21 November 2023	Australia	13 October 2025	Northern Ireland	
Waldemar Anton *	DF	17	0	23 March 2024	France	4 October 2026	Greece	
Dennis Aogo	DF	12	0	13 May 2010	Malta	2 June 2013	United States	
Hans Appel	DF	5	0	3 December 1933	Poland	25 September 1938	Romania	
Willi Arlt	FW	11	2	29 January 1939	Belgium	19 July 1942	Bulgaria	
Ridle Baku *	DF	9	2	11 November 2020	Czech Republic	13 November 2026	Serbia	
Hans Bauer	DF	5	0	23 December 1951	Luxembourg	26 October 1958	France	
Oliver Baumann *	GK	13	0	14 October 2024	Netherlands	6 June 2026	United States	
Andreas Beck	DF	9	0	11 February 2009	Norway	17 November 2010	Sweden	
Albert Beier	DF	11	0	14 December 1924	Switzerland	24 May 1931	Austria	
Maximilian Beier *	FW	10	0	3 June 2024	Ukraine	25 June 2026	Ecuador	
Uwe Bein	MF	17	3	4 October 1989	Finland	22 September 1993	Tunisia	
Stefan Beinlich	MF	5	0	2 September 1998	Malta	16 August 2000	Spain	
Karim Bellarabi	MF	11	1	11 October 2014	Poland	31 August 2016	Finland	
Jakob Bender	MF	9	0	22 October 1933	Belgium	30 June 1935	Sweden	
Lars Bender	MF	19	4	6 September 2011	Poland	18 November 2014	Spain	
Sven Bender	MF	7	0	29 March 2011	Australia	19 November 2013	England	
Helmut Benthaus	MF	8	0	21 December 1958	Bulgaria	23 November 1960	Bulgaria	
Josef Bergmaier	FW	8	1	4 May 1930	Switzerland	1 January 1933	Italy	
Günter Bernard	GK	5	0	24 October 1962	France	8 May 1968	Wales	
Ulrich Biesinger	MF	7	2	26 September 1954	Belgium	28 December 1958	United Arab Republic	
Willi Billmann	DF	11	0	2 May 1937	Switzerland	5 October 1941	Sweden	
Franz Binder	FW	9	10	29 January 1939	Belgium	1 June 1941	Romania	
Manfred Binz	DF	14	1	29 August 1990	Portugal	18 June 1992	Netherlands	
Tom Bischof *	MF	5	1	8 June 2025	France	16 November 2026	Netherlands	
Jörg Böhme	MF	10	1	29 May 2001	Slovakia	29 March 2003	Lithuania	
Rudi Bommer	MF	6	0	15 February 1984	Bulgaria	12 September 1984	Argentina	
Ronny Borchers	MF	6	0	20 December 1978	Netherlands	23 September 1981	Finland	
Uli Borowka	DF	6	0	2 April 1988	Argentina	21 June 1988	Netherlands	
Hermann Bosch	MF	5	0	29 June 1912	Austria	18 May 1913	Switzerland	
Thomas Brdarić	FW	8	1	27 March 2002	United States	21 December 2004	Thailand	
Max Breunig	DF	9	1	24 April 1910	Netherlands	23 November 1913	Belgium	
Nathaniel Brown *	DF	11	1	10 October 2025	Luxembourg	16 November 2026	Netherlands	
Hans Brunke	DF	7	0	2 October 1927	Denmark	13 September 1931	Austria	
Rudolf Brunnenmeier	FW	5	3	4 November 1964	Sweden	14 November 1965	Cyprus	
Fritz Buchloh	GK	17	0	4 December 1932	Netherlands	13 September 1936	Poland	
Dieter Burdenski	GK	12	0	8 June 1977	Uruguay	22 May 1984	Italy	
Herbert Burdenski	MF	5	2	5 October 1941	Finland	15 April 1951	Switzerland	
Karl Burger	MF	11	1	4 April 1909	Switzerland	1 July 1912	Russia	
Jonathan Burkardt *	FW	8	0	11 October 2024	Bosnia and Herzegovina	4 October 2026	Greece	
Willy Busch	DF	13	0	22 October 1933	Belgium	27 September 1936	Luxembourg	
Gonzalo Castro	MF	5	0	28 March 2007	Denmark	21 November 2007	Wales	
Hans Cieslarczyk	FW	7	3	22 December 1957	Hungary	26 October 1958	France	
Dietmar Danner	MF	6	0	5 September 1973	Soviet Union	17 June 1976	Yugoslavia	
Karl Decker	MF	8	7	18 January 1942	Croatia	22 November 1942	Slovakia	
Thomas Doll	MF	18	1	27 March 1991	Soviet Union	24 March 1993	Scotland	
Bernd Dörfel	MF	15	2	19 November 1966	Norway	24 September 1969	Bulgaria	
Charly Dörfel	FW	11	7	3 August 1960	Iceland	4 November 1964	Sweden	
Hans Dorfner	MF	7	1	12 August 1987	France	15 November 1989	Wales	
Ludwig Durek	FW	6	2	15 September 1940	Slovakia	3 May 1942	Hungary	
Erik Durm	DF	7	0	1 June 2014	Cameroon	18 November 2014	Spain	
Dieter Eckstein	FW	7	0	15 October 1986	Spain	31 August 1988	Finland	
Norbert Eder	DF	9	0	11 May 1986	Yugoslavia	29 June 1986	Argentina	
Franz Elbern	FW	8	2	18 August 1935	Luxembourg	25 June 1937	Latvia	
Lothar Emmerich	FW	5	2	23 March 1966	Netherlands	30 July 1966	England	
Stephan Engels	MF	8	0	21 March 1982	Brazil	27 April 1983	Austria	
Robert Enke	GK	8	0	28 March 2007	Denmark	12 August 2009	Azerbaijan	
Georg Ertl	GK	7	0	21 June 1925	Sweden	2 October 1927	Denmark	
Holger Fach	MF	5	0	31 August 1988	Finland	6 September 1989	Republic of Ireland	
Wolfgang Fahrian	GK	10	0	11 April 1962	Uruguay	29 April 1964	Czechoslovakia	
Josef Fath	FW	13	7	9 September 1934	Poland	24 April 1938	Portugal	
Hans Fiederer	MF	6	3	26 March 1939	Luxembourg	16 November 1941	Denmark	
Walter Fischer	FW	5	0	26 March 1911	Switzerland	5 April 1914	Netherlands	
Fritz Förderer	FW	11	10	5 April 1908	Switzerland	26 October 1913	Denmark	
Bernd Franke	GK	7	0	28 March 1973	Czechoslovakia	12 May 1982	Norway	
Andreas Franz	FW	10	4	26 March 1922	Switzerland	20 June 1926	Sweden	
Paul Freier	MF	19	1	9 May 2002	Kuwait	28 March 2007	Denmark	
Manuel Friedrich	DF	9	1	16 August 2006	Sweden	6 February 2008	Austria	
Michael Frontzeck	DF	19	0	12 September 1984	Argentina	9 September 1992	Denmark	
Gottfried Fuchs	FW	6	13	26 March 1911	Switzerland	23 November 1913	Belgium	
Chris Führich *	FW	10	0	14 October 2023	United States	24 September 2026	Netherlands	
Josef Gauchel	FW	16	13	4 August 1936	Luxembourg	19 July 1942	Bulgaria	
Maurizio Gaudino	MF	5	1	22 September 1993	Tunisia	8 June 1994	Canada	
Hans Geiger	MF	6	0	31 October 1926	Netherlands	23 June 1929	Sweden	
Rolf Geiger	FW	8	2	23 December 1956	Belgium	7 June 1964	Finland	
Christian Gentner	MF	5	0	29 May 2009	China	11 August 2010	Denmark	
Klaus Gerwien	FW	6	1	29 December 1963	Morocco	22 December 1968	Mexico	
Willi Giesemann	MF	14	0	11 May 1960	Republic of Ireland	6 June 1965	Brazil	
Josef Glaser	MF	5	0	13 March 1909	England Amateurs	1 July 1912	Russia	
Pascal Groß *	MF	19	1	9 September 2023	Japan	25 June 2026	Ecuador	
Kevin Großkreutz	MF	6	0	13 May 2010	Malta	3 September 2014	Argentina	
Christian Günter *	DF	8	0	13 May 2014	Poland	28 March 2023	Belgium	
Hans Hagen	MF	12	0	26 September 1920	Austria	4 May 1930	Switzerland	
Marcel Halstenberg	DF	9	1	10 November 2017	England	19 June 2021	Portugal	
Mike Hanke	FW	12	1	8 June 2005	Russia	17 November 2007	Cyprus	
Wilfried Hannes	DF	8	0	1 April 1981	Albania	22 September 1982	Belgium	
Franz Hanreiter	MF	7	0	14 April 1940	Yugoslavia	1 February 1942	Switzerland	
Otto Harder	FW	15	14	5 April 1914	Netherlands	12 December 1926	Switzerland	
Sigmund Haringer	DF	15	0	15 March 1931	France	25 April 1937	Belgium	
Gerhard Harpers	MF	6	0	22 March 1953	Austria	16 November 1955	Norway	
Conrad Heidkamp	DF	9	1	20 November 1927	Netherlands	28 September 1930	Hungary	
Alfred Heiß	FW	8	2	23 December 1962	Switzerland	7 May 1966	Northern Ireland	
Patrick Helmes	FW	13	2	28 March 2007	Denmark	11 August 2010	Denmark	
Walter Hempel	DF	11	0	5 April 1908	Switzerland	1 July 1912	Russia	
Benjamin Henrichs *	DF	19	0	11 November 2016	San Marino	19 November 2024	Hungary	
Heinrich Hergert	MF	5	0	4 May 1930	Switzerland	19 March 1933	France	
Heiko Herrlich	FW	5	1	29 March 1995	Georgia	11 October 1995	Wales	
Günther Herrmann	MF	9	1	26 October 1960	Northern Ireland	22 March 1967	Bulgaria	
Richard Herrmann	FW	8	1	22 November 1950	Switzerland	20 June 1954	Hungary	
Dieter Herzog	FW	5	0	23 February 1974	Spain	4 September 1974	Switzerland	
Roberto Hilbert	MF	8	0	28 March 2007	Denmark	6 February 2008	Austria	
Timo Hildebrand	GK	7	0	28 April 2004	Romania	17 October 2007	Czech Republic	
Julius Hirsch	MF	7	4	17 December 1911	Hungary	23 November 1913	Belgium	
Georg Hochgesang	MF	6	4	15 June 1924	Norway	23 October 1927	Norway	
Dieter Hoeneß	FW	6	4	22 May 1979	Republic of Ireland	29 June 1986	Argentina	
Ludwig Hofmann	FW	18	4	18 April 1926	Netherlands	15 March 1931	France	
Ernst Hollstein	DF	6	0	24 April 1910	Netherlands	3 July 1912	Hungary	
Josef Hornauer	FW	5	2	15 April 1928	Switzerland	13 September 1931	Austria	
Heinz Hornig	MF	7	0	13 March 1965	Italy	1 June 1966	Romania	
Paul Hunder	MF	8	0	13 March 1909	England Amateurs	17 December 1911	Hungary	
Robert Huth	DF	19	2	18 August 2004	Austria	2 June 2009	United Arab Emirates	
Eike Immel	GK	19	0	11 October 1980	Netherlands	21 June 1988	Netherlands	
Adolf Jäger	FW	18	11	7 June 1908	Austria	14 December 1924	Switzerland	
Helmut Jahn	GK	17	0	3 December 1939	Slovakia	22 November 1942	Slovakia	
Willy Jürissen	GK	6	0	18 August 1935	Luxembourg	27 August 1939	Slovakia	
Hans Kalb	MF	15	2	27 June 1920	Switzerland	3 June 1928	Uruguay	
Jupp Kapellmann	MF	5	0	12 May 1973	Bulgaria	20 November 1974	Greece	
Lennart Karl *	MF	5	0	27 March 2026	Switzerland	16 November 2026	Netherlands	
Erich Kauer	MF	5	0	2 November 1930	Norway	13 September 1931	Austria	
Alfred Kelbassa	MF	6	2	23 December 1956	Belgium	28 June 1958	France	
Stefan Kießling	FW	6	0	28 March 2007	Denmark	10 July 2010	Uruguay	
Eugen Kipp	FW	18	10	5 April 1908	Switzerland	23 November 1913	Belgium	
Wolfgang Kleff	GK	6	0	22 June 1971	Norway	14 November 1973	Scotland	
Tim Kleindienst *	FW	6	4	11 October 2024	Bosnia and Herzegovina	23 March 2025	Italy	
August Klingler	FW	5	6	16 August 1942	Romania	22 November 1942	Slovakia	
Bernhard Klodt	FW	19	3	22 November 1950	Switzerland	20 May 1959	Poland	
Hans Klodt	GK	17	0	20 March 1938	Luxembourg	5 October 1941	Sweden	
Robin Koch *	DF	15	0	9 October 2019	Argentina	7 September 2025	Northern Ireland	
Georg Köhler	MF	5	0	25 October 1925	Switzerland	30 September 1928	Sweden	
Friedhelm Konietzka	FW	9	3	30 September 1962	Yugoslavia	24 April 1965	Cyprus	
Horst Köppel	MF	11	2	6 March 1968	Belgium	5 September 1973	Soviet Union	
Charly Körbel	DF	6	0	22 December 1974	Malta	11 October 1975	Greece	
Christoph Kramer	MF	12	0	13 May 2014	Poland	29 March 2016	Italy	
Werner Krämer	MF	13	3	28 September 1963	Turkey	22 March 1967	Bulgaria	
Engelbert Kraus	FW	9	3	25 September 1955	Yugoslavia	7 June 1964	Finland	
Walter Krause	MF	6	0	24 October 1920	Hungary	15 June 1924	Norway	
Erwin Kremers	FW	15	3	26 May 1972	Soviet Union	1 May 1974	Sweden	
Helmut Kremers	MF	8	0	10 October 1973	Austria	12 March 1975	England	
Richard Kress	FW	9	2	19 December 1954	Portugal	22 October 1961	Greece	
Willibald Kreß	GK	16	0	10 February 1929	Switzerland	3 June 1934	Czechoslovakia	
Max Kruse	FW	14	4	29 May 2013	Ecuador	11 October 2015	Georgia	
Anton Kugler	DF	7	0	1 January 1923	Italy	20 November 1927	Netherlands	
Hans Küppers	MF	7	2	23 December 1962	Switzerland	17 December 1967	Albania	
Jürgen Kurbjuhn	DF	5	0	11 April 1962	Uruguay	4 May 1966	Republic of Ireland	
Emil Kutterer	DF	8	0	21 June 1925	Sweden	15 April 1928	Switzerland	
Ernst Kuzorra	FW	12	7	20 November 1927	Netherlands	20 March 1938	Hungary	
Ludwig Lachner	MF	8	4	28 September 1930	Hungary	14 January 1934	Hungary	
Hans Lang	MF	10	0	26 March 1922	Switzerland	18 April 1926	Netherlands	
Benjamin Lauth	FW	5	0	12 February 2003	Spain	18 February 2004	Croatia	
Bernd Leno *	GK	9	0	29 May 2016	Slovakia	2 September 2021	Liechtenstein	
August Lenz	FW	14	9	28 April 1935	Belgium	20 March 1938	Luxembourg	
Jamie Leweling *	FW	6	1	14 October 2024	Netherlands	20 June 2026	Ivory Coast	
Werner Liebrich	DF	16	0	17 June 1951	Turkey	21 November 1956	Switzerland	
Max Lorenz	MF	19	1	24 April 1965	Cyprus	20 June 1970	Uruguay	
Friedel Lutz	DF	12	0	3 August 1960	Iceland	25 July 1966	Soviet Union	
Edmund Malecki	MF	5	2	25 August 1935	Romania	26 March 1939	Luxembourg	
Ludwig Männer	MF	5	0	25 June 1937	Latvia	15 September 1940	Slovakia	
Hugo Mantel	MF	5	0	2 October 1927	Denmark	19 March 1933	France	
Marko Marin	MF	16	1	27 May 2008	Belarus	17 November 2010	Sweden	
Olaf Marschall	FW	13	3	12 October 1994	Hungary	28 July 1999	New Zealand	
Otto Martwig	MF	6	0	21 June 1925	Sweden	23 October 1927	Norway	
Paul Mebus	MF	6	0	15 April 1951	Switzerland	20 June 1954	Hungary	
Norbert Meier	MF	16	2	13 October 1982	England	16 October 1985	Portugal	
Frank Mill	FW	17	0	21 March 1982	Brazil	30 May 1990	Denmark	
Karl Miller	DF	12	0	6 April 1941	Hungary	22 November 1942	Slovakia	
Maximilian Mittelstädt *	DF	18	1	23 March 2024	France	16 November 2026	Netherlands	
Hans Mock	MF	5	0	4 June 1938	Switzerland	1 February 1942	Switzerland	
Arthur Mohns	DF	5	0	26 September 1920	Austria	2 July 1922	Hungary	
Ernst Möller	FW	9	4	14 April 1911	England Amateurs	23 November 1913	Belgium	
Alfons Moog	DF	7	0	29 June 1939	Estonia	17 November 1940	Denmark	
Dieter Müller	FW	12	9	17 June 1976	Yugoslavia	21 June 1978	Austria	
Henry Müller	DF	9	0	5 June 1921	Hungary	23 September 1928	Norway	
Josef Müller	DF	12	0	18 September 1921	Finland	15 April 1928	Switzerland	
Ludwig Müller	DF	6	0	1 June 1968	England	24 September 1969	Bulgaria	
Andreas Munkert	DF	8	0	28 April 1935	Belgium	15 November 1936	Italy	
Florian Neuhaus *	MF	10	2	7 October 2020	Turkey	29 March 2022	Netherlands	
Christian Nerlinger	MF	6	1	5 September 1998	Romania	9 October 1999	Turkey	
Norbert Nigbur	GK	6	0	23 February 1974	Spain	2 April 1980	Austria	
Felix Nmecha *	MF	15	3	28 March 2023	Belgium	13 November 2026	Serbia	
Lukas Nmecha *	FW	7	0	11 November 2021	Liechtenstein	23 September 2022	Hungary	
Hans Nowak	DF	15	0	20 September 1961	Denmark	4 November 1964	Sweden	
Emil Oberle	FW	5	1	4 April 1909	Switzerland	3 July 1912	Hungary	
David Odonkor	FW	16	1	30 May 2006	Japan	12 June 2008	Croatia	
Jonny Otten	DF	6	0	23 February 1983	Portugal	28 March 1984	Soviet Union	
Patrick Owomoyela	DF	11	0	16 December 2004	Japan	22 March 2006	United States	
Aleksandar Pavlovic *	MF	19	1	3 June 2024	Ukraine	16 November 2026	Netherlands	
Hans Pesser	FW	12	2	14 May 1938	England	17 November 1940	Denmark	
Alfred Pfaff	MF	7	2	19 August 1953	Norway	21 November 1956	Switzerland	
Hans Pflügler	DF	11	0	25 March 1987	Israel	19 June 1990	Colombia	
Sepp Piontek	DF	6	0	13 March 1965	Italy	7 May 1966	Northern Ireland	
Marvin Plattenhardt	DF	7	0	6 June 2017	Denmark	17 June 2018	Mexico	
Paul Pömpner	FW	6	3	31 August 1924	Sweden	26 June 1925	Finland	
Luitpold Popp	DF	5	1	24 October 1920	Hungary	20 June 1926	Sweden	
Josef Pöttinger	FW	14	9	18 April 1926	Netherlands	10 May 1930	England	
Michael Preetz	FW	7	3	6 February 1999	United States	26 April 2000	Switzerland	
Rudolf Raftl	GK	6	0	4 June 1938	Switzerland	14 April 1940	Yugoslavia	
Christian Rahn	DF	5	0	9 May 2002	Kuwait	31 March 2004	Belgium	
Uwe Rahn	FW	14	5	17 October 1984	Sweden	23 September 1987	Denmark	
Josef Rasselnberg	FW	9	8	22 October 1933	Belgium	4 December 1935	England	
Tobias Rau	DF	7	1	12 February 2003	Spain	10 September 2003	Scotland	
Knut Reinhardt	MF	7	0	21 September 1988	Soviet Union	16 December 1992	Brazil	
Stefan Reisch	MF	9	0	30 September 1962	Yugoslavia	12 May 1964	Scotland	
Erich Retter	DF	14	0	20 April 1952	Luxembourg	26 May 1956	England	
Lars Ricken	MF	16	1	10 September 1997	Armenia	17 April 2002	Argentina	
Carl Riegel	MF	7	0	27 June 1920	Switzerland	29 June 1923	Sweden	
Paulo Rink	FW	13	0	2 September 1998	Malta	2 September 2000	Greece	
Walter Risse	DF	8	0	10 May 1923	Netherlands	23 September 1928	Norway	
Josef Röhrig	MF	12	2	22 November 1950	Switzerland	14 March 1956	Netherlands	
Otto Rohwedder	FW	5	2	7 October 1934	Denmark	25 April 1937	Belgium	
Helmut Röpnack	DF	10	0	13 March 1909	England Amateurs	23 November 1913	Belgium	
Sidney Sam	FW	5	0	29 May 2013	Ecuador	19 November 2013	England	
Günter Sawitzki	GK	10	0	13 June 1956	Norway	3 November 1963	Sweden	
Kevin Schade *	FW	7	0	25 March 2023	Peru	27 September 2026	Greece	
Marcel Schäfer	DF	8	0	19 November 2008	England	11 August 2010	Denmark	
Erich Schanko	MF	14	0	17 June 1951	Turkey	28 March 1954	Saar	
Willibald Schmaus	DF	10	0	4 June 1938	Switzerland	1 February 1942	Switzerland	
Marcel Schmelzer	DF	16	0	17 November 2010	Sweden	5 March 2014	Chile	
Hans Schmidt	MF	16	0	18 May 1913	Switzerland	12 December 1926	Switzerland	
Karl Schmidt	DF	9	0	25 September 1955	Yugoslavia	20 November 1957	Sweden	
Helmut Schön	FW	16	17	21 November 1937	Sweden	5 October 1941	Sweden	
Willi Schröder	MF	12	3	23 December 1951	Luxembourg	20 November 1957	Sweden	
Michael Schulz	DF	7	0	25 March 1992	Italy	22 December 1993	Mexico	
Nico Schulz *	DF	12	2	9 September 2018	Peru	11 November 2020	Czech Republic	
Josef Schümmelfelder	MF	5	0	26 October 1913	Denmark	5 June 1921	Hungary	
Franz Schütz	DF	11	0	10 February 1929	Switzerland	4 December 1932	Netherlands	
Jürgen Schütz	FW	6	2	23 March 1960	Chile	5 May 1963	Brazil	
Wolfgang Seel	MF	6	0	4 September 1974	Switzerland	14 December 1977	Wales	
Leonhard Seiderer	FW	8	5	27 June 1920	Switzerland	21 April 1924	Netherlands	
Gerhard Siedl	FW	6	3	3 April 1957	Netherlands	20 December 1959	Yugoslavia	
Klaus-Dieter Sieloff	DF	14	5	7 June 1964	Finland	22 June 1971	Norway	
Wilhelm Simetsreiter	FW	8	8	25 August 1935	Romania	29 August 1937	Estonia	
Albert Sing	MF	9	1	20 October 1940	Bulgaria	22 November 1942	Slovakia	
Hanne Sobek	MF	10	2	3 June 1923	Switzerland	21 June 1931	Norway	
Wilhelm Sold	MF	12	0	18 August 1935	Luxembourg	20 September 1942	Sweden	
Anton Stach *	MF	5	0	26 March 2022	Israel	27 September 2026	Greece	
Uli Stein	GK	6	0	7 June 1983	Yugoslavia	14 May 1986	Netherlands	
Angelo Stiller *	MF	9	0	7 September 2024	Hungary	25 June 2026	Ecuador	
Lars Stindl	FW	11	4	6 June 2017	Denmark	27 March 2018	Brazil	
Gerd Strack	DF	10	1	13 October 1982	England	20 November 1983	Albania	
Jakob Streitle	DF	15	0	9 June 1938	Switzerland	4 May 1952	Republic of Ireland	
Hans Stubb	DF	10	1	4 May 1930	Switzerland	14 January 1934	Hungary	
Hans Sutor	FW	12	2	26 September 1920	Austria	25 October 1925	Switzerland	
Michael Tarnat	DF	19	0	9 October 1996	Armenia	14 October 1998	Moldova	
Serdar Tasci	DF	14	0	20 August 2008	Belgium	11 August 2010	Denmark	
Bernhard Termath	FW	7	4	21 November 1951	Turkey	16 October 1954	France	
Karl Tewes	MF	6	0	26 September 1920	Austria	2 July 1922	Hungary	
Malick Thiaw *	DF	10	0	16 June 2023	Poland	13 November 2026	Serbia	
Andreas Thom	FW	10	2	19 December 1990	Switzerland	27 April 1994	United Arab Emirates	
Willi Tiefel	DF	7	0	8 May 1935	Irish Free State	27 February 1936	Portugal	
Heinrich Träg	FW	6	1	5 May 1921	Austria	31 October 1926	Netherlands	
Kevin Trapp *	GK	9	0	6 June 2017	Denmark	21 November 2023	Australia	
Christian Träsch	DF	10	0	2 June 2009	United Arab Emirates	11 November 2011	Ukraine	
Philipp Treu *	DF	5	0	24 September 2026	Netherlands	16 November 2026	Netherlands	
Camillo Ugi	MF	15	1	13 March 1909	England Amateurs	17 November 1912	Netherlands	
Lothar Ulsaß	FW	10	8	24 April 1965	Cyprus	26 March 1969	Wales	
Deniz Undav *	FW	13	9	23 March 2024	France	29 June 2026	Paraguay	
Georg Volkert	FW	12	2	6 March 1968	Belgium	8 October 1977	Italy	
Kevin Volland *	FW	15	1	13 May 2014	Poland	14 November 2021	Armenia	
Heinz Vollmar	FW	12	3	30 June 1956	Sweden	8 March 1961	Belgium	
Miroslav Votava	MF	5	0	21 November 1979	Soviet Union	7 January 1981	Brazil	
Herbert Waas	FW	11	1	7 June 1983	Yugoslavia	21 September 1988	Soviet Union	
Martin Wagner	MF	6	0	16 December 1992	Brazil	12 October 1994	Hungary	
Sandro Wagner	FW	8	5	6 June 2017	Denmark	27 March 2018	Brazil	
Erwin Waldner	FW	13	2	19 December 1954	Portugal	21 December 1958	Bulgaria	
Luca Waldschmidt *	FW	7	2	9 October 2019	Argentina	17 November 2020	Spain	
Heinrich Weber	DF	12	0	28 May 1928	Switzerland	24 May 1931	Austria	
Ralf Weber	MF	9	0	7 September 1994	Russia	23 June 1995	Switzerland	
Karl Wegele	FW	15	2	3 April 1910	Switzerland	5 April 1914	Netherlands	
Roman Weidenfeller	GK	5	0	19 November 2013	England	13 June 2015	Gibraltar	
Julian Weigl *	MF	6	0	29 May 2016	Slovakia	26 March 2022	Israel	
Josef Wendl	MF	5	0	2 November 1930	Norway	19 November 1933	Switzerland	
Adolf Werner	GK	13	0	13 March 1909	England Amateurs	3 July 1912	Hungary	
Heinz Wewers	DF	12	1	23 December 1951	Luxembourg	28 June 1958	France	
Ludwig Wieder	FW	6	2	3 June 1923	Switzerland	31 October 1926	Netherlands	
Tim Wiese	GK	6	0	19 November 2008	England	29 February 2012	France	
Leo Wilden	DF	15	0	23 March 1960	Chile	29 April 1964	Czechoslovakia	
Ernst Wilimowski	FW	8	13	1 June 1941	Romania	22 November 1942	Slovakia	
Marius Wolf *	DF	5	0	25 March 2023	Peru	20 June 2023	Colombia	
Nick Woltemade *	FW	14	4	4 June 2025	Portugal	4 October 2026	Greece	
Horst Wolter	GK	13	0	22 February 1967	Morocco	20 June 1970	Uruguay	
Ronnie Worm	FW	7	5	20 December 1975	Turkey	11 October 1978	Czechoslovakia	
Willi Worpitzky	FW	9	5	4 April 1909	Hungary	6 October 1912	Denmark	
Dariusz Wosz	MF	17	1	26 February 1997	Israel	15 November 2000	Denmark	
Georg Wunderlich	FW	5	0	27 June 1920	Switzerland	10 May 1923	Netherlands	
Amin Younes *	FW	8	2	6 June 2017	Denmark	31 March 2021	North Macedonia	
Alexander Zickler	FW	12	2	18 November 1998	Netherlands	11 October 2002	Bosnia and Herzegovina	
Ron-Robert Zieler *	GK	6	0	11 November 2011	Ukraine	10 June 2015	United States	
Paul Zielinski	MF	15	0	27 May 1934	Belgium	27 September 1936	Luxembourg	
Herbert Zimmermann	MF	14	2	6 October 1976	Wales	22 December 1979	Turkey	
Michael Zorc	MF	7	0	16 December 1992	Brazil	13 October 1993	Uruguay	

== See also ==
- List of Germany international footballers
- List of Germany international footballers (1–4 caps)
- List of Germany international footballers born outside Germany
- List of East Germany international footballers
- List of Saarland international footballers
