= 1888 in association football =

The following are the association football events of the year 1888 throughout the world.

== Events ==
- February 1 – Royal Arsenal move to Manor Ground, their first permanent stadium, playing their first match there, against Millwall Rovers.
- March 23 – A meeting of 12 clubs at Anderson's Hotel in London on the eve of the FA Cup Final, convened by Aston Villa's William McGregor, discusses the possibility of a national football league competition.
- April 17 – A further meeting at Manchester's Royal Hotel leads to the competition being named The Football League.
- September 8 – The first Football League matches are played, marking the 1st season in the Football League.

=== Clubs founded in 1888 ===
- Barnet
- Celtic
- Dartford
- Southport
- Sparta Rotterdam
- Walsall

== Winners club national cup ==
=== Asia ===
Nation	Tournament	Winner	Score	Runner-up	Venue	Title
India	1888 Durand Cup	Royal Scots Fusiliers	2-1	Highland Light Infantry	Annadale	1st

=== Europe ===
Nation	Tournament	Winner	Score	Runner-up	Venue	Title	Previous Title won
England	1887–88 FA Cup	West Bromwich Albion	2-1	Preston North End	Kennington Oval	1st	None
Ireland	1887–88 Irish Cup	Cliftonville	2-1	Distillery	Ulster Cricket Ground	2nd	1883
Scotland	1887–88 Scottish Cup	Renton	6-1	Cambuslang	Cathkin Park	2nd	1885
Wales	1887–88 Welsh Cup	Chirk AAA	5-0	Newtown	Owens Field	2nd	1887

== Winners club national leagues ==
- No national leagues existed prior to 1888, when the English Football League was founded. The first champions, Preston North End, emerged in the spring of 1889.

== International tournaments ==
- 1888 British Home Championship (February 4 – April 7, 1888)

Team	Pld	W	D	L	GF	GA	GD	Pts
England (C)	3	3	0	0	15	2	+13	6
Scotland	3	2	0	1	15	8	+7	4
Wales	3	1	0	2	13	10	+3	2
Ireland	3	0	0	3	3	26	−23	0

Rules for classification: 1) Points. The points system worked as follows: 2 points for a win and 1 point for a draw.
(C) Champions
- 1888 Football World Championship (May 19, 1888)
19 May 1888

Renton (Scotland)	4–1	(England) West Bromwich Albion

Cathkin Park, Glasgow
Attendance: 6,000

== Births ==
- 11 March – Hermann Garrn (d. 1966), German international footballer.
- 23 July – Jimmy Gordon (d. 1954), Scotland international half-back in ten matches (1912–1920).
- 24 August – Leo Bosschart (d. 1951), Dutch international footballer.
- 6 December – Wilhelm Trautmann (d. 1969), German international footballer.
