= Andreas Breynck =

German athlete (1890–1957)

Personal information
- Date of birth: 4 July 1890
- Place of birth: Duisburg, German Empire
- Date of death: 12 July 1957 (aged 67)
- Place of death: Schwelm, West Germany
- Position: Forward

Senior career*
Years	Team	Apps	(Gls)
- Preußen Duisburg

International career
1910	Germany	1	(0)
- * Club domestic league appearances and goals

Andreas Breynck (4 July 1890 – 12 July 1957) was a German athlete. He competed in the 1908 Summer Olympics in London. Breynck placed second in his initial semifinal heat of the 1500 metres with a time of 4:30.0, not advancing to the final. In the 800 metres, Breynck placed second in his initial semifinal heat and did not advance to the final. His time was 2:06.0.

== International career ==
On 16 May 1910, he played his only international, against a Belgium. Like Alfred Berghausen, Lothar Budzinski-Kreth and Christian Schilling, who wanted to follow the match, Breynk was called to the court at short notice by the auditorium been because the team had arrived with only seven players. The match in front of 8,000 spectators in Duisburg, in which he came in for Peco Bauwens in the 55th minute, was lost under these circumstances, however, clearly with 0:3.

== Sources ==
- Cook, Theodore Andrea (1908). The Fourth Olympiad, Being the Official Report. London: British Olympic Association.
- De Wael, Herman (2001). "Athletics 1908". Herman's Full Olympians. Archived from the original on 27 September 2006.
- Wudarski, Pawel (1999). "Wyniki Igrzysk Olimpijskich" (in Polish). Archived from the original on 14 June 2006.
