= Hammerl =

Hammerl is a German surname. Notable people with the surname include:

- Anton Hammerl (1969–2011) South African photojournalist
- Franz Hammerl (1919–2001), German footballer
- László Hammerl (born 1942), Hungarian sports shooter
- Paul Hammerl (born 1990), Austrian politician
- Walter Hammerl, Austrian band member

== See also ==
- Josef Hamerl (born 1931), Austrian football player
- Hämmerli (surname)
