= Forell =

Forell is a surname. Notable people with the surname include:

- Birger Forell (1893–1958), Swedish priest
- Caroline Forell, American legal scholar and professor emerita at the University of Oregon School of Law
- George Forell (1919–2011), Germany scholar, author, lecturer and guest professor in the field of Christian ethics
- Nicholas Forell (1923–1998), German structural engineer and founder and former president of the San Francisco firm Forell/Elsesser Engineers
- Paul Forell (1892–1959), German international footballer
