= Blunk (surname) =

Blunk is a surname. Notable people with the surname include:

- J. B. Blunk (1926–2002), American sculptor
- Krista Blunk, American radio sports announcer
- Megan Blunk (born 1989), American wheelchair basketball player
- Wilhelm Blunk (1902–1975), German footballer
