= Mechling =

Mechling is a surname. Notable people with the surname include:

- Edward Mechling (1878–1938), American middle-distance runner
- Gene Mechling (1909–1975), American basketball player
- Heinrich Mechling (1892–1976), German footballer

== See also ==
- Mechlin (disambiguation)
