= Kuhnt =

Kuhnt is a German surname. Notable people with the surname include:

- Hermann Kuhnt (1850–1925), German ophthalmologist
- Irina Kuhnt (born 1968), German field hockey player
- Werner Kuhnt (1893–?), German footballer

== See also ==
- Kuhn
