= Christian Schilling =

Christian Schilling may refer to:

- Christian Schilling (German footballer) (1879–1955), German international footballer
- Christian Schilling (Austrian footballer) (born 1992), Austrian footballer
- Christian Schwarz-Schilling (born 1930), German politician, entrepreneur and philanthropist
