= Tanzler =

Tanzler is a surname. Notable people with the surname include:

- Carl Tanzler (1877–1952), German-American necrophile
- Hans Tanzler (1927–2013), American politician and judge

== See also ==
- Tanzer
