= Warnken =

Warnken is a surname. Notable people with the surname include:

- Harry Warnken (1884–1951), American gymnast
- Heinz Warnken (1912–1943), German footballer
- Cristián Warnken (born 1961), Chilean literature professor and media personality
- Byron Warnken (1946–2022), American Professor of Law University of Baltimore School of Law
