= Heinz Werner =

Heinz Werner may refer to:

- Heinz Werner (psychologist) (1890–1964), developmental psychologist
- Heinz Werner (footballer, born 1910) (1910–1989), German footballer
- Heinz Werner (footballer, born 1916) (1916–1968), German footballer and coach
- Heinz Werner (Waffen-SS)
