= Joppich =

Joppich is a surname. Notable people with the surname include:

- Alexander Joppich (born 1995), Austrian footballer;
- Karl Joppich (1908–1940), German footballer;
- Peter Joppich (born 1982), German foil fencer.
