= Carl Schulz (disambiguation) =

Carl Schulz (1851–1944) was a Norwegian educator and politician.

Carl Schulz may also refer to:

- Carl Anton Schulz (1831–1884), Baltic-German photographer
- Carl Theodor Schulz (1835–1914), Norwegian gardener
- Carl Schulz (footballer) (1901–1971), German international footballer

== See also ==
- Carl Schultz (disambiguation)
- Karl Schulze (born 1988), German rower
