= Rison =

Rison may refer to:

== People ==
- Rison (surname)

== Places ==
- Rison, Arkansas
  - Rison High School
- Rison, Maryland

== See also ==
- Risong, a township in Tibet
