= Schwedler =

Schwedler is a surname. Notable people with the surname include:

- Alex von Schwedler (born 1980), Chilean footballer
- Johann Wilhelm Schwedler (1823– 1894), German civil engineer and civil servant
- Karl Schwedler (1902–1970), German singer and leader of the Nazi propaganda jazz band Charlie and His Orchestra
- Viktor von Schwedler (1885–1954), German general in the Wehrmacht of Nazi Germany
- Willy Schwedler (1894–1945), German footballer
