= Fritz Fürst =

German footballer

Personal information
- Date of birth: 3 July 1891
- Place of birth: Munich, Germany
- Date of death: 8 June 1954 (aged 62)
- Position: Forward

Senior career*
Years	Team	Apps	(Gls)
1909–1914	Bayern Munich		

International career
1913	Germany	1	(0)
- * Club domestic league appearances and goals

Fritz Fürst (3 July 1891 – 8 June 1954) was a German footballer who played for Bayern Munich between 1909 and 1914. His only game in international competition was on 13 May 1913, Germany against Switzerland. Germany lost 1 to 2, and Fürst was never called back to the national team. Fürst was one of only three Bayern Munich players to play internationally before World War I. (The other two were Max Gablonsky and Ludwig Hofmeister.)
