= Riso (surname) =

Riso is a surname, and may refer to:

- Camillo De Riso (1854–1924), Italian actor and film director
- Don Richard Riso (1946–2012), American writer
- Giovanni Riso, Baron of Colòbria (1836–1901), Italian politician
- Giulietta De Riso (1896–1988), Italian actress
- Hans Riso (1889–1950), German footballer
- Heinrich Riso (1882–1952), German footballer
- Tania Riso (born 1994), Paraguayan footballer

== See also ==
- Rison (surname)
- Risso (surname)
