= Borck =

Borck is a German surname. Notable people with the surname include:

- Hans-Georg Borck (1921–2011), German Hauptmann
- Charles Borck (1917–2008), Filipino basketball player
- Walter Borck (1891–1949), German international footballer
- Sergeant Borck, 1955 West-German drama film
