= Emil Krause =

Emil Krause may refer to

- Emil Krause (footballer, born 1908) (1908–1962), German footballer
- Emil Krause (footballer, born 1950), German footballer
