= Paul Winkler =

Paul Winkler may refer to:

- Paul Winkler (director) (born 1939), German film director active in Australia
- Paul Winkler (publisher) (1898–1982), Jewish-Hungarian journalist, writer, publisher active in France
- Paul Winkler (footballer) (1913–1996), German soccer player
