= Hämmerli (surname) =

Hämmerli, also Haemmerli and Hammerli is a German surname."Haemmerle"

== People ==
- Bernhard M. Hämmerli (born 1958), Swiss computer scientist
- Marco Hämmerli (born 1985), Swiss football defender

== Company ==
- Hämmerli, a Swiss manufacturer of firearms

== See also ==
- Hammerl
