= Hans Biallas =

German footballer

Personal information
- Date of birth: 14 October 1918
- Date of death: 20 August 2009 (aged 90)
- Position: Forward

Senior career*
Years	Team	Apps	(Gls)
1936–1940	TuS Duisburg 48/99		
1941	Preußen Danzig		
1945–1947	TuS Duisburg 48/99		

International career
1938–1939	Germany	3	(1)
- * Club domestic league appearances and goals

Hans Biallas (14 October 1918 – 20 August 2009) was a German international footballer. Mostly he played right-wing. At TuS Duisburg 48/99 Willy Busch, Walter Günther, Friedel Holz and Toni Turek, the 1954 world champion, were among his teammates.
