= Carl Schultz (disambiguation) =

Carl Schultz (born 1939) is a Hungarian-Australian film director.

Carl Schultz may also refer to:

- Carl Heinrich "Bipontinus" Schultz (1805–1867), German botanist
- Carl Heinrich "Schultzenstein" Schultz (1798–1871), German botanist

== See also ==
- Karl Schultz (born 1937), German equestrian
- Karl L. Schultz, commandant of the U.S. Coast Guard, 2018–2022
- Carl Schulz (disambiguation)
- Karl Schulze (born 1988), German rower
