= Walter Günther =

German footballer (1915–1989)

Personal information
- Date of birth: 18 November 1915
- Date of death: March 1989 (aged 73)
- Position: Forward

Senior career*
| Years | Team | Apps | (Gls) |
- TuS Duisburg 48/99

International career
| 1935–1937 | Germany | 4 | (2) |
- * Club domestic league appearances and goals

Walter Günther (18 November 1915 – March 1989) was a German international footballer.

He first played for the Duisburger TSV 1899 (1932-1938), then after a merger for the TuS Duisburg 48/99 (1938-1948) and finally for the Duisburger SpV (1948-1949). From 1933 to 1945 he kicked mainly in the Gauliga Niederrhein (Lower Rhine), one of 16 top-flight divisions formed in the 1933 re-organization of German football under the Third Reich. Willy Busch, Hans Biallas, Friedel Holz and Toni Turek, the 1954 world champion, were among his teammates.

In 1937 he won the Reichsbundpokal with the Niederrhein, in 1944 he was awarded Gaumeister Niederrhein with the Kriegsspielgemeinschaft (War Games Community) TuS 48/99 and the Duisburg SpV.
