= Tanzer =

Tanzer or Tänzer is a surname; Tänzer meaning "dancer" in German. Notable people with the surname include:

- Andreas Tanzer (born 1989), German ice hockey player
- Jacob Tanzer (1935–2018), American attorney
- Johann Tanzer, Canadian sailboat designer
- Katharina Tanzer (born 1995), Austrian judoka
- Kurt Tanzer (1920–1960), World War II Luftwaffe fighter ace
- Philipp Tanzer (born 1977), German men's rights activist
- Stephen Tanzer, American wine critic
- Tommy Tanzer, American baseball agent
- William Tans'ur (born Tanzer, 1706–1783), English hymn-writer, composer and teacher of music

Tänzer

- Aaron Tänzer (1871–1937), Austrian rabbi
- Mihai Tänzer (Hungarian: Táncos Mihály; 1905–1993), Hungarian-Romanian football player
- Willy Tänzer (1889–1949), German footballer

== See also ==
- Tanzer Industries, a Canadian boat builder, 1966–86
