= Fritz Deike =

German footballer

Personal information
- Date of birth: 24 June 1913
- Date of death: 21 October 1973 (aged 60)
- Position: Midfielder

Senior career*
Years	Team	Apps	(Gls)
- Hannover 96

International career
1935	Germany	1	(0)
- * Club domestic league appearances and goals

Fritz Deike (24 June 1913 – 21 October 1973) was a German international footballer. He won the 1938 German football championship with Hannover 96. Alongside Edmund Malecki, he was the first Hannover 96 player to play for the German national team.
