= Eberhardt Illmer =

German footballer

Personal information
- Date of birth: 30 January 1888
- Date of death: 26 December 1955 (aged 67)
- Position: Goalkeeper

Senior career*
Years	Team	Apps	(Gls)
- FV Straßburg

International career
1909	Germany	1	(0)
- * Club domestic league appearances and goals

Eberhardt Illmer (30 January 1888 – 26 December 1955) was a German international footballer.
