= Josef Umbach =

German footballer

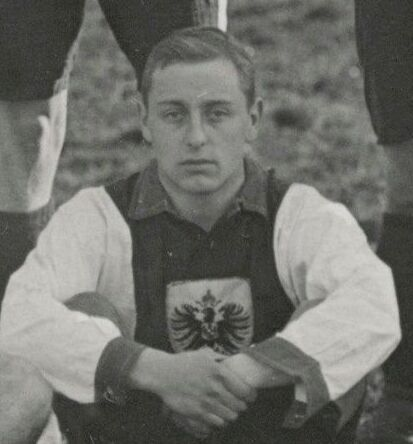
- Josef Umbach in 1910

Personal information
- Date of birth: 8 December 1889
- Date of death: 30 September 1976 (aged 86)
- Position: Forward

Senior career*
Years	Team	Apps	(Gls)
- SC München-Gladbach

International career
1910	Germany	1	(0)
- * Club domestic league appearances and goals

Josef Umbach (8 December 1889 – 30 September 1976) was a German international footballer.
