= Ernst Poetsch =

German footballer

Personal information
- Date of birth: 29 June 1883
- Date of death: 1950 (aged 66–67)
- Position: Midfielder

Senior career*
Years	Team	Apps	(Gls)
- Union 92 Berlin

International career
1908–1910	Germany	3	(0)
- * Club domestic league appearances and goals

Ernst Poetsch (29 June 1883 – 1950) was a German international footballer.
