= Caroline Forell =

American legal scholar

Professor emerita Caroline Forell
- Citizenship: American-Australian

Academic background
- Education: University of Iowa College of Law (BA, JD)

Academic work
- Discipline: Law
- Institutions: University of Oregon School of Law

Caroline A. Forell is a professor emerita at the University of Oregon School of Law. She retired in December 2019.

Forell grew up in Gold Coast, Queensland and is a dual American-Australian citizen. Initially, she wanted to work as a journalist, but turned to law when her application for a newspaper job was explicitly rejected in favor of a lesser qualified male candidate because they already had a woman reporter. After receiving a full scholarship from the University of Queensland, she attended the University of Iowa College of Law where she was an editor of the Iowa Law Review before joining the University of Oregon School of Law faculty in 1978. Her specialisms include legal issues affecting women, tort; comparative law between the United States, Canada, Australia and England, Australian legal history and provocation doctrine.

In addition, she was helped found the Lane County Domestic Violence Council and led the board of directors for Sexual Assault Support Services (SASS) and Breaking Free.

Forell is the coauthor (with Donna Matthews) of the book A Law of Her Own: The Reasonable Woman as a Measure of Man, published by NYU Press.
