= Erich Schröder =

German footballer

Personal information
- Full name: Erich Schröder
- Date of birth: 20 November 1898
- Place of birth: Dresden, German Empire
- Date of death: 24 December 1975 (aged 77)
- Position: Defender

Youth career
- Dresdner SC

Senior career*
Years	Team	Apps	(Gls)
–1932	Dresdner SC		
1918–1932	VfR Köln 04		

International career
1931	Germany	1	(0)
- * Club domestic league appearances and goals

Erich Schröder (20 November 1898 – 24 December 1975) was a German footballer who played as a defender and made one appearance for the Germany national team.

== Career ==
Schröder earned his first and only cap for Germany on 26 April 1931 in a friendly against the Netherlands. The away match, which was played in Amsterdam, finished as a 1–1 draw.

== Personal life ==
Schröder died on 24 December 1975 at the age of 77.

== Career statistics ==
=== International ===
Germany
Year	Apps	Goals
1931	1	0
Total	1	0
