= Gustav Roller =

German footballer

Personal information
- Full name: Gustav Roller
- Date of birth: 19 February 1895
- Place of birth: Pforzheim, German Empire
- Date of death: 20 October 1959 (aged 64)
- Place of death: West Germany
- Position: Defender

Youth career
- 1906–1915: Herta Pforzheim

Senior career*
Years	Team	Apps	(Gls)
1915–1920	VfR Pforzheim		
1920–1933	1. FC Pforzheim		

International career
1924	Germany	1	(0)
- * Club domestic league appearances and goals

Gustav Roller (19 February 1895 – 20 October 1959) was a German footballer who played as a defender and made one appearance for the Germany national team.

== Career ==
Roller earned his first and only cap for Germany on 21 September 1924 in a friendly against Hungary. The away match, which was played in Budapest, finished as a 1–4 loss.

== Personal life ==
Roller died on 20 October 1959 at the age of 64.

== Career statistics ==
=== International ===
Germany
Year	Apps	Goals
1924	1	0
Total	1	0
