= Max Niederbacher =

German association football player

Personal information
- Date of birth: 22 June 1899
- Date of death: June 1979
- Position: Midfielder

Senior career*
Years	Team	Apps	(Gls)
- Stuttgarter Kickers

International career
1925	Germany	1	(0)
- * Club domestic league appearances and goals

Max Niederbacher (22 June 1899 – June 1979) was a German international footballer.
