= Paul Mauch =

German footballer

Personal information
- Date of birth: 8 May 1897
- Date of death: 15 July 1924 (aged 27)
- Position: Goalkeeper

Senior career*
| Years | Team | Apps | (Gls) |
- VfB Stuttgart

International career
| 1922 | Germany | 1 | (0) |
- * Club domestic league appearances and goals

Paul Mauch (8 May 1897 – 15 July 1924) was a German international footballer.
