= Hermann Wiggers =

German footballer

Personal information
- Date of birth: 7 April 1880
- Date of death: 1968
- Position: Defender

Senior career*
Years	Team	Apps	(Gls)
- SC Victoria Hamburg

International career
1911	Germany	1	(0)
- * Club domestic league appearances and goals

Hermann Wiggers (7 April 1880 – 1968) was a German international footballer.
