= Otto Nicodemus =

German footballer

Personal information
- Date of birth: 21 June 1886
- Date of death: 2 December 1966 (aged 80)
- Position: Defender

Senior career*
| Years | Team | Apps | (Gls) |
- SV Wiesbaden

International career
| 1909 | Germany | 1 | (0) |
- * Club domestic league appearances and goals

Otto Nicodemus (21 June 1886 – 2 December 1966) was a German international footballer.
