= Karl Zolper =

German footballer

Personal information
- Date of birth: 30 April 1901
- Position: Goalkeeper

Senior career*
| Years | Team | Apps | (Gls) |
- CfR Köln

International career
| 1925 | Germany | 1 | (0) |
- * Club domestic league appearances and goals

Karl Zolper (born 30 April 1901, date of death unknown) was a German international footballer.
