= Paul Eichelmann =

German footballer

Personal information
- Date of birth: 11 October 1879
- Date of death: 9 December 1938 (aged 59)
- Position: Goalkeeper

Senior career*
| Years | Team | Apps | (Gls) |
- BFC Germania 1888
- Union 92 Berlin

International career
| 1908 | Germany | 2 | (0) |
- * Club domestic league appearances and goals

Paul Eichelmann (11 October 1879 – 9 December 1938) was a German international footballer.
