= Paul Mathies =

German footballer

Personal information
- Date of birth: 12 January 1911
- Position: Midfielder

Senior career*
Years	Team	Apps	(Gls)
- Preußen Danzig

International career
1935	Germany	2	(0)
- * Club domestic league appearances and goals

Paul Mathies (born 12 January 1911, date of death unknown) was a German international footballer.
