= Paul Hammerl =

Austrian politician (born 1990)

Member of the National Council
- Incumbent
- Assumed office 24 October 2024
- Constituency: Hausruckviertel

Personal details
- Born: 24 September 1990 (age 35)
- Party: Freedom Party

Paul Hammerl (born 24 September 1990) is an Austrian politician of the Freedom Party serving as a member of the National Council since 2024. He has been a city councillor of Wels since 2021.
