= Adolf Gehrts =

German footballer

Personal information
- Date of birth: 30 October 1886
- Date of death: 17 January 1943 (aged 56)
- Position: Forward

Senior career*
Years	Team	Apps	(Gls)
- SC Victoria Hamburg

International career
1908–1910	Germany	2	(0)
- * Club domestic league appearances and goals

Adolf Gehrts (30 October 1886 – 17 January 1943) was a German international footballer.
