= Fritz Retter =

German footballer

Personal information
- Date of birth: 2 July 1896
- Date of death: 1 January 1965 (aged 68)
- Position: Midfielder

Senior career*
Years	Team	Apps	(Gls)
- Sportfreunde Stuttgart

International career
1922	Germany	1	(0)
- * Club domestic league appearances and goals

Fritz Retter (2 July 1896 – 1 January 1965) was a German international footballer.
