= Herbert Hirth =

German footballer

Personal information
- Date of birth: 23 January 1884
- Position: Defender

Senior career*
Years	Team	Apps	(Gls)
- BFC Hertha 92

International career
1909	Germany	1	(0)
- * Club domestic league appearances and goals

Herbert Hirth (born 23 January 1884, date of death unknown) was a German international footballer.
