= Fritz Bache =

German footballer

Personal information
- Date of birth: 29 March 1898
- Date of death: 6 December 1959 (aged 61)
- Position: Defender

Senior career*
Years	Team	Apps	(Gls)
- Wacker 04 Berlin
- Hertha BSC

International career
1923–1924	Germany	2	(0)
- * Club domestic league appearances and goals

Fritz Bache (29 March 1898 – 6 December 1959) was a German footballer.
