= Karl Hanssen =

German footballer

Personal information
- Date of birth: 5 July 1887
- Date of death: 13 September 1916 (aged 29)
- Position: Forward

Senior career*
Years	Team	Apps	(Gls)
- Altona 93

International career
1910–1911	Germany	3	(0)
- * Club domestic league appearances and goals

Karl Hanssen (5 July 1887 – 13 September 1916) was a German international footballer.
