= Arthur Mohns =

German footballer (1896–1960)

Personal information
- Date of birth: 4 December 1896
- Date of death: 1960 (aged 63–64)
- Position: Defender

Senior career*
Years	Team	Apps	(Gls)
- Norden-Nordwest Berlin

International career
1920–1922	Germany	5	(0)
- * Club domestic league appearances and goals

Arthur Mohns (4 December 1896 – 1960) was a German international footballer.
