= Rison (surname) =

Rison is a surname, and may refer to:

- Andre Rison (born 1967), American football player
- George T. Rison (1850–1929), American politician
- Mose Rison (1956–2022), American football player and coach
- Vera B. Rison (1939–2015), American politician

== See also ==
- Riso (surname)
