= Otto Jungtow =

German footballer

Personal information
- Date of birth: 29 December 1892
- Date of death: 19 August 1959 (aged 66)
- Position: Midfielder

Senior career*
Years	Team	Apps	(Gls)
- Hertha BSC

International career
1913	Germany	1	(0)
- * Club domestic league appearances and goals

Otto Jungtow (29 December 1892 – 19 August 1959) was a German international footballer.
