= Hermann Neiße =

German footballer

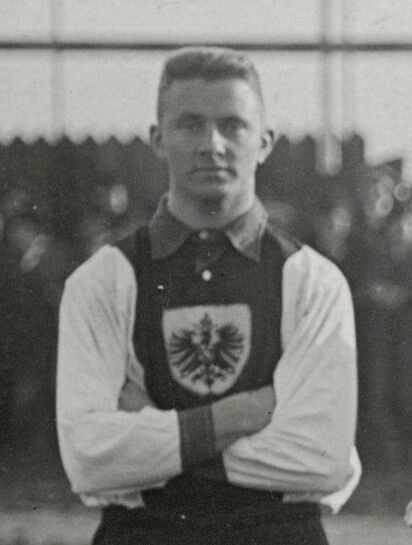
- Hermann Neiße in 1910

Personal information
- Date of birth: 5 December 1889
- Date of death: 20 October 1932 (aged 42)
- Position: Defender

Senior career*
Years	Team	Apps	(Gls)
- Eimsbütteler TV

International career
1910–1911	Germany	3	(0)
- * Club domestic league appearances and goals

Hermann Neiße (5 December 1889 – 20 October 1932) was a German international footballer.
