= Alfred Au =

German footballer

Personal information
- Date of birth: 14 December 1898
- Date of death: 27 October 1986 (aged 87)
- Position: Midfielder

Senior career*
Years	Team	Apps	(Gls)
1917–1930	VfR Mannheim		

International career
1921	Germany	1	(0)
- * Club domestic league appearances and goals

Alfred Au (14 December 1898 – 27 October 1986) was a German international footballer.
