= Eduard Hundt =

German footballer

Personal information
- Date of birth: 3 August 1909
- Date of death: 22 July 2002 (aged 92)
- Position: Defender

Senior career*
Years	Team	Apps	(Gls)
1930–1931	Tennis Borussia Berlin		
1931–1934	Schwarz-Weiß Essen		
1934–1948	Werder Bremen		

International career
1933–1934	Germany	3	(0)
- * Club domestic league appearances and goals

Eduard Hundt (3 August 1909 – 22 July 2002) was a German international footballer.
