= Helmut Sievert =

German footballer

Personal information
- Full name: Helmut Heinrich Karl Sievert
- Date of birth: 12 May 1914
- Place of birth: Ahlten, German Empire
- Date of death: 28 March 1945 (aged 30)
- Place of death: Benešov, Bohemia and Moravia
- Positions: Defender; midfielder

Senior career*
Years	Team	Apps	(Gls)
1932–1941	Hannover 96		
1943–1944	Eintracht Braunschweig		

International career
1936	Germany	1	(0)
- * Club domestic league appearances and goals

Helmut Heinrich Karl Sievert (12 May 1914 – 28 March 1945) was a German footballer who played as a defender or midfielder and made one appearance for the Germany national team.

== Career ==
Sievert earned his first and only cap for Germany on 27 September 1936 in a friendly match against Luxembourg. The home match, which took place in Krefeld, finished as a 7–2 win.

== Personal life ==
A sergeant in the German army, Sievert died in World War II on 28 March 1945 in Benešov, Protectorate of Bohemia and Moravia at the age of 30.

== Career statistics ==
=== International ===
Germany
Year	Apps	Goals
1936	1	0
Total	1	0
