= Erich Fischer (footballer) =

German footballer (1909–1990)

Personal information
- Date of birth: 31 December 1909
- Date of death: December 1990 (aged 80–81)
- Position: Forward

Senior career*
| Years | Team | Apps | (Gls) |
- 1. FC Pforzheim

International career
| 1932–1933 | Germany | 2 | (0) |
- * Club domestic league appearances and goals

Erich Fischer (31 December 1909 – December 1990) was a German international footballer.
