= Fritz Schnürle =

German footballer

Personal information
- Full name: Fritz Schnürle
- Date of birth: 23 February 1898
- Place of birth: Pforzheim, German Empire
- Date of death: 9 November 1937 (aged 39)
- Place of death: Germany
- Position: Forward

Youth career
- VfR Pforzheim

Senior career*
Years	Team	Apps	(Gls)
1918–1919	1. FC Pforzheim		
1919–1920	SpVgg Fürth		
1920–1928	VfL Germania 1894		
19??–1935	VfR Pforzheim		

International career
1921	Germany	1	(0)
- * Club domestic league appearances and goals

Fritz Schnürle (23 February 1898 – 9 November 1937) was a German footballer who played as a forward and made one appearance for the Germany national team.

== Career ==
Schnürle earned his first and only cap for Germany on 5 June 1921 in a friendly against Hungary. The away match, which took place in Budapest, finished as a 0–3 loss.

== Personal life ==
Schnürle died on 9 November 1937 at the age of 39.

== Career statistics ==
=== International ===
Germany
Year	Apps	Goals
1921	1	0
Total	1	0
