= Kurt Meißner =

German footballer

Personal information
- Date of birth: 11 December 1897
- Date of death: 1973
- Position: Forward

Senior career*
Years	Team	Apps	(Gls)
- VfR Mannheim

International career
1924	Germany	1	(0)
- * Club domestic league appearances and goals

Kurt Meißner (11 December 1897 – 1973) was a German international footballer.
