= Hans Mengel =

German footballer

Personal information
- Date of birth: 6 February 1917
- Place of birth: Cologne, Germany
- Date of death: 1 January 1943 (aged 25)
- Place of death: Soviet Union
- Position: Midfielder

Senior career*
Years	Team	Apps	(Gls)
- TuRU Düsseldorf

International career
1938	Germany	1	(0)
- * Club domestic league appearances and goals

Hans Mengel (6 February 1917 – 1 January 1943) was a German footballer who played as a midfielder for TuRU Düsseldorf and the Germany national team.

== Personal life ==
Mengel served in the German Army during the Second World War. He was reported missing in action on the Eastern Front on 1 January 1943. He is commemorated at Sologubovka Cemetery.
