= Otto Reislant =

German footballer

Personal information
- Date of birth: 31 May 1883
- Date of death: 28 January 1968 (aged 84)
- Position: Forward

Senior career*
Years	Team	Apps	(Gls)
- Wacker Leipzig

International career
1910	Germany	1	(0)
- * Club domestic league appearances and goals

Otto Reislant (31 May 1883 – 28 January 1968) was a German international footballer.
