= Hans Weymar =

German footballer

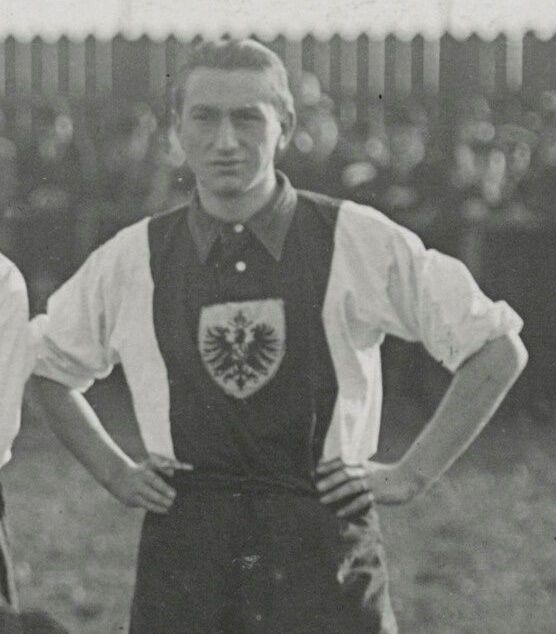
- Hans Weymar in 1910

Personal information
- Full name: Hans Adolph Weymar
- Date of birth: 1 February 1884
- Place of birth: Uelsby, German Empire
- Date of death: 4 July 1959 (aged 75)
- Place of death: Hamburg, West Germany
- Height: 1.71 m (5 ft 7 in)
- Position: Midfielder

Senior career*
Years	Team	Apps	(Gls)
- SC Victoria Hamburg

International career
1908–1910	Germany	4	(0)
- * Club domestic league appearances and goals

Hans Adolph Weymar (1 February 1884 – 4 July 1959) was a German international footballer.
