= Fritz Wetzel =

German footballer

Personal information
- Date of birth: 12 December 1894
- Date of death: 19 January 1982 (aged 87)
- Position: Midfielder

Senior career*
Years	Team	Apps	(Gls)
- 1. FC Pforzheim

International career
1922	Germany	1	(0)
- * Club domestic league appearances and goals

Fritz Wetzel (12 December 1894 – 19 January 1982) was a German international footballer.
