= Erich Pohl =

German footballer

Personal information
- Date of birth: 15 January 1894
- Date of death: 8 November 1948 (aged 54)
- Position: Midfielder

Senior career*
| Years | Team | Apps | (Gls) |
- SC 99 Köln

International career
| 1923 | Germany | 2 | (0) |
- * Club domestic league appearances and goals

Erich Pohl (15 January 1894 – 8 November 1948) was a German international footballer.
