= Otto Löble =

German footballer

Personal information
- Date of birth: 27 October 1888
- Date of death: 29 May 1967 (aged 78)
- Position: Forward

Senior career*
Years	Team	Apps	(Gls)
1907–1913	Stuttgarter Kickers		
1914	Frankfurter FV		
1914–1925	Stuttgarter Kickers		

International career
1909–1913	Germany	4	(0)
- * Club domestic league appearances and goals

Otto Löble (27 October 1888 – 29 May 1967) was a German international footballer.
