= Lothar Richter =

German footballer

Personal information
- Date of birth: 9 June 1912
- Date of death: 20 November 2001 (aged 89)
- Position: Defender

Senior career*
Years	Team	Apps	(Gls)
- Chemnitzer BC

International career
1941	Germany	1	(0)
- * Club domestic league appearances and goals

Lothar Richter (9 June 1912 – 20 November 2001) was a German international footballer.
