= Hans Lohneis =

German footballer

Personal information
- Date of birth: 12 April 1895
- Date of death: 1970
- Position: Defender

Senior career*
Years	Team	Apps	(Gls)
- MTV Fürth

International career
1920	Germany	1	(0)
- * Club domestic league appearances and goals

Hans Lohneis (12 April 1895 – 1970) was a German international footballer.
