= Carl-Heinz Mahlmann =

German footballer

Personal information
- Date of birth: 17 September 1907
- Date of death: 7 November 1965 (aged 58)
- Position: Midfielder

Senior career*
Years	Team	Apps	(Gls)
- Hamburger SV

International career
1932	Germany	1	(0)
- * Club domestic league appearances and goals

Carl-Heinz Mahlmann (17 September 1907 – 7 November 1965) was a German international footballer.
