= Georg Euler =

German footballer

Personal information
- Date of birth: 23 December 1905
- Date of death: 1993
- Position: Forward

Senior career*
Years	Team	Apps	(Gls)
- SpVgg Sülz 07

International career
1936	Germany	1	(0)
- * Club domestic league appearances and goals

Georg Euler (23 December 1905 – 1993) was a German international footballer.
