= Martin Reißmann =

German footballer

Personal information
- Date of birth: 21 September 1900
- Date of death: 8 April 1971 (aged 70)
- Position: Midfielder

Senior career*
| Years | Team | Apps | (Gls) |
- Guts Muths Dresden

International career
| 1923 | Germany | 1 | (0) |
- * Club domestic league appearances and goals

Martin Reißmann (21 September 1900 – 8 April 1971) was a German international footballer.
