= Otto Bökle =

German footballer

Personal information
- Date of birth: 17 February 1912
- Date of death: 16 August 1988 (aged 76)
- Position: Forward

Senior career*
| Years | Team | Apps | (Gls) |
| –1932 | FV Zuffenhausen | | |
| 1932–1950 | VfB Stuttgart | | |

International career
| 1935 | Germany | 1 | (0) |
- * Club domestic league appearances and goals

Otto Bökle (17 February 1912 – 16 August 1988) was a German international footballer.
