= Walter Sorkale =

Former German professional footballer

Personal information
- Full name: Walter Sorkale
- Date of birth: 17 January 1890
- Place of birth: Berlin, German Empire
- Date of death: 18 March 1946 (aged 56)
- Position: Midfielder

Senior career*
Years	Team	Apps	(Gls)
1907–1925	BFC Preussen		

International career
1911	Germany	1	(0)
- * Club domestic league appearances and goals

Walter Sorkale (17 January 1890 – 18 March 1946) was a German footballer who played as a midfielder and made one appearance for the Germany national team.

== Career ==
Sorkale earned his first and only cap for Germany on 29 October 1911 in a friendly against Sweden. The home match, which took place in Hamburg, finished as a 1–3 loss for Germany.

== Personal life ==
Sorkale died on 18 March 1946 at the age of 56.

== Career statistics ==
=== International ===
Germany
Year	Apps	Goals
1911	1	0
Total	1	0
