= Ludwig Wenz =

German footballer

Personal information
- Date of birth: 24 August 1906
- Date of death: 18 April 1968 (aged 61)
- Position: Goalkeeper

Senior career*
| Years | Team | Apps | (Gls) |
- ASV Nuremberg

International career
| 1930 | Germany | 1 | (0) |
- * Club domestic league appearances and goals

Ludwig Wenz (24 August 1906 – 18 April 1968) was a German international footballer.
