= Ernst Eikhof =

German footballer

Personal information
- Date of birth: 6 May 1892
- Date of death: 19 November 1978 (aged 86)
- Position: Defender

Senior career*
Years	Team	Apps	(Gls)
- SC Victoria Hamburg

International career
1923	Germany	3	(0)
- * Club domestic league appearances and goals

Ernst Eikhof (6 May 1892 – 19 November 1978) was a German international footballer.
