= Arthur Marohn =

German footballer

Personal information
- Date of birth: 14 June 1893
- Position: Midfielder

Senior career*
Years	Team	Apps	(Gls)
- BFC Viktoria 1889

International career
1921	Germany	1	(0)
- * Club domestic league appearances and goals

Arthur Marohn (born 14 June 1893, date of death unknown) was a German international footballer.
