= Ludwig Pöhler =

German footballer

Personal information
- Date of birth: 11 January 1916
- Date of death: 26 March 1975 (aged 59)
- Position: Midfielder

Senior career*
Years	Team	Apps	(Gls)
- Hannover 96

International career
1939	Germany	1	(0)
- * Club domestic league appearances and goals

Ludwig Pöhler (11 January 1916 – 26 March 1975) was a German international footballer.
