= Karl Politz =

German footballer

Personal information
- Date of birth: 14 August 1903
- Date of death: 5 September 1987 (aged 84)
- Position: Forward

Senior career*
Years	Team	Apps	(Gls)
- Hamburger SV

International career
1934	Germany	1	(0)
- * Club domestic league appearances and goals

Karl Politz (14 August 1903 – 5 September 1987) was a German international footballer.
