= Otto Hantschick =

German footballer

Personal information
- Date of birth: 11 February 1884
- Date of death: 22 November 1960 (aged 76)
- Position: Defender

Senior career*
Years	Team	Apps	(Gls)
- Union 92 Berlin

International career
1908–1909	Germany	2	(0)
- * Club domestic league appearances and goals

Otto Hantschick (11 February 1884 – 22 November 1960) was a German international footballer.
