= Carl Zörner =

German footballer

Personal information
- Full name: Carl Richard Hugo Ernst Zörner
- Date of birth: 18 June 1895
- Place of birth: Neunkirchen, German Empire
- Date of death: 12 October 1941 (aged 46)
- Place of death: Vyazma, Russian SFSR, Soviet Union
- Position: Goalkeeper

Senior career*
Years	Team	Apps	(Gls)
- SC 99 Köln

International career
1923	Germany	4	(0)
- * Club domestic league appearances and goals

Carl Richard Hugo Ernst Zörner (18 June 1895 – 12 October 1941) was a German international footballer.

== Personal life ==
Zörner was born on 18 June 1895 in Neunkirchen. He died serving on the Russian front as a Hauptmann (captain) in the German army in World War II at the age of 46.
