= Erwin Stührk =

German footballer

Personal information
- Date of birth: 4 July 1910
- Place of birth: Hamburg, Germany
- Date of death: 13 November 1942 (aged 32)
- Place of death: Soviet Union
- Position: Defender

Senior career*
Years	Team	Apps	(Gls)
- Eimsbütteler TV

International career
1935	Germany	3	(0)
- * Club domestic league appearances and goals

Erwin Stührk (4 July 1910 – 13 November 1942) was a German international footballer who played as a defender.

== Personal life ==
Stührk served as a Gefreiter (private) in the German Army during the Second World War. He was killed in action on the Eastern Front on 13 November 1942.
