= Willi Hutter =

German footballer

Personal information
- Date of birth: 3 November 1896
- Date of death: 27 June 1936 (aged 39)
- Position: Forward

Senior career*
Years	Team	Apps	(Gls)
- SV Waldhof Mannheim
- SV Saar 05 Saarbrücken

International career
1921–1922	Germany	2	(0)
- * Club domestic league appearances and goals

Willi Hutter (3 November 1896 – 27 June 1936) was a German international footballer.
