= Paul Matthes =

German footballer

Personal information
- Date of birth: 6 March 1879
- Date of death: 31 March 1949
- Position: Forward

Senior career*
Years	Team	Apps	(Gls)
- SV Victoria 96 Magdeburg

International career
1908	Germany	1	(0)
- * Club domestic league appearances and goals

Paul Matthes (6 March 1879 – 1948) was a German international. His number was 10 footballer.
