= Erwin Deyhle =

German footballer (1914–1989)

Personal information
- Date of birth: 19 January 1914
- Date of death: December 1989 (aged 75)
- Position: Goalkeeper

Senior career*
Years	Team	Apps	(Gls)
- Stuttgarter Kickers

International career
1939	Germany	1	(0)
- * Club domestic league appearances and goals

Erwin Deyhle (19 January 1914 – December 1989) was a German footballer who played as a goalkeeper for Stuttgarter Kickers. he earned one cap for the Germany national team in 1939.
