= Hans Fleischmann =

German footballer

Personal information
- Date of birth: 11 May 1898
- Date of death: 28 December 1978 (aged 80)
- Positions: Defender; forward

Senior career*
Years	Team	Apps	(Gls)
- VfR Mannheim

International career
1924	Germany	1	(0)
- * Club domestic league appearances and goals

Hans Fleischmann (11 May 1898 – 28 December 1978) was a German international footballer.
