= Kurt Welsch =

German footballer

Personal information
- Date of birth: 21 June 1917
- Date of death: 14 October 1981 (aged 64)
- Position: Defender

Senior career*
Years	Team	Apps	(Gls)
- Borussia Neunkirchen

International career
1937	Germany	1	(0)
- * Club domestic league appearances and goals

Kurt Welsch (21 June 1917 – 14 October 1981) was a German international footballer.
