= Heinrich Sonnrein =

German footballer

Personal information
- Full name: Heinrich Sonnrein
- Date of birth: 28 March 1911
- Place of birth: Hanau, Germany
- Date of death: 3 February 1944 (aged 32)
- Place of death: Monte Cassino, Italy
- Position: Goalkeeper

Senior career*
Years	Team	Apps	(Gls)
1930–1942	FC Hanau 93		

International career
1935–1936	Germany	2	(0)
- * Club domestic league appearances and goals

Heinrich Sonnrein (28 March 1911 – 3 February 1944), nicknamed Heini, was a German footballer who played as a goalkeeper and made two appearances for the Germany national team.

== Career ==
Sonnrein was the captain of FC Hanau 93, playing for the team between 1930 and 1942.

Sonnrein made his international debut for Germany on 15 September 1935 in a friendly match against Estonia, which finished as a 5–0 win in Stettin. He earned his second and final cap on 15 March 1936 in a friendly against Hungary, which finished as a 2–3 loss in Budapest.

== Personal life ==
Sonnrein worked as a bank employee in Hanau, and was a hobby painter. He died in World War II, serving as a lieutenant in the German army, at the Battle of Monte Cassino on 3 February 1944 at the age of 32.

== Career statistics ==
=== International ===
Germany
Year	Apps	Goals
1935	1	0
1936	1	0
Total	2	0
