= Ludwig Philipp =

German footballer and manager

Personal information
- Date of birth: 20 December 1889
- Date of death: 4 January 1964 (aged 74)
- Position: Midfielder

Senior career*
Years	Team	Apps	(Gls)
- 1. FC Nürnberg

International career
1910	Germany	2	(0)

Managerial career
- 1947: SpVgg Fürth
- * Club domestic league appearances and goals

Ludwig Philipp (20 December 1889 – 4 January 1964) was a German international footballer and later manager.
