= Robert Hense =

German footballer

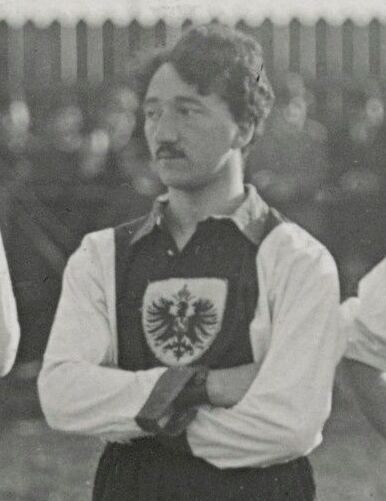
- Robert Hense in 1910

Personal information
- Date of birth: 17 November 1885
- Date of death: 20 June 1966 (aged 80)
- Position: Defender

Senior career*
Years	Team	Apps	(Gls)
- Kölner BC 01

International career
1910	Germany	1	(0)
- * Club domestic league appearances and goals

Robert Hense (17 November 1885, Cologne – 20 June 1966) was a German international footballer.
