= Hans Riso =

German footballer (1889–1950)

Personal information
- Date of birth: 16 March 1889
- Place of birth: Leipzig, German Empire
- Date of death: 1950 (aged 60–61)
- Position: Goalkeeper

Senior career*
Years	Team	Apps	(Gls)
- Wacker Leipzig

International career
1910	Germany	1	(0)
- * Club domestic league appearances and goals

Hans Riso (16 March 1889 – 1950) was a German international footballer.
