= Heinz Warnken =

German footballer

Personal information
- Date of birth: 28 December 1912
- Place of birth: Bremen, Germany
- Date of death: 1943
- Position: Midfielder

Senior career*
Years	Team	Apps	(Gls)
- Komet Bremen

International career
1935	Germany	1	(0)
- * Club domestic league appearances and goals

Heinz Warnken (28 December 1912 – 1943) was a German footballer who played as a midfielder for Komet Bremen and the Germany national team. He was killed serving in the German army during World War II in 1943.
