= Willy Tänzer =

German footballer

Personal information
- Full name: Willy Tänzer
- Date of birth: 12 December 1889
- Place of birth: Germany
- Date of death: 30 November 1949 (aged 59)
- Position: Defender

Senior career*
Years	Team	Apps	(Gls)
1904–1914	Berliner SC		
- Breslau
- BFC Germania 1888

International career
1908	Germany	1	(0)
- * Club domestic league appearances and goals

Willy Tänzer (12 December 1889 – 30 November 1949) was a German international footballer who played for Berliner SC.
