= Max Gablonsky =

German sprinter and footballer

Max "Gaberl" Gablonsky
Personal information
- Date of birth: 1 January 1890
- Date of death: 16 July 1969 (aged 79)
- Position: Right winger

Senior career*
| Years | Team | Apps | (Gls) |
- FC Bayern Munich

International career
| 1910–1911 | Germany | 4 | |
- * Club domestic league appearances and goals

Max ("Gaberl") Gablonsky (1 January 1890 - 16 July 1969) was a German footballer and track athlete.

In 1910 Gablonsky became the first Bayern Munich player called into the Germany national team. Up through 1911, he was capped a total of 4 times by the national team. As a right-winger, he played over 500 games for Bayern until the end of his career in 1922.

Two years later, Gablonsky was included in the German 4 × 100 m relay team for the Olympic Games in Stockholm. However, he was unable to take part in the games. His son and grandson requested that German Football Federation should give Gablonsky credit for a goal, which was done in September 2011. They referred to local archives in Stuttgart as proof.

== Personal life ==
Gablonsky has a son and a grandson. He lost most of his personal belonging in an air raid on Munich in 1944.
