= Franz Jelinek =

Austrian footballer

Personal information
- Date of birth: 19 July 1922
- Place of birth: Vienna, Austria
- Date of death: 20 May 1944 (aged 21)
- Place of death: Italy
- Position: Forward

Senior career*
Years	Team	Apps	(Gls)
- Wiener Sport-Club

International career
1940	Germany	1	(0)
- * Club domestic league appearances and goals

Franz Jelinek (19 July 1922 – 20 May 1944) was an Austrian footballer who played as a forward for Wiener Sport-Club and the Germany national team.

== Personal life ==
Jelinek served as an obergefreiter (corporal) in the German Army during the Second World War. He was killed in action in Italy on 20 May 1944 and was buried in Monte Cassino German war cemetery.
