= Fritz Balogh =

German footballer

Personal information
- Date of birth: 16 December 1920
- Place of birth: Bratislava, Czechoslovakia
- Date of death: 14 January 1951 (aged 30)
- Place of death: Nersingen, West Germany
- Position: Forward

Senior career*
Years	Team	Apps	(Gls)
1938–1940	SC Freiburg		
1941–1945	Hertha BSC		
1945–1946	SV Phönix 03		
1946–1951	VfL Neckarau		

International career
1950	West Germany	1	(0)
- * Club domestic league appearances and goals

Fritz Balogh (16 December 1920 – 14 January 1951) was a German footballer who played as a forward. His first club was DSK Preßburg (Bratislava). In 1941, he joined Hertha BSC as a wartime guest player.

After the Second World War, Balogh played for VfL Neckarau. On 22 November 1950 he participated in his first and only international in the West Germany national team, a 1–0 victory against Switzerland. This became the only national-level appearance from a player playing for VfL Neckarau.

Balogh fell from a train when returning from a match against Bayern Munich on 14 January 1951. He succumbed to his injuries a day later.

== Selected filmography ==
- Das große Spiel (1942)
