= Hermann Garrn =

German footballer

Personal information
- Full name: Hermann Ehlers
- Date of birth: 11 March 1888
- Date of death: 27 March 1966 (aged 78)
- Position: Forward

Senior career*
Years	Team	Apps	(Gls)
- SC Victoria Hamburg

International career
1908–1909	Germany	2	(0)
- * Club domestic league appearances and goals

Hermann Garrn (11 March 1888 – 27 March 1966), also sometimes known as Hermann Ehlers, was a German international footballer who played for SC Victoria Hamburg.
