= Heinz Werner (footballer, born 1910) =

German footballer

Personal information
- Date of birth: 17 August 1910
- Date of death: 6 May 1989 (aged 78)
- Position: Midfielder

Senior career*
| Years | Team | Apps | (Gls) |
- 1. SV Jena

International career
| 1935 | Germany | 1 | (0) |
- * Club domestic league appearances and goals

Heinz Werner (17 August 1910 – 6 May 1989) was a German international footballer.
