= Alfred Berghausen =

German footballer

Personal information
- Date of birth: 9 December 1889
- Position: Defender

Senior career*
Years	Team	Apps	(Gls)
1905–1914	Preußen Duisburg		

International career
1910	Germany	1	(0)
- * Club domestic league appearances and goals

Alfred Berghausen (born 9 December 1889, date of death unknown) was a German international footballer.
