= Willibald Schmaus =

Austrian and German footballer

Personal information
- Full name: Willibald Schmaus
- Date of birth: 16 June 1912
- Place of birth: Vienna, Austria-Hungary
- Date of death: 27 April 1979 (aged 66)
- Place of death: Vienna, Austria
- Position: Defender

Senior career*
Years	Team	Apps	(Gls)
1929–1949	First Vienna		

International career
1935–1937	Austria	15	(0)
1938–1942	Germany	10	(0)
- * Club domestic league appearances and goals

Willibald Schmaus (16 June 1912 – 27 April 1979) was an Austrian football defender. He represented both Austria and Germany internationally.

== Career ==
He earned 14 caps for the Austria national football team and participated in the 1934 FIFA World Cup. After the annexation of Austria by Germany, he earned 10 caps for the Germany national football team, and participated in the 1938 FIFA World Cup. He spent his club career at First Vienna FC 1894.
