= Hans Mock =

Austrian footballer

Personal information
- Full name: Johann Mock
- Date of birth: 9 December 1906
- Place of birth: Vienna, Austria-Hungary
- Date of death: 22 May 1982 (aged 75)
- Position: Midfielder

Senior career*
Years	Team	Apps	(Gls)
1924–1927	FC Nicholson		
1927–1942	Austria Vienna		

International career
1929–1937	Austria	12	(0)
1938–1942	Germany	5	(0)
- * Club domestic league appearances and goals

Johann "Hans" Mock (9 December 1906 – 22 May 1982) was an Austrian football midfielder.

He earned 12 caps for the Austria national football team. After the annexation of Austria by Germany, he earned 5 caps for the Germany national football team, and participated in the 1938 FIFA World Cup.

== Career ==
- FC Nicholson (1924–1927)
- FK Austria Wien (1927–1942)
