= Carl Schulz (footballer) =

German footballer

Personal information
- Date of birth: 11 August 1901
- Date of death: 9 March 1971 (aged 69)
- Position: Forward

Senior career*
Years	Team	Apps	(Gls)
- Holstein Kiel

International career
1925	Germany	2	(0)
- * Club domestic league appearances and goals

Carl Schulz (11 August 1901 – 9 March 1971) was a German international footballer.
