= Werner Schulz (footballer) =

German footballer (1913–1947)

Personal information
- Date of birth: 22 June 1913
- Place of birth: Swakopmund, German South West Africa
- Date of death: 3 May 1947 (aged 33)
- Position: Midfielder

Senior career*
Years	Team	Apps	(Gls)
1932–	SV Arminia Hannover		

International career
1935–1938	Germany	4	(0)
- * Club domestic league appearances and goals

Werner Schulz (22 June 1913 – 3 May 1947) was a German professional footballer.
