= Wilhelm Trautmann =

German footballer

Personal information
- Date of birth: 6 December 1888
- Date of death: 24 July 1969 (aged 80)
- Position: Midfielder

Senior career*
Years	Team	Apps	(Gls)
- Viktoria Mannheim

International career
1910	Germany	1	(0)
- * Club domestic league appearances and goals

Wilhelm Trautmann (6 December 1888 – 24 July 1969) was a German international footballer.

He played for Viktoria Mannheim and later for VfR Mannheim.
