= Paul Forell =

German footballer

Personal information
- Date of birth: 14 January 1892
- Date of death: 3 August 1959 (aged 67)
- Position: Midfielder

Senior career*
Years	Team	Apps	(Gls)
- 1. FC Pforzheim

International career
1920	Germany	1	(0)
- * Club domestic league appearances and goals

Paul Forell (14 January 1892 – 3 August 1959) was a German international footballer.
