= Ernst Nagelschmitz =

German footballer

Personal information
- Date of birth: 1 May 1902
- Place of birth: Budapest, Austria-Hungary
- Date of death: 23 May 1987 (aged 85)
- Place of death: Munich, West Germany
- Position: Midfielder

Senior career*
Years	Team	Apps	(Gls)
1919–1937	Bayern Munich	224	(4)

International career
1926	Germany	1	(0)
- * Club domestic league appearances and goals

Ernst Nagelschmitz (1 May 1902 – 23 May 1987) was a German footballer who played as a midfielder. He made one appearance for the Germany national football team, in a 4–2 win against the Netherlands on 18 April 1926. Two years later he was in the squad for the 1928 Olympics in Amsterdam, but did not play. He spent his club career with Bayern Munich, and was part of the team which won the 1932 German football championship.
