= Karl Joppich =

German footballer

Personal information
- Date of birth: 6 January 1908
- Date of death: 15 July 1940 (aged 32)
- Position: Midfielder

Senior career*
Years	Team	Apps	(Gls)
- SV Hoyerswerda

International career
1932	Germany	0	(0)
- * Club domestic league appearances and goals

Karl Joppich (6 January 1908 – 15 July 1940) was a German footballer. He is often falsely listed as an international, although he never played for Germany
