= Wilhelm Blunk =

German footballer

Personal information
- Date of birth: 12 December 1902
- Date of death: 25 October 1975 (aged 72)
- Position: Goalkeeper

Senior career*
Years	Team	Apps	(Gls)
1922–1925	VfR Neumünster		
1925–2014	Hamburger SV		

International career
1929	Germany	1	(0)
- * Club domestic league appearances and goals

Wilhelm Blunk (12 December 1902 – 25 October 1975) was a German international footballer.
