= Paul Winkler (footballer) =

German footballer

Personal information
- Date of birth: 22 August 1913
- Date of death: 1996
- Position: Forward

Senior career*
Years	Team	Apps	(Gls)
- Schwarz-Weiß Essen

International career
1938	Germany	1	(0)
- * Club domestic league appearances and goals

Paul Winkler (22 August 1913 – 1996) was a German international footballer.
