= Franz Hammerl =

German footballer

Personal information
- Date of birth: 9 October 1919
- Date of death: August 2001 (aged 81)
- Position: Midfielder

Senior career*
Years	Team	Apps	(Gls)
- Post SV München

International career
1940	Germany	1	(0)
- * Club domestic league appearances and goals

Franz Hammerl (9 October 1919 – August 2001) was a German international footballer.
