= Emil Krause (footballer, born 1908) =

German footballer

Personal information
- Date of birth: 21 January 1908
- Date of death: 2 August 1962 (aged 54)
- Position: Defender

Senior career*
Years	Team	Apps	(Gls)
1926–1931	SC Wacker 04 Tegel		
1931–1932	Tennis Borussia Berlin		
1932–1944	Hertha BSC		

International career
1933	Germany	1	(0)
- * Club domestic league appearances and goals

Emil Krause (21 January 1908 – 2 August 1962) was a German international footballer.
