= Reinhard Schaletzki =

German footballer

Personal information
- Date of birth: 21 May 1916
- Place of birth: Gleiwitz, Upper Silesia
- Date of death: 21 March 1995 (aged 78)
- Position: Midfielder

Senior career*
Years	Team	Apps	(Gls)
- Vorwärts-Rasensport Gleiwitz

International career
1939	Germany	2	(1)
- * Club domestic league appearances and goals

Reinhard Schaletzki (21 May 1916 – 21 March 1995), born in Upper Silesia, was a German international footballer.
