= Alexander Martinek =

Austrian footballer (1919–1944)

Personal information
- Date of birth: 25 April 1919
- Place of birth: Krems an der Donau, Austria
- Date of death: 8 July 1944 (aged 25)
- Position: Goalkeeper

Senior career*
Years	Team	Apps	(Gls)
1938–1939	Kremser SC		
1939–1942	Wacker Wien		
1942–1943	Hamburger SV		
1944–1944	HSV Groß Born		

International career
1940	Germany	1	(0)
- * Club domestic league appearances and goals

Alexander Martinek (25 April 1919 – 8 July 1944) was an Austrian footballer who played as a goalkeeper for Kremser SC, Wacker Wien, Hamburger SV, HSV Groß Born and the Germany national team.
