= Ludwig Hofmeister =

German footballer

Personal information
- Date of birth: 5 December 1887
- Place of birth: Sünching, Germany
- Date of death: 3 October 1959 (aged 71)
- Position: Goalkeeper

Senior career*
Years	Team	Apps	(Gls)
1904–1913	Bayern Munich		
1913–1920	Stuttgarter Kickers		
1920–1922	Bayern Munich		

International career
1912–1914	Germany	2	(0)
- * Club domestic league appearances and goals

Ludwig Hofmeister (5 December 1887 – 3 October 1959) was a German footballer.

== Career ==
Hofmeister made two appearances for Germany, appearing twice against the Netherlands in 1912 and 1914.
