= Edmund Malecki =

German footballer

Personal information
- Date of birth: 1 November 1914
- Place of birth: Hanover, Germany
- Date of death: 21 April 2001 (aged 86)
- Position: Forward

Youth career
- 1923–1931: Borussia Hannover

Senior career*
| Years | Team | Apps | (Gls) |
| 1931–1934 | Arminia Hannover | | |
| 1934–1947 | Hannover 96 | | |
| 1939 | → Wormatia Worms (guest player) | 2 | (0) |
| 1943 | → Admira Vienna (guest player) | | |
| 1947–1952 | MTV Braunschweig | | |

International career
| 1935–1939 | Germany | 5 | (2) |

Managerial career
- 1947–1952: MTV Braunschweig (player manager)
- * Club domestic league appearances and goals

Edmund Malecki (1 November 1914 – 21 April 2001) was a German international footballer.

== Honours ==
- German championship winner: 1938
