= Walter Borck =

German footballer

Personal information
- Date of birth: 1 May 1891
- Date of death: 5 January 1949 (aged 57)
- Position: Goalkeeper

Senior career*
Years	Team	Apps	(Gls)
- MTV München 1879

International career
1911	Germany	1	(0)
- * Club domestic league appearances and goals

Walter Borck (1 May 1891 – 5 January 1949) was a German international footballer.
