= Heinrich Mechling =

German association football player

Personal information
- Date of birth: 25 February 1892
- Date of death: 27 December 1976 (aged 84)
- Position: Forward

Senior career*
Years	Team	Apps	(Gls)
- Freiburger FC

International career
1912–1913	Germany	2	(1)
- * Club domestic league appearances and goals

Heinrich Mechling (25 February 1892 – 27 December 1976) was a German international footballer.
