= Werner Kuhnt =

German footballer

Personal information
- Date of birth: 27 October 1893
- Position: Goalkeeper

Senior career*
| Years | Team | Apps | (Gls) |
- SV Norden-Nordwest
- Eckernförder SV

International career
| 1924 | Germany | 1 | (0) |
- * Club domestic league appearances and goals

Werner Kuhnt (born 27 October 1893, date of death unknown) was a German international footballer.
