= Willy Schwedler =

German footballer

Personal information
- Date of birth: 4 August 1894
- Date of death: 26 March 1945 (aged 50)
- Position: Goalkeeper

Senior career*
Years	Team	Apps	(Gls)
- VfB Pankow

International career
1921	Germany	1	(0)
- * Club domestic league appearances and goals

Willy Schwedler (4 August 1894 – 26 March 1945) was a German international footballer.
