= Lothar Budzinski-Kreth =

German footballer

Personal information
- Date of birth: 7 August 1886
- Date of death: 1 March 1955 (aged 68)
- Position: Midfielder

Senior career*
| Years | Team | Apps | (Gls) |
- Duisburger SV

International career
| 1910 | Germany | 1 | (0) |
- * Club domestic league appearances and goals

Lothar Budzinski-Kreth (7 August 1886 – 1 March 1955) was a German international footballer.
