= Josef Pekarek =

Austrian footballer

Personal information
- Date of birth: 2 January 1913
- Place of birth: Bad Vöslau, Austria-Hungary
- Date of death: 30 November 1991 (aged 78)
- Position: Midfielder

Senior career*
Years	Team	Apps	(Gls)
1927–1933	1. Wiener Neustädter SC		
1933–1940	SC Wacker Wien		

International career
1937	Austria	5	(0)
1939	Germany	1	(0)
- * Club domestic league appearances and goals

Josef Pekarek (2 January 1913 – 30 November 1991) was a footballer who played international football for both Austria and Germany. He played as a midfielder for 1. Wiener Neustädter SC and SC Wacker Wien.
