= Friedel Holz =

German footballer (1919–1941)

Personal information
- Full name: Friedrich-Karl Holz
- Date of birth: 21 January 1919
- Date of death: 20 May 1941 (aged 22)
- Place of death: Crete, Greece
- Position: Forward

Senior career*
Years	Team	Apps	(Gls)
- Duisburg 99

International career
1938	Germany	1	(0)
- * Club domestic league appearances and goals

Friedrich-Karl "Friedel" Holz (21 January 1919 – 20 May 1941) was a German international footballer.

== Personal life ==
Holz served as a stabsgefreiter (corporal) in the German military during the Second World War and was killed in action in Crete on 20 May 1941. He is commemorated on a plaque at Maleme war cemetery.
