= Christian Schilling (German footballer) =

German footballer

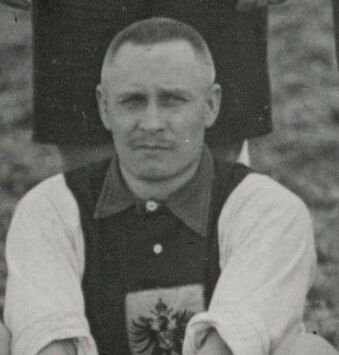
- Christian Schilling in 1910

Personal information
- Date of birth: 11 October 1879
- Date of death: 14 July 1955 (aged 75)
- Position: Forward

Senior career*
Years	Team	Apps	(Gls)
- Duisburger SV

International career
1910	Germany	2	(0)
- * Club domestic league appearances and goals

Christian Schilling (11 October 1879 – 14 July 1955) was a German international footballer.
