= 1908 German football championship =

1908 German championship
Deutsche Fußballmeisterschaft
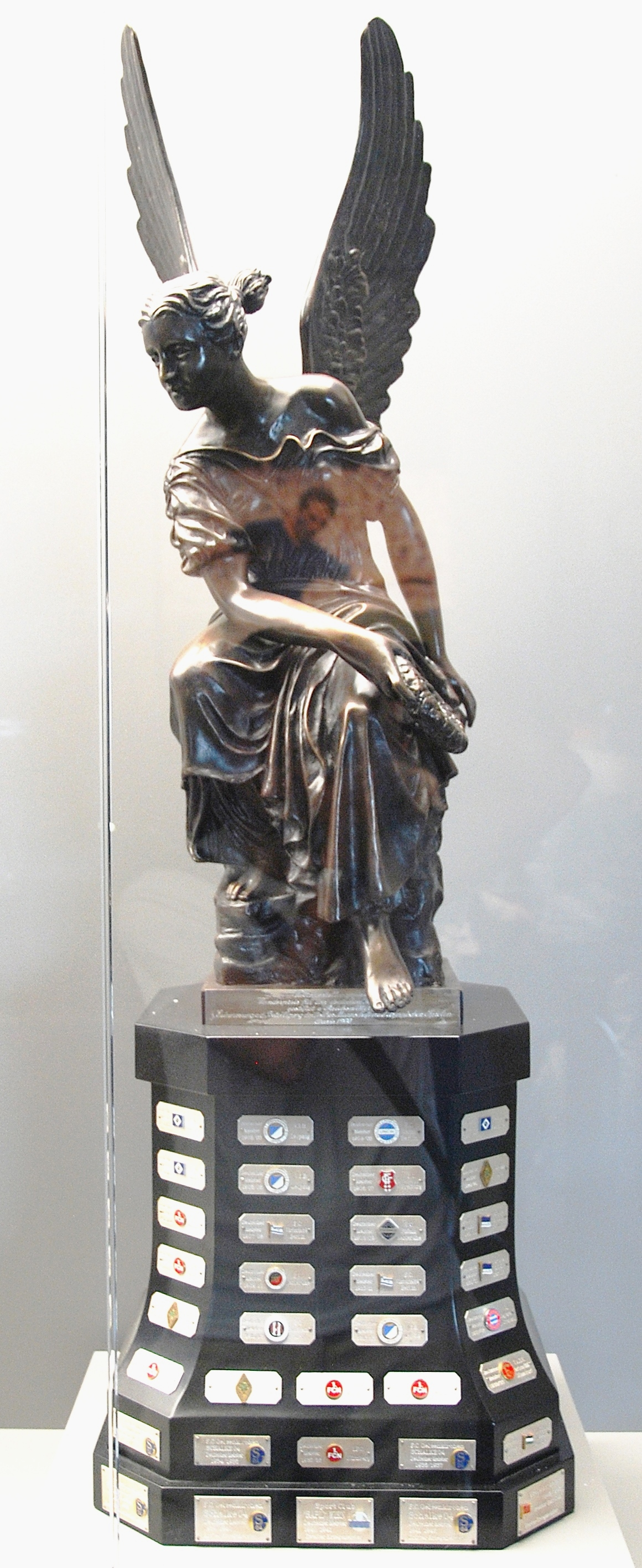
- Replica of the Viktoria trophy

Tournament details
- Country: Germany
- Dates: 3 May – 7 June
- Teams: 8

Final positions
- Champions: Viktoria 89 Berlin; 1st German title
- Runner-up: Stuttgarter Kickers

Tournament statistics
- Matches played: 8
- Goals scored: 34 (4.25 per match)
- Top goal scorer(s): Willi Worpitzky (6 goals)

The 1908 German football championship, the sixth edition of the competition, was won by Viktoria 89 Berlin, defeating Stuttgarter Kickers 3–1 in the final.

For Viktoria 89 Berlin it was the first national title, having lost the previous season's final to Freiburger FC. The club would make another losing appearance in the final in the following season before winning its second title in 1911. For the Stuttgarter Kickers it was the club's sole appearance in the championship final.

Viktoria's Willi Worpitzky was the top scorers of the 1908 championship with six goals.

Eight clubs qualified for the competition played in knock-out format, the champions of each of the seven regional football championships and the defending German champions.

== Qualified teams ==
The teams qualified through the regional championships:

Club	Qualified as
VfB Königsberg	Baltic champions
VfR Breslau	South Eastern German champions
Viktoria 89 Berlin	Berlin champions (Verband Berliner Ballspielvereine)
Wacker Leipzig	Central German champions
Eintracht Braunschweig	Northern German champions
Duisburger SpV	Western German champions
Stuttgarter Kickers	Southern German champions
Freiburger FC	Holder

== Competition ==
=== Quarter-finals ===
The quarter-finals, played on 3 May 1908, with the replay played on 17 May:

Team 1	Score	Team 2
Stuttgarter Kickers	0–1^{1}	Freiburger FC
Viktoria 89 Berlin	7–0	VfB Königsberg
Duisburger SpV	1–0	Eintracht Braunschweig
Wacker Leipzig	3–1	VfR Breslau

- ^{1} declared void.

==== Replay ====
Team 1	Score	Team 2
Stuttgarter Kickers	5–2	Freiburger FC

=== Semi-finals ===
The semi-finals, played on 17 and 24 May 1908:

Team 1	Score	Team 2
Stuttgarter Kickers	5–1	Duisburger SpV
Viktoria 89 Berlin	4–0	Wacker Leipzig

=== Final ===
7 June 1908

Viktoria 89 Berlin	3 – 1	Stuttgarter Kickers
Worpitzky 6', 84'; Röpnack 89'	Report	Ahorn 86'

Germania-Platz Tempelhof, Berlin
Attendance: 4,000
Referee: Götzel

VIKTORIA BERLIN
(German Empire) Paul Scranowitz
(German Empire) Helmut Röpnack
(German Empire) Willi Hahn
(German Empire) Paul Fischer
(German Empire) Willi Moeck
(German Empire) Willi Knesebeck
(German Empire) Paul Hunder
(German Empire) Reinhold Bock
(German Empire) Otto Pauke
(German Empire) Willy Worpitzky
(German Empire) Otto Dumke
Manager:

STUTTGARTER KICKERS
(German Empire) Richard Rüdinger
(German Empire) Eugen Merkle
(German Empire) Hermann Bürkle
(German Empire) Paul Kühnle
(German Empire) Carl Breitmeyer
(German Empire) Gustav Unfried
(German Empire) Hans Krebs
(German Empire) Rudolf Ahorn
(German Empire) Schmitt
(German Empire) Megner
(German Empire) Ingo Hanselmann
Manager:
