= 1909 German football championship =

1909 German championship
Deutsche Fußballmeisterschaft
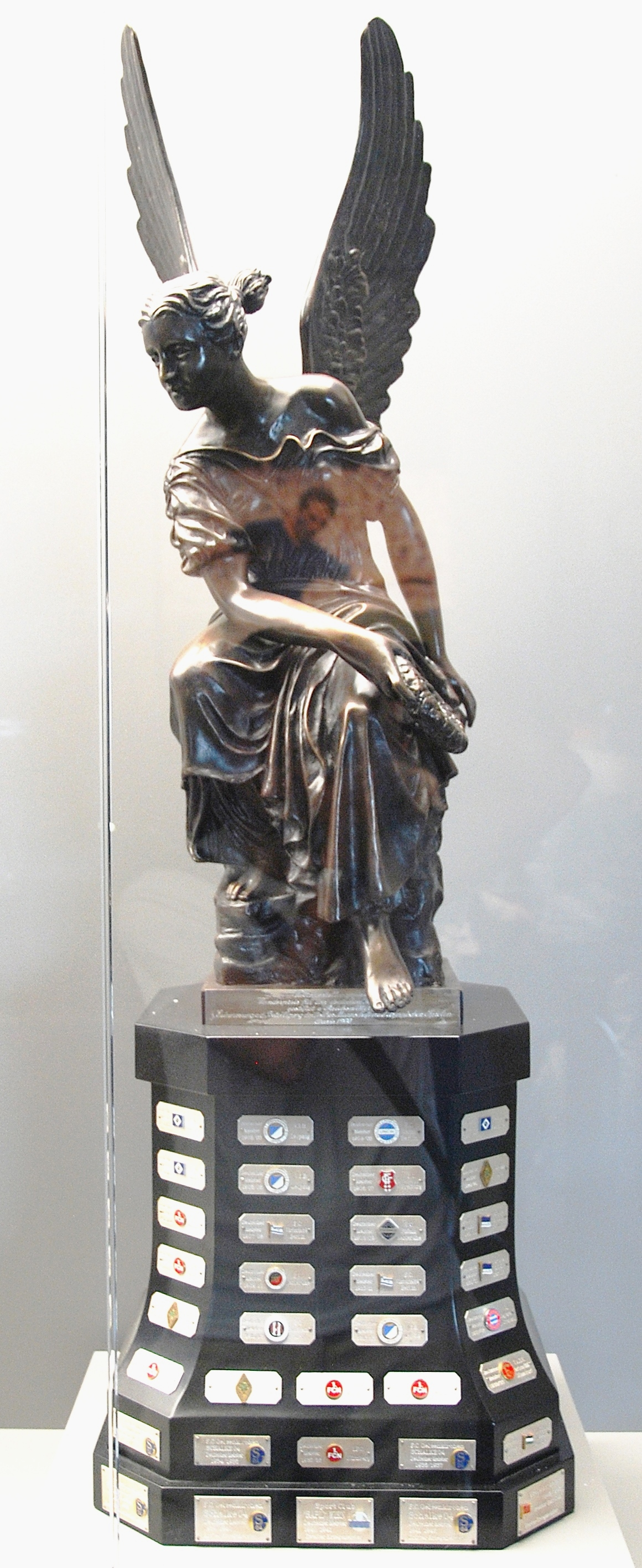
- Replica of the Viktoria trophy

Tournament details
- Country: Germany
- Dates: 2–30 May
- Teams: 8

Final positions
- Champions: Phönix Karlsruhe; 1st German title
- Runner-up: Viktoria 89 Berlin

Tournament statistics
- Matches played: 7
- Goals scored: 54 (7.71 per match)
- Top goal scorer(s): Willi Worpitzky (7 goals)

The 1909 German football championship, the seventh edition of the competition, was won by Phönix Karlsruhe, defeating Viktoria 89 Berlin 4–2 in the final.

For Phönix Karlsruhe it was the club's only appearance in the German championship final. Phönix would later merge with VfB Mühlburg to form Karlsruher SC, with the latter making a losing appearance in the 1956 final. Viktoria 89 Berlin, the defending champions, played its third consecutive final in 1909, having lost in 1907 and won it in 1908. Viktoria would go on to make one more final appearance, winning the competition for a second time in 1911.

Viktoria's Willy Worpitzky was the top scorer of the 1909 championship with seven goals.

Eight clubs qualified for the competition played in knock-out format, the champions of each of the eight regional football championships, Berlin sending the champions of two rival competitions to the finals.

== Qualified teams ==
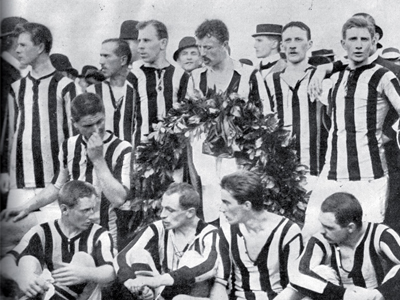
The Phönix Karlsruhe team that won the 1909 final

The teams qualified through the regional championships:

Club	Qualified as
VfB Königsberg	Baltic champions
Alemannia Cottbus	South Eastern German champions
Viktoria 89 Berlin	Berlin champions (Verband Berliner Ballspielvereine)
Tasmania Rixdorf	March football champions (Märkischer Fußball-Bund)
SC Erfurt	Central German champions
Altonaer FC 93	Northern German champions
FC Mönchengladbach	Western German champions
Phönix Karlsruhe	Southern German champions

== Competition ==
=== Quarter-finals ===
The quarter-finals, played on 2 and 16 May 1909:

Team 1	Score	Team 2
Altonaer FC 93	4–2	Tasmania Berlin
Phönix Karlsruhe	5–0	FC Mönchengladbach
SC Erfurt	4–3 aet	Alemannia Cottbus
Viktoria 89 Berlin	12–1	VfB Königsberg

=== Semi-finals ===
The semi-finals, played on 16 and 23 May 1909:

Team 1	Score	Team 2
Phönix Karlsruhe	9–1	SC Erfurt
Viktoria 89 Berlin	7–0	Altonaer FC 93

=== Final ===
30 May 1909

Phönix Karlsruhe	4 – 2	Viktoria 89 Berlin
Beier 30'; Noe 34', 65'; Leibold 55'	Report	Worpitzky 16'; Röpnack 83'

Platz des SC Schlesien, Breslau
Attendance: 1,500
Referee: Hinze

PHÖNIX KARLSRUHE
(German Empire) Otto Michaelis
(German Empire) Robert Neumaier
(German Empire) Ernst Karth
(German Empire) Arthur Beier
(German Empire) Karl Schweinshaut
(German Empire) Otto Reiser
(German Empire) Robert Heger
(German Empire) Karl Wegele
(German Empire) Emil Oberle
(German Empire) Wilhelm Noe
(German Empire) Hermann Leibold
Manager: (German Empire) Arthur Beier

VIKTORIA BERLIN
(German Empire) Paul Scranowitz
(German Empire) Helmut Röpnack
(German Empire) Willi Hahn
(German Empire) Paul Fischer
(German Empire) Willi Moeck
(German Empire) Willi Knesebeck
(German Empire) Paul Hunder
(German Empire) Otto Dumke
(German Empire) Reinhold Bock
(German Empire) Willy Worpitzky
(German Empire) Alfred Gelbhaar
Manager:
