= 1907 German football championship =

1907 German championship
Deutsche Fußballmeisterschaft
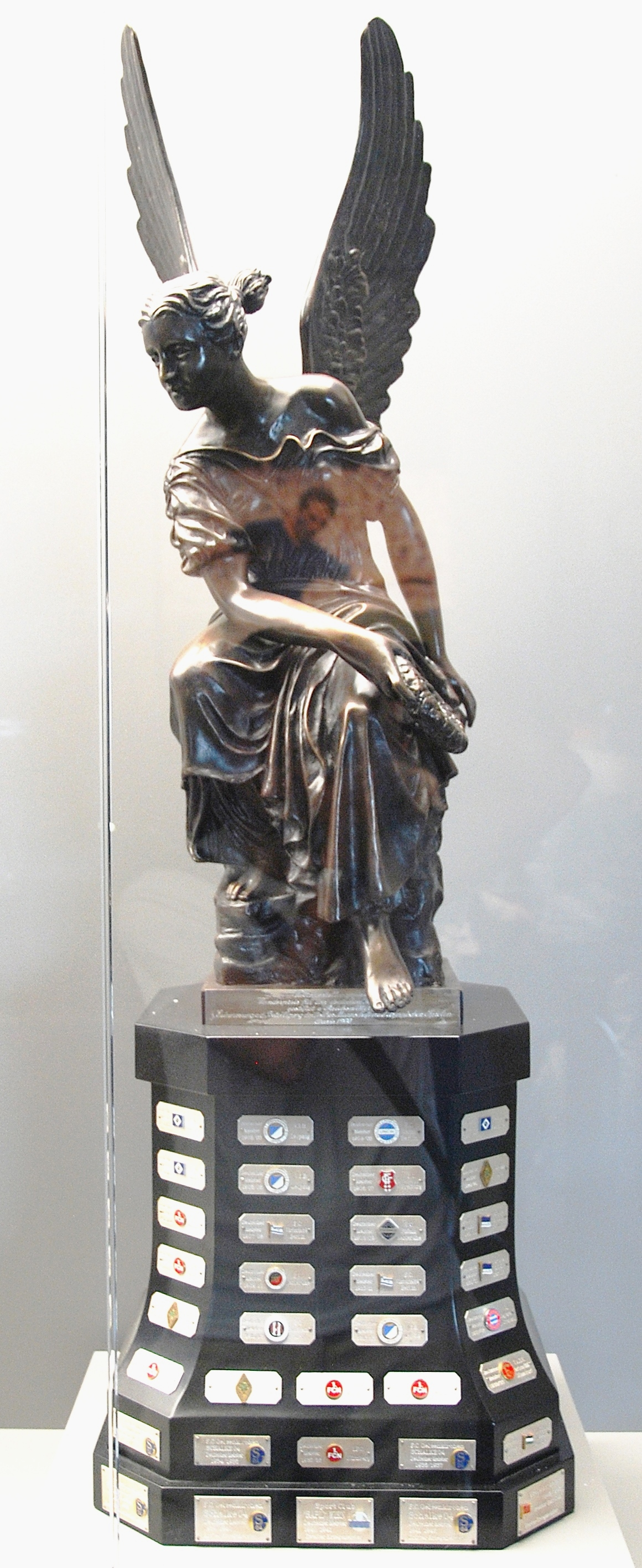
- Replica of the Viktoria trophy

Tournament details
- Country: Germany
- Dates: 21 April – 19 May
- Teams: 6

Final positions
- Champions: Freiburger FC; 1st German title
- Runner-up: Viktoria 89 Berlin

Tournament statistics
- Matches played: 5
- Goals scored: 26 (5.2 per match)
- Top goal scorer(s): Philipp Burkart; Helmut Röpnack (4 goals each)

The 1907 German football championship was the fifth season in which teams competed for the national championship title. Six teams qualified to reach the final stages of the competition, and the winners were Freiburger FC, defeating Viktoria 89 Berlin 3–1 in the final.

For Freiburger FC it was the sole appearance in the German championship final. Viktoria 89 Berlin made its first of four final appearances in 1907, going on to win the 1908 and 1911 championships as well as losing the 1909 final in between.

Viktoria's Helmut Röpnack and Freiburg's Phillip Burkart were the top scorers of the 1907 championship with four goals each.

Six clubs qualified for the competition played in knock-out format, the champions of each of the six regional football championships.

== Qualified teams ==
The teams qualified through the regional championships:

Qualified team	Qualified from
Schlesien Breslau	South Eastern German champions
Viktoria 89 Berlin	VBB champions
VfB Leipzig	Central German champions
FC Victoria Hamburg	Northern German champions
Düsseldorfer FC 99	Western German champions
Freiburger FC	Southern German champions

== Competition ==
=== Quarter-finals ===
The preliminary round, played on 21 April 1907:

Team 1	Score	Team 2
Viktoria 89 Berlin	2–1	Schlesien Breslau
SC Victoria Hamburg	8–1	Düsseldorfer FC 99

=== Semi-finals ===
9 May 1907

SC Victoria Hamburg	1 – 4	Viktoria 89 Berlin
Klinkrad 40'		Dumke 10'; Röpnack 19', 65'; Reinke 90'

HFC 1888-Platz, Hamburg
Referee: Hinze

12 May 1907

Freiburger FC	3 – 2	VfB Leipzig
Burkart; Mayer		Steinbeck; Richter

Club-Stadion an der Ziegelgasse, Nuremberg
Attendance: 1,100
Referee: Müller

=== Final ===
19 May 1907

Freiburger FC	3 – 1	Viktoria 89 Berlin
Glaser 30' (pen.); Burkart 57', 80'	Report	Röpnack 43' (pen.)

Stadion am Kanal, Frankenthal
Attendance: 3,000
Referee: Eikhof

FREIBURGER FC
(Hungary) Paul Gilly-Goldberger
(German Empire) August Falschlunger
(German Empire) L. C. de Villiers
(German Empire) Max Mayer
(German Empire) Felix Hunn
(German Empire) Josef Glaser
(German Empire) Fritz Bodenweber
(Switzerland) Henri Sydler
(German Empire) Hofherr
(German Empire) Max Haase
(German Empire) Philipp Burkart
Manager:

VIKTORIA BERLIN
(German Empire) Paul Scranowitz
(German Empire) Helmut Röpnack
(German Empire) Willi Hahn
(German Empire) Paul Fischer
(German Empire) Willi Knesebeck
(German Empire) Paul Hunder
(German Empire) Adolf Deni
(German Empire) Emil Reinke
(German Empire) Paul Kralle
(German Empire) Otto Dumke
(German Empire) Reinhold Bock
Manager:
