= List of football clubs in Germany by major honours won =

This is a list of football clubs in Germany by major honours won. It lists every German football club to have won any of the two major domestic trophies in Germany (or West Germany), three major European competitions or the global competitions FIFA has recognised. East German championships are not counted in these tables.

== Germany's most successful clubs ==
=== Key ===
Domestic competitions

- BL = Bundesliga (1963– )
- GC<'63 = German champion before 1963 (1903–1963)
- Cup = DFB-Pokal (1952– ), Tschammerpokal (1935–1943)
- LP = DFL-Ligapokal (2005–2007), DFB-Ligapokal (1972–73, 1997–2004)
- SC = DFL-Supercup (2010– ), DFB-Supercup (1987–1996)

European competitions

- UCL = UEFA Champions League (1992– ), European Champion Clubs' Cup (1955–1992)
- UEL = UEFA Europa League (2009– ), UEFA Cup (1971–2009)
- UECL = UEFA Conference League (2021– )
- USC = UEFA Super Cup (1972– )
- UCWC = UEFA Cup Winners' Cup (1960–1999)
- UIC = UEFA Intertoto Cup (1995-2008)

Worldwide competitions

- FCWC = FIFA Club World Cup (2000– ),
- IC = Intercontinental Cup (1960–2004)

=== Ranking ===
As of 22 August 2026

| Rank | Club | Domestic trophies | | | | | | Continental trophies | | | | | | | Worldwide trophies | | | Honours | |
| Rank | Club | BL | GC<'63 | Cup | LP | SC | Total | UCL | UEL | UECL | USC | UCWC | UIC | Total | FCWC | IC | Total | Total | Last trophy |
|---|---|---|---|---|---|---|---|---|---|---|---|---|---|---|---|---|---|---|---|
| 1 | Bayern Munich | 34 | 1 | 21 | 6 | 12 | 74 | 6 | 1 | — | 2 | 1 | — | 10 | 2 | 2 | 4 | 88 | 2026 DFL-Supercup |
| 2 | Borussia Dortmund | 5 | 3 | 5 | — | 6 | 19 | 1 | — | — | — | 1 | — | 2 | — | 1 | 1 | 22 | 2020–21 DFB-Pokal |
| 3 | Schalke 04 | — | 7 | 5 | 1 | 1 | 14 | — | 1 | — | — | — | 2 | 3 | — | — | 0 | 17 | 2011 DFL-Supercup |
| 4 | Werder Bremen | 4 | — | 6 | 1 | 3 | 14 | — | — | — | — | 1 | 1 | 2 | — | — | 0 | 16 | 2008–09 DFB-Pokal |
| 5 | Hamburger SV | 3 | 3 | 3 | 2 | — | 11 | 1 | — | — | — | 1 | 2 | 4 | — | — | 0 | 15 | 2003 DFB-Ligapokal |
| 6 | 1. FC Nürnberg | 1 | 8 | 4 | — | — | 13 | — | — | — | — | — | — | 0 | — | — | 0 | 13 | 2006–07 DFB-Pokal |
| 7 | VfB Stuttgart | 3 | 2 | 4 | — | 1 | 10 | — | — | — | — | — | 2 | 2 | — | — | 0 | 12 | 2024–25 DFB-Pokal |
| 8 | Borussia Mönchengladbach | 5 | — | 3 | — | — | 8 | — | 2 | — | — | — | — | 2 | — | — | 0 | 10 | 1994–95 DFB-Pokal |
| 9 | Eintracht Frankfurt | — | 1 | 5 | — | — | 6 | — | 2 | — | — | — | — | 2 | — | — | 0 | 8 | 2021–22 UEFA Europa League |
| 10 | 1. FC Kaiserslautern | 2 | 2 | 2 | — | 1 | 7 | — | — | — | — | — | — | 0 | — | — | 0 | 7 | 1997–98 Bundesliga |
| 10 | 1. FC Köln | 2 | 1 | 4 | — | — | 7 | — | — | — | — | — | — | 0 | — | — | 0 | 7 | 1982–83 DFB-Pokal |
| 12 | Bayer Leverkusen | 1 | — | 2 | — | 1 | 4 | — | 1 | — | — | — | — | 1 | — | — | 0 | 5 | 2024 DFL-Supercup |
| 13 | Hertha BSC | — | 2 | — | 2 | — | 4 | — | — | — | — | — | — | 0 | — | — | 0 | 4 | 2002 DFB-Ligapokal |
| 13 | Dresdner SC (Note: Original club went defunct, with a new club being recognised as the successor.) | — | 2 | 2 | — | — | 4 | — | — | — | — | — | — | 0 | — | — | 0 | 4 | 1944 German championship |
| 13 | 1. FC Lokomotive Leipzig | — | 3 | 1 | — | — | 4 | — | — | — | — | — | — | 0 | — | — | 0 | 4 | 1936 Tschammerpokal |
| 13 | Karlsruher SC | — | 1 | 2 | — | — | 3 | — | — | — | — | — | 1 | 1 | — | — | 0 | 4 | 1955–56 DFB-Pokal |
| 17 | RB Leipzig | — | — | 2 | — | 1 | 3 | — | — | — | — | — | — | 0 | — | — | 0 | 3 | 2023 DFL-Supercup |
| 17 | VfL Wolfsburg | 1 | — | 1 | — | 1 | 3 | — | — | — | — | — | — | 0 | — | — | 0 | 3 | 2015 DFL-Supercup |
| 17 | Hannover 96 | — | 2 | 1 | — | — | 3 | — | — | — | — | — | — | 0 | — | — | 0 | 3 | 1991–92 DFB-Pokal |
| 17 | Fortuna Düsseldorf | — | 1 | 2 | — | — | 3 | — | — | — | — | — | — | 0 | — | — | 0 | 3 | 1979–80 DFB-Pokal |
| 17 | 1860 Munich | 1 | — | 2 | — | — | 3 | — | — | — | — | — | — | 0 | — | — | 0 | 3 | 1965–66 Bundesliga |
| 17 | Greuther Fürth | — | 3 | — | — | — | 3 | — | — | — | — | — | — | 0 | — | — | 0 | 3 | 1929 German championship |
| 23 | Rot-Weiss Essen | — | 1 | 1 | — | — | 2 | — | — | — | — | — | — | 0 | — | — | 0 | 2 | 1955 German championship |
| 23 | Rapid Wien (Note: Austria was part of Germany when the club won the trophy.) | — | 1 | 1 | — | — | 2 | — | — | — | — | — | — | 0 | — | — | 0 | 2 | 1941 German championship |
| 23 | BFC Viktoria 1889 (Note: Club is now defunct.) | — | 2 | — | — | — | 2 | — | — | — | — | — | — | 0 | — | — | 0 | 2 | 1911 German championship |
| 26 | KFC Uerdingen 05 | — | — | 1 | — | — | 1 | — | — | — | — | — | — | 0 | — | — | 0 | 1 | 1984–85 DFB-Pokal |
| 26 | 1. FC Magdeburg (Note: Club played in the DDR-Oberliga when it won the Cup Winners' Cup.) | — | — | — | — | — | 0 | — | — | — | — | 1 | — | 1 | — | — | 0 | 1 | 1973–74 Cup Winners' Cup |
| 26 | Kickers Offenbach | — | — | 1 | — | — | 1 | — | — | — | — | — | — | 0 | — | — | 0 | 1 | 1969–70 DFB-Pokal |
| 26 | Eintracht Braunschweig | 1 | — | — | — | — | 1 | — | — | — | — | — | — | 0 | — | — | 0 | 1 | 1966–67 Bundesliga |
| 26 | Schwarz-Weiß Essen | — | — | 1 | — | — | 1 | — | — | — | — | — | — | 0 | — | — | 0 | 1 | 1958–59 DFB-Pokal |
| 26 | VfR Mannheim | — | 1 | — | — | — | 1 | — | — | — | — | — | — | 0 | — | — | 0 | 1 | 1949 German championship |
| 26 | First Vienna FC | — | — | 1 | — | — | 1 | — | — | — | — | — | — | 0 | — | — | 0 | 1 | 1943 Tschammerpokal |
| 26 | Holstein Kiel | — | 1 | — | — | — | 1 | — | — | — | — | — | — | 0 | — | — | 0 | 1 | 1912 German championship |
| 26 | Karlsruher FV | — | 1 | — | — | — | 1 | — | — | — | — | — | — | 0 | — | — | 0 | 1 | 1910 German championship |
| 26 | Freiburger FC | — | 1 | — | — | — | 1 | — | — | — | — | — | — | 0 | — | — | 0 | 1 | 1907 German championship |
| 26 | Union 92 Berlin | — | 1 | — | — | — | 1 | — | — | — | — | — | — | 0 | — | — | 0 | 1 | 1905 German championship |
| Total | | 56 | 51 | 76 | 12 | 20 | 215 | 8 | 7 | 0 | 2 | 5 | 8 | 30 | 2 | 3 | 5 | 250 | |

== East Germany's most successful clubs ==
| Club | Domestic Titles | | | | International Titles | Overall titles |
| Club | DDR-Oberliga | FDGB-Pokal | DFV-Supercup | Total | UEFA Cup Winners' Cup | Overall titles |
|---|---|---|---|---|---|---|
| Dynamo Dresden | 8 | 7 | - | 15 | - | 15 |
| BFC Dynamo | 10 | 3 | 1 | 14 | - | 14 |
| 1. FC Magdeburg | 3 | 7 | - | 10 | 1 | 11 |
| 1. FC Frankfurt | 6 | 2 | - | 8 | - | 8 |
| Carl Zeiss Jena | 3 | 4 | - | 7 | - | 7 |
| FSV Zwickau | 2 | 3 | - | 5 | - | 5 |
| Erzgebirge Aue | 3 | 1 | - | 4 | - | 4 |
| Chemie Leipzig | 2 | 2 | - | 4 | - | 4 |
| 1. FC Lokomotive Leipzig | - | 4 | - | 4 | - | 4 |
| Rot-Weiß Erfurt | 2 | - | - | 2 | - | 2 |
| Turbine Halle | 2 | - | - | 2 | - | 2 |
| Hansa Rostock | 1 | 1 | - | 2 | - | 2 |
| Hallescher FC | - | 2 | - | 2 | - | 2 |
| Chemnitzer FC | 1 | - | - | 1 | - | 1 |
| 1. FC Union Berlin | - | 1 | - | 1 | - | 1 |
| Dessau 05 | - | 1 | - | 1 | - | 1 |
| Dresdner SC | - | 1 | - | 1 | - | 1 |
| Stahl Thale | - | 1 | - | 1 | - | 1 |

== Saarland's most successful clubs ==
| Club | Ehrenliga Saarland | |
|---|---|---|
| Club | 1. FC Saarbrücken | 1 |
| Borussia Neunkirchen | 1 | |
| 05 Saarbrücken | 1 | |

== Combined total ==
=== Key ===
Domestic competitions

- L = German champions (1903–2026) & DDR-Oberliga (1948–1991) & Ehrenliga Saarland (1948–1951)
- C = DFB-Pokal & FDGB-Pokal
- LC = DFL-Ligapokal
- SC = Franz Beckenbauer Supercup & DFV-Supercup

European competitions

- UCL = UEFA Champions League
- UCWC = UEFA Cup Winners' Cup
- UEL = UEFA Europa League
- USC = UEFA Super Cup
- UIC = UEFA Intertoto Cup

Worldwide competitions

- FCWC = FIFA Club World Cup
- IC = Intercontinental Cup

=== Ranking ===
As of August 2026

| Club | Domestic Titles | | | | | Continental Titles | | | | | | Intercontinental Titles | | | Overall titles |
| Club | L | C | LC | SC | Total | UCL | UCWC | UEL | USC | UIC | Total | FCWC | IC | Total | Overall titles |
|---|---|---|---|---|---|---|---|---|---|---|---|---|---|---|---|
| Bayern Munich | 35 | 21 | 6 | 12 | 74 | 6 | 1 | 1 | 2 | - | 10 | 2 | 2 | 4 | 88 |
| Borussia Dortmund | 8 | 5 | - | 6 | 19 | 1 | 1 | - | - | - | 2 | - | 1 | 1 | 22 |
| Schalke 04 | 7 | 5 | 1 | 1 | 14 | - | - | 1 | - | 2 | 3 | - | - | - | 17 |
| Werder Bremen | 4 | 6 | 1 | 3 | 14 | - | 1 | - | - | 1 | 2 | - | - | - | 16 |
| Hamburger SV | 6 | 3 | 2 | - | 11 | 1 | 1 | - | - | 2 | 4 | - | - | - | 15 |
| Dynamo Dresden | 8 | 7 | - | - | 15 | - | - | - | - | - | - | - | - | - | 15 |
| BFC Dynamo | 10 | 3 | - | 1 | 14 | - | - | - | - | - | - | - | - | - | 14 |
| 1. FC Nürnberg | 9 | 4 | - | - | 13 | - | - | - | - | - | - | - | - | - | 13 |
| VfB Stuttgart | 5 | 4 | - | 1 | 10 | - | - | - | - | 2 | 2 | - | - | - | 12 |
| 1. FC Magdeburg | 3 | 7 | - | - | 10 | - | 1 | - | - | - | 1 | - | - | - | 11 |
| Borussia Mönchengladbach | 5 | 3 | - | - | 8 | - | - | 2 | - | - | 2 | - | - | - | 10 |
| Eintracht Frankfurt | 1 | 5 | - | - | 6 | - | - | 2 | - | - | 2 | - | - | - | 8 |
| 1. FC Frankfurt | 6 | 2 | - | - | 8 | - | - | - | - | - | - | - | - | - | 8 |
| 1. FC Lokomotive Leipzig | 3 | 5 | - | - | 8 | - | - | - | - | - | - | - | - | - | 8 |
| 1. FC Kaiserslautern | 4 | 2 | - | 1 | 7 | - | - | - | - | - | - | - | - | - | 7 |
| 1. FC Köln | 3 | 4 | - | - | 7 | - | - | - | - | - | - | - | - | - | 7 |
| Carl Zeiss Jena | 3 | 4 | - | - | 7 | - | - | - | - | - | - | - | - | - | 7 |
| Bayer Leverkusen | 1 | 2 | - | 1 | 4 | - | - | 1 | - | - | 1 | - | - | - | 5 |
| Dresdner SC | 2 | 3 | - | - | 5 | - | - | - | - | - | - | - | - | - | 5 |
| FSV Zwickau | 2 | 3 | - | - | 5 | - | - | - | - | - | - | - | - | - | 5 |
| Karlsruher SC | 1 | 2 | - | - | 3 | - | - | - | - | 1 | 1 | - | - | - | 4 |
| Erzgebirge Aue | 3 | 1 | - | - | 4 | - | - | - | - | - | - | - | - | - | 4 |
| Chemie Leipzig | 2 | 2 | - | - | 4 | - | - | - | - | - | - | - | - | - | 4 |
| Hertha BSC | 2 | - | 2 | - | 4 | - | - | - | - | - | - | - | - | - | 4 |
| Greuther Fürth | 3 | - | - | - | 3 | - | - | - | - | - | - | - | - | - | 3 |
| Hannover 96 | 2 | 1 | - | - | 3 | - | - | - | - | - | - | - | - | - | 3 |
| 1860 Munich | 1 | 2 | - | - | 3 | - | - | - | - | - | - | - | - | - | 3 |
| Fortuna Düsseldorf | 1 | 2 | - | - | 3 | - | - | - | - | - | - | - | - | - | 3 |
| VfL Wolfsburg | 1 | 1 | - | 1 | 3 | - | - | - | - | - | - | - | - | - | 3 |
| RB Leipzig | - | 2 | - | 1 | 3 | - | - | - | - | - | - | - | - | - | 3 |
| BFC Viktoria 1889 | 2 | - | - | - | 2 | - | - | - | - | - | - | - | - | - | 2 |
| Rot-Weiß Erfurt | 2 | - | - | - | 2 | - | - | - | - | - | - | - | - | - | 2 |
| Turbine Halle | 2 | - | - | - | 2 | - | - | - | - | - | - | - | - | - | 2 |
| Hansa Rostock | 1 | 1 | - | - | 2 | - | - | - | - | - | - | - | - | - | 2 |
| Rot-Weiss Essen | 1 | 1 | - | - | 2 | - | - | - | - | - | - | - | - | - | 2 |
| Hallescher FC | - | 2 | - | - | 2 | - | - | - | - | - | - | - | - | - | 2 |
| 1. FC Saarbrücken | 1 | - | - | - | 1 | - | - | - | - | - | - | - | - | - | 1 |
| Blau-Weiß 1890 Berlin | 1 | - | - | - | 1 | - | - | - | - | - | - | - | - | - | 1 |
| Borussia Neunkirchen | 1 | - | - | - | 1 | - | - | - | - | - | - | - | - | - | 1 |
| Chemnitzer FC | 1 | - | - | - | 1 | - | - | - | - | - | - | - | - | - | 1 |
| Eintracht Braunschweig | 1 | - | - | - | 1 | - | - | - | - | - | - | - | - | - | 1 |
| Freiburger FC | 1 | - | - | - | 1 | - | - | - | - | - | - | - | - | - | 1 |
| Holstein Kiel | 1 | - | - | - | 1 | - | - | - | - | - | - | - | - | - | 1 |
| Karlsruher FV | 1 | - | - | - | 1 | - | - | - | - | - | - | - | - | - | 1 |
| Sportfreunde 05 Saarbrücken | 1 | - | - | - | 1 | - | - | - | - | - | - | - | - | - | 1 |
| VfR Mannheim | 1 | - | - | - | 1 | - | - | - | - | - | - | - | - | - | 1 |
| 1. FC Union Berlin | - | 1 | - | - | 1 | - | - | - | - | - | - | - | - | - | 1 |
| Dessau 05 | - | 1 | - | - | 1 | - | - | - | - | - | - | - | - | - | 1 |
| Kickers Offenbach | - | 1 | - | - | 1 | - | - | - | - | - | - | - | - | - | 1 |
| Stahl Thale | - | 1 | - | - | 1 | - | - | - | - | - | - | - | - | - | 1 |
| Schwarz-Weiß Essen | - | 1 | - | - | 1 | - | - | - | - | - | - | - | - | - | 1 |
| Uerdingen 05 | - | 1 | - | - | 1 | - | - | - | - | - | - | - | - | - | 1 |

== See also ==
- List of football clubs by competitive honours won
- Football in Germany
- List of football clubs in Germany
- German Football Association
- Association football
