= List of SV Werder Bremen seasons =

This is a list of the seasons played by Werder Bremen from 1900 when the club was represented at the founding of the German Football Association (DFB) at Leipzig to the most recent seasons. The club's achievements in all major national and international competitions as well as the top scorers are listed. Players with a bold and coloured background were also top scorers of whichever division Werder were in during that season. The list is separated into three parts, coinciding with the three major episodes of German football:

- Before 1945 the German league structure was changing rapidly. The end of World War II marks the end of this episode.
- From 1945–1963 a German league structure without a nationwide league was maintained without greater changes.
- Since 1963 a nationwide league, the Bundesliga, exists.

Werder have won the Bundesliga four times. The club have also won the DFB-Pokal six times, and have won one European title, the Cup Winner's Cup in 1992.

Bremen have been relegated twice, in 1979–80 and 2020–21; on both occasions, they were promoted back to the first tier at the first attempt.

== Key ==
Key to league record:

- Pld – Matches played
- W – Matches won
- D – Matches drawn
- L – Matches lost
- GF – Goals for
- GA – Goals against
- Pts – Points
- Pos – Final position

Key to colours and symbols:
Symbol	Meaning
W	Winners
RU	Runners-up
↑	Promoted
↓	Relegated
EC	European Cup / Champions League
EC	UEFA Cup / Europa League
♦	Top league scorer in Werder Bremen's division

Key to rounds:

- Prel. – Preliminary round
- QR1 – First qualifying round
- QR2 – Second qualifying round, etc.
- Inter – Intermediate round (between qualifying rounds and rounds proper)
- GS – Group stage
- 1R – First round
- 2R – Second round, etc.
- R64 – 1/32 Final
- R32 – 1/16 Final
- R16 – 1/8 Final
- QF – Quarter-finals
- SF – Semi-finals
- F – Final
- W – Winners
- DNE – Did not enter
- BL – Bundesliga
- 2BL – 2. Bundesliga
- NDFM – Norddeutsche Fußballmeisterschaft

== Seasons until 1933 ==
Results of league and cup competitions by season
Season	Division	Pld	W	D	L	GF	GA	Pts	Pos	Player(s)	Goals
Season	League									Top goalscorer(s)	
1902–03	Verband Bremer Fußball-Vereine	-	-	-	-	-	-	-	1st	N/A	-
1903–04	Verband Bremer Fußball-Vereine	-	-	-	-	-	-	-	-	N/A	-
1904–05	Verband Bremer Fußball-Vereine	-	-	-	-	-	-	-	-	N/A	-
1905–06	Verband Bremer Fußball-Vereine	-	-	-	-	-	-	-	1st	N/A	-
1906–07	Verband Bremer Fußball-Vereine	-	-	-	-	-	-	-	-	N/A	-
1907–08	NDFM Bezirk Bremen	-	-	-	-	-	-	-	-	N/A	-
1908–09	NDFM Bezirk Bremen	-	-	-	-	-	-	-	-	N/A	-
1909–10	NDFM Bezirk Bremen	-	-	-	-	-	-	-	1st	N/A	-
1910–11	NDFM Bezirk Bremen	-	-	-	-	-	-	-	-	N/A	-
1911–12	NDFM Bezirk Bremen	-	-	-	-	-	-	-	-	N/A	-
1912–13	NDFM Bezirk Bremen	-	-	-	-	-	-	-	-	N/A	-
1913–14	Northern German football championship	18	1	0	17	12	66	2	10th	N/A	-
1914–15	World War I										
1915–16	World War I										
1916–17	World War I										
1917–18	World War I										
1918–19	World War I										
1919–20	NDFM Bezirk Bremen	-	-	-	-	-	-	-	-	N/A	-
1920–21	NDFM Südkreisliga	18	9	2	7	61	35	20	4th	N/A	-
1921–22	NDFM Westkreisliga	14	4	3	7	16	24	11	7th	N/A	-
1922–23	NDFM Westkreis Staffel Jade	12	-	-	-	26	6	18	1st	N/A	-
1923–24	NDFM Westkreis Staffel Weser	12	4	2	6	21	29	10	5th	N/A	-
1924–25	NDFM Westkreis Staffel Weser	12	8	1	3	46	23	17	2nd	N/A	-
1925–26	NDFM Westkreis Staffel Weser	12	12	0	0	53	16	24	1st	N/A	-
1926–27	NDFM Westkreis Staffel Weser	12	9	0	3	66	31	18	1st	N/A	-
1927–28	NDFM Westkreis Staffel Jade	16	13	0	3	70	23	26	1st	N/A	-
1928–29	NDFM Westkreis Staffel Jade	-	-	-	-	-	-	-	1st	N/A	-
1929–30	NDFM Westkreis Staffel Weser/Jade	14	6	1	7	35	35	13	4th	N/A	-
1930–31	NDFM Westkreis Staffel Weser/Jade	14	8	2	4	41	21	18	2nd	N/A	-
1931–32	NDFM Westkreis Staffel Weser/Jade	14	6	2	6	25	37	14	4th	N/A	-
1932–33	NDFM Westkreis Staffel Weser/Jade	14	10	1	3	43	11	21	2nd	N/A	-
1934–35	NDFM Westkreis Staffel Weser/Jade	20	10	9	1	57	23	29	2nd	N/A	-
1935–36	NDFM Westkreis Staffel Weser/Jade	20	13	3	4	44	22	29			

== Gauliga (1933–1945) ==
Results of league and cup competitions by season
Season	Division	Pld	W	D	L	GF	GA	Pts	Pos	DFB-Pokal	Player(s)	Goals
Season	League									DFB-Pokal	Top goalscorer(s)	
1933–34	Gauliga Niedersachsen	18	12	3	3	67	31	27	1st	Not played	N/A	-
1934–35	Gauliga Niedersachsen	20	10	9	1	57	23	29	2nd	Not played	N/A	-
1935–36	Gauliga Niedersachsen	20	13	3	4	44	22	29	1st	1R	N/A	-
1936–37	Gauliga Niedersachsen	18	14	2	2	73	31	30	1st	QF	N/A	-
1937–38	Gauliga Niedersachsen	18	12	3	3	70	32	27	3rd	R32	N/A	-
1938–39	Gauliga Niedersachsen	18	10	5	3	32	20	25	4th	DNE	N/A	-
1939–40	Gauliga Niedersachsen Gruppe Nord	10	5	1	4	17	11	11	2nd	DNE	N/A	-
1940–41	Gauliga Niedersachsen Gruppe Nord	10	5	2	3	31	15	12	2nd	R32	N/A	-
1941–42	Gauliga Niedersachsen Gruppe Nord Gauliga Niedersachsen Final	10 10	6 10	4 0	0 0	43 36	13 7	16 20	1st 1st	R32	N/A	-
1942–43	Gauliga Weser-Ems	18	15	1	2	107	22	31	2nd	SF	N/A	-
1943–44	Gauliga Weser-Ems Gruppe Bremen	14	7	0	7	44	23	14	4th	DNE	N/A	-
1944–45	World War II											

== 1945–1963 ==
Results of league and cup competitions by season
Season	Division	Pld	W	D	L	GF	GA	Pts	Pos	DFB-Pokal	Cup	Result	Name(s)	Goals
Season	League									DFB-Pokal	UEFA – FIFA		Top goalscorer(s)	
1945–46	World War II													
1946–47	World War II													
1947–48	Oberliga Nord	22	12	2	8	43	38	26	4th	Not played			Horst Gernhardt	13
1948–49	Oberliga Nord	22	8	3	11	49	50	19	8th	Not played			Heinz Rath	15
1949–50	Oberliga Nord	30	16	4	10	78	44	36	4th	Not played			Hans Hagenacker	25
1950–51	Oberliga Nord	32	15	6	11	79	59	36	6th	Not played			N/A	–
1951–52	Oberliga Nord	30	14	5	11	85	52	33	7th	Not played			Karl-Heinz Preuße	24
1952–53	Oberliga Nord	30	15	7	8	71	55	37	3rd	DNE			N/A	–
1953–54	Oberliga Nord	30	13	5	12	53	43	31	5th	DNE			N/A	–
1954–55	Oberliga Nord	30	15	8	7	68	46	38	3rd	DNE			Karl-Heinz Preuße	21
1955–56	Oberliga Nord	30	14	4	12	74	54	32	6th	DNE			Willi Schröder	27
1956–57	Oberliga Nord	30	14	3	13	65	53	31	5th	DNE			Willi Schröder	18
1957–58	Oberliga Nord	30	14	3	13	76	70	31	7th	DNE			Willi Schröder	20
1958–59	Oberliga Nord	30	19	4	7	89	57	42	2nd	DNE			Arnold Schütz	29
1959–60	Oberliga Nord	30	18	4	7	71	47	41	2nd	DNE			Willi Schröder	20
1960–61	Oberliga Nord	30	19	5	6	73	47	43	2nd	W			Arnold Schütz	28
1961–62	Oberliga Nord	30	18	8	4	87	33	44	2nd	DNE	CWC	QF	Horst Barth	9
1962–63	Oberliga Nord	30	22	5	3	102	44	49	2nd	SF			Dieter Meyer ♦	40

== Since 1963 (foundation of Bundesliga) ==
Results of league and cup competitions by season
Season	Division	Pld	W	D	L	GF	GA	Pts	Pos	DFB-Pokal	DFL-Supercup	Cup	Result	Player(s)	Goals
Season	League									DFB-Pokal	DFL-Supercup	UEFA – FIFA		Top goalscorer(s)	
1963–64	Bundesliga	30	10	8	12	53	62	28	10th	R32				Arnold Schütz	11
1964–65	Bundesliga	30	15	11	4	54	29	41	W	R32				Klaus Matischak	12
1965–66	Bundesliga	34	21	3	10	76	40	45	4th	QF		EC	R16	Arnold Schütz	23
1966–67	Bundesliga	34	10	9	15	49	56	29	16th	R16				Arnold Schütz Gerhard Zebrowski	9
1967–68	Bundesliga	34	18	8	8	68	51	44	2nd	R32				Werner Görts	17
1968–69	Bundesliga	34	14	6	14	59	59	34	9th	QF				Werner Görts	19
1969–70	Bundesliga	34	10	11	13	38	47	31	11th	R16				Werner Görts	9
1970–71	Bundesliga	34	11	11	12	41	40	33	10th	R32				Arnold Schütz	6
1971–72	Bundesliga	34	11	9	14	63	58	31	11th	SF				Werner Weist	18
1972–73	Bundesliga	34	12	7	15	50	52	31	11th	SF				Werner Weist	16
1973–74	Bundesliga	34	9	13	12	48	56	31	11th	R16				Werner Weist	9
1974–75	Bundesliga	34	9	7	18	45	69	25	15th	QF				Werner Weist	13
1975–76	Bundesliga	34	11	8	15	44	55	30	13th	R128				Jurgen Rober	10
1976–77	Bundesliga	34	13	7	14	51	59	33	11th	R16				Jurgen Rober	13
1977–78	Bundesliga	34	13	5	16	48	57	31	15th	SF				Jurgen Rober	14
1978–79	Bundesliga	34	10	11	13	48	60	31	11th	R64				Jurgen Rober	13
1979–80	Bundesliga	34	11	3	20	52	93	25	17th ↓	R64				Werner Dreßel	12
1980–81	2. Bundesliga Nord	42	30	8	4	97	33	68	1st ↑	R16				Erwin Kostedde	33
1981–82	Bundesliga	34	17	8	9	61	52	42	5th	QF				Uwe Reinders	21
1982–83	Bundesliga	34	23	6	5	76	38	52	2nd	R32		UC	R16	Rudi Völler ♦	30
1983–84	Bundesliga	34	19	7	8	79	46	45	5th	SF		UC	R32	Rudi Völler	20
1984–85	Bundesliga	34	18	10	8	87	51	46	2nd	QF		UC	R64	Rudi Völler	26
1985–86	Bundesliga	34	20	9	5	83	41	49	2nd	R16		UC	R64	Frank Neubarth	24
1986–87	Bundesliga	34	17	6	11	65	54	40	5th	R64		UC	R64	Rudi Völler	22
1987–88	Bundesliga	34	22	8	4	61	22	52	W	SF		UC	SF	Karl-Heinz Riedle	24
1988–89	Bundesliga	34	18	8	8	55	32	46	3rd	RU	W	EC	QF	Karl-Heinz Riedle	21
1989–90	Bundesliga	34	10	14	10	49	41	34	7th	RU		UC	SF	Wynton Rufer	19
1990–91	Bundesliga	34	14	14	6	46	29	42	3rd	W				Wynton Rufer	19
1991–92	Bundesliga	34	11	16	11	44	45	38	9th	SF	RU	CWC	W	Marco Bode Stefan Kohn	15
1992–93	Bundesliga	34	19	10	5	63	30	48	W	QF		USC CWC	RU R16	Wynton Rufer	27
1993–94	Bundesliga	34	13	10	11	51	44	36	8th	W	W	UCL	GS	Wynton Rufer	24
1994–95	Bundesliga	34	20	8	6	70	39	48	2nd	R64	RU	CWC	R16	Mario Basler ♦	22
1995–96	Bundesliga	34	10	14	10	39	42	44	9th	R16		UC	R16	Mario Basler	15
1996–97	Bundesliga	34	14	6	14	53	52	48	8th	R16				Andreas Herzog	16
1997–98	Bundesliga	34	14	8	12	43	47	50	7th	R32				Marco Bode	9
1998–99	Bundesliga	34	10	8	16	41	47	38	13th	W		UC	R32	Marco Bode	9
1999–2000	Bundesliga	34	13	8	13	65	52	47	9th	RU		UC	QF	Marco Bode	18
2000–01	Bundesliga	34	15	8	11	53	48	53	7th	R32		UC	R32	Claudio Pizarro	23
2001–02	Bundesliga	34	17	5	12	54	43	56	6th	R32				Ailton	18
2002–03	Bundesliga	34	16	4	14	51	50	52	6th	SF		UC	2R	Ailton	17
2003–04	Bundesliga	34	22	8	4	79	38	74	W	W				Ailton ♦	34
2004–05	Bundesliga	34	18	5	11	68	37	59	3rd	SF		UCL	R16	Ivan Klasnić	19
2005–06	Bundesliga	34	21	7	9	79	37	70	2nd	QF		UCL	R16	Miroslav Klose ♦	31
2006–07	Bundesliga	34	20	6	8	76	40	66	3rd	R64		UCL UC	GS SF	Diego Miroslav Klose	15
2007–08	Bundesliga	34	20	6	8	75	45	66	2nd	R16		UCL UC	GS R16	Diego	18
2008–09	Bundesliga	34	12	9	13	64	50	45	10th	W		UCL UC	GS RU	Claudio Pizarro	28
2009–10	Bundesliga	34	17	10	7	71	40	61	3rd	RU		UEL	R16	Claudio Pizarro	28
2010–11	Bundesliga	34	10	11	13	47	61	41	13th	R32		UCL	GS	Claudio Pizarro	14
2011–12	Bundesliga	34	11	9	14	49	58	42	9th	R64				Claudio Pizarro	18
2012–13	Bundesliga	34	8	10	16	50	66	34	14th	R64				Aaron Hunt Nils Petersen	11
2013–14	Bundesliga	34	10	9	15	42	66	39	12th	R64				Aaron Hunt Nils Petersen	7
2014–15	Bundesliga	34	11	10	13	50	65	43	10th	R16				Franco Di Santo	14
2015–16	Bundesliga	34	10	8	16	50	65	38	13th	SF				Claudio Pizarro	16
2016–17	Bundesliga	34	13	6	15	61	64	45	8th	R64				Max Kruse	15
2017–18	Bundesliga	34	10	12	12	37	40	42	11th	QF				Max Kruse	8
2018–19	Bundesliga	34	14	11	9	58	49	53	8th	SF				Max Kruse	12
2019–20	Bundesliga	34	8	7	19	42	69	31	16th	QF				Milot Rashica	11
2020–21	Bundesliga	34	7	10	17	36	57	31	17th ↓	SF				Josh Sargent	7
2021–22	2. Bundesliga	34	18	9	7	65	43	63	2nd ↑	R1				Marvin Ducksch	20
2022–23	Bundesliga	34	10	6	18	51	64	36	13th	R2				Niclas Füllkrug ♦	16
2023–24	Bundesliga	34	11	9	14	48	54	42	9th	R1				Marvin Ducksch	13
2024–25	Bundesliga	34	14	9	11	54	57	51	8th	QF				Jens Stage	10
2025–26	Bundesliga	34	8	8	18	37	60	32	15th	R1				Jens Stage	10

== Literature ==
- Jankowski/Pistorius/Prüß (2005). Fußball im Norden. Geschichte, Chronik, Namen, Daten, Fakten, Zahlen. Bremen und Barsinghausen.
- Grüber, Walter (2011). Fußball Torjägerstatistik Deutschland. Torschützenlisten 1945-2011. Books on Demand GmbH. ISBN 978-3-8448-6248-5.
- Hirschi. "Hirschis Fussballseiten". www.fussball-historie.de. Archived from the original on 17 January 2009.
- "The Rec.Sport.Soccer Statistics Foundation". RSSSF.
- Kassies, Bert. "UEFA European Cup Football". kassiesa.home.xs4all.nl. Archived from the original on 4 June 2017.
- "UEFA". UEFA.
- "Worldfootball". www.worldfootball.net.
