= 1911 German football championship =

1911 German championship
Deutsche Fußballmeisterschaft
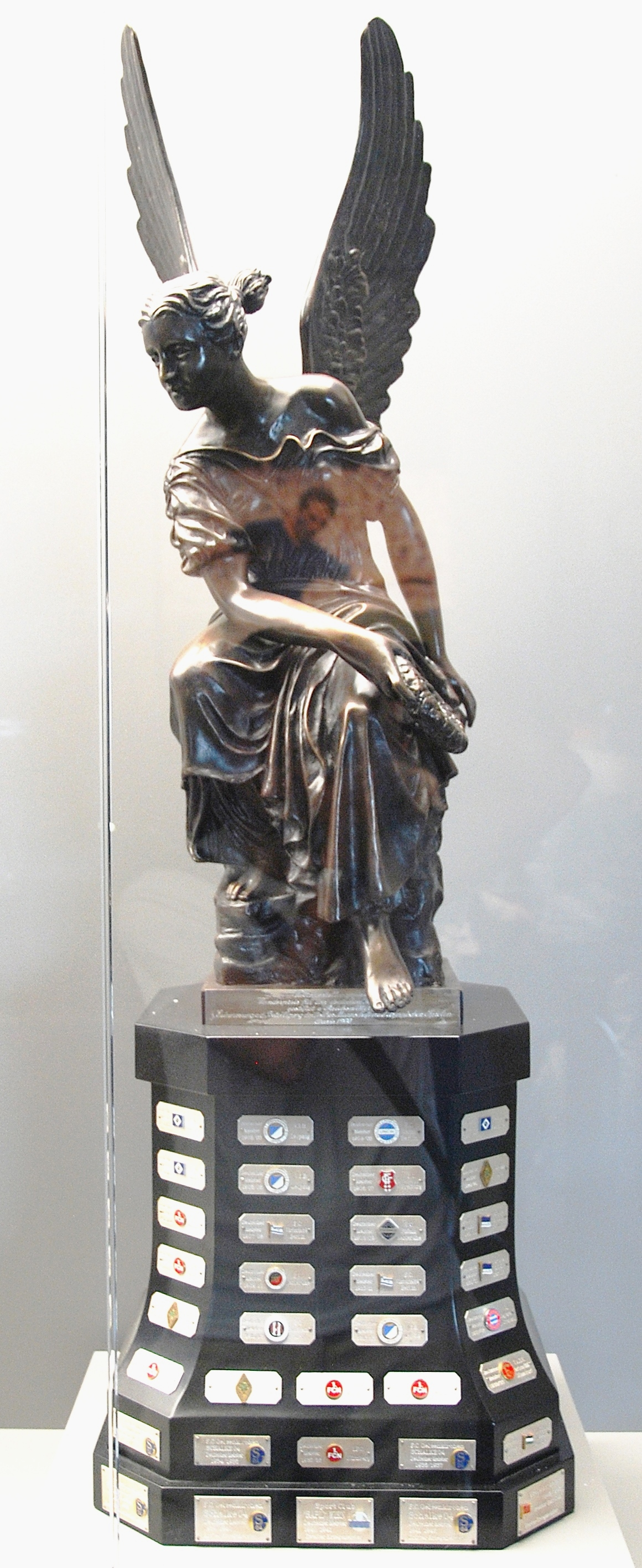
- Replica of the Viktoria trophy

Tournament details
- Country: Germany
- Dates: 7 May – 4 June
- Teams: 8

Final positions
- Champions: Viktoria 89 Berlin; 2nd German title
- Runner-up: VfB Leipzig

Tournament statistics
- Matches played: 6
- Goals scored: 23 (3.83 per match)
- Top goal scorer(s): Willi Worpitzky (4 goals)

The 1911 German football championship, the 9th edition of the competition, was won by Viktoria 89 Berlin, defeating VfB Leipzig 3–1 in the final.

For Viktoria it was the second national championship, having previously won the 1908 edition. Together with two losing finals in 1907 and 1909 it marked the end of the club's most successful era and also equaled VfB Leipzigs record of two championships won. Leipzig, champions in 1903 and 1906 would twice more appear in the final, winning in 1913 and losing in 1914.

Viktoria's Willy Worpitzky was the top scorer of the 1911 championship with four goals.

Eight clubs qualified for the competition played in knock-out format, the champions of each of the eight regional football championships. It was the last season where two rival football associations from Berlin send their champions to the German championship, with the two merging at the end of the season.

== Qualified teams ==
The teams qualified through the regional championships:

Club	Qualified as
Lituania Tilsit	Baltic champions
Askania Forst	South Eastern German champions
Viktoria 89 Berlin	Berlin champions (Verband Berliner Ballspielvereine)
Tasmania Rixdorf	March football champions (Märkischer Fußball-Bund)
VfB Leipzig	Central German champions
Holstein Kiel	Northern German champions
Duisburger SpV	Western German champions
Karlsruher FV	Southern German champions

== Competition ==
=== Quarter-finals ===
The quarter-finals, played on 7 May 1911:

Team 1	Score	Team 2
Holstein Kiel	3–1	Duisburger SpV
Karlsruher FV	4–0	Tasmania Rixdorf
VfB Leipzig	3–2	Askania Forst
Viktoria 89 Berlin	^{‡}	Lituania Tilsit

- ^{‡} Game not played, awarded to Viktoria 89 Berlin.

=== Semi-finals ===
The semi-finals, played on 21 May 1911:

Team 1	Score	Team 2
VfB Leipzig	2–0	Karlsruher FV
Viktoria 89 Berlin	4–0	Holstein Kiel

=== Final ===
4 June 1911

Viktoria 89 Berlin	3 – 1	VfB Leipzig
Worpitzky 42', 88'; Kugler 52'	Report	Riso 82'

Sportplatz an der Hygieneaustellung, Dresden
Attendance: 12,000
Referee: Schröder

VIKTORIA BERLIN
(German Empire) Reinhold Welkisch
(German Empire) Helmut Röpnack
(German Empire) Paul Fischer
(German Empire) Willi Knesebeck
(German Empire) Paul Hunder
(German Empire) Albert Graßmann
(German Empire) Otto Dumke
(German Empire) Willy Worpitzky
(German Empire) Paul Kugler
(German Empire) Robert Krüger
(German Empire) Hermann Gasse
Manager:

VFB LEIPZIG
(German Empire) Johannes Schneider
(German Empire) Heinrich Riso
(German Empire) Lothar Rubin
(German Empire) Curt Hesse
(German Empire) Curt Fischer
(German Empire) Hans Dolge
(German Empire) Willy Völker
(German Empire) Karl Uhle
(German Empire) Camillo Ugi
(German Empire) Adalbert Friedrich
(German Empire) Emil Feiler
Manager:
