= FC Viktoria 1889 Berlin =

German association football club from Berlin

- Full name: Fußball-Club Viktoria 1889 Berlin Lichterfelde-Tempelhof e.V.
- Founded: 6 June 1889; 137 years ago
- Ground: Stadion Lichterfelde
- Capacity: 4,300
- President: Ullrich Brüggemann
- Head coach: Andre Littler
- League: Berlin-Liga (VI)
- 2025–26: NOFV-Oberliga, 16th of 16 (relegated)
- Website: www.viktoria-berlin.de
Home colours	Away colours

Fußball-Club Viktoria 1889 Berlin Lichterfelde-Tempelhof e.V., commonly known as FC Viktoria 1889 Berlin or Viktoria Berlin, is a German association football club based in the locality of Lichterfelde of the borough of Steglitz-Zehlendorf in Berlin. The club was formed on 1 July 2013 from a merger of BFC Viktoria 1889 and Lichterfelder FC. The club has the largest football department in Germany. The club also has 1,600 active members.

== History ==
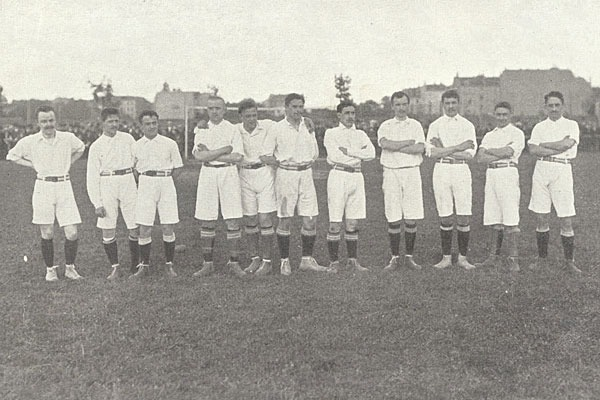
The champion team of Berliner TuFC Viktoria 89 in 1908.

Viktoria 1889 Berlin was formed in a merger of BFC Viktoria 1889 and Lichterfelder FC on 1 July 2013. BFC Viktoria 1889 was one of the oldest football clubs in Germany. It was the dominant club in Berlin in the early 1900s and won the German championship in 1908 and 1911. Lichterfelder FC, on the other hand, was a club which had gone through a number of name changes and mergers before. Lichterfelder FC had a women's team in the Frauen-Regionalliga by the time of the merger.

Viktoria Berlin made its debut in the 2013–14 Regionalliga Nordost, courtesy of a victory for BFC Viktoria 1889 in 2012–13 NOFV-Oberliga. The club won the 2013–14 Berlin Cup and thereby qualified for the first round of the 2014–15 DFB-Pokal. The club was drawn against Bundesliga club Eintracht Frankfurt. Viktoria Berlin lost 2–0 in front of 10,514 spectators at the Friedrich-Ludwig-Jahn-Sportpark.

Viktoria Berlin has the largest football department in Germany. The club had 65 teams with 1,600 members as of 2016. The club qualified for the 3. Liga after a very successful 2020–21 season. The club led 2020–21 Regionalliga Nordost when the Northeastern German Football Association (NOFV) decided to end the season prematurely after eleven rounds played due to the COVID-19 pandemic. The team had won all eleven matches played during the short season.

== Stadium ==
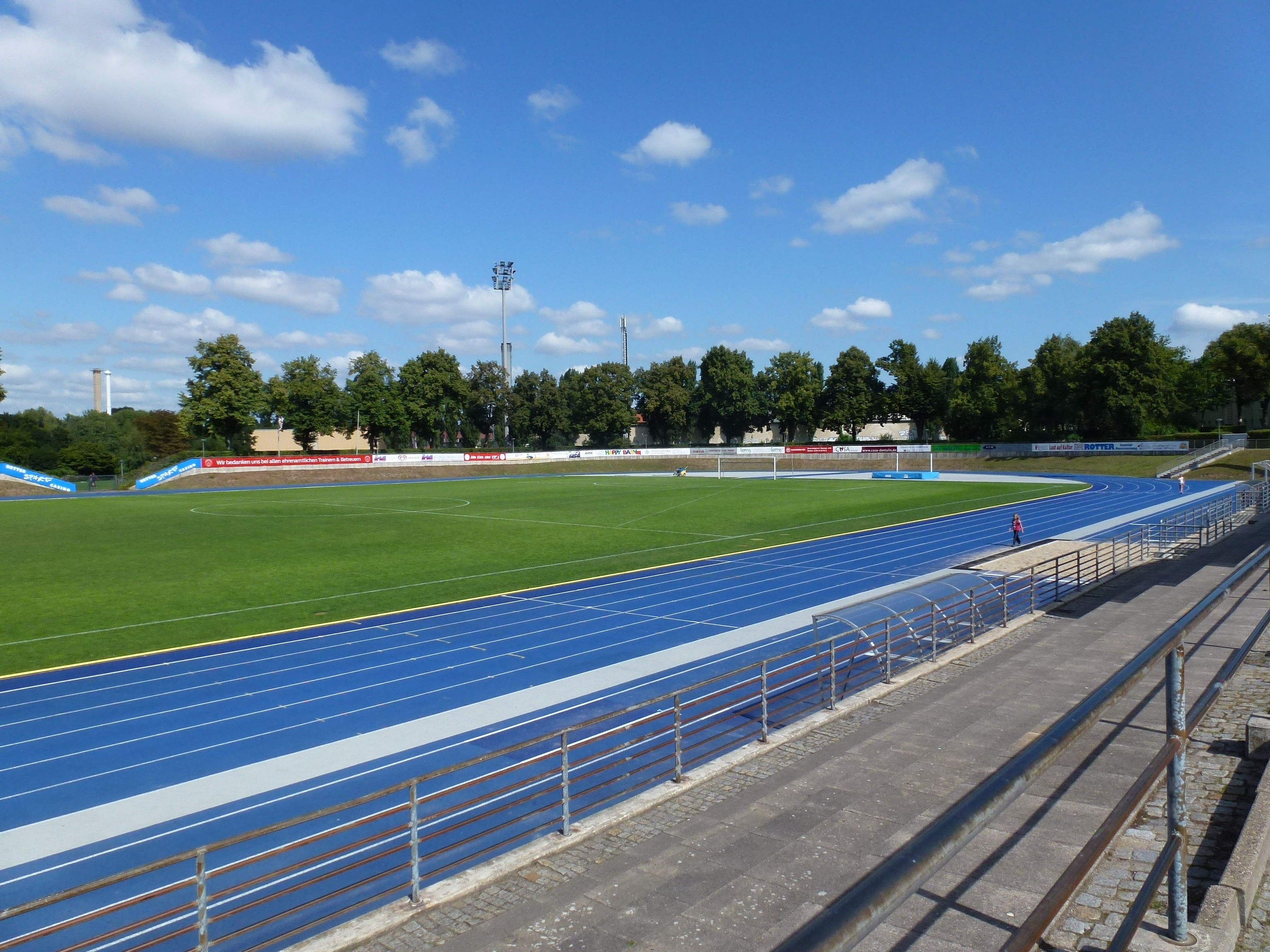
Stadion Lichterfelde in 2012.

The home ground of Viktoria Berlin is the Stadion Lichterfelde. The stadium has a capacity of 4,300 spectators and is also the location of the club offices. The facility also comprises two additional pitches with artificial turf.

The Stadion Lichterfelde was the former home ground of Lichterfelder FC. BFC Viktoria 1889, on the other hand, played its home matches at the Friedrich-Ebert-Stadion in the locality of Tempelhof of the borough of Tempelhof-Schöneberg. The Friedrich-Ebert-Stadion is now used by the U19 team of Viktoria Berlin for its matches in the Under 19 Bundesliga.

The Stadion Lichterfelde currently does not meet the requirements for play in the 3. Liga. Among several requirements, a capacity for 10,000 spectators, underfloor heating and a VIP-area are needed. The stadium can not be easily converted as it is also a protected building of cultural importance. The club had to find a new home ground in order to obtain a license for the 2021-22 3. Liga. Several alternatives were considered, including the Mommsenstadion and the Olympiastadion. The club was finally allowed to play at the Friedrich-Ludwig-Jahn-Sportpark in the locality of Prenzlauer Berg in the borough of Pankow. The operating permit for the Friedrich-Ludwig-Jahn-Stadion originally expired on 31 December 2020 and the complex is awaiting a major redevelopment. But the Department for the Interior and Sports of the Senate of Berlin decided to made the stadium available for Viktoria Berlin for two years. However, the capacity of the stadium will be reduced to 10,000 seats.

== Seasons ==
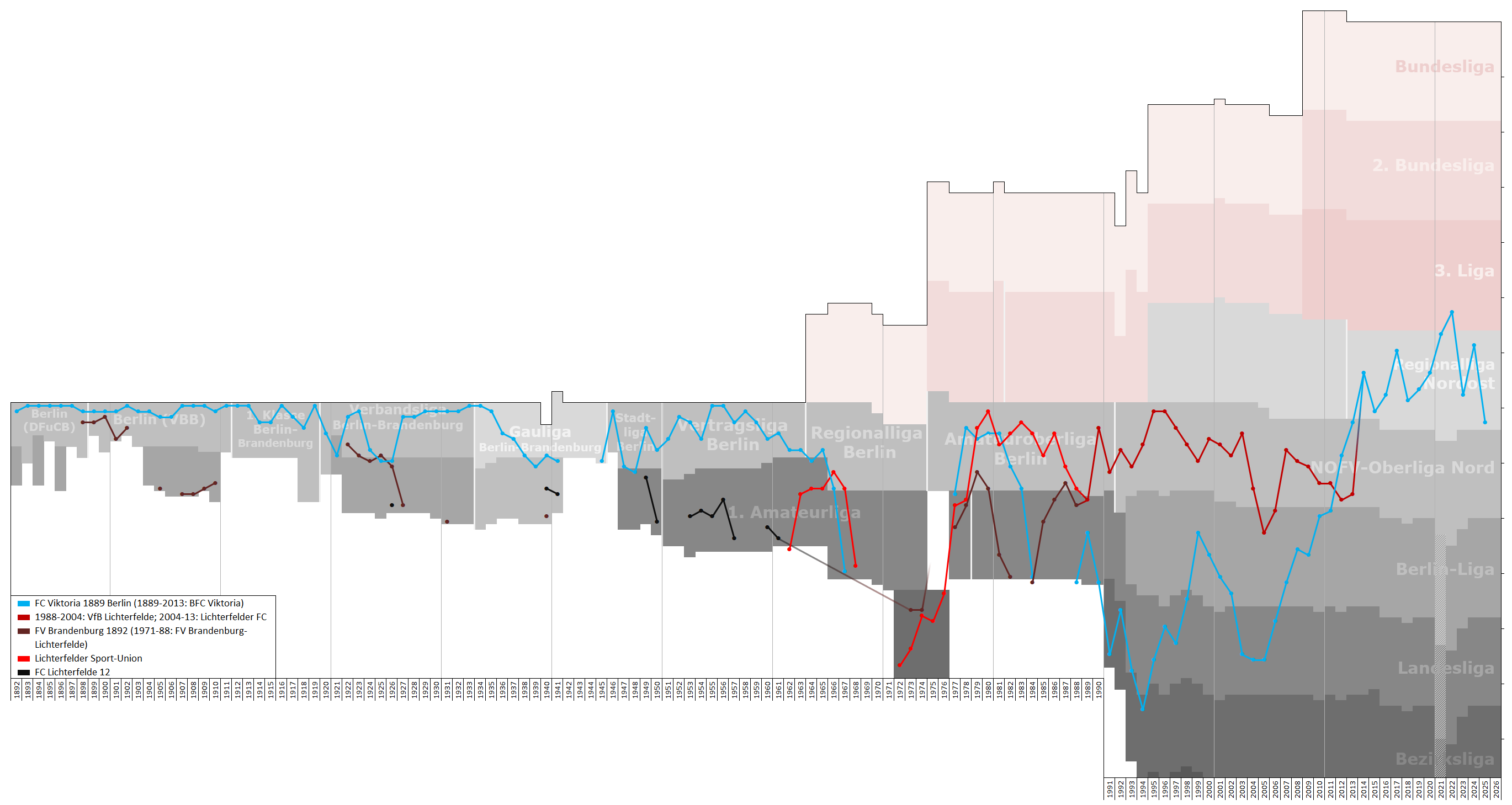
Historical chart of the club and its predecessor's league performance

== Honours ==
=== Regional ===
- Regionalliga Nordost (IV)
  - Winners: 2020–21
- Berlin Cup (III–VII)
  - Winners: 2013–14, 2018–19, 2021–22, 2024
  - Runners-up: 2019–20
