= 1905 German football championship final =

1905 German championship final
Endspiel um die Deutsche Fußballmeisterschaft
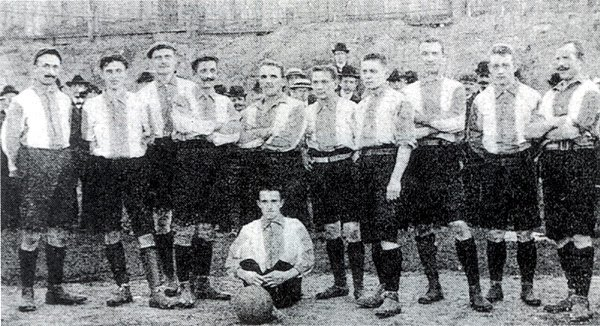
- Team photo of Union 92 Berlin
- Event: 1905 German football championship
Union 92 Berlin	Karlsruher FV
2	0
- Date: 11 June 1905
- Venue: Weidenpescher Park, Cologne
- Referee: Reginald Westendarp (Hamburg)
- Attendance: 3,500

The 1905 German football championship final decided the winner of the 1905 German football championship, the 2nd edition of the German football championship, a knockout football cup competition contested by the regional league winners to determine the national champions. The match was played on 11 June 1905 at the Weidenpescher Park in Cologne. Union 92 Berlin won the match 2–0 against Karlsruher FV for their 1st German title.

== Route to the final ==
The German football championship was an eleven team single-elimination knockout cup competition, featuring the champions of the regional football associations. There were a total of five rounds leading up to the final. For all matches, the winner after 90 minutes advances. If still tied, extra time was used to determine the winner.

Note: In all results below, the score of the finalist is given first.

Union 92 Berlin		Round	Karlsruher FV
Opponent	Result	1905 German football championship	Opponent	Result
Eintracht Braunschweig	4–1	Quarter-finals	Duisburger SpV	1–0
Dresdner SC	5–2	Semi-finals	Bye

== Match ==
=== Details ===
11 June 1905

Union 92 Berlin	2–0	Karlsruher FV
Wagenseil 10'; Herzog 50'	Report

Weidenpescher Park, Cologne
Attendance: 3,500
Referee: Reginald Westendarp (Hamburg)

Union 92 Berlin	Karlsruher FV

GK	(Germany) Willy Krüger
RB	(Germany) Otto Kähne
LB	(Germany) Alexander Bock
RH	(Germany) Felix Jurga
CH	(Germany) Kurt Heinrich (c)
LH	(Germany) Emil Reinke
OR	(Germany) Reinhard Bock
IR	(Germany) Alfred Wagenseil
CF	(Germany) O. Fröhde
IL	(Germany) Paul Herzog
OL	(Germany) Willi Pisara

GK	(Netherlands) Willem Schierbeek
RB	(Germany) Fritz Gutsch
LB	(Netherlands) Adolf Bouvy
RH	(Germany) Wilhelm Langer
CH	(Germany) Ivo Schricker (c)
LH	(Germany) Max Schwarze
OR	(Germany) Franz Ruzek
IR	(Germany) Louis Heck
CF	(Germany) Rudolf Wetzler
IL	(Germany) Julius Zinser
OL	(Germany) A. Holdermann

Match rules

- 90 minutes.
- 30 minutes of extra time if necessary.
- Unlimited 10 minute intervals of sudden death extra time if scores still level.
- Replay at the referee's discretion if no winner.
- No substitutions.
