= Paul Kugler =

German footballer

Personal information
- Date of birth: 24 September 1889
- Date of death: 2 February 1962 (aged 72)
- Position: Forward

Senior career*
Years	Team	Apps	(Gls)
- BFC Viktoria 1889

International career
1911–1913	Germany	2	(0)
- * Club domestic league appearances and goals

Paul Kugler (24 September 1889 – 2 February 1962) was a German international footballer.
