= Lorenz Huber =

German footballer

Personal information
- Date of birth: 24 February 1906
- Date of death: 6 October 1989 (aged 83)
- Position: Defender

Senior career*
Years	Team	Apps	(Gls)
- Karlsruher FV

International career
1932	Germany	1	(0)
- * Club domestic league appearances and goals

Lorenz Huber (24 February 1906 – 6 October 1989) was a German international footballer.
