= Fritz Ruchay =

German footballer and manager

Personal information
- Full name: Fritz Ruchay
- Date of birth: 12 December 1909
- Place of birth: Bialla, East Prussia, German Empire
- Date of death: 6 September 2000 (aged 90)
- Place of death: Germany
- Position: Midfielder

Senior career*
Years	Team	Apps	(Gls)
–1930	SpVgg ASCO Königsberg		
1930–1936	Prussia-Samland Königsberg		
1936–1938	Tennis Borussia Berlin		

International career
1935	Germany	1	(0)

Managerial career
- 1938–1939: Baden XI
- 1940–1947: Waldhof Mannheim
- 1950: Stuttgarter Kickers
- 1950–1951: 1. FC Pforzheim
- 1950–1952: Baden XI
- 1953–1954: Union Böckingen
- 1954–1956: VfR Kaiserslautern
- 1959–1960: Karlsruher FV
- * Club domestic league appearances and goals

Fritz Ruchay (12 December 1909 – 6 September 2000) was a German footballer and manager who played as a midfielder and made one appearance for the Germany national team.

== Career ==
Ruchay earned his first and only cap for Germany on 13 October 1935 in a friendly against Latvia. The home match, which took place in Königsberg, finished as a 3–0 win for Germany.

== Personal life ==
Ruchay died on 6 September 2000 at the age of 90.

== Career statistics ==
=== International ===
Germany
Year	Apps	Goals
1935	1	0
Total	1	0
