= Ludwig Damminger =

German footballer

Personal information
- Date of birth: 29 October 1913
- Date of death: 6 February 1981 (aged 67)
- Position: Forward

Senior career*
Years	Team	Apps	(Gls)
- Karlsruher FV

International career
1935	Germany	3	(5)
- * Club domestic league appearances and goals

Ludwig Damminger (29 October 1913 – 6 February 1981) was a German international footballer.

In two of his three internationals for the Germany national team, he scored two goals and also found the net in the other one.
