= Walther Bensemann =

German footballer (1873–1934)

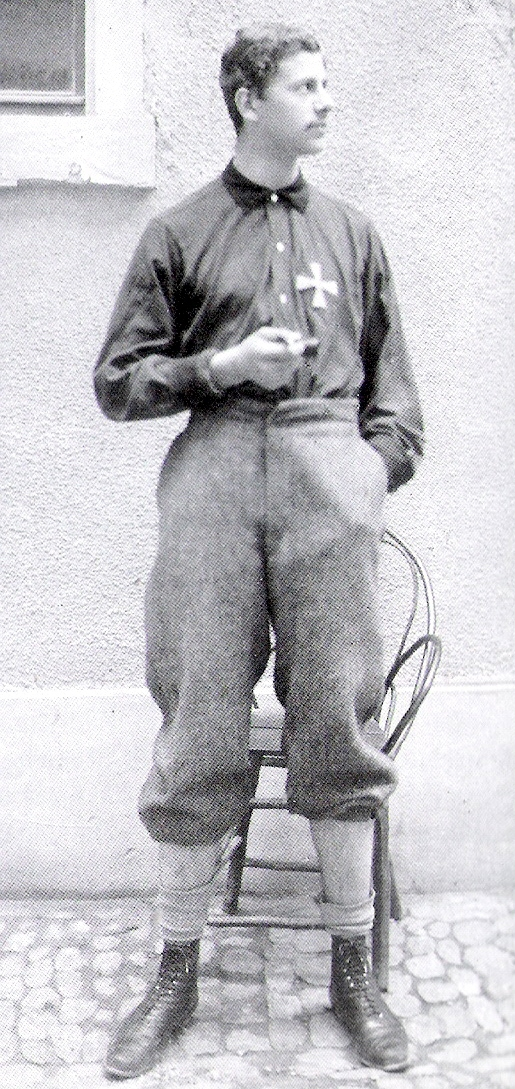
- Bensemann in 1896

Personal information
- Date of birth: 13 January 1873
- Place of birth: Berlin, Kingdom of Prussia, German Empire
- Date of death: 12 November 1934 (aged 61)
- Place of death: Montreux, Switzerland

Senior career*
Years	Team	Apps	(Gls)
1889-?	International Football Club		
1891-?	Karlsruher FV		
- * Club domestic league appearances and goals

Walther Bensemann (13 January 1873 – 12 November 1934) was a German pioneer of football and founder of the country's major sports publication, Kicker.

== Biography ==
Bensemann was born in Berlin, Brandenburg, as the son of a Jewish banker. During his time at private school in Montreux, Switzerland, he learned about the new sport of football. When he moved to Karlsruhe in order to complete his school-leavers' exam, he began to spread the sport around the German Empire.

There, in September 1889, he founded the International Football Club, the first football club in southern Germany, and two years later he was instrumental in the founding of Karlsruher FV, one of the first champion clubs in Germany. He was also involved in the creation of Frankfurter Kickers, who would later become Eintracht Frankfurt. In 1900 he belonged to the founding-fathers of the German Football Association.

Bensemann thought of football as a means of international understanding, so he started to organize international matches such as the ones between selections of Lausanne and southern Germany in 1893. Consequently, this also led to the five historical matches between selections from Germany and England between 1899 and 1901, which albeit not having any official status, are considered the historically first international matches of any Germany national side.

In 1920, Bensemann founded Kicker, which evolved soon into Germany's leading football magazine, a status which it retains today.

In 1933, the Nazi Machtergreifung in Germany compelled Benseman to move to Montreux where he died soon, relatively unnoticed and without means.

He also taught German at Birkenhead School in the Wirral.

== Walther Bensemann Prize ==
The German academy for football culture gives the Walther Bensemann prize every year to a person for extraordinary dedication with courage and a pioneering spirit, for social responsibility, fairplay, intercultural understanding in and around football. The prize comes with a monetary reward of €10,000. It was given amongst others to Franz Beckenbauer, Bobby Charlton, Marcello Lippi, Alex Ferguson.
