= Kurt Ehrmann =

German footballer (1922–2013)

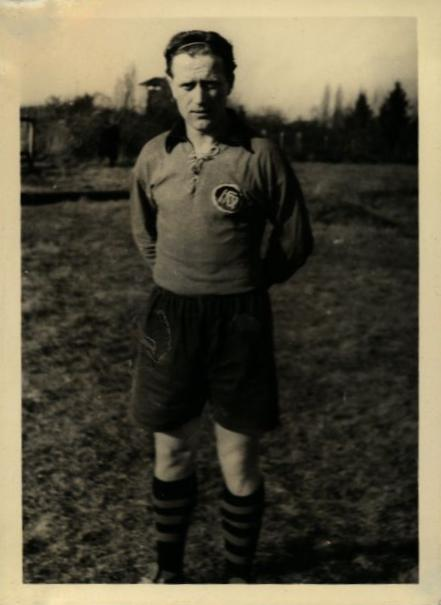

Personal information
- Full name: Kurt Ehrmann
- Date of birth: 7 June 1922
- Place of birth: Karlsruhe, Germany
- Date of death: 2 August 2013 (aged 91)
- Position: Forward

Youth career
- 1938–1940: Frankonia Karlsruhe

Senior career*
Years	Team	Apps	(Gls)
1946–1948	Karlsruher FV		
1948–1949	VfB Mühlburg		
1949–1956	Karlsruher FV		
1956–1960	1. FC Pforzheim		

International career
1952	West Germany	1	(0)
- * Club domestic league appearances and goals

Kurt Ehrmann (7 June 1922 – 2 August 2013) was a German international footballer. Born in Karlsruhe, Ehrmann played as a forward for Karlsruher FV, VfB Mühlburg and 1. FC Pforzheim. He also competed in the 1952 Summer Olympics.
