= Manfred Eglin =

German footballer

Personal information
- Full name: Manfred Eglin
- Date of birth: 10 October 1935
- Place of birth: Karlsruhe, Germany
- Date of death: 10 August 2001 (aged 65)
- Place of death: Zermatt, Switzerland
- Position: Goalkeeper

Youth career
- –1947: FV Daxlanden
- 1947–1953: Karlsruher FV

Senior career*
Years	Team	Apps	(Gls)
1953–1957	Karlsruher FV	69	(0)
1957–1963	Stuttgarter Kickers	100	(2)
Total		169	(2)
- * Club domestic league appearances and goals

Manfred Eglin (10 October 1935 – 10 August 2001) was a German footballer who played as a goalkeeper. Born in Karlsruhe, Eglin played for Karlsruher FV and Stuttgarter Kickers, and represented Germany in the 1956 Summer Olympics.
