= Wilhelm Gros =

German footballer

Personal information
- Date of birth: 6 July 1892
- Date of death: 13 September 1917 (aged 25)
- Position: Midfielder

Senior career*
Years	Team	Apps	(Gls)
- Karlsruher FV

International career
1912	Germany	1	(0)
- * Club domestic league appearances and goals

Wilhelm Gros (6 July 1892 – 13 September 1917) was a German international footballer.
