= 1905 German football championship =

Football tournament season

1905 German championship
Deutsche Fußballmeisterschaft
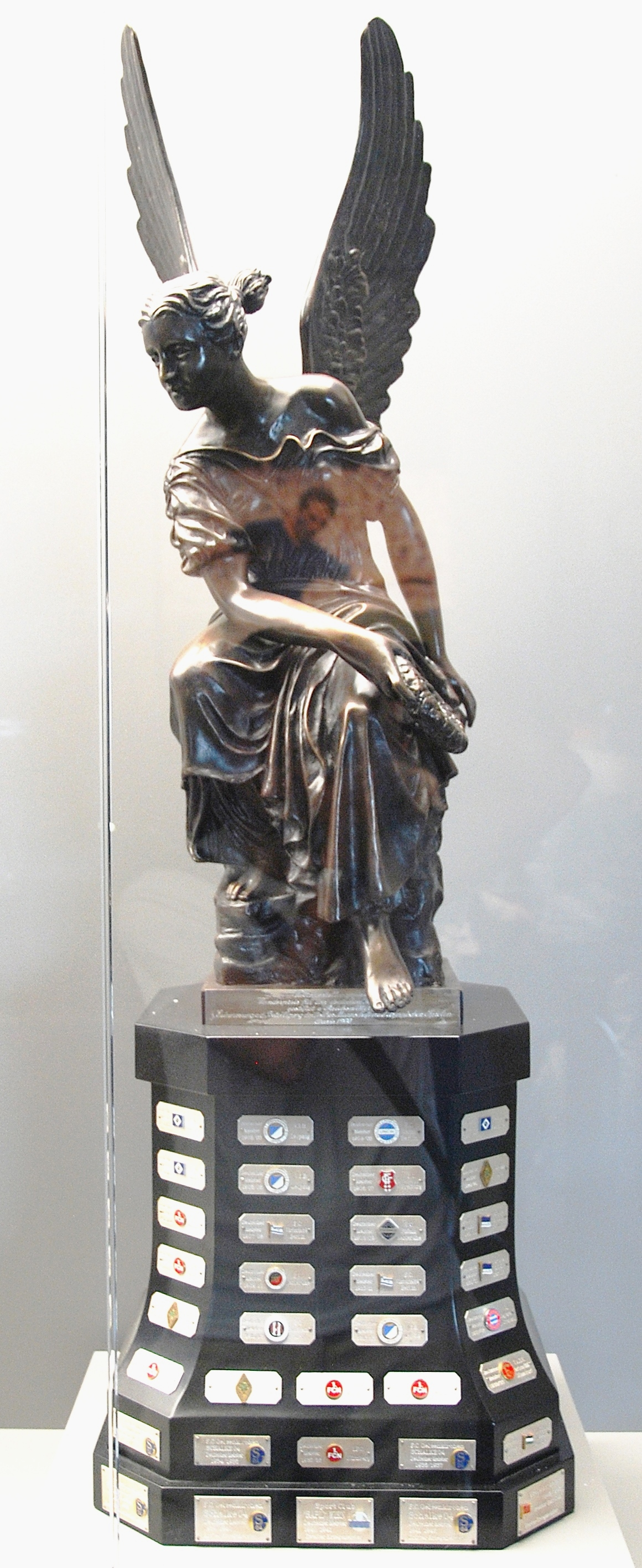
- Replica of the Viktoria trophy

Tournament details
- Country: Germany
- Dates: 9 April – 11 June
- Teams: 11

Final positions
- Champions: Union 92 Berlin; 1st German title
- Runner-up: Karlsruher FV

Tournament statistics
- Matches played: 8
- Goals scored: 37 (4.63 per match)
- Top goal scorer(s): Paul Herzog; Reinhard Richter (4 goals each)

The 1905 German football championship was the third time clubs in Germany competed for the national title under the auspices of the German Football Association (DFB). There were eleven entries into the competition, marking a new record. For the first time, the holders were given an automatic spot in the competition, taken by VfB Leipzig who had won the 1903 German football championship and had reached the final in the year before, when the competition was annulled.

The large number of participants and the differences in strength persuaded the DFB to hold preliminary rounds before the quarterfinals. However, the dire financial situation of Schlesien Breslau and VfB Leipzig led to those two teams not travelling to their matches. New matches were scheduled, making for a confusing schedule and semifinals with only three teams.

Both finalists appeared for the first time with Union 92 Berlin winning their only national title.

== Qualified teams ==
The qualified teams:

Qualified team	Qualified from
Schlesien Breslau	Breslau champions
Alemannia Cottbus	Niederlausitz champions
Union 92 Berlin	VBB champions
Dresdner SC	Central German champions
VfB Leipzig	Defending champions (1903)
Viktoria 96 Magdeburg	Magdeburg champions
Victoria Hamburg	HAFB champions
Eintracht Braunschweig	Brunswick champions
Hannoverscher FC	Hanover champions
Duisburger SpV	Western German champions
Karlsruher FV	Southern German champions

== Competition ==
=== First qualifying round ===
9 April 1905 Preliminary	Schlesien Breslau	5 – 1	Alemannia Cottbus	Dresden
				Stadium: Heinz-Steyer-Stadion; Referee: Max Landrock

=== Second qualifying round ===
9 April 1905 Preliminary	Eintracht Braunschweig	3–2 (a.e.t.)	Hannover 96	Magdeburg
				Stadium: Victoriaplatz; Referee: Hans Dreßler

16 April 1905 Preliminary	SV Victoria 96 Magdeburg	not played	Schlesien Breslau	Leipzig

Breslau did not travel to Leipzig, citing financial reasons. Magdeburg were then scheduled to play Eintracht Braunschweig instead.

=== Third qualifying round ===
30 April 1905 Preliminary	Eintracht Braunschweig	2 – 1	SV Victoria 96 Magdeburg	Berlin
				Stadium: Germania-Platz Tempelhof; Referee: Otto Hiller

=== Quarter-finals ===
28 May 1905 Quarter-final	Karlsruher FV	1 – 0	Duisburger SV	Hanau
	Zinser 45'			Stadium: Zur Schönen Aussicht; Referee: Roth

28 May 1905 Quarter-final	Dresdner SC	5 – 3	SC Victoria Hamburg	Berlin
	Neumann 13', 18'; Richter 48', 50'; Große 84'		Garrn 4'; Hagenah 42'; Fricke 60'	Stadium: Germania-Platz Tempelhof; Referee: Paul Faber

Quarter-final	VfB Leipzig	not played	Eintracht Braunschweig

VfB Leipzig did not travel to the match citing financial reasons. Braunschweig were instead scheduled to play Union 92 Berlin who had originally received a bye to the semifinals.

28 May 1905 Quarter-final	Union 92 Berlin	4 – 1	Eintracht Braunschweig	Magdeburg
				Stadium: Victoriaplatz; Referee: Hans Dreßler

=== Semi-finals ===
4 June 1905 Semi-final	Dresdner SC	2 – 5	Union 92 Berlin	Leipzig
				Stadium: Radrennbahn; Referee: Hans Dreßler

Karlsruher FV received a bye to the final.

=== Final ===
11 June 1905

Union 92 Berlin	2–0	Karlsruher FV
Wagenseil 10'; Herzog 50'	Report

Weidenpescher Park, Cologne
Attendance: 3,500
Referee: Reginald Westendarp (Hamburg)
