= Paul Kühnle =

German footballer

Personal information
- Date of birth: 10 April 1885
- Date of death: 28 December 1970 (aged 85)
- Position: Defender

Senior career*
Years	Team	Apps	(Gls)
- Stuttgarter Kickers

International career
1910–1911	Germany	2	(0)
- * Club domestic league appearances and goals

Paul Kühnle (10 April 1885 – 28 December 1970) was a German international footballer.
