= Otto Reiser =

German footballer

Personal information
- Full name: Otto Reiser
- Date of birth: 24 December 1884
- Place of birth: Germany
- Date of death: 1961 (aged 76–77)
- Position: Midfielder

Senior career*
Years	Team	Apps	(Gls)
1903–1904	BTuFC Britannia 1892		
1905–1918	Phönix Karlsruhe		

International career
1911	Germany	1	(0)
- * Club domestic league appearances and goals

Otto Reiser (24 December 1884 – 1961) was a German international footballer who played for BTuFC Britannia 1892 and Phönix Karlsruhe. He also won one cap for the Germany national team in 1911.
