= Leopold Richter =

German footballer

Personal information
- Full name: Leopold Richter
- Date of birth: 22 May 1885
- Place of birth: Dresden, Germany
- Date of death: 3 August 1941 (aged 56)
- Position: Midfielder

Senior career*
Years	Team	Apps	(Gls)
1901–1906	Dresdner SC		
1906–1909	VfB Leipzig		

International career
1909	Germany	1	(0)
- * Club domestic league appearances and goals

Leopold Richter (22 May 1885 – 3 August 1941) was a German international footballer who played for Dresdner SC and VfB Leipzig. He was also capped once for the Germany national team in 1909.
