= Josef Glaser =

German footballer

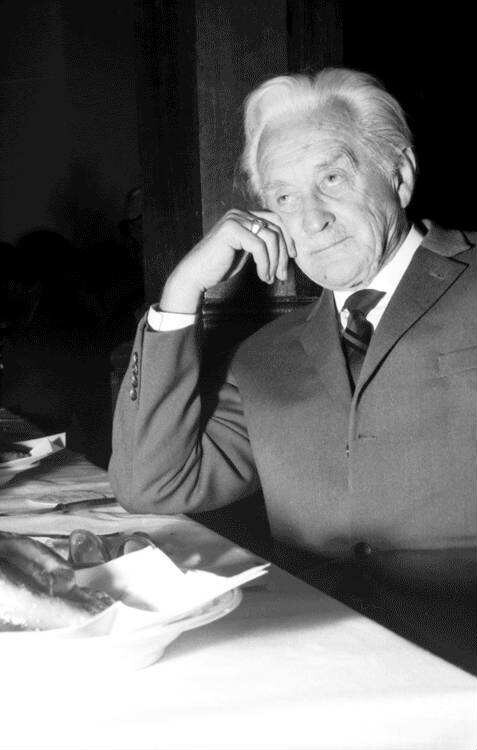

Personal information
- Date of birth: 11 May 1887
- Place of birth: St. Blasien, Germany
- Date of death: 12 August 1969 (aged 82)
- Place of death: Freiburg im Breisgau, Germany
- Position: Midfielder

International career
Years	Team	Apps	(Gls)
1912	Germany	1	

Josef Glaser (11 May 1887 – 12 August 1969) was a German amateur footballer who played as a midfielder and competed in the 1912 Summer Olympics. He was a member of the German Olympic squad and played one match in the consolation tournament.
