= Kicker (magazine) =

German sports magazine

- Editor: Rainer Holzschuh
- Categories: Sports magazine
- Frequency: Twice weekly
- Publisher: Olympia-Verlag GmbH
- First issue: 14 July 1920; 106 years ago
- Country: Germany
- Based in: Nuremberg, Germany
- Language: German
- Website: kicker.de

Kicker (stylized in all lowercase) is a Germany sports magazine, focused primarily on football. The magazine was founded in 1920 by German football pioneer Walther Bensemann and is published twice weekly, usually Monday and Thursday. Each edition sells around 80,000 copies. Kicker is a founding member of European Sports Media, an association of football publications.

Kicker annually awards the most prolific scorer of the Bundesliga with the Kicker Torjägerkanone (lit. 'Kicker scorer cannon') award. It is equivalent to the Pichichi Trophy in Spanish football.

The magazine also publishes an almanac, the Kicker Fußball-Almanach. It was first published from 1937 to 1942, and then continuously from 1959 to date. They also publish a yearbook (Kicker Fußball-Jahrbuch).

== History ==
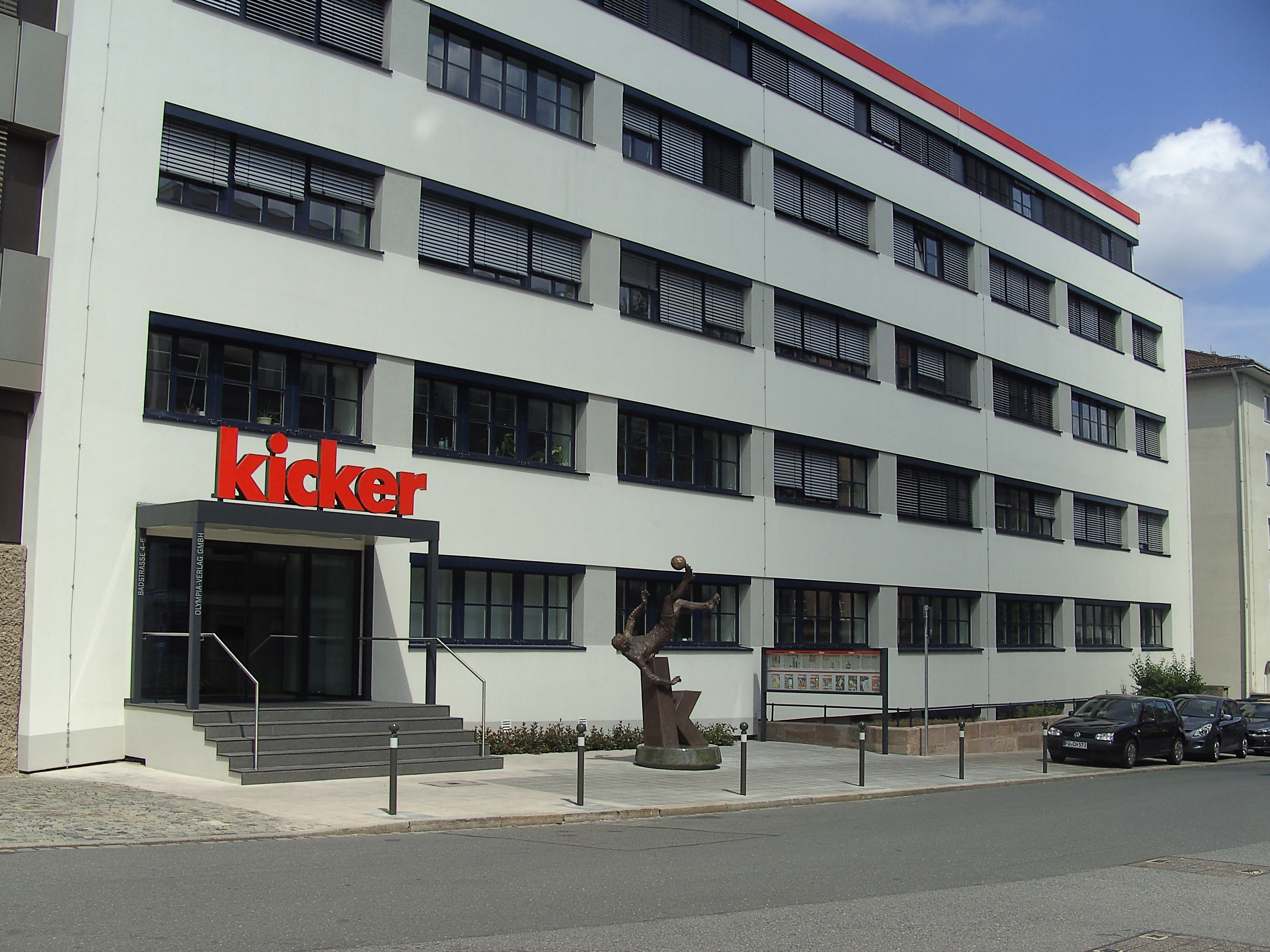
The head office of Kicker in Nuremberg with the Kicker statue in front of the main entrance

Kicker was first issued in July 1920 in Konstanz, Germany. The magazine's headquarters were originally in Stuttgart before relocating to Nuremberg in 1926. During World War II, the magazine merged with the publication Fußball, and was eventually discontinued in fall 1944. After the war, the magazine was again published (under the name Sport) by the newly incorporated Olympia-Verlag publishing company. Former chief editor Friedebert Becker again began publishing Kicker in 1951, and for a number of years, both Kicker and Sport appeared at the same time. In 1966, Kicker was sold to Axel Springer AG. In 1968, Olympia-Verlag in Nuremberg acquired Kicker and merged it with Sportmagazin, which had been published twice weekly since 1952. The first issue of the newly founded Kicker-Sportmagazin was released on 7 October 1968. Beside the two weekly publications, Kicker provides a digital edition since 2012. The online version of kicker.de offers a broad live ticker for over 80 different international leagues. The magazine has three apps in the iTunes store.

== Magazine ==
The modern version of Kicker covers a number of sporting competitions and events, including:

- The German Bundesliga, 2. Bundesliga, 3. Liga, and Regionalliga
- The German DFB-Pokal
- The Germany national team and Germany women's national football team
- The German Women's Bundesliga
- Various European leagues and competitions, including the Premier League, La Liga, Serie A, and Ligue 1
- Various international football leagues
- Formula One racing
- The Olympic Games
- eSports and competitive video gaming
- Various other sporting events, depending on on-going competitions

== Kicker Sportmagazin Club of the Century ==
In 1998, Kicker published a list of the best football clubs of the 20th century. The list was based on the opinions of former players and managers (Giovanni Trapattoni, Johan Cruyff, Udo Lattek, Just Fontaine etc.). Each of them could name their choice for the five greatest teams and provide arguments in support thereof. Not all of them stuck to the allotted number of picks. For example, Johan Cruyff only picked three teams - Ajax, Milan and Dynamo Kyiv.

Each club's trophies and Ballon d'Or winners are shown up until 1999

Rank	Club	Continental trophies	Ballon d'Or winners	Domestic trophies
1	(Spain) Real Madrid	7x UEFA Champions League, 2x UEFA Cup, UEFA Super Cup	2x Di Stéfano, Kopa	27x La Liga, 17x Copa del Rey
2	(Netherlands) Ajax	4x UEFA Champions League, UEFA Cup Winners' Cup, UEFA Cup, 2x UEFA Super Cup	Cruyff	27x Eredivisie, 14x KNVB Cup
3	(Italy) Milan	5x UEFA Champions League, 2x UEFA Cup, 3x UEFA Super Cup	3x Van Basten, Rivera, Gullit, Weah	16x Serie A, 4x Coppa Italia
4	(Germany) Bayern Munich	3x UEFA Champions League, UEFA Cup Winners' Cup, UEFA Cup, UEFA Super Cup	2x Beckenbauer, 2x Rummenigge, G. Müller	15x German champions, 9x DFB Pokal
5	(Spain) Barcelona	UEFA Champions League, 4x UEFA Cup Winners' Cup, 2x UEFA Super Cup	2x Cruyff, Stoichkov, Rivaldo	16x La Liga, 24x Copa del Rey
6	(England) Manchester United	2x UEFA Champions League, UEFA Cup Winners' Cup, UEFA Super Cup	Law, Charlton, Best	12x English champions, 10x FA Cup, League Cup
7	(Portugal) Benfica	2x UEFA Champions League	Eusébio	30x Primeira Liga, 26x Taça de Portugal
8	(Ukraine) Dynamo Kyiv	2x UEFA Cup Winners' Cup, European Super Cup	Blokhin, Belanov	13x USSR Top League, 7x UPL; 9x USSR Cup, 4x Ukrainian Cup
9	(Italy) Juventus	2x UEFA Champions League, UEFA Cup Winners' Cup, 3x UEFA Cup, 2x UEFA Super Cup	3x Platini, Sivori, Rossi, Baggio, Zidane	26x Serie A, 9x Coppa Italia
10	(Italy) Inter Milan	2x UEFA Champions League, 3x UEFA Cup	Matthäus, Ronaldo	13x Serie A, 3x Coppa Italia

== Greatest Clubs (1863–2014) ==
In 2014, the magazine created a new list of the best clubs in history. This time it was formed based on the opinions of the magazine's editors. The list was based on criteria as the clubs' history, achievements at international stage, titles won and the career of its own players. In the Top 10, three teams represented Germany.

Each club's trophies and Ballon d'Or winners are shown up until 2023

Rank	Club	Continental trophies	Ballon d'Or winners	Domestic trophies
1	(Spain) Real Madrid	13x UEFA Champions League, 2x UEFA Cup, 4x UEFA Super Cup	4x C. Ronaldo, 2x Di Stéfano, Kopa, Figo, Ronaldo, Cannavaro	34x La Liga, 19x Copa del Rey
2	(Germany) Bayern Munich	6x UEFA Champions League, UEFA Cup Winners' Cup, UEFA Cup, 2x UEFA Super Cup	2x Beckenbauer, 2x Rummenigge, G. Müller	33x German champions, 20x DFB-Pokal
3	(England) Manchester United	3x UEFA Champions League, UEFA Cup Winners' Cup, UEFA Cup, UEFA Super Cup	Law, Charlton, Best, C. Ronaldo	20x English champions, 12x FA Cup, 5x League Cup
4	(England) Liverpool	6x UEFA Champions League, 3x UEFA Cup, 4x UEFA Super Cup	Michael Owen	19x English champions, 7x FA Cup, 8x League Cup
5	(Spain) Barcelona	5x UEFA Champions League, 4x UEFA Cup Winners' Cup, 5x UEFA Super Cup	6x Messi, 2x Cruyff, Stoichkov, Rivaldo, Ronaldinho	26x La Liga, 31x Copa del Rey
6	(Italy) Milan	7x UEFA Champions League, 2x UEFA Cup, 5x UEFA Super Cup	3x Van Basten, Rivera, Gullit, Weah, Shevchenko, Kaká	18x Serie A, 5x Coppa Italia
7	(Italy) Juventus	2x UEFA Champions League, UEFA Cup Winners' Cup, 3x UEFA Cup, 2x UEFA Super Cup	3x Platini, Sivori, Rossi, Baggio, Zidane, Nedvěd	36x Serie A, 14x Coppa Italia
8	(Argentina) Boca Juniors	6x CONMEBOL Libertadores, 2x CONMEBOL Sudamericana, 4x CONMEBOL Recopa	–	34x Argentine PL, 14x Argentine Cup
9	(Germany) Hamburger SV	UEFA Champions League, European Cup Winners' Cup	2x Keegan	6x German champions, 3x DFB-Pokal
10	(Germany) Borussia Mönchengladbach	2x UEFA Cup	Simonsen	5x Bundesliga, 3x DFB-Pokal
