= Robert Neumaier =

German footballer

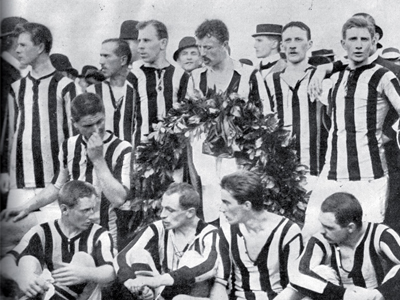

Personal information
- Date of birth: 14 April 1885
- Date of death: 22 March 1959 (aged 73)
- Position: Defender

Senior career*
Years	Team	Apps	(Gls)
- Phönix Karlsruhe

International career
1909–1912	Germany	3	(0)
- * Club domestic league appearances and goals

Robert Neumaier (14 April 1885 – 22 March 1959) was a German international footballer.
