= Paul Fischer (footballer) =

German footballer

Personal information
- Date of birth: 6 September 1882
- Date of death: 6 February 1942 (aged 59)
- Position: Defender

Senior career*
Years	Team	Apps	(Gls)
- BFC Viktoria 1889

International career
1908	Germany	1	(0)
- * Club domestic league appearances and goals

Paul Fischer (6 September 1882 – 6 February 1942) was a German international footballer.
