= Karlsruher FV =

German football club

- Full name: Karlsruher Fussballverein e.V.
- Nickname: KFV
- Founded: 1891; 135 years ago
- Ground: Joachim-Kurzaj-Weg 5
- Capacity: 1,000
- Chairman: Christian Seeberger
- Manager: Samed Aksoy
- League: Kreisklasse B Karlsruhe
- 2024–25: 3rd
| Home colours | Away colours |

The Karlsruher Fußball-Verein e. V. is a German association football club that plays in Karlsruhe, Baden-Württemberg. Established on 17 November 1891, KFV was a founding member of the German Football Association (Deutscher Fussball-Bund) in 1900 and is the oldest still existing football club in Southern Germany. The club was one of the leading German football clubs before the First World War. The team went on to capture the national championship in 1910 with a 1–0 victory over Holstein Kiel, but lost the final in 1905 and 1912. The KFV claimed the Southern German football championship from 1901 to 1905 and from 1910 to 1912. After a financial collapse and a resulting disqualification from league operations in 2004, the club continued its activities in 2007. They currently compete in Kreisklasse B1 Karlsruhe, the tenth tier of German football.

== History ==
=== Early prominence ===
KFV co-founder Walther Bensemann established Internationaler FC Karlsruhe, the first football team in south Germany, in 1889. This club became part of KFV in 1894. He also had a hand in founding the Frankfurter Kickers a predecessor side to Eintracht Frankfurt. As well, Bensemann established kicker, Germany's first football magazine. KFV was one of Germany's most successful sides in the years before the First World War. The club captured the South German title eight times from 1901 to 1912, leading to national final appearances in 1905, 1910, and 1912. KFV figures in the strange story of Germany's first national championship in 1903 which was won by VfB Leipzig in a 7–2 victory over DFC Prague. The Karlruhers were scheduled to play a semi-final match against Prag in Leipzig, but cancelled their travel plans when they received a telegram – allegedly from the German Football Association (Deutscher Fussball Bund or German football Association) – indicating that the game had been rescheduled. Prag was awarded a win by forfeit when their opponents failed to show, and so made an uncontested advance to the final in spite of vehement protests by KFV. It has never been discovered who sent the telegram and people from Karlsruhe still search to this day to find who was responsible. Even Günter Grass wrote about this incident in his book My Century. Denied a place in the national final, Karlsruhe did manage to arrange to challenge Leipzig the following year in a match representing the contest that might have been, but lost the game 3–7. KFV also played a key role in the incomplete national final of 1904. Beaten 1–6 by Britannia Berlin in a semi-final match played in Berlin, Karlsruhe protested the result as under league rules the match was to have been played at a neutral venue. Ultimately, the DFB cancelled the final and the Viktoria trophy was not awarded that year. KFV reached the final in 1905 for the first time and lost against Union 92 Berlin 2–0. KFV's championship was earned under the direction of English coach William Townley, a prominent figure in the early history of the game in Germany. In 1912, KFV lost the final against Holstein Kiel, 1–0.

From 1908, the club played in the new Südkreis-Liga, which it won in 1910, 1911 and 1912. In 1909, Phönix Karlsruhe, known today as Karlsruher SC, brought the city its first national championship. KFV's win the following year makes Karlsruhe one of only three cities in Germany that have been home to two or more national football champions. The others are Munich (FC Bayern Munich and TSV 1860 München) and Berlin (Union 92 Berlin, BFC Viktoria 1889, Hertha BSC). Karlsruhe is the only city with two different teams that won the championship in two subsequent years.

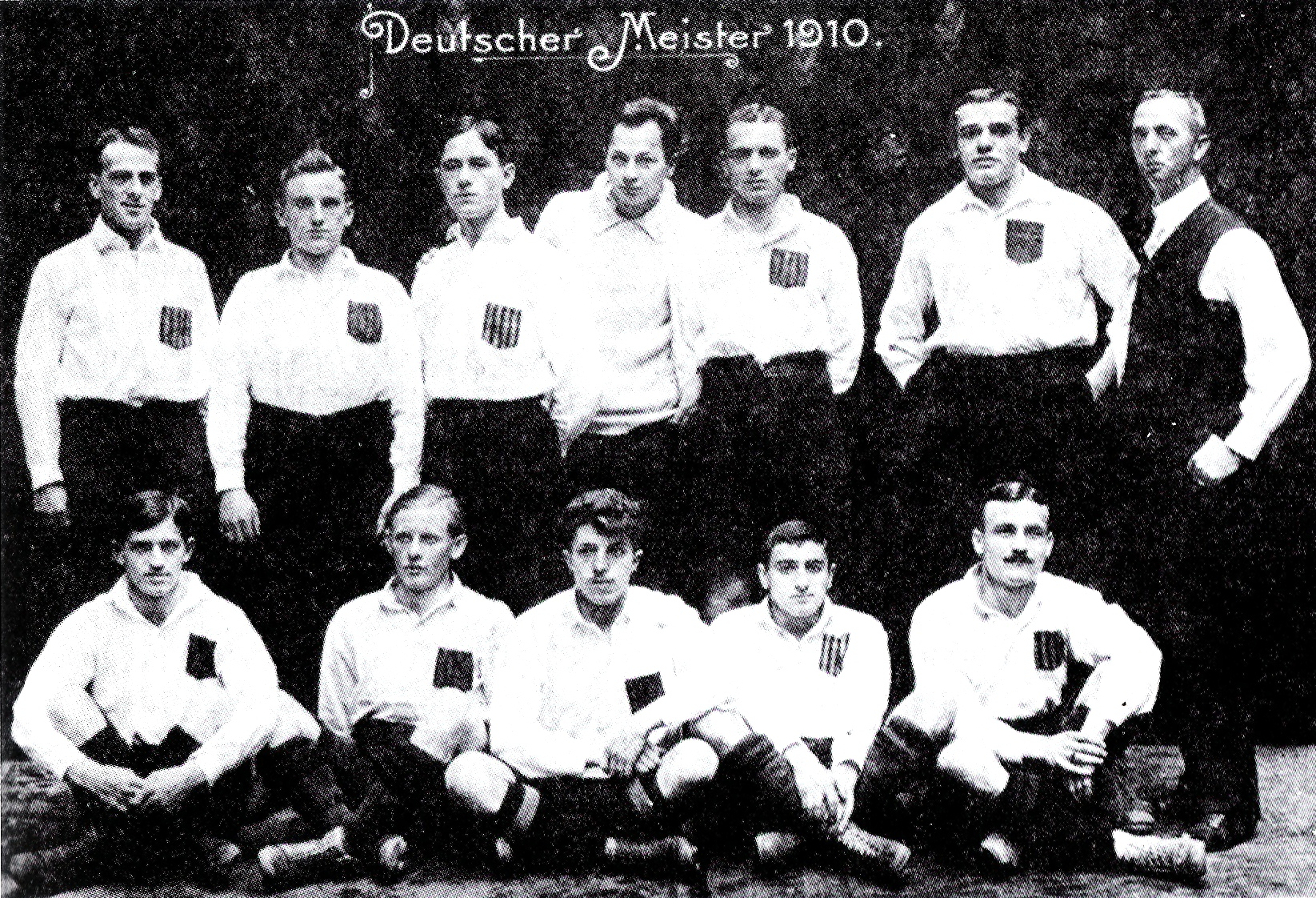
Karlsruher FV in 1910, with Gottfried Fuchs lower left, and Julius Hirsch lower right - one from the end

Julius Hirsch, together with Fritz Förderer and Gottfried Fuchs, formed an attacking trio for the team. He helped Karlsruher FV win the 1910 German football championship.

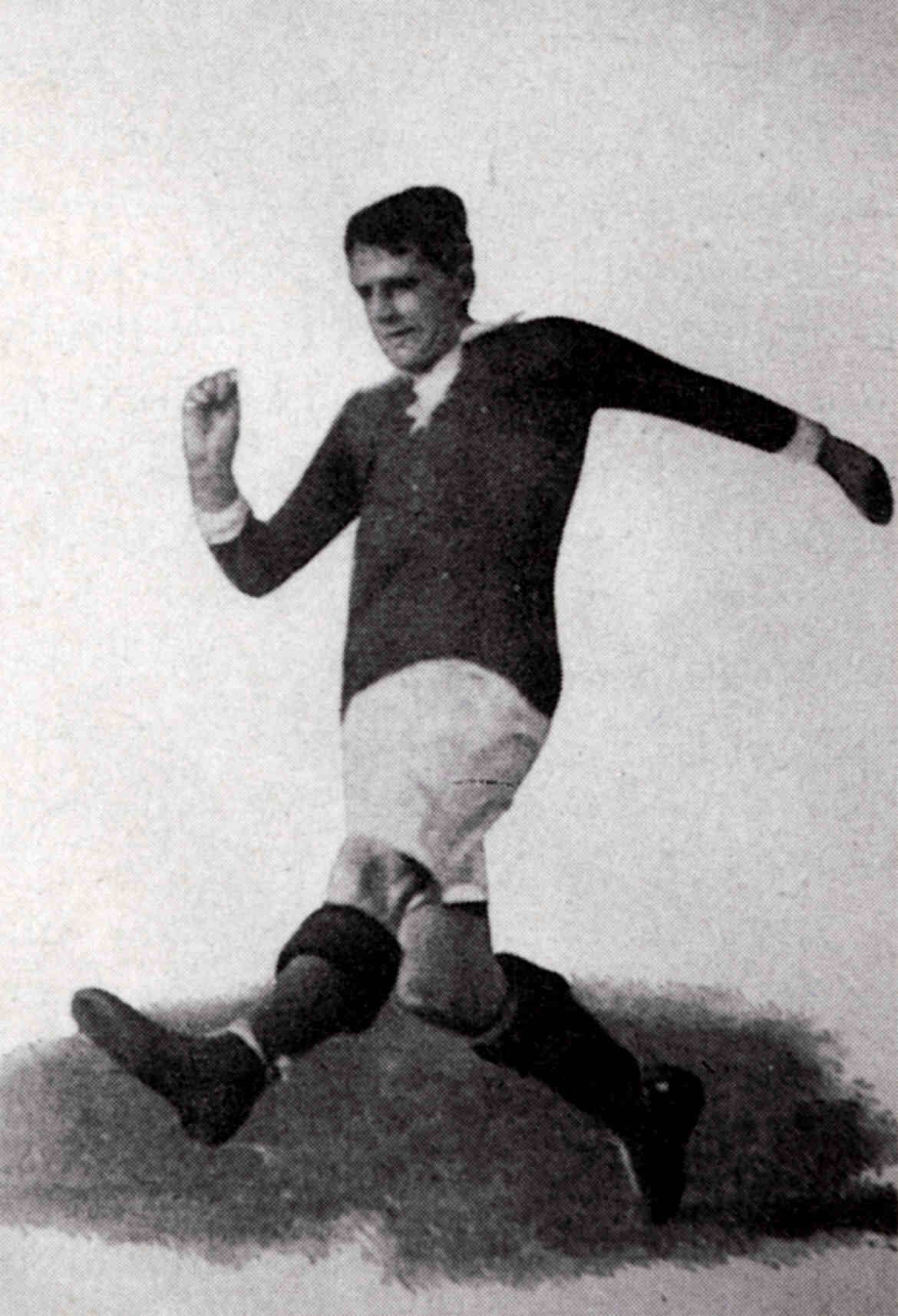
Gottfried Fuchs

While playing for the national team in 1912, KFV's Gottfried Fuchs scored 10 goals in a contest against Russia to set a German international match record that still stands. Fuchs and his fellow player Julius Hirsch were the only Jewish players to ever represent the Germany national team.

KFV made its re-appearance after the First World War, first in the Kreisliga Südwest and then in the Bezirksliga Württemberg-Baden, Gruppe Baden with the capture of the league championship in 1926. While they went on to dominate their division, the team was not able to make its way out of the South German league playoffs and back onto the national stage. From 1925 to 1931 Jimmy Lawrence, the record holding former Newcastle United goal keeper and Preston North End manager relocated to Germany to manage Karlsruher FV. With the club he won the regional championships of Württemberg/Baden in 1926 and of Baden in 1928, 1929 and 1931 which qualified the club to participate in the matches for the German football championship in those years. In 1933, Karlsruher FV took up play in the Gauliga Baden, one of the sixteen first division leagues established in the re-organization of German football under the Third Reich. The club was relegated in 1937, but made a prompt return to the top flight after a one-year absence. Sent down again in 1941 they came back to play the 1943–44 season, after which the rump of the division struggled through just one more truncated season as Allied forces rolled through Germany in the last days of World War II.

=== Postwar play ===
KFV played in the Oberliga Süd where they finished dead last, five points in back of rivals Phönix Karlsruhe. Not immediately relegated as the league was being re-structured, the club played another season in the Oberliga Süd, and this time both Karlsruhe sides were relegated, although FV did manage to finish ahead of Phönix. Karlsruher FV emerged in the 2nd Oberliga Süd in 1951–52 and played second division football there until being relegated in 1957. The club won two titles in the Amateurliga Nordbaden (III) in 1952 and 1974 but after this the team fell to tier V Kreisliga play before being disqualified from league operations in October 2004, after collapsing financially.

=== Revival ===
The club was not dissolved at any time after the disqualification from league operations and returned to amateur league football in 2007, finishing 9th in the Kreisklasse C, Staffel 3 – Kreis Karlsruhe (X), the lowest division in the North Baden region, in 2007–08. The 2008–09 season proved disastrous for the club, coming last in its division with only one win and 21 losses in 24 games. After a tenth place in 2009–10, in 2010–11, the side finished 15th and last once more, with only two wins, a draw and 27 defeats and 127 goals conceded. The club came last in its division once more in 2011–12 but conceded less than 100 goals in this season. In 2017-18 the club went on to finish 2nd and was promoted to the Kreisklasse B after two victories in the play-offs.

== Honours ==
The club's honours:

=== League ===
- German football championship
  - Champions: 1910
- Southern German championship
  - Champions: 1901, 1902, 1903, 1904, 1905, 1910, 1911, 1912

=== Regional ===
- Südkreis-Liga (I)
  - Champions: 1910, 1911, 1912
- Kreisliga Südwest (I)
  - Champions: 1922
- Bezirksliga Württemberg-Baden (I)
  - Champions: 1927
- Bezirksliga Baden (I)
  - Champions: 1928, 1929, 1931, 1932

=== Cup ===
- North Baden Cup (Tiers III-VII)
  - Winners: 1961, 1962, 1965

== Notable former players ==
- (Germany) Julius Hirsch
- (Germany) Gottfried Fuchs
- (Germany) Hermann Bosch
- (Germany) Max Breunig
- (Germany) Fritz Förderer
- (Germany) Wilhelm Gros
- (Germany) Ernst Hollstein
- (Germany) Lorenz Huber
- (Germany) Franz Immig
- (Germany) Manfred Eglin
- (Germany) Ernst Willimowski
- (Germany) Ludwig Damminger
- (Germany) Kurt Ehrmann
- (Turkey) Bekir Refet
- (France) Fritz Keller
- (Germany) Michael Nees
- (Germany) Pietro Lombardi

== Notable former coaches ==
- (England) William Townley
- (Germany) Karl Striebinger
- (Germany) Fritz Ruchay
- (Germany) Bernhard Termath
- (Scotland) Jimmy Lawrence

== Notable former athletes ==
- (Germany) Lina Radke
- (Germany) Georg Amberger
- (Germany) Albert Steinmetz

== Former Chairmen and patrons ==
- (Germany) Friedrich Wilhelm Nohe
- (Germany) Ivo Schricker
- (Germany) Walther Bensemann
- (Germany) Prince Maximilian of Baden

== Recent seasons ==
The recent season-by-season performance of the club:

| Season | Division | Tier | Position |
|---|---|---|---|
| 2007–08 | Kreisklasse C Karlsruhe Staffel 1 | X | 8th |
| 2008–09 | Kreisklasse C Karlsruhe Staffel 1 | XI | 13th |
| 2009–10 | Kreisklasse C Karlsruhe Staffel 1 | XI | 10th |
| 2010–11 | Kreisklasse C Karlsruhe Staffel 1 | XI | 15th |
| 2011–12 | Kreisklasse C Karlsruhe Staffel 1 | XI | 15th |
| 2012–13 | Kreisklasse C Karlsruhe Staffel 1 | XI | 10th |
| 2013–14 | Kreisklasse C Karlsruhe Staffel 1 | XI | 9th |
| 2014–15 | Kreisklasse C Karlsruhe Staffel 1 | XI | 11th |
| 2015–16 | Kreisklasse C Karlsruhe Staffel 1 | XI | 14th |
| 2016–17 | Kreisklasse C Karlsruhe Staffel 1 | XI | 15th |
| 2017–18 | Kreisklasse C Karlsruhe Staffel 1 | XI | 2nd ↑ |
| 2018–19 | Kreisklasse B Karlsruhe Staffel 2 | X | 11th |
| 2019–20 | Kreisklasse B Karlsruhe Staffel 2 | X | 4th |

- With the introduction of the Regionalligas in 1994 and the 3. Liga in 2008 as the new third tier, below the 2. Bundesliga, all leagues below dropped one tier.

| ↑ Promoted | ↓ Relegated |
