= Willi Knesebeck =

German footballer

Personal information
- Date of birth: 31 March 1887
- Date of death: 18 September 1956 (aged 69)
- Position: Midfielder

Senior career*
Years	Team	Apps	(Gls)
- Viktoria 89 Berlin

International career
1911–1912	Germany	2	(0)

Managerial career
- 1935–1938: Hertha BSC
- * Club domestic league appearances and goals

Willi Knesebeck (31 March 1887 – 18 September 1956) was a German international footballer.
