= Otto Dumke =

German footballer

Personal information
- Date of birth: 29 April 1887
- Date of death: 4 August 1912 (aged 25)
- Position: Forward

Senior career*
Years	Team	Apps	(Gls)
- BFC Viktoria 1889

International career
1911	Germany	2	(3)
- * Club domestic league appearances and goals

Otto Dumke (29 April 1887 – 4 August 1912) was a German international footballer.
