= SV Blitz Breslau =

German football club

Blitz Breslau
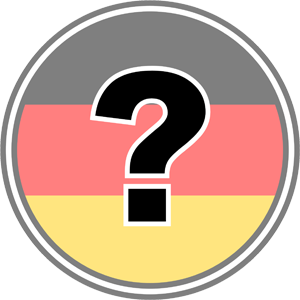
- Full name: SV Blitz Breslau
- Founded: 1897
Home colours	Away colours

SV Blitz Breslau was a German football club playing in Breslau, Lower Silesia in what was then part of Germany but is today Wrocław, Poland. The club was established on 1 April 1897 by former members of the cycling club Radverein Blitz Breslau. SVB was one of the founding members of the German Football Association (Deutscher Fussball Bund or German Football Association) established in Leipzig in 1900.

== History ==
A split of the association led to the formation of Sport Club Schlesien Breslau on 26 August 1901. SC captured local titles in the Verband Breslauer Ballspiel-Vereine (VBBB) over four consecutive seasons from 1904 to 1907 leading to participation in regional level competition and championships in the Südostdeutscher Fussball Verband in 1906 and 1907. Subsequent appearances in the national level playoffs ended with quarter final losses.

What remained of parent club SV Blitz Breslau adopted the name Verein für Rasenspiel 1897 Breslau on 2 May 1907 and then went on to enjoy their own successes. They followed SC as three time VBBB champions from 1908 to 1910 and as Südostdeutscher titlists in 1908 and 1910. VfR also went out in the quarter-finals in their two national level appearances.

Several members of SC left the club in 1919 to create a football department within Turnverein Vorwärts Breslau. This club later merged with 1911 Krietern to form FV Rapide Breslau and earned a semi-final appearance in SOFV play in 1921. SC and Rapid were united in 1924 to form Schlesien 01 Rapid Breslau. By 1925 this club was again playing simply as SC Schlesien Breslau.

In 1934 these threads were all brought together when VfR and SC were re-united as VfR Schlesien 1897 Breslau. The club was lost in 1945 in the aftermath of World War II.

Today, a leading Polish football and basketball club bears the name Śląsk Wrocław, the Polish-language equivalent to Schlesien Breslau. Founded in 1946, it is not related to the earlier German football club.

== Honours ==
SC Schlesien Breslau

- Verband Breslauer Ballspiel-Vereine (Breslau Football League) champions: 1904, 1905, 1906, 1907
- Südostdeutscher Fussball Verband (Southeast German Football League) champions: 1906, 1907

VfR 1897 Breslau

- Verband Breslauer Ballspiel-Vereine (Breslau Football League) champions: 1908, 1909, 1910
- Südostdeutscher Fussball Verband (Southeast German Football League) champions: 1908
