= Paul Hunder =

German footballer

Personal information
- Date of birth: 12 January 1884
- Date of death: 9 May 1948 (aged 64)
- Position: Midfielder

Senior career*
Years	Team	Apps	(Gls)
- BFC Viktoria 1889

International career
1909–1911	Germany	8	(0)
- * Club domestic league appearances and goals

Paul Hunder (12 January 1884 – 9 May 1948) was a German international footballer.
