= Helmut Röpnack =

German footballer

Personal information
- Date of birth: 23 September 1884
- Place of birth: Läsikow, Ruppin, Germany
- Date of death: 19 August 1935 (aged 50)
- Positions: Inside forward; defender

International career
Years	Team	Apps	(Gls)
1912	Germany	10	

Hellmuth Adolph August "Helmut" Röpnack (23 September 1884 in Läsikow, Ruppin – 19 August 1935) was a German amateur footballer who played as an inside forward and defender, competing in the 1912 Summer Olympics.

== International career ==
He was a member of the German Olympic squad and played one match in the main tournament as well as one match in the consolation tournament. Overall he won ten caps but couldn't secure a win with the DFB in these matches.
