= BFC Viktoria 1889 =

Former German football club

- Full name: Berliner Fußball-Club Viktoria 1889 e.V.
- Nicknames: Die Himmelblauen (the Sky-Blues), Tempelhofer Löwen (Tempelhof Lions)
- Founded: 6 June 1889
- Dissolved: 2013 (merged into FC Viktoria 1889 Berlin)
- Ground: Friedrich-Ebert-Stadion
- Capacity: 12,000
- 2012–13: NOFV-Oberliga Nord, 1st
Home colours	Away colours

Berliner Fußball-Club Viktoria 1889 was a German sports club based in the Tempelhof district of Berlin. Football, rugby, and cricket came to continental Europe in the late 19th century, and these "English games" became immediately popular in many countries. Viktoria was the oldest club in Germany that had teams playing both football and cricket. It was one of the founding members of the German Football Association (DFB) in Leipzig in 1900. The club merged with Lichterfelder FC in 2013 and has continued as FC Viktoria 1889 Berlin.

== History ==
=== Early success ===
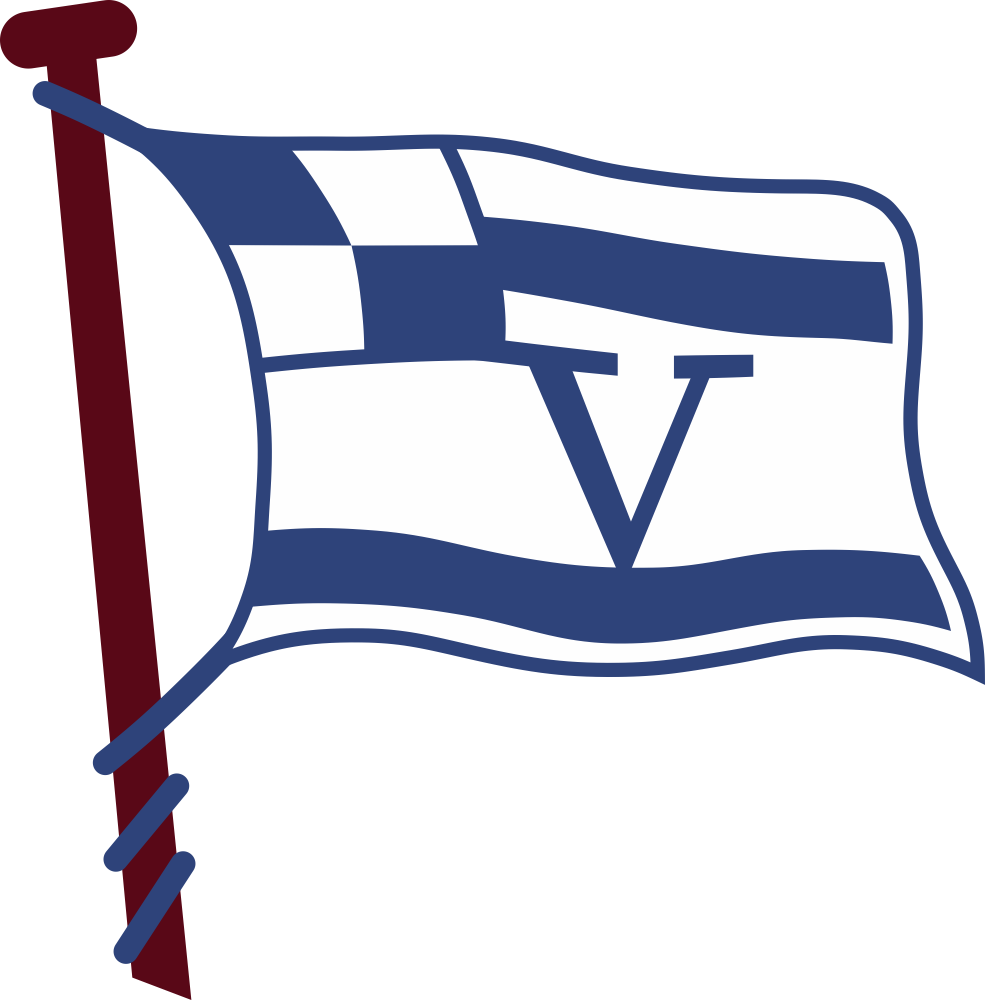
Early logo of BTuFC Viktoria Berlin

Viktoria Berlin was one of the first football clubs in Berlin. The club was established as Berliner Thorball- und Fußballclub Viktoria von 1889 on 6 June 1889. The team enjoyed almost immediate success and claimed the city championship in five consecutive seasons from 1893 to 1897. Viktoria Berlin then went on to become a presence on the national championship. The team appeared in the German championship final for three years in a row from 1907 to 1909 and became German champions in 1908. Viktoria Berlin captured a second national title in 1911 and continued to enjoy success in city league until the end of World War I. Viktoria Berlin earned uneven results in the early 1920s before settling firmly into the Oberliga Berlin-Brandenburg.

=== Play in the Third Reich ===
The club went on to play as Berliner FC Viktoria 89 in the Gauliga Berlin-Brandenburg, one of sixteen premier level divisions formed in the re-organization of German football under the Third Reich in 1933. The team captured the division title that year and advanced to the national playoffs, going out 1–2 to 1. FC Nürnberg in the semi-finals. Renamed BFC Viktoria 89 Berlin in 1936, the club played in the top-flight until being relegated in 1938, making a fleeting re-appearance as part of the combined wartime side (Kriegspielgemindeschaft) KSG Lufthansa/Viktoria 89 Berlin in the abbreviated 1944–45 season. Like most other organizations in Germany, including sports and football clubs, the club was dissolved by occupying Allied authorities at the end of World War II as part of the process of de-Nazification.

=== Postwar football ===
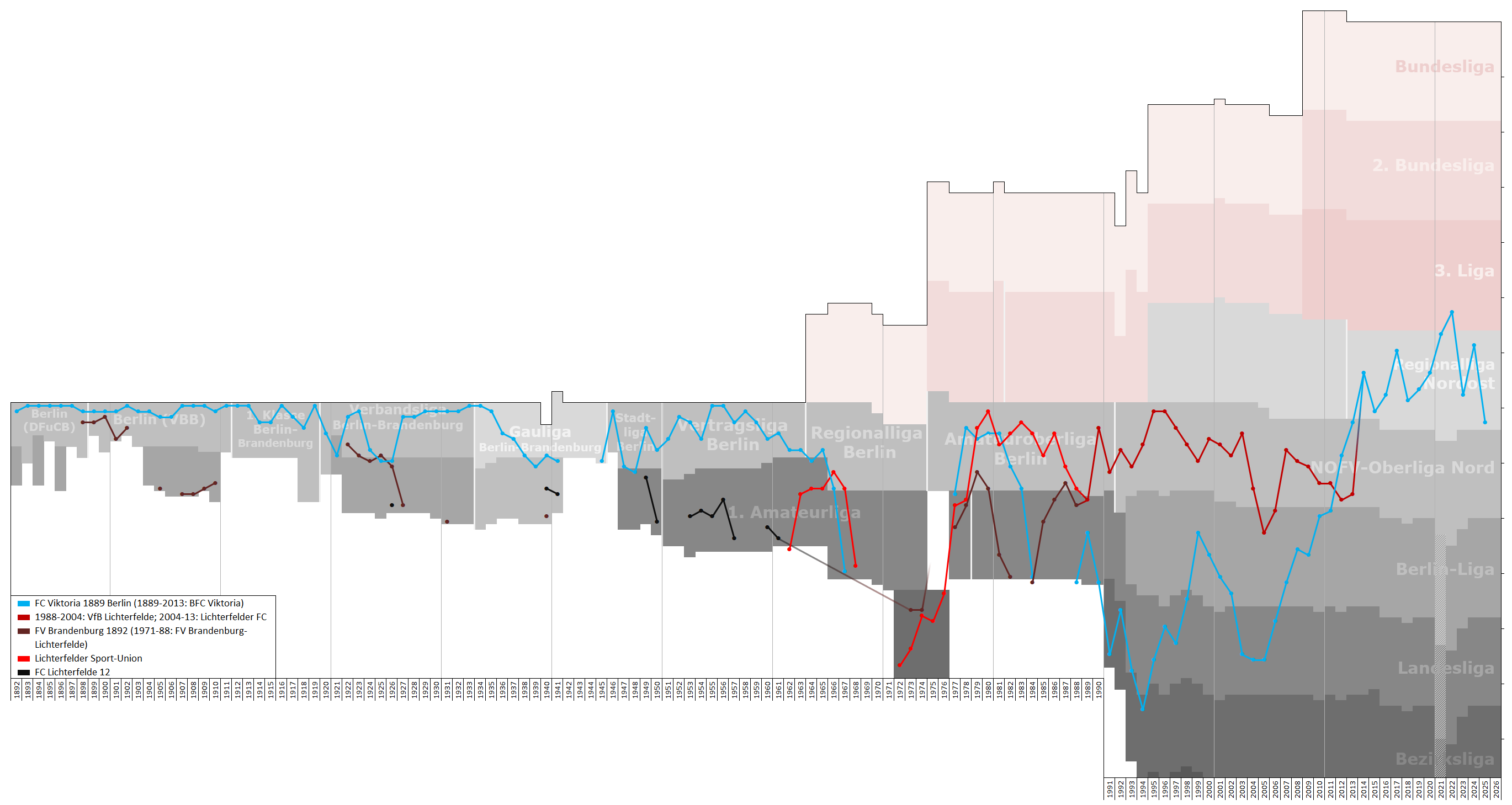
Historical chart of Viktoria league performance

The club was re-established in late 1945 as SG Tempelhof and re-claimed their pre-war identity as BFC Viktoria 89 Berlin on 12 July 1947. They played from the late 1940s, through the 1950s, and into the early 1960s in the Oberliga Berlin, affiliated with football in the western half of the now divided country. Viktoria claimed the division championship in 1955 and 1956, but were unable to advance in the national playoff rounds in either year. The Oberliga Berlin was relatively weak and generally performed poorly against top-flight teams from other divisions in western Germany. When the Bundesliga, Germany's new professional league, was formed in 1963, only a single place was held open among the sixteen teams selected to the new circuit for a side from Berlin. While the city's teams were not as competitive as others in the country, it was felt to be an important gesture in the Cold War era to represent the divided capital in the newly established league: the selection went to Hertha BSC.

Through the 60s, the club suffered through a series of financial problems caused in part by the division and isolation of Berlin after the construction of the Berlin Wall, and by simple mismanagement. Viktoria survived and later played in the fifth tier NOFV-Oberliga Nord.

In 2013 the club merged with Lichterfelder FC to form a new club, FC Viktoria 1889 Berlin.

== Cricket ==
Viktoria had a long cricket tradition and had been prominent in the growth and development of the game both in Germany and Europe.

The club won its last city title in 2003 and advanced as far as the semi-final round of the national championship in 2005. Viktoria's cricketers played in the Cricket Bundesliga while a second side played in the 2. Cricket-Bundesliga. The club also fielded a team in the Women's Cricket Bundesliga.

== Trivia ==
- Thorball or Torball was a German word in use in the 1890s and early 1900s for the sport of cricket. Several early clubs playing the new "English" games of football, rugby, and cricket incorporated it into their name. The term never caught on and did not enter into common usage, soon being abandoned by sports clubs. Today torball may refer to a form of football played by the blind or vision-impaired.

== Honours ==
In 1894, the Deutscher Fußball- und Cricketbund (German Football and Cricket League), a predecessor of the German Football Association, organized a national final. Viktoria and FC Hanau 93 were slated to contest the country's championship in Berlin, but Hanau could not afford to make the trip and thus forfeited the match, leaving Viktoria national football champions. In 2007 (113 years later) the match was finally played after enthusiastic support from the President of the German Football Federation (DFB), Theo Zwanziger. The first leg was won by Viktoria 3–0 and the second leg on 28 July ended as a draw at 1–1. The final was played with the heavy leather balls used in the late 19th century.

=== Football ===
==== Domestic ====
- German Champions
  - Winners: (2) 1894 (unofficial)^{1}, 1908, 1911
  - Runners-up: (2) 1907, 1909

==== Regional ====
- Berlin/Brandenburg Champions (–1933)
  - Winners: (13) 1893^{2}, 1894^{2}, 1895^{2}, 1896^{2}, 1897^{2}, 1902^{3}, 1907^{3}, 1908^{3}, 1909^{3}, 1911^{3}, 1913^{4}, 1916^{5}, 1919^{5}
  - Runners-up: (10) 1892^{2}, 1898^{2}, 1899^{3}, 1900^{3}, 1901^{3}, 1903^{3}, 1904^{3}, 1910^{3}, 1912^{4}, 1933^{6},
- Oberliga Berlin
  - Winners: (2) 1955, 1956
  - Runners-up: 1958
- Gauliga Berlin-Brandenburg
  - Winners: 1934
  - Runners-up: 1935
- Amateur-Oberliga Berlin (II)
  - Winners: 1948, 1964
- NOFV-Oberliga Nord (V)
  - Winners: 2013
- Berlin-Liga (VI)
  - Winners: 2011
- Berliner Landespokal (Tiers III–VII)
  - Winners: (6) 1907, 1908, 1909, 1926, 1927, 1953
  - Runners-up: 1929

Note 1: Championship organized by Deutscher Fussball- und Cricket-Bund (DFuCB). The actual German Football Association was founded only in 1900.
Note 2: Competition organized by football association Deutscher Fußball- und Cricket Bund (DFuCB).
Note 3: Competition organized by football association Verband Deutscher Ballspielvereine (VDB)/Verband Berliner Ballspielvereine (VBB)
Note 4: Competition organized by football association Verband Brandenburgischer Ballspielvereine (VBB)
Note 5: VBB-Verbandsliga, organized by football association Verband Brandenburgischer Ballspielvereine (VBB)
Note 6: VBB-Oberliga organized by football association Verband Brandenburgischer Ballspielvereine (VBB)

=== Cricket ===
- German men's championship
  - Winners: (21) 1896, 1897, 1898, 1899, 1909, 1914, 1915, 1916, 1918, 1921, 1922, 1923, 1925, 1952, 1953, 1954, 1955, 1956, 1957, 1958, 1959
- German women's championship:
  - Winners: 2006
