= Bullock (surname) =

Bullock is an English surname. Notable people with the surname include:

== A–L ==
- Bullock family
- Alan Bullock (1914–2004), British historian and academic
- Albert Bullock (1884–1951), English footballer
- Alexander H. Bullock (1816–1882), governor of Massachusetts from 1866 to 1868
- Anna Mae Bullock (1939–2023), birth name of Tina Turner, American singer, dancer and entertainer
- Arthur Bullock (1909–1997), English professional footballer
- Belden Bullock (born 1957), American jazz double-bassist
- Bob Bullock (1929–1999), American politician from Texas
- Carrie E. Bullock (1887–1962), African American nurse
- Charleigh Bullock (born 2010), American gymnast
- Charles J. Bullock (1869–1941), American economist, professor at Harvard
- Charles S. Bullock III (born 1942), American political scientist
- Chick Bullock, American jazz and dance band vocalist
- Corey Bullock (born 2001), American football player
- Craig Anthony Bullock, known as DJ Homicide
- Dan Bullock (1953–1969), United States Marine
- Darren Bullock (born 1969), former English footballer
- Emily Valentine Bullock, New Zealand artist
- Ernest Bullock (1890–1979), English organist, composer, and educator
- Frederick or Fred Bullock, several people
- George Bullock (disambiguation), several people; i.a.:
  - George Bullock (professor) (c. 1521 – 1572), English Catholic theologian
  - George Bullock (sculptor) (1777–1818), English sculptor and furniture maker
- Geoff Bullock (born 1956), Australian Pentecostal pastor and songwriter
- Gesine Bullock-Prado (born 1970), American chef, author, attorney, sister of Sandra Bullock
- Guy Bullock (1887–1956), diplomat and mountaineer
- Harvey Bullock (character), fictional character from Batman
- Harvey Bullock (writer) (1921–2006), American screenwriter
- Heather E. Bullock, American social psychologist
- Hiram Bullock (1955–2008), American jazz-funk guitarist
- Jim J. Bullock (born 1955), American actor
- Jeffrey Bullock (born 1959), American university president
- Jeffrey W. Bullock, American politician
- Jimmy Bullock (1902–1977), English footballer
- John Bullock (bishop) (died 1439), Augustinian canon and prelate
- Julia Bullock (born 1987), American operatic soprano
- Kentrel Bullock (born 2002), American football player
- Lee Bullock (born 1981), English footballer
- Louis Bullock (born 1976), American basketball player

== M–Z ==
- Martha Bullock (1851–1939), wife of Seth Bullock
- Martin Bullock (born 1975), English footballer
- Matthew Bullock, African-American man who was charged with intent to murder without evidence and fled to Canada
- Matthew Bullock (footballer) (born 1980), retired English footballer
- Michele Bullock (born 1962/1963), Australian economist
- Mickey Bullock (1946–2024), English footballer
- Mike Bullock, American comics artist
- Norman Bullock (1900–1970), English footballer and football manager
- Osmund Bullock (born 1951), English art historian and actor
- Peter Bullock (cricketer) (1925–1997), English cricketer
- Peter Bullock (scientist) (1937–2008), soil scientist and Nobel Peace Prize winner
- Peter Bullock (footballer) (born 1941), English footballer
- Randy Bullock (born 1989), American football placekicker
- Red Bullock (1911–1988), Major League Baseball pitcher
- Reggie Bullock (born 1991), American basketball player
- Richard Bullock (1847–1921), Cornish sharpshooter, also known as Deadwood Dick
- Robert Bullock (1826–1905), American politician
- Rufus Brown Bullock (1834–1907), Reconstruction era governor of Georgia
- Sandra Bullock (born 1964), American actress
- S. Scott Bullock (born 1956), American actor
- Seth Bullock (1849–1919), United States marshal
- Simon Bullock (born 1962), English footballer
- Steve Bullock (disambiguation), several people
- Susan Bullock (born 1958), British soprano
- Theodore Holmes Bullock (1915–2005), American neurologist
- Théodore-Lafleur Bullock (1901–1972), Canadian serviceman
- Thomas Bullock (Mormon) (1816–1886), English Mormon pioneer
- Tony Bullock (born 1972), English footballer
- Walter Bullock (1907–1953), American song composer
- William Bullock (actor), English actor
- William Bullock (collector), English traveller, naturalist and antiquarian
- William Bullock (inventor), American who invented the web rotary printing press
- William Henry Bullock, U.S. Roman Catholic churchman
- Wynn Bullock, American photographer

== See also ==
- Daniel Bullocks (born 1983), American football player
- Josh Bullocks (born 1983), American football player
