= Hiley =

Hiley is a name. Notable people with the surname include:

- Basil Hiley (born 1935), British quantum physicist
- David Hiley (born 1947), English musicologist
- E. H. Hiley (1870–1943), British railways engineer
- Joseph Hiley (1902–1989), British politician
- Scott Hiley (born 1968), English footballer
- Thomas Hiley (1905–1990), Australian politician
- Wilfrid Edward Hiley (1886–1961), British forester and forest pathologist

== See also ==
- Hiley Bamsey (1916–1943), English footballer
