= George Bullock =

George Bullock may refer to:

- George Bullock (professor) (c. 1521–1572), English theologian
- George Bullock (sculptor) (c. 1777–1818), English sculptor
- George Bullock (British Army officer) (1851–1926), British Army general
- George Bullock (footballer) (1916–1943), English footballer
