= Harry Goslin =

English footballer

Personal information
- Date of birth: 9 November 1909
- Place of birth: Willington, County Durham, England
- Date of death: 18 December 1943 (aged 34)
- Place of death: Sangro, Italy
- Position: Defender

Senior career*
Years	Team	Apps	(Gls)
1930–1939	Bolton Wanderers	306	(23)
- * Club domestic league appearances and goals

Henry Goslin MC, (9 November 1909 – 18 December 1943) was an English footballer who played as a defender for Bolton Wanderers for the whole of his professional career.

Born in Willington, Durham, he was signed from Nottingham amateur football team Boots Athletic in 1930 for the fee of £25. His debut was inauspicious, playing in the 7–2 defeat by Liverpool. He suffered both relegation and promotion with the club, and in 1936 was made captain of the team by manager Charles Foweraker. In total he played 306 games for the club, scoring 23 times.

On 8 April 1939, with World War II seemingly inevitable, Goslin stood in front of a microphone in the middle of Burnden Park and told the assembled crowd that after the game the Bolton team would make their way to the local Territorial Army hall to sign up. When Germany invaded Poland, the cessation of official football games was immediate but local games were allowed and, subject to leave, Goslin played in four games for Bolton as well as guesting for Chelsea and Norwich City when posted temporarily in the south of England and East Anglia. He was also selected for an unofficial international for England against Scotland.

The majority of the team were posted to the 53rd (Bolton) Field Regiment, Royal Artillery, and Goslin, now promoted to sergeant, and the other players saw action in France leading up to the withdrawals at Dunkirk. Back in England Goslin was commissioned Lieutenant for his actions in the withdrawal. The regiment were sent to East Anglia to patrol potential enemy landing sites and Goslin was again selected for England, again to play Scotland, twice, as well as Wales.

In the summer of 1942 the regiment set sail for Egypt and took part in the defence of Alam el Halfa. With victory in the campaign, the regiment were sent to Kirkurk and then Kifri, where various members of the Bolton team, including Goslin, played for the British Army against the Polish Army in a 4–2 victory.

The 53rd Regiment then joined in the invasion of Italy, making their way from Taranto to Foggia without much trouble. They then took part in the battle to take control of the River Sangro crossing. Fighting took place for over a month and a number of Goslin's fellow Bolton players were removed. On 14 December 1943, a mortar bomb exploded in the tree under which Goslin had made his observation point. He was hit in the back by shrapnel and wood and mortally wounded although he fought for life for a few more days. He left a wife and two children, one of whom, his son Bob, became a senior figure in the Bolton police as well as in South Yorkshire and Cambridgeshire. He died in August 2008.

As a mark of respect, the Bolton players lined up before the centre stand of Burnden Park for a minute's silence and wearing black armbands before their New Year's Day War League game. Goslin and Walter Sidebottom were the only team members to die during the war. Goslin is buried at the Sangro River War Cemetery.

== See also ==
- List of footballers killed during World War II
