= Joseph Rooney =

Joseph Rooney may refer to:

- Joseph Rooney (priest) (died 1857), Irish missionary priest
- Joseph Ó Ruanaidh, né Joseph Rooney, author in the field of digital watermarking
- Joe Rooney (born 1963), Irish actor and comedian
- Joe Rooney (American football) (1898–1979), football player from Ottawa, Ontario
- Joe Rooney (footballer) (1917–1941), English footballer
- Joe Don Rooney (born 1975), musician
- Joey Rooney, fictional character
