= Associazione Calcio Sampierdarenese =

Italian association football club

AC Sampierdarenese
- Full name: Associazione Calcio Sampierdarenese
- Short name: Sampierdarenese
- Founded: 19 March 1899; 127 years ago
- Dissolved: 12 August 1946 to become UC Sampdoria
- Ground: Stadio di Villa Scassi (1920–1927); Stadio del Littorio (1927–1945); Stadio Luigi Ferraris (1945–1946)
Home colours	Away colours

Associazione Calcio Sampierdarenese, commonly known as Sampierdarenese, was an Italian professional football club from Genoa, Italy. The club was named after Sampierdarena, a populous area of Genoa and an autonomous town until 1926. Founded in 1899 as the Football section of Società Ginnastica Comunale Sampierdarenese, the club was active up to 1946 when it merged with Associazione Calcio Andrea Doria under the name of Sampdoria.

== Early years: 1899–1927 ==
The Football section of Società Ginnastica Sampierdarenese was founded on 19 March 1899 by former members of Liguria Foot Ball Club. The initial kit was white with a black horizontal stripe.

Sampierdarenese took part in the Ligurian round of the 1900 Italian Football Championship, playing one single match against local rival Genoa CFC. Sampierdarenese lost 7 to 0 after playing most of the match with ten players due to the injury occurred to Ferdinando Arnier. This single match was the only appearance of Sampierdarenese before First World War.

After the war Sampierdarenese finally began to compete in the Italian Championship replacing another club from Bolzaneto, then an independent town in the province of Genoa, called Associazione del Calcio Ligure. Thus, during the 1919–20 edition Sampierdarenese and Andrea Doria met in the championship for the first time. Doria won the first-leg game (4–1 and 1–1) and finished second after Genoa in the Liguria group, qualifying for the National Round.

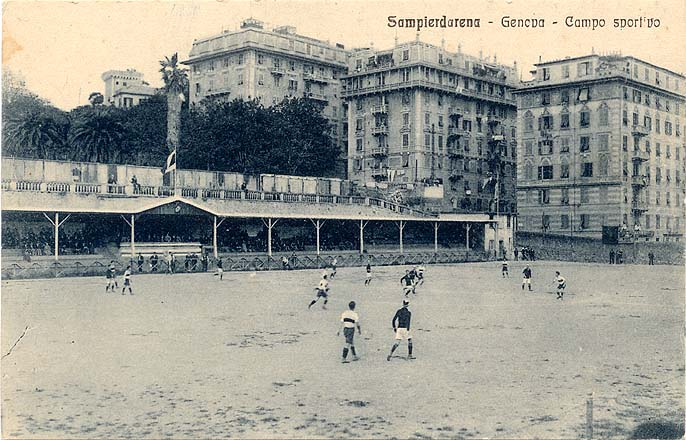
The Villa Scassi Stadium

For the 1921–22 season the Italian top league was split into two competitions, one run by the Italian Football Federation and a second one organized by the secessionist Italian Football Confederation. Sampierdarenese joined the IFF tournament, while Andrea Doria and Genoa signed up for the one organized by the Confederation. Sampierdarenese won the Liguria section and then went on to the semi-finals, finishing top out of three clubs and thus reaching the final against Novese. Both legs of the final ended in 0–0 draws, thus a repetition match was played in Cremona on 21 May 1922. The match went into extra time with Novese eventually winning the tie (and the Championship) 2–1.

During the 1922–23 Prima Divisione season Sampierdarenese played in group A and finished in third place after Pro Vercelli and Torino. The next seasons 1923–24 and 1924–25 where relatively uneventful for Sampierdarenese, who finished in the lower part of the table but managed to avoid relegation. In 1925–26 Sampierdarenese and Genoa both played in Group B. The two derbys were won by Genoa (2–3 and 3–1).

A process of unification of the many professional football teams in Italy was started by the Mussolini government in this period. Particularly in 1927 multiple smaller clubs where merged into one all over the country. Among many other similar examples, three teams based in Rome merged and became AS Roma. Similarly, at the end of the 1926–27 season Sampierdarenese and Andrea Doria merged for the first time giving birth to Associazione Calcio La Dominante, later known as Foot Ball Club Liguria.

== From 1931 to 1940 ==
La Dominante lived a short life, having played just four championships from 1927 to 1931, and was not particularly successful. Sampierdarenese reverted to its previous name in 1931, and Andrea Doria was recreated as a separate club.

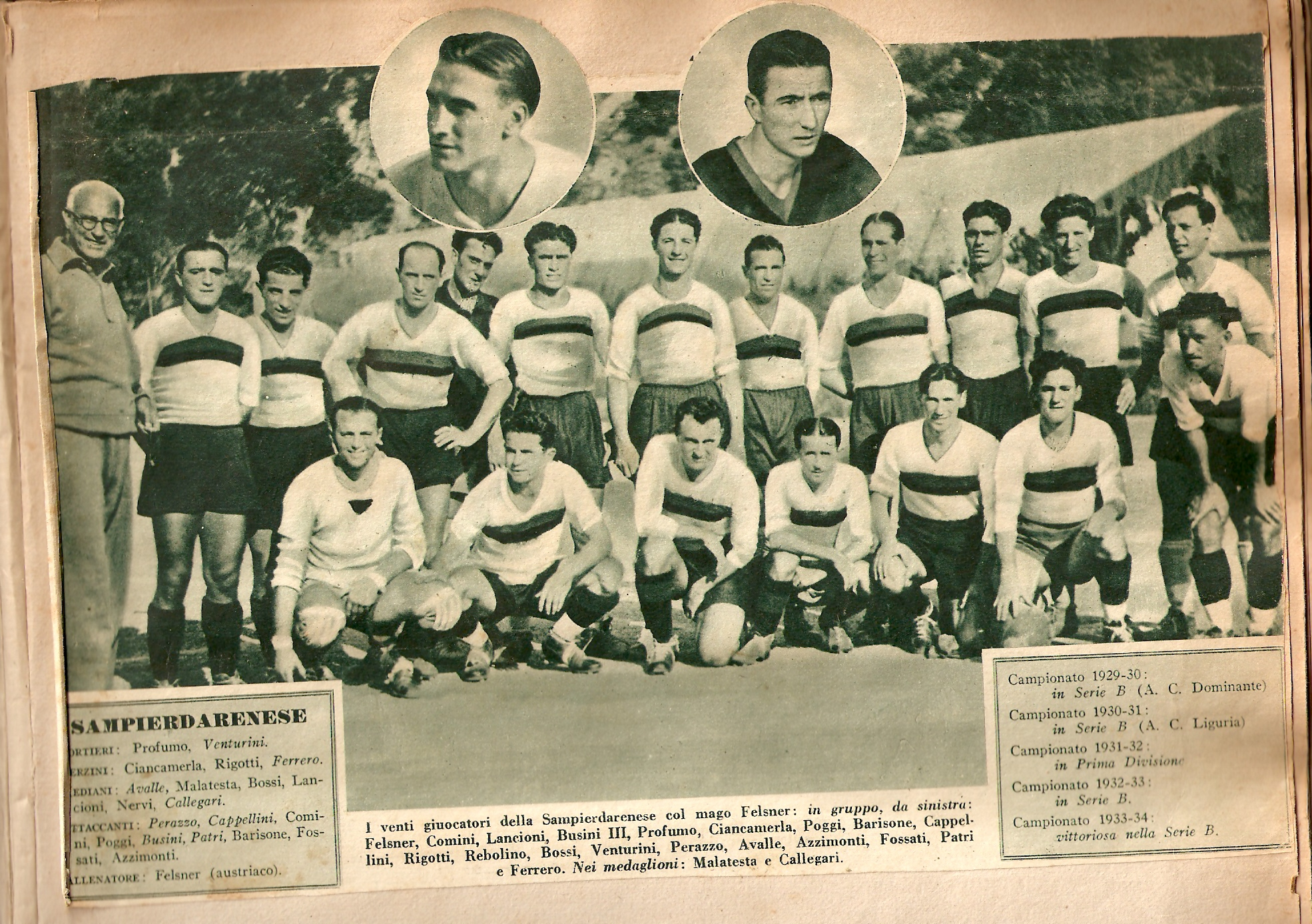
Sampierdarenese in 1934–1935

In the span of just a few years Sampierdarenese then climbed up from Prima Divisione to Serie B and finally Serie A. Ending up second in the Girone D of the 1931–32 Prima Divisione, they got promoted to Serie B. After the uneventful 1932–33 Serie B season, the team proceeded to win the 1933–34 Serie B championship and were promoted into Serie A for the first time.

Sampierdarenese were the only team representing the city of Genoa in the 1934–35 Serie A season given that local rivals Genova 1893 suffered relegation the year before and thus competed in Serie B. Sampierdarenese ended their first Serie A season in 13th place, avoiding relegation.

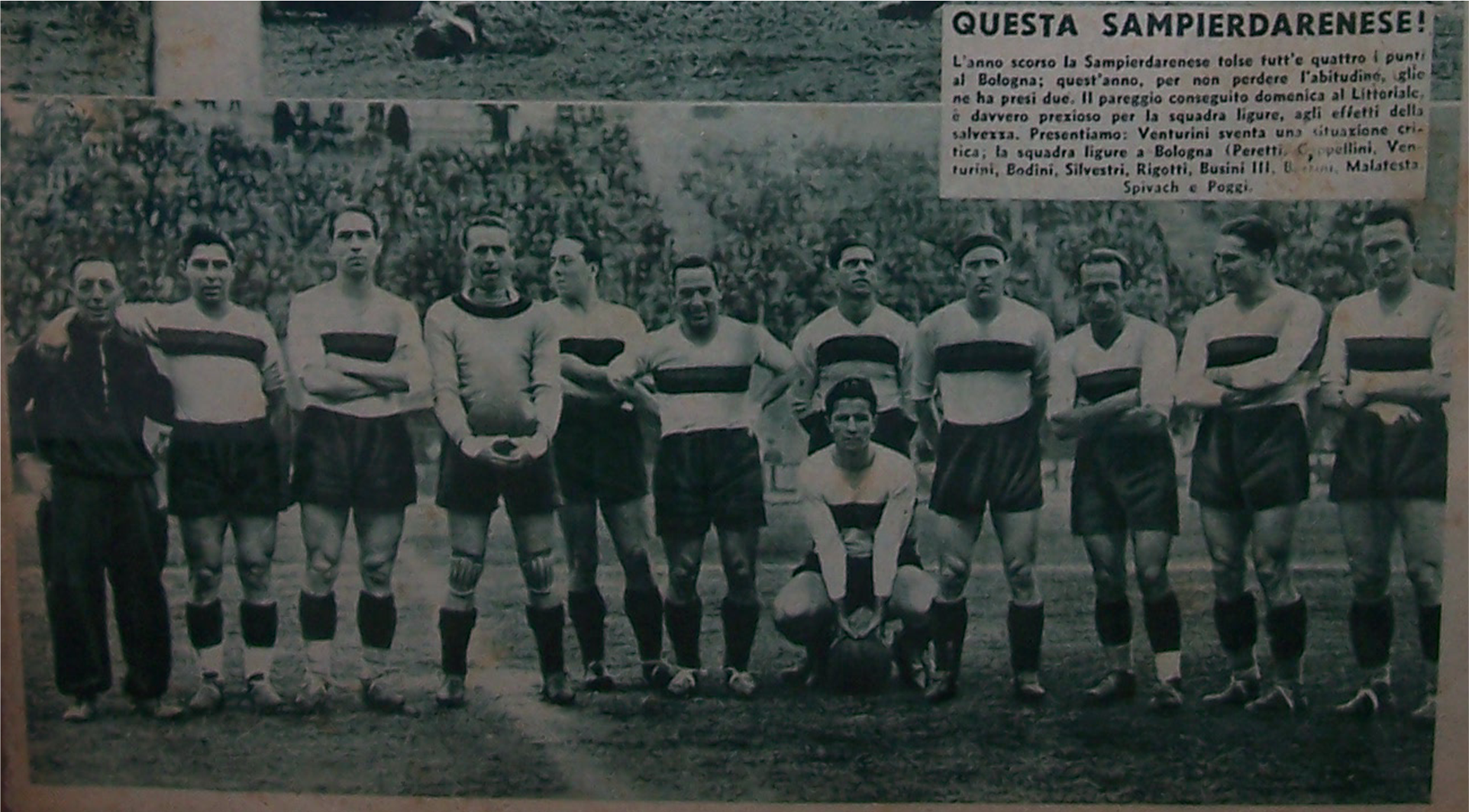
Sampierdarenese in 1936

The next two years, 1935–36 and 1936–37 the team also ended the championship in the second half of the table and once again managed to avoid relegation. During season 1936-37 Sampierdarenese was managed by Hungarian coach István Mészáros and avoided the drop to Serie B thanks to a 2-0 away victory against Napoli, secured in the very last match.

A new merger occurred during the 1937-38 season. This time Sampierdarenese was joined to Corniglianese and Rivarolese, under the name Associazione Calcio Liguria. Despite the new name, not a lot else changed given that the team structure, stadium, and even the white-red-black kit of Sampierdarenese stayed the same. The club was first managed by Adolfo Baloncieri and had a fairly uneventful initial season, securing 11th place in 1937-38. The 1938-39 season went even better, with a final 6th place and a victory in both derbies against Genova for 1-0.

== War times: 1940–1946 ==
Liguria was relegated to Serie B in 1940. Baloncieri left the team after a dispute with president Mojo about Luigi Cassano. The Hungarian Ferenc Hirzer was chosen to manage the team, and replaced during the season by Pietro Colombati. Colombati however did not manage to rescue the bad season, at the end of which Liguria was second-to-last and relegated. Liguria won the 1940–41 Serie B tournament and was promoted to Serie A with the country at war.

The 1941-42 Serie A season was the second during World War II and saw Liguria ending up in 11th place. During the 1942-43, the last Serie A championship before a two-years break due to the war, Liguria was relegated again ending up last. After the Armistice of Cassibile and the establishment of the Gothic Line, the country was split in two. Liguria played the 1944 Campionato Alta Italia, won both derbies and finished in 4th place. The right-back Pietro Tabor was killed in July 1944 by one of the American bombings of Genoa.

Liguria participated in their final tournament, the Coppa Città di Genova, in 1945 before reverting to the original name: Sampierdarenese. The team played in the 1945–46 Italian Football Championship, along with Andrea Doria and Genoa CFC, also back to their original name.

Sampierdarenese ended the season with a 1-1 draw against Venezia on April 14, 1946: formerly hugely funded by the fascist regime, Sampierdarenese was suffering a lack of money in post-war Italy. Andrea Doria was very rich instead, but it had not a Serie A license. On August 12, Sampierdarenese and Andrea Doria consequently merged again to form Unione Calcio Sampdoria, that continued the story of Sampierdarenese under a new form.
