= Reg Anderson (footballer) =

English footballer

Personal information
- Full name: Reginald Stephen Anderson
- Date of birth: 13 September 1916
- Place of birth: Peckham, England
- Date of death: 24 February 1942 (aged 25)
- Place of death: Sylt, Nazi Germany
- Position: Forward

Senior career*
Years	Team	Apps	(Gls)
1934–1938	Dulwich Hamlet		
1938–1939	Cardiff City	2	(1)
1939–1940	Dulwich Hamlet		

International career
1938–1939	England Amateur	3	(3)
- * Club domestic league appearances and goals

Reginald Stephen Anderson (13 September 1916 – 24 February 1942) was an English professional footballer. After beginning his career with amateur side Dulwich Hamlet, he joined Cardiff City in 1938 and made two appearances in The Football League. He also represented England at amateur level, scoring a hat-trick on his debut in 1938.

== Early life ==
Anderson was born in Peckham in 1916 to William Thomas Anderson and Ellen Leete Anderson (née Strickland). He grew up in Dulwich, attending Wilson's School. He later became a teacher.

== Career ==
After playing football for his local school, he joined Dulwich Hamlet at the age of eighteen in 1934. Two years later, he made his debut for the club's first team and quickly established himself in the squad, winning the FA Amateur Cup final 2–0 against Leyton in 1937. His form for Dulwich led to him being called up to the England national amateur football team, scoring a hat-trick in his first match during an 8–2 victory over Wales playing alongside Dulwich teammate William Parr. He made two further appearances for the side in the following year, both in matches against Scotland, without scoring.

His performances for the England amateur side attracted attention from several Football League clubs and he eventually joined Third Division South side Cardiff City. He made his professional debut on 15 April 1939 in a match against Notts County. Two days later, he played in the reverse fixture against County, scoring once during a 4–1 victory for Cardiff. Following the outbreak of World War II, the Football League was suspended and Anderson was briefly retained as an amateur with Cardiff before rejoining Dulwich.

== World War II ==
Anderson enlisted with the Royal Air Force Volunteer Reserve, being assigned to 106 squadron as a Sergeant Observer. On the night of 23 February 1942, the Handley Page Hampden bomber aircraft that Anderson was serving on was one of 23 aircraft that took part in a minelaying "gardening" operation over "Eglatine" (the Heligoland approaches) departing from RAF Coningsby. The flight was his fifth mission on active duty. Anderson's aircraft was shot down over the Heligoland Bight by flak from either anti-aircraft batteries or a Kriegsmarine flak ship and all four crew members were killed when the plane crashed into dunes at Sylt. His remains were buried in Kiel War Cemetery.
