= August Klingler =

German footballer

Personal information
- Date of birth: 24 February 1918
- Date of death: 23 November 1944 (aged 26)
- Position: Forward

Senior career*
Years	Team	Apps	(Gls)
- FV Daxlanden

International career
1942	Germany	5	(6)
- * Club domestic league appearances and goals

August Klingler (24 February 1918 – 23 November 1944) was a German international footballer.

He scored six goals in only five matches for the Germany national team in the midst of the Second World War. He scored three goals in Germany's final international during World War II in November 1942, but was killed on the Eastern Front in 1944.

== See also ==
- List of footballers killed during World War II
