= Joe Coen =

Scottish footballer

Personal information
- Date of birth: 1911
- Place of birth: Glasgow, Scotland
- Date of death: 15 October 1941 (aged 29–30)
- Place of death: RAF Cranwell, Cranwell, Lincolnshire, England
- Height: 5 ft 11 in (1.80 m)
- Position: Goalkeeper

Youth career
- Mosspark Amateurs
- Clydeholm

Senior career*
Years	Team	Apps	(Gls)
1930–1931	Clydebank	23	(0)
1931–1932	Celtic	3	(0)
1932	→ Stenhousemuir (loan)	6	(0)
1932–1933	Guildford Town		
1933–1934	Bournemouth & Boscombe Athletic		
1934–1939	Luton Town		
- * Club domestic league appearances and goals

Joseph Leo Coen (1911 – 15 October 1941) was a Scottish professional footballer who played for Clydebank, Celtic and Luton Town as a goalkeeper. Born in Glasgow, he died during the Second World War.

== Military career ==
At the start of World War II, Coen joined the Royal Air Force and trained to be a fighter pilot. He was killed on 15 October 1941, aged recordedly 29, in a mid-air collision whilst training at RAF Cranwell in Lincolnshire. Leading Aircraftman Coen, piloting an Airspeed Oxford, crashed into Leading Aircraftman James Yonge's Oxford, killing both instantly. He was buried in Holy Trinity Churchyard, Biscot, Luton, Bedfordshire.

== See also ==
- List of footballers killed during World War II
