= Steve Bullock =

Steve, Steven, or Stephen Bullock may refer to:

- Steve Bullock (British politician) (born 1953), first directly elected mayor of the London Borough of Lewisham
- Steve Bullock (American politician) (born 1966), 24th governor of Montana (2013–2021)
- Stephen Bullock (1735–1816), U.S. representative from Massachusetts (1797–1799)
- Steven Bullock (footballer) (born 1966), English association football player
