= Bill Isaac =

English footballer

Personal information
- Full name: William James Isaac
- Date of birth: Q3 1918
- Place of birth: Tynemouth, England
- Date of death: 14 April 1941 (aged 22)
- Place of death: Maidstone, England
- Position: Inside forward

Senior career*
| Years | Team | Apps | (Gls) |
| 1938–1939 | Newcastle United | 0 | (0) |
| 1939–1941 | Brighton & Hove Albion | 3 | (0) |
- * Club domestic league appearances and goals

William James Isaac (Q3 1918 – 14 April 1941) was an English professional footballer who played as an inside forward in the Football League for Brighton & Hove Albion.

== Personal life ==
Isaac enlisted in the British Army at the outbreak of the Second World War and served as an instructor in the Royal Artillery with the rank of bombardier. He took part in the Battle of France and was evacuated from Dunkirk, dying of meningitis in Maidstone on 14 April 1941. He was buried in Seghill (Holy Trinity) Churchyard.

== Career statistics ==
Appearances and goals by club, season and competition
| Club | Season | Division | League | | FA Cup | | Total | |
| Club | Season | Division | Apps | Goals | Apps | Goals | Apps | Goals |
|---|---|---|---|---|---|---|---|---|
| Brighton & Hove Albion | 1939–40 | Third Division South | 3 | 0 | 0 | 0 | 3 | 0 |
| Brighton & Hove Albion | 1939–40 | League South B | 1 | 1 | 0 | 0 | 1 | 1 |
| Brighton & Hove Albion | 1940–41 | South Division | 10 | 2 | 0 | 0 | 10 | 2 |
| Career total | | | 14 | 3 | 0 | 0 | 14 | 3 |
