= Alfred Keeling =

English footballer

Alfred John Keeling
Personal information
- Date of birth: 14 December 1920
- Place of birth: Bradford, England
- Date of death: 1 December 1942 (aged 21)
- Place of death: Bay of Biscay
- Position: Forward

Youth career
- Carlton Street School
- Sedbergh
- East Bierley
- 1936–1937: Bradford Park Avenue

Senior career*
Years	Team	Apps	(Gls)
1937–1939	Bradford Park Avenue	1	(0)
1939	Portsmouth	0	(0)
1939–1942	Manchester City	0	(0)
1939–1940	→ Bradford City (war guest)	5	(2)
1940	→ Manchester City (war guest)	1	(0)
1940	→ Bradford Park Avenue (war guest)	2	(0)
Total		9	(2)
- * Club domestic league appearances and goals

Alfred John Keeling (14 December 1920 – 1 December 1942) was an English professional footballer who played as a forward.

== Career ==
Keeling was born in Bradford, and spent his early career with Carlton Street School, Sedbergh and East Bierley. He joined Bradford Park Avenue in 1936, playing with the reserves before signing a professional contract on 14 December 1937, his seventeenth birthday. Pugh made his debut in the Football League for them on 26 March 1938, and after a brief spell with Portsmouth, he joined Manchester City in May 1939. Pugh's career was interrupted by World War Two, and he played as a war guest for Bradford City, Manchester City and Bradford Park Avenue.

Keeling later joined the Royal Air Force and was shot down over the Bay of Biscay on 1 December 1942.
