= Grenville Roberts =

English footballer

Personal information
- Full name: Samuel Grenville Roberts
- Date of birth: 16 August 1919
- Place of birth: Blackwell, England
- Date of death: 3 June 1940 (aged 20)
- Place of death: Dunkirk, France
- Position: Inside forward

Senior career*
Years	Team	Apps	(Gls)
1934	Huthwaite Swifts		
1935	Huthwaite CWS		
- Huthwaite Colliery
1937–1939	Nottingham Forest	6	(0)
- * Club domestic league appearances and goals

Samuel Grenville Roberts (also known as Samuel Granville Roberts, 16 August 1919 – 3 June 1940) was an English professional footballer who played as a inside forward in the Football League for Nottingham Forest.

== Personal life ==
Roberts served in the British Army as a private in the 2nd/5th Battalion of the West Yorkshire Regiment, part of the 46th Infantry Division, during the Second World War. He died of wounds following a strafing attack by German Stukas at Dunkirk on 3 June 1940. Roberts is commemorated at the Dunkirk Memorial.

== Career statistics ==
Appearances and goals by club, season and competition
Club	Season	League			FA Cup		Total	
Club	Season	Division	Apps	Goals	Apps	Goals	Apps	Goals
Nottingham Forest	1937–38	Second Division	1	0	0	0	1	0
Nottingham Forest	1938–39	Second Division	5	0	0	0	5	0
Career total			6	0	0	0	6	0
