= Telesfor Banaszkiewicz =

Polish footballer (1908–1940)

Personal information
- Date of birth: 27 November 1908
- Place of birth: Poznań, German Empire
- Date of death: April 1940 (aged 31)
- Place of death: Katyn, Soviet Union
- Height: 1.80 m (5 ft 11 in)
- Position: Forward

Senior career*
Years	Team	Apps	(Gls)
1924–1930	Pogoń Poznań		
1930–1931	Warta Poznań		
1935	Warta Poznań		
- * Club domestic league appearances and goals

Telesfor Banaszkiewicz (27 November 1908 – April 1940) was a Polish professional footballer who played as a forward.

== Personal life ==
Banaszkiewicz graduated from the Poznań University of Economics and Business in 1935 and lived in Katowice. Since 1933, he served as a lieutenant in the 74th Infantry Regiment of the Polish Army. He was executed during the Katyn massacre as part of the Second World War.
