= Leonard Malik =

Polish footballer (1908–1945)

Personal information
- Date of birth: 25 October 1908
- Place of birth: Kattowitz, German Empire
- Date of death: 10 October 1945 (aged 36)
- Place of death: Mysłowice, Poland
- Height: 1.75 m (5 ft 9 in)
- Position: Forward

Senior career*
Years	Team	Apps	(Gls)
1923–1929	Pogoń Katowice		
1929–1933	Polonia Warsaw		
1934–1938	Proch Pionki		

International career
1930	Poland	1	(1)

Managerial career
- 1934–1938: Proch Pionki (player-manager)
- * Club domestic league appearances and goals

Leonard Malik (25 October 1908 – 10 October 1945) was a Polish footballer who played as a forward. He earned one cap for the Poland national team in 1930.

== Personal life ==
Malik's cousin Richard was also a footballer, who played for Germany.

Malik, who briefly served in the Polish Army in 1929, was an ethnic German of socialist views which caused him to be jailed at Bereza Kartuska Prison in 1938-39 as an opponent of the interwar Polish government. During the German occupation of Poland in the Second World War, Malik ran a casino for Wehrmacht personnel in Pionki. Accused of being a Gestapo informant, he was arrested by the Polish People's Republic and died in a forced labour camp on 10 October 1945.
