= Vladimir Vonog =

Soviet-Russian footballer (1899–1942)

Personal information
- Full name: Vladimir Donatovich Vonog
- Date of birth: 1 February 1899
- Place of birth: Saint Petersburg, Russia
- Date of death: 16 March 1942 (aged 43)
- Place of death: Leningrad, Russia, Soviet Union
- Height: 1.74 m (5 ft 8 1/2 in)
- Position: Central midfielder

Senior career*
Years	Team	Apps	(Gls)
1917–1923	Putilovskiy Kruzhok (Petrograd)		
1924	Spartak Moscow-Narvskiy Region A		
1925–1935	Krasny Putilovets		

International career
1922–28	Leningrad All-Star Team		
1923–25	RSFSR		
- * Club domestic league appearances and goals

Vladimir Donatovich Vonog (Russian: Владимир Донатович Воног, 1 February 1899 – 16 March 1942) was a Soviet-Russian international footballer, bandy player and referee.

He began his playing career in 1914 at the Putilovskiy Kruzhok in Petrograd. He played for the Petrograd-Leningrad clubs Putilovskiy Kruzhok (1917–1923), Spartak Moscow-Narvskiy (1924), and Krasny Putilovets (1925–1935). He played for the Petrograd-Leningrad All-Star teams from 1922 to 1928, and for the RSFSR national team from 1923 to 1925. He played in 3 friendlies for the RSFSR.

Vonog was part of the successful Krasny Putilovets tour of Germany in 1927, as well as the 1923 RSFSR national team tours in Scandinavia, Finland, Germany and Estonia.

He was known for being a very fit player. His passion and work ethic made him stand out in the game.

Aside from football, he was a good Bandy player, representing the Leningrad All-Stars (1924–36) and RSFSR national bandy team (1924–30). He was a player-coach at HK Avangard Leningrad from 1938 to 1941. Under his management, the team reached the finals of the 1939 Soviet Bandy Cup. In 1936 he made the list of the best players of the season.

He became an association football referee in the 1930s, refereeing 18 games in the Soviet Top League. He also taught in the National Government University of Physical Culture. He was an active organizer of physical culture at the Kirov Plant, and was the first in the USSR to introduce industrial gymnastics before the start of each work day.

He died during the Siege of Leningrad. Since 1952, the bandy players of the Kirov Plant have held a Cup tournament in his honor.

== Honours ==
- Leningrad Football Fall Championship winner, 1925.
- USSR Bandy Championship winner, 1928.
- USSR Bandy Championship runner-up, 1933.
- RSFSR champion: 1924, 1926–28.

=== Individual ===
- Honoured Master of Sport of the USSR (1934).
- 4th in the list of the top 44 Soviet players of the season (1928).
- List of the 22 best players of the Bandy Federation of the USSR (1936).
