= Colin Perry =

English footballer

Personal information
- Date of birth: 1916
- Place of birth: Kiveton Park, England
- Date of death: 28 November 1942 (aged 26)
- Place of death: Tobruk, Italian Libya
- Position: Winger

Senior career*
Years	Team	Apps	(Gls)
1932	Kiveton Park		
1933–1934	Sheffield United	0	(0)
1934–1935	Wolverhampton Wanderers	0	(0)
1935	Wrexham	0	(0)
1935–1936	Gainsborough Trinity		
1936–1939	Aston Villa	0	(0)
1939	Nottingham Forest	3	(2)
- * Club domestic league appearances and goals

Colin Perry (1916 – 28 November 1942) was an English professional footballer who played three games and scored two goals for Nottingham Forest in the 1939–40 season before competitive football was suspended due to the outbreak of the Second World War.

He also had been signed by Football League teams Sheffield United, Wolverhampton Wanderers, Wrexham and Aston Villa throughout the 1930s, however made no appearances for all.

He died during the Second World War during the Siege of Tobruk when serving as a driver in the Royal Army Service Corps.
