= Charles J. Bullock =

American politician

Charles Jesse Bullock
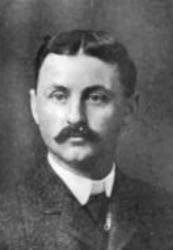
- Born: May 21, 1869; Boston, Massachusetts, U.S.
- Died: March 17, 1941 (aged 71); Hingham, Massachusetts, U.S.
- Education: Boston University; University of Wisconsin
- Occupation: Economist
- Employer: Harvard University

Charles Jesse Bullock (1869–1941) was an American economist. He was a professor of economics at Harvard University. He was an expert in public finance.

== Early life ==
Charles J. Bullock was born in Boston on May 21, 1869. He graduated from Boston University, and he earned a PhD in economics from the University of Wisconsin in 1895. His thesis supervisor was Richard T. Ely.

== Career ==
Bullock taught economics at Cornell University and Williams College. became an assistant professor of economics at Harvard University in 1903. He became a tenured professor in 1908. He was the author of several books. He also edited The Wealth of Nations by Adam Smith in 1909.

Bullock served as a member of the Colorado House of Representatives from 1913 to 1914.

Bullock was an expert in public finance. He advised the governments of Massachusetts and other states on taxation.

== Death ==
Bullock died on March 17, 1941, in Hingham, Massachusetts.

== Works ==
- Bullock, Charles Jesse (1895). The Finances of the United States from 1775 to 1789: With Especial Reference to the Budget. Madison, Wisconsin: The University.
- Bullock, C. J. (1897). Introduction to the study of Economics. Silver, Burdett and Company.
- Bullock, Charles J. (1900). Essays on the Monetary History of the United States. London: Macmillan.
- Bullock, C. J. (1905). The elements of Economics. Silver, Burdett.
- Bullock, Charles J. (1907). Historical Sketch of the Finances and Financial Policy of Massachusetts from 1780 to 1905. New York: Macmillan. OCLC 2352637.
- Smith, Adam (1909). Bullock, Charles J. (ed.). An Inquiry into the Nature and Causes of the Wealth of Nations. New York: P F Collier & Son.
- Bullock, Charles J. (1920). Selected Readings in Public Finance. New York: Ginn & Company. OCLC 760482073.
