= Frederick Bullock =

Frederick or Fred Bullock may refer to:

- Frederick Bullock (mayor) (1851–1931), Adelaide real-estate agent and mayor
- Frederick Bullock (Royal Navy officer) (1788–1874)
- Frederick Bullock (police officer) (1847–1914)
- Fred Bullock (footballer) (1886–1922), English footballer
- Fred Bullock (golfer) (1918–2006), English golfer
