= Richard Malik =

German footballer

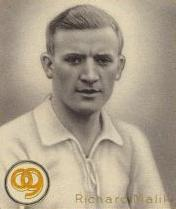
- Malik in 1938

Personal information
- Date of birth: 19 December 1909
- Date of death: 20 January 1945 (aged 35)
- Place of death: Eastern Front
- Position: Forward

Senior career*
Years	Team	Apps	(Gls)
- Beuthener SuSV 09

International career
1932–1933	Germany	2	(1)
- * Club domestic league appearances and goals

Richard Malik (19 December 1909 – 20 January 1945) was a German international footballer.

Drafted into the Wehrmacht he died on the Eastern Front of World War II.

His cousin Leonard Malik was also a footballer representing Poland before World War II.
