= Wilfrid Edward Hiley =

Wilfrid Edward Hiley CBE (1886–1961) was a British botanist, forester, and forest pathologist.

== Education and career ==
In 1908 Hiley graduated with a First in Mathematical Moderations & Botany from the University of Oxford. Beginning in 1908 he worked as a Demonstrator in the Experimental Garden of the Oxford Gardens. He received his M.A. from Queen's College, Oxford and later served on the University of Oxford's Board of the Faculty of Natural Sciences. He began his career as a botanist in the University of Oxford's School of Forestry. In 1919 his first book The Fungal Diseases of the Common Larch was published. Robert Scott Troup with Hiley as assistant gave a course in silviculture with excursions. In 1920 Hiley became a member of the Association of Economic Biologists (renamed in 1934 the Association of Applied Biologists). From 1926 to 1930 he was a lecturer in Forestry Economics at the Imperial Forestry Institute, Oxford (which in 1939 was renamed the Commonwealth Forestry Institute, Oxford). In 1931, after a visit to the United States to advise on the taxation of woodlands, he resigned from the Imperial Forestry Institute and became the manager of the 2000 acres of Dartington Hall woodlands. He retained the post of manager until his death in 1961. In 1947 he became the chair of Dartington Hall Woodlands Limited, upon its inception.

In forestry, the forest rotation, as used in Faustmann's formula, is the planned, approximate felling age of stands or trees. Hiley published a formula useful in estimating the effects of property tax on financial returns from forest rotation.

Hiley was often consulted for advice on forestry management. From 1923 to 1946 he edited the Quarterly Journal of Forestry of the Royal Forestry Society (RFS). He was elected in 1950 the president of the RFS, which awarded him its gold medal in 1961. He was also awarded the gold medal of the Society of Foresters of Great Britain, of which he was a Fellow. In 1956 he was made Commander of the Order of the British Empire (CBE).

== Selected publications ==
=== Articles ===
- Hiley, W. E. (October 1913). "On the value of different degrees of centrifugal force as geotropic stimuli". Annals of Botany (4): 719–758. doi:10.1093/oxfordjournals.aob.a089485.
- Hiley, W. E. (1918). "Suggestion for an honours course". New Phytologist. 17 (5–6): 99–101. doi:10.1111/j.1469-8137.1918.tb07265.x. (letter to the editor)
- Hiley, W. E.; Cunliffe, N. (December 1923). "Further observations on the relation of the height growth of trees to meteorological conditions". Annals of Applied Biology. 10 (3–4): 442–452. doi:10.1111/j.1744-7348.1923.tb05687.x.
- Hiley, W. E. (1927). "A Critical Note on Some Recent Literature on Forest Economics1". Forestry: An International Journal of Forest Research. 1: 97–107. doi:10.1093/oxfordjournals.forestry.a062852.
- Hiley, W. E. (1929). "Cost of Production of Timber in Britain". Forestry: An International Journal of Forest Research. 3: 17–25. doi:10.1093/oxfordjournals.forestry.a063126.
- Hiley, W. E. (1948). "A Basis for Fixing Controlled Prices of Round Coniferous Timber". Forestry: An International Journal of Forest Research. 22: 4–44. doi:10.1093/oxfordjournals.forestry.a062950.
- Hiley, W. E. (1952). "Numerical Thinning: With Special Reference to Japanese Larch". Forestry: An International Journal of Forest Research. 25: 10–18. doi:10.1093/oxfordjournals.forestry.a063036.
- Hiley, W. E. (1956). "The Discussion of Forest Problems". Forestry. 29: 1–3. doi:10.1093/forestry/29.1.1.
- Hiley, W. E. (1959). "Two-Storied High Forest". Forestry. 32 (2): 113–116. doi:10.1093/forestry/32.2.113.

=== Books and monographs ===
- Fungal diseases of the common larch. Oxford: Clarendon Press. 1919. LCCN 20010709; xi+204 pages
- with Norman Cunliffe: Investigation into the relation between height growth of trees and meteorological conditions. Oxford forestry memoirs, no. 1. Oxford: Clarendon Press. 1922. LCCN agr23000362.
- Financial return from the cultivation of Scots and Corsican pines. Oxford forestry memoirs, no. 3. Oxford: Clarendon Press. 1926. LCCN 26023905; 31 pages
- The forest industry of Finland. Oxford forestry memoirs, no. 8. Oxford: Clarendon Press. 1928. LCCN 28022416; 39 pages
- The economics of forestry. Oxford: Clarendon Press. 1930. LCCN agr30000856.
- Hiley, Wilfrid Edward (1931). Improvement of Woodlands. London: Country Life Ltd. ASIN B0014BCEJ4.
- An economic survey of forestry in Kenya and recommendations regarding a forest commission. Nairobi: English Press. 1950. LCCN 83107802.
- Woodland management. 1954. LCCN 54001102.
  - 2nd revised edition. 1967. ASIN B0000CNIG1. LCCN 67098496; edited by C. W. Scott & R. W. V. Palmer
- Economics of plantations (1st ed.). London: Faber & Faber. 1956. ASIN B001884PJK. LCCN 57000662.
- Conifers. London: Faber & Faber. 1959. LCCN 59002475.
- A forest venture. London: Faber & Faber. 1964. ISBN 0571056954. LCCN 67122850. (book completed by Leonard K. Elmhirst)
