= Pietro Tabor =

Italian footballer (born 1919)

Personal information
- Date of birth: 13 March 1919
- Place of birth: Turin, Italy
- Date of death: 29 July 1944 (aged 25)
- Place of death: Genoa, Italy
- Position: Defender

Youth career
- 1937-1938: Juventus

Senior career*
Years	Team	Apps	(Gls)
1938–39	Lucchese	28	(0)
1939–40	Livorno	32	(0)
1940–41	Bari	9	(0)
1941–44	Liguria	59	(5)
- * Club domestic league appearances and goals

Pietro Tabor (13 March 1919 – 29 July 1944) was an Italian football player who played as right-back for various Serie A and Serie B teams.

He was mortally wounded, losing a leg, and subsequently died in July 1944 at the age of 25 by one of the American bombings of Genoa.

== Club career ==
Tabor began his career in the Juventus youth team. His senior career started playing for Lucchese during the 1938–39 Serie A season, which saw his team ending up last and relegated. The next year Tabor played in Serie B with Livorno, then back again to Serie A for the 1940-41 season with Bari.

In 1942 Tabor joined Liguria and played with them for two consecutive Serie A seasons, scoring 5 goals including one during the derby against local rivals Genova 1983 played on February 14, 1943. Serie A was interrupted due to the events of World War II and replaced in the north of the country by the 1944 Campionato Alta Italia, during which Tabor played 15 matches for Liguria.
