= Tom Robson (footballer, born 1907) =

English footballer

Personal information
- Full name: Thomas Robson
- Date of birth: 1907
- Place of birth: Morpeth, England
- Date of death: 10 April 1942 (aged 34)
- Place of death: England
- Height: 5 ft 7 in (1.70 m)
- Position: Wing half

Senior career*
Years	Team	Apps	(Gls)
–1929	Blyth Spartans		
1929–1930	Everton	27	(3)
1930–1931	Sheffield Wednesday	3	(0)
- Yeovil & Petters United
1934–1937	Northampton Town	38	(0)
- Kettering Town
- * Club domestic league appearances and goals

Thomas Robson (1907 – 10 April 1942) was an English professional footballer who played in the Football League for Northampton Town, Everton and Sheffield Wednesday as a wing half. He was described as "a grand type of sportsman and so far as football went, had to depend solely on his skill and ability, for he had neither height nor weight to help him out".

== Personal life ==
As of the outbreak of the Second World War, Robson lived close to Goodison Park with his wife and two children. He served as an ARP warden during the early phase of the war, before enlisting as a leading aircraftman in the Royal Air Force Volunteer Reserve. Robson died of a heart condition on 10 April 1942 and was buried in Kirkdale Cemetery.

== Career statistics ==
Appearances and goals by club, season and competition
Club	Season	League			FA Cup		Total	
Club	Season	Division	Apps	Goals	Apps	Goals	Apps	Goals
Everton	1929–30	First Division	27	0	2	0	29	0
Sheffield Wednesday	1930–31	First Division	1	0	0	0	1	0
Sheffield Wednesday	1931–32	First Division	2	0	0	0	2	0
Sheffield Wednesday	Total		3	0	0	0	3	0
Career total			30	0	2	0	32	0
