= Billy Bryan (footballer) =

English footballer

Personal information
- Date of birth: 6 September 1912
- Place of birth: Bentley, England
- Date of death: 2 August 1944 (aged 31)
- Place of death: Normandy, German-occupied France
- Height: 5 ft 8 3/4 in (1.75 m)
- Position: Goalkeeper

Senior career*
Years	Team	Apps	(Gls)
1932	Owston Park Rangers		
1933–1934	Sunderland	0	(0)
1935–1936	Walsall	9	(0)
1936–1937	Southend United	7	(0)
1937–1939	Swindon Town	29	(0)
1939–1940	Wrexham	3	(0)
Total		48	(0)
- * Club domestic league appearances and goals

William J. Bryan (6 September 1912 – 2 August 1944) was an English professional footballer who played as a goalkeeper in the Football League for Walsall, Southend United, Swindon Town, and Wrexham.

== Personal life ==
Bryan served as a private in the Dorsetshire Regiment during the Second World War and was killed while serving with the 5th Battalion, Dorsetshire Regiment, part of the 43rd (Wessex) Infantry Division, during the Battle of Normandy on 2 August 1944. He is buried at Tilly-sur-Seulles War Cemetery.

== Career statistics ==
Appearances and goals by club, season and competition
Club	Season	League			FA Cup		Total	
Club	Season	Division	Apps	Goals	Apps	Goals	Apps	Goals
Walsall	1935–36	Third Division North	9	0	0	0	9	0
Southend United	1936–37	Third Division South	7	0	0	0	7	0
Swindon Town	1937–38	Third Division South	12	0	5	0	17	0
Swindon Town	1938–39	Third Division South	12	0	0	0	12	0
Swindon Town	Total		24	0	5	0	29	0
Wrexham	1939–40	Third Division North	3	0	0	0	3	0
Career total			43	0	5	0	48	0
