= Emily Valentine Bullock =

New Zealand artist and sculptor

Emily Valentine Bullock is a New Zealand artist based in Sydney, Australia. Her work is in the permanent collection of Sarjeant Gallery in Whanganui, New Zealand.

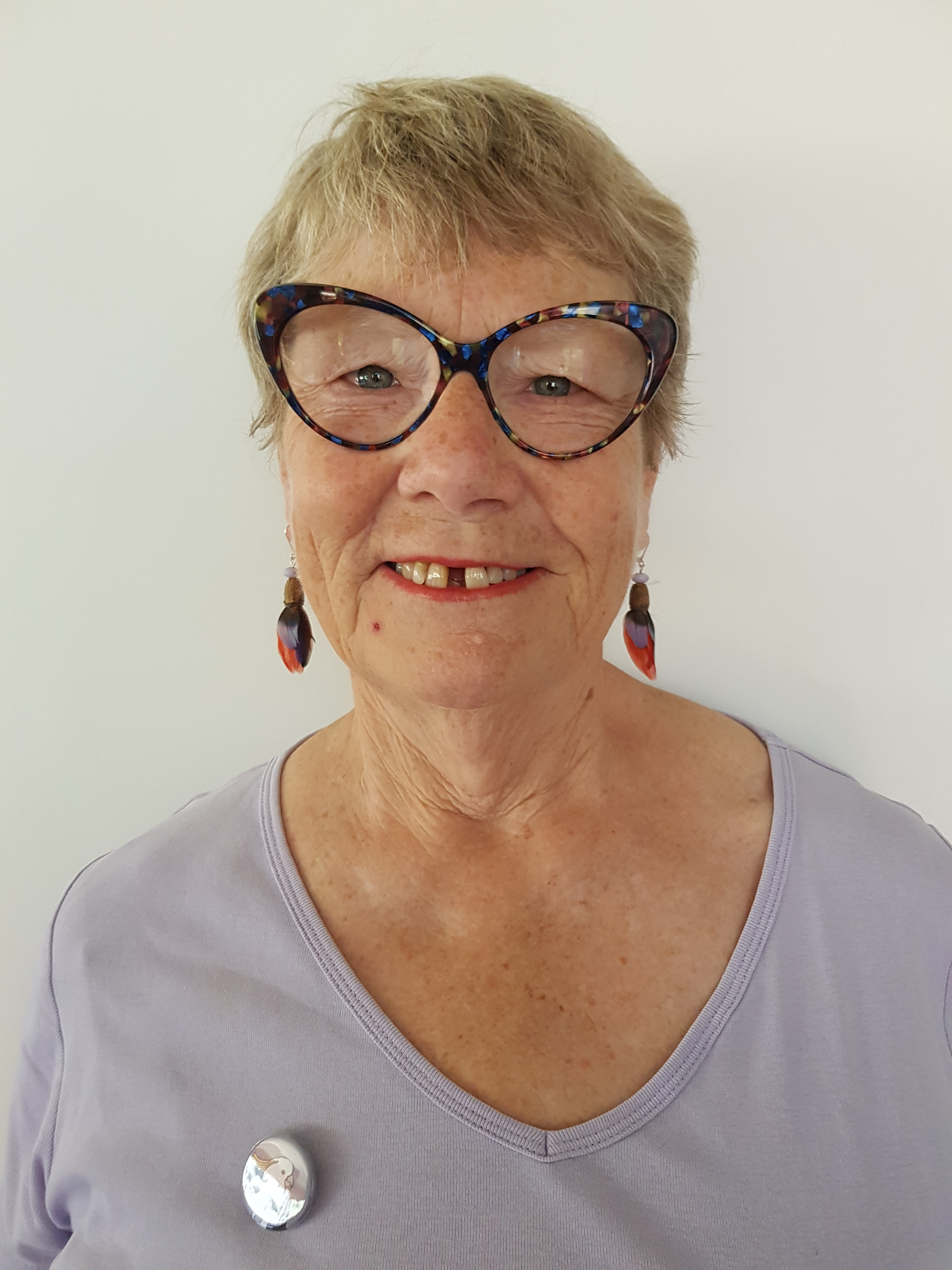
Emily Valentine Bullock

== Biography ==
Bullock graduated from Sydney College of the Arts in 1987 with a bachelor of visual arts, majoring in jewellery. She specialises in creating objects using, or decorated with, bird feathers. She also uses taxidermy to make pieces of wearable art, such as a bra made from her deceased pet budgerigars, which won the 2002 Bizarre Bra section in the World of Wearable Art Awards. In 2015, her entry 'Sulphur Crested Frockatoo' was awarded the WOW Factor Award at the same event, judged by Dame Suzie Moncrieff.

== Prizes, Residencies, & Awards ==
In 1998, Bullock received the NAVA grant for printing of invitations and marketing for her solo show, Beaded Booty, at the Shopfront Gallery in North Sydney.

From 2004 to 2005, Emily co-curated Meldings, an exhibition of contemporary jewellers from New South Wales

In 2010, Bullock was in residence at Tylee Cottage in Whanganui for her work on feathered vehicles and dogs.

She also received the Peoples Choice Award for her work, "Lorwhawha", in the Sculpture Bermagui exhibition in 2022 in Bermagui, NSW
