= Walter Sidebottom =

English footballer

Personal information
- Date of birth: 2 February 1921
- Place of birth: Hunslet, England
- Date of death: 23 October 1943 (aged 22)
- Place of death: HMS Charybdis, English Channel
- Position(s): Winger

Senior career*
Years	Team	Apps	(Gls)
1938–1941	Bolton Wanderers	1	(0)
- *Club domestic league appearances and goals

Walter Sidebottom (1 February 1921 – 23 October 1943) was an English professional footballer who played as a winger in the Football League for Bolton Wanderers.

== Personal life ==
Sidebottom served as an able seaman in the Royal Navy during the Second World War. Posted aboard HMS Charybdis, he was killed in action when the ship was sunk by German torpedo-boat destroyers at the Battle of Sept-Îles on 23 October 1943. Sidebottom is commemorated on the Plymouth Naval Memorial.

== Career statistics ==
Appearances and goals by club, season and competition
Club	Season	Division	League		FA Cup		Total	
Club	Season	Division	Apps	Goals	Apps	Goals	Apps	Goals
Bolton Wanderers	1938–39	First Division	1	0	0	0	1	0
Career total			1	0	0	0	1	0
