= William Parr (footballer) =

English footballer

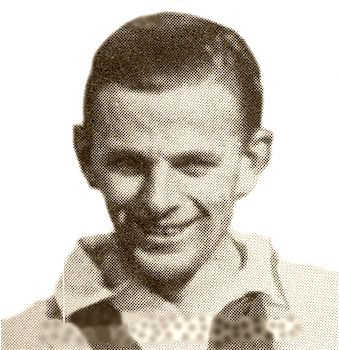

Personal information
- Full name: William Wilfred Parr
- Date of birth: 23 April 1915
- Place of birth: Blackpool, England
- Date of death: 8 March 1942 (aged 26)
- Place of death: St Ervan, England
- Position: Outside right

Senior career*
Years	Team	Apps	(Gls)
1935–1938	Blackpool	18	
1939–1940	Dulwich Hamlet		
1939–1940	Arsenal		
1939–1940	Wealdstone (guest)	23	(15)

International career
1936–1939	England Amateur	12	(9)
- * Club domestic league appearances and goals

William Wilfred Parr (23 April 1915 – 8 March 1942) was an England amateur International footballer and an English professional footballer who played as an outside right for Blackpool, Dulwich Hamlet and Arsenal. He joined Arsenal in May 1939 but his first game with the team was not until almost a year later during World War II, in April 1940 at Southend. He then joined the Royal Air Force Volunteer Reserve.

== England amateur football career ==
Parr took part in the 1937 Tour of New Zealand, Australia and Ceylon by the England Amateur National Team.

== Death ==
A Sergeant in the Royal Air Force Volunteer Reserve, Parr was one of three crewmen on board the Lockheed Hudson V serial number AM535 of No. 233 Squadron RAF based at RAF St Eval, who were killed when it crashed in a field at Lower Treburrick Farm, St Ervan, four miles north east of RAF St Mawgan in Cornwall, on the night of 8 March 1942. The three airmen were conducting a training exercise, but overshot the airfield and crashed, killing pilot Parr and the other two on board.
