= George Bullock (sculptor) =

English sculptor (c.1777–1818)

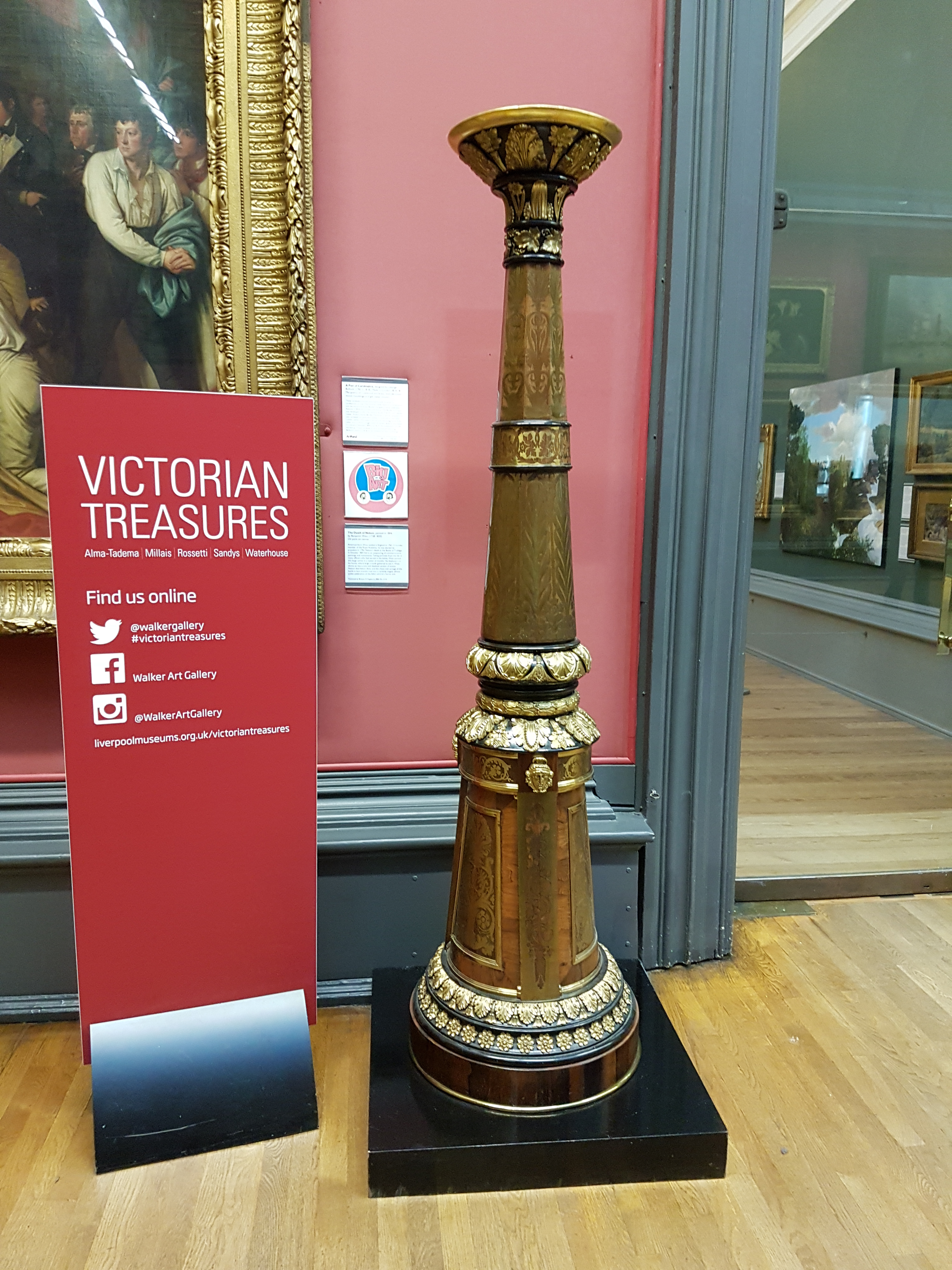
A large candle stand by George Bullock, (which is on display at the Walker Art Gallery, Liverpool).

George Bullock (c.1777–1818) was a sculptor and furniture-maker working in Liverpool and London.

== Life ==
George Bullock was born in Birmingham, where his mother ran an exhibition of wax models in the late 1790s. His brother, William Bullock, opened a museum of curiosities in the city in 1800. He moved it to Liverpool the next year, and George went with him.

By 1804, George Bullock had left his brother's museum, and gone into business with a looking-glass maker called William Stoakes. They advertised themselves as "Cabinet Makers, General Furnishers and Marble Workers", trading from a showroom called the "Grecian Rooms" in Bold Street, Liverpool. Around 1806, Bullock dissolved his partnership with Stoakes and took over the Mona marble quarries at Llanvechell on the island of Anglesey for a lease of £1000. The marble was shipped to Liverpool, where it was used for chimneypieces and other decorations. He used it widely in his furnishing schemes, such as the refurbishment of Thomas Johnes’ house at Hafod. He also supplied marble to other sculptors.

At about this time, a guide to Liverpool described his Grecian Rooms as offering "an extensive assortment of elegant and fashionable furniture; as also, statues, figures, tripods, candelabra, antique lamps, sphinxes, griffins, &c., in marble, bronze, and artificial stone." Bullock also stocked "a good collection of ancient and modern busts; among the latter, those of many of the most distinguished characters in Liverpool and its neighbourhood, modelled by himself."

Following the success of his company he moved to London in 1813, becoming director of the Mona Marble Works. These marbles were used in the monuments to the Rev Glover Moore in St Cuthbert's in Halsall, Lancashire, and to Anna Maria Bold in St Luke's in Farnworth, Lancashire. He exhibited at the Royal Academy in London and the Liverpool Academy between 1804 and 1816. He was the President of the Liverpool Academy in 1810 and 1811. He also undertook commissions for his furniture designs, notably for Sir Walter Scott and for the government, to provide furnishings for Napoleon's exile on St. Helena.

He died at home 4 Tenterden Street near Cavendish Square in London.

== Known works ==
- Bust of William Roscoe (1804)
- Bust of the Duke of Gloucester (1806)
- Statue of Horatio Nelson (1807) in Liverpool (from Coade stone)
- Bust of Sir William Elford (1807)
- Bust of Sarah Siddons (1808)
- Bust of Sir James Smith (1810)
- Bust of Dr Wilkinson (1810)
- Bust of Lord Tamworth (1811)
- Bust of Charles Kemble (1812)
