= Joe Rooney (footballer) =

English footballer

Personal information
- Full name: Joseph Rooney
- Date of birth: 2 February 1917
- Place of birth: Walker, England
- Date of death: 5 May 1941 (aged 24)
- Place of death: Belfast, Northern Ireland
- Position: Central defender

Senior career*
Years	Team	Apps	(Gls)
1936	Walker Celtic		
1938–1939	Wolverhampton Wanderers	2	(0)
1940–1941	Portadown	0	(0)
- * Club domestic league appearances and goals

Joseph Rooney (2 February 1917 – 5 May 1941) was an English professional footballer who played as a central defender in the Football League for Wolverhampton Wanderers.

== Personal life ==
Rooney served as a private in the Gloucestershire Regiment during the Second World War. Deployed to Northern Ireland in late 1940, Rooney signed for Portadown in December 1940, but is not known to have appeared for the team. He was killed on 5 May 1941 during the Belfast Blitz and was buried at Walker (Christ Church) Churchyard.

== Career statistics ==
Appearances and goals by club, season and competition
Club	Season	League			FA Cup		Total	
Club	Season	Division	Apps	Goals	Apps	Goals	Apps	Goals
Wolverhampton Wanderers	1937–38	First Division	2	0	0	0	2	0
Career total			2	0	0	0	2	0
