= George Bullock (footballer) =

English footballer (1916–1943)

Personal information
- Full name: George Frederick Bullock
- Date of birth: 22 January 1916
- Place of birth: Wolverhampton, England
- Date of death: 31 May 1943 (aged 27)
- Place of death: Appleton, England
- Height: 5 ft 5 in (1.65 m)
- Position: Winger

Senior career*
Years	Team	Apps	(Gls)
1935	Oakengates Town		
1936–1937	Birmingham	0	(0)
1936	Stafford Rangers		
1936–1940	Barnsley	72	(12)
- * Club domestic league appearances and goals

George Frederick Bullock (22 January 1916 – 31 May 1943) was an English professional footballer who played as a winger in the Football League for Barnsley.

== Personal life ==
Bullock was married and served as a naval airman 1st class in the Fleet Air Arm during the Second World War. Stationed at RNAS Stretton, he was killed in a road accident near Appleton on 31 May 1943 while returning to base following a dance. The vehicle crashed through a hedge and overturned, killing all six inside, including Bullock. He was buried at Heath Town (Holy Trinity) Churchyard, Wolverhampton.

== Career statistics ==
Appearances and goals by club, season and competition
Club	Season	Division	League		FA Cup		Total	
Club	Season	Division	Apps	Goals	Apps	Goals	Apps	Goals
Barnsley	1936–37	Second Division	1	0	0	0	1	0
Barnsley	1937–38	Second Division	28	2	0	0	28	2
Barnsley	1938–39	Third Division North	39	10	1	0	40	12
Barnsley	1939–40	Second Division	3	0	0	0	3	0
Career total			71	12	1	0	72	12
