= Hiley Bamsey =

English footballer

Personal information
- Full name: Hiley Royal Bamsey
- Date of birth: 8 October 1916
- Place of birth: Woodbury, England
- Date of death: 31 December 1943 (aged 27)
- Place of death: Kingdom of Iraq
- Position: Centre half

Senior career*
Years	Team	Apps	(Gls)
–1935	Woodbury		
1935–1938	Exeter City	42	(0)
	Barrow	0	(0)
- * Club domestic league appearances and goals

Hiley Royal Bamsey (8 October 1916 – 31 December 1943) was an English amateur footballer who played in the Football League for Exeter City as a centre half.

== Personal life ==
Bamsey served as a sergeant in the Royal Electrical and Mechanical Engineers during the Second World War and was killed in Iraq on 31 December 1943. He was buried in Khayat Beach War Cemetery, near Haifa.
