= 1968–69 Inter-Cities Fairs Cup =

Final positions
- Champions: (England) Newcastle United (1st title)
- Runners-up: (Hungary) Újpest

Tournament statistics
- Matches played: 120

The eleventh Inter-Cities Fairs Cup was played over the 1968–1969 season. The competition was won by Newcastle United over two legs in the final against Újpest. It was the second consecutive time that a Hungarian side finished runners-up in the competition, and the first time Newcastle United had competed in a European competition. Newcastle did not win a major trophy again until the 2024–25 EFL Cup.

== First round ==
KB and Union Luxembourg withdrew when drawn to play in Warsaw Pact countries.

Team 1	Agg.	Team 2	1st leg	2nd leg
Chelsea (England)	9–3	(Scotland) Morton	5–0	4–3
K. Beerschot V.A.C. (Belgium)	2–3	(Netherlands) DWS	1–1	1–2
Rangers (Scotland)	2–1	(Socialist Federal Republic of Yugoslavia) FK Vojvodina	2–0	0–1
DOS Utrecht (Netherlands)	2–3	(Republic of Ireland) Dundalk	1–1	1 – 2(aet)
R. Daring Club Molenbeek (Belgium)	2–3	(Greece) Panathinaikos	2–1	0–2
Athletic Bilbao (Spain)	3–3 (c)	(England) Liverpool	2–1	1 – 2(aet)
Lausanne-Sport (Switzerland)	0–4	(Italy) Juventus	0–2	0–2
Wacker Innsbruck (Austria)	2–5	(West Germany) Eintracht Frankfurt	2–2	0–3
Slavia Sofia (Bulgaria)	0–2	(Scotland) Aberdeen	0–0	0–2
Botev Plovdiv (Bulgaria)	3–3 (a)	(Spain) Zaragoza	3–1	0–2
Sporting Clube de Portugal	5–4	(Spain) Valencia CF	4–0	1–4
Newcastle United (England)	4–2	(Netherlands) Feyenoord Rotterdam	4–0	0–2
Vitória de Setúbal (Portugal)	6–1	(Northern Ireland) Linfield	3–0	3–1
Olympique Lyonnais (France)	1–1 (c)	(Portugal) Académica	1–0	0 – 1(aet)
Hansa Rostock (East Germany)	4–2	(France) OGC Nice	3–0	1–2
Dinamo Zagreb (Socialist Federal Republic of Yugoslavia)	2–3	(Italy) Fiorentina	1–1	1–2
Rapid București (Romania)	4–7	(Socialist Federal Republic of Yugoslavia) OFK Beograd	3–1	1 – 6(aet)
Bologna (Italy)	6–2	(Switzerland) Basel	4–1	2–1
Göztepe (Turkey)	2–2 (c)	(France) Olympique de Marseille	2–0	0 – 2(aet)
Leixões SC (Portugal)	1–1 (a)	(Romania) Argeş Piteşti	1–1	0–0
Metz (France)	3–7	(West Germany) Hamburger SV	1–4	2–3
Wiener Sportclub (Austria)	1–5	(Czechoslovakia) Slavia Prague	1–0	0–5
Olimpija Ljubljana (Socialist Federal Republic of Yugoslavia)	1–5	(Scotland) Hibernian	0–3	1–2
1. FC Lokomotive Leipzig (East Germany)	w/o	(Denmark) KB	–	–
Standard Liège (Belgium)	2–3	(England) Leeds United	0–0	2–3
Napoli (Italy)	3–2	(Switzerland) Grasshopper	3–1	0–1
FK Skeid (Norway)	2–3	(Sweden) AIK	1–1	1–2
Hannover 96 (West Germany)	4–2	(Denmark) B1909	3–2	1–0
Atlético Madrid (Spain)	2–2 (a)	(Belgium) K.S.V. Waregem	2–1	0–1
Legia Warszawa (Poland)	9–2	(West Germany) TSV 1860 München	6–0	3–2
Aris Thessaloniki (Greece)	7–0	(Malta) Hibernians	1–0	6–0
Újpest (Hungary)	w/o	US Luxembourg	–	–

=== First leg ===
18 September 1968

Chelsea (England)	5-0	(Scotland) Greenock Morton
Osgood 44'; Birchenall 45'; Cooke 50'; Boyle 67'; Hollins 84'

11 September 1968

Beerschot (Belgium)	1-1	(Netherlands) DWS Amsterdam
Houben 34'		Van der Vall 56' (pen.)

18 September 1968

Rangers (Scotland)	2-0	(Socialist Federal Republic of Yugoslavia) Vojvodina Novi Sad
Greig 28' (pen.); Jardine 84'

11 September 1968

DOS Utrecht (Netherlands)	1–1	(Republic of Ireland) Dundalk
Van Veen 27'	Report	Stokes 74'

Stadion Galgenwaard, Utrecht
Attendance: 4,000
Referee: Joseph Minnoy, Belgium

25 September 1968

Daring Club Bruxelles (Belgium)	2–1	(Greece) Panathanaikos
Randoux 6'; Coppens 67'		Gonios 64'

18 September 1968

Lausanne-Sport (Switzerland)	0–2	(Italy) Juventus
		Zigoni 17'; Leoncini 63'

Lausanne

18 September 1968

Athletic Bilbao (Spain)	2-1	(England) Liverpool
Estefano 15'; Ormaza 36'		Hunt 67'

10 September 1968

Wacker Innsbruck (Austria)	2-2	(West Germany) Eintracht Frankfurt
Aust 20'; Lotz 81' (o.g.)		Abbé 26'; Grabowski 65' (pen.)

17 September 1968

Slavia Sofia (Bulgaria)	0-0	(Scotland) Aberdeen

18 September 1968

Sporting CP (Portugal)	4-0	(Spain) Valencia
Lourenço 26', 73'; Gonçalves 56' de Sousa 81'

18 September 1968

Hansa Rostock (East Germany)	3-0	(France) OGC Nice
Drews 23'; Decker 51', 89'

18 September 1968

Dinamo Zagreb (Socialist Federal Republic of Yugoslavia)	1–1	(Italy) Fiorentina
Zambata 18'		Pirovano 83'

Zagreb

11 September 1968

Rapid București (Romania)	3–1	(Socialist Federal Republic of Yugoslavia) OFK Beograd
Neagu 28', 90'; Năsturescu 85'	Report	Stepanović 13'

Stadionul Republicii, Bucharest
Attendance: 15,000
Referee: Nejat Şener (Turkey)

11 September 1968

Newcastle United (England)	4-0	(Netherlands) Feyenoord
Scott 6'; Robson 26'; Gibb 42'; Davies 72'

18 September 1968

Bologna (Italy)	4–1	(Switzerland) Basel
Turra 12'; Cresci 50'; Pace 53'; Savoldi 83'		Konrad 48'

Bologna

11 September 1968

Göztepe (Turkey)	2–0	(France) Olympique Marseille
Halil 21', 46'

19 September 1968

Leixões (Portugal)	1–1	(Romania) Argeș Pitești
Gonçalves 18'	Report	Nuțu 73'

Estádio das Antas, Porto
Attendance: 5,000
Referee: Mariano Medina Iglesias (Spain)

18 September 1968

Metz (France)	1–4	(West Germany) Hamburger SV
Hausser 21'	Report	Dörfel 22'; Zvunka 57' (o.g.); Krämer 63'; Hönig 82'

18 September 1968

Wiener Sportklub (Austria)	1-0	(Czechoslovakia) Slavia Praha
Buzek 44'

18 September 1968

Standard Liege (Belgium)	0-0	(England) Leeds United

11 September 1968

Napoli (Italy)	3–1	(Switzerland) Grasshopper
Altafini 6'; Salvi 12' 33'		Rüegg 78'

Naples

18 September 1968

Botev Plovdiv (Bulgaria)	3–1	(Spain) Zaragoza
Nenov 32'; Dermendzhiev 65'; Popov 78'		Tejedor 88'

Plovdiv

19 September 1968

Vitória Setúbal (Portugal)	3–0	(Northern Ireland) Linfield
Tomé 18'; Figueiredo 63'; Carriço 81'

Estádio do Bonfim, Setúbal
Attendance: 8,000
Referee: Manuel Gómez Arribas (Spain)

2 October 1968

Lyon (France)	1–0	(Portugal) Académica
Guy 85'

Stade de Gerland, Lyon
Attendance: 10,000
Referee: Joseph Moscato (Luxembourg)

18 September 1968

Olimpija (Socialist Federal Republic of Yugoslavia)	0-3	(Scotland) Hibernian
		Stevenson 32'; Stein 34'; Šoškić 71' (o.g.)

18 September 1968

FK Skeid (Norway)	1-1	(Sweden) AIK Stockholm
Mathisen 36'		Andersson 22'

1 October 1968

Hannover 96 (West Germany)	3-2	(Denmark) B1909
Siemensmeyer 15'; Heynckes 23'; Skoblar 30'		Richter 48'; Hansen 52'

25 September 1968

Atlético Madrid (Spain)	2–1	(Belgium) Waregem
Aragones 20' (pen.); Barriocanal 50'		Bettens 42'

2 October 1968

Legia Warsaw (Poland)	6-0	(West Germany) TSV 1860 München
Pieszko 1', 41'; Blaut 22'; Deyna 46'; Zmijewski 52'; Gadocha 57'

11 September 1968

Aris Thessaloniki (Greece)	1-0	(Malta) Hibernians F.C.
Alexiadis 22'

=== Second leg ===
30 September 1968

(Scotland) Greenock Morton	3-4	(England) Chelsea
Thorup 7'; Mason 10'; Taylor 26'		Baldwin 3'; Birchenall 34'; Houseman 42'; Tambling 84'

Chelsea won 9–3 on aggregate.

25 September 1968

DWS Amsterdam (Belgium)	2-1	(Belgium) Beerschot
Pijlman 34'; Rensenbrink 80'		Houben 27'

DWS Amsterdam won 3–2 on aggregate

2 October 1968

Vojvodina Novi Sad (Socialist Federal Republic of Yugoslavia)	1-0	(Scotland) Rangers
Nikezić 66'

Rangers won 2–1 on aggregate.

1 October 1968

(Republic of Ireland) Dundalk	2–1 (a.e.t.)	DOS Utrecht (Netherlands)
Stokes 8'; Morrissey 109'	Report	Nieuwenhuys 20'

Oriel Park, Dundalk
Attendance: 12,000
Referee: Tom Wharton, Scotland

Dundalk won 3–2 on aggregate.

9 October 1968

Panathinaikos (Greece)	2–0	(Belgium) Daring Club Bruxelles
Rokidis 83'; Frantzis 87'

Panathinaikos won 3–2 on aggregate.

9 October 1968

Juventus (Italy)	2–0	(Switzerland) Lausanne-Sport
Benetti 43' del Sol 74'

Turin

Juventus won 4–0 on aggregate.

2 October 1968

Liverpool (England)	2-1 [aet]	(Spain) Athletic Bilbao
Lawler 78'; Hughes 87'		Argoitia 32'

Aggregate score 3-3, Liverpool won on coin toss

1 October 1968

Eintracht Frankfurt (West Germany)	3-0	(Austria) Wacker Innsbruck
Kalb 7'; Nickel 47', 87'

Frankfurt won 5–2 on aggregate

2 October 1968

Aberdeen (Scotland)	2-0	(Bulgaria) Slavia Sofia
Robb 7'; Taylor 40'

Aberdeen won 2–0 on aggregate.

2 October 1968

Valencia (Spain)	4-1 [aet]	(Portugal) Sporting CP
Claremunt 19'; Blayet 31', 73'; Sol 87'		Faria 112'

Sporting won 5–4 on aggregate.

2 October 1968

OGC Nice (France)	2–1	(East Germany) Hansa Rostock
Goeyvaerts 48' (pen.); Robin 65'		Drews 71'

Hansa Rostock won 4–2 on aggregate.

2 October 1968

Fiorentina (Italy)	2–1	(Socialist Federal Republic of Yugoslavia) Dinamo Zagreb
Amarildo 1'; Maraschi 37'		Novak 64'

Florence

Fiorentina won 3–2 on aggregate.

18 September 1968

OFK Beograd (Socialist Federal Republic of Yugoslavia)	6–1 (a.e.t.)	(Romania) Rapid București
Santrač 4', 13', 104', 107'; Turudija 11', 100'	Report	Codreanu 29'

Omladinski Stadium, Belgrade
Attendance: 12,000
Referee: Konstantin Zečević (Yugoslavia)

OFK Beograd won 7–4 on aggregate.

17 September 1968

Feyenoord (Netherlands)	2-0	(England) Newcastle United
Kindvall 28'; Van der Heide 54'

Newcastle won 4–2 on aggregate.

2 October 1968

Basel (Switzerland)	1–2	(Italy) Bologna
Hauser 42'		Pace 46'; Savoldi 63'

Basel

Bologna won 6–2 on aggregate.

2 October 1968

Olympique Marseille (France)	2–0 (a.e.t.)	(Turkey) Göztepe
Joseph 75'; Gueniche 83'

Göztepe 1-1 Marseille on aggregate. Göztepe won on a coin toss.

2 October 1968

Argeș Pitești (Romania)	0–0	(Portugal) Leixões
	Report

Stadionul 1 Mai, Pitești
Attendance: 15,000
Referee: Paul Schiller (Austria)

Argeș Pitești 1–1 Leixões on aggregate. Argeș Pitești won on away goals rule.

1 October 1968

Hamburger SV (West Germany)	3–2	(France) Metz
Hönig 7'; Krämer 18'; Seeler 88'	Report	Hitz 40'; Niesser 85'

Hamburger SV won 7–3 on aggregate.

2 October 1968

Slavia Praha (Czechoslovakia)	5-0	(Austria) Wiener Sportklub
Nepomucky 29', 75'; Tesar 42'; Ziegler 65'; Kopecky 87'

Slavia Praha won 5–1 on aggregate

23 October 1968

Leeds United (England)	3-2	(Belgium) Standard Liege
Charlton 52'; Lorimer 75'; Bremner 88'		Kostedde 44'; Galić 50'

Leeds United won 3–2 on aggregate

23 October 1968

Grasshopper (Switzerland)	1–0	(Italy) Napoli
Grahn 58'

Zürich

Napoli won 3–2 on aggregate.

2 October 1968

Zaragoza (Spain)	2–0	(Bulgaria) Botev Plovdiv
Bustillo 24', 76'

Zaragoza

Zaragoza 3–3 Botev Plovdiv on aggregate. Zaragoza won on away goals rule.

9 October 1968

Linfield (Northern Ireland)	1–3	(Portugal) Vitória Setúbal
Scott 26'		Figueiredo 2'; Baptista 24'; Arcanjo 29'

Windsor Park, Belfast
Attendance: 20,000
Referee: Norman Burtenshaw (England)

Vitória Setúbal won 6–1 on aggregate.

9 October 1968

Académica (Portugal)	1–0 (a.e.t.)	(France) Lyon
Manuel António 76'

Estádio Municipal de Coimbra, Coimbra
Attendance: 6,500
Referee: Adolfo Bueno Perales (Spain)

1–1 on aggregate. Lyon won on toss of coin.

2 October 1968

Hibernian (Scotland)	2–1	(Socialist Federal Republic of Yugoslavia) Olimpija
Davis 61' (pen.) 68' (pen.)		Frančeškin 4'

Hibernian won 5–1 on aggregate.

26 September 1968

AIK Stockholm (Sweden)	2-1	(Norway) FK Skeid
Lundblad 5'; Ohlsson 70'		Sjrberg 31'

AIK Stockholm won 3–2 on aggregate

9 October 1968

B1909 (Denmark)	0-1	(West Germany) Hannover 96
		Siemensmeyer 80'

Hannover won 4–2 on aggregate.

2 October 1968

Waregem (Belgium)	1-0	(Spain) Atlético Madrid
Bettens 53'

Aggregate score 2-2. Waregem progressed on away goals.

9 October 1968

TSV 1860 München (West Germany)	2-3	(Poland) Legia Warsaw
Patzke 30' (pen.); Schutz 40'		Blaut 8'; Pieszko 57'; Brychczy 89'

Legia Warsaw won 9–2 on aggregate.

22 September 1968

Hibernians F.C. (Malta)	0-6	(Greece) Aris Thessaloniki
		Grimbelakos 4'; Papaioannou 30', 80', 89'; Siropoulos 51'; Alexiadis 84'

Aris Thessaloniki won 7–0 on aggregate

== Second round ==
Team 1	Agg.	Team 2	1st leg	2nd leg
Chelsea (England)	0–0 (c)	(Netherlands) DWS	0–0	0 – 0(aet)
Rangers (Scotland)	9–1	(Republic of Ireland) Dundalk FC	6–1	3–0
Panathinaikos (Greece)	0–1	(Spain) Athletic Bilbao	0–0	0–1
Juventus (Italy)	0–1	(West Germany) Eintracht Frankfurt	0–0	0 – 1(aet)
Aberdeen (Scotland)	2–4	(Spain) Zaragoza	2–1	0–3
Sporting Clube de Portugal	1–2	(England) Newcastle United	1–1	0–1
Vitória de Setúbal (Portugal)	7–1	(France) Olympique Lyonnais	5–0	2–1
Hansa Rostock (East Germany)	4–4 (a)	(Italy) Fiorentina	3–2	1–2
OFK Beograd (Socialist Federal Republic of Yugoslavia)	2–1	(Italy) Bologna	1–0	1–1
Göztepe (Turkey)	5–3	(Romania) Argeş Piteşti	3–0	2–3
Hamburger SV (West Germany)	5–4	(Czechoslovakia) SK Slavia Prague	4–1	1–3
Hibernian (Scotland)	4–1	(East Germany) 1. FC Lokomotive Leipzig	3–1	1–0
Leeds United (England)	2–2 (c)	(Italy) Napoli	2–0	0 – 2(aet)
AIK (Sweden)	6–7	(West Germany) Hannover 96	4–2	2–5
K.S.V. Waregem (Belgium)	1–2	(Poland) Legia Warsaw	1–0	0–2
Aris Thessaloniki (Greece)	2–11	(Hungary) Újpest	1–2	1–9

=== First leg ===
23 October 1968

Chelsea (England)	0-0	(Netherlands) DWS Amsterdam

30 October 1968

Rangers (Scotland)	6–1	(Republic of Ireland) Dundalk
Henderson 13' 26'; Greig 50'; Ferguson 55' 90'; Brennan 88' og	Report	Murray 43'

Ibrox Park, Glasgow
Attendance: 30,000
Referee: Curt Nystrand, Sweden

20 November 1968

Panathinaikos (Greece)	0–0	(Spain) Athletic Bilbao

6 November 1968

Juventus (Italy)	0–0	(West Germany) Eintracht Frankfurt

Turin

23 October 1968

Aberdeen (Scotland)	2–1	(Spain) Real Zaragoza
Forrest 32'; Smith 64'		Tejedor 72'

30 October 1968

Sporting CP (Portugal)	1–1	(England) Newcastle United
Morais 89'		Scott 31'

13 November 1968

Hansa Rostock (East Germany)	3–2	(Italy) Fiorentina
Kostmann 69'; Barthels 80'; Hergesell 90'		Maraschi 70'; Rizzo 84'

Rostock

6 November 1968

OFK Beograd (Socialist Federal Republic of Yugoslavia)	1–0	(Italy) Bologna
Santrač 32'

Belgrade

31 October 1968

Vitória Setúbal (Portugal)	5–0	(France) Olympique Lyonnais
Carriço 30'; Tomé 32', 70'; Figueiredo 57'; Petita 81'

Estádio do Bonfim, Setúbal
Attendance: 10,000
Referee: Alfred Delcourt (Belgium)

30 October 1968

Göztepe (Turkey)	3–0	(Romania) Argeș Pitești
Öznur 3'; Aksel 10', 35'	Report

İzmir Alsancak, İzmir
Attendance: 13,000
Referee: Bohumil Smejkal (Czechoslovakia)

20 November 1968

Hamburger SV (West Germany)	4-1	(Czechoslovakia) Slavia Praha
Schulz 17'; Fock 29'; Krämer 34' 80' (pen.)		Tesar 40'

13 November 1968

Hibernian (Scotland)	3-1	(East Germany) Lokomotiv Leipzig
McBride 3', 14', 44'		Fritsch 65'

13 November 1968

Leeds United (England)	2–0	(Italy) Napoli
Charlton 23' 25'

Elland Road, Leeds

6 November 1968

Waregem (Belgium)	1–0	(Poland) Legia Warszawa
Lambert 37' (pen.)

=== Second leg ===
30 October 1968

DWS Amsterdam (Netherlands)	0–0	(England) Chelsea

DWS 0-0 Chelsea on aggregate. DWS progressed on a coin toss.

13 November 1968

Dundalk (Republic of Ireland)	0–3	Rangers (Scotland)
	Report	Mathieson 45'; Stein 64' 81'

Oriel Park, Dundalk
Attendance: 8,000
Referee: Kåre Sirevaag, Norway

Rangers won 9–1 on aggregate.

27 November 1968

Athletic Bilbao (Spain)	1–0	(Greece) Panathinaikos
Rojo 43'

Bilbao won 1–0 on aggregate

13 November 1968

Olympique Lyonnais (France)	1–2	(Portugal) Vitória Setúbal
Félix 29'		Figueiredo 11'; Arcanjo 59' (pen.)

Stade de Gerland, Lyon
Attendance: 5,000
Referee: Daniel Zariquiegi Izco (Spain)

Vitória Setúbal won 7–1 on aggregate.

21 November 1968

Eintracht Frankfurt (West Germany)	1–0 (a.e.t.)	(Italy) Juventus
Bechtold 120'

Frankfurt am Main

Eintracht Frankfurt won 1–0 on aggregate.

30 October 1968

Real Zaragoza (Spain)	3-0	(Scotland) Aberdeen
Martinez 35'; Tejedor 43'; Villa 79'

Zaragoza won 4–2 on aggregate.

20 November 1968

Newcastle United (England)	1-0	(Portugal) Sporting CP
Robson 10'

Newcastle won 2–1 on aggregate.

27 November 1968

Fiorentina (Italy)	2–1	(East Germany) Hansa Rostock
Rizzo 36'; Merlo 68'		Kostmann 26'

Florence

Fiorentina 4–4 Hansa Rostock on aggregate. Fiorentina won on away goals rule.

20 November 1968

Bologna (Italy)	1–1	(Socialist Federal Republic of Yugoslavia) OFK Beograd
Mujesan 40'		Santrač 80'

Bologna

OFK Beograd won 2–1 on aggregate.

13 November 1968

Argeș Pitești (Romania)	3–2	(Turkey) Göztepe
Prepurgel 56' (pen.); Derebaşı 58' (o.g.); Jercan 65'	Report	Öznur 9'; Zemzem 77'

Stadionul 1 Mai, Pitești
Attendance: 8,000
Referee: Leonidas Vamvakopoulos (Greece)

Göztepe won 5–3 on aggregate.

27 November 1968

Slavia Praha (Czechoslovakia)	3-1	(West Germany) Hamburger SV
Kopecky 40'; Vesely 20'; Lukác 77'		Hönig 68'

Hamburg won 5–4 on aggregate.

20 November 1968

Lokomotiv Leipzig (East Germany)	0-1	(Scotland) Hibernian
		Grant 3'

Hibernian won 4–1 on aggregate.

27 November 1968

Napoli (Italy)	2–0	(England) Leeds United
Sala 14'; Juliano 84' (pen.)

Naples

Napoli 2–2 Leeds United on aggregate. Leeds United won on a coin toss.

12 November 1968

Legia Warszawa (Poland)	2–0	(Belgium) Waregem
Deyna 38'; Gadocha 89'

Legia won 2–1 on aggregate.

== Third round ==
Team 1	Agg.	Team 2	1st leg	2nd leg
DWS (Netherlands)	1–4	(Scotland) Rangers	0–2	1–2
Athletic Bilbao (Spain)	2–1	(West Germany) Eintracht Frankfurt	1–0	1–1
Zaragoza (Spain)	4 – 4(a)	(England) Newcastle United	3–2	1–2
Vitória de Setúbal (Portugal)	4–2	(Italy) Fiorentina	3–0	1–2
OFK Beograd (Socialist Federal Republic of Yugoslavia)	3 – 3(a)	(Turkey) Göztepe	3–1	0–2
Hamburger SV (West Germany)	2(a) – 2	(Scotland) Hibernian	1–0	1–2
Leeds United (England)	7–2	(West Germany) Hannover 96	5–1	2–1
Legia Warsaw (Poland)	2–3	(Hungary) Újpest	0–1	2–2

=== First leg ===
18 December 1968

Vitória de Setúbal (Portugal)	3–0	(Italy) Fiorentina
José Maria 13' 52'; Arcanjo 36'

Estádio do Bonfim, Setúbal
Attendance: 10,000
Referee: Thomas Wharton (Scotland)

=== Second leg ===
22 January 1969

Fiorentina (Italy)	2–1	(Portugal) Vitória de Setúbal
Amarildo 12'; Rogora 36'		Mancin 90' (o.g.)

Stadio Comunale, Florence
Attendance: 7,000
Referee: Mario Clematide (Switzerland)

Vitória de Setúbal won 4–2 on aggregate.

== Quarter-finals ==
Team 1	Agg.	Team 2	1st leg	2nd leg
Rangers (Scotland)	4–3	(Spain) Athletic Bilbao	4–1	0–2
Newcastle United (England)	6–4	(Portugal) Vitória de Setúbal	5–1	1–3
Göztepe (Turkey)	w/o	(West Germany) Hamburger SV(withdrew)	–	–
Leeds United (England)	0–3	(Hungary) Újpest	0–1	0–2

=== First leg ===
12 March 1969

Newcastle United (England)	5–1	(Portugal) Vitória Setúbal
Foggon 23'; Robson 36', 75'; Davies 60'; Gibb 89'		José Maria 84'

St James' Park, Newcastle upon Tyne
Attendance: 57,662
Referee: Curt Liedberg (Sweden)

=== Second leg ===
26 March 1969

Vitória Setúbal (Portugal)	3–1	(England) Newcastle United
Arcanjo 27'; Petita 60'; Figueiredo 66'		Davies 40'

Estádio José Alvalade, Lisbon
Attendance: 35,000
Referee: Othmar Huber (Switzerland)

Newcastle United won 6–4 on aggregate.

== Semi-finals ==
Team 1	Agg.	Team 2	1st leg	2nd leg
Rangers (Scotland)	0–2	(England) Newcastle United	0–0	0–2
Göztepe (Turkey)	1–8	(Hungary) Újpest	1–4	0–4

=== First leg ===
14 May 1969

Rangers (Scotland)	0–0	(England) Newcastle United

23 April 1969

Göztepe (Turkey)	1–4	(Hungary) Újpest
Çağlayan 16' (pen.)		Bene 12' 32'; Dunai II 62' 82'

=== Second leg ===
21 May 1969

Newcastle United (England)	2–0	(Scotland) Rangers
Scott 52'; Sinclair 77'

Newcastle United won 2–0 on aggregate.

30 April 1969

Újpest (Hungary)	4–0	(Turkey) Göztepe
Bene 24' 55' 78'; Nagy 56'

Újpest won 8–1 on aggregate.

== Final ==
Team 1	Agg.	Team 2	1st leg	2nd leg
Newcastle United (England)	6–2	(Hungary) Újpest	3–0	3–2
