= List of German football champions =

German football championship (Deutsche Fußballmeisterschaft)
- Founded: 1903
- Replaced by: Bundesliga (since 1963–64)
- Country: Germany
- Number of clubs: 18
- Level on pyramid: Level 1
- Current champions: Bayern Munich (35th title) (2025–26)
- Most championships: Bayern Munich (35 titles)

The German football champions are the annual winners of the highest association football competition in Germany.

== History ==
The history of the German football championship is complex and reflects the turbulent history of the country through the course of the 20th century.

Brought to the country by English immigrants, the sport took root in the cities of Berlin, Hamburg, Stuttgart, and Leipzig in the 1890s, leading to the growth of city, regional, and academic leagues, each with its own championships. Following the establishment of the German Football Association (Deutscher Fußball Bund) in 1900, the first recognized national championship match was hosted by Hamburg club Altona 93 in 1903 in which VfB Leipzig defeated DFC Prag 7–2, and was awarded the Viktoria, the championship trophy from 1903 to 1944. Before the formation of the Bundesliga in 1963, the championship format was based on a knockout competition, contested between the winners of each of the country's top regional leagues. Since 1963, the first-place finisher in the Bundesliga has been recognized as the national champion.

Championship play was suspended twice; from 1915 to 1919 due to World War I and again from 1945 to 1947 due to World War II. Following World War II, Germany was occupied by the victorious Allies and two German football competitions emerged when the country was divided as a result. The historical tradition of the DFB was continued in what was known as The Federal Republic of Germany, while a second national championship was contested in the Soviet-controlled German Democratic Republic under the auspices of the DFV (Deutscher Fußball-Verband or German Football Federation). Following the reunification of the country in 1990, the two separate football competitions were merged and a single national championship was restored.

Bayern Munich hold the record for the most championships with 35, yet all but one of these (1932) come in Bundesliga competition. BFC Dynamo claimed 10 titles in the former East Germany, winning these championships in consecutive seasons (1979–88).

== Champions ==
=== Early German football championships (1903–1932) ===
The new British game of football quickly caught on in late 19th-century Germany, which had previously been a nation of gymnasts and fencers. The earliest attempt at organizing some form of national championship came in 1894, when city champions Viktoria 89 Berlin invited FC Hanau 93 to play a challenge match. The Hanauers were unable to afford the cost of the trip and so were unable to take up the invitation. In 2007, the 1894 final was replayed and Viktoria were crowned the official 1894 champions.

After its formation in 1900, the DFB began to establish its authority over the myriad city and regional leagues springing up throughout the country and organized the first officially recognized national championship in 1903.

The prize of German football was the Viktoria, a trophy statue of a seated Roman goddess of victory, donated by the committee that organized German participation in the 1900 Olympic Games in Paris – and originally intended to be shared with teams playing the rugby version of football. The formation of the DFB helped establish for the first time a clear divide between association football and its close cousin.

To qualify for the German championship finals, a club had to win one of the regional championships, which, in some cases, predate the national one. Those were:

- Southern German football championship – formed in 1898
- Brandenburg football championship – formed in 1898
- Central German football championship – formed in 1902
- Western German football championship – formed in 1903
- Northern German football championship – formed in 1906
- South Eastern German football championship – formed in 1906
- Baltic football championship – formed in 1908

One other regional championships briefly existed:

- March football championship – existed from 1903 to 1911

From 1925 onwards, the runners-up of those competitions were also qualified for the German championship finals, which had been expanded to sixteen clubs. The two strongest regions, South and West were also allowed to send their third-placed team. This system of regional championships was abolished in 1933 and superseded by the Gauliga system.

Season	Champions	Score	Runners-up	Venue
1903	VfB Leipzig (1)	7–2	Deutscher FC Prag	Altona
1904	No champions (unresolved protest, final not played per DFB)			Kassel
1905	Union 92 Berlin (1)	2–0	Karlsruher FV	Cologne
1906	VfB Leipzig (2)	2–1	1. FC Pforzheim	Nuremberg
1907	Freiburger FC (1)	3–1	Viktoria Berlin	Mannheim
1908	Viktoria Berlin (1)	3–0	Stuttgarter Kickers	Berlin
1909	Phönix Karlsruhe (1)	4–2	Viktoria Berlin	Breslau
1910	Karlsruher FV (1)	1–0 (a.e.t.)	Holstein Kiel	Cologne
1911	Viktoria Berlin (2)	3–1	VfB Leipzig	Dresden
1912	Holstein Kiel (1)	1–0	Karlsruher FV	Hamburg
1913	VfB Leipzig (3)	3–1	Duisburger SpV	Munich
1914	SpVgg Fürth (1)	3–2 (a.e.t.)	VfB Leipzig	Magdeburg
1915–1919	Suspended due to World War I			
1920	1. FC Nürnberg (1)	2–0	SpVgg Fürth	Frankfurt
1921	1. FC Nürnberg (2)	5–0	Berliner FC Vorwärts 1890	Düsseldorf
1922	No champions (title declined per DFB)	2–2 (a.e.t.); 1–1 (a.e.t.)	Hamburger SV; 1. FC Nürnberg	Berlin; Leipzig
1923	Hamburger SV (1)	3–0	Union Oberschöneweide	Berlin
1924	1. FC Nürnberg (3)	2–0	Hamburger SV	Berlin
1925	1. FC Nürnberg (4)	1–0 (a.e.t.)	FSV Frankfurt	Frankfurt
1926	SpVgg Fürth (2)	4–1	Hertha BSC	Frankfurt
1927	1. FC Nürnberg (5)	2–0	Hertha BSC	Berlin
1928	Hamburger SV (2)	5–2	Hertha BSC	Hamburg
1929	SpVgg Fürth (3)	3–2	Hertha BSC	Nuremberg
1930	Hertha BSC (1)	5–4	Holstein Kiel	Düsseldorf
1931	Hertha BSC (2)	3–2	TSV 1860 Munich	Cologne
1932	Bayern Munich (1)	2–0	Eintracht Frankfurt	Nuremberg

=== German football championships in Nazi Germany (1933–45) ===
With the beginning of the 1933–34 season, top-flight German football was reorganized into 16 regional Gauligen with each of these leagues sending their champion to the national playoffs. New Gauligen were created as the Reich expanded its border through the Anschluss with Austria. This expanded the national championship competition with the addition of regional champions from the new circuits. It also introduced previously foreign clubs into German domestic competition where Viennese Austrian sides made a notable impression. Competition during the war was also characterized by the formation of military-based clubs including the Luftwaffe side LSV Hamburg which appeared in the era's last national championship match at the end of the 1943–44 season. Unlike the United Kingdom, where play was suspended early on, national football competition continued on in Germany in some form through the course of the war. Play finally collapsed as the war drew to its conclusion and no champion was declared in 1944–45.

It was also during this period that a national cup competition was introduced; the Tschammerpokal was named for Reichssportführer (Sports Chief of the Reich) Hans von Tschammer und Osten and is predecessor to the modern-day DFB-Pokal (German Cup). The first cup competition was staged in 1935 and won by 1. FC Nürnberg.

Key

†	Champion also won Tschammerpokal

Season	Champions	Score	Runners-up	Venue
1933	Fortuna Düsseldorf (1)	3–0	Schalke 04	Cologne
1934	Schalke 04 (1)	2–1	1. FC Nürnberg	Berlin
1935	Schalke 04 (2)	6–4	VfB Stuttgart	Cologne
1936	1. FC Nürnberg (6)	2–1 (a.e.t.)	Fortuna Düsseldorf	Berlin
1937	Schalke 04 (3) †	2–0	1. FC Nürnberg	Berlin
1938	Hannover 96 (1)	3–3 (a.e.t.); 4–3 (a.e.t.)	Schalke 04	Berlin
1939	Schalke 04 (4)	9–0	Admira Wien	Berlin
1940	Schalke 04 (5)	1–0	Dresdner SC	Berlin
1941	Rapid Wien (1)	4–3	Schalke 04	Berlin
1942	Schalke 04 (6)	2–0	First Vienna	Berlin
1943	Dresdner SC (1)	3–0	FV Saarbrücken	Berlin
1944	Dresdner SC (2)	4–0	LSV Hamburg	Berlin
1945	Suspended due to World War II			

=== German football championships from post-war to the Bundesliga (1946–63) ===
In the immediate aftermath of World War II, German football was in complete disarray. Occupying Allied authorities ordered the dissolution of most organizations in the country.

However, many football clubs were soon re-established and new sides formed; play was tentatively resumed. By 1948, a new first division league structure, the Oberligen, was in place in most of the Western zone of occupation. The restored competition maintained the German game's historical practice of play in regional leagues. An exception was in French-occupied Saarland where attempts by France to annex the state were manifested in the formation of a separate, but short-lived, football competition that staged its own championship. Saarland briefly had its own representation under FIFA, forming Olympic and World Cup sides, before re-joining German competition in 1956.

In the Soviet-occupied East zone, a more enduring separation took place that was not mended until the reunification of Germany in 1990. As a result, Eastern-based clubs did not take part in the German national championship under the DFB, vying instead for a different prize. The country's capital city of Berlin was similarly divided and clubs based in West Berlin took part in western-based competition.

The Viktoria disappeared at war's end, although it would eventually reappear and be held in East Germany. A new trophy – the Meisterschale – was introduced in the west in 1949. The first post-war champions were 1. FC Nürnberg (2–1 over 1. FC Kaiserslautern in Köln) who were also, coincidentally, the first champions following World War I.

Over time, the notion of professionalism – long anathema to German sports – made inroads in the country. A consequence of this was that by 1956, a distinct national amateur championship was established, open to teams playing below the Oberliga level in second- and third tier leagues.

Season	Champions	Score	Runners-up	Venue
1946–1947	Suspended – Post-war regional play only			
1948	1. FC Nürnberg (7)	2–1	1. FC Kaiserslautern	Cologne
1949	VfR Mannheim (1)	3–2 (a.e.t.)	Borussia Dortmund	Stuttgart
1950	VfB Stuttgart (1)	2–1	Kickers Offenbach	Berlin
1951	1. FC Kaiserslautern (1)	2–1	Preußen Münster	Berlin
1952	VfB Stuttgart (2)	3–2	1. FC Saarbrücken	Ludwigshafen
1953	1. FC Kaiserslautern (2)	4–1	VfB Stuttgart	Berlin
1954	Hannover 96 (2)	5–1	1. FC Kaiserslautern	Hamburg
1955	Rot-Weiss Essen (1)	4–3	1. FC Kaiserslautern	Hannover
1956	Borussia Dortmund (1)	4–2	Karlsruher SC	Berlin
1957	Borussia Dortmund (2)	4–1	Hamburger SV	Hannover
1958	Schalke 04 (7)	3–0	Hamburger SV	Hannover
1959	Eintracht Frankfurt (1)	5–3 (a.e.t.)	Kickers Offenbach	Berlin
1960	Hamburger SV (3)	3–2	1. FC Köln	Frankfurt
1961	1. FC Nürnberg (8)	3–0	Borussia Dortmund	Hannover
1962	1. FC Köln (1)	4–0	1. FC Nürnberg	Berlin
1963	Borussia Dortmund (3)	3–1	1. FC Köln	Stuttgart

=== East German football championships (1950–90) ===
The post-war occupation of Germany by the victorious Allies eventually led to the de facto partition of the country and the emergence of two separate German states, each with its own government and institutions.

Early plans to maintain a national championship to be contested by representatives from the eastern and western halves of the country quickly fell by the wayside in the context of the Cold War. An Ostzone champion was declared in each of the 1946–48 seasons and in 1949 the first division DDR-Oberliga was established under the DFV (Deutscher Fußball-Verband der DDR) as a distinct national sport governing body. From 1950 through to 1990 an East German football champion was declared, until the eastern competition was reintegrated into the German national competition under the DFB.

In the first recognized East German national championship staged in 1949, ZSG Union Halle defeated SG Fortuna Erfurt 4–1. In 1990, the last East German champion was SG Dynamo Dresden. The following season the DDR-Oberliga (I) was redesignated the Nord-Ostdeutscher Fußball Verband Oberliga and became a third tier regional division within the existing German league structure under the DFB. FC Hansa Rostock captured the title in the transitional 1990–91 season, and alongside runners-up SG Dynamo Dresden, advanced to play in the Bundesliga, thereby fully integrating former Eastern clubs into a unified German championship.

The performance of various clubs is shown in the following table:

Season	Champion	Runner-up	Third Place	Top Scorer (Goals)
1948	SG Planitz (1)	SG Freiimfelde Halle	—	—
1949	ZSG Union Halle (1)	SG Fortuna Erfurt	—	—
1949–50	ZSG Horch Zwickau (2)	SG Friedrichstadt	BSG Waggonbau Dessau	(East Germany) Heinz Satrapa (23)
1950–51	BSG Chemie Leipzig (1)	BSG Turbine Erfurt	BSG Motor Zwickau	(East Germany) Johannes Schöne (37)
1951–52	BSG Turbine Halle (2)	SV Deutsche Volkspolizei Dresden	BSG Chemie Leipzig	(East Germany) Rudolf Krause (27)
1952–53	SG Dynamo Dresden (1)	BSG Wismut Aue	BSG Motor Zwickau	(East Germany) Harry Arlt (26)
1953–54	BSG Turbine Erfurt (1)	BSG Chemie Leipzig	SG Dynamo Dresden	(East Germany) Heinz Satrapa (21)
1954–55	SC Turbine Erfurt (2)	SC Wismut Karl-Marx-Stadt	SC Rotation Leipzig	(East Germany) Willy Tröger (22)
1955	SC Wismut Karl-Marx-Stadt	SC Empor Rostock	SC Dynamo Berlin	(East Germany) Klaus Seligow (12)
1956	SC Wismut Karl-Marx-Stadt (1)	SC Aktivist Brieske Senftenberg	SC Lokomotive Leipzig	(East Germany) Ernst Lindner (18)
1957	SC Wismut Karl-Marx-Stadt (2)	ASK Vorwärts Berlin	SC Rotation Leipzig	(East Germany) Heinz Kaulmann (15)
1958	ASK Vorwärts Berlin (1)	SC Motor Jena	SC Aktivist Brieske Senftenberg	(East Germany) Helmut Müller (17)
1959	SC Wismut Karl-Marx-Stadt (3)	ASK Vorwärts Berlin	SC Dynamo Berlin	(East Germany) Bernd Bauchspieß (18)
1960	ASK Vorwärts Berlin (2)	SC Dynamo Berlin	SC Lokomotive Leipzig	(East Germany) Bernd Bauchspieß (25)
1961–62	ASK Vorwärts Berlin (3)	SC Empor Rostock	SC Dynamo Berlin	(East Germany) Arthur Bialas (23)
1962–63	SC Motor Jena (1)	SC Empor Rostock	ASK Vorwärts Berlin	(East Germany) Peter Ducke (19)
1963–64	BSG Chemie Leipzig (2)	SC Empor Rostock	SC Leipzig	(East Germany) Gerd Backhaus (15)
1964–65	ASK Vorwärts Berlin (4)	SC Motor Jena	BSG Chemie Leipzig	(East Germany) Bernd Bauchspieß (14)
1965–66	FC Vorwärts Berlin (5)	FC Carl Zeiss Jena	1. FC Lokomotive Leipzig	(East Germany) Henning Frenzel (22)
1966–67	FC Karl-Marx-Stadt (1)	1. FC Lokomotive Leipzig	BSG Motor Zwickau	(East Germany) Hartmund Rentzsch (17)
1967–68	FC Carl Zeiss Jena (2)	F.C. Hansa Rostock	1. FC Magdeburg	(East Germany) Gerhard Kostmann (15)
1968–69	FC Vorwärts Berlin (6)	FC Carl Zeiss Jena	1. FC Magdeburg	(East Germany) Gerhard Kostmann (18)
1969–70	FC Carl Zeiss Jena (3)	FC Vorwärts Berlin	Dynamo Dresden	(East Germany) Otto Skrowny (12)
1970–71	Dynamo Dresden (2)	FC Carl Zeiss Jena	Hallescher FC Chemie	(East Germany) Hans-Jürgen Kreische (17)
1971–72	1. FC Magdeburg (1)	BFC Dynamo	Dynamo Dresden	(East Germany) Hans-Jürgen Kreische (14)
1972–73	Dynamo Dresden (3)	FC Carl Zeiss Jena	1. FC Magdeburg	(East Germany) Hans-Jürgen Kreische (26)
1973–74	1. FC Magdeburg (2)	FC Carl Zeiss Jena	Dynamo Dresden	(East Germany) Hans-Bert Matoul (20)
1974–75	1. FC Magdeburg (3)	FC Carl Zeiss Jena	Dynamo Dresden	(East Germany) Manfred Vogel (17)
1975–76	Dynamo Dresden (4)	BFC Dynamo	1. FC Magdeburg	(East Germany) Hans-Jürgen Kreische (24)
1976–77	Dynamo Dresden (5)	1. FC Magdeburg	FC Carl Zeiss Jena	(East Germany) Joachim Streich (17)
1977–78	Dynamo Dresden (6)	1. FC Magdeburg	BFC Dynamo	(East Germany) Klaus Havenstein (15)
1978–79	BFC Dynamo (1)	Dynamo Dresden	FC Carl Zeiss Jena	(East Germany) Joachim Streich (23)
1979–80	BFC Dynamo (2)	Dynamo Dresden	FC Carl Zeiss Jena	(East Germany) Dieter Kühn (21)
1980–81	BFC Dynamo (3)	FC Carl Zeiss Jena	1. FC Magdeburg	(East Germany) Joachim Streich (20)
1981–82	BFC Dynamo (4)	Dynamo Dresden	1. FC Lokomotive Leipzig	(East Germany) Rüdiger Schnuphase (19)
1982–83	BFC Dynamo (5)	FC Vorwärts Frankfurt	FC Carl Zeiss Jena	(East Germany) Joachim Streich (19)
1983–84	BFC Dynamo (6)	Dynamo Dresden	1. FC Lokomotive Leipzig	(East Germany) Rainer Ernst (20)
1984–85	BFC Dynamo (7)	Dynamo Dresden	1. FC Lokomotive Leipzig	(East Germany) Rainer Ernst (24)
1985–86	BFC Dynamo (8)	1. FC Lokomotive Leipzig	FC Carl Zeiss Jena	(East Germany) Ralf Sträßer (14)
1986–87	BFC Dynamo (9)	Dynamo Dresden	1. FC Lokomotive Leipzig	(East Germany) Frank Pastor (17)
1987–88	BFC Dynamo (10)	1. FC Lokomotive Leipzig	Dynamo Dresden	(East Germany) Andreas Thom (20)
1988–89	Dynamo Dresden (7)	BFC Dynamo	FC Karl-Marx-Stadt	(East Germany) Torsten Gütschow (17)
1989–90	Dynamo Dresden (8)	FC Karl-Marx-Stadt	1. FC Magdeburg	(East Germany) Torsten Gütschow (18)
1990–91	FC Hansa Rostock (1)	Dynamo Dresden	FC Rot-Weiß Erfurt	(Germany) Torsten Gütschow (20)

=== Bundesliga (since 1963) ===
The formation of the Bundesliga in 1963 marked a significant change to the German football championship. The historical regional league and national playoff format was abandoned in favour of a single unified national league. Sixteen teams from the five Oberligen in place at the time were invited to be part of the new circuit – which also for the first time formally acknowledged the sport as professional rather than amateur.

The new league adopted a round-robin format in which each team plays every other club once at home and once away. There is no playoff, with the club having the best record at the end of the season claiming the German championship. 1. FC Köln captured the first-ever Bundesliga title in the league's inaugural 1963–64 season. Since then the competition has been dominated by Bayern Munich, having taken the championship in 34 of the 62 Bundesliga seasons played to 2026.

Key

†	Double
*	Treble

Season	Champions	Runners-up	Third place	Top scorer(s)	Goals
1963–64	1. FC Köln (2)	Meidericher SV	Eintracht Frankfurt	Uwe Seeler	30
1964–65	Werder Bremen (1)	1. FC Köln	Borussia Dortmund	Rudi Brunnenmeier	24
1965–66	TSV 1860 Munich (1)	Borussia Dortmund	Bayern Munich	Friedhelm Konietzka	26
1966–67	Eintracht Braunschweig (1)	TSV 1860 Munich	Borussia Dortmund	Lothar Emmerich, Gerd Müller	28
1967–68	1. FC Nürnberg (9)	Werder Bremen	Borussia Mönchengladbach	Hannes Löhr	27
1968–69	Bayern Munich (2) †	Alemannia Aachen	Borussia Mönchengladbach	Gerd Müller	30
1969–70	Borussia Mönchengladbach (1)	Bayern Munich	Hertha BSC	Gerd Müller	38
1970–71	Borussia Mönchengladbach (2)	Bayern Munich	Hertha BSC	Lothar Kobluhn	24
1971–72	Bayern Munich (3)	Schalke 04	Borussia Mönchengladbach	Gerd Müller	40
1972–73	Bayern Munich (4)	1. FC Köln	Fortuna Düsseldorf	Gerd Müller	36
1973–74	Bayern Munich (5)	Borussia Mönchengladbach	Fortuna Düsseldorf	Josef Heynckes, Gerd Müller	30
1974–75	Borussia Mönchengladbach (3)	Hertha BSC	Hamburger SV	Josef Heynckes	27
1975–76	Borussia Mönchengladbach (4)	Hamburger SV	Bayern Munich	Klaus Fischer	29
1976–77	Borussia Mönchengladbach (5)	Schalke 04	Eintracht Braunschweig	Dieter Müller	34
1977–78	1. FC Köln (3) †	Borussia Mönchengladbach	Hertha BSC	Dieter Müller, Gerd Müller	24
1978–79	Hamburger SV (4)	VfB Stuttgart	1. FC Kaiserslautern	Klaus Allofs	22
1979–80	Bayern Munich (6)	Hamburger SV	VfB Stuttgart	Karl-Heinz Rummenigge	26
1980–81	Bayern Munich (7)	Hamburger SV	VfB Stuttgart	Karl-Heinz Rummenigge	29
1981–82	Hamburger SV (5)	1. FC Köln	Bayern Munich	Horst Hrubesch	27
1982–83	Hamburger SV (6)	Werder Bremen	VfB Stuttgart	Rudi Völler	23
1983–84	VfB Stuttgart (3)	Hamburger SV	Borussia Mönchengladbach	Karl-Heinz Rummenigge	26
1984–85	Bayern Munich (8)	Werder Bremen	1. FC Köln	Klaus Allofs	26
1985–86	Bayern Munich (9) †	Werder Bremen	Bayer Uerdingen	Stefan Kuntz	22
1986–87	Bayern Munich (10)	Hamburger SV	Borussia Mönchengladbach	Uwe Rahn	24
1987–88	Werder Bremen (2)	Bayern Munich	1. FC Köln	Jürgen Klinsmann	19
1988–89	Bayern Munich (11)	1. FC Köln	Werder Bremen	Thomas Allofs, Roland Wohlfarth	17
1989–90	Bayern Munich (12)	1. FC Köln	Eintracht Frankfurt	Jørn Andersen	18
1990–91	1. FC Kaiserslautern (3)	Bayern Munich	Werder Bremen	Roland Wohlfarth	21
1991–92	VfB Stuttgart (4)	Borussia Dortmund	Eintracht Frankfurt	Fritz Walter	22
1992–93	Werder Bremen (3)	Bayern Munich	Eintracht Frankfurt	Ulf Kirsten, Tony Yeboah	20
1993–94	Bayern Munich (13)	1. FC Kaiserslautern	Bayer Leverkusen	Stefan Kuntz, Tony Yeboah	18
1994–95	Borussia Dortmund (4)	Werder Bremen	Freiburg	Heiko Herrlich, Mario Basler	20
1995–96	Borussia Dortmund (5)	Bayern Munich	Schalke 04	Fredi Bobic	17
1996–97	Bayern Munich (14)	Bayer Leverkusen	Borussia Dortmund	Ulf Kirsten	22
1997–98	1. FC Kaiserslautern (4)	Bayern Munich	Bayer Leverkusen	Ulf Kirsten	22
1998–99	Bayern Munich (15)	Bayer Leverkusen	Hertha BSC	Michael Preetz	23
1999–2000	Bayern Munich (16) †	Bayer Leverkusen	Hamburger SV	Martin Max	19
2000–01	Bayern Munich (17)	Schalke 04	Borussia Dortmund	Sergej Barbarez, Ebbe Sand	22
2001–02	Borussia Dortmund (6)	Bayer Leverkusen	Bayern Munich	Márcio Amoroso, Martin Max	18
2002–03	Bayern Munich (18) †	VfB Stuttgart	Borussia Dortmund	Giovane Élber, Thomas Christiansen	21
2003–04	Werder Bremen (4) †	Bayern Munich	Bayer Leverkusen	Aílton	28
2004–05	Bayern Munich (19) †	Schalke 04	Werder Bremen	Marek Mintál	24
2005–06	Bayern Munich (20) †	Werder Bremen	Hamburger SV	Miroslav Klose	25
2006–07	VfB Stuttgart (5)	Schalke 04	Werder Bremen	Theofanis Gekas	20
2007–08	Bayern Munich (21) †	Werder Bremen	Schalke 04	Luca Toni	24
2008–09	VfL Wolfsburg (1)	Bayern Munich	VfB Stuttgart	Grafite	28
2009–10	Bayern Munich (22) †	Schalke 04	Werder Bremen	Edin Džeko	22
2010–11	Borussia Dortmund (7)	Bayer Leverkusen	Bayern Munich	Mario Gómez	28
2011–12	Borussia Dortmund (8) †	Bayern Munich	Schalke 04	Klaas-Jan Huntelaar	29
2012–13	Bayern Munich (23) *	Borussia Dortmund	Bayer Leverkusen	Stefan Kießling	25
2013–14	Bayern Munich (24) †	Borussia Dortmund	Schalke 04	Robert Lewandowski	20
2014–15	Bayern Munich (25)	VfL Wolfsburg	Borussia Mönchengladbach	Alexander Meier	19
2015–16	Bayern Munich (26) †	Borussia Dortmund	Bayer Leverkusen	Robert Lewandowski	30
2016–17	Bayern Munich (27)	RB Leipzig	Borussia Dortmund	Pierre-Emerick Aubameyang	31
2017–18	Bayern Munich (28)	Schalke 04	1899 Hoffenheim	Robert Lewandowski	29
2018–19	Bayern Munich (29) †	Borussia Dortmund	RB Leipzig	Robert Lewandowski	22
2019–20	Bayern Munich (30) *	Borussia Dortmund	RB Leipzig	Robert Lewandowski	34
2020–21	Bayern Munich (31)	RB Leipzig	Borussia Dortmund	Robert Lewandowski	41
2021–22	Bayern Munich (32)	Borussia Dortmund	Bayer Leverkusen	Robert Lewandowski	35
2022–23	Bayern Munich (33)	Borussia Dortmund	RB Leipzig	Niclas Füllkrug, Christopher Nkunku	16
2023–24	Bayer Leverkusen (1) †	VfB Stuttgart	Bayern Munich	Harry Kane	36
2024–25	Bayern Munich (34)	Bayer Leverkusen	Eintracht Frankfurt	Harry Kane	26
2025–26	Bayern Munich (35) †	Borussia Dortmund	RB Leipzig	Harry Kane	36

== Performances ==
Over the history of the German football championship, 30 different clubs have won the title. The most successful club is FC Bayern Munich, with 35 titles to its credit, 34 of those coming in Bundesliga competition. The most successful pre-Bundesliga club is 1. FC Nürnberg, who won eight titles in the era of knockout play amongst regional champions.

Former German champions are recognized through the Verdiente Meistervereine system which permits the display of a star or stars on a club's jersey. This system allows for the recognition of both German and East German titles, although only German titles are listed in the table below.

Clubs in bold currently play in the top division.

Clubs in italics with a † are no longer in existence.

Clubs with flags are based outside Germany and are no longer eligible because they play in their own domestic leagues.

=== Performance by club ===
Club	Winners	Runners-up	Winning seasons	Runners-up seasons
**Bayern Munich**	35	10	1932, 1968–69, 1971–72, 1972–73, 1973–74, 1979–80, 1980–81, 1984–85, 1985–86, 1986–87, 1988–89, 1989–90, 1993–94, 1996–97, 1998–99, 1999–2000, 2000–01, 2002–03, 2004–05, 2005–06, 2007–08, 2009–10, 2012–13, 2013–14, 2014–15, 2015–16, 2016–17, 2017–18, 2018–19, 2019–20, 2020–21, 2021–22, 2022–23, 2024–25, 2025–26	1969–70, 1970–71, 1987–88, 1990–91, 1992–93, 1995–96, 1997–98, 2003–04, 2008–09, 2011–12
1. FC Nürnberg	9	3	1920, 1921, 1924, 1925, 1927, 1936, 1948, 1961, 1967–68	1934, 1937, 1962
**Borussia Dortmund**	8	12	1956, 1957, 1963, 1994–95, 1995–96, 2001–02, 2010–11, 2011–12	1949, 1961, 1965–66, 1991–92, 2012–13, 2013–14, 2015–16, 2018–19, 2019–20, 2021–22, 2022–23, 2025–26
**Schalke 04**	7	10	1934, 1935, 1937, 1939, 1940, 1942, 1958	1933, 1938, 1941, 1971–72, 1976–77, 2000–01, 2004–05, 2006–07, 2009–10, 2017–18
**Hamburger SV**	6	8	1923, 1928, 1960, 1978–79, 1981–82, 1982–83	1924, 1957, 1958, 1975–76, 1979–80, 1980–81, 1983–84, 1986–87
**VfB Stuttgart**	5	5	1950, 1952, 1983–84, 1991–92, 2006–07	1935, 1953, 1978–79, 2002–03, 2023–24
**Borussia Mönchengladbach**	5	2	1969–70, 1970–71, 1974–75, 1975–76, 1976–77	1973–74, 1977–78
**Werder Bremen**	4	7	1964–65, 1987–88, 1992–93, 2003–04	1967–68, 1982–83, 1984–85, 1985–86, 1994–95, 2005–06, 2007–08
1. FC Kaiserslautern	4	4	1951, 1953, 1990–91, 1997–98	1948, 1954, 1955, 1993–94
**1. FC Köln**	3	7	1962, 1963–64, 1977–78	1960, 1963, 1964–65, 1972–73, 1981–82, 1988–89, 1989–90
Lokomotive Leipzig	3	2	1903, 1906, 1913	1911, 1914
Greuther Fürth	3	1	1914, 1926, 1929	1920
Hertha BSC	2	5	1930, 1931	1926, 1927, 1928, 1929, 1974–75
Viktoria Berlin	2	2	1908, 1911	1907, 1909
Dresdner SC	2	1	1943, 1944	1940
Hannover 96	2	—	1938, 1954	
**Bayer Leverkusen**	1	6	2023–24	1996–97, 1998–99, 1999–2000, 2001–02, 2010–11, 2024–25
Karlsruher FV	1	2	1910	1905, 1912
Holstein Kiel	1	2	1912	1910, 1930
1860 Munich	1	2	1965–66	1931, 1966–67
SpVg Blau-Weiß 90 Berlin	1	1	1905	1921
Karlsruher SC	1	1	1909	1956
Fortuna Düsseldorf	1	1	1933	1936
**Eintracht Frankfurt**	1	1	1959	1932
**VfL Wolfsburg**	1	1	2008–09	2014–15
Freiburger FC	1	—	1907	
(Austria) Rapid Wien	1	—	1941	
VfR Mannheim	1	—	1949	
Rot-Weiss Essen	1	—	1955	
Eintracht Braunschweig	1	—	1966–67	
1. FC Saarbrücken	—	2		1943, 1952
Kickers Offenbach	—	2		1950, 1959
**RB Leipzig**	—	2		2016–17, 2020–21
(Czech Republic) Deutscher FC Prag†	—	1		1903
1. CfR Pforzheim	—	1		1906
Stuttgarter Kickers	—	1		1908
Duisburger SpV	—	1		1913
**Union Berlin**	—	1		1923
FSV Frankfurt	—	1		1925
(Austria) FC Admira Wacker Mödling	—	1		1939
(Austria) First Vienna	—	1		1942
LSV Hamburg	—	1		1944
Preußen Münster	—	1		1951
MSV Duisburg	—	1		1963–64
Alemannia Aachen	—	1		1968–69

Titles won by club (%)
1. Bayern Munich – 35 (30.7%)
2. 1. FC Nürnberg – 9 (7.90%)
3. Borussia Dortmund – 8 (7.00%)
4. Schalke 04 – 7 (6.10%)
5. Hamburger SV – 6 (5.30%)
6. VfB Stuttgart – 5 (4.40%)
7. Borussia Mönchengladbach – 5 (4.40%)
8. Werder Bremen – 4 (3.50%)
9. 1. FC Kaiserslautern – 4 (3.50%)
10. 1. FC Köln – 3 (2.60%)
11. Lokomotive Leipzig – 3 (2.60%)
12. Greuther Fürth – 3 (2.60%)
13. Hertha BSC – 2 (1.80%)
14. Viktoria Berlin – 2 (1.80%)
15. Dresdner SC – 2 (1.80%)
16. Hannover 96 – 2 (1.80%)
17. Bayer Leverkusen – 1 (0.90%)
18. Karlsruher FV – 1 (0.90%)
19. Holstein Kiel – 1 (0.90%)
20. 1860 Munich – 1 (0.90%)
21. Spvgg Blau-Weiß 90 Berlin – 1 (0.90%)
22. Karlsruher SC – 1 (0.90%)
23. Fortuna Düsseldorf – 1 (0.90%)
24. Eintracht Frankfurt – 1 (0.90%)
25. VfL Wolfsburg – 1 (0.90%)
26. Freiburger FC – 1 (0.90%)
27. Rapid Wein – 1 (0.90%)
28. VfR Mannheim – 1 (0.90%)
29. Rot-Weiss Essen – 1 (0.90%)
30. Eintracht Braunschweig – 1 (0.90%)

Notes:

- A. VfB Leipzig would have faced Berliner TuFC, but no final was held.
- B. **^{a}** **^{b}** **^{c}** **^{d}** **^{e}** The German football championship was not held from 1915 to 1919 due to the First World War.
- C. The 1922 final between Hamburger SV and 1. FC Nürnberg ended 2–2. The match was called due to darkness after 189 minutes of play. The replay ended 1–1 when the referee called off the game while in extra time due to Nuremberg having just seven players remaining in the game. Hamburg was awarded the championship but later declined.
- D. **^{a}** **^{b}** **^{c}** The German football championship was not held from 1945 to 1947 due to the Second World War and its aftermath.
- E. ^{E} VfB Leipzig are now known as Lokomotive Leipzig.
- F. ^{F} Vienna was part of Germany when Rapid Wien won the championship in 1941.

=== Performance by state and regional association ===
As of 2026, German football champions have come from 11 of the 16 German states. The most successful state is Bavaria with 48 championships. Bavaria is also home to the two individually most successful clubs, Bayern Munich and 1. FC Nürnberg. North Rhine-Westphalia follows with 26 championships. The state is home to the third and fourth most successful clubs, Borussia Dortmund and Schalke 04. No club from the Saarland, Thuringia, Saxony-Anhalt, Brandenburg, and Mecklenburg-Vorpommern has yet won the championship.

In most cases the regional associations of the DFB align with state borders in Germany. However, the DFB has two regional associations in Rhineland-Palatinate, and three each in North Rhine-Westphalia and Baden-Württemberg. For the champions of these states the regional associations are mentioned as well. From 1938 to 1945 Austria was part of Germany, and Austrian clubs were thus allowed to compete in the German football championship. Rapid Wien won one championship in that period.

State	Winners	Club(s)
Bavaria	48	Bayern Munich (35), 1. FC Nürnberg (9), Greuther Fürth (3), 1860 Munich (1)
North Rhine-Westphalia	26	Westphalia (15): Borussia Dortmund (8), Schalke 04 (7); Lower Rhine (7): Borussia Mönchengladbach (5), Fortuna Düsseldorf (1), Rot-Weiß Essen (1); Middle Rhine (4): 1. FC Köln (3), Bayer Leverkusen (1)
Baden-Württemberg	9	Württemberg (5): VfB Stuttgart (5); Baden (3): Karlsruher FV (1), Karlsruher SC (1), VfR Mannheim (1); South Baden (1): Freiburger FC (1)
Hamburg	6	Hamburger SV (6)
Saxony	5	Lokomotive Leipzig (3), Dresdner SC (2)
Berlin	5	Hertha BSC (2), Viktoria Berlin (2), SpVgg Blau-Weiß 1890 Berlin (1)
Bremen	4	Werder Bremen (4)
Rhineland-Palatinate	4	South-Western Germany (4): 1. FC Kaiserslautern (4)
Lower Saxony	4	Hannover 96 (2), VfL Wolfsburg (1), Eintracht Braunschweig (1)
Schleswig-Holstein	1	Holstein Kiel (1)
Hesse	1	Eintracht Frankfurt (1)
Other	1	Austria (1): Rapid Wien (1)

== Undeclared championships ==
In over a century of German football competition, champions were not declared in several seasons for various reasons. No champion was declared in 1904 due to the DFB's inability to resolve a protest filed by Karlsruher FV over their 1–6 semi-final loss to Britannia Berlin to determine which of these sides would face defending champion Leipzig in that year's final. Karlsruhe's protest was over the failure to play the match at neutral venue.

The national championship was suspended in October 1915 due to World War I. Limited play continued on a regional basis in many parts of the country, while competition was abandoned in other areas. Several regional leagues continued to declare champions or cup winners. The national championship was reinstated with the 1919–20 season that was concluded with a 2–0 victory by 1. FC Nürnberg over SpVgg Fürth in Frankfurt.

The 1922 final was contested by 1. FC Nürnberg and Hamburger SV, but never reached a conclusion on the pitch. The match was called on account of darkness after three hours and ten minutes of play, drawn at 2–2. The re-match also went into extra time, and in an era that did not allow for substitutions, the game was called at 1–1 when Nürnberg was reduced to just seven players and the referee ruled they could not continue. Considerable wrangling ensued over the decision. The DFB awarded the win to Hamburg under the condition that they renounce the title in the name of "good sportsmanship" – which they grudgingly did. Ultimately, the championship trophy was not officially presented that year.

Competition for the national title was maintained through most of World War II and was supported by the regime for morale. Play became increasingly difficult as the war drew to its conclusion due to manpower shortages, bombed-out stadiums, and the hardship and expense of travel. In the era's final championship match Dresdner SC beat the military club LSV Hamburg 4–0 on 18 June 1944 in Berlin's Olympiastadion. The 1944–45 season kicked off ahead of schedule in November; however, by March 1945 play had collapsed throughout Germany as Allied armies overran the country. Play was tentatively resumed in various parts of the now-occupied country in early 1946 and the postwar Oberliga structure began to take shape in the 1946–47 season; no national champion was declared from 1945 to 1947. In 1947–48, qualification play took place to determine Westzonen (Western occupation zones) and Ostzone (Eastern occupation zone) representatives to meet in a national final that never took place. 1. FC Nürnberg is recognized as the first postwar German national champion for its 2–1 victory over 1. FC Kaiserslautern in the Westzonen final staged on 8 August 1948 in Mannheim. In the Ostzone, SG Planitz beat SG Freiimfelde Halle 1–0 on 4 July 1948 in Leipzig to qualify for the scheduled national final, but were denied a permit to travel to play the match by Soviet authorities.

== Other national championships ==
=== Workers' and Faith-based Leagues ===
In the aftermath of World War I, several lesser national football competitions emerged as outgrowths of the tumultuous German political situation. These included the left-leaning workers' ATSB (Arbeiter-Turn- und Sport-Bund), the Catholic-sponsored DJK (Deutschen Jugendkraft), the Protestant-backed DT (Deutsche Turnerschaft), and the Communist KG (Kampfgemeinschaft für Rote Sporteinheit). Through the 1920s and 1930s, each of these leagues staged their own national championships or fielded national sides. Because of the ideologies they represented, they were considered politically unpalatable by the regime and disappeared in the 1933 reorganization of German football under Nazi Germany that consolidated competition in state-sanctioned leagues. These clubs were forced into mergers with other mainstream sides or saw their assets seized by the state.

Antisemitism in Germany led to the creation of Jewish sports associations as Jews were forced out of mainstream clubs. These associations, including Sportbund Schild and Makkabi, staged their own national championships from 1933–38.

==== Arbeiter-Turn-und Sportbund (1920–1933) ====
Key

*	Match was replayed after a protest

Year	Champions	Score	Runners-up	Venue
1920	Tuspo Fürth	3–2	TuS Süden Forst	Leipzig
1921	VfL Leipzig-Stötteritz	3–0	Nordiska Berlin	Dresden
1922	VfL Leipzig-Stötteritz	4–1	BV 06 Cassel	Berlin
1923	VfL Leipzig-Stötteritz	(1–0) 3–2 *	Alemannia 22 Berlin	Dresden
1924	Dresdner SV 10	6–1	SV Stern Breslau	Dresden
1925	Dresdner SV 10	7–0	SV Stralau 10	Dresden
1926	Dresdner SV 10	5–1	TuS Süden Forst	Dresden
1927	Dresdner SV 10	4–1	TuS Nürnberg-West	Dresden
1928	Pankower 08 Adler	5–4	ASV Westend Frankfurt	Berlin
1929	Lorbeer 06 Hamburg	5–4	FT Döbern	Hamburg
1930	TuS 1930 Nürnberg-Ost	6–1	Bahrenfelder SV 19	Nuremberg
1931	Lorbeer 06 Hamburg	4–2	SpVgg 12 Pegau	Hamburg
1932	TuS Nürnberg-Ost	4–1	93 FT Cottbus	Nuremberg
1933	ATSB dissolved by Nazis in May 1933.			

==== Deutsche Jugendkraft (1921–1932) ====
Year	Champions	Score	Runners-up	Venue
1921	DJK Katernberg	3–2 (a.e.t.)	DJK Ludwigshafen	Düsseldorf
1924	DJK Katernberg	4–2	DJK Bürgel Sparta	Frankfurt am Main
1927	Sparta DJK Nürnberg	6–1	DJK TuS 08 Homberg-Hochheide	Köln
1932	Sparta DJK Nürnberg	5–2	DJK Adler Frintrop	Dortmund

==== Deutsche Turnerschaft (1925–1930) ====
Year	Champions	Score	Runners-up	Venue
1925	MTV Fürth	5–0	MTV Kiel	Hamburg
1926	MTV Fürth	3–2	Rotherburgsorter TV	Ulm
1927	TV 1861 Forst	6–0	TV 1846 Mannheim	Dresden
1928	Harburger TB	1–0	ATV Leipzig-Paunsdorf	Köln
1929	TV Mannheim 46	2–0	ATG Gera	Gera
1930	Kruppsche TG Essen	5–4	MTV Wilhelmsburg	Leipzig

Following the 1930 season, most DT teams became part of the mainstream DFB.

==== Kampfgemeinschaft für Rote Sporteinheit (1931–1933) ====
Year	Champions	Score	Runners-up	Venue
1931	Dresdner SV 10	3–2	Sparta 11 Berlin	—
1932	FT Jeßnitz	8–0	BV Gelsenkirchen 1912	—
1933	KG dissolved by Nazis in February 1933.			

== Participation of non-German clubs ==
German championships have included clubs from countries other than Germany. DFC Prag, vice-champions in the first national final and a founding member of the DFB, was an ethnically-German club from Bohemia in the Austro-Hungarian Empire (today part of the Czech Republic) which did not at the time have its own national football federation.

Following the annexation of Austria, which was incorporated into Nazi Germany in 1938, Austrian clubs became part of German competition; Admira Wien made a losing appearance in the German national final in 1939, Rapid Wien captured the championship in 1941, and First Vienna also lost in 1942. In each case their opposition was Schalke 04. Throughout the course of World War II, clubs in German-occupied territories were made part of German competition in the Gauligen and took part in the regional qualifying rounds of the national championship, but without the same success as Austrian sides.

== Trophies ==
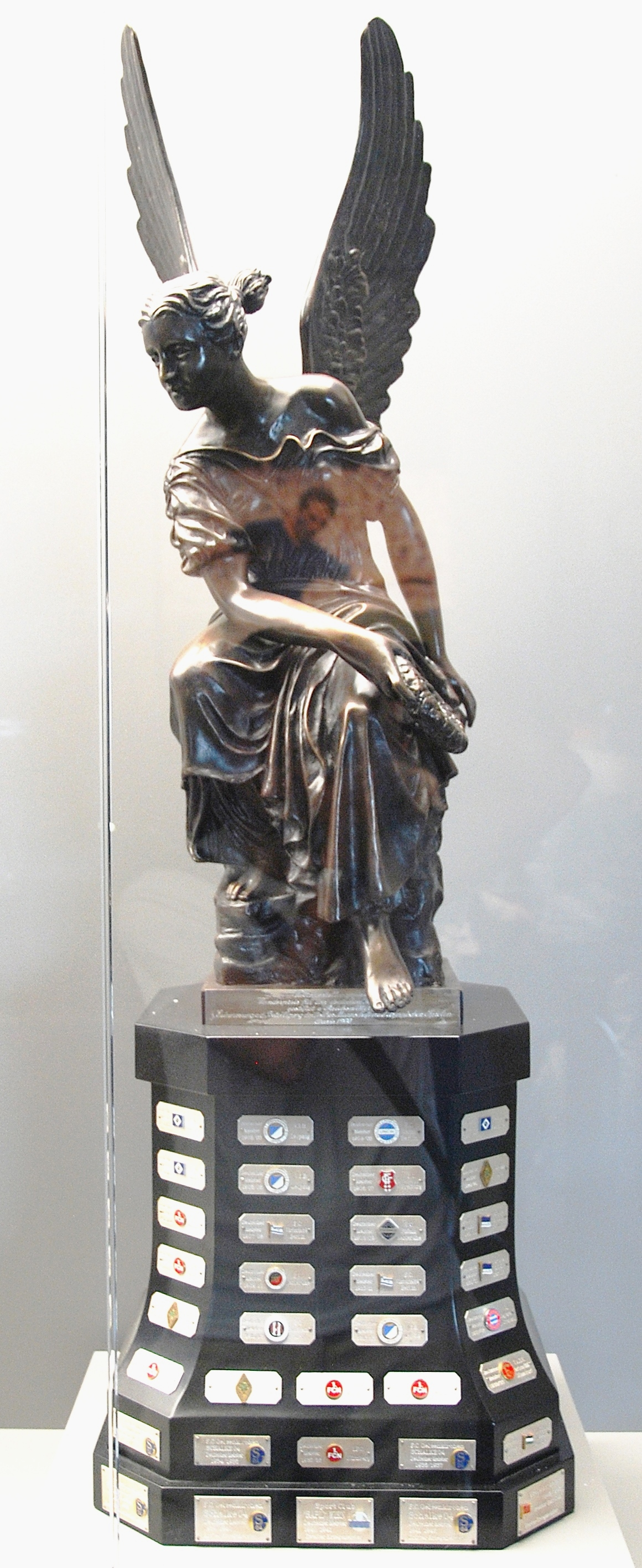
Replica of the Viktoria at the FC Schalke 04 museum

Two trophies have been used for the official German and, during the era of the divided Germany, West German champions. The pre-Second World War trophy, the Viktoria, was awarded from 1903 to 1944, making Saxonian clubs VfB Leipzig the first and Dresdner SC the last club to receive it. The trophy disappeared during the final stages of the war and would not resurface until after the German reunification. A new trophy, the Meisterschale, was commissioned after the war but was not ready for the first post-war champions in 1948. Instead it was first awarded to VfR Mannheim in 1949. While the original trophy has only the champions from 1903 to 1944 engraved the new one lists all the German champions since 1903 and has had to be enlarged on occasion.

== See also ==
- List of East German football champions
- Southern German football championship
- List of German women's football champions
- List of Bundesliga top scorers

== Bibliography ==
- Andreff, Wladimir; Stefan Szymanski (2006). Handbook on the Economics of Sport. Edward Elgar Publishing. ISBN 1-84376-608-6.
- Hesse-Lichtenberger, Ulrich (2003). Tor! The Story of German Football. WSC Books Limited. ISBN 0-9540134-5-X.
