= 1967–68 DDR-Oberliga =

DDR-Oberliga
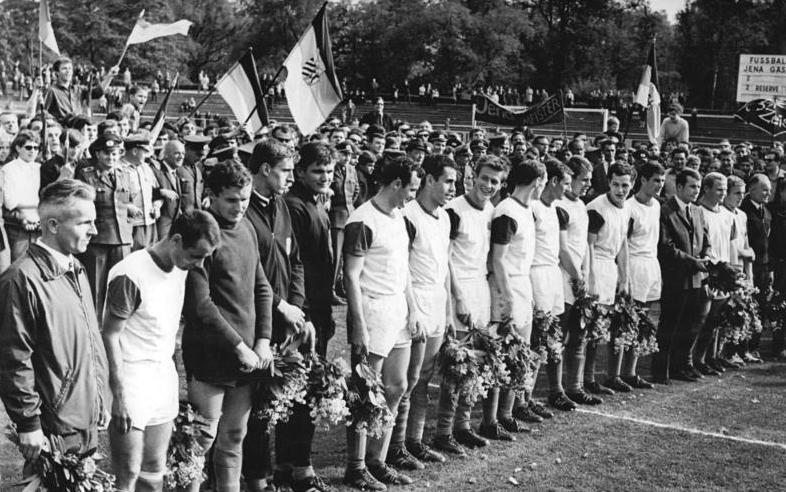
- 1967–68 East German champions FC Carl Zeiss Jena
- Season: 1967–68
- Champions: FC Carl Zeiss Jena
- Relegated: Dynamo Dresden; BSG Lokomotive Stendal
- European Cup: FC Carl Zeiss Jena
- European Cup Winners' Cup: 1. FC Union Berlin
- Inter-Cities Fairs Cup: 1. FC Lokomotive Leipzig; F.C. Hansa Rostock
- Matches: 182
- Goals: 474 (2.6 per match)
- Top goalscorer: Gerd Kostmann (15)
- Total attendance: 2,213,000
- Average attendance: 12,159

The 1967–68 DDR-Oberliga was the 19th season of the DDR-Oberliga, the first tier of league football in East Germany.

The league was contested by fourteen teams. FC Carl Zeiss Jena won the championship, the club's second of three East German championships, having previously won the 1962–63 edition under the name of SC Motor Jena.

Gerd Kostmann of F.C. Hansa Rostock was the league's top scorer with 15 goals, while Bernd Bransch of Hallescher FC Chemie won the seasons East German Footballer of the year award.

On the strength of the 1967–68 title Jena qualified for the 1968–69 European Cup where the club was drawn against Red Star Belgrade in the first round but withdrew after a redraw following the events of the Prague Spring. UEFA had drawn all Eastern European teams against each other to avoid a possible boycott by Western European clubs which, in turn, resulted in a boycott by the clubs from the Soviet Union, Poland, East Germany, Hungary and Bulgaria. Eighth-placed club 1. FC Union Berlin qualified for the 1968–69 European Cup Winners' Cup as the seasons FDGB-Pokal winner but withdrew for the same reasons. Fifth-placed 1. FC Lokomotive Leipzig qualified for the 1968–69 Inter-Cities Fairs Cup, a non-UEFA competition, where it was knocked out in the second round by Hibernian F.C. while second-placed F.C. Hansa Rostock was knocked out by Fiorentina, also in the second round.

Towards the end of the season BSG Motor Zwickau was renamed to BSG Sachsenring Zwickau, Sachsenring being both a race track and a car manufacturer in East Germany.

== Table ==
The 1967–68 season saw two newly promoted clubs 1. FC Magdeburg and FC Rot-Weiss Erfurt.

Pos	Team	Pld	W	D	L	GF	GA	GD	Pts	Qualification or relegation
1	FC Carl Zeiss Jena (C)	26	17	5	4	51	19	+32	39	Qualification to European Cup first round
2	F.C. Hansa Rostock	26	15	4	7	37	27	+10	34	Qualification to Inter-Cities Fairs Cup first round
3	1. FC Magdeburg	26	13	7	6	43	38	+5	33	
4	FC Vorwärts Berlin	26	9	10	7	34	29	+5	28	
5	1. FC Lokomotive Leipzig	26	9	7	10	39	35	+4	25	Qualification to Inter-Cities Fairs Cup first round
6	FC Karl-Marx-Stadt	26	8	9	9	33	30	+3	25	
7	BSG Sachsenring Zwickau	26	11	3	12	36	34	+2	25	
8	1. FC Union Berlin	26	9	7	10	26	35	−9	25	Qualification to Cup Winners' Cup first round
9	FC Rot-Weiss Erfurt	26	8	7	11	34	39	−5	23	
10	Hallescher FC Chemie	26	8	7	11	32	41	−9	23	
11	BSG Wismut Aue	26	9	4	13	32	40	−8	22	
12	BSG Chemie Leipzig	26	7	7	12	26	32	−6	21	
13	SG Dynamo Dresden (R)	26	5	11	10	25	33	−8	21	Relegation to DDR-Liga
14	BSG Lokomotive Stendal (R)	26	7	6	13	26	42	−16	20	Relegation to DDR-Liga

(C) Champions; (R) Relegated

== Results ==
Home \ Away	CZJ	CHM	DRE	HFC	HRO	KMS	LLE	LST	MAG	RWE	SZW	UNI	VBE	AUE
Carl Zeiss Jena		2–0	2–0	2–0	4–1	2–0	3–1	1–0	1–0	1–0	2–0	3–0	3–0	3–1
Chemie Leipzig	0–2		0–0	1–0	1–1	1–0	3–1	0–1	1–2	2–0	3–0	5–2	1–0	1–1
Dynamo Dresden	2–2	1–1		0–0	0–1	2–0	1–1	4–1	1–1	1–2	2–0	3–1	0–0	1–4
Hallescher FC Chemie	2–2	2–2	0–0		0–2	1–0	4–2	1–0	1–3	3–2	2–1	1–0	0–2	4–0
Hansa Rostock	2–1	2–1	1–1	3–1		1–0	2–0	2–0	3–2	1–0	3–0	1–0	0–1	2–1
Karl-Marx-Stadt	0–4	1–0	1–1	1–1	3–0		0–1	2–0	1–0	2–2	5–2	3–2	1–1	5–0
Lokomotive Leipzig	0–0	3–1	2–1	5–1	2–2	2–2		4–1	4–1	3–0	1–0	0–1	1–1	0–2
Lokomotive Stendal	1–4	2–0	0–0	2–0	2–3	1–1	1–1		0–0	4–2	2–0	0–2	2–0	2–1
1. FC Magdeburg	3–2	1–0	2–0	3–2	1–0	1–1	2–0	3–2		3–3	1–2	1–1	3–1	1–0
Rot-Weiß Erfurt	2–1	1–1	1–2	1–1	1–0	2–1	0–3	3–0	1–1		1–2	3–0	2–0	5–1
Sachsenring Zwickau	1–2	1–0	2–1	0–0	1–0	2–2	2–0	4–0	5–0	5–0		1–2	2–1	0–1
Union Berlin	0–0	0–0	2–1	3–1	2–1	0–1	1–0	0–0	2–3	1–0	1–1		1–0	1–5
Vorwärts Berlin	3–2	2–1	4–0	3–0	1–1	0–0	2–2	1–1	3–3	0–0	2–1	1–1		3–0
Wismut Aue	0–0	4–0	2–0	1–4	1–2	1–0	1–0	3–1	1–2	0–0	0–1	0–0	1–2	

Legend: Blue = home team win; Yellow = draw; Red = away team win.

== Attendances ==
#	Football club	Average attendance
1	SG Dynamo Dresden	19,615
2	Hansa Rostock	15,808
3	FC Karl-Marx-Stadt	15,692
4	Hallescher FC Chemie	15,231
5	RW Erfurt	14,269
6	1. FC Magdeburg	13,962
7	Chemie Leipzig	12,885
8	Lokomotive Leipzig	10,769
9	Sachsenring Zwickau	10,000
10	FC Carl Zeiss Jena	9,923
11	1. FC Union Berlin	9,308
12	Wismut Aue	9,077
13	Vorwärts Berlin	7,238
14	Lokomotive Stendal	6,038
