= Zafer Yelen =

Turkish footballer (born 1986)

Personal information
- Full name: Zafer Yelen
- Date of birth: 30 August 1986 (age 40)
- Place of birth: Berlin, Germany
- Height: 1.80 m (5 ft 11 in)
- Position: Midfielder

Team information
- Current team: MSV Normannia 08
- Number: 37

Youth career
- 1993–1996: MSV Normannia 08
- 1996–1998: Reinickendorfer Füchse
- 1998: Türkiyemspor Berlin
- 1998–2005: Tennis Borussia Berlin

Senior career*
Years	Team	Apps	(Gls)
2005–2009	Hansa Rostock II	36	(14)
2006–2009	Hansa Rostock	48	(5)
2009–2011	Trabzonspor	0	(0)
2011–2015	FSV Frankfurt	67	(14)
2015–2016	Berliner AK 07	23	(7)
2016–2017	Wacker Nordhausen	5	(0)
2017–2018	Wacker Nordhausen II	7	(3)
2019	FC Brandenburg	4	(1)
2019–	MSV Normannia 08	15	(27)

International career
2007–2009	Turkey U21	12	(3)

Managerial career
- 2020–: MSV Normannia 08 II
- * Club domestic league appearances and goals as of 18 February 2021

Zafer Yelen (born 30 August 1986) is a Turkish footballer who plays for MSV Normannia 08.

== Career ==
=== Club career ===
Yelen was born in Berlin, Germany. He played for various clubs in Berlin, most recently for Tennis Borussia Berlin in the Junior League East, where he was discovered by the former Hansa Rostock coach Frank Pagelsdorf. He then got Timo Lange, the coach of the league, to transfer him to FC Hansa. In the 2005–06 season, his first season in the adult area, Yelen scored 14 goals in 30 games for the second string Rostock team in the league. For the 2006–07 season, he advanced to the second division team where he was a regular player and his playmaking skills developed. He scored five goals in 26 starts and was promoted at the end of the season with Hansa Rostock to the Bundesliga.

Through his achievements in the second division he was also appointed to the Turkish national under-21 team and played on 7 February 2007 in his first game for them.

In the following 2007–08 Bundesliga season, Yelen completed 20 games for the Baltic city dwellers, but was immediately relegated to the second Bundesliga, whereupon Yelen initially sought a change in Turkey, which for lack of sufficient financial security did not come about. After the 2008–09 season with just two appearances for Hansa he tried again to force a change in Turkey. End of the season his contract was finally cancelled in Rostock, and Yelen moved to the Turkish first division side Trabzonspor. In July 2011, Yelen joined second division club FSV Frankfurt.

== International ==
He was a member of the Turkish U-21 national team. He played twice in 2008 Toulon Tournament and five times in the 2009 UEFA European Under-21 Football Championship qualification.
