= Martin Dwars =

German Goalkeeper

Personal information
- Full name: Martin Dwars
- Date of birth: 17 December 1987 (age 38)
- Place of birth: Jena, East Germany
- Height: 1.88 m (6 ft 2 in)
- Position: Goalkeeper

Youth career
- 1994–2005: FC Carl Zeiss Jena

Senior career*
| Years | Team | Apps | (Gls) |
| 2006–2010 | FC Carl Zeiss Jena II | 35 | (0) |
| 2008–2010 | FC Carl Zeiss Jena | 1 | (0) |
| 2010–2011 | FC Pommern Greifswald | | |
| 2011–2012 | 1. FC Neubrandenburg 04 | 2 | (0) |
| 2012–2013 | SV Waren 09 | 4 | (0) |
| 2013–2014 | Motor Süd Neubrandenburg | | |
| 2014–2017 | VfB Berlin-Friedrichshain | 91 | (1) |
| 2017–2018 | Berolina Stralau | 27 | (0) |
| Total | | 160 | (1) |
- * Club domestic league appearances and goals

Martin Dwars (born 17 December 1987) is a German retired goalkeeper.

== See also ==
- Football in Germany
- List of football clubs in Germany
