= 1968–69 DDR-Oberliga =

DDR-Oberliga
- Season: 1968–69
- Champions: FC Vorwärts Berlin
- Relegated: 1. FC Union Berlin; 1. FC Lokomotive Leipzig
- European Cup: FC Vorwärts Berlin
- European Cup Winners' Cup: 1. FC Magdeburg
- Inter-Cities Fairs Cup: FC Carl Zeiss Jena; F.C. Hansa Rostock
- Matches: 182
- Goals: 456 (2.51 per match)
- Top goalscorer: Gerd Kostmann (18)
- Total attendance: 2,111,000
- Average attendance: 11,599

The 1968–69 DDR-Oberliga was the 20th season of the DDR-Oberliga, the first tier of league football in East Germany.

The league was contested by fourteen teams. National People's Army club FC Vorwärts Berlin won the championship, the club's last of six East German championships. It marked, together with a cup win in the following season, the last highlight in the club's history as, two seasons later, Vorwärts was moved from East Berlin to Frankfurt/Oder for political reasons and never again won another national title after the move.

Gerd Kostmann of F.C. Hansa Rostock was the league's top scorer with 18 goals, while Eberhard Vogel of FC Karl-Marx-Stadt won the seasons East German Footballer of the year award.

On the strength of the 1968–69 title Vorwärts qualified for the 1969–70 European Cup where the club was knocked out by Feyenoord in the quarter-finals. Third-placed club 1. FC Magdeburg qualified for the 1969–70 European Cup Winners' Cup as the seasons FDGB-Pokal winner and was knocked out by Académica de Coimbra in the second round. Second-placed FC Carl Zeiss Jena qualified for the 1969–70 Inter-Cities Fairs Cup where it was knocked out in the quarter-finals by Ajax while fourth-placed F.C. Hansa Rostock was knocked out by Inter Milan in the second round.

== Table ==
The 1968–69 season saw two newly promoted clubs Berliner FC Dynamo and BSG Stahl Riesa.

Pos	Team	Pld	W	D	L	GF	GA	GD	Pts	Qualification or relegation
1	FC Vorwärts Berlin (C)	26	15	4	7	47	28	+19	34	Qualification to European Cup first round
2	FC Carl Zeiss Jena	26	13	6	7	43	22	+21	32	Qualification to Inter-Cities Fairs Cup first round
3	1. FC Magdeburg	26	13	5	8	43	41	+2	31	Qualification to Cup Winners' Cup first round
4	F.C. Hansa Rostock	26	10	9	7	42	33	+9	29	Qualification to Inter-Cities Fairs Cup first round
5	BSG Sachsenring Zwickau	26	10	7	9	23	19	+4	27	
6	BSG Chemie Leipzig	26	8	11	7	30	27	+3	27	
7	FC Karl-Marx-Stadt	26	10	6	10	35	36	−1	26	
8	FC Rot-Weiss Erfurt	26	10	5	11	32	27	+5	25	
9	BSG Wismut Aue	26	9	7	10	33	31	+2	25	
10	Berliner FC Dynamo	26	10	5	11	25	36	−11	25	
11	Hallescher FC Chemie	26	6	10	10	32	35	−3	22	
12	BSG Stahl Riesa	26	9	4	13	26	43	−17	22	
13	1. FC Union Berlin (R)	26	6	8	12	29	41	−12	20	Relegation to DDR-Liga
14	1. FC Lokomotive Leipzig (R)	26	5	9	12	17	38	−21	19	Relegation to DDR-Liga

(C) Champions; (R) Relegated

== Results ==
Home \ Away	BFC	CZJ	CHM	HFC	HRO	KMS	LOK	MAG	RWE	SZW	STR	UNI	VBE	AUE
Berliner FC Dynamo		2–1	2–1	1–0	1–3	1–0	2–1	0–1	1–0	1–1	3–1	1–1	1–2	0–0
Carl Zeiss Jena	4–0		2–2	3–2	3–0	2–0	3–0	3–1	1–0	0–1	3–0	6–0	2–0	1–0
Chemie Leipzig	2–0	0–0		3–1	1–1	1–1	1–0	2–1	2–0	2–1	1–0	1–2	0–0	3–1
Hallescher FC Chemie	2–0	1–1	2–2		1–1	2–0	1–1	4–1	2–0	0–1	3–0	0–2	1–2	2–2
Hansa Rostock	1–0	4–4	2–2	1–1		1–2	5–0	0–1	1–1	0–1	1–0	1–1	3–1	3–1
Karl-Marx-Stadt	1–2	1–0	1–0	0–0	3–4		3–0	3–0	0–0	1–1	3–1	2–2	2–2	2–3
Lokomotive Leipzig	0–1	0–0	0–0	1–0	1–1	1–2		1–3	1–0	1–0	1–1	2–0	2–0	1–1
1. FC Magdeburg	4–1	0–0	3–1	2–1	1–1	3–1	2–0		1–2	2–0	3–1	2–1	4–3	3–2
Rot-Weiß Erfurt	2–1	2–1	1–1	5–2	0–0	1–0	3–0	6–1		1–0	4–0	0–0	4–0	0–2
Sachsenring Zwickau	1–2	0–0	0–0	0–0	1–0	0–1	3–0	0–0	1–0		4–2	0–1	1–0	2–0
Stahl Riesa	4–0	1–2	1–0	1–1	0–2	2–1	1–1	2–0	1–0	2–1		1–0	1–0	1–1
Union Berlin	1–1	1–2	1–1	0–1	3–4	1–2	1–1	3–3	2–0	2–3	2–0		0–2	2–1
Vorwärts Berlin	2–1	1–0	3–1	1–1	3–1	5–1	3–0	0–0	5–0	1–0	6–1	2–0		2–1
Wismut Aue	0–0	3–2	1–0	4–1	3–1	1–2	0–0	3–1	1–0	0–0	0–1	2–0	0–1	

Legend: Blue = home team win; Yellow = draw; Red = away team win.
