= Saint-Nolff =

Saint-Nolff Sant-Nolf
- Commune
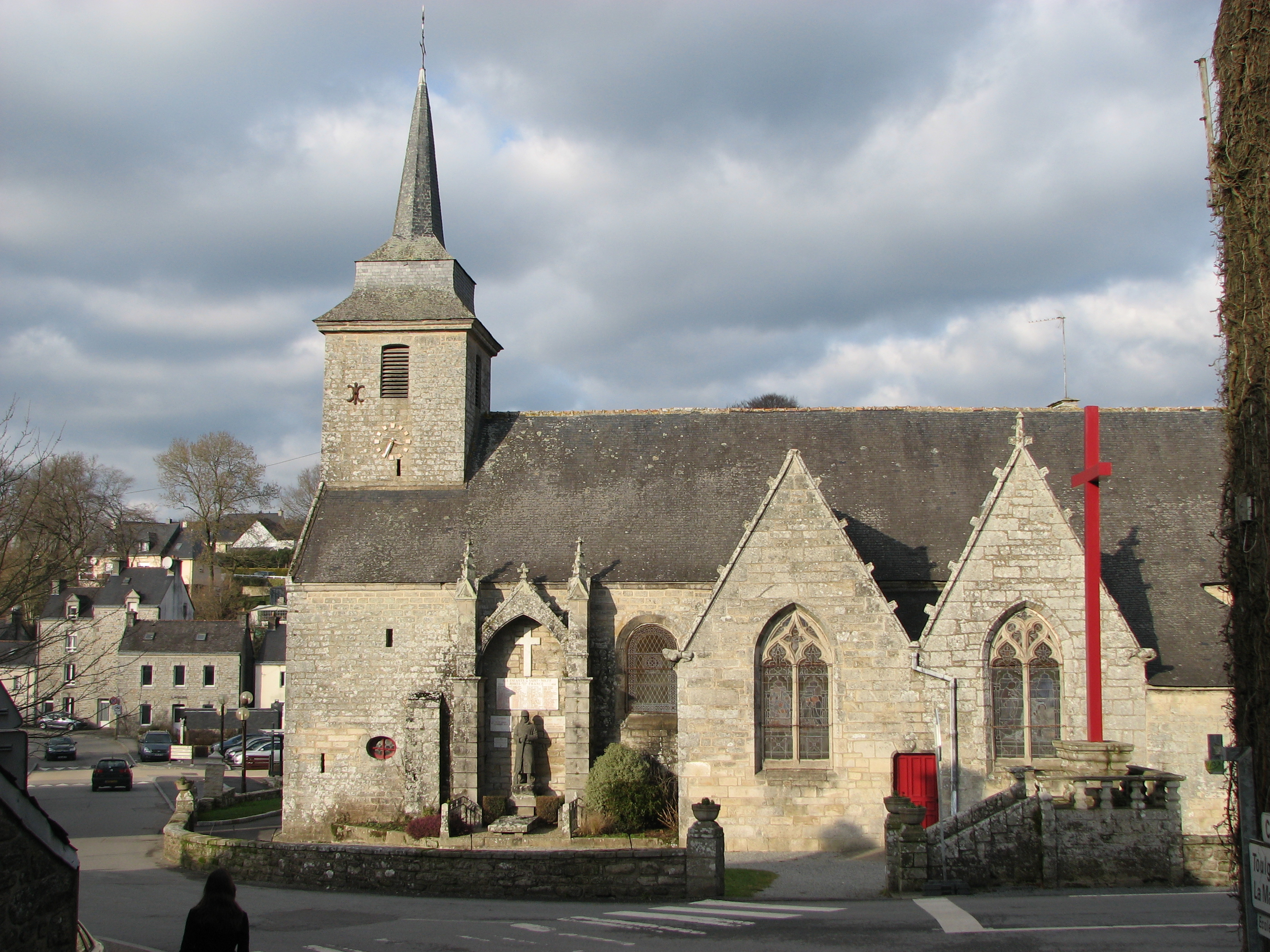
- Saint-Mayeul's church in Saint-Nolff

- Coat of arms
- Location of Saint-Nolff
- Location within France Location within Brittany
- Coordinates: 47°42′16″N 2°39′01″W
- Country: France
- Region: Brittany
- Department: Morbihan
- Arrondissement: Vannes
- Canton: Vannes-3
- Intercommunality: Golfe du Morbihan - Vannes Agglomération

Government
  - Mayor (2026–32): Karine Albanhac
- Area^{1}: 25.92 km^{2} (10.01 sq mi)
- Highest elevation: 147 m (482 ft)
- Lowest elevation: 19 m (62 ft)
- Population (2023): 3,990
  - Density: 154/km^{2} (399/sq mi)
- Time zone: UTC+01:00 (CET)
  - Summer (DST): UTC+02:00 (CEST)
- INSEE/Postal code: 56231 /56250
- ^{1} French Land Register data, which excludes lakes, ponds, glaciers > 1 km^{2} (0.386 sq mi or 247 acres) and river estuaries.

Saint-Nolff (French pronunciation: [sɛ̃ nɔlf]; Breton: Sant-Nolf) is a commune in the Morbihan department of Brittany in north-western France.

== Population ==
Historical population
| Year | Pop. | ±% p.a. |
|---|---|---|
| 1968 | 1,082 | — |
| 1975 | 1,830 | +7.80% |
| 1982 | 2,537 | +4.78% |
| 1990 | 3,270 | +3.22% |
| 1999 | 3,300 | +0.10% |
| 2007 | 3,603 | +1.10% |
| 2012 | 3,689 | +0.47% |
| 2017 | 3,779 | +0.48% |
| 2023 | 3,990 | +0.91% |
Source: INSEE

Inhabitants of Saint-Nolff are called in French Nolfféens.

== Heraldry ==

Vairé d'or et de sable; au franc-canton de gueules à l'aigle d'argent, becqué, membré et lampassé d'or.

("Colour of gold and yellow; "canton-fair" in red and eagle in white, with gold beak, legs carved and langued in gold")

== Twin towns ==
Saint-Nolff is twinned with:

- Pedrajas de San Esteban, Spain, since 1991

== Buildings ==
Saint-Mayeul's church (French: église Saint-Mayeul) was built in the 16th century.

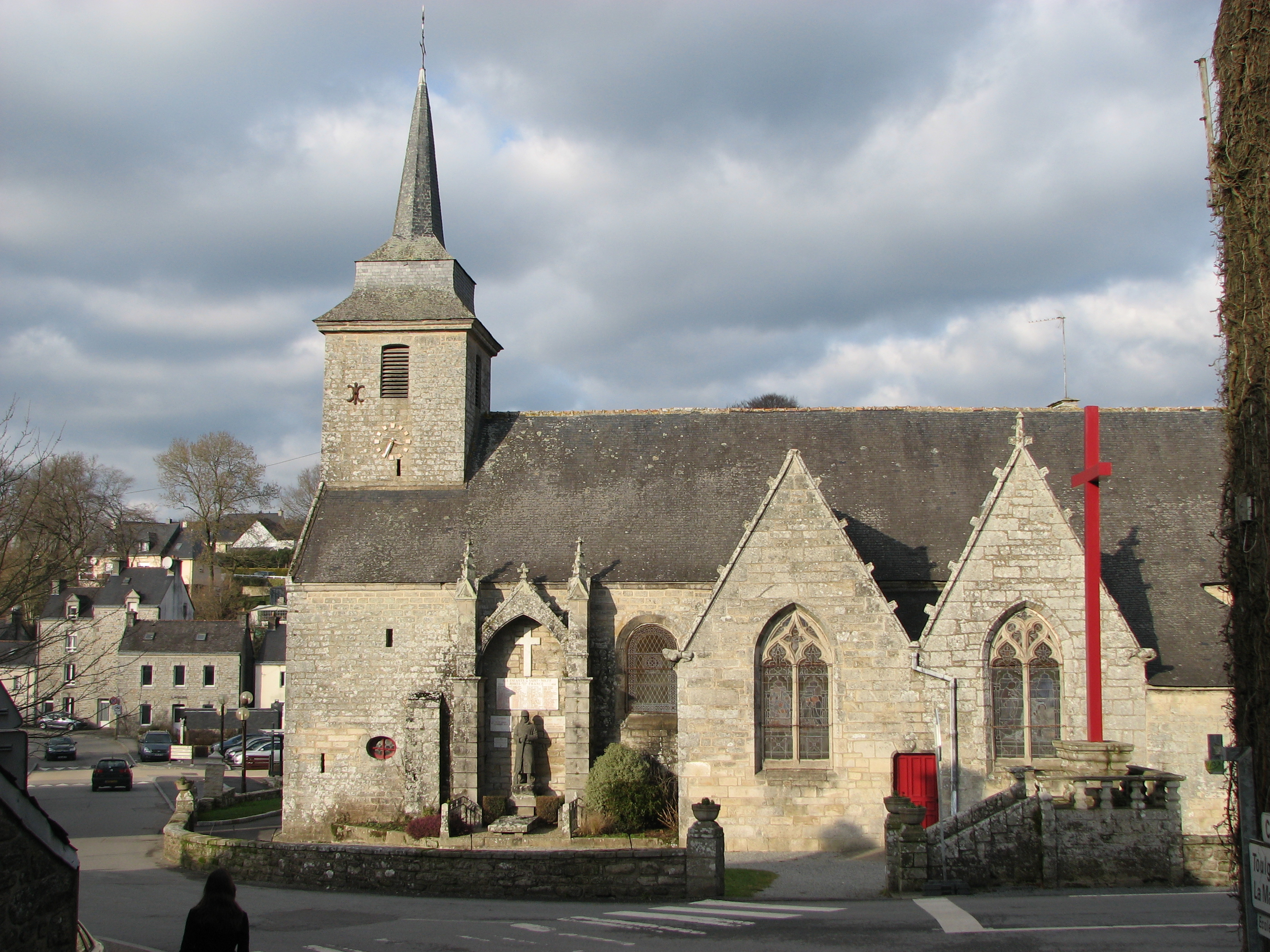
Saint Mayeul's church

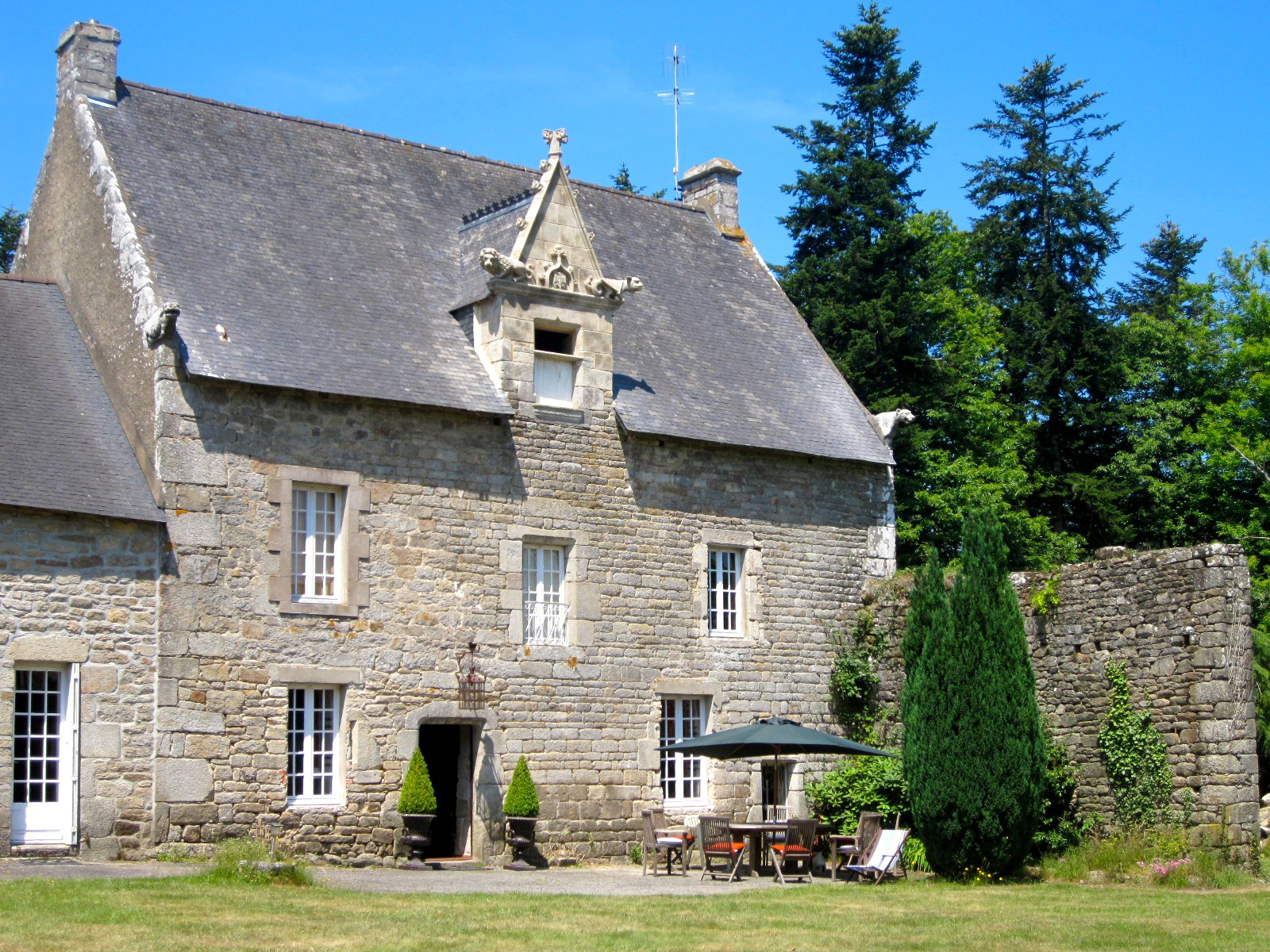
Kerboulard manor

== See also ==
- Communes of the Morbihan department
