= Nordiska Berlin =

German football club

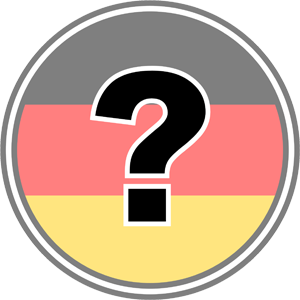
- Full name: Berliner Fußballclub Nordiska
- Founded: 1913
- League: defunct
Home colours	Away colours

Nordiska Berlin was a German association football club from the city of Berlin.

== History ==
Established sometime in 1913, the team was part of the ATSB (Arbeiter-Turn- und Sportbund, en:Workers Gymnastics and Sports Federation), a leftist national sports organization which organized a football competition and championship separate from that of the DFB (Deutscher Fußball Bund, en:German Football Association).

Nordiska took part in the ATSB championship in 1921, beating FT Breslau-Süd 2:1 in a quarterfinal match, before getting through the semifinal past FT Unterweser 3:2 in overtime. They lost the title match 0:3 VfL Leipzig-Südost. Under the Nazis, worker's clubs such as Nordiska were banned in 1933, alongside other clubs with political or religious affiliations.

Following World War II, occupying Allied authorities banned organizations throughout the country, including sports and football clubs, as part of the process of de-Nazification. New clubs began to emerge shortly after the war and the former memberships of Nordiska and Berliner SC Normannia became part of Sportgruppe Nordost which, after the re-establishment of Normannia in 1950, gave rise to present-day club MSV Normannia 08.
