= SSV Stötteritz =

German football club

- Founded: 1892
- Ground: Südost-Stadion Stötteritz
- Capacity: 10,260
- Manager: Olaf Schöler
- League: Stadtliga Leipzig (VIII)
- 2018–19: Stadtklasse (IX), 2nd ↑
Home colours	Away colours

SSV Stötteritz is a German association football club from the city district of Stötteritz in southeast Leipzig, Saxony. It is the successor side to VfL Leipzig-Südost, which captured three national titles in the Arbeiter-Turn- und Sportbund (ATSB or Workers' Gymnastics and Sports Federation) in the early 1920s. The ATSB was a leftist national sports organization which organized a football competition and championship separate from that of the DFB (Deutscher Fußball Bund, en:German Football Association).

== History ==
SSV has its roots in the establishment of a gymnastics department within a workers' sports club that would later go on to become separate sports club. A football department was formed in 1911 as part of what was later known as Arbeiter Turn- und Sportverein Stötteritz. The footballers captured their first ATSB championship in 1921 by defeating Nordiska Berlin 3:0. The following season they returned to the league final where they beat BV 06 Cassel 4:1. Their last title came in 1923 versus Alemannia 22 Berlin in a match that had to be replayed after the Berlin side protested following their 1:0 loss. Stötteritz won the rematch 3:1.

The team merged with Freie Turnerschaft Südost Leipzig on 1 March 1924 to create Verein für Leibesübungen Leipzig-Südost and was then absent from the national scene until 1929 when they advanced as far as the ATSB semi-finals where they were put out by FT Döbern. The club was displaced as the dominant side in the ATSB by Dresdner SV 10, which won four consecutive titles from 1924 to 1927 before leaving to play in a separate workers' league known as the Kampfgemeinschaft für Rote Sporteinheit. VfL disappeared in 1933 under the Nazis, who banned workers' and faith-based clubs as politically unpalatable, with the membership going to Sportverein Südost Leipzig.

Following World War II, the club was re-established as SG Stötteritz and became part of the separate football competition that emerged in Soviet-occupied East Germany. They played variously as BSG Stern Südost Leipzig, BSG Mechanik Südost Leipzig, and BSG Motor Südost Leipzig within the industry-sponsored Betriebssportgemeinschaft system. In 1956, the club became part of BSG Motor Stötteritz. On 19 June 1990, following German reunification, Motor adopted the name SSV Stötteritz and currently play lower-tier football in the city-based Stadtliga Leipzig (VIII).

== Honours ==
- ATSB championship
  - Champions: 1921, 1922, 1923
