= BFC Alemannia 22 =

German football club

Alemannia 22 Berlin
- Full name: Berliner Fußball-Club Allemannia 1922
- Founded: 1922
Home colours	Away colours

Alemannia 22 Berlin was a short-lived German association football club from the city of Berlin. The club was also known as Neuköllner FC Alemannia after the Neukölln district of the city where it was based.

Alemannia was a workers' side that was part of the Arbeiter-Turn- und Sportbund (ATSB Worker's Gymnastics and Sports Federation), a leftist national organization that was active from 1893–1933 until banned under the Nazi regime as politically undesirable. The ATSB staged a football competition and championship separate from that of the DFB (Deutscher Fußball Bund, en:German Football Association) from 1920 to 1933.

In 1923, the club beat FT Stettin-Bredow (4–0), Tasmania Forst (3–1) and Komet Altona (3–1) on their way to the ATSB national final against defending two-time champion VfL Leipzig-Südost. The first meeting between the two clubs ended in a 1–0 victory for Leipzig that was annulled following a protest by the Berliners over the date and grounds for the mach. Alemania lost the rematch 3–1.

In the 1923/24 season, Alemannia 22 was able to defend the championship title of the Märkische Spielvereinigung, defeating FT Neukölln-Britz 3–1 in the final at the Lichtenberg stadium on 6 April 1924. In the first round of the East German championship the 1st Stettiner RSV Walhalla was eliminated 2:1 in Stettin on 11 May 1924, but in the second round Alemannia 22 was eliminated on 18 May 1924 in Guben against SV Stern Breslau with 0:1. In the 1925/26 season, Alemannia 22 became champion of the Märkische Spielvereinigung again, but did not participate in the East German championship due to excessive travel costs.

In the following years the club could not achieve further successes. In 1928 Alemannia 22 split off with the other clubs of the Märkische Spielvereinigung from the social democrat dominated ATSB. From 1930 to February 1933, the Märkische Spielvereinigung belonged to the KPD-related Kampfgemeinschaft für Rote Sporteinheit ("Red Sport Unity"). In March 1933, BFC Alemannia 22 was forced to dissolve by the new National Socialist regime. There was no successor association after the Second World War.

== Results ==
=== Regional and National Championships ===
ATSB Championship 1922/23
Stage	Opponent	Location	Result
East Germany Semi-Finals	FT Stettin-Bredow	unknown	4-0
East Germany Finals	SC Tasmania 1913 Forst	Spremberg	3-1
Nationwide Semi-Finals	SV Komet 09 Groß-Flottbek	Altona	3-1
Nationwide Finals	VfL Leipzig-Stötteritz	Halle, Berlin	0-1, 1–3*

* Following a protest regarding the original date and choice of site (Halle) for the final, a rematch was held in Berlin.

ATSB Championship 1923/24
Stage	Opponent	Location	Result
East Germany Quarter-Finals	1.Stettiner RSV Walhalla 98	unknown	0-0*, 1–2
East Germany Semi-Finals	SC Stern 1919 Breslau	unknown	0-1

* Game is listed as being interrupted and replayed.

=== End of League Championships ===
Märkische Spielvereinigung 1922/23 — League 1
Stage	Opponent	Location	Result
ATSB Semi-Finals	SV Stralau 1910	unknown	1-2
ATSB Finals	Mariendorfer SC 1913	Adler 12 Platz	3-2

Märkische Spielvereinigung 1923/24 — League 1
Stage	Opponent	Location	Result
ATSB Semi-Finals	SV Stralau 1910	unknown	2:0
ATSB Finals	FT Neukölln-Britz	Lichtenberg	3:1

Märkische Spielvereinigung 1925/26 — League 1
Stage	Opponent	Location	Result
ATSB Semi-Finals	Luckenwalder TS Abt. I	unknown	4-3
ATSB Finals	SV Stralau 1910	Adler 12 Platz	4-2

=== Leagues ===
"Rote Sporteinheit" Märkische Spielvereinigung —League 1, Division A
Season	Games	Goals	Diff.	Points	End Position
1931/32	18	48:34	12	23:13	3rd
1932/33	15	unknown	N/A	13:17	6th
