= SV Stralau 10 =

German football club

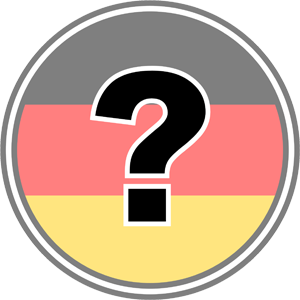
- Full name: Sport-Verein Stralau e.V.
- Founded: 1910
- 2009–10: defunct
Home colours	Away colours

SV Stralau was a German association football club from the district of Stralau in the city of Berlin.

== History ==
The club was established in 1910 and part of the Arbeiter-Turn- und Sportbund (ATSB, en:Worker's Gymnastics and Sports Federation), a leftist national workers' sporting organization that was active from 1893–1933 until banned under the Nazi regime as politically undesirable. The ATSB staged a football competition and championship separate from that of the DFB (Deutscher Fußball Bund, en:German Football Association) from 1920 to 1933. Stralau beat Bremerhaven 93 (2:0) to advance to the 1925 ATSB final versus Dresdener SV 10 where they suffered a 7:0 drubbing.

The club eventually left the ATSB to join the mainstream DFB. In 1943–45, during the late stages of World War II, the team was part of the combined wartime side Kriegspielgemeinschaft Berolina/Stralau Berlin alongside Berolina-Lichtenberger Sportclub 01. Following the conflict, occupying Allied authorities banned most organizations across the country, including sports and football clubs, as part of the process of de-Nazification. The club was re-established in 1945 as Sportgruppe Stralau and played a single season in the short-lived postwar Stadtliga Berlin. It was renamed SC Berolina 1902 Stralau in 1948, before again renamed SG Berolina Stralau sometime in 1949.

On 21 August 1992, the team merged with Sportverein Eintracht Friedrichshain to form Friedrichshainer SV Berolina Stralau 01.
