= Tuspo Fürth =

German football club

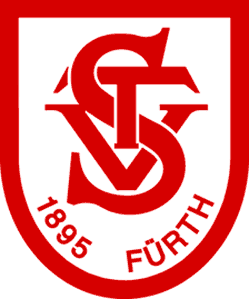
- Logo of Tuspo Fürth
- Full name: Turn- und Sportverein Fürth
- Founded: 1895
- Dissolved: 2003
Home colours	Away colours

Tuspo Fürth was a German association football club from the city of Fürth, Bavaria that was notable as the first champion of the Arbeiter-Turn- und Sportbund (ATSB or Workers' Gymnastics and Sports Federation) which staged its own national football championship, separate from that of the DFB (Deutscher Fußball Bund, en:German Football Association), from 1920 to 1932. The club became part of the tradition of SpVgg Greuther Fürth through a merger on 1 July 2003.

== History ==
The roots of Tuspo lay in the establishment on 12 December 1895 of Arbeiter Turnverein Fürth, which grew steadily over the next two decades. They were joined by TV Jahn Fürth in 1908, before merging with Kraftsportclub Fürth, Fußball Club Merkur Fürth, and FC Pfeil Fürth in 1912 to create Turn- und Sportverein Fürth. Tuspo appeared in the first ATSB final in 1920 and defeated TuS Süden Forst 3:2 to capture the league title. In 1926, the athletics department left to form an independent club called Kraftsportclub Fürth.

In 1933, the Nazis banned workers' and faith-based clubs, including Tuspo, as politically unacceptable. The team was reformed after World War II on 14 November 1948 and remained active as an independent club until the 2003 merger with SpVgg.

== Honours ==
- ATSB champions: 1920

== Stadium ==
From 1919 to 1933, Tuspo played its home fixtures at Kronacher Staße. Following the reestablishment of the club in 1948, they played at Seeacherstraße.
