= José Antonio Tejedor =

Spanish footballer (1943–2025)

Personal information
- Full name: José Antonio Tejedor Sanz
- Date of birth: 2 November 1943
- Place of birth: Pedrajas de San Esteban, Spain
- Date of death: 2 June 2025 (aged 81)
- Place of death: Nava del Rey, Spain
- Height: 1.70 m (5 ft 7 in)
- Position: Forward

Youth career
- Europa Delicias

Senior career*
Years	Team	Apps	(Gls)
1964–1967	Real Valladolid	53	(17)
1967–1970	Real Zaragoza	30	(6)
1970–1973	Deportivo de La Coruña	20	(2)
1973–1974	Real Valladolid	17	(0)
Total		120	(25)

Managerial career
- 1986–1989: Real Ávila
- 1993–1994: Real Ávila
- 1994–1995: Palencia
- * Club domestic league appearances and goals

José Antonio Tejedor Sanz (2 November 1943 – 2 June 2025) was a Spanish professional football player and coach.

== Career ==
Born in Pedrajas de San Esteban, Tejedor played as a forward for Europa Delicias, Real Valladolid, Real Zaragoza, and Deportivo de La Coruña. He retired following injuries.

He later became a coach, and worked with Real Valladolid youth teams. He managed Real Ávila and Palencia. With Real Ávila he won promotion to Segunda División B following the 1986–87 season, the first time the club had reached that level.

== Death ==
Tejedor died on 2 June 2025, at the age of 81.
