= SV Süden Forst =

German football club

- Full name: Sportverein Süden Forst e.V.
- Founded: 1907
- Dissolved: 2011
- Ground: Platz an der Waldstraße
- League: defunct
Home colours	Away colours

SV Süden Forst was a German football club from Forst (Lausitz).

== History ==
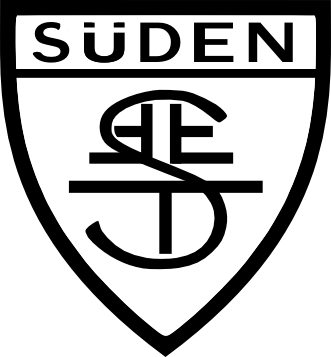
Logo of TuS Süden Forst

The team was established 4 May 1907 as Turn- und Sportverein Süden Forst. They joined the Arbeiter-Turn- und Sportbund (ATSB or Workers' Gymnastics and Sports Federation) in 1919 and made two appearances in the league final after claiming the regional Ostdeutschland title. In 1920, they beat TSV Cassel-Waldau 5–1 in a semi-final match-up before losing to Tuspo Fürth 2–3 in the final. In 1926, they advanced to the final past TSV St. Leonhardt-Schweinau (2–0), where they dropped a 1–5 decision to DSV 1910 Dresden. The club was active until 1933 when worker's sports clubs were banned as politically undesirable under the Third Reich. After 1933, the club merges with VfB 1901 Forst (founded 1901 as FC Hohenzollern Forst) to SpVgg Forst and plays in the second division of Gauliga Berlin-Brandenburg. The club was dissolved 1945.

After World War II, the club was re-established as Sportverein Süden Forst before East German authorities renamed it SG Einheit Forst. Through most of the 1960s and 1970s they were a third-division side, before slipping to fourth-tier play in the 1980s. The club's name reverted to SV after German reunification in 1990 and in 2011 announced a merger with Rot-Weiß 90 Forst to form SV Lausitz Forst. with the new club playing in the Kreisoberliga.

== Honours ==
The club's honours:

- Ostdeutscher ATSB
  - Champions: 1919, 1926
- ATSB
  - Vice-champions: 1919, 1926
