= MSV Normannia 08 =

German football club

- Full name: Märkischer Sportverein Normannia 08 Berlin e.V.
- Nickname: MSV
- Founded: 1908; 117 years ago
- Ground: Stadion Finsterwalder Straße
- Capacity: 4,000
- Chairman: Torben-Marc Meyer
- Manager: Michael Schmalz
- League: Bezirksliga Berlin (VIII)
- 2015–16: Kreisliga Berlin A – Staffel 2 (IX), 2nd (promoted)
| Home colours | Away colours |

MSV Normannia 08 is a German association football club from the city of Berlin. The club was established 1 October 1908 as Berliner Fußball-Club Normannia and adopted its current identity as Märkischer Sportverein Normannia 08 Berlin in 1988.

== History ==
Early in its history, the club flirted with failed partnerships. In 1911, they joined with SV Niederschönhausen for a year. They merged with BFC vom Jahre 1893 in 1918 to play as Sportvereinigung Normannia vom Jahre 1893 in another short-lived partnership lasting just a year. In 1928, they adopted the name Berliner Sportclub Normannia before later becoming Sportverein Normannia. Throughout this period and through to the end of World War II, the team played lower-tier local football.

The club briefly disappeared in the aftermath of the war when occupying Allied authorities banned organizations across the country, including sports and football clubs, a part of the process of denazification. New clubs soon emerged in the latter half of 1945 and the membership of Normannia was re-organized as Sportgruppe Nordost alongside a large part of the former membership of Nordiska Berlin. Normannia was re-founded on 15 April 1950 and resumed its place as a lower-tier local side. The club's greatest success came with their advance to the Amateur Oberliga Berlin (III) for a single season turn in 1971–72.

MSV Normannia 08 most recently played in the ninth tier Kreisliga Berlin A where a runners-up finish in 2015–16 took the club back up to the Bezirksliga.
