= Carriço (footballer) =

Portuguese footballer

Personal information
- Full name: Manuel Luís dos Santos
- Date of birth: 5 February 1943 (age 83)
- Place of birth: Setúbal, Portugal
- Position: Defender

Senior career*
Years	Team	Apps	(Gls)
1965–1975	Vitória Setúbal	269	(4)

International career
1969–1972	Portugal	3	(0)
- * Club domestic league appearances and goals

Manuel Luís dos Santos (born 5 February 1943) aka Carriço, is a former Portuguese footballer who played as a defender.
