= Bogdan Turudija =

Serbian footballer (born 1948)

Personal information
- Date of birth: 30 June 1948 (age 78)
- Place of birth: Loznica, Yugoslavia
- Height: 1.78 m (5 ft 10 in)
- Position: Midfielder

Youth career
- 1960–1966: OFK Beograd

Senior career*
Years	Team	Apps	(Gls)
1966–1976	OFK Beograd	271	(26)
1976–1977	Troyes	24	(4)
1977–1978	Entente BFN	18	(1)
1978	Oakland Stompers	11	(1)
1978	OFK Beograd	8	(1)
1979	Edmonton Drillers	24	(1)
1979–1982	UR Namur	77	(11)
Total		433	(45)
- * Club domestic league appearances and goals

Bogdan Turudija (Serbian Cyrillic: Богдан Турудија; born 30 June 1948) is a former Yugoslav and Serbian footballer who played as a midfielder.

== Career ==
Born in Loznica, Turudija moved to Belgrade with his family as an infant. He started playing at OFK Beograd, making his senior debut in 1966. Over the next decade, Turudija amassed over 250 appearances in the Yugoslav First League. He also played over 20 games with the Romantičari in the UEFA Cup. In late 1976, Turudija went abroad to France and spent one year with Troyes. He then switched to fellow French club Entente BFN during the 1977–78 season.

In 1978, Turudija moved to the United States at the invitation of Milan Mandarić and joined the Oakland Stompers of the North American Soccer League. He rejoined OFK Beograd for two months during the off-season, before returning to the NASL to play for the Edmonton Drillers, newly relocated from Oakland. Between 1979 and 1982, Turudija spent three seasons with Belgian side UR Namur.
