= Pedrajas de San Esteban =

Coordinates: 41°21′N 4°35′W

Pedrajas de San Esteban, Spain
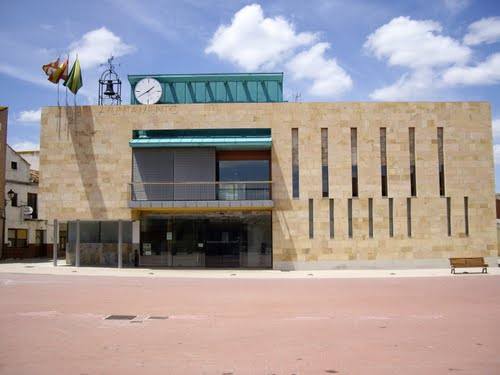
- Facade of their Town hall

- Flag Coat of arms
- Interactive map of Pedrajas de San Esteban, Spain
- Country: Spain
- Autonomous community: Castile and León
- Province: Valladolid
- Municipality: Pedrajas de San Esteban

Area
  - Total: 30 km^{2} (12 sq mi)
- Elevation: 754 m (2,474 ft)

Population (2025-01-01)
  - Total: 3,434
  - Density: 110/km^{2} (300/sq mi)
- Time zone: UTC+1 (CET)
  - Summer (DST): UTC+2 (CEST)

Pedrajas de San Esteban is a municipality located in the province of Valladolid, Castile and León, Spain. According to the 2004 census (INE), the municipality has a population of 3,317 inhabitants.

== Twin towns ==
Pedrajas de San Esteban is twinned with:

- Saint-Nolff, France, since 1991
- Mola di Bari, Italy, since 2012

== See also ==
- Cuisine of the province of Valladolid
