= Prudent Bettens =

Belgian footballer

Personal information
- Date of birth: 4 July 1943
- Place of birth: Waregem, Belgium
- Date of death: 20 September 2010 (aged 67)
- Place of death: Waregem, Belgium
- Position: Striker

Senior career*
Years	Team	Apps	(Gls)
1959–1971	Waregem	295	(115)
1971–1972	Cercle Brugge	31	(3)
1973–1975	VG Oostende		

International career
1967–1968	Belgium	3	(0)

Managerial career
- Roeselare
- 2001: Waregem
- * Club domestic league appearances and goals

Prudent Bettens (4 July 1943 – 20 September 2010) was a Belgian footballer. He played in three matches for the Belgium national football team from 1967 to 1968.
