= Ivan Kopecký =

Czech footballer and manager

Personal information
- Date of birth: 29 January 1946 (age 80)
- Place of birth: Czechoslovakia
- Position: Midfielder

Youth career
- 1959–1962: SK Slavia Prague

Senior career*
Years	Team	Apps	(Gls)
1963–1971	Slavia Prague		
1972–1980	VP Frýdek-Místek		

Managerial career
- 1983–1984: Bohemians Praha (assistant)
- 1985–1988: TJ Vítkovice
- 1988–1989: Slavia Prague
- 1990–1992: Czechoslovak Olympic team
- 1992: FC Baník Ostrava
- 1993–1998: Czech Republic U-21
- 1998–1999: Petra Drnovice
- * Club domestic league appearances and goals

Ivan Kopecký (born 29 January 1946) is a Czech football manager and former player.

As a player, Kopecký played five seasons in the Czechoslovak First League for Slavia Prague and one season for Frýdek-Místek, making a total of 137 league appearances and scoring 4 goals.

As a coach, Kopecký led several Czech football clubs. His biggest success as a coach was with TJ Vítkovice. Kopecký led the club in the 1985/1986 season to the Czechoslovak First League championship. Thanks to this achievement, he was selected by the football association as the Czechoslovak Coach of the Year in 1986.
