= FSV Berolina Stralau =

German football club

Berolina Stralau
- Full name: Friedrichshaner Sportverein Berolina Stralau 01 e.V.
- Founded: 1901
- Ground: Lasker-Sportplatz
- Capacity: 4000
- Manager: Bengt Demant
- League: Landesliga Berlin Staffel 2 (VII)
- 2018–19: Berlin-Liga (VI), 18th ↓
- Website: http://www.berolina-stralau.de
| Home colours | Away colours |

Friedrichshaner SV Berolina Stralau 01 is a German association football club from the city of Berlin. It is the successor to Berolina Berlin which was formed 1 July 1901 as Berliner Fußball-Club Libertas-Südost Berlin.

== Berolina Berlin ==
Libertas played in the Märkische Fußball-Bund, an early Berlin-based league active from 1901 to 1911. They adopted the name Berliner Sport-Club Berolina in 1909 and became part of the Oberliga Berlin (I) in 1913. Generally a lower table side, the club's best results came as a 3rd-place finish in the MFB in 1910 and a 2nd place Oberliga finish in 1918.

The team joined the Berliner Turnerkooperation in 1918 as that club's football department and maintained its identity as Fußballabteilung Berolina der BT. They became independent again sometime in 1923. On 12 May 1926, Berolina merged with Lichtenburger Sportclub 01 to form Berolina-Lichtenburger SC 01. The Lichtenburg side was the product of 22 August 1919 union between Lichtenburger Sport-Club 02 and Lichtenburger Sport-Club Frisch-Auf.

In 1933, German football was reorganized under the Third Reich into 16 top-flight regional divisions. Although Berolina never managed to qualify for play in the Gauliga Berlin-Brandenburg (I), they did advance to the first knock out round of the 1935 Tschammerspokal, predecessor to today's DFB-Pokal with victories over SC Victoria Hamburg and Vorwärts-Rasensport Gleiwitz before being eliminated 1:5 by Berlin FC Hanau 93.

== WWII and postwar play in East Germany ==
Towards the end of World War II, SC became part of the wartime side Kriegspielgemeinde Berolina/Stalau Berlin alongside partner Sportverein Stralau. Following the conflict occupying Allied authorities dissolved most organizations in the country, including football and sports clubs, as part of the process of de-Nazification. Many clubs were soon reestablished and the former membership of Berolina was reorganized as Sportgruppe Stralau. Located in the Soviet-occupied eastern part of the country the team became part of the separate football competition that emerged in East Germany.

In 1948, the team took on the name SC Berolina 02 Stralau before sometime in 1949 becoming SG Berolina Stralau. The club was one of the few East Berlin sides that was able to quickly resume its pre-war identity as it was not regarded by authorities as being too bourgeois. However, these clubs were unable to benefit from the state-supported sponsorship relationships that developed between sports clubs and industry. Most, including Berolina, languished as lower division sides.

== Post unification ==
On 21 August 1992 SG merged with Sportverein Eintracht Friedrichshain to create present day side Friedrichshaner SV Berolina Stralau 01. The team was part of the city district league Bezirksliga Berlin (VII) until winning promotion to the Landesliga in 2014 and eventually, for the first time ever, to the Berlin-Liga (VI) in 2018 after winning its first Landesliga title, only to be relegated after one season.
