= BV Kassel 06 =

German football club

- Full name: Ballspielverein Kassel 06
- Founded: 1906 (as Casseler BV)
- Dissolved: 1945

BV Kassel was a German association football club from the city of Kassel, Hesse. The club was established in 1906 as Ballspielverein Kassel and played as part of the ATSB (Arbeiter-Turn- und Sportbund or Workers' Gymnastics and Sports Federation), a leftist national sports organization which organized a football competition and championship separate from that of the DFB (Deutscher Fußball Bund, en:German Football Association). The club advanced to the ATSB final in 1921-21 through a 3:0 quarterfinal victory over Germania Wilhelmshaven and a 3:1 win over ATSV Rheinau. They were beaten in the final by VfL Leipzig-Südost (4:1).

In 1933, the Nazis, who banned workers' and faith-based clubs as politically unpalatable, and BV became part of mainstream competition in the DFB. The team narrowly missed qualifying for the regional top-flight Gauliga Nordhessen (I) in 1935, but eventually won promotion to the Gauliga Kurhessen (I) in 1941. They struggled through the next two campaigns earning only lower table finishes there. On 22 October 1943, BV became part of the combined wartime side Kriegspielgemeinschaft 06/Sport Kassel in response to manpower shortages. The club abandoned it place in Gauliga play in March 1944 to take part in lower-level competition.

BV was lost in 1945 following the end of World War II. The former membership became part of SG Blau-Weiß Kassel which restored the tradition of BC Sport Kassel in 1947.

== Stadium ==
BV first played in An der Herkulebrauerei before leaving for Tapsgasse.
