= Schild Sports Association =

The Sportbund Schild des Reichsbundes jüdischer Frontsoldaten (en: Sports Association Shield of the Reich Federation of Jewish Frontline Soldiers) was a Jewish sports association established in 1925 as the sports arm of the Reichsbund jüdischer Frontsoldaten (en: Reich Federation of Jewish Frontline Soldiers). The RjF was formed in 1919 as a patriotic association of Jewish war veterans to demonstrate Jewish loyalty to Germany and to challenge rising antisemitism. Throughout its existence the association was led by Dr. Leo Löwenstein, who had served as an army Captain. He was also the founder and chairman of the RjF from its inception until its dissolution.

Initially Schild was narrowly focused on gymnastics and martial arts including Judo and Jiu-Jitsu. After the rise of the Nazis, Jews faced increasing persecution and were driven from mainstream sports clubs and associations. As a result, new departments were formed within Schild after 1932 including athletics, water sports, skiing, fencing, and football. More broadly, new sports clubs emerged as part of the organization.

The activities of the RjF were outlawed by the Nazi regime in 1936, and in late 1938 it was dissolved.

Sportbund Schild Membership
Year	Membership	Clubs
1933	7,000	90
1934	17,000	156
1935	20,000	182
1936	21,000	216

Schild Football Champions
Year	Club
1934	JSG 33 Berlin
1935	TSV Schild Frankfurt
1936	TSV Schild Frankfurt
1937	TSV Schild Stuttgart
1938	TSV Schild Bochum
