= Gerd Kostmann =

German footballer

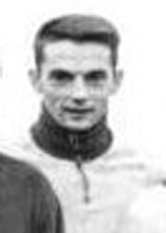
- Kostmann with Hansa Rostock in 1969

Personal information
- Full name: Gerhard Rüdiger Kostmann
- Date of birth: 2 July 1941 (age 85)
- Place of birth: Stettin, Germany
- Height: 1.84 m (6 ft 0 in)
- Position: Striker

Youth career
- Traktor Zodel

Senior career*
Years	Team	Apps	(Gls)
–1964	Motor Wolgast		
1964–1971	Empor/Hansa Rostock	89	(43)
- * Club domestic league appearances and goals

Gerhard "Gerd" Kostmann (born 2 July 1941) is a German former footballer who played as a striker. He is most remembered for being the top scorer for two consecutive seasons in the East German DDR-Oberliga before reunification.

== Personal life ==
He has two sons named Jörg and Marco.

== Notes ==
1. Now Szczecin, Poland.
