= Bjarne =

- Pronunciation: Danish: [ˈpjɑːnə]
- Gender: male

Origin
- Meaning: Bear

Other names
- Related names: Bjorn

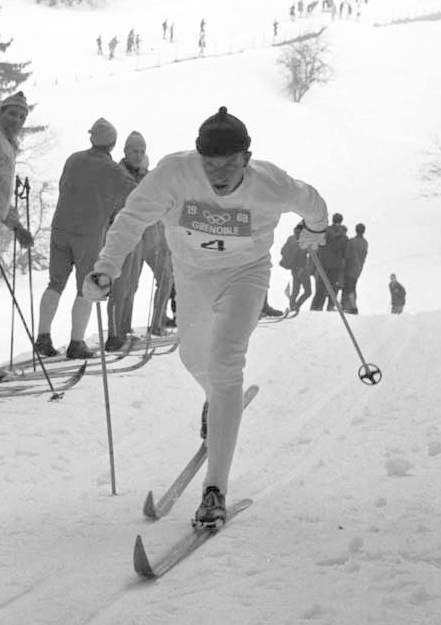
Bjarne Andersson, 1968 Olympics.

Bjarne is a Nordic masculine given name, a variant of Bjørn. Notable peoplee with the name include:

- Bjarne Aas (1886–1969), Norwegian ship builder
- Bjarne Amdahl (1903–1968), Norwegian pianist, composer and orchestra conductor
- Bjarne Andersen, Norwegian actor and theatre director
- Bjarne Andersson, Swedish cross-country skier
- Bjarne Angell, Norwegian tennis player
- Bjarne Ansbøl (born 1937), Danish wrestler
- Bjarne Arentz (1928–2017), Norwegian alpine skier
- Bjarne Keyser Barth (1892–1972), Norwegian Army officer
- Bjarne Bassøe (1892–1975), Norwegian engineer
- Bjarne Berg-Sæther (1919–2009), Norwegian politician
- Bjarne Berg (1950–2010), Norwegian swimmer and journalist
- Bjarne Berntsen (born 1956), Norwegian football manager
- Bjarne Berulfsen (1906–1970), Norwegian philologist and professor
- Bjarne Bø (1907–1998), Norwegian actor
- Bjarne Bogen (born 1951), Norwegian immunologist
- Bjarne Brøndbo (born 1964), Norwegian singer
- Bjarne Brustad (1895–1978), Norwegian musician
- Bjarne Corydon (born 1973), Danish politician
- Bjarne Dahl (1897–1989), American architect
- Bjarne Dalland (1906-1943), Norwegian trade unionist and politician
- Bjarne Døhlen (1904–1989), Norwegian jurist and civil servant
- Bjarne Mørk Eidem (1936–2022), Norwegian politician
- Bjarne Eltang (1960–2023), Danish rower
- Bjarne Eriksen (businessman) (1886–1976), Norwegian businessman
- Bjarne Eriksen (painter) (1882–1970), Norwegian painter
- Bjarne Fiskum (1939–2021), Norwegian musical artist
- Bjarne Fjærtoft (1899–1981), Norwegian politician
- Bjarne Flem (1914–1999), Norwegian politician
- Bjarne Forchhammer (1903–1970), Danish actor
- Bjarne Goldbæk (born 1968), Danish footballer
- Bjarne Gran (1918–1992), Norwegian journalist
- Bjarne Elgar Grottum (1893–1987), American politician
- Bjarne Gulbrandsen (1889-1966), Norwegian footballer
- Bjarne Guldager (1897–1971), Norwegian sprinter
- Bjarne Hansen (art director) (born 1966), Danish art director
- Bjarne Hansen (footballer, born 1894) (1894-1915), Norwegian footballer
- Bjarne Hansen (footballer, born 1929) (1929–2023), Norwegian footballer
- Bjarne Hanssen (1917–2014), Norwegian politician
- Bjarne Håkon Hanssen (born 1962), Norwegian politician
- Bjarne Henning-Jensen (1908–1995), Danish film director
- Bjarne Henriksen (born 1959), Danish actor
- Bjarne Henry Henriksen (1904–1995), Norwegian politician
- Bjarne Hodne (born 1943), Norwegian folklorist
- Bjarne Holen (1925–2021), Norwegian politician
- Bjarne Johannes Hope (1944–2006), Norwegian civil servant
- Bjarne Hoyer (1912–1991), Danish composer
- Bjarne Hurlen (1915–1998), Norwegian military personnel
- Bjarne Kortgaard Ingebretsen (born 1987), Norwegian footballer
- Bjarne Iversen (1912–1999), Norwegian cross-country skier
- Bjarne Jensen (curler) (born 1956), Danish wheelchair curler and Paralympian
- Bjarne Jensen (footballer) (born 1959), Danish footballer
- Bjarne Jensen (umpire) (born 1958), Danish cricket umpire
- Bjarne Jeppesen (1954–2024), Danish handball player
- Bjarne Johnsen (1892–1984), Norwegian gymnast
- Bjarne Johnsen (footballer) (1897–1982), Norwegian footballer
- Bjarne Jørgensen (born 1933), Danish gymnast
- Bjarne Jullum (1894–1973), Norwegian newspaper editor
- Bjarne Kallis (born 1945), Finnish politician
- Bjarne Kjørberg (1916–1969), Norwegian politician
- Bjarne Klavestad (1905-1930), Norwegian footballer
- Bjarne Kristiansen (born 1937), Norwegian politician
- Bjarne Kroepelien (1890–1966), Norwegian wine merchant
- Bjarne Larsen (1904-1972), Norwegian footballer
- Bjarne Laustsen (born 1953), Danish politician
- Bjarne Lerum (1941–2010), Norwegian businessman and politician
- Bjarne Liller (1935–1993), Danish musician and singer-songwriter
- Bjarne Lindstrøm (born 1942), Norwegian diplomat
- Bjarne Lingås (1933–2011), Norwegian boxer
- Bjarne Lyngstad (1901–1971), Norwegian politician
- Bjarne Mädel (born 1968), German actor
- Bjarne Melgaard (born 1967), Norwegian artist based in New York City
- Bjarne Moe (1948–2019), Norwegian economist
- Bjarne Møgelhøj (born 1944), Danish politician
- Bjarne Nerem (1923–1991), Norwegian jazz musician
- Bjarne Ness (1902–1927), Norwegian painter
- Bjarne Nielsen (born 1957), Danish politician
- Bjarne Nissen (1869–1950), Norwegian brewer
- Bjarne Øen (1898–1994), Norwegian Air Force lieutenant general
- Bjarne Olsen (1898-1976), Norwegian footballer
- Bjarne Orten (1919–2011), Norwegian civil servant
- Bjarne Øverhaug (1927–1996), Norwegian journalist and politician
- Bjarne Pedersen (born 1978), Danish speedway rider
- Bjarne Pedersen (rower) (born 1944), Danish rower
- Bjarne Petersen (born 1952), Danish footballer
- Bjarne Pettersen (footballer) (1907-1975), Norwegian footballer
- Bjarne Pettersen (gymnast) (1891–1983), Norwegian gymnast
- Bjarne Pettersson (born 1952), Danish footballer
- Bjarne Pudel (born 2001), German footballer
- Bjarne Redestad (1922–1980), Swedish footballer
- Bjarne Reuter (born 1950), Danish writer and screenwriter
- Bjarne Riis (born 1964), Danish cyclist
- Bjarne Rise (1904–1984), Norwegian painter
- Bjarne M. Robberstad (1912–1977), Norwegian civil servant
- Bjarne Rognlien (1891–1981), Norwegian judge
- Bjarne Rønning (born 1953), Norwegian children's writer
- Bjarne Rosén (1909-1989), Norwegian footballer
- Bjarne Røtterud (1929–2011), Norwegian painter
- Bjarne Røyland (born 1971), Norwegian bobsledder
- Bjarne Saltnes (1934–2016), Norwegian politician
- Bjarne Sandemose (1924–2013), Norwegian cinematographer
- Bjarne Schrøen (1918–1991), Norwegian bobsledder
- Bjarne Skard (1896–1961), Norwegian bishop
- Bjarne Slapgard (1901–1997), Norwegian educator and author
- Bjarne Sognnæs (born 1966), Norwegian footballer
- Bjarne Solbakken (born 1977), Norwegian alpine skier
- Bjarne Solberg (1877–1928), Norwegian physician and politician
- Bjarne Daniel Solli (1910–1989), Norwegian politician
- Bjarne Sørensen (born 1954), Danish cyclist
- Bjarne Store-Jakobsen (born 1944), Norwegian politician
- Bjarne Støtvig (1898–1982), Norwegian politician
- Bjarne Strand (born 1946), Norwegian alpine skier
- Bjarne Aagaard Strøm (1920–2008), Norwegian politician
- Bjarne Stroustrup (born 1950), Danish computer scientist, creator of C++
- Bjarne Thoelke (born 1992), German footballer
- Bjarne Thorsen (1922–2001), Norwegian resistance member
- Bjarne Eilif Thorvik (1908–1972), Norwegian politician
- Bjarne Tromborg (born 1940), Danish physicist
- Bjarne Ugland (born 1946), Norwegian politician
- Bjarne Undheim (1905–1988), Norwegian educator and politician
- Bjarne Karsten Vatne (1926–2009), Norwegian politician
- Bjarne Odd Weider (1913–1985), Norwegian bishop
- Bjarne Wernicke-Olesen, Danish orientalist
- Bjarne Westermarck (1887–1945), Finnish politician
- Bjarne Wnuck (born 2013), German singer

== See also ==
- Bjarni
- Bjorn
