= Bjorn =

Bjorn/Björn/Bjørn/Bjorne
- Pronunciation: English: /biˈɔːrn, bjɜːrn/ bee-ORN, BYURN; Swedish: [ˈbjœːɳ] Icelandic: [ˈpjœ(r)tn̥] German: [bjœʁn] Dutch: [ˈbjʏr(ə)n]
- Gender: male
- Language: Swedish, Danish, Norwegian, Icelandic, Faroese, Dutch, German, Finnish

Origin
- Meaning: Bear
- Region of origin: Germanic

Other names
- Alternative spelling: Bjørn, Bjõrn, Bjorne, Beorn, Bjôrn, Biorn
- Related names: Bjarne, Bjorne, Bjarni, Birni

Bjorn, Bjorne (English, Dutch), Björn (Swedish, Icelandic, Dutch, and German), Bjørn (Danish, Faroese and Norwegian), Beorn (Old English) or, rarely, Bjôrn, Biorn, or Latinized Biornus, Brum (Portuguese), is a Scandinavian male given name, or less often a surname. The name means "bear" (the animal). In Swedish and Finnish, the nickname Nalle ("teddy bear") refers to Björn.

== Given name ==
=== Acting ===
- Björn Andrésen, Swedish actor and musician
- Björn Bjelfvenstam, Swedish actor
- Björn Granath, Swedish actor
- Björn Gustafsson, Swedish comedian and actor
- Björn Gustafson, Swedish actor
- Björn Kjellman, Swedish actor and singer
- Björn Skifs, Swedish singer and actor

=== Art and music ===
- Björn Afzelius, Swedish musician
- Björn Ågren, guitarist for the band Razorlight
- Björn Dixgård, Swedish musician
- Bjørn Eidsvåg, Norwegian musician and Lutheran minister
- Bjorn Englen, Swedish-American bass player of the hard rock band Soul Sign
- Björn Gelotte, guitarist of the Swedish melodic death metal band In Flames
- Björn Hjörtur Guðmundsson, Icelandic craftsman and environmental pioneer
- Björn Holmgren, Swedish singer
- Björn J:son Lindh, Swedish musician
- Bjørn Johansen (musician), Norwegian jazz musician
- Björn Lodin, Swedish musician
- Bjørn Melhus, German artist
- Bjørn Moe, Norwegian conductor
- Bjørn Nilsen, Norwegian musician (performs as Lillebjørn Nilsen)
- Bjørn Simensen, Norwegian culture administrator and journalist
- Björn "Speed" Strid, Swedish vocalist of modern melodic death metal band Soilwork
- Bjorn Surrao, Indian singer-songwriter, music producer and actor
- Bjørn Tagemose, Swedish director and videoartist
- Bjørn Talén, Norwegian opera singer
- Bjorn Thorsrud, American music producer
- Bjørn Tidmand, Danish singer
- Bjørn Torske, Norwegian music producer
- Björn Ulvaeus, Swedish musician and a member of the pop group ABBA
- Bjørn Wiinblad, Danish artist
- Björn Yttling, Swedish musician and music producer

=== Business ===
- Bjørn Rune Gjelsten, Norwegian businessman and powerboat racer
- Björn Jakobson, Swedish businessman, founder of Babybjörn and Artipelag
- Björn Prytz, Swedish industrialist
- Björn Stigson, Swedish business leader
- Björn Wahlroos, Finnish CEO of Sampo Group
- Bjørn Wegge, Norwegian director of information for the Norwegian Humanitarian Enterprise
- Björn Westerlund (1912–2009), Finnish businessman and government minister, CEO of Nokia

=== Historical figures ===
- Björn at Haugi, also called Björn på Håga and Bjorn Eriksson, Swedish king in the 9th century
- Björn (III) Eriksson, king of Sweden in the 9th and 10th centuries
- Beorn Estrithson (died 1049), English nobleman
- Bjørn Farmann, king of Vestfold, petty kingdoms of Norway in the 10th century
- Björn Ironside Haraldsson, the father of Christina Bjornsdatter, 12th-century Swedish queen
- Björn Ironside, legendary Swedish king of the 9th century
- Björn the Eunuch, legendary Swedish king of the 10th century
- Björn Stallare, 11th-century Norwegian diplomat

=== Politics and government ===
- Björn Bjarnason, Icelandic politician
- Herman Bjorn Dahle, politician from Wisconsin, USA
- Bjørn Egge. a major general of the Norwegian Defence Force
- Björn Engholm, German politician
- Björn Eriksson, Swedish civil servant
- Björn von der Esch, Swedish politician
- Bjørn Tore Godal, Norwegian politician
- Björn Leví Gunnarsson, Icelandic politician
- Björn Hamilton, Swedish politician
- Björn Höcke, German politician
- Bjorn Holland, American politician
- Bjørn Jacobsen, Norwegian politician
- Björn Jónsson, former Prime Minister of Iceland
- Ole Bjørn Kraft, Danish journalist and politician
- Björn Leivik, Swedish politician
- Björn Rosengren (politician), Swedish politician
- Björn Schutz, Dutch politician
- Bjørn Skau, Norwegian politician
- Björn Söder, Swedish politician
- Björn von Sydow, Swedish politician
- Björn Þórðarson (Thordarson), former prime minister of Iceland
- Björn Tielebein (born 1983), German politician
- Bjørn Westh, Danish politician
- Björn Wiechel (born 1983), Swedish politician
- Bjørn Erling Ytterhorn, Norwegian politician

=== Science and technology ===
- Björn Engquist, Swedish mathematician
- Björn Envall, Swedish automotive designer
- Björn Ekwall, Swedish toxicologist
- Bjørn Grinde, Norwegian biologist
- Björn Gunnlaugsson, Icelandic mathematician and cartographer
- Biörn Ivemark, Swedish physician
- Björn Kurtén, Finnish-Swedish paleontologist
- Bjørn Lomborg, Danish environmental skeptic and author
- Bjorn Poonen, American mathematician

=== Sports ===
- Bjørn Bang Andersen, Norwegian shot putter
- Björn Andersson (footballer, born 1951), Swedish former player and coach
- Björn Andersson (handballer), Swedish Olympic handballer
- Björn Andrae, German volleyball player
- Björn Bach, German kayaker
- Bjorn Basson, South African rugby player
- Björn Borg, Swedish tennis player
- Björn Borg (swimmer), Swedish swimmer
- Björn Bothén, Swedish sailor
- Bjørn Otto Bragstad, Norwegian soccer player
- Bjorn Bregy, Swiss kickboxer
- Björn Cederberg, Swedish rally driver
- Bjørn Dæhlie, Norwegian skier
- Björn Daelemans, Belgian soccer player
- Bjørn Dahl (footballer born 1954), Norwegian footballer
- Bjørn Dahl (footballer born 1978), Norwegian footballer
- Björn van der Doelen, Dutch footballer
- Björn Dunkerbeck, Dutch windsurfer
- Björn Einarsson, Swedish bandy player
- Björn Emmerling, German field hockey player
- Björn Ferry, Swedish skier
- Björn Vleminckx, Belgian footballer
- Björn Forslund (sailor), Swedish sailor
- Björn Forslund (Speed skater), Swedish speed skater
- Bjorn Fortuin, South African cricketer
- Bjorn Fratangelo, American tennis player
- Bjørn Grimnes, Norwegian athlete
- Bjørn Gundersen, Norwegian athlete
- Björn Hardley, Dutch footballer
- Bjorn Haneveer, Belgian snooker player
- Bjørn Johansen (footballer), Norwegian footballer
- Bjørn Johansen (ice hockey), Norwegian ice hockey player
- Björn Joppien, German badminton player
- Björn Kircheisen, also known as Bjoern Kircheisen, German Olympic athlete
- Björn Knutsson, Swedish motorcycle racer
- Bjorn Kotze, Namibian cricketer
- Bjørn "Benny" Kristensen, Danish soccer player
- Björn Kuipers, Dutch football referee
- Bjørn Tore Kvarme, Norwegian soccer player
- Björn Leukemans, Belgian bicycle racer
- Björn Lilius, Swedish footballer
- Björn Lind, Swedish skier
- Bjørn Arve Lund, Norwegian soccer player
- Björn Maaseide, Norwegian beach volleyball player
- Björn Melin, Swedish ice hockey player
- Bjorn Merten, American football player
- Bjorn Mordt, Zimbabwean cricketer
- Bjørn Myrbakken, Norwegian ski jumper
- Beorn Nijenhuis, Dutch speed skater
- Björn Nittmo, Swedish American Football kicker
- Björn Nordqvist, Swedish soccer player
- Björn Otto, German pole vaulter
- Bjørn Paulson, Norwegian high jumper
- Björn Phau, German tennis player
- Bjørn Helge Riise, Norwegian soccer player
- Bjørn Einar Romøren, Norwegian ski jumper
- Björn Runström, Swedish soccer player
- Björn Schlicke, German soccer player
- Björn Schröder, German cyclist
- Björn Sengier, Belgian soccer player
- Björn Siegemund, German badminton player
- Bjørn Skaare, Norwegian ice hockey player
- Bjørn Skjærpe, Norwegian gymnast
- Bjørn Sundquist, German Olympic athlete
- Björn Svensson, Swedish hockey player
- Bjorn Thorfinnsson, Icelandic chess player
- Björn Thurau, German cyclist
- Bjørn Tronstad, Norwegian soccer player
- Björn Waldegård, Swedish rally driver
- Björn Wirdheim, Swedish racing driver
- Bjørn Wirkola, Norwegian ski jumper
- Björn Zikarsky, German swimmer

=== Writers ===
- Bjørn Benkow, Norwegian journalist exposed as a plagiarist
- Björn Th. Björnsson, Icelandic writer
- Bjørn Hansen, Norwegian journalist
- Björn Hellberg, Swedish sports journalist and author
- Björn Kumm, Swedish journalist
- Björn Nyberg, Swedish fantasy author
- Björn Ranelid, Swedish author
- Bjørn Erik Thon, Norwegian jurist and writer
- Bjørnstjerne Bjørnson, Norwegian writer

=== Other people with the given name ===
- Axlar-Björn, Icelandic serial killer
- Björn Engwall, Swedish officer
- Björn Frantzén, Swedish chef and former footballer
- Bjørn Nyland (Automotive YouTuber), Thai-born Norwegian video blogger
- Claus Bjørn Larsen, Danish photographer

== Surname ==
- Acton Bjørn (1910–1992), Danish architect and designer
- Andreas Bjørn (1703–1750), Danish merchant, shipbuilder and ship owner
- Anna Bjorn (born 1955), Icelandic graphic designer, filmmaker, model, and actress
- Claus Bjørn (1944–2005), Danish historian
- Dinna Bjørn (born 1947), Danish ballet dancer and choreographer
- Evert Björn (1888–1974), Swedish athlete
- Håkan Björne (born 1964), Swedish volleyball player
- Hugo Björne (1886–1966), Swedish actor
- Jørgen Bjørn, Governor of Tranquebar from 1702 to 1704
- Kai Bjorn (born 1968), Canadian sailor
- Kristen Bjorn (born 1957), British pornographic film director and actor
- Kristian Bjørn (1919–1993), Norwegian cross-country skier
- Lasse Björn (1931–2024), Swedish ice hockey player
- Marie Christine Björn (1763–1837), Danish ballet dancer
- Mikkel Bjørn (born 1995), Danish politician
- Nathalie Björn (born 1997), Swedish footballer
- Peter Bjorn (born 1939), Canadian sailor
- Svarta Bjorn (1878–1901), Norwegian railroad cook
- Rolf Ketil Bjørn (1938–2008), Norwegian businessperson and politician
- Thomas Bjørn (born 1971), Danish professional golfer
- Torgeir Bjørn (born 1964), Norwegian cross-country skier
- Tyler Bjorn (born 1970), Canadian yacht racer
- Ulrika Björn (born 1973), Swedish footballer

== See also ==
- Beorn, a character in The Hobbit
- Bjarne
- Björk (name)
- Urs, name also meaning bear
- Deutschland, a Norwegian ship with the same name
