= Bjorn (disambiguation) =

Bjorn and Bjorne is a surname and a given name.

Bjorn and Bjorne may also refer to:

== Places ==
- Björn (Kalix), a Swedish island and nature reserve in the Bay of Bothnia
- Bjørn, Dønna, a village in Dønna municipality in Nordland county, Norway
- Bjorne Formation – Geologic formation in Canada
- Bjorne Islands, Scoresby Sound, Greenland
- {{|anl|Bjorne Island}}
- Bjorne Peninsula, Ellesmere Island, Nunavut, Canada
- Björns trädgård, a public park in Stockholm, Sweden

== People with the mononym ==
- Bjørn (floruit 856–58), Viking chieftain
- Björn (Swedish king 829)
- Björn the Eunuch (10th-century), Swedish king

== Other uses ==
- Deutschland (1905), a 1905 whaling and sealing ship known as Bjorn between 1905 and 1909
- HSwMS Björn, an 1874 Hildur-class monitor of the Swedish navy

== See also ==
- Beorn, a character in The Hobbit
- Bjarne, a given name
- Björk (disambiguation)
