= Bjarni =

- Gender: male
- Language: Icelandic

Origin
- Origin: Old Norse
- Meaning: bear
- Region of origin: Iceland

Other names
- Related names: Bjarne, Björn

Bjarni [ˈpja(r)tnɪ] is an Icelandic male given name. Notable people with the name include:

- Boris Bjarni Akbashev (1933–2023), Soviet-born Icelandic handball player and coach
- Bjarni Ármannsson (born 1968), Icelandic banker
- Bjarni Benediktsson (born 1908), Prime Minister of Iceland from 1963 to 1970
- Bjarni Benediktsson (born 1970), Prime Minister of Iceland in 2017 and 2024
- Bjarni Bjarnason (author) (born 1965), Icelandic writer
- Bjarni Bjarnason (murderer) (1761–1805), Icelandic murderer
- Bjarni Duffield (born 1995), Icelandic footballer
- Bjarni Ólafur Eiríksson (born 1982), Icelandic footballer
- Bjarni Felixson (1936–2023), Icelandic footballer
- Bjarni Friðriksson (born 1956), Icelandic judoka
- Bjarni Fritzson (born 1980), Icelandic handball player
- Bjarni Gissurarson (1621–1712), Icelandic churchman and poet
- Bjarni Guðjónsson (born 1979), Icelandic footballer
- Bjarni Guðmundsson (born 1957), Icelandic handball player
- Bjarni Guðnason (1928–2023), Icelandic footballer
- Bjarni Halldórsson (1703–1773), Icelandic legal figure and theologian
- Bjarni Harðarson (born 1961), Icelandic politician
- Bjarni Herjólfsson, Icelandic explorer who saw North America in 986
- Bjarni Johansen (born 1971), Faroese politician and former footballer
- Bjarni Jónsson (1920–2016), Icelandic mathematician
- Bjarni Jónsson (artist) (1934–2008), Icelandic painter
- Bjarni Jónsson (footballer) (born 1965), Icelandic footballer
- Bjarni Lárusson (born 1976), Icelandic footballer
- Bjarni Már Magnússon (born 1979), Icelandic basketball player
- Bjarni Pálsson (1719–1779), Icelandic doctor
- Bjarni K. Petersen (born 1994), Faroese politician
- Bjarni Sigurðsson (born 1960), Icelandic footballer
- Bjarni Sívertsen (1763–1833), Icelandic merchant
- Bjarni Stefánsson (born 1950), Icelandic sprinter
- Bjarni Sveinbjörnsson (born 1963), Icelandic footballer
- Bjarni Gunnar Sveinsson (born 1946), Icelandic basketball player
- Bjarni Thorarensen (1786–1841), Icelandic poet and official
- Bjarni Tryggvason (1945–2022), Icelandic-Canadian astronaut
- Bjarni Viðarsson (born 1988), Icelandic footballer
- Bjarni Haukur Þórsson (born 1971), Icelandic author, director, producer and actor
- Bjarni Þorsteinsson (1861–1938), Icelandic priest and musician
- Bjarni Óskar Þorsteinsson (born 1976), Icelandic footballer
- Kalli Bjarni (born 1976), Icelandic singer

== See also ==
- Bjarne
- Björn
