= Berulfsen =

Berulfsen is a surname. Notable people with the surname include:

- Bjarne Berulfsen (1906–1970), Norwegian philologist and professor
- Torkjell Berulfsen (1943–2024), Norwegian television personality
