= Bjarne Hansen =

Bjarne Hansen can refer to:

- Bjarne Hansen (art director), Danish art director
- Bjarne Hansen (footballer, born 1894) (1894–1915), Norwegian footballer
- Bjarne Hansen (footballer, born 1929) (1929–2023), Norwegian footballer

== See also ==
- Hansen (disambiguation)
- Hansen (surname)
