= Westermarck =

Westermarck is a surname. Notable people with the surname include:

- Bjarne Westermarck (1887–1945), Finnish politician
- Edvard Westermarck (1862–1939), Finnish philosopher and sociologist
- Helena Westermarck (1857–1938), Swedish-speaking Finnish artist and writer
- Nils Westermarck (1910–2002), Finnish economist and politician
