= Rognlien =

Rognlien is a surname. Notable people with the surname include:

- Bjarne Rognlien (1891–?), Norwegian judge
- Børre Rognlien (born 1944), Norwegian sports official and politician
- Helge Rognlien (1920–2001), Norwegian politician
