= Bjørn Nyland =

Bjørn Nyland may refer to:

- Bjørn Nyland (speed skater) (born 1962), Norwegian speed skater
- Bjørn Nyland (YouTuber) (born 1979 in Thailand), Norwegian YouTuber a.k.a. TeslaBjørn
