= Sustainia =

- Formation: 2007
- Type: Global Climate Collaboration
- Legal status: Foundation
- Headquarters: Copenhagen, Denmark
- Region served: Worldwide
- Chairman: Erik Rasmussen
- Website: sustainiaworld.com
- Formerly called: Copenhagen Climate Council

Sustainia, formerly the Copenhagen Climate Council, is a global collaboration between international business and science based in Copenhagen. It was founded in 2007 and is currently directed by Rasmus Schjødt Larsen.

== History ==
The Copenhagen Climate Council was founded in 2007 by an independent think tank in Scandinavia, Monday Morning, evolving into sustainability think tank Sustainia headquartered in Copenhagen, Denmark. The Council was initially formed to create global awareness of the importance of the Copenhagen climate summit, and to ensure technical and public support and assistance to global decision makers when agreeing on a new climate treaty to replace the Kyoto Protocol from 1997.

The council's manifesto was published in November 2007, on the eve of the 2007 United Nations Climate Change Conference. The document outlined what the council believes is required to tackle climate change and how this can be achieved through a new global treaty. The Manifesto articulates a clear goal for the maximum level of greenhouse gases in the atmosphere by 2050. The document will serve as input at the World Business Summit on Climate Change, outlining key elements for further discussion and inclusion in the recommendations to be delivered to the UN Summit.

== Activities and projects ==
The Copenhagen Climate Council provides a Web 2.0 climate website, The Climate Community, which has since evolved into the Global Opportunity Explorer. The website is funded by UNGC, DNVGL and Sustainia. It publishes climate news as well as the rest of the Copenhagen Climate Council activities, such as the 'World Business Summit on Climate Change'. It has also launched several projects, including: the 'Thought Leadership Series'; the 'Climate LIFE' film, book, and digital exhibition; the scientific conference 'Unlocking the Climate Code: Innovation in Climate and Energy'; and the Poznań side event 'Business Requirements of a Post-2012 Climate Treaty'. The organization has also hosted a Business Roundtable in Beijing.

The World Business Summit on Climate Change took place six months prior to the 2009 Copenhagen climate summit. The summit brought together business chief executives with the world's top scientists, economists, civil society, media leaders, government representatives and other leading thinkers to put forward recommendations for the next international framework on climate change to replace the Kyoto Protocol after 2012. Among the prominent participants were Al Gore, Anders Fogh Rasmussen, and Richard Branson. At the summit, chief executives discussed how business could help solve the climate crisis through innovative business models, new partnerships and the development of low carbon technologies. The results of the World Business Summit on Climate Change were presented to the Danish government, host of the Copenhagen climate summit, and to world leaders negotiating the terms of the next international climate treaty.

On June 19, 2008, Copenhagen Climate Council and Center for Information Technology Research in the Interest of Society (CITRIS) co-hosted an energy conference named Unlocking the Climate Code: Innovation in Climate and Energy. The aim of the conference was to identify the critical research and development achievements necessary for a successful transition to a low-carbon economy. In an effort to create models of the relationships in business, policy, and technology to help guide innovative and rational decision making at the 2009 UN Summit, a suite of tools was developed, better known as the Climate Navigator.

On December 8, 2008, the Copenhagen Climate Council hosted an official side event at the COP14 Summit on Climate Change in Poznań, Poland from December 1–10, 2008. The theme was "Business Requirements to a Post-2012 Climate Treaty". At the event, Council representatives from business and science presented their key principles for a new treaty. The thoughts presented at the event feed into the development of the final recommendations delivered by international business leaders at the World Business Summit on Climate Change, held in Copenhagen in May, 2009.

On November 11, 2008, the Copenhagen Climate Council hosted a roundtable meeting with some of the most prominent business leaders in China and the Danish Minister for Climate and Energy Connie Hedegaard.

== Organization ==
Copenhagen Climate Council comprises 30 global climate leaders representing business, science, and public policy from all parts of the world.

- Business leaders are selected to represent global companies and innovative entrepreneurs, who, through their actions, reveal that sustainable, climate-responsible business is both necessary and profitable.
- Scientists are gathered to ensure that the work of the council is underpinned by rigorous analysis.
- Policy makers with experience in public policy are included in the council to ensure that the work is informed by knowledge of what is required to assist high-level, complex policy negotiations.

The Councilors to the Copenhagen Climate Council are:

- Tim Flannery
- Erik Rasmussen
- Steven Chu
- Shai Agassi
- Carsten Bjerg, fmr. CEO, Grundfos
- David Blood, Generation Investment Management
- Richard Branson
- James Cameron
- Subhash Chandra
- Jørgen Mads Clausen
- Samuel A. DiPiazza Jr
- Anders Eldrup
- Ditlev Engel, former CEO of Vestas
- Yoichi Funabashi, editor-in-chief of The Asahi Shimbun
- Michael Jay, Baron Jay of Ewelme
- Sir David King
- Lise Kingo
- Thomas E. Lovejoy
- James Lovelock
- Rob Morrison, chairman of CLSA Asia-Pacific Markets
- Paul S. Otellini
- Robert Purves, AM chair of Environment Business Australia and board member WWW International
- James E. Rogers Jr.
- Shi Zhengrong
- Björn Stigson
- Crispin Tickell
- Moses Tsang, CEO of Ajia Partners
- Jens Ulltveit-Moe
- Li Xiaolin
