= Björk (name) =

Björk, Björck, Biörck, or Bjork is a Swedish surname meaning birch. It is also an Icelandic name given to girls, meaning birch, specifically the most common native tree of Iceland, Betula pubescens tortuosa (Arctic downy birch).

Notable people with the name include

Given name

- Björk Guðmundsdóttir (born 1965), Icelandic singer
- Hera Björk Þórhallsdóttir (born 1972), Icelandic singer

Surname

- Alexander Björk (born 1990), Swedish professional golfer
- Anders Björck (born 1944), Swedish politician
- Anita Björk (1923–2012), Swedish actress
- Arne Björk (1911–1996), Swedish dentist
- Brant Bjork (born 1973), American musician
- Carl-Johan Björk (born 1982), Swedish-born American football player
- Cheng Yuk Han Bjork (born 1980), Chinese fencer
- Fabian Biörck (1893–1977), Swedish gymnast
- Fredrik Björck (born 1979), Swedish footballer
- Gottfrid Björck (1893–1981), Swedish Army major general
- Hildegard Björck (1847–1920), the first Swedish woman to complete an academic degree
- Jakob Björck (1727/28–1793), Swedish portrait painter
- Johan Björk (born 1984), Swedish ice hockey player
- Nils Björk (1898–1989), Swedish Army lieutenant general
- Nina Björk (born 1967), Swedish feminist author
- Oscar Björck (1860–1929), Swedish painter
- Patrik Björck (born 1957), Swedish politician
- Peder Björk (born 1975), Swedish politician
- Philip R. Bjork, American geologist
- Robert A. Bjork (born 1939), American psychologist
- Svante Björck, Swedish geologist
- Thed Björk (born 1980), Swedish racing driver
- Therese Björk (born 1981), Swedish footballer
- Viking Björk (1918–2009), Swedish cardiac surgeon

== See also ==
- Björk (disambiguation)
- Bjørk, Norwegian equivalent
- Birk, Estonian given name and surname
- Bajorek, Polish surname
