= Bjarne Pettersen =

Bjarne Pettersen can refer to:

- Bjarne Pettersen (footballer)
- Bjarne Pettersen (gymnast)
