= Sara Lindén =

Swedish footballer

Personal information
- Full name: Sara Viktoria Lindén
- Date of birth: 1 September 1983 (age 43)
- Place of birth: Borås, Sweden
- Height: 1.63 m (5 ft 4 in)
- Positions: Midfielder; striker

Senior career*
| Years | Team | Apps | (Gls) |
- Dalsjöfors GoIF
| 2005–2016 | Göteborg FC | 133 | (77) |
| 2016–2022 | Bergdalens IK | | |

International career
| 2008–2010 | Sweden | 15 | (3) |
- * Club domestic league appearances and goals

Sara Viktoria Lindén (born 1 September 1983) is a Swedish former footballer who played for Dalsjöfors GoIF, Göteborg FC, Bergdalens IK, and the Swedish national team.

Outside of football, she has been employed by ICA Banken in her hometown of Borås.

== Club career ==
=== Göteborg FC ===
Between 2005 and 2016, Lindén played for Göteborg FC (now operating as BK Häcken FF) in the Damallsvenskan. During her time at the club, Lindén suffered an anterior cruciate ligament injury.

=== Bergdalens IK ===
For six seasons Lindén played for Bergdalens IK in Elitettan, the second tier of women's football in Sweden.

In December 2022, Bergdalen announced that they would withdraw from Eliettan for the upcoming 2023 season. Lindén played in the team's final match in the league, a 2–3 loss against Uppsala.

== International career ==
In September 2008, Lindén was called up to the senior Swedish national team for a pair of Euro 2009 qualifying matches. She replaced Göteborg teammate Johanna Almgren who was injured. Her first cap came in a 2–0 win over Romania.

Lindén was in the squad for the UEFA Women's Euro 2009 tournament. Sweden topped their group and made it to the quarter-final stage, where they lost to Norway.
