= Darwinian Happiness =

2002 book by Bjørn Grinde

Darwinian Happiness: Evolution As a Guide for Living and Understanding Human Behavior, ISBN 0-87850-159-2, is a 2002 book by the Norwegian biologist Bjørn Grinde from the Norwegian Institute of Public Health. He argues that human emotions find their cause in evolution, and offers ways by which we can use this to our advantage.

More specifically, mammals are equipped with a nerve system that enables them to distinguish not only between pleasant and unpleasant sensations, but positive and negative experiences in general. While the biological term fitness refers to the capacity to create offspring, happiness (or quality of life) is, at least in a biological perspective, a question of the qualities of the experiences our nervous system offers us.

In order to improve these experiences there are two main principles to consider:

1. To utilize the rewarding sensations the brain has evolved to offer in a way that gives optimal long-term benefits; and, similarly, to avoid punishing sensations.
2. To avoid stress and maladaptive ways of living in order to have a healthy mind with optimal potential for positive experiences.

As to the first principle, humans may actually have been equipped with more powerful positive and negative sensations, compared to other mammals, due to our capacity for free will. That is, evolution might tend to add stronger incentives for behavior benefiting the genes in an individual with a powerful free will; as otherwise, the free will could easily result in maladaptive behavior.

As to the second principle, it may be added that, as a rule of thumb, we ought to adapt our way of living to how we are designed by evolution to live. Current ideas in evolutionary medicine and evolutionary psychology suggest that mismatches between the environment of evolutionary adaptation and the present way of living may cause somatic and mental health problems. Such adverse mismatches, referred to as discords, are obviously detrimental to quality of life. For example, unlike Europeans, Indigenous Australians have not had many generations exposed to alcohol, and so are prone to alcohol abuse and the social deprivation it causes.

Grinde argues that "Chemical stimulants do not appear to be a good long-term strategy for contentment."

== See also ==
- Is–ought problem
- Naturalistic fallacy
