= Bajorek =

Bajorek is a Polish surname, from nickname bajor, "talkative person, esp. telling tall tales". Archaic feminine forms: Bajorkowa (by husband), Bajorkówna (by father). Notable people with the surname include:

- Christopher H. Bajorek (born 1943), American engineer
- Bartosz Bajorek
- Franciszek Bajorek (1908–1987), Polish activist, lawyer, and politician
- Joan Palmiter Bajorek (fl. 2018), American businesswoman and linguist
- Anna Streżyńska (born Anna Maria Bajorek; 1967), Polish lawyer and politician
