= Stefán Ólafsson =

Icelandic churchman (c. 1618–1688)

Stefán Ólafsson of Vallanes (c. 1618–1688) was an Icelandic churchman and poet.

== Life ==
Stefán was one of the fifteen children of Ólafur Einarsson (1573–1651), and nephew to Oddur Einarsson, bishop of Skáltholt, the priest of the east-Icelandic settlement of Kirkjubær.

Stefán's father Ólafur had studied theology at the University of Copenhagen from 1594 to 1598. In that year Ólafur began teaching at the Latin School in Skálholt, becoming rector in 1600. He married Kristín Stefánsdóttir, granddaughter of Gísli Jónsson, Bishop of Skálholt, in 1605. Ólafur ceased teaching at the school in 1608.

Ólafur's son Stefán Ólafsson studied at Copenhagen from 1643 to 1648, and worked as an assistant to Ole Worm. He became minister at Vallanes in 1649. In 1651, he married Guðrún Þorvaldsdóttir (ca. 1625–1700) and the two had eight children. Stefán's scholarship included pioneering translations into Latin of the Prose Edda, the poem Völuspá, and the hymns of Thomas Kingo. He composed poetry in Icelandic that ranged across religious and secular themes and is particularly noted for his Grýlukvæði, about the folkloric figure Grýla. His poetry also included Latin epistolary verse exchanged with his younger cousin Bjarni Gissurarson.

Margrét Eggertsdóttir has interpreted Stefán as "a well-educated poet who delighted in experimentation and whose work is strongly influenced by contemporary currents originating in the European mainland".

Stefán Ólafsson's children included Ólafur Stefánsson (1658–1741), who himself became priest at Vallanes.

== Legacy ==
A monument to Stefán by Ríkharður Jónsson (1888–1977), unveiled 15 August 1971, stands at Vallanes.
