= Juliusz Słowacki Polish Gymnasium =

School in the Czech Republic

Coordinates: 49.7440°N 18.6261°E

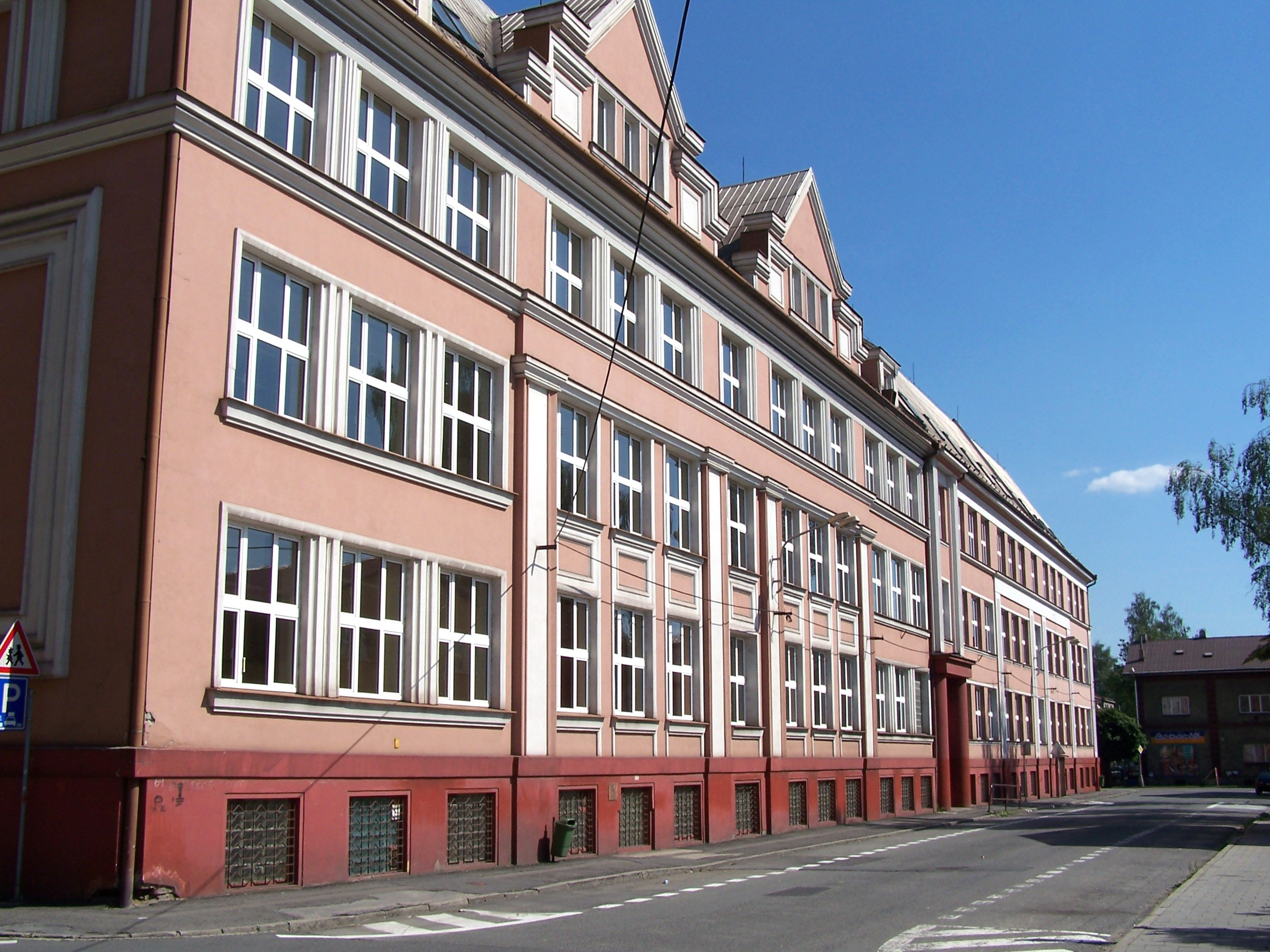
The building of the school

Juliusz Słowacki Polish Gymnasium (Czech: Polské gymnázium Juliusze Słowackého, Polish: Polskie Gimnazjum im. Juliusza Słowackiego) is a Polish gymnasium in Český Těšín in the Moravian-Silesian Region of the Czech Republic. It is the only Polish secondary school in the country, serving the educational purposes of the Polish minority in the Czech Republic in the Trans-Olza region.

The school was founded in 1909 in the town of Orlová (Orłowa) as the second (and up to 1938 the only) Polish secondary school on the territory of Trans-Olza.

== Reasons for founding ==
Cieszyn Silesia changed from an agricultural to an industrial area on the turn of the 19th century. This happened on account of rapid development and expansion of the Ostrava-Karviná Coal Basin. A great number of workers and professionals arrived to a rather small territory. They were of Polish, Czech and German origin, with a majority of the Polish, who formed 60.6% of the population. The coal mining region thus became a typical multilingual society. Polish intelligentsia soon started to express the need of founding a secondary school, which would prepare future Polish speaking mining and metallurgical engineers.

== History ==
=== 1909–1920 ===
On 8 December 1908 the meeting of "Macierz Szkolna" (Polish educational society) made a decision to establish a private secondary school, expecting it would become government-funded in the near future.

On 7 September 1909 the decree of the new school opening was issued by Austrian Ministry of Education and Religion in Vienna. The inauguration took place on 23 September 1909. The school accepted the name of Juliusz Słowacki, a great Polish romantic poet, whose 100th birth anniversary fell in that particular year. The school has been successful and popular among students since the beginning and undoubtedly reached a very high level of education soon.

During the World War I the school was closed for about 2 months due to teachers´ draft. By November 1914 only two teachers were available for work. A lot of students enlisted in newly formed Polish armed forces voluntarily. There appeared some casualties, too, in the front lines in Italy or Russia. The first graduating exams took place in July 1917.

=== 1920–1939 ===
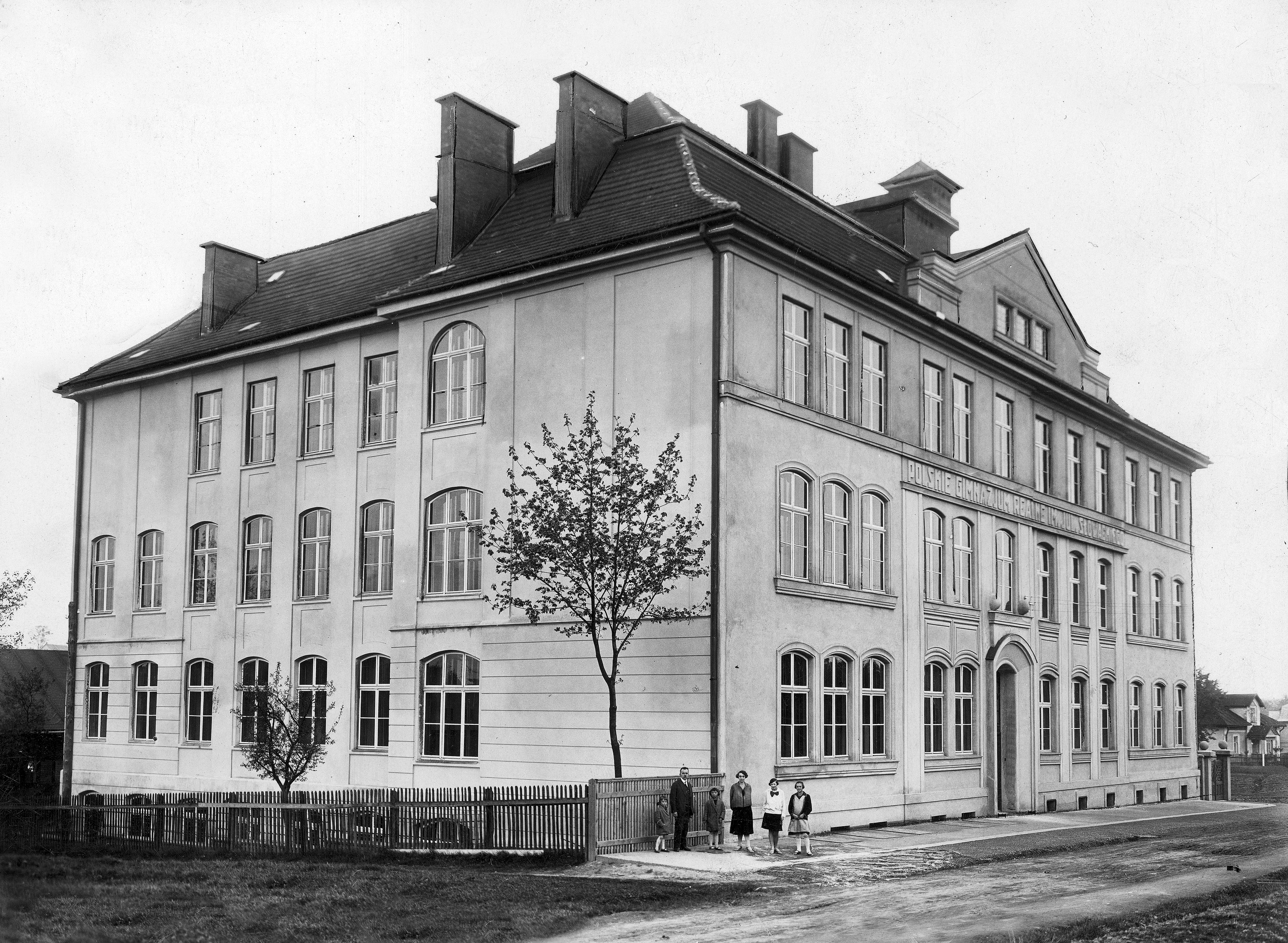
Juliusz Słowacki Polish Gymnasium in the 1920s

The period after World War I seemed to be very turbulent. The independent Czechoslovak Republic was proclaimed on 28 October 1918; the Polish Republic on November 11. Silesia, mainly Cieszyn Silesia, became the eye of conflict between the two.

On 15 May 1920 Polish gymnasium was closed for the second time owing to the ethnic riots in Orlová.

The final partition of Cieszyn Silesia happened on 28 July 1920. Orlová together with the school remained on the Czechoslovak territory. On 17 September 1920 the school was reopened as a private eight-year secondary school with Polish as the first language.

At the eve of the beginning of the World War II other important events took place. Czechoslovakia was forced to give Cieszyn Silesia to Poland on 1 October 1938. Juliusz Słowacki Polish Gymnasium continued its educational work, with mixed Czechoslovak-Polish curriculum.

=== 1939–1945 ===
However, the period of peaceful existence did not last long. On 1 September 1939 the World War II began. All Silesian Polish schools were closed immediately. The staff dispersed – a part remained in Orlová, the rest, being afraid of possible Nazi repressive measures, left the region. The predictions of the oppressive Nazi Germany regime proved true. Most of the teachers were soon arrested and taken away to numerous concentration camps, including school principal Piotr Feliks. The pupils had to give up their secondary studies, the children up to the age of 14 were made to attend German schools, the older ones worked in mines and factories, some were sent to forced labour to Germany.

The school building was used as a German miners´ school, then as a teachers´ school and finally a military hospital as well as army barracks at the very end of World War II.

=== 1945–1964 ===
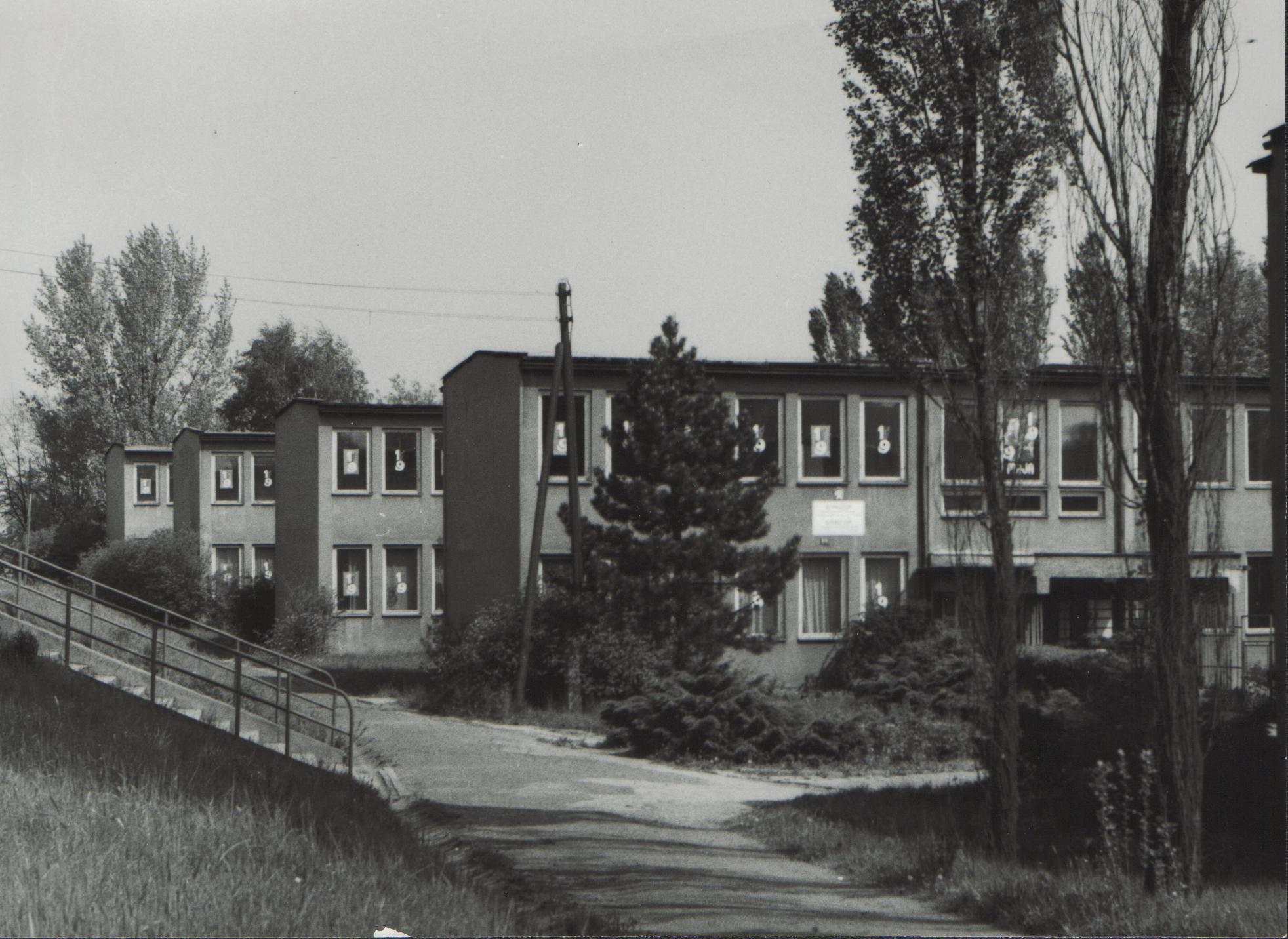
Former Polish Gymnasium in Orlová-Lazy

Orlová was freed by the Soviet Red Army on 1–2 May 1945 and (because the borders were returned to their 1920 state) it belonged to Czechoslovakia again. The whole Polish population expected restarting of educational process in a short time. So already in May 1945 the School Committee was established. It immediately began to negotiate the reopening of all Polish schools. In the meantime the staff and the students together with their parents started to reconstruct the building of the school. After the testing registration of future number of pupils (when 350 of them signed up) the Czechoslovak Ministry of Education issued the permit for the opening of Juliusz Słowacki Polish Gymnasium in Orlová on 18 September 1945.

However, a few limitations appeared – only Czechoslovak citizens were allowed to be students or teachers, „irreproachable with respect to nationality and political matters.“ On 1 October 1945 the inauguration of the beginning of the school year took place in the school hall after masses in both Catholic and Protestant churches. During the ceremony the attendees commemorated the victims of World War II.

In February 1948, after a bloodless coup, the Communist Party of Czechoslovakia took over the power in the state. On 24 February the school joined a one-hour strike, organized by Communist Trade Unions Organisation. On 27 February during the first lesson class teachers discussed the changes of the political situation in the state with the pupils. Since then (till 1989) the communist ideology was present in both curriculum and everyday life of the school.

In April 1948 a meeting took place where the principal instructed all the students „in a great importance of a new school system in Czechoslovakia“. According to this reform secondary schools were changed to 4-year-schools, but only in 1953, after another transformation, there appeared so-called „11-year high school“ and in 1960 „general high school“ that lasted for 3 years.

Shortly before the 50th anniversary the school building underwent general repair of central heating and sewerage. Also a new gymnasium building was erected in the autumn of the 1960. At the beginning of the 1960s the Ministry of Education ordered secondary schools to join into greater units. According to this resolution gymnasium would unite with a Czech school. This decision was opposed by the county inspector of schools. So, eventually, in 1962 a decision was taken that Juliusz Słowacki Polish Gymnasium would be joined with a 9-year primary school in the nearby village of Lazy. The seat of both schools was established in a new primary school Lazy building. The original gymnasium building was deserted. There was ("temporarily", as its statics was endangered by extensive mining damage in the vicinity) a school for children with special needs and a music-school. The old building was pulled down in 1988.

=== 1964–1992 ===
During the 1960s transport links in the area changed significantly so this way Orlová left its importance as a point of junction. Fewer pupils wanted to study in Lazy school. So in 1964 the school was joined with a larger Polish Gymnasium in Český Těšín. Since 1 September 1969 the school has been working as a 4-year gymnasium again. Its main purpose is to educate future students of Czech and Polish universities. However, because the mining damage in the surrounding area (there is Antonín Zápotocký (now Lazy) Mine close to the former school building) gradually developed, a decision was made that school would move to the district city of Karviná.

=== Since 1993 ===
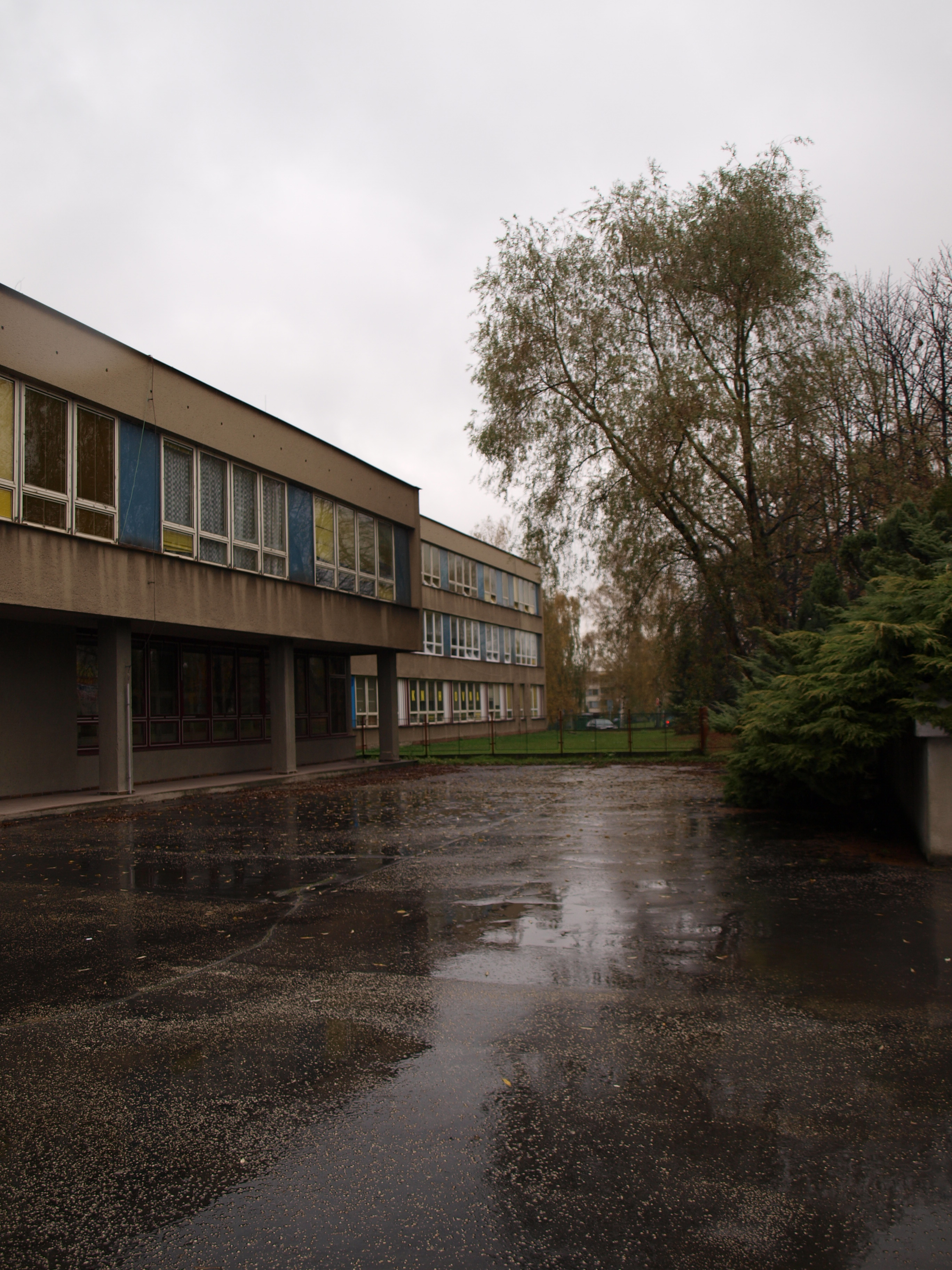
Former Polish Gymnasium in Karviná

By the end of 1992 the Polish Gymnasium was transferred to the former primary school building in Karviná. There is a private Business and Banking Secondary School as well on the premises. In 1997 school joined the Juliusz Słowacki Schools Association in the Polish city of Chorzów. It takes part in annual meetings held in associated schools in Poland and Ukraine. The 15th meeting was organised in school from 30 April to 2 May 1998 hosting 12 schools named after Juliusz Słowacki.

On 6 June 2009 the 100th anniversary of the school was celebrated in the Centre of Culture in Orlová-Lutyně. Monument commemorating the school was unveiled at Orlová-Obroky.

In 2009 the Polish Gymnasium in Karviná has been closed, and the students were transferred to Polish Gymnasium in Český Těšín. The gymnasium in Český Těšín continues the tradition of the original school in Orlová, adopting the official name of Juliusz Słowacki Polish Gymnasium as of 1 September 2014.

== Subjects ==
- Languages: Polish, Czech, German, French, Russian, English, Latin; philosophy, history, geography, mathematics, chemistry, physics, biology, mineralogy, singing, music, drawing, religious education (Catholic, Protestant), physical training – these subjects were taught as compulsory in the 1930s up to the schoolyear 1948/49. Voluntary subjects were: stenography, manual training, handiwork, cooking.
- In the schoolyear 1922/23 calligraphy, psychology and descriptive geometry were also taught.
- In the schoolyear 2008/2009 these subjects are taught: languages – Polish, Czech, English, German, Russian; civics, history, geography, mathematics, physics, chemistry, biology, IT, musical or aesthetic education, physical training - as compulsory.
- Voluntary subjects (3rd and 4th class): biological, chemical, mathematical, geographical, historical, civic and Polish language seminars.

== Alumni ==
- Franciszek Bajorek, lawyer and politician
- Józef Berger, theologian and politician
- Wiesław Adam Berger, writer
- Józef Chlebowczyk, historian
- Adolf Fierla, writer and poet
- Janusz Gaudyn, writer and poet
- Bronisław Poloczek, actor
