= Bjørk =

Bjørk is a Faroese and Norwegian given name meaning "birch". Bjørk also appears as a family name.

The Icelandic & Swedish spelling of the name is Björk. Notable people with the name include:

- Liv Bjørk, Norwegian handball goalkeeper
- Bjørk Nørremark (born 2002), Danish para-athlete
- Bjørk Herup Olsen (born 1991), Faroese middle and long-distance runner
