= Bjarne Jullum =

Norwegian newspaper editor (1894–1973)

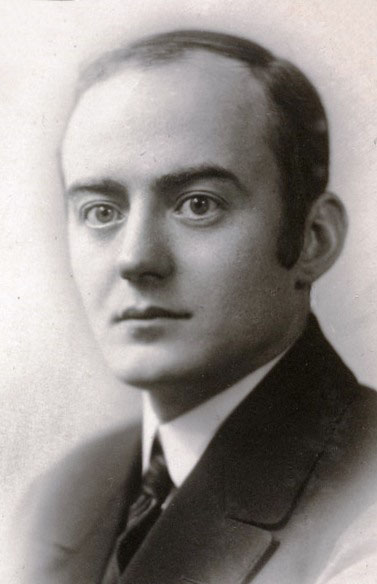
Bjarne Jullum

Bjarne Jullum (25 June 1894 – 22 September 1973) was a Norwegian journalist, cooperativist and politician for the Labour and Communist parties.

== Personal life ==
He was born in Bodø Municipality as a son of Casper Westad Jullum (1868–1907) and Katharina Marie Dahl (1874–1963). In 1917 he married Ellen Marie Jullum from Stjørdal Municipality. He died in September 1973 and was buried at Vestre Aker Church.

== Journalism and politics ==
After finishing middle school in 1910 and a book printer apprenticeship in 1914, he was hired as a subeditor in the party newspaper Nordlands Social-Demokrat. Already in the same year he became subeditor in Bratsberg-Demokraten, before working in Ny Tid from 1915 to 1917. After two years in Sosialdemokratisk pressekontor he worked in Arbeiderbladet from 1919.

When the Communist Party split from Labour in 1923, Jullum was hired in their main newspaper Norges Kommunistblad where he stayed until 1926. In 1927 he rejoined the Labour Party. He was hired as editor-in-chief of Tidens Krav. From 1928 to 1964 he worked in Arbeiderbladet. He was acting editor for five months in 1940. In April 1940, Norway was invaded by Germany. Jullum was acting editor until September 1940, when the newspaper was shut down for the remainder of World War II. He was also a board member of the Norwegian Press Association from 1930 to 1936.

== Cooperativism and garden movement ==
As a politician he held his first secretary post in Bodø Municipality in 1910. He chaired the local section of Norges Socialdemokratiske Ungdomsforening from 1912 to 1914 and vice-chaired the Kristiania section from 1917 to 1918. He was a member of the municipal council of Aker Municipality from 1923 to 1925 and 1929 to 1931, and chaired Aker Communist Party from 1924 to 1926. He was also a trade unionist, serving as supervisory council member of Oslo faglige samorg, and involved in the cooperative movement. He was a board member of the local co-op Ullevål Samvirkelag from 1919 to 1921, and then chaired it from 1921 to 1966. In Norges Kooperative Landsforening he was a board member from 1927 to 1930 and 1946 to 1960, serving as deputy chair from 1946 to 1958. He chaired the local branch from 1928 to 1963. He wrote 50th-anniversary books for the co-ops in Bodø and Ullevål.

He lived in the garden community Ullevål Hageby and chaired the local housing co-operative Oslo Havebyselskap from 1968 to 1971. He also wrote 50th-anniversary books for Oslo Havebyselskap and the local welfare association Ullevål Hagebys Vel, as well as two books (25th and 50th anniversaries) for the People's House.

He chaired NKLs Tobakksfabrikk, Prior Radiofabrikk and Termolux Fabrikker and board member of Holmenkolbanen from 1948 to 1949, Norsk Folkeferie from 1948 to 1968, Tiden Norsk Forlag from 1949 to 1967. He was a supervisory council member of Akers Sparebank from 1924 to 1926 and 1962 to 1967, and of Samvirkebanken (chairman) from 1963 to 1964.
