= Therese Björk =

Swedish footballer

Personal information
- Full name: Therese Björk
- Date of birth: 15 September 1981 (age 45)
- Place of birth: Sweden
- Height: 1.63 m (5 ft 4 in)
- Position: Midfielder

Team information
- Current team: Bergdalens IK
- Number: 5

Senior career*
Years	Team	Apps	(Gls)
2009–2014	Kristianstads DFF	113	(3)
2015–2016	Vittsjö GIK	28	(1)
2017	Glimåkra IF		
2017–2018	Apollon Ladies F.C.		
2018–	Bergdalens IK		
- * Club domestic league appearances and goals as of 23 May 2016

Therese Björk (born 15 September 1981) is a Swedish footballer who plays for Bergdalens IK.

== Titles ==
Kristianstads

Runner-up

- Svenska Cupen: 2013–14
