= Piotr Feliks =

Polish teacher and social activist (1883–1941)

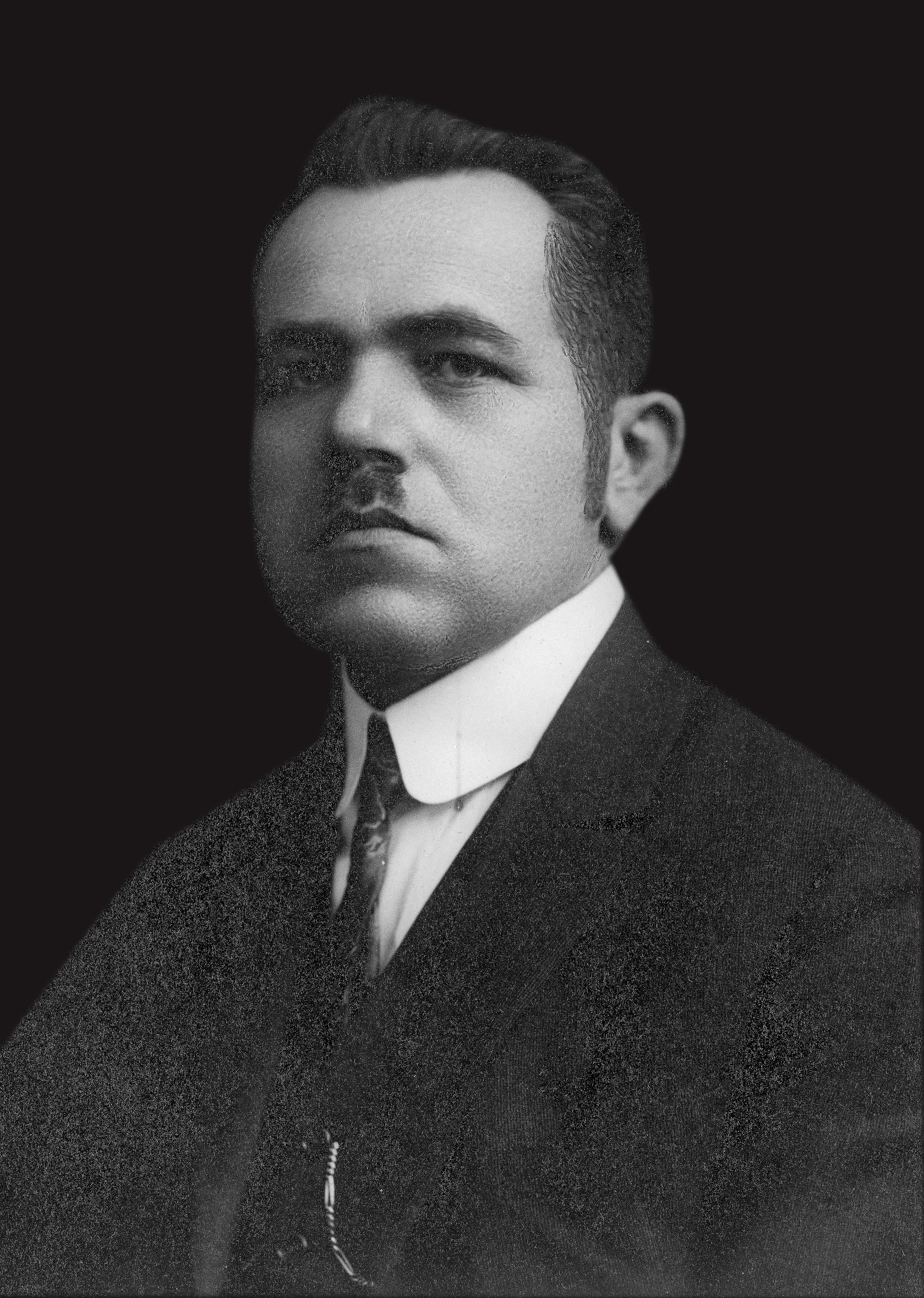
Piotr Feliks's Portrait

Piotr Feliks (11 June 1883 in Bierówka near Jasło – 3 or 12 August 1941) was a Polish political, social and education activist.

Feliks, the son of a labourer, graduated from gymnasium in Jasło, and then studied philology at the Jagiellonian University, spending the last year of his studies at the Ludwig-Maximilians-Universität München. He was hired as a teacher at the Juliusz Słowacki Polish Grammar School in Orłowa in Cieszyn Silesia (now Orlová, Czech Republic). He became the director of the school four years later.

He was imprisoned and murdered during the Second World War at Auschwitz concentration camp.
