= Janusz Gaudyn =

Polish physician, writer and poet

- Born: 25 February 1935; Katowice, Poland
- Died: 22 June 1984 (aged 49); Třinec, Czechoslovakia
- Citizenship: Czechoslovak
- Occupations: Physician, poet, writer
- Children: three

Janusz Gaudyn (25 February 1935 – 22 June 1984) was a Polish physician, writer and poet. He is known mostly for his aphorisms.

== Biography ==
Gaudyn lived since 1939 in the Trans-Olza region and spent his youth in Fryštát. He graduated from the Juliusz Słowacki Polish Gymnasium in Orlová and later from medical studies at the Palacký University in Olomouc. He worked as an internist in the hospital in Český Těšín and later as a general practitioner in Střítež, he lived in Třinec. Gaudyn was a member of the Polish Cultural and Educational Union and several literary organizations.

== Works ==
- Fraszki i fraszeczki (1967)
- Zdania (1969)
- Duet (1969) (together with Gabriel Palowski)
- List (1980)
- My (1980)
- Z tej ziemi : 129 fraszek o miłości (1983)
