= Anders Eldrup =

Danish business leader

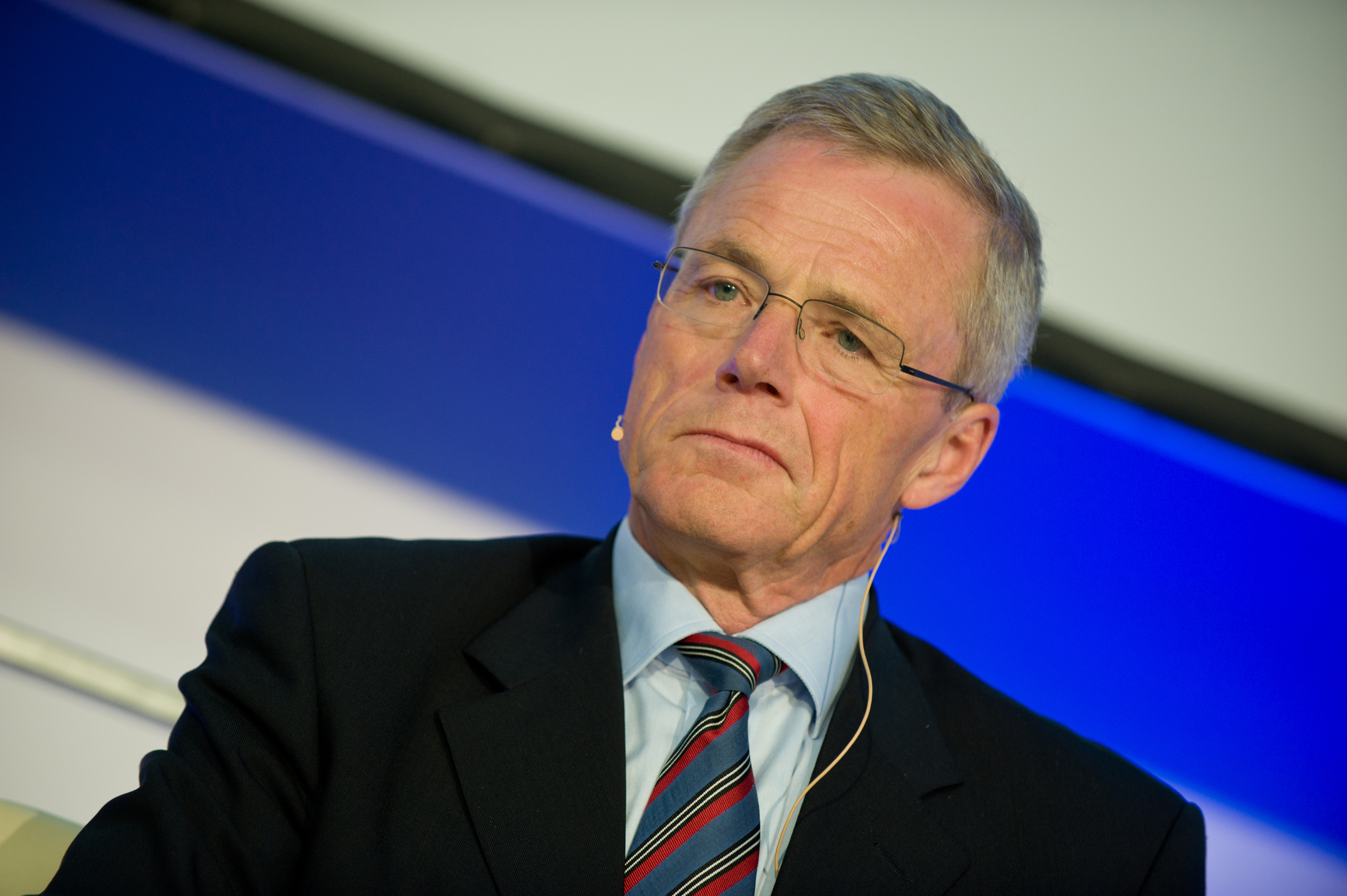
Anders Eldrup in 2010

Anders Eldrup (born October 30, 1948) is a Danish business leader who for years has been a central figure in Danish politics and business. He was previously Permanent Secretary at the Danish Ministry of Finance, and since 2001 Eldrup has taken the position as CEO. First directing the Danish oil and gas company DONG (an abbreviation for Danish Oil and Natural Gas), then from 2006 CEO of DONG Energy – the result of one of Denmark's largest mergers in history between DONG and five other Danish energy companies.

== Background ==
Anders Eldrup was born in Ebeltoft in Denmark. His father was an Estate Manager and the mother was a School Teacher. He graduated from Grenaa High-School in 1967 and hereafter started to study Political Science at Aarhus University. In 1972 he graduated as MA in political science. In 1994 he married Merete Eldrup, who has been the CEO of Danish Broadcasting Network TV2. They met while she was employed at the Ministry of Finance from 1988 to 1992. They live in Copenhagen, and have two children together as well as two children each from previous marriages.

== Career overview ==
Employed at the National Audit Office (1972–73) Principal, Ministry of Finance, Budget Department (1973–80) Personal Secretary to the Minister, Ministry of Finance (1980–84) Head of Department, Ministry of Finance (1984–1988) Head of Division, Ministry of Finance (1988–1990) Director in the Department of Budget, Ministry of Finance (1990–1991) Permanent Secretary of State, Ministry of Finance (1991-01) CEO of DONG (2001–06) CEO of DONG Energy (2006–2012)

== Professional biography ==
Anders Eldrup began his professional career at the same time as Denmark was hit by the 1973 oil crisis. The crisis had a negative effect on the basis of the Danish economy. Before the oil crisis, Denmark received more than 90 percent of its energy from oil, and over 90 percent of the oil was imported from the Middle East. The oil crisis made oil prices quadruple and it affected the balance of payments whose deficit doubled in two years. Eldrup has described how the first oil crisis showed to him the danger of placing all of ones eggs in one basket.

The poor economy of the 1970s continued into the 1980s. Eldrup has mentioned how humiliating it was to be part of the Danish delegation that came to New York City in the early '80s to lend money to the Danish State. According to Eldrup himself it was his aim to contribute to re-establishing Denmark's economy. In the 1980s he was mainly occupied with reforms of state budget management and with a new model for budgetary cooperation between Danish state and the municipalities.

In 1991 Anders Eldrup was appointed Permanent Secretary of State at the Ministry of Finance. As Secretary of State, he sought to restructure the Ministry of Finance and to give it a more central position in the social debate. Throughout the 90s, the Ministry of Finance became a key player in the central administration and prepared a wide range of the major political reforms of the 90s.

In 2001, Anders Eldrup left the Ministry of Finance and took up his position at DONG. This was a goodbye to nearly 30 years in the ministry under different Danish Ministers of Finance from the political left and right such as Anders Andersen, Knud Heinesen, Svend Jakobsen, Henning Christophersen, Palle Simonsen, Henning Dyremose and Mogens Lykketoft. During the latter two, Eldrup acted as Permanent Secretary of State.

=== Private sector ===
Anders Eldrup served as Vice President of DONG's board while he was Secretary of State. Over the next years he headed the transformation from DONG to DONG Energy – a merger between DONG and five other Danish energy companies, Elsam, Energi E2, Nesa, Københavns Energi (only the power division) and Frederiksberg Forsyning (only the power division). The merger meant that DONG went from being a Danish company, importing and trading natural gas, to be a North European energy company producing and trading electricity, heat, oil and natural gas and distributing electricity and natural gas.

In the autumn of 2008, Anders Eldrup stated that DONG Energy is to develop from being a company, where most of the electricity and power is produced from fossil fuels to a company where renewable energy dominates. Eldrup calls this the 85/15 vision because today, about 85 percent of DONG Energy's heat and power production comes from fossil fuels whereas 15 percent comes from renewable energy. Eldrup has declared that by 2040 DONG Energy will have changed the fraction, so that 85 percent come from renewable energy and by 2020, half of DONG Energy's heat and power production will come from renewable energy.

Eldrup has repeatedly urged politicians participating in international climate negotiations to adopt ambitious and long-term CO_{2} emissions reduction targets to secure a high price on carbon, which would make it more expensive to pollute. Eldrup emphasizes that this will speed up the global development of renewable energy even more. At the 2009 United Nations Climate Change Conference Eldrup was chosen to speak to the delegates at the COP15 as the representative of the international business community. His key message was that an ambitious, predictable and transparent climate agreement would constitute a framework that could facilitate the business community's necessary investments in low carbon technologies.

== Memberships ==
In 2010 Anders Eldrup co-founded Green Growth Leaders (GGL), an initiative which works to accelerate green growth with the vision of building prosperous, green economies and communities. Today Eldrup is a member of the council. .

Eldrup is also a member of VL-group 1 of the Danish Top Executive Network.

2007–2009 Eldrup, was a member of Copenhagen Climate Council, a group of international business leaders, scientists and policy experts. Copenhagen Climate Council worked for the adoption of an ambitious climate agreement at the 2009 UN Climate Change Conference in Copenhagen.

From 2007 to 2009 Anders Eldrup was also a member of the Danish Government's Business Climate Panel, which, based on analyses, presentations and recommendations, advised the government, nationally and internationally about activities and issues related to environmental technology and the climate change conference. Eldrup has also been involved in the Bilderberg Group annual conference from 2001 to 2010. He is a former member of the group's steering committee.

== Positions of trust ==
Anders Eldrup is the chairman of the Copenhagen Cleantech Cluster and chairman of Offshoreenergy.dk (formerly known as Offshore Center Danmark). Moreover, he is member of a number of boards including the Rockwool Foundation, Terma A/S, Lindoe Offshore Renewables Center (foundation), Experimentarium and Technical University of Denmark – DTU.
