= Adolf Fierla =

Polish writer and poet (1908-1967)

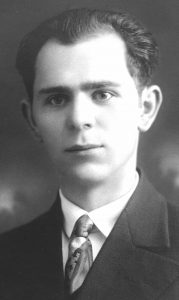
- Adolf Fierla
- Born: 16 January 1908; Orlová, Austria-Hungary
- Died: 8 September 1967 (aged 59); London, United Kingdom
- Citizenship: Czechoslovak, British
- Occupations: Educator, poet, writer
- Writing career
- Language: Polish, Cieszyn Silesian dialect

Adolf Fierla (16 January 1908 – 8 September 1967) was a Polish Czech writer and poet.

== Life and career ==
He was born 16 January 1908 in Orlová to a coal miner's family and graduated from the local Juliusz Słowacki Polish Gymnasium. Fierla later studied Polish studies at the Jagiellonian University in Kraków and Slavic studies in Prague. He later worked as a teacher of Polish language at Polish primary schools in Trans-Olza and eventually at the Polish Gymnasium in Orlová.

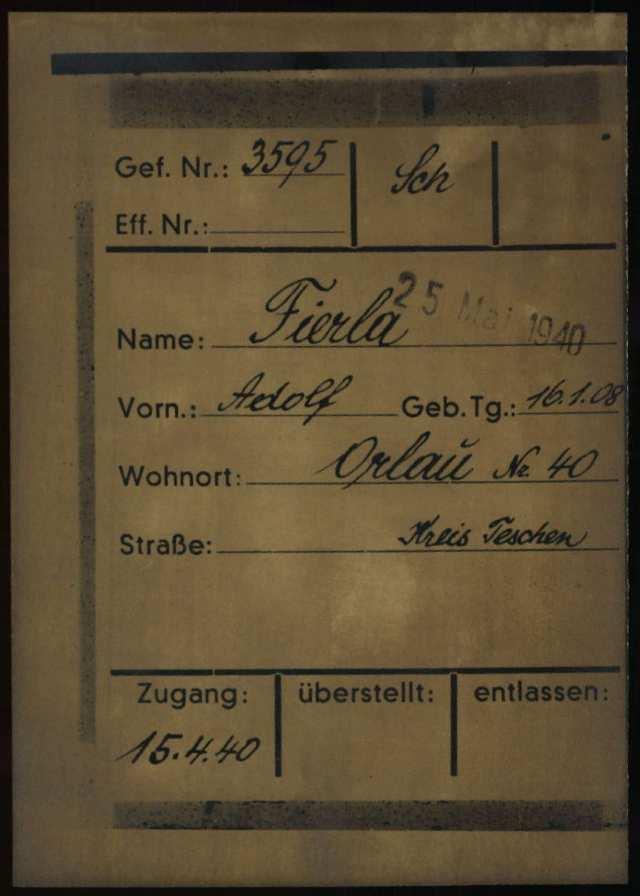
Registration card of Adolf Fierla as a prisoner at Dachau concentration camp

When World War II broke out Fierla fled like many other Poles to the east. After his return Nazi German authorities jailed him in 1940 and incarcerated in Dachau and later in Mauthausen-Gusen concentration camps. Released from the camp, he worked as a worker in Pietwałd. In 1944 Fierla was forced to join the German Army and was captured in France by the British forces. Fierla then stayed in the Western Europe, initially in Italy, where he taught in lyceum for Polish girls in Porto San Giorgio; in France, where he taught in one of Polish gymnasiums, and then from 1958 in the United Kingdom. He continued his literary life there cooperating with Polish press and several other organizations of which he was a member, e.g. Zrzeszenie Ewangelików Polaków w Wielkiej Brytanii (Association of Polish Protestants in the United Kingdom). Fierla died on 8 September 1967 in London and is buried in the Finchley district of London.

Fierla wrote his works in literary Polish and also in Cieszyn Silesian dialect. He focused mainly on the life of the people of Cieszyn Silesia, especially those of the Beskids mountain ranges and coal basin around the city of Karviná. His works includes many religious motives. Fierla also translated the works of Czech poet Jiří Wolker to Polish.

Fierla's typical motive of his native coal mining region can be observed in the Kopalnie (Coal Mines) poem from his debut poetry collection Przydrożne kwiaty (Roadside Flowers):

Today I have toured the divine world
Humbled and begging;
And bitter tears came to my eyes
Flowing ceaselessly,
As the quiet fields of all villages
Have been changed into coal mines.

I have toured a quiet patch today
Where flowers once used to grow,
And where a ram and a sheep grazed
Along a footpath near the hut,
And where today, instead of straight grasses
A day of bloody repayment roars.

I stood today at the threshold of a shaft
In the worry of a steamy moment,
When the miners black from coal
Went down into the drift.
And my soul was touched by dry pain:
As they took out a man broken to pieces

— Adolf Fierla,

== Works ==
- Przydrożne kwiaty (1928) – poetry collection
- Ondraszek (1930/1931) – novel
- Cienie i blaski (1931) – poetry collection
- Hałdy i inne opowiadania górnicze (1931) – short stories collection
- Dziwy na groniach (1932) – poetry collection
- Kopalnia słoneczna (1933) – poetry collection
- Kolędy beskidzkie (1935)
- Kamień w polu (1938) – short stories collection
- Poezje religijne (1971)
