= Bjarne Klavestad =

Norwegian footballer (1905-1930)

Personal information
- Date of birth: 21 September 1905
- Date of death: 10 May 1930 (aged 24)

International career
Years	Team	Apps	(Gls)
1926	Norway	2	(0)

Bjarne Klavestad (21 September 1905 – 10 May 1930) was a Norwegian footballer. He played in two matches for the Norway national football team in 1926.
