= Bjarni Sveinbjörnsson =

Icelandic footballer

Personal information
- Full name: Bjarni Sveinbjörnsson
- Date of birth: 1963 (age 62–63)
- Place of birth: Iceland
- Position: Striker

Senior career*
Years	Team	Apps	(Gls)
1981–1992	Þór Akureyri	108	(36)
1993	ÍBV	16	(5)
1994	Þór Akureyri	18	(11)
1995	Dalvík	16	(11)

International career
1980	Iceland U19	3	(0)
1985	Iceland	1	(0)
- * Club domestic league appearances and goals

Bjarni Sveinbjörnsson (born 1963) is a retired Icelandic footballer who played as a striker. He spent the majority of his playing career with Þór Akureyri, but also spent spells with ÍBV and Dalvík. Bjarni won one cap for the Iceland national football team, coming on as a substitute for Guðmundur Steinsson in the 1–0 win over the Faroe Islands on 12 July 1985. He also made three appearances for the Iceland U19 team.
