= Bjarne Bassøe =

Norwegian engineer (1892–1975)

- Born: 18 April 1892; Kristiania, Norway
- Died: 24 February 1975 (aged 82)
- Occupation: Engineer
- Organization: Den Norske Ingeniørforening
- Awards: Order of the Polar Star; Order of St. Olav

Bjarne Bassøe (18 April 1892 – 24 February 1975) was a Norwegian engineer.

Bassøe was born in Kristiania to colonel Hans Christian Bassøe and Elisabeth Haslund, and married Johanne Margrete Boye Semb in 1927. He graduated as construction engineer from the Norwegian Institute of Technology in 1914, and subsequently worked as railway engineer and in water supply. From 1931 to 1957 he served as secretary-general for the trade union Den Norske Ingeniørforening (NIF), (except for 1941-45). In June 1941, during the German occupation of Norway he was dismissed from his position as secretary-general, and a Nazi collaborator took his place. Bassøe was imprisoned and held at the Grini detention camp in 1941 and from 1942 to 1944. He was decorated Knight, First Class of the Order of St. Olav in 1951, and Knight of the Swedish Order of the Polar Star. He died in 1975.

== Selected works ==
- Bassøe, Bjarne, ed. (1935). Studentene fra 1910: Biografiske oplysninger samlet til 25-års-jubileet 1935 (in Norwegian). Oslo: J. Chr. Gundersen, Boktrykkeri.
- Bassøe, Bjarne, ed. (1960). Studentene fra 1910: Biografiske opplysninger samlet til 50-års-jubileet 1960 (in Norwegian). Oslo: P.M. Bye & Co.
- Bassøe, Bjarne, ed. (1961). Ingeniørmatrikkelen: norske sivilingeniører 1901–55 med tillegg (in Norwegian). Oslo: Teknisk ukeblad.
