= Prior Radiofabrikk =

Norwegian radio manufacturing company

Prior Radiofabrikk was a radio manufacturing company in Oslo, Norway.

It was established in 1949, and was owned and run by the cooperative Norges Kooperative Landsforening. The production facility was located at Bjølsen, co-located with Margarinfabrikken Norge. The company was bought by Luma Fabrikker in 1962, and production ceased in 1963.
