= Bjarne Rosén =

Norwegian footballer (1909-1989)

Personal information
- Date of birth: 16 September 1909
- Date of death: 6 November 1989 (aged 80)

International career
Years	Team	Apps	(Gls)
1931–1934	Norway	5	(0)

Bjarne Rosén (16 September 1909 – 6 November 1989) was a Norwegian footballer. He played in five matches for the Norway national football team from 1931 to 1934.
