= Björn Tielebein =

German politician (born 1983)

- Tielebein in 2025

Member of the Berlin House of Representatives
- Incumbent
- Assumed office 29 October 2026

Personal details
- Born: 1983 (age 42–43)
- Party: Die Linke

Björn Tielebein (born 1983) is a German politician who was elected member of the Berlin House of Representatives in 2026. He has served as managing director of Die Linke in Berlin since 2025.
