= Bjarne Gulbrandsen =

Norwegian footballer (1889-1966)

Personal information
- Date of birth: 16 April 1889
- Date of death: 29 August 1966 (aged 77)

International career
Years	Team	Apps	(Gls)
1913	Norway	1	(0)

Bjarne Gulbrandsen (16 April 1889 – 29 August 1966) was a Norwegian footballer. He played in one match for the Norway national football team in 1913.
