= Bjarne Moe =

Norwegian economist (1948–2019)

Anders Bjarne Moe (1948–2019) was an economist and Norwegian civil servant. He held a cand.oecon. degree from the University of Oslo. In 1988, he was appointed as Director General of the Oil Division of the Norwegian Ministry of Petroleum and Energy. Moe was a member of several government commissions, committees, and boards:

- Statfjord Commission – Leader
- Statfjord Natural Gas Transport Commission – Leader
- Murchison Commission – Leader
- Ekofisk-Teesside Commission – Leader
- Ekofisk-Emden Commission – Leader
- Frigg Commission – Leader
- Council on War Readiness on the Norwegian Continental Shelf – Leader
- NATO Wartime Oil Organization – Norwegian representative
- Petroleum Price Board
- Natural Gas Commission
- Heimdal Commission
- Committee on Investments on the Norwegian Continental Shelf

Moe has also served as a diplomat at the Norwegian Embassy in Washington, DC, U.S.
