= Bjarne Bogen =

Norwegian immunologist (born 1951)

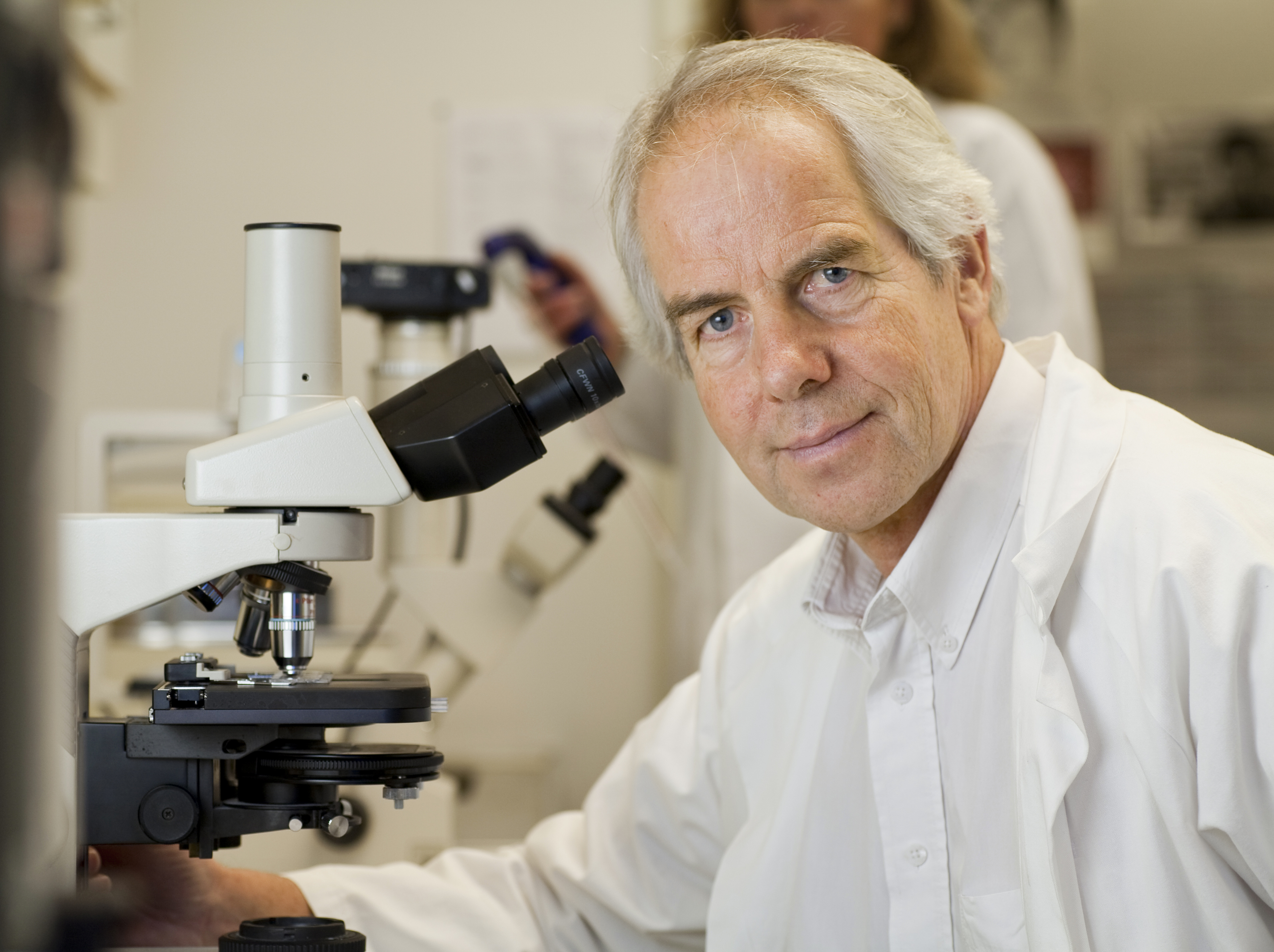
- Bjarne Bogen
- Born: Bjarne Bogen; 18 January 1951; Oslo, Norway
- Occupation: Professor of immunology

Academic background
- Education: University of Oslo

Academic work
- Institutions: University of Oslo, University of Tromsø, Norwegian School of Veterinary Science, Basel Institute for Immunology, Stanford University and Dana–Farber Cancer Institute
- Main interests: Immunology, DNA vaccination

Bjarne Bogen (born 18 January 1951) is a Norwegian immunologist, inventor and physician. He is widely known for his research on DNA vaccines, autoimmune disorders and cancer immunology. In recognition of his contributions, he was appointed Knight 1st Class of the Royal Norwegian Order of St. Olav in October 2025.

== Career ==
Bogen graduated with a medical degree from the University of Oslo in 1977. In the following two years, he completed his internship at Sandnessjøen Hospital and in Lurøy Municipality and Træna Municipality at the coastline of northern Norway. In 1984, at the University of Tromsø he defended his PhD thesis entitled "Murine Th and B Lymphocyte Recognition of Isologous Immunoglobulin".

Since 1986, Bogen has been working at the Institute for Clinical Medicine at the University of Oslo, first as an associate professor before becoming full professor in 1993. In 1991, he was authorized as a specialist in clinical immunology, and has since 1995 had a part-time position as a senior consultant at the Oslo University Hospital. He was director of the KG Jebsen Centre for Influenza Vaccine Research (JIV) from 2013 to 2019.

During his scientific career, Bogen has been a guest researcher at the Basel Institute for Immunology (1985–87), Stanford University (1996–97), Dana–Farber Cancer Institute (2004–05) and The Scripps Research Institute (2005, 2019–20).

Bogen is a fellow of the Norwegian Academy of Science and Letters since 2007. From 1997 to 2019, he was a member of the Editorial Board for Scandinavian Journal of Immunology and from 2005 to 2007 for the journal Hematologica. Throughout his career, he has supervised 27 PhD-students, along with 23 students enrolled in either MSc or MD-PhD student programs.

In 2018, Bogen became an honorary Member of the Norwegian Society for Immunology. In 2020 he was awarded the King Olav V Cancer Research Prize by the Norwegian Cancer Society for his work within cancer immunology and his contribution to development of personalized cancer vaccines (Vaccibody), as well as the Innovation Price of the University of Oslo for his research on DNA vaccines.

== Research ==
Throughout his career, Bogen has published more than 220 scientific papers, among them in scientific journals such as Cell, Immunity, Nature Biotechnology and Nature Communications.

In the early 1990s, Bogen and co-workers discovered a new type of collaboration between T and B-cells (Idiotype-driven T-B collaboration) and how such collaboration can, under unfortunate circumstances, lead to the development of autoimmune disorders and B cell lymphomas.

In another vein of research, Bogen et al. demonstrated that CD4 T-cells, in collaboration with macrophages, can kill cancer cells such as multiple myeloma cells in an antitumor immune response. Bogen has received the Senior Research Award from the U.S. Multiple Myeloma Research Foundation (2002, 2004 and 2008).

In yet another direction of research, Bogen and co-workers have developed new types of vaccine molecules known as Troybodys (Medinnova prize 1998) and Vaccibodies (Medinnova prize 2003). Vaccibodies have been developed as preclinical DNA vaccines for infectious diseases such as influenza as well as for different types of cancers. The biotech company Vaccibody AS was founded by Bogen and co-workers in 2007.

== Teaching ==
During the last 30 years, Bogen has given lectures for medical students and physicians in basic and clinical immunology. From 1998 to 2013, he was the Head of Studies of Immunology at the Faculty of Medicine, University of Oslo. In 2000, he published the textbook "Immunologi" (English: "Immunology") together with professor Ludvig A. Munthe, for which they received the TanoAschehoug's-prize.
