= Axlar-Björn =

Icelandic serial killer

Björn Pétursson
- Born: c. 1555; Iceland
- Died: 1596 (aged 40–41); Iceland
- Other name: Axlar-Björn
- Spouse: Þórdís Ólafsdóttir
- Children: Sveinn "Skotti" Björnsson
- Status: Executed
- Penalty: Death

Details
- Victims: 9–18
- Span of crimes: 1570–1596
- Country: Iceland
- Location: Snæfellsnes
- Date apprehended: 1596

Björn Pétursson (c. 1555–1596) was the only known serial killer in the history of Iceland. He was nicknamed Axlar-Björn, with Axlar being genitive of Öxl, his place of residence.

== Early life ==
Axlar-Björn was the youngest of three children born to an Icelandic farmer couple. He lived at Öxl, west of Búðir, in Snæfellsnes.

== Murders ==
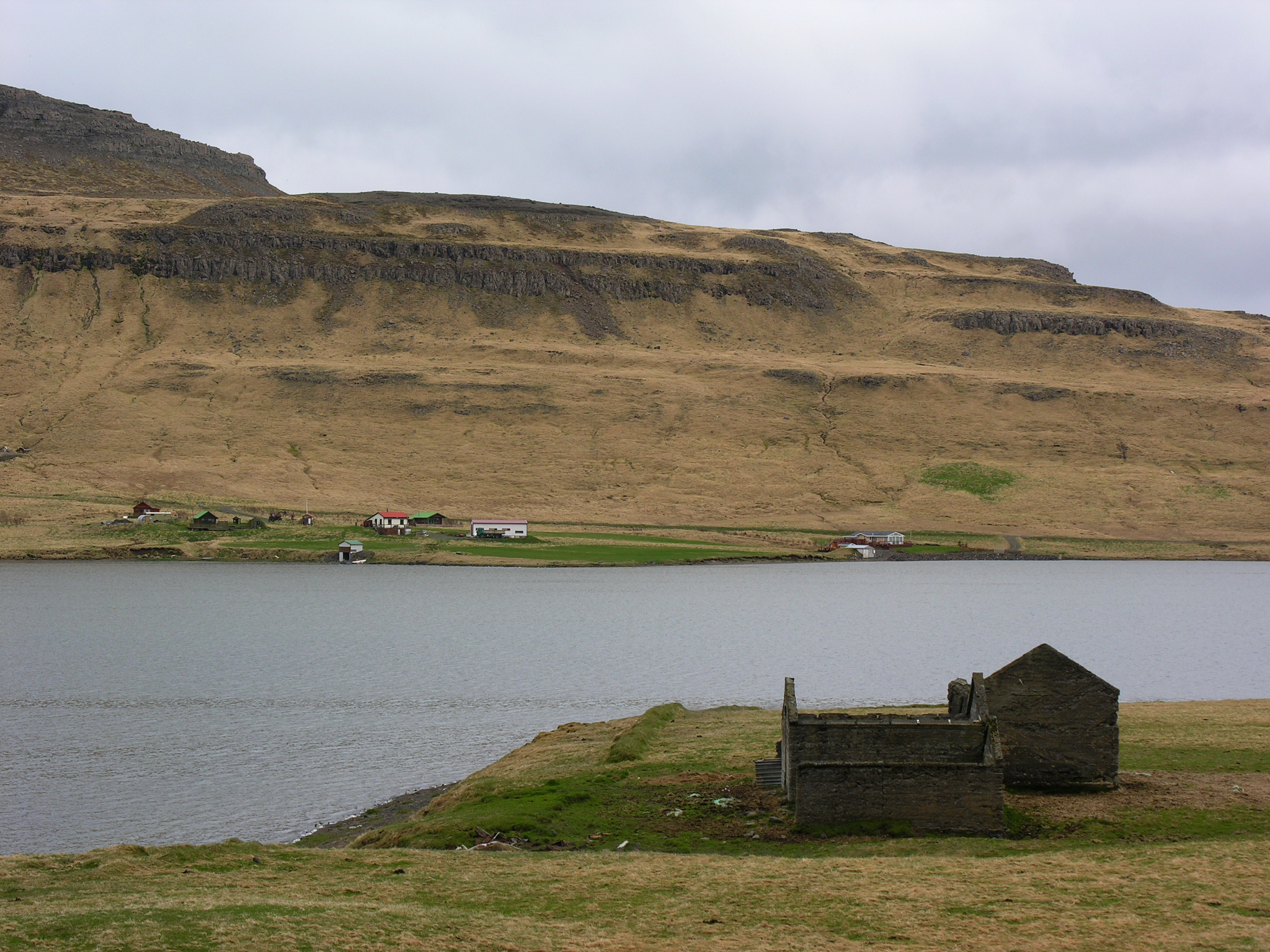
Abandoned farms in Snæfellsnes

When he was 15 years old, Axlar-Björn began to help on the farm of a rich neighbour named Ormur, in exchange for room and board. Ormur died some years later from natural causes and left his estates to his son, Guðmundur. Guðmundur had become friends with Axlar-Björn during his employment and gifted him a farm called Öxl in the Breidavik region of Snæfellsnes. Axlar-Björn took residence there with his wife, Þórdís Ólafsdóttir.

Many legends have been written about Björn and his malice. However, these were recorded 250–300 years after the time of the execution. His story is interwoven with legends and full of folkloric motifs. The accounts differ on the motives, modus operandi, number of victims, and events that led to the arrest of Axlar-Björn. The most common claims are that he killed either nine or eighteen people. The victims were travellers and farmhands who came to Öxl looking for work; some versions say that he hacked them with his axe, and others that he drowned them. Local suspicions about Axlar-Björn grew as people disappeared in the area, while his horses and other possessions increased, but he was safe because of the protection given to him by Guðmundur.

== Arrest and execution ==
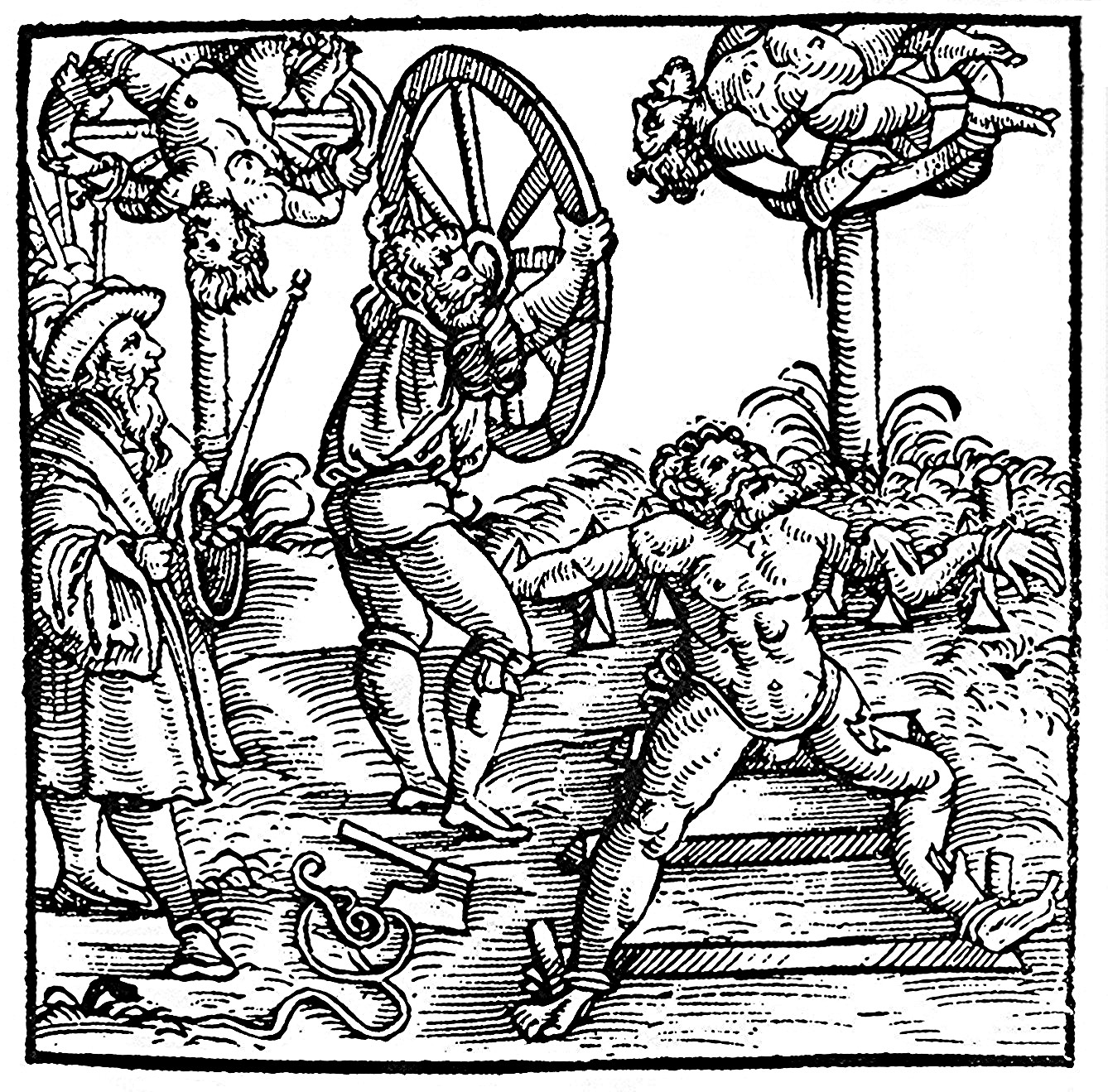
A contemporary depiction of a breaking wheel

Axlar-Björn was arrested and confessed to nine murders, but authorities found more bodies when they searched his farm. Asked about them, Axlar-Björn claimed that he had found the remains buried in his land and decided to re-bury them in another place without notifying authorities or bringing them to a cemetery. The authorities did not believe this explanation. A þing sentenced Axlar-Björn to die by hanging followed by breaking on the wheel. After his death, his body was dismembered and each piece was put on a stake. Þórdís, who was pregnant at the time, was forced to watch the execution.

== Family aftermath ==
Þórdís was accused of assisting her husband in the murders and even of committing some of the murders herself. She was also sentenced to death, but the execution was not carried out. The son she was carrying, Sveinn "Skotti" Björnsson, grew up to be a vagrant and a criminal and was hanged for rape in 1648. Sveinn's own son, Gísli "Hrokur" Sveinsson, was also a criminal and also executed in 1657 for the robbery of a man named Hrafna Gunnarsson which resulted in the death of the man and his servant Hiloki.

Gisli's last words before his execution are said to have been "If I were free I would kill you all and eat your flesh!".

== Modern references ==
Úlfar Þormóðsson wrote about him in a historical novel, Þrjár sólir svartar (Reykjavík: Höfundur. 1988). Megas (Magnús Þór Jónsson) wrote about him in his book Björn og Sveinn: eða Makleg málagjöld (Reykjavík: Mál og menning. 1994). And, in 2012, the Icelandic theatre group Vesturport set up the play Axlar-Björn which is based on legends about Björn and his wife.

== See also ==
- List of serial killers by country

== Other sources ==
- Alda Sigmundsdottir (2019) Icelandic Folk Legends: Tales of apparitions, outlaws and things unseen (Little Books Publishing) ISBN 978-1970125054
