= Torkjell Berulfsen =

Norwegian television personality (1943–2024)

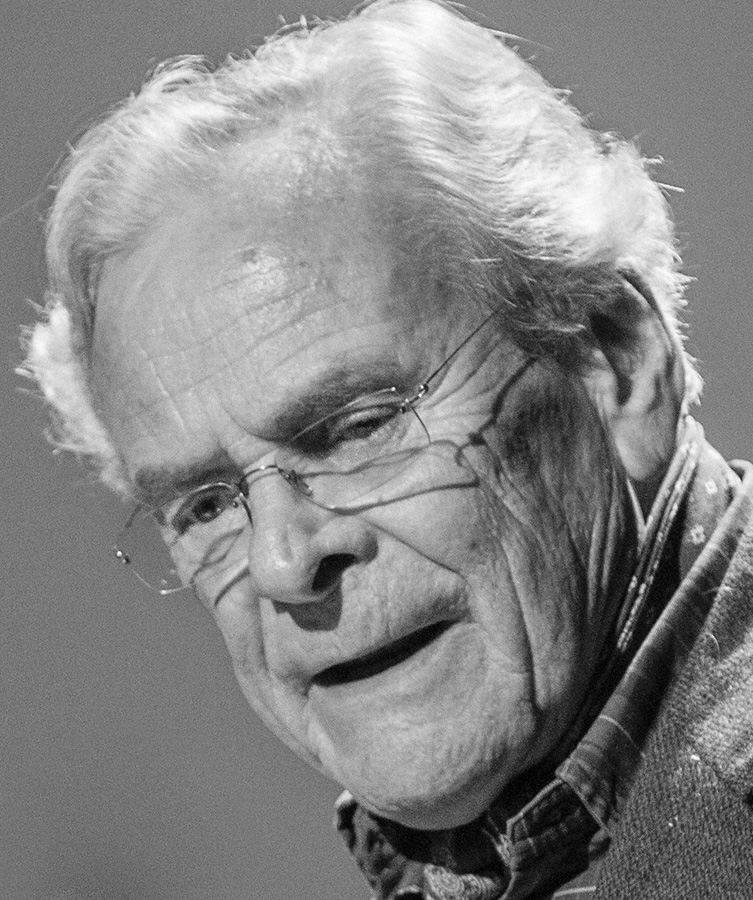
Berulfsen in 2016

Torkjell Berulfsen (20 January 1943 – 24 July 2024) was a Norwegian television personality.

== Life and career ==
Born on 24 July 1943, he was the son of the linguist Bjarne Berulfsen. He took his education at the University of Oslo, graduating in the English language. He worked at the University College London from 1967 to 1968, and was later an editor of a Norwegian-English dictionary. He started working for the Norwegian Broadcasting Corporation in 1971, and presented many television and radio shows. He won Gullruten awards in 2002 and 2007. Berulfsen died on 24 July 2024, at the age of 81.
