= Boris Bjarni Akbashev =

Soviet-born Icelandic handball player and coach (1933–2023)

Personal information
- Full name: Boris Abokhai Akbashev
- Nationality: Icelandic
- Born: 12 July 1933 Moscow, Soviet Union
- Died: 19 April 2023 (aged 89) Reykjavík, Iceland

Sport
- Sport: Handball
National team
- Years: Team
- –: Soviet Union

Teams managed
- Years: Team
- 1962–1980: SK Kountsevo Moscow
- 1980–1982: Valur
- 1989–1992: Breiðablik
- 1992–1994: Valur
- 1994–1995: Hapoel
- 1995–199?: Valur
- 1999–2001: ÍBV

Boris Bjarni Akbashev (12 July 1933 – 19 April 2023) was a Soviet-born Icelandic handball coach and player. Credited with revolutionizing the training methods in Iceland, he has been called the Godfather of Icelandic handball.

Akbashev was born and raised in Moscow in the Soviet Union. He played for the Soviet national handball team in the 1960s and later became the technical and endurance coach of the team intermittently between 1967 and 1972, including at the World Championships and Olympics.

Akbashev became the coach of SK Kountsevo Moscow in 1962 and coached the team until 1980, helping them to the Soviet Men's Handball Championship in 1966, 1967 and 1969.

After having discussions with Víkingur and Ármann, Boris joined Valur in 1980 and stayed for two years. He returned to Iceland in 1989 to coach Breiðablik until 1992, after which he spent most of his time at Valur, except for one season, 1994–95, when he coached Hapoel in Israel where he won both the Israeli championship and the Israeli Cup. He coached the ÍBV from 1999 to 2001 and at the same time was an assistant coach with the Iceland men's national handball team.

Akbashev received Icelandic citizenship in 1997, and took up the name Bjarni at the same time.
