= Joan Palmiter Bajorek =

American entrepreneur, linguist and influencer

- Education: University of Washington; University of California, Davis; University of Arizona
- Occupations: Entrepreneur, linguist, influencer
- Known for: Founder and CEO of Women in Voice and CEO of Clarity AI
- Website: joanpalmiterbajorek.com

Joan Palmiter Bajorek is an American entrepreneur, linguist, and influencer. In August 2018, Bajorek founded Women in Voice, a non-profit 501 organization for women in voice technology. Bajorek is also the CEO of Clarity AI, an AI and software company.

== Early life and education ==
Bajorek grew up in Portland, Oregon, and graduated with a BFA in Photomedia and a BA in French from the University of Washington in 2013, an MA in Linguistics from the University of California, Davis in 2016, and a Ph.D. from the University of Arizona in second language acquisition and teaching. She lives in Seattle, WA.

In 2019, Bajorek completed her Ph.D. Her dissertation title is 'Speaking of Language Technology'.

== Career ==
In August 2018, Bajorek founded Women in Voice, a non-profit 501(c)(3) organization for women in voice technology, specializing in speech technology, artificial intelligence, linguistics technology, multimodal, augmented reality (AR), and virtual reality (VR). Bajorek has raised over $500k with 20+ chapters for Women in Voice. Google Assistant was the first corporate sponsor for the non-profit organization.

Bajorek was previously the VP of Data & Analytics at OneReach.ai, Head of Conversational Research and Strategy at VERSA Agency (beginning in 2019), a consulting advisor at the University of Arizona, Senior Conversational Designer at Nuance, and an Entrepreneur in Residence (EIR) at WeWork Labs. Bajorek is also an advisor to CleanAI and an investor in startups and enterprises.

Bajorek's research and writing has explored how people interact with voice recognition software. In 2019, she wrote for Harvard Business Review on the issue of such software's biases towards the voices of white men. She believes such issues need to be rectified, as voice-enabled software continues to become more popular and integrated with other technology. She has also written on the possibility of speech technology's use in language learning, and has written for Cambridge University Press, UXmatters, and FLTMAG on the development of speech technology and the advantages and disadvantages of various speech technology interfaces.

As a public speaker, she has spoken at the 2019 Voice Summit, CES 2020, 2020 L3-AI by Rasa, Humans of AI, ConveyUX, 2021 MWC Telekom, 2022 Friends of Figma UX@UA, 2023 VentureBeat, and Spotify's Inside Voice podcast which is focused on voice technology.

Bajorek hosts the Your AI Roadmap podcast, which features AI experts who work at companies such as Adobe, Google, Intuit, and Microsoft.

Bajorek published Your AI Roadmap: Actions to Expand Your Career, Money, and Joy in 2025 with Wiley. The book was featured in Forbes article "How Portfolio Careers Are Replacing Traditional Jobs"

== Awards ==
- Women in Voice Awards: The Visionary Award Winner 2022
- 2021 DataEthics4All Top 100 DIET Champion
- 2020’s Amazon Alexa Champion

== See also ==
- Linguistics
- Speech technology
- Language technology
