= Bjarne Redestad =

Swedish footballer (1922–1980)

Senior career*
Years	Team	Apps	(Gls)
- Djurgården
- * Club domestic league appearances and goals

Bjarne Redestad is a Swedish retired footballer. Redestad made 63 Allsvenskan appearances for Djurgården and scored 3 goals.
