= Bjarne Dahl =

American architect (1897–1989)

Bjarne Cato Dahl
- Born: 23 March 1898; Chicago, Illinois, U.S.
- Died: December 29, 1989 (aged 91); Los Altos, Santa Clara County, California, U.S.
- Education: Chicago Technical School
- Occupation: Architect
- Spouse(s): Eve Christine Peterson (m. 1929–1970; death), Thelma Dahl
- Practice: Dahl & Conrad
- Projects: Kaneohe State Hospital Building Complex (1930s)

Bjarne Cato Dahl (1897–1989) was an American architect.

== Early life and education ==
Bjarne Cato Dahl was born on March 23, 1898, in Chicago, Illinois, to parents Catherine (née Beutlich) and Cato Markus Dahl. He attended grammar schools in Chicago; and graduated in 1916 from Lane Technical High School (now Lane Tech College Prep High School).

Dahl attended the Chicago Technical School (later DeVry University), graduating in 1918. From 1919 until 1925, Dahl lived in the San Francisco Bay Area.

== Career ==
Dahl took a job as an architectural drafter for the Territorial Department of Public Works in Hawaii, began working on projects related to the Kaneohe State Hospital in 1926. Dahl decided to serve as an engineer in the U.S. Armed Forces, from 1941 to 1944.

== Notable projects ==
- Cooper Apartments (1939) by Dahl & Conrad, Waikiki, Hawaii

== Personal life ==
Dahl married Eve Christine Peterson in 1929. The Dahls relocated to Los Altos towards the end of World War II and became involved with the Cardinal Hotel in Palo Alto, California. He opened a drafting firm in Palo Alto after the move.

The Dahl's purchased the hotel with his brother in-law George and Sigrid Benedict who also relocated from Hawaii at this time. In 1950 they rehabilitated the hotel and reopened it as the “New Cardinal Hotel.” The Dahl family, in the third generation in 2019, still owns and manages the Cardinal Hotel.

He was a member of the First Methodist Church of Los Altos. He remarried Thelma Dahl, sometime after his first wife's death in 1970.
