= Bjarni Gissurarson =

Icelandic churchman and poet (1621–1712)

Bjarni Gissurarson (1621–1712) was an Icelandic churchman and poet.

== Life and works ==
Bjarni was grandson of the scholar and poet Einar Sigurðsson of Eydalir (ca. 1539–1626), and cousin of Stefán Ólafsson of Vallanes (1618/1619–1688), the latter of whom Bjarni corresponded with in both Icelandic and Latin. His father was the priest at Þingmúli.

Educated at Skálholt, Bjarni spent some time as a scribe for its bishop, Brynjólfur Sveinsson, a leading figure in Icelandic humanist scholarship.

Upon the death of his father in 1647, Bjarni gained the position of priest at Þingmúli in the far east of Iceland, a position he held for the next forty-five years.

Bjarni married a local priest's daughter, Ingibjörg Árnadóttir (1621–1698). They had at least seven children, two of whom died while students in Copenhagen.

Bjarni wrote a large amount of poetry, both in Icelandic and in Latin, largely public rather than personal in tone, which he edited and circulated with care in manuscript form. He work first began to be printed in the eighteenth century. His wide-ranging ouvre included "original and translated hymns, occasional poetry such as funeral poems; laudatory poetry; admonishing and didactic poems; vikivaki (circle-dance) poetry; lullabies; poetry on old age, the art of writing, Bjarni's contemporaries, and current affairs; topographical poetry; humorous poems; and not least ljóðabréf (verse epistles)."
