= Björk (disambiguation) =

Björk (born 1965) is an Icelandic singer-songwriter.

Björk or Bjork may also refer to:

- Björk (name), a Swedish and Icelandic name (including a list of people with the name)
- Björk (album), a 1977 album by Björk
- Björk (book), a book by Björk
- Björk (exhibition), an exhibition at the Museum of Modern Art about Björk
- Björk–Shiley valve, an artificial heart valve
