= Franciszek Bajorek =

Polish lawyer, politician, activist

Member of the Silesian Parliament
- In office 1938–1939

Personal details
- Born: 23 September 1908 Karwina, Austria-Hungary
- Died: 23 November 1987 (aged 79) London, Great Britain
- Resting place: Greenford Cemetery
- Spouse: Jadwiga Bogusz
- Children: Franciszek

Franciszek Bajorek (23 September 1908 – 23 November 1987) was a Polish lawyer, national activist and politician. He was a member of various organizations active amongst the Polish minority in interbellum Czechoslovakia.

== Biography ==
Bajorek was born in the family of Jan Bajorek, a principal of the Polish school in Łazy. In 1926 he graduated from the Juliusz Słowacki Polish Grammar School in Orlová. Later he studied law at the University of Brno, where he earned a doctorate in 1932.

After his university graduation, Bajorek worked in Fryštát, in a law office of Leon Wolf, Polish deputy to the National Assembly in Prague. He was active in the Association of Silesian Catholics, co-founded the Association of Poles in Czechoslovakia in 1938 and chaired the Association of Polish Choirs in Czechoslovakia.

After the annexation of Trans-Olza region to Poland in 1938, President Ignacy Mościcki named him a deputy of the Silesian Parliament, where Bajorek was a deputy until the outbreak of World War II. He was awarded the Knight's Cross of the Order of Polonia Restituta. In November 1938 he entered the local Zaolzie chapter of the Camp of National Unity.

After the defeat of the Polish forces in the September Campaign, Bajorek escaped Germans through Tatras, Hungary and Yugoslavia, and finally ended up with the Polish troops in France. There, he entered the Polish military school, which he finished in Great Britain after the French were defeated by Germans. He decided to stay in Great Britain after 1945, where he established the Association of Cieszyn Silesians, being its chairman for 40 years.

Franciszek Bajorek was considered the main representative of Cieszyn Silesia in the British exile. He also actively participated in the Polish Army Choir and Fryderyk Chopin Choir in London. He died on 23 November 1987 in London and is buried at the Greenford Cemetery.
