= Björn Lilius =

Swedish footballer

Personal information
- Full name: Björn Thomas Lilius
- Date of birth: 2 June 1970 (age 56)
- Place of birth: Helsingborg, Sweden
- Position: Defender

Senior career*
Years	Team	Apps	(Gls)
- Malmö FF
- Helsingborgs IF
- Östers IF

International career
1986	Sweden U17	10	(0)
1986–1988	Sweden U19	14	(0)
1990–1992	Sweden U21/O	21	(1)
- * Club domestic league appearances and goals

Björn Thomas Lilius (born 2 June 1970) is a Swedish former footballer who played as a defender. He represented Sweden at the 1992 Summer Olympics. He also played for domestic Swedish football clubs such as Malmö FF, Helsingborgs IF and Östers IF.
