= Björn Stigson =

American businessman

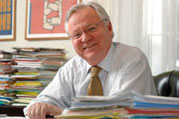
Stigson in 2007

Björn Stigson was until 2012 president of the World Business Council for Sustainable Development (WBCSD), a CEO-led, global association of some 200 companies dealing exclusively with business and sustainable development.

He began his career as financial analyst with the Swedish Kockums Group. From 1971 to 1982 he worked for ESAB, an international supplier of welding equipment, in different positions, being responsible for finance, operations and marketing.

In 1983, he became president and CEO of the Fläkt Group, a company listed on the Stockholm stock exchange and the world leader in environmental control technology.

Following the acquisition of Fläkt by ABB Group, in 1991 he became executive vice president and a member of ABB Asea Brown Boveri's Executive Management Group.

From 1993 to 1994, he ran his own management consultancy.

In 1995, he was appointed president of the WBCSD, a coalition of some 200 leading international corporations.

He now serves on the boards of or on committees advising the Chinese government, the Dow Jones Sustainability Index, Harvard Kennedy School at Harvard University, the Clinton Global Initiative and the Global Reporting Initiative.
