= Bjarne Pettersen (footballer) =

Norwegian footballer (1907-1975)

Personal information
- Date of birth: 16 June 1907
- Date of death: 17 May 1975 (aged 67)

International career
Years	Team	Apps	(Gls)
1931–1933	Norway	7	(0)

Bjarne Pettersen (16 June 1907 – 17 May 1975) was a Norwegian footballer. He played in seven matches for the Norway national football team from 1931 to 1933.
