= Bjørn Grinde =

Norwegian biologist

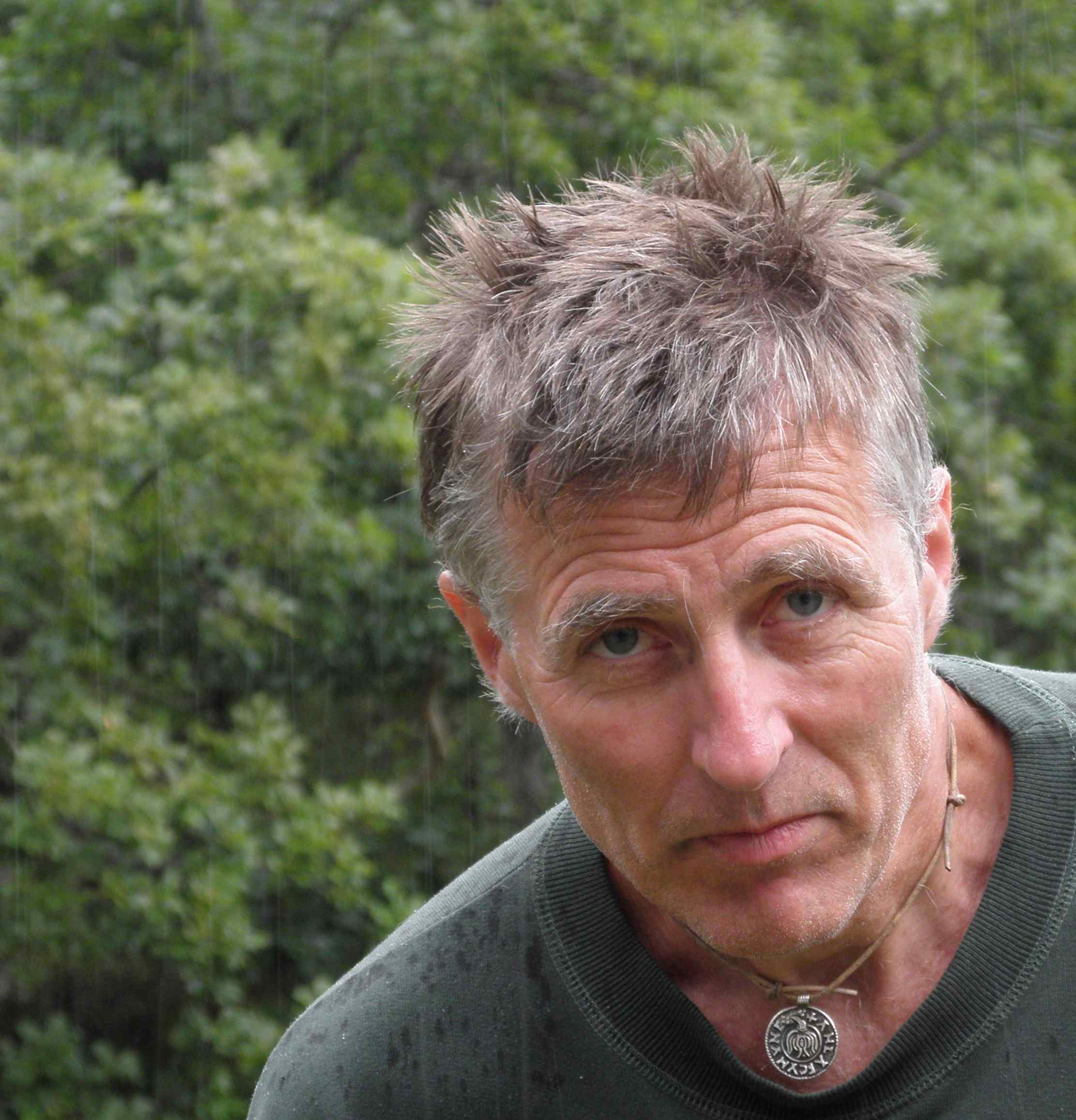
- Born: 3 July 1952 (age 74)
- Education: University of Oslo

Bjørn Grinde is a Norwegian biologist and author working as a scientist in the fields of genetics and evolution, with particular interests in human evolution, behaviour, happiness and consciousness.

== Early life and education ==
He was born and grew up in Oslo, Norway, but spent a year as a high-school exchange student at Michigan, USA, in 1969.

He studied natural sciences as well as psychology, anthropology, and pedagogics at the University of Oslo, resulting in a Dr.scient (1981) and a Dr.philos (1984) in biology from the same university.

== Work roles ==
Grinde has worked as a scientist and professor at leading universities in Norway, USA, and Japan. Before his retirement, he worked as a senior scientist at the Division of Mental and Physical Health, Norwegian Institute of Public Health.

== Areas of interest and research ==
=== Molecular evolution ===
Some of his earlier projects focused on molecular evolution, using viruses as a model system.

=== Human behavioral biology ===
For the later part of his career, the focus has been on understanding how evolution has shaped the human brain with particular reference to what consciousness is and why it serves us positive and negative experiences. The field of science is related to evolutionary psychology. One aim is to find ways to improve mental health and quality of life. The approach is based on the idea that natural selection has shaped the human brain; consequently, our evolutionary history has an impact on feelings and behavior. Our brain evolved to serve hunting and gathering behavior in tribal (Stone Age) groups, it is therefore not optimal for the present way of living. Fortunately, humans have the most adaptive and moldable brain of any species, the aim of society should therefore be to create an environment that makes the most of our inherent qualities nature.

Grinde suggests that happiness is best understood as a question of the net level of positive and negative feelings. Feelings are primarily initiated by the unconscious brain, but can be modified by conscious effort, thus it is possible to improve on happiness by exercising the brain and by seeking an appropriate environment. One strategy as to brain exercise is to use meditative techniques and include words or sentences (by 'self-talk') that activate either the capacity to turn off negative feelings or to turn on positive feelings.

He has published some 170 scientific articles and several books. Some of his work has been translated to Italian, Arabic, and Chinese. He has lectured on this topic around the world.

== Selected books ==
- 2002/2012: Evolution as a Guide for Living and Understanding Human Behavior, Darwin Press (translated to Italian in 2015)
- 2011: God - A Scientific Update, Darwin Press
- 2012: The Biology of Happiness, Springer
- 2015: Alternative Ways of Living: The Human Zoo, Darwin Press
- 2016: The Evolution of Consciousness. Implications for Mental Health and Quality of Life, Springer
- 2023: SEX - The Pleasure and the Pain, Pleasure Press
