= Björn the Eunuch =

Björn the Eunuch (Icelandic: Björn er Geldingur, Swedish: Björn Hovmannen) was a semi-legendary king of Sweden who would have lived some time in the 10th century. Björn the Eunuch is said to have been a ruler of the House of Munsö who reigned briefly before being emasculated by his enemies and exiled to the Duchy of Normandy.

== See also ==
- Early Swedish History
- House of Munsö

== Bibliography ==
- Lagerquist, Lars O. (1997). Sveriges Regenter, från forntid till nutid. Norstedts, Stockholm. ISBN 91-1-963882-5
