= Bjørn Nyland (YouTuber) =

Norwegian YouTuber

- Born: 29 July 1979 (age 47); Chiang Mai, Thailand
- Other name: TeslaBjørn

YouTube information
- Channel: Bjørn Nyland
- Years active: 16
- Subscribers: 354 thousand
- Views: 211 million
- Last updated: 22 August 2026

Bjørn Phamorn Nyland a.k.a. Teslabjørn (born 29 July 1979) is a Norwegian YouTuber posting videos about electric cars in the English language since 2013, and in Thai language since 2017.

== Electric cars YouTuber ==
Formerly a programmer at the University of Oslo and Statistics Norway, Nyland started his YouTube channel in 2010 with a video showing an onboard ride in a Renault Laguna Diesel doing 200 km/h (125 mph) on a German Autobahn. In May 2013, he test drove an electric Tesla Model S, posting his YouTube video in Norwegian language with English subtitles. His own Tesla Model S P85 was delivered in November 2013, and soon he filmed a road trip across Norway in winter weather.

Nyland slowly hypermiled his Model S for 18 hours in 2015 to a "Record-Breaking 452.8 Miles On A Single Charge"

=== 1000 km challenge ===
Nyland has pioneered and repeatedly tested a number of electric cars according to his method called the 1000 km challenge, in which the vehicle must cover 1000 km (621 mi) as quickly as possible; the result is the sum of the time spent driving and the time spent at charging stations.

The tests take place on Norwegian, and sometimes Swedish, roads, which have good DC fast charging infrastructure but generally lower speed limits than German or French highways.

== 24h EV world records in Germany ==
After German YouTuber Horst Lüning and his son have covered 2,424 km within 24 hours in a Model S on Bundesautobahn 8 near Ulm to the west of Munich in June 2016, Lüning in 2018 joined an Austrian G-Electric team that used a US-import Tesla Model 3 with a special charging port adaptor to improve the record to 2,644 km.

In July 2019, after Tesla finally delivered European-spec Model 3 with CCS connector, Nyland was part of a team that set the new record at 2,781 km (1,728 mi) in 24 hours in a Tesla Model 3 Long Range AWD. The team set this record using the IONITY 350 kW quick chargers Demminer Land at Bundesautobahn 20 to the north of Berlin because currently, that network is significantly faster than Tesla's Superchargers (v2).

== Winner of four Teslas ==
In October 2015 Nyland won a Founders Series Tesla Model X after ten Tesla customers used his referral code which he named "Optimus Prime". He used his Model X to create his most popular videos, "Tesla Model X doors crushing things", "Tesla Model X vs Hummer H2 tug of war", "Tesla Model X off-roading gone wrong!". By the end of 2015, he won the second European referral contest, and a free Tesla Model S P90D Ludicrous (which was delivered as a P100DL and sold to pay for the taxes for his Model X). By 2019, he won two second generation Tesla Roadsters,, bringing the total to 4.

== Personal life ==
Nyland was born in Chiang Mai, Thailand to a Thai mother and Chinese father. on 29 July 1979. He has been living in Norway since the age of 4.

Nyland speaks Norwegian fluently with a native accent, having spent most of his youth in Norway, and Bodø from where he got his regional dialect. He rarely speaks Norwegian in his videos. He also speaks fluent Thai especially Northern Thai language and publish some Thai-language videos in his YouTube subchannel Teslabjorn Thai but he can't read Thai. In his videos he on occasion throws in a few of his favorite German words which he finds funny ("Anhängerkupplung" = trailer hitch), he does not however know much German.

Nyland lives in Jessheim married to a Thai woman, known by nickname Amm or stage name Ammery. They have two kids as of 2022 and 2024, also own a white chihuahua called Dolly they bought in 2017.

In March 2021, he published videos documenting him suffering from COVID-19, which lasted about 16 days.
