= Bjarne Berulfsen =

Norwegian philologist and professor (1906–1970)

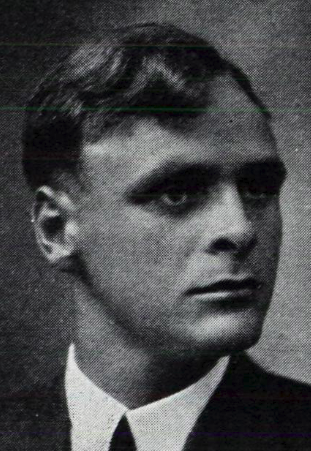
Bjarne Berulfsen

Bjarne Berulfsen (March 27, 1906 – October 9, 1970) was a Norwegian philologist and professor, best known for establishing the Friends of Folk Song Club (Norwegian: Visens venner) in 1946 and for writing many books translated into several languages.

Berulfsen was born in Solum Municipality (now part of Skien Municipality). He passed his university admission exam (examen artium) in 1925 and then received a candidatus philologiæ degree in historical linguistics in 1932. He taught at Christian High School (Norwegian: Kristelig Gymnasium) in Oslo, and then became the principal of the Oslo Commerce School in 1936. He received his PhD in 1949 with the dissertation Kulturtradisjon fra en storhetstid (Cultural Tradition from a Golden Age), which was based on private correspondence from the 15th century, and he was also hosted at the University of Wisconsin–Madison in 1958. He was appointed a lecturer at the University of Oslo in 1960, then a senior lecturer, and finally a professor of Norwegian linguistics in 1967 at the university's Faculty of Humanities, where he worked until his death.

Berulfsen served on the Educational Coordination Committee (Norwegian: Samordningsnemnda for skoleverket) from 1947 onward and later on the Norwegian Language Council (Norwegian: Norsk Språknemnd), initially as its chairman in 1965. He was the father of the journalist Torkjell Berulfsen and also wrote lyrics and performed them while playing piano. Together with others, Berulfsen showed how Norwegian folk tales influenced the Bokmål written standard in separating from the prevailing written language: Danish influenced by Latin and German.

== Selected works ==
- En stilistisk og språklig undersøkelse av brevene fra Håkon Erlingsson, biskop i Bjørgvin bispedømme 1332–1342 (A Stylistic and Linguistic Study of Letters from Håkon Erlingsson, Bishop in the Diocese of Bjørgvin 1332–1342, 1933)
- Engelsk-norsk (English–Norwegian, 1933. Later edition with Hjørdis Scavenius, 1938)
- (with Søren Seland) Rettskrivning i vestelomma: bokmål (Pocket Spelling Guide: Bokmål, 1939)
- (with Didrik Arup Seip) Fremmedord – blå ordbok (Dictionary of Foreign Words, 1940. Later edition with Dag Gundersen)
- "Hvor ligger 'Laagøerne'?" (Where is "Laagøerne"? in Historisk tidsskrift 1943–46 33: 314–327)
- Norske brev- og formularbøker i det 19. hundreår (Norwegian Nineteenth-Century Books of Letters and Forms, 1948)
- Kulturtradisjon fra en storhetstid (Cultural Tradition from a Golden Age, 1948)
- (with Erling Brinchmann and Jacob Brinchmann) Som blomsterstøv med vind: tre av Visens venner synger Einar Skjæraasen (Like Pollen in the Wind: Three by the Friends of Folk Song Club Singer Einar Skjæraasen, 1950)
- "Knut Porses brev til bergenserne" (Knut Pors' Letter to the People of Bergen, in Historisk tidsskrift 1952–53 36: 620–625)
- Et blad av en summa dictaminum (A Page of a summa dictaminis, 1953)
- (with Einar Johannes Lundeby) Aschehougs ordlister (Aschehoug Glossaries). Including Bokmål 1. Fullstendig liste, alle former oppført (Bokmål 1. Complete List, All Forms Included, 1961) and Bokmål 2. Med tradisjonelle ("moderate") former (Bokmål 2. With Traditional ["Moderate"] Forms, 1961)
- (with Alf Erling Knappen) Ordliste for folkeskolen (Primary School Glossary, 1963)
- Norsk grammatikk (Norwegian Grammar, 1963)
- Den gode vise (The Good Song, 1967)
- (with Herbert Svenkerud) Norsk-engelsk ordbok og omvendt (Norwegian–English / English–Norwegian Dictionary, 1968. Later editions with Torkjell Berulfsen and Willy A. Kirkeby)
- Norsk uttaleordbok (Norwegian Pronunciation Dictionary, 1969)
