= Bjarne Westermarck =

Finnish politician (1887–1945)

Bjarne Rudolf Alexander Westermarck (15 January 1887, Helsinki – 18 September 1945) was a Finnish politician. He was a Member of the Parliament of Finland from 1922 to 1923, representing the Agrarian League.
