= Bergdalens IK =

Swedish football club

- Full name: Bergdalens Idrottsklubb
- Ground: Björkängsvallen; Borås; Sweden
- Chairman: Helena Ransjö Alcenius
- League: Division 4 Västergötland Södra
Home colours

Bergdalens IK is a Swedish football club located in Borås.

== Background ==
Bergdalens IK's men's team currently plays in Division 4 Västergötland Södra which is the sixth tier of Swedish football. They play their home matches at the Björkängsvallen in Borås.

The club is affiliated to Västergötlands Fotbollförbund.

On 30 December 2022, the women's team announced its withdrawal from Elitettan for the 2023 season. The vacant position was offered to BK Häcken FF's second team, which on 9 January 2023 accepted the offer.

== Season to season ==
Season	Level	Division	Section	Position	Movements
2006*	Tier 7	Division 5	Västergötland Mellersta	4th	
2007	Tier 7	Division 5	Västergötland Sydvästra	1st	Promoted
2008	Tier 6	Division 4	Västergötland Södra	4th	
2009	Tier 6	Division 4	Västergötland Södra	10th	Relegation Playoffs – Relegated
2010	Tier 7	Division 5	Västergötland Mellersta	1st	Promoted
2011	Tier 6	Division 4	Västergötland Södra		

* League restructuring in 2006 resulted in a new division being created at Tier 3 and subsequent divisions dropping a level.
