= Bjarne Hansen (footballer, born 1929) =

Norwegian footballer (1929–2023)

Personal information
- Date of birth: 27 May 1929
- Place of birth: Oslo, Norway
- Date of death: 16 January 2023 (aged 93)
- Place of death: Oslo, Norway
- Position: Centre-back

Senior career*
Years	Team	Apps	(Gls)
1947–1964	Vålerenga	158	(1)

International career
1953–1958	Norway B	8	(0)
1957–1958	Norway	3	(0)
- * Club domestic league appearances and goals

Bjarne Hansen (27 May 1929 – 16 January 2023) was a Norwegian footballer who played as a centre-back.

Hansen spent his entire club career at Vålerenga, where he played 158 matches in the Norwegian top league between 1948 and 1964, scoring one goal. He was a member of the Vålerenga side that finished second in the 1948–49 season, winning the silver medal: the club's first-ever league medal. At the time of his death, Hansen was the last surviving member of that team. He also played three times for the Norway national team in 1957 and 1958.
