= Bjarne Hansen (footballer, born 1894) =

Norwegian footballer (1894-1915)

Personal information
- Date of birth: 25 September 1894
- Place of birth: Larvik, Norway
- Date of death: 28 July 1915 (aged 20)
- Place of death: Skien, Norway
- Position: Forward

Senior career*
| Years | Team | Apps | (Gls) |
- Larvik Turn

International career
| 1913 | Norway | 1 | (0) |
- * Club domestic league appearances and goals

Bjarne Hansen (25 September 1894 – 28 July 1915) was a Norwegian footballer. He played once for the Norway national football team in 1913.

He played for Larvik Turn for five years. He died at Skien Hospital. At his funeral, members of Larvik Turn were casket-bearers, as well as the club flag being flown.
