= Bjarne Rognlien =

Norwegian judge (1891–1981)

Bjarne Randers Rognlien
- Born: 28 January 1891; Eidanger, Norway
- Died: 9 January 1981 (aged 89)
- Occupation: Judge

Bjarne Rognlien (28 January 1891 – 9 January 1981) was a Norwegian judge.

He was born in Eidanger Municipality to Bernt Martin Rognlien and Anna Randers. He graduated as cand.jur. in 1916. He was appointed as district stipendiary magistrate (sorenskriver) in Salten from 1939, and in Eiker, Modum, and Sigdal from 1947 to 1961. He served as acting Supreme Court Justice from 1948 to 1949.
