= Football at the 1912 Summer Olympics – Men's team squads =

This page lists the football squads, in order with the gold medallists first, of the 11 participating nations at the men's football tournament at the 1912 Summer Olympics. The tournament was contested in and around Stockholm, Sweden, between 29 June and 6 July 1912.

== Great Britain ==
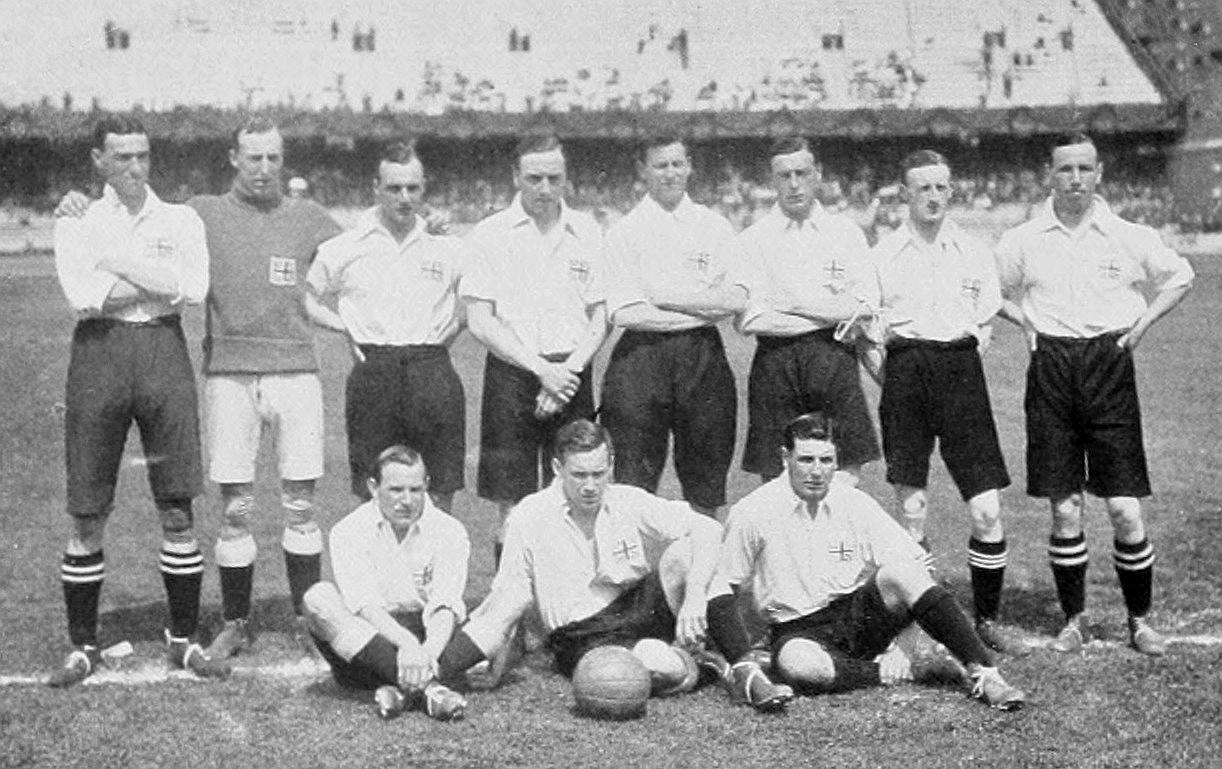
The Olympic gold medalists: United Kingdom

Head coach: Arthur Birch

No.	Pos.	Player	DoB	Age	Caps	Club	Tournament games	Tournament goals
-	GK	Horace Bailey	1881-07-03	31	6+5	(England) Birmingham	0	0
-	FW	Arthur Berry	1888-01-03	24	20+1	(England) Everton	2	1
-	GK	Ronald Brebner	1881-09-23	30	12+0	(England) Leicester Fosse	3	0
-	DF	Thomas Burn	1888-11-29	23	4+0	(England) London Caledonians	3	0
-	FW	Leonard Dawe	1889-11-03	22	1+0	(England) Southampton	0	0
-	MF	Joseph Dines	1886-04-12	26	7+0	(England) Ilford F.C.	3	0
-	MF	Edward Hanney	1889-01-19	23	2+0	(England) Reading	1	0
-	FW	Gordon Hoare	1884-04-18	26	7+0	(England) Glossop North End	3	2
-	DF	Arthur Knight	1887-09-07	24	7+0	(England) Portsmouth F.C.	3	0
-	MF	Henry Littlewort	1882-07-07	29	3+0	(England) Glossop North End	3	0
-	DF	William Martin	1885-03-23	27	5+0	(England) Ilford F.C.	0	0
-	MF	Douglas McWhirter	1886-08-13	25	1+0	(England) Leicester Fosse	1	0
-	FW	Sydney Sanders	1890-06-09	22	2+0	(England) Nunhead F.C.	0	0
-	FW	Ivan Sharpe	1889-06-15	23	2+0	(England) Derby County	3	0
-	MF	Harold Stamper	1889-10-06	22	0+0	(England) Stockton F.C.	1	0
-	FW	Harold Walden	1889-10-10	22	0+0	(England) Bradford City	3	9
-	FW	Vivian Woodward	1879-06-03	33	20+23	(England) Chelsea	3	2
-	FW	Gordon Wright	1884-10-03	27	13+1	(England) Hull City	1	0

== Denmark ==
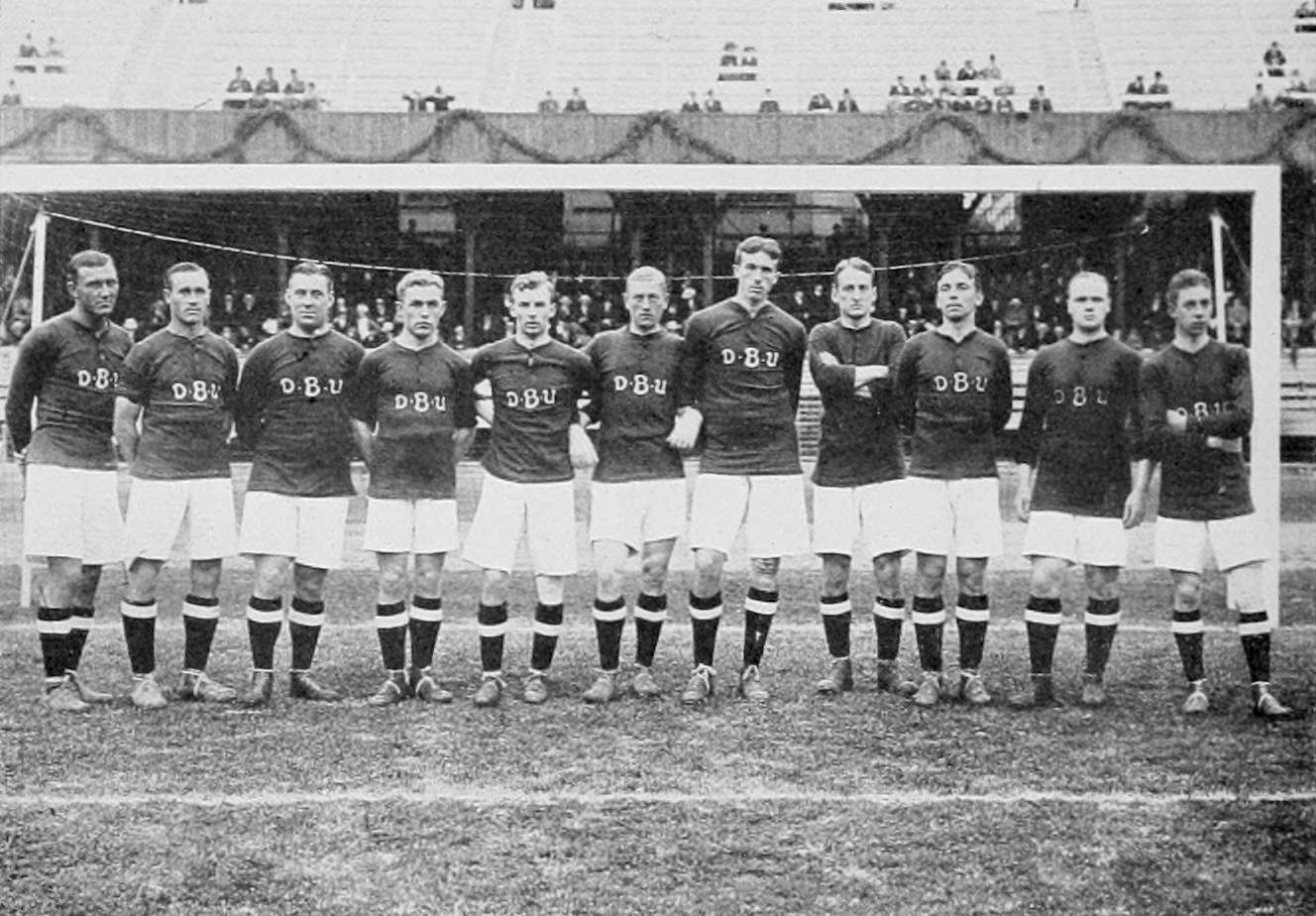
Denmark's team just before the semi-final match against the Netherlands. From left: Olsen, S. Nielsen, H. Hansen, Berth, P. Nielsen, S. Hansen, Middelboe, Buchwald, O. Nielsen, Jørgensen, Wolfhagen

Head coach: Louis Østrup

No.	Pos.	Player	DoB	Age	Caps	Club	Tournament games	Tournament goals
-	MF	Paul Berth	1890-04-07	22	1	(Denmark) AB	3	0
-	DF	Charles Buchwald	1880-10-22	31	4	(Denmark) AB	3	0
-	DF	Svend Aage Castella	1890-03-15	22	1	(Denmark) KB	0	0
-	FW	Hjalmar Christoffersen	1889-12-01	22	0	(Denmark) Frem	1	0
-	GK	Ludvig Drescher	1881-07-21	30	4	(Denmark) KB	0	0
-	MF	Axel Dyrberg	1889-11-09	22	0	(Denmark) B 1903	0	0
-	DF	Harald Hansen	1884-03-14	28	4	(Denmark) B93	3	0
-	GK	Sophus Hansen	1889-11-16	22	1	(Denmark) Frem	3	0
-	MF	Emil Jørgensen	1882-02-07	30	1	(Denmark) B93	2	1
-	MF	Ivar Lykke	1889-03-07	23	1	(Denmark) KB	1	0
-	MF	Viggo Malmqvist	1892-05-01	20	0	(Denmark) B93	0	0
-	MF/DF	Nils Middelboe	1887-10-05	24	5	(Denmark) KB	3	1
-	MF	Christian Morville	1891-12-03	20	0	(Denmark) KB	0	0
-	FW	Oskar Nielsen	1882-10-04	29	3	(Denmark) KB	2	0
-	FW	Poul Nielsen	1891-12-25	20	2	(Denmark) KB	1	0
-	FW	Sophus Nielsen	1888-03-15	24	5	(Denmark) Frem	3	2
-	FW	Anthon Olsen	1889-09-14	22	0	(Denmark) B93	3	7
-	FW	Axel Petersen	1887-12-10	24	1	(Denmark) Frem	1	0
-	FW	Axel Thufason	1889-11-11	22	1	(Denmark) B93	1	0
-	FW	Vilhelm Wolfhagen	1889-11-11	22	4	(Denmark) KB	3	1

== Netherlands ==
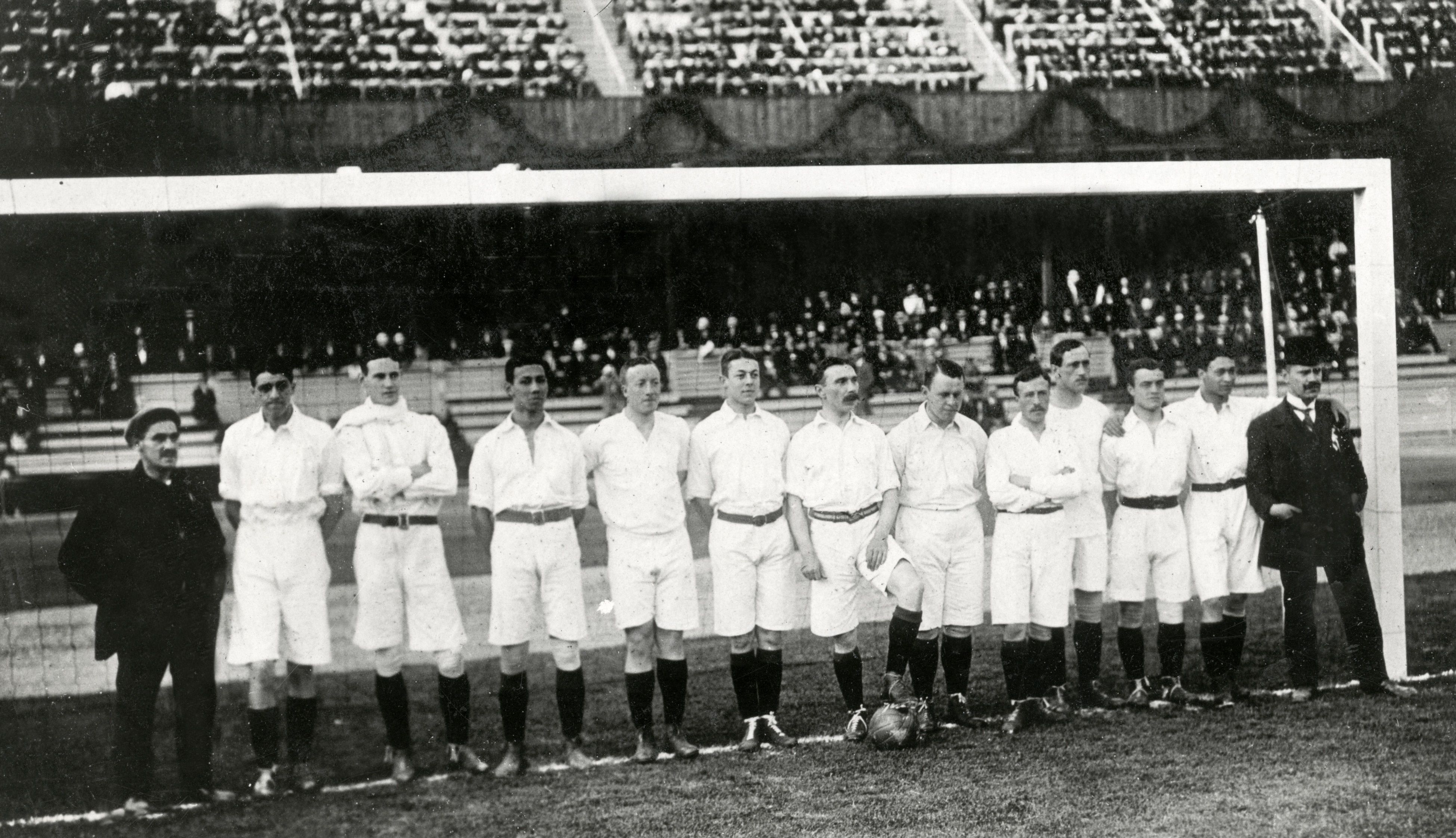
The team of the Netherlands – bronze medal winners

Head coach: (England) Edgar Chadwick

No.	Pos.	Player	DoB	Age	Caps	Club	Tournament games	Tournament goals
-	DF	Piet Bouman	1892-10-14	19	0	(Netherlands) FC Dordrecht	2	0
-	MF	Joop Boutmy	1894-04-29	18	0	(Netherlands) HBS Craeyenhout	3	0
-	FW	Nico Bouvy	1892-07-11	19	1	(Netherlands) FC Dordrecht	4	3
-	FW	Huug de Groot	1890-05-07	22	1	(Netherlands) Sparta Rotterdam	4	2
-	MF	Bok de Korver	1883-01-27	29	25	(Netherlands) Sparta Rotterdam	1	0
-	MF	Nico de Wolf	1887-10-27	24	2	(Netherlands) HFC Haarlem	2	0
-	GK	Wilhelmus Martinus van Eeck	1893-03-13	19	0	(Netherlands) GVC Wageningen	0	0
-	DF	Constant Feith	1884-08-03	27	6	(Netherlands) HVV Den Haag	2	0
-	MF	Ge Fortgens	1887-07-10	24	6	(Netherlands) AFC Ajax	2	0
-	GK	Just Göbel	1891-11-21	20	7	(Netherlands) Vitesse Arnhem	4	0
-	FW	Felix von Heijden	1890-04-11	22	0	(Netherlands) Quick Nijmegen	0	0
-	FW	Martien Houtkooper	1891-10-27	20	0	(Netherlands) HFC Haarlem	0	0
-	MF	Dirk Lotsy	1882-07-03	29	2	(Netherlands) FC Dordrecht	4	0
-	FW	Caesar ten Cate	1890-08-20	21	0	(Netherlands) HFC Haarlem	3	1
-	MF	Dolf van der Nagel	1889-05-28	23	0	(Netherlands) HFC Haarlem	0	0
-	FW	Jan van Breda Kolff	1894-01-18	18	5	(Netherlands) HVV Den Haag	4	0
-	FW	Jan van der Sluis	1889-04-29	23	0	(Netherlands) VOC Rotterdam	1	2
-	FW	Jan Vos	1888-04-17	24	2	(Netherlands) UVV Utrecht	4	8
-	DF	David Wijnveldt	1891-12-15	20	0	(Netherlands) UD Deventer	4	0

Note: Goalkeeper Wiet Ledeboer was injured on 15 Jun and was replaced by Van Eeck. Source: http://kranten.kb.nl, http://leiden.courant.nu/.

== Finland ==
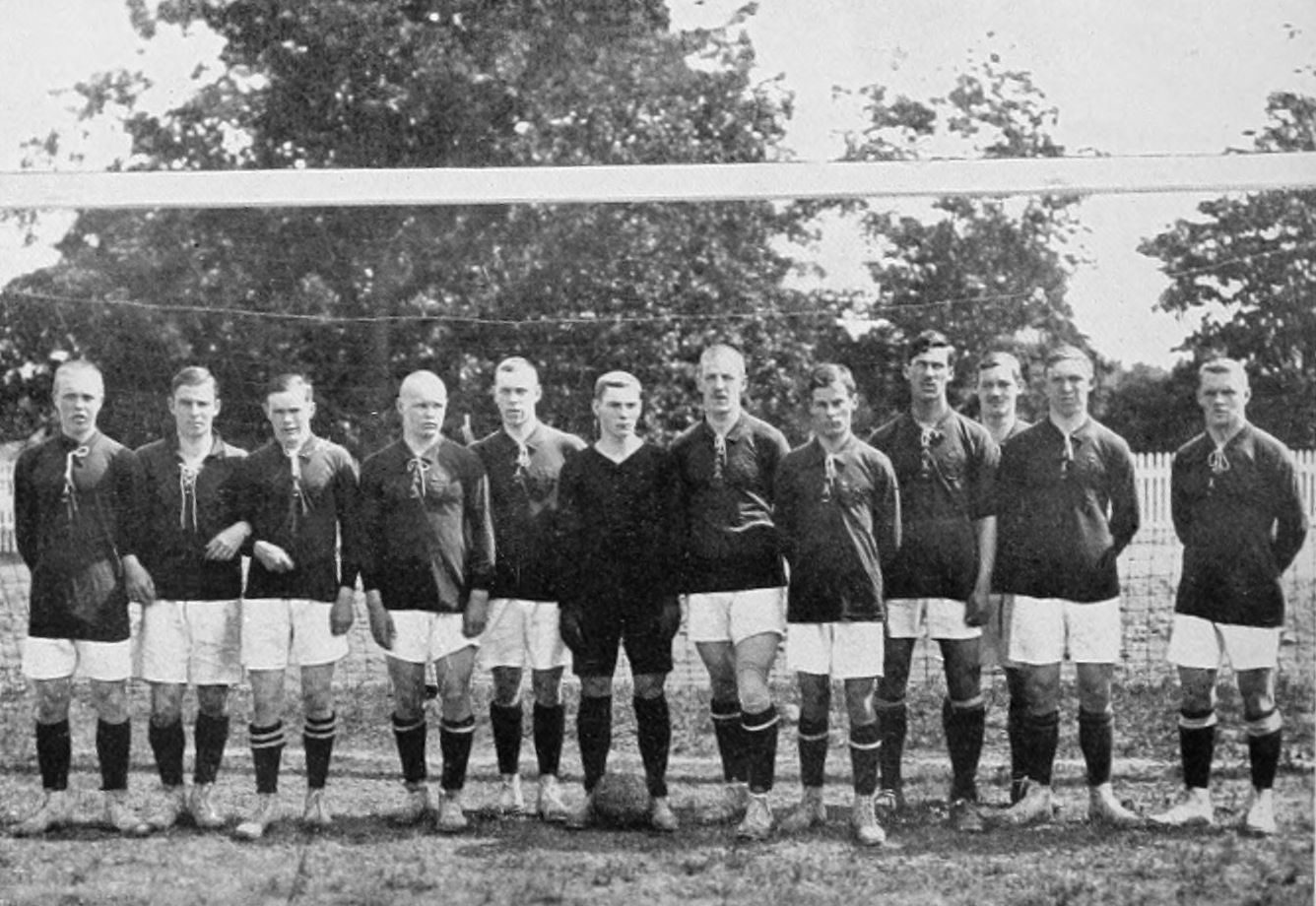
Finland's team

Head coach: none

No.	Pos.	Player	DoB	Age	Caps	Club	Tournament games	Tournament goals
-	GK	Gustaf Holmström	1888-11-27	23	1	(Finland) IF Kamraterna Helsingfors	0	0
-	DF	Jalmari Holopainen	1882-06-29	30	2	(Finland) HJK	4	0
-	MF	Viljo Lietola	1888-10-25	23	2	(Finland) HJK	3	0
-	DF	Gösta Bernhard Löfgren	1891-09-10	20	2	(Finland) IF Kamraterna Helsingfors	4	0
-	MF	Knut Lund	1891-07-17	20	0	(Finland) IF Kamraterna Helsingfors	4	0
-	FW	Algoth Niska	1888-12-05	23	2	(Finland) IF Kamraterna Helsingfors	4	0
-	FW	Artturi Nyyssönen	1892-05-01	20	1	(Finland) HJK	4	0
-	FW	Jarl Öhman	1891-11-14	20	2	(Finland) IF Kamraterna Helsingfors	4	2
-	FW	Lars Schybergson	1894-12-17	17	0	(Finland) Kronohagens IF Helsingfors	0	0
-	MF	Eino Soinio	1894-11-12	17	1	(Finland) HJK	4	1
-	MF	Kaarlo Soinio	1888-01-28	24	2	(Finland) HJK	1	0
-	GK	August Syrjäläinen	1891-04-24	21	1	(Finland) Viipurin Reipas	4	0
-	FW	Lauri Tanner	1890-11-20	21	1	(Finland) HJK	1	0
-	FW	Bror Wiberg	1890-06-14	22	1	(Finland) IF Kamraterna Helsingfors	4	2
-	FW	Ragnar Wickström	1892-11-12	19	1	(Finland) Kronohagens IF Helsingfors	3	0

== Hungary ==
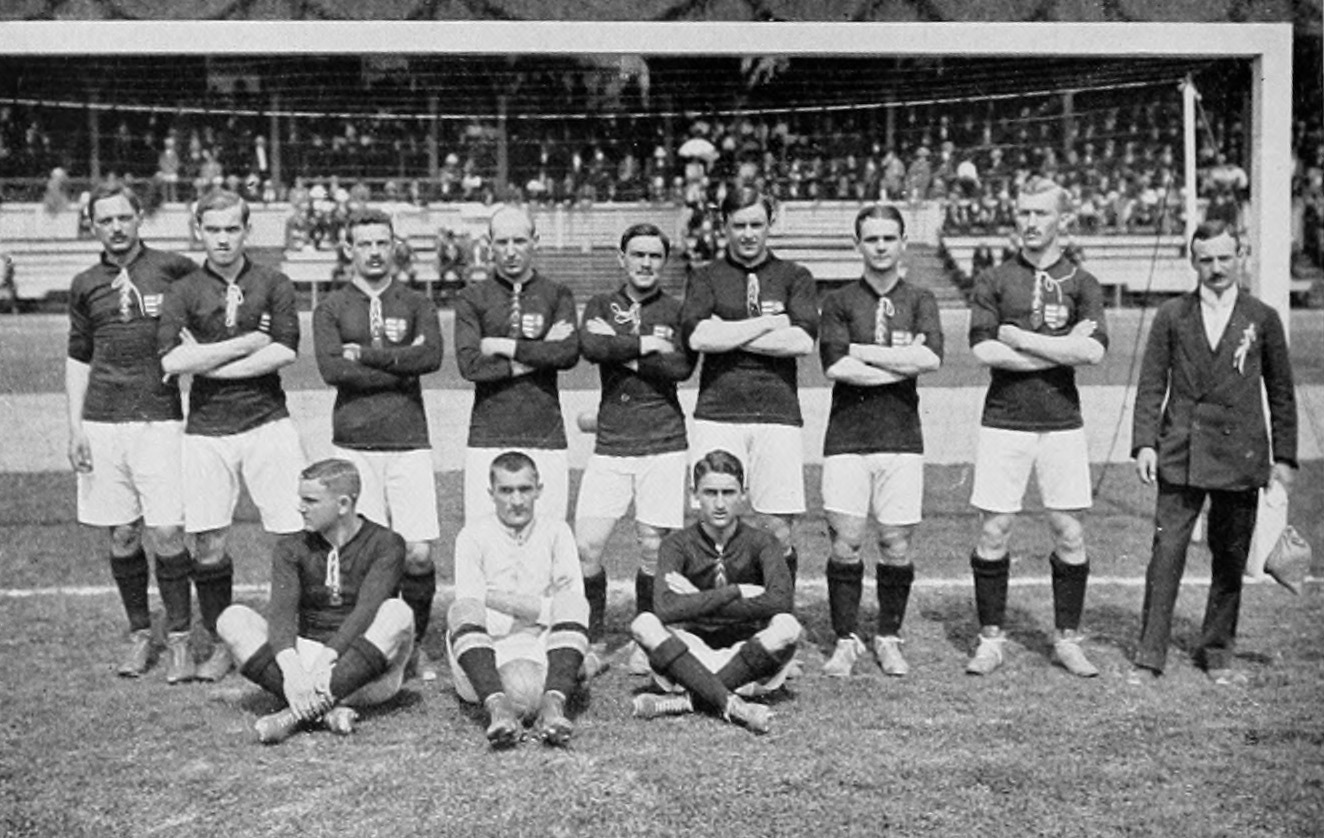
Hungary's team

Head coach: (Hungary) Ede Herczog

No.	Pos.	Player	DoB	Age	Caps	Club	Tournament games	Tournament goals
-	MF	Gyula Bíró	1890-05-10	22	20	(Hungary) MTK Budapest	1+1	0
-	MF	Zoltán Blum	1892-01-03	20	1	(Hungary) Ferencvárosi TC	0+2	0
-	FW	Sándor Bodnár	1890-06-16	21	9	(Hungary) Magyar Athlétikai Club Budapest	1+2	0+1
-	FW	Gáspár Borbás	1884-07-26	27	27	(Hungary) Ferencvárosi TC	1+2	0
-	DF	Sándor Bródy	1884-08-12	27	15	(Hungary) Ferencvárosi TC	0	0
-	GK	László Domonkos	1887-10-10	24	18	(Hungary) MTK Budapest	1+2	0
-	FW	Miklós Fekete	1892-02-10	20	0	(Hungary) Terézvárosi TC Budapest	0+1	0
-	MF	Jenő Károly	1886-01-15	26	21	(Hungary) Budapesti Athlétikai Club	1+0	0
-	FW	Vilmos Kertész	1890-03-21	22	4	(Hungary) MTK Budapest	0	0
-	FW	Mihály Pataki	1893-12-07	18	1	(Hungary) Ferencvárosi TC	1+1	0+1
-	DF	Imre Payer	1888-06-01	24	5	(Hungary) Ferencvárosi TC	1+2	0
-	DF	Béla Révész	1887-02-06	25	6	(Hungary) MTK Budapest	0	0
-	DF	Gyula Rumbold	1887-12-06	24	21	(Hungary) Ferencvárosi TC	1+2	0
-	FW	Béla Sebestyén	1885-01-23	27	18	(Hungary) MTK Budapest	1+2	0
-	FW	Imre Schlosser	1889-10-11	22	29	(Hungary) Ferencvárosi TC	1+2	0+4
-	MF	Kálmán Szury	1890-02-04	22	1	(Hungary) Budapesti Athlétikai Club	0+1	0
-	FW	István Tóth	1891-07-28	20	2	(Hungary) Nemzeti Sport Club	0	0
-	MF	Antal Vágó	1891-09-08	20	6	(Hungary) MTK Budapest	1+2	0
-	GK	Károly Zsák	1895-08-30	16	0	(Hungary) 33 FC Budapest	0	0

The following players were also named as reserves, but did not play in any matches: György Hlavay, Károly Kóródy

== Austria ==
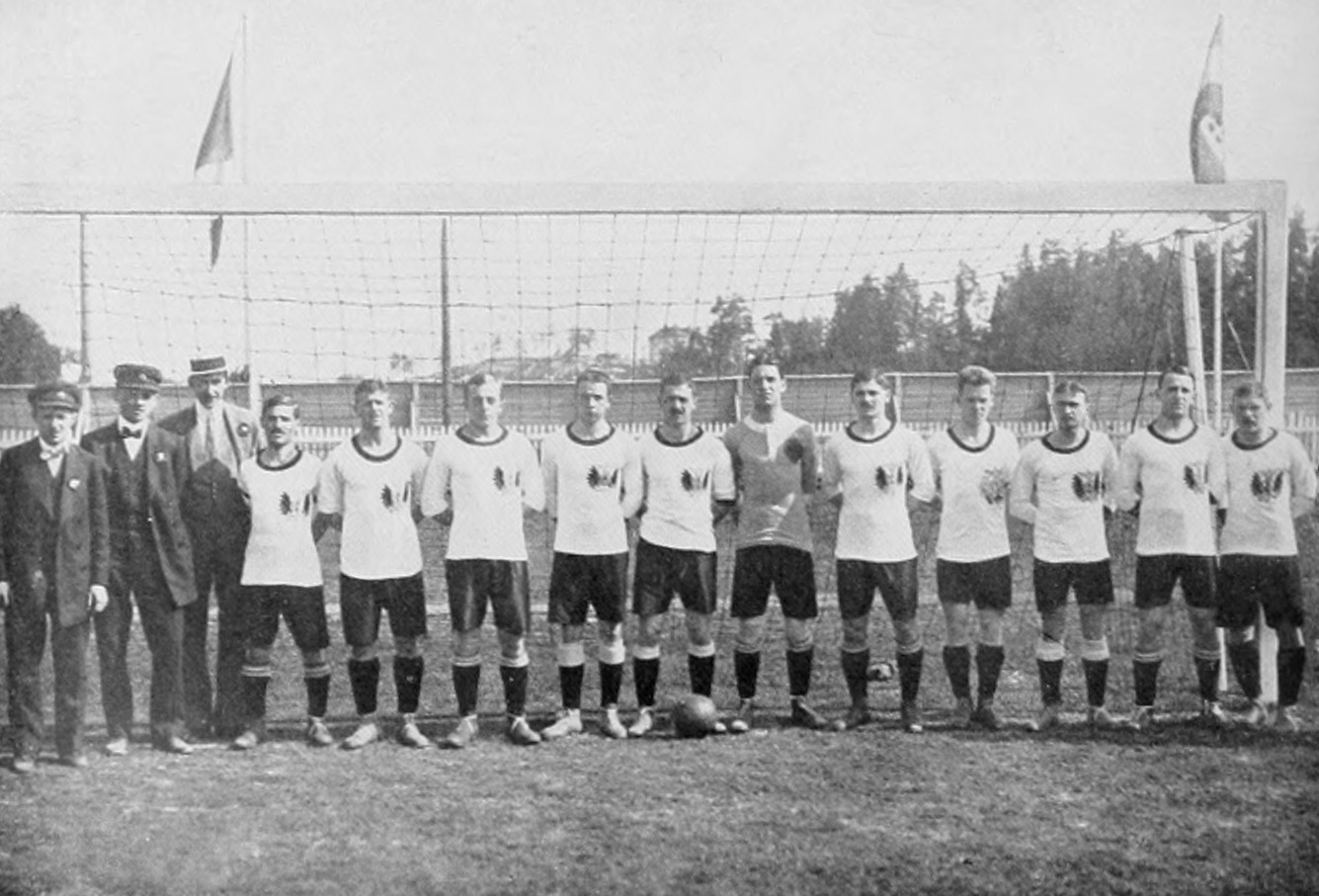
Austria's eleven

Head coach: none ÖFB committee

No.	Pos.	Player	DoB	Age	Caps	Club	Tournament games	Tournament goals
-	FW	Gustav Blaha	1888-01-01	24	0	SK Rapid Wien	0+1	0
-	MF	Josef Brandstätter	1891-11-07	20	0	SK Rapid Wien	2+3	0
-	MF/DF	Karl Braunsteiner	1891-10-27	20	1	Wiener Sportclub	2+3	0
-	MF	Robert Cimera	1887-09-17	24	2	DFC Prag	2+3	1+0
-	DF	Bernhard Graubart	1888-12-22	23	1	DFC Prag	2+2	0
-	FW	Leopold Grundwald	1891-10-28	20	0	SK Rapid Wien	0+3	0+3
-	FW	Ludwig Hussak	1883-07-31	28	10	Wiener Amateure	2+2	0+1
-	GK	Josef Kaltenbrunner	1888-01-22	24	6	SK Rapid Wien	0+3	0
-	DF	Ladislaus Kurpiel	1883-11-13	28	4	DFC Prag	2+2	0
-	FW	Robert Merz	1887-11-25	24	5	DFC Prag	2+2	2+0
-	FW	Alois Müller	1890-06-07	22	0	Wiener Sportclub	2+3	1+1
-	FW	Leopold Neubauer	1889-10-15	22	6	Wiener Sportclub	2+3	1+0
-	GK	Otto Noll	1882-07-24	29	1	DFC Prag	2+0	0
-	FW	Johann Studnicka	1883-10-12	28	9	Wiener AC	2+1	1+1
-	MF	Franz Weber	1888-07-03	23	3	Vienna	0+2	0

The following players were also named as reserves, but did not play in any matches: Hans Andres, Adolf Fischera, Richard Kohn, Heinrich Retschury, Jakob Swatosch, Felix Tekusch, Karl Tekusch

== Germany ==
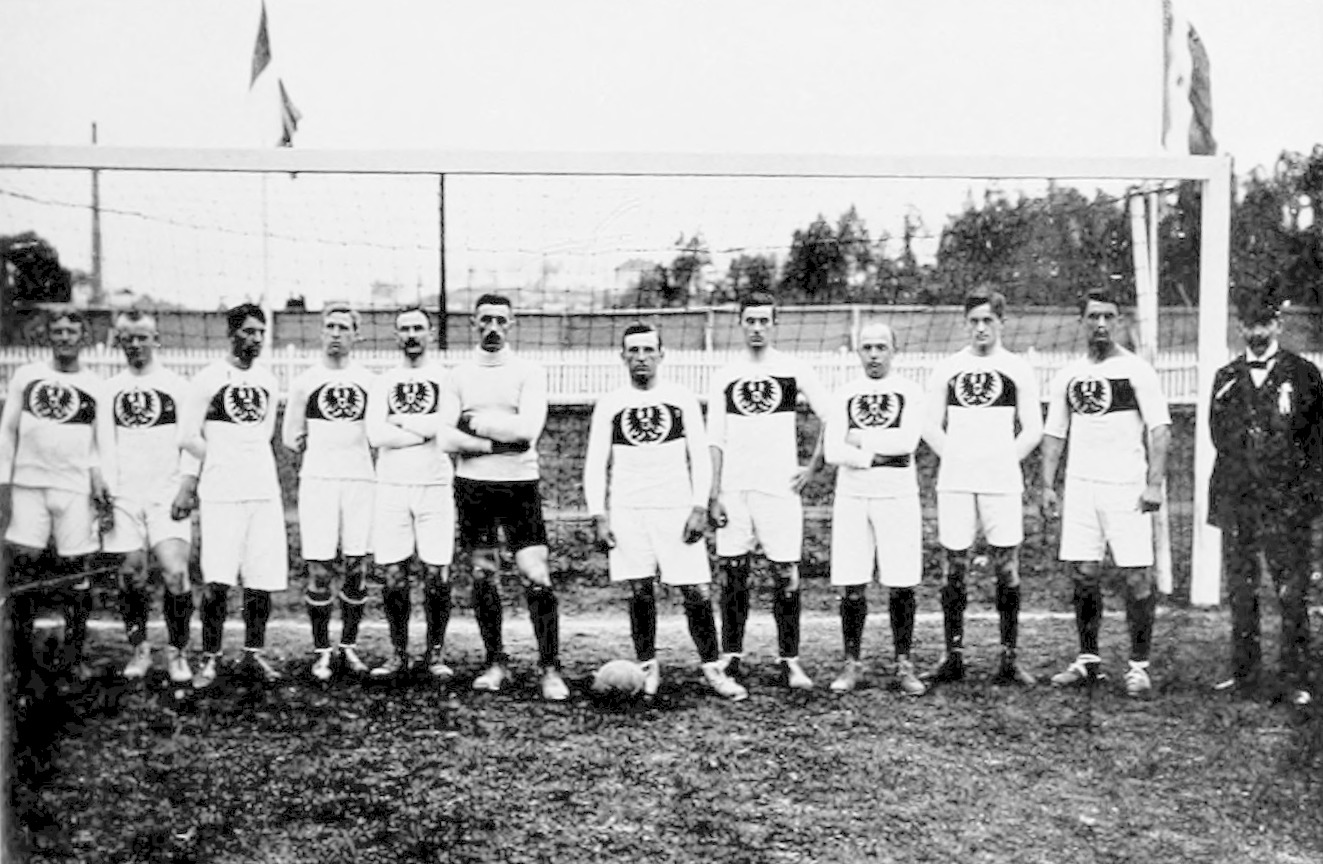
The German team: Third from the left Gottfried Fuchs.

Head coach: none DFB committee

No.	Pos.	Player	DoB	Age	Caps	Club	Tournament games	Tournament goals
-	MF	Hermann Bosch	1891-03-10	21	0	Karlsruher FV	1+1	0
-	MF	Max Breunig	1888-11-12	23	5	Karlsruher FV	1+0	0
-	MF	Karl Burger	1883-12-12	28	10	SpVgg Fürth	0+1	0+1
-	FW	Fritz Förderer	1888-01-05	24	7	Karlsruher FV	0+2	0+5
-	FW	Gottfried Fuchs	1889-05-03	23	3	Karlsruher FV	0+2	0+10
-	MF	Josef Glaser	1887-05-11	25	4	Freiburger FC	0+1	0
-	DF	Walter Hempel	1887-08-12	24	10	FC Sportfreunde 1900 Leipzig	0+1	0
-	FW	Julius Hirsch	1892-04-07	20	2	Karlsruher FV	1+1	0
-	DF	Ernst Hollstein	1886-12-09	25	4	Karlsruher FV	1+1	0
-	FW	Adolf Jäger	1889-03-31	23	4	Altonaer FC Hamburg	1+0	1+0
-	FW	Eugen Kipp	1885-02-26	27	11	Stuttgarter Sportfreunde 1896	1+0	0
-	MF	Georg Krogmann	1886-09-04	25	1	Holstein Kiel	1+1	0
-	FW	Emil Oberle	1889-11-16	22	3	Karlsruher FC Phönix 1894	0+2	0+1
-	DF	Hans Reese	1891-09-17	20	0	Holstein Kiel	0+1	0
-	DF	Helmut Röpnack	1884-09-23	27	4	BTuFC Viktoria 89	1+1	0
-	FW	Otto Thiel	1891-11-23	20	1	BFC Preussen	0+1	0
-	MF	Camillo Ugi	1884-12-21	27	11	Vereinigte Breslauer Sportfreunde	0+2	0
-	FW	Karl Uhle	1887-07-06	24	0	VfB Leipzig	0+1	0
-	GK	Albert Weber	1888-11-21	23	1	Berliner FC Vorwärts 1890	1+0	0
-	FW	Karl Wegele	1887-09-27	24	6	Karlsruher FC Phönix 1894	1+1	0
-	GK	Adolf Werner	1886-10-19	25	11	SC Victoria Hamburg	0+2	0
-	FW	Willi Worpitzky	1886-08-25	25	7	BTuFC Viktoria 89	1+0	0

== Italy ==
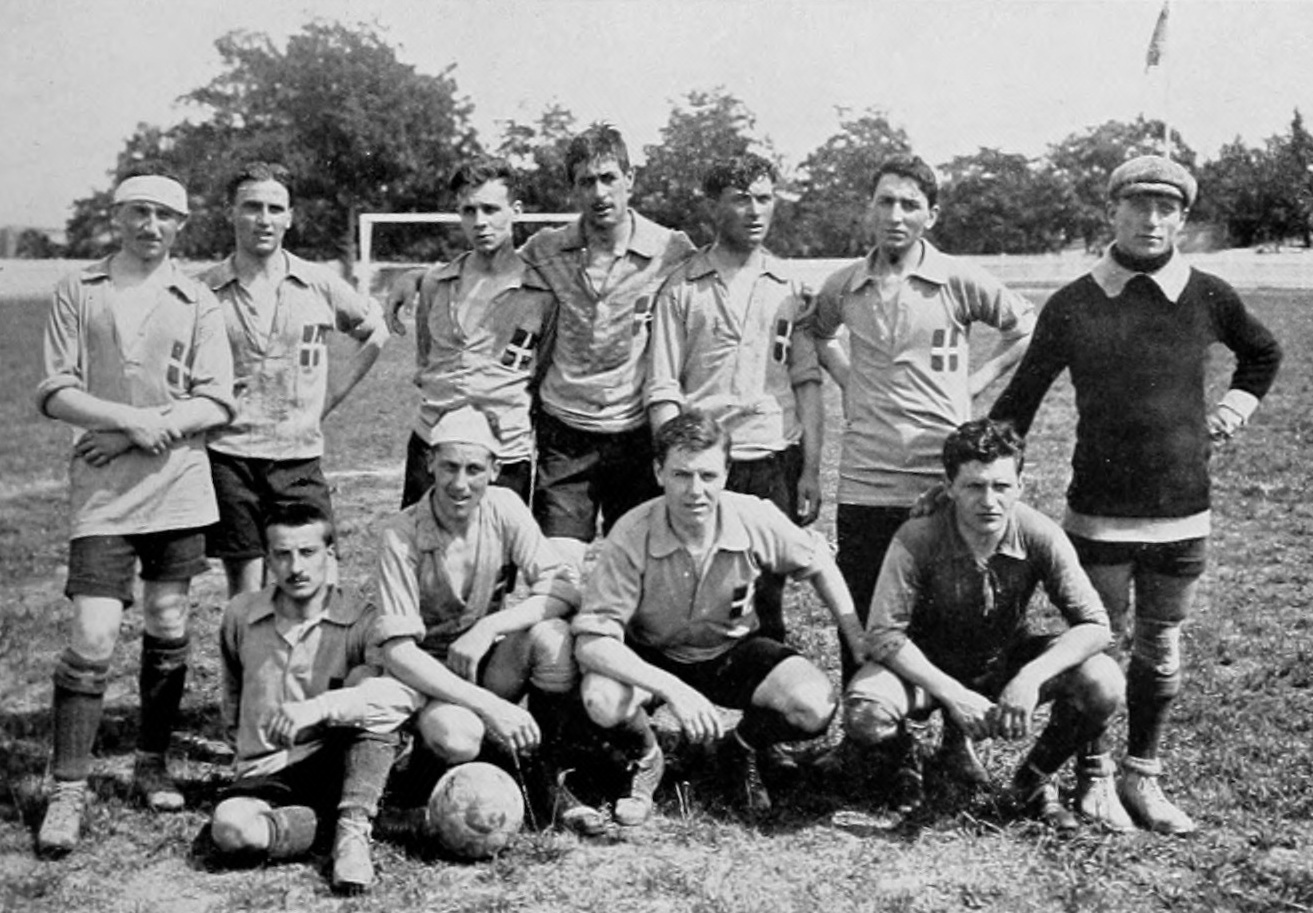
The team of Italy

Head coach: (Italy) Vittorio Pozzo

No.	Pos.	Player	DoB	Age	Caps	Club	Tournament games	Tournament goals
-	FW	Luigi Barbesino	1894-05-01	18	0	(Italy) Casale F.C.	0+2	0
-	FW	Felice Berardo	1888-07-06	23	4	(Italy) U.S. Pro Vercelli	1+2	0+1
-	DF/MF	Angelo Binaschi	1889-01-15	23	4	(Italy) U.S. Pro Vercelli	1+2	0
-	FW	Franco Bontadini	1893-01-07	19	0	(Italy) F.C. Internazionale	1+2	1+1
-	GK	Piero Campelli	1893-12-20	18	0	(Italy) F.C. Internazionale	1+2	0
-	MF	Carlo De Marchi	1890-03-25	22	0	(Italy) Torino F.C.	1+0	0
-	DF	Renzo De Vecchi	1894-02-03	18	6	(Italy) Milan C.F.C.	1+2	0
-	MF	Pietro Leone	1888-01-13	24	2	(Italy) U.S. Pro Vercelli	1+2	0
-	FW	Edoardo Mariani	1893-03-05	19	1	(Italy) Genoa C.F.C.	1+2	0
-	MF	Giuseppe Milano	1887-09-26	24	5	(Italy) U.S. Pro Vercelli	1+2	0
-	MF	Vittorio Morelli di Popolo	1888-05-11	24	0	(Italy) Torino F.C.	1+0	0
-	FW	Enrico Sardi	1891-04-01	21	0	(Italy) S.G. Andrea Doria	1+1	1+0
-	DF	Modesto Valle	1893-03-15	19	0	(Italy) U.S. Pro Vercelli	0+2	0
-	FW	Enea Zuffi	1889-12-27	22	0	(Italy) Torino F.C.	1+1	0

== Sweden ==
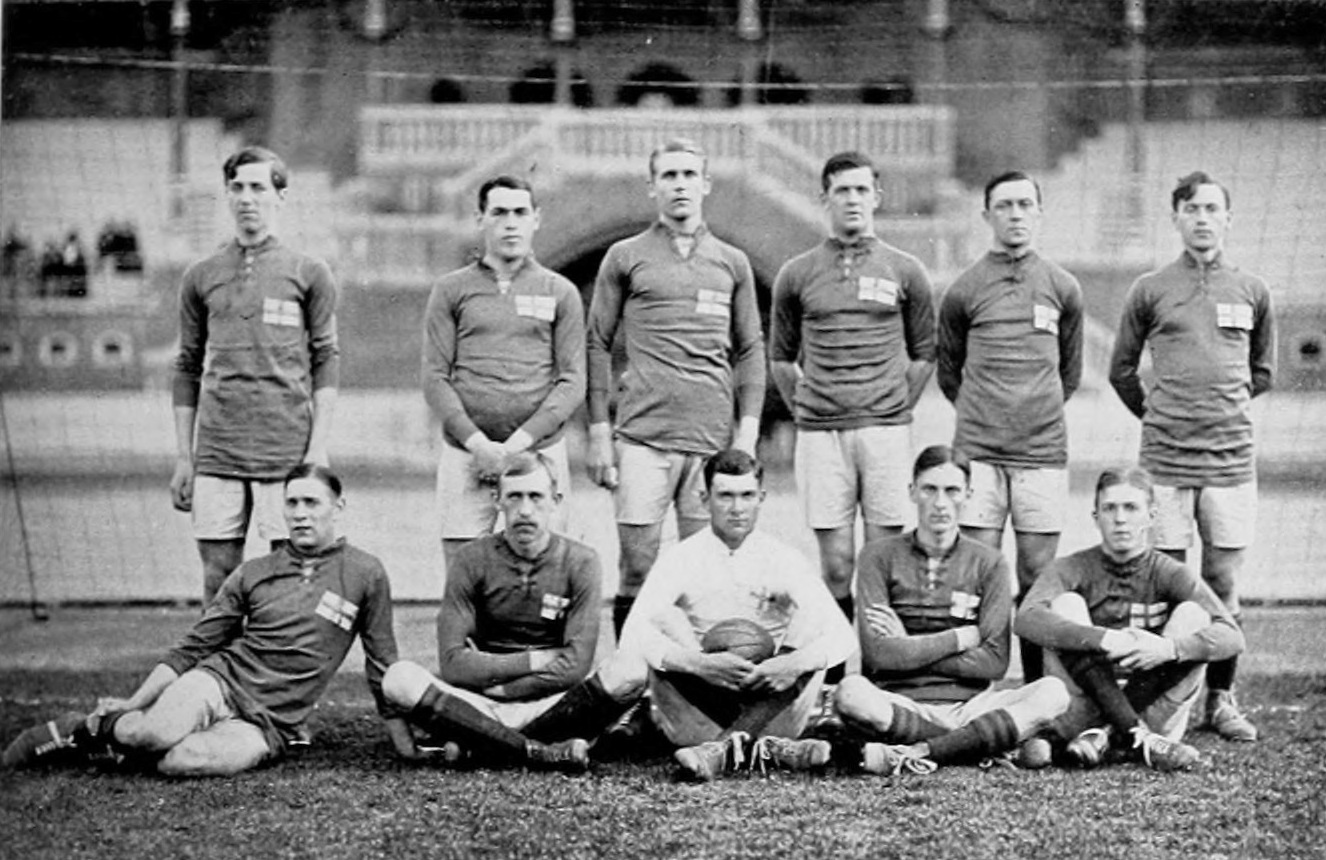
The Swedish eleven just before the match against the Netherlands. Standing from left: Wicksell, Levin, K. Gustafsson, Sandberg, Bergström, Swensson, stitting from left: Ansén, E. Börjesson, J. Börjesson, Ekroth, Myhrberg

Head coach: John Ohlson

No.	Pos.	Player	DoB	Age	Caps	Club	Tournament games	Tournament goals
-	FW	Karl Ansén	1887-07-26	24	10	(Sweden) AIK	1+1	0
-	GK	Oskar Bengtsson	1885-01-14	27	7	(Sweden) Örgryte IS	0	0
-	DF	Erik Bergström	1886-01-06	26	4	(Sweden) Örgryte IS	1+1	0
-	FW	Erik Börjesson	1888-12-01	23	5	(Sweden) Örgryte IS	1+1	1+0
-	GK	Josef Börjesson	1891-04-15	21	2	(Sweden) Göteborgs FF	1+1	0
-	FW	Eric Dahlström	1894-06-26	18	1	(Sweden) IFK Eskilstuna	0+1	0
-	FW	Helge Ekroth	1892-02-26	24	3	(Sweden) AIK	1+0	0
-	MF	Götrik Frykman	1891-12-01	20	2	(Sweden) Djurgårdens IF	0+1	0
-	MF	Karl Gustafsson	1888-09-16	23	10	(Sweden) Köpings IS	1+1	0
-	MF	Oscar Gustafsson	1889-09-25	22	1	(Sweden) Johanneshofs IF	0	0
-	FW	Einar Halling-Johansson	1893-10-14	18	2	(Sweden) Örgryte IS	0	0
-	DF	Jacob Levin	1890-11-22	21	4	(Sweden) Örgryte IS	1+0	0
-	DF	Theodor Malm	1889-10-23	22	8	(Sweden) AIK	0	0
-	FW	Herman Myhrberg	1889-12-29	22	6	(Sweden) Örgryte IS	1+1	0
-	MF	Knut Nilsson	1887-03-22	25	2	(Sweden) AIK	0	0
-	MF	Gustav Sandberg	1888-02-29	24	2	(Sweden) Örgryte IS	1+0	0
-	DF	Henning Svensson	1891-10-19	20	1	(Sweden) IFK Göteborg	0	0
-	FW	Iwar Swensson	1893-11-07	18	1	(Sweden) IFK Norrköping	1+1	2+0
-	DF	Konrad Törnqvist	1888-07-17	23	3	(Sweden) IFK Göteborg	0+1	0
-	MF	Ragnar Wicksell	1892-09-26	19	4	(Sweden) Djurgårdens IF	1+1	0

== Norway ==
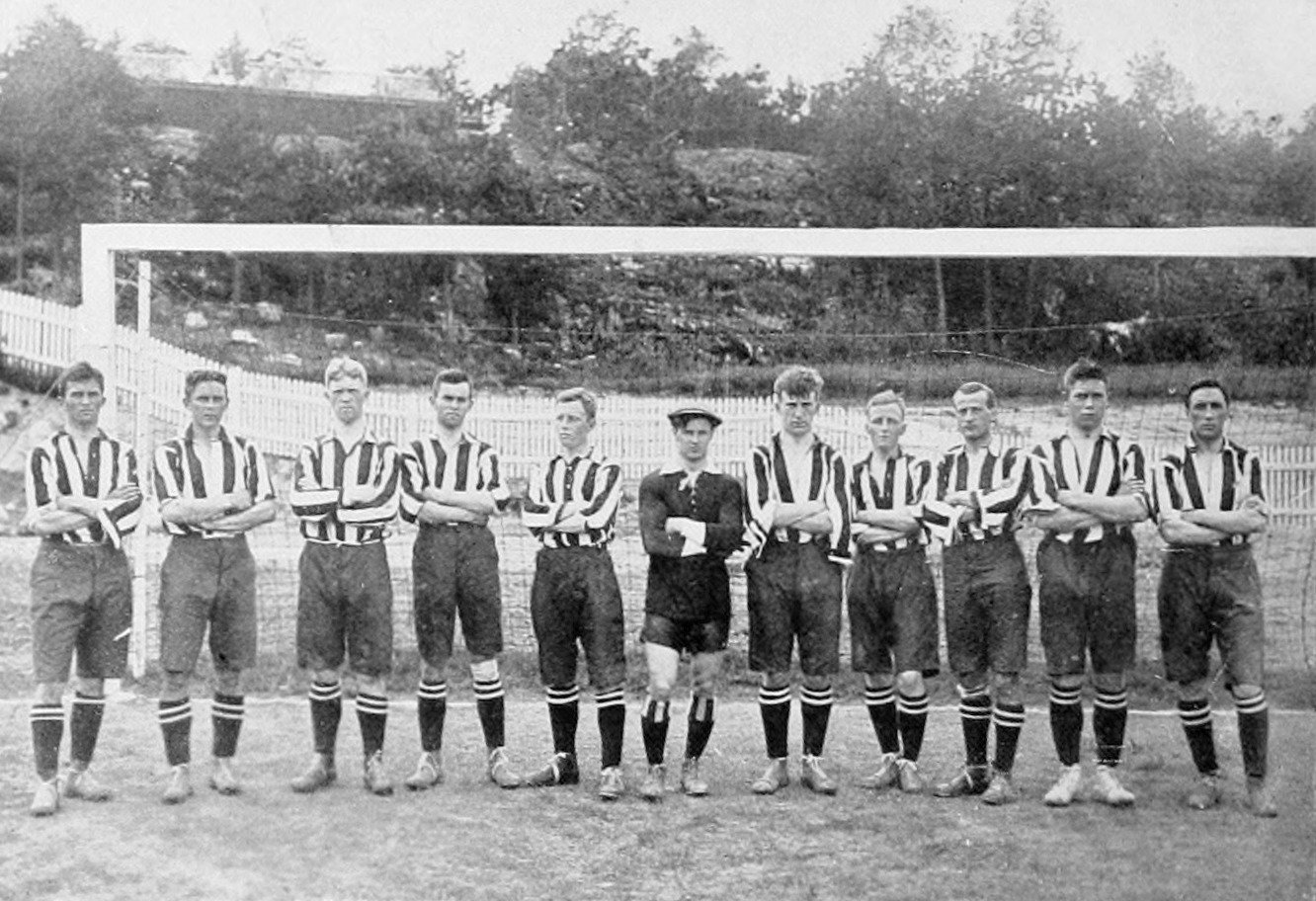
Norwegian football team

Head coach: (England) James Vincent Hayes

No.	Pos.	Player	DoB	Age	Caps	Club	Tournament games	Tournament goals
-	DF	Mathias Widerøe-Aas	1886-12-12	25	2	(Norway) Mercantile	0	0
-	FW	Rolf Aas	1891-10-12	20	1	(Norway) Mercantile	0	0
-	MF	Gunnar Andersen	1890-03-18	22	2	(Norway) Lyn Kristiania	1+0	0
-	DF	Einar Friis Baastad	1890-05-08	22	3	(Norway) Mercantile	1+1	0
-	FW	Sigurd Brekke	1890-10-15	21	1	(Norway) Mercantile	0	0
-	GK	Julius Clementz	1890-05-24	22	2	(Norway) Mercantile	0	0
-	DF	Paul Due	1889-05-19	23	1	(Norway) Lyn Kristiania	0	0
-	FW	Hans Endrerud	1885-10-13	26	4	(Norway) Mercantile	1+1	0
-	FW	Kaare Engebretsen	1893-08-22	18	0	(Norway) Mercantile	0	0
-	MF	Thoralf Grubbe	1891-07-20	20	1	(Norway) Odds Ballklubb Skien	0	0
-	FW	Per Haraldsen	1892-12-05	19	1	(Norway) Odds Ballklubb Skien	0	0
-	MF	Charles Herlofson	1891-06-15	21	4	(Norway) Mercantile	1+1	0
-	MF	Sverre Jensen	1893-01-22	19	0	(Norway) SK Ready Kristiania	0+1	0
-	MF	Harald Johansen	1887-10-09	24	5	(Norway) Mercantile	1+1	0
-	FW	Kristian Krefting	1891-02-09	21	3	(Norway) Lyn Kristiania	1+1	0
-	MF	Marius Lund	1888-02-01	24	0	(Norway) Odds Ballklubb Skien	0	0
-	FW	Erling Maartmann	1887-11-03	24	3	(Norway) Lyn Kristiania	1+1	0
-	FW	Rolf Maartmann	1887-11-03	24	3	(Norway) Lyn Kristiania	1+1	0
-	FW	Carl Pedersen	1891-03-27	21	0	(Norway) Urædd FK Porsgrunn	0	0
-	GK	Ingolf Pedersen	1890-12-07	21	2	(Norway) Odds Ballklubb Skien	1+1	0
-	FW	Henry Reinholt	1890-01-16	22	1	(Norway) Odds Ballklubb Skien	1+1	0
-	DF	Per Skou	1891-05-20	21	3	(Norway) Lyn Kristiania	1+1	0

== Russia ==
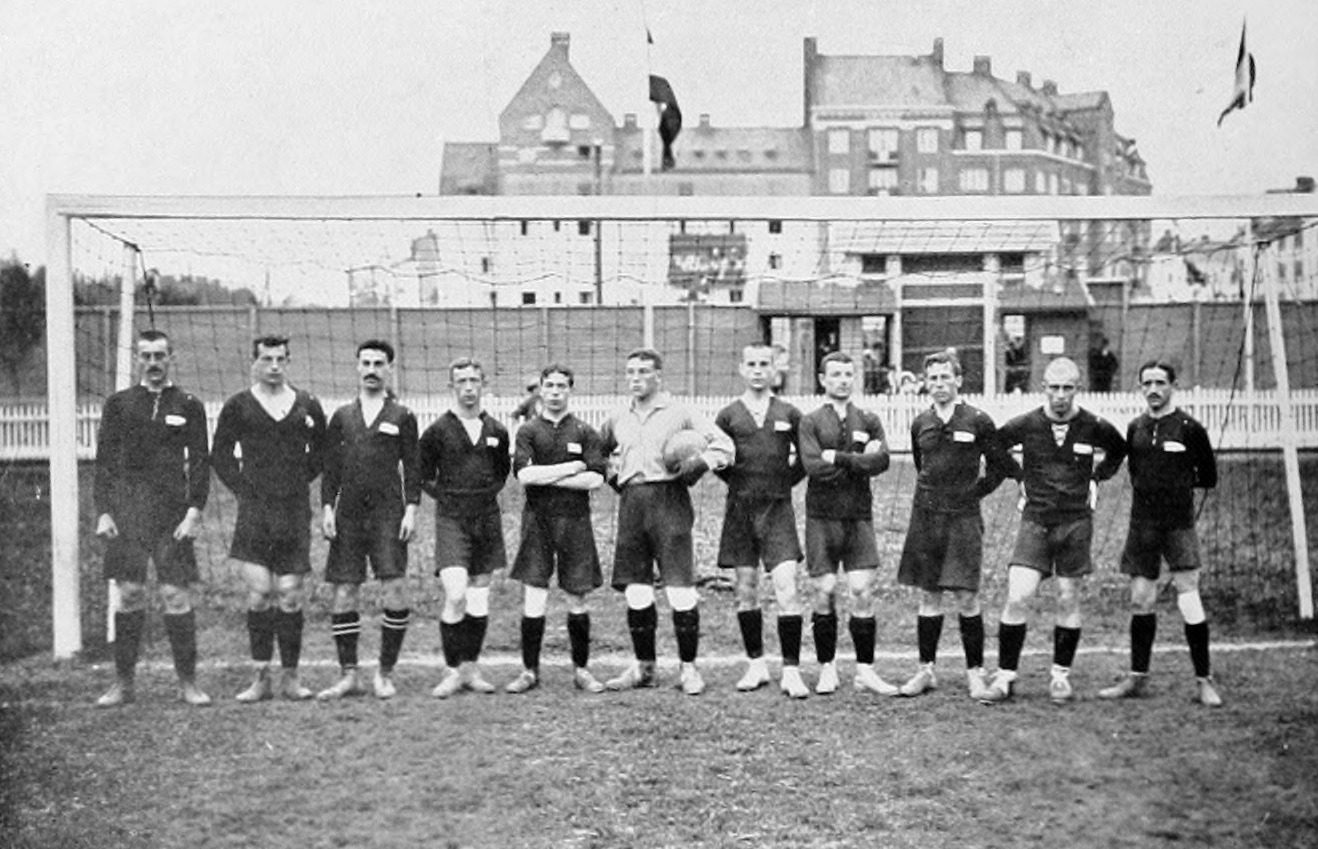
From left: Uversky, Sokolov, Nikitin, M. Smirnov, Zhitarev, Favorsky, Yakovlev, Khromov, Butusov, Rimsha, Filippov

Head coach: Robert Fulda and Georgy Dyuperron

No.	Pos.	Player	DoB	Age	Caps	Club	Tournament games	Tournament goals
-	MF	Andrey Akimov	1890-10-12	21	0	(Russia) Orekhovo Klub Sport	1+0	0
-	GK	Pyotr Boreisha	1885-02-05	27	0	(Russia) Neva St. Petersburg	0	0
-	FW	Vasily Butusov	1892-02-07	20	0	(Russia) Unitas St. Petersburg	1+1	1+0
-	GK	Lev Favorsky	1893	18	0	(Russia) Sokolnichesky Moscow	1+1	0
-	FW	Aleksandr Filippov	1892	20	0	(Russia) Sokolniki Moscow	1+0	0
-	FW	Sergei Filippov	1892-07-02	20	0	(Russia) Kolomyagi St. Petersburg	1+1	0
-	MF	Nikita Khromov	1888-05-01	24	0	(Russia) Unitas St. Petersburg	1+1	0
-	MF	Nikolai Kynin	1890	21	0	(Russia) Orekhovo Klub Sport	1+0	0
-	DF	Vladimir Markov	1889-01-20	23	0	(Russia) Sport St. Petersburg	1+0	0
-	FW	Grigori Nikitin	1889	22	0	(Russia) Sport St. Petersburg	0+1	0
-	DF	Fyodor Rimsha	1891	20	0	(Russia) Sokolnichesky Moscow	0+1	0
-	FW	Leonid Smirnov	1889	22	0	(Russia) Union Moscow	0	0
-	FW	Mikhail Smirnov	1892	30	0	(Russia) Union Moscow	1+1	0
-	DF	Pyotr Sokolov	1890-12-28	21	0	(Russia) Unitas St. Petersburg	1+1	0
-	MF	Aleksei Uversky	1886-02-14	26	0	(Russia) Sport St. Petersburg	0+1	0
-	MF	Vladimir Vlasenko	1881-01-14	31	0	(Russia) Mercur St. Petersburg	0	0
-	MF	Mikhail Yakovlev	1893-07-12	18	0	(Russia) Unitas St. Petersburg	0+1	0
-	FW	Vasily Zhitarev	1891-01-13	21	0	(Russia) Zamoskvoretsky Moscow	1+1	0
-	FW	Hjalmar Teravain			0	(Russia)	0	0

== France ==
France named the following squad, but the team withdrew before the tournament started:

- Gaston Barreau (Midfield) 07/12/1883 FEC Llevallois (France)
- Maurice Bigué (Defender) / /1887 CA XIVe (France)
- Georges Damois (Defender) 12/12/1890
- Jean Baptiste Ducret (Midfield) 27/11/1887 Etoile Deux Lacs (France)
- Alfred Gindrat (Defender) / /1884 Red Star Amical Club (France)
- Eugène Maës (Forward) 15/09/1890 Red Star Amical Club (France)
- Louis Mesnier (Forward) / /1884 CAXIVe (France)
- Maurice Louis Olivier (Forward) 10/01/1887 Etoile Deux Lacs (France)
- Paul Romano (Defender) 03/10/1891 Etoile Deux Lacs (France)
- Marcel Triboulet (Forward) 26/10/1890 FEC Llevalois (France)
- Henri Vialmonteil (Forward) / /1884 CA Vitry (France)
- Maurice Albert Thiéry (Goalkeeper) 04/09/1886
- Paul Fievet (Defender) 21/12/1886
- Émilien Devic (Forward) 16/11/1888 CAEIVe (France)
- Étienne Jourde (Forward) 13/08/1891 CA Vitry (France)
