= Filippov =

Filippov (Russian: Фили́ппов) is a Russian surname that is derived from the male given name Filipp and literally means Filipp's. Notable people with the surname include:

- Aleksandr Filippov (footballer) (1892–1962), Russian association football player
- Aleksei Fedorovich Filippov (1923–2006), Russian mathematician, professor
- Aleksei Filippov (footballer born 1973) (born 1973), retired Russian professional footballer
- Aleksei Filippov (footballer born 1975) (born 1975), Russian professional football player
- Anton Filippov (born 1986), Uzbekistani chess Grandmaster (2008)
- Dmitry Filippov (born 1969), Russian handball player
- Dmitry Nikolayevich Filippov (1944–1998), Russian-Soviet statesman, political and public figure
- Igor Filippov (painter) (born 1961), painter from Sevastopol, Ukraine
- Igor Filippov (volleyball) (born 1991), Russian volleyball player
- Maksim Filippov (born 1984), Russian professional football player
- Maria Filippov (born 1973), Bulgarian ice skater
- Nikita Filippov (pole vaulter) (born 1991), Kazakh pole vaulter
- Nikita Filippov (ski mountaineer) (born 2002), Russian ski mountaineer
- Mikhail Filippov (born 1992), Russian professional football player
- Pyotr Filippov (1893–1965), Russian Soviet football player
- Sasha Filippov (1925–1942), spy for the Red Army during the Battle of Stalingrad
- Sergei Filippov (footballer, born 1892), Russian association football player
- Sergei Filippov (footballer, born 1967), Russian association football player
- Vadim Filippov (born 1983), Russian professional football player
- Valery Filippov (born 1975), Russian chess grandmaster
- Vasily Filippov (born 1981), Russian handball player
- Vladimir Filippov (politician) (born 1951), Russian academic and politician
- Vladimir Filippov (footballer) (born 1968), Russian professional football coach and former player

== See also ==
- Filipo
- Filipov, the Bulgarian equivalent
- Filipović
- Filipovići (disambiguation)
- Filipovo (disambiguation)
- Filippo
- Filippoi
