= Sergei Romanov (disambiguation) =

Grand Duke Sergei Alexandrovich of Russia (1857 – 1905) was a son of Emperor Alexander II of Russia

Sergei Romanov may also refer to:

- Grand Duke Sergei Mikhailovich of Russia, (1869 – 1918), a grandson of Emperor Nicholas I of Russia
- Sergei Romanov (footballer, born 1897), Russian football player
- Sergei Romanov (footballer, born 1983), Russian football player
