= Pötschke =

Pötschke is a German language surname. Spelling variants include Petschke, Pietschke, Pötzschke. It stems from the male given name Peter – and may refer to:

- Martina Pötschke-Langer (1951), German public health activist
- Oliver Pötschke (1987), German footballer
- Werner Pötschke (1914–1945), German SS-Sturmbannführer
