= Sergei Filippov (disambiguation) =

Sergey Filippov (1912 – 1990) was a Russian actor

Sergei Filippov may also refer to:

- Sergei Filippov (footballer, born 1892), Russian football player
- Sergei Filippov (footballer, born 1967), Russian football player
