= Favorsky =

Favorsky is a surname. Notable people with the surname include:

- Alexey Favorsky (1860–1945), Soviet and Russian chemist
- Andrey Favorsky (1929–2005), Soviet equestrian
- Lev Favorsky (1893–1969), Russian football player
- Vladimir Favorsky (1886–1964), Soviet artist and teacher
