= Mikhail Yakovlev =

Mikhail Yakovlev may refer to:

- Mikhail Yakovlev (footballer, born 1892), Russian football player
- Mikhail Yakovlev (footballer, born 1999), Russian football player
- Mikhail Yakovlev (born 2000), Israeli racing cyclist
