= Unfried =

Unfried may refer to:

== People ==
- Emil Unfried (1892–1949), German politician
- Gustav Unfried (1889–1917), German footballer

== Other uses ==
- Unfried, Washington, a ghost town

== See also ==
- Fried (disambiguation)
