= Igor Filippov =

Igor Filippov may refer to:

- Igor Filippov (volleyball) (born 1991), Russian volleyball player
- Igor Filippov (painter) (born 1961), Ukrainian painter
