= Aleksandr Krotov =

Aleksandr Krotov may refer to:

- Aleksandr Krotov (footballer, born 1895), Russian football player
- Alyaksandr Krotaw (born 1995), Belarusian football player
