= Silipo =

Surname list

Silipo is a surname. Notable people with the surname include:

- Carlo Silipo (born 1971), Italian water polo player
- Joe Silipo (born 1957), Canadian and American football player
- Tony Silipo (1957–2012), Canadian politician

== See also ==
- Filipo
