= Aleksei Filippov =

Aleksei Filippov may refer to:

- Aleksei Filippov (footballer born 1973), Russian footballer who most notably played for FC Dynamo Moscow
- Aleksei Filippov (footballer born 1975), Russian footballer with FC Druzhba Maykop
- Aleksei Filippov (writer), Russian writer nominated for Anti-Booker prize in 2000
- Aleksei Fedorovich Filippov (1923 – 2006), Russian mathematician, professor of Moscow State University
