= Russian Empire national football team =

Former football team in the Russian Empire

Russian Empire
1910–1914
- Association: All-Russian Football Union (VFS); Всероссийский футбольный союз
- Most caps: Vasily Zhitarev (7)
- Top scorer: Vasily Zhitarev (4)
- FIFA code: RUS
First colours	Second colours

First international
- Unofficial; Russia 5–4 Bohemia (Saint Petersburg, Russia; 16 October 1910); Official; Finland 2–1 Russia (Stockholm, Sweden; 30 June 1912)

Last international
- Norway 1–1 Russia (Christiania, Norway; 12 July 1914)

Biggest win
- Russia 5–4 Bohemia (Saint Petersburg, Russia; 16 October 1910); Russia 1–0 Bohemia (Moscow, Russia; 23 October 1910)

Biggest defeat
- Germany 16–0 Russia (Stockholm, Sweden; 1 July 1912)

Summer Olympics
- Appearances: 1 (first in 1912)
- Best result: Quarter-finals in 1912

The Russian Empire national football team was the association football team representing the Russian Empire from 1910 to 1914.

== History ==
The Russian Empire played its first unofficial international in October 1910 against Bohemia national team (the Kingdom of Bohemia was then a Crown Land in Austria-Hungary), a 5–4 win. The All-Russian Football Union was founded in January 1912 and it was admitted to FIFA in the same year. The first official international for the team was the second round match against Finland national team at the 1912 Summer Olympics in Stockholm, with the Finns competing separately despite being a part of Russia at the time.

The development of league football in Russia was stopped by the outbreak of First World War in 1914. Meetings with the Germany national team and France national team were planned for the spring of 1915, but the matches were cancelled. A large number of players were killed in the war and others fled the country after the 1917 October Revolution. The Soviet Union national football team was formed in August 1923 and it was accepted by FIFA as the successor of the Russian Empire football team, itself becoming the Russia national football team in 1992.

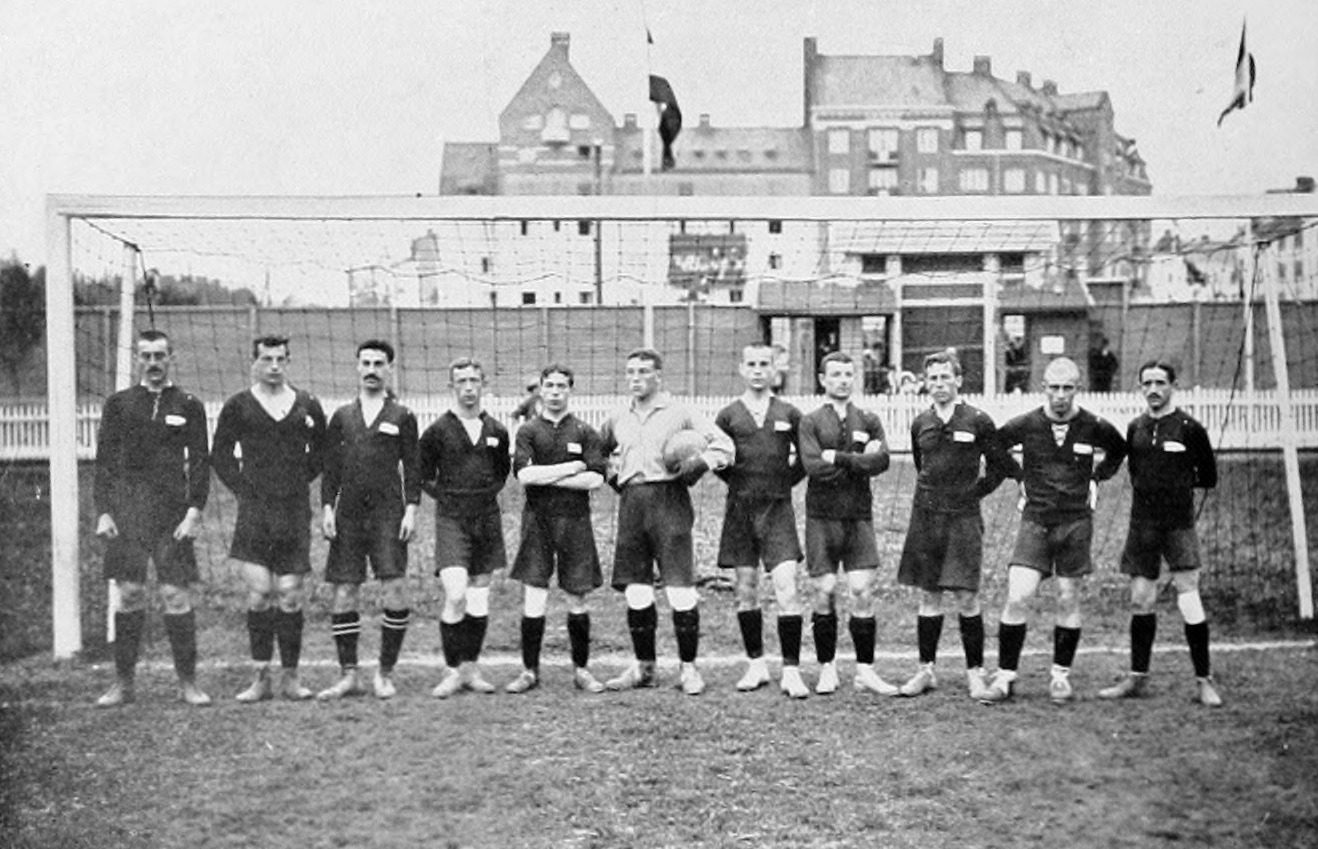
Russian Empire squad at the 1912 Olympics

== Managers ==
- (Russian Empire) Georges Duperron (1910–1913)
- (Russian Empire) Robert Fulda (1914)

== Competitive record ==
=== Olympic Games ===
Olympic Games record
Year	Result	Position	Pld	W	D	L	GF	GA	Squad
(Greece) 1896	No football tournament was held								
(France) 1900	did not enter								
(United States) 1904	did not enter								
(United Kingdom) 1908	did not enter								
(Sweden) 1912	Second round	11th	2	0	0	2	1	18	Squad
Total	Second round	1/4	2	0	0	2	1	18	—

== International results ==
=== Official ===
30 June 1912 1912 Summer Olympics	Finland	2–1	Russia	Stockholm, Sweden
	Wiberg 30'; Öhman 80'	Report	Butusov 72'	Stadium: Tranebergs Idrottsplats; Attendance: 200; Referee: Per Sjoblom (Sweden)

1 July 1912 1912 Summer Olympics – Consolation	Germany	16–0	Russia	Solna, Sweden
	Fuchs 2', 9', 21', 28', 34', 46', 51', 55', 65', 69'; Förderer 6', 27', 53', 66'; Burger 30'; Oberle 58'	Report		Stadium: Råsunda IP; Attendance: 2,000; Referee: Christiaan Groothoff (Netherlands)

3 July 1912 Friendly	Norway	2–1	Russia	Stockholm, Sweden
			Zhitarev (?)	Stadium: Tranebergs Idrottsplats

3 July 1912 Friendly	Russia	0–12	Hungary	Moscow, Russia
				Stadium: Sokolniki Park

4 May 1913 Friendly	Russia	1–4	Sweden	Moscow, Russia
	Zhitarev (?)			Stadium: Sokolniki Park

14 September 1913 Friendly	Russia	1–1	Norway	Moscow, Russia
				Stadium: Sokolniki Park

5 July 1914 Friendly	Sweden	2–2	Russia	Stockholm, Sweden
			Zhitarev (?)	Stadium: Stockholm Olympic Stadium

12 July 1914 Friendly	Norway	1–1	Russia	Christiania, Norway
				Stadium: Bislett

The Russian Empire national football team played a total number of 8 official and 8 unofficial internationals between October 1910 and July 1914.

Date	Location	Venue	Competition	Opponent	Score ^{(1)}
16 October 1910	Saint Petersburg, Russia	Sport Stadium	Unofficial match	Bohemia	5–4
23 October 1910	Moscow, Russia	ZKS Stadium	Unofficial match	Bohemia	1–0
2 September 1911	Saint Petersburg, Russia	Nevsky Stadium	Unofficial match	England Amateurs	0–14
3 September 1911	Saint Petersburg, Russia	Nevsky Stadium	Unofficial match	England Amateurs	0–7
4 September 1911	Saint Petersburg, Russia	Nevsky Stadium	Unofficial match	England Amateurs	0–11
6 May 1912	Moscow, Russia	Union Golf Club	Unofficial match	(Russia) Finland	1–1
30 June 1912	Stockholm, Sweden	Olympic Stadium	Summer Olympics	(Russia) Finland	1–2
1 July 1912	Stockholm, Sweden	Olympic Stadium	Summer Olympics	Germany	0–16
3 July 1912	Stockholm, Sweden	Tranebergs Idrottsplats	Friendly match	Norway	1–2
12 July 1912	Moscow, Russia	Sokolniki Park	Unofficial match	Hungary	0–9
14 July 1912	Moscow, Russia	Sokolniki Park	Friendly match	Hungary	0–12
29 April 1913	Saint Petersburg, Russia	Nevsky Stadium	Unofficial match	Sweden	1–5
4 May 1913	Moscow, Russia	Sokolniki Park	Friendly match	Sweden	1–4
14 September 1913	Moscow, Russia	Sokolniki Park	Friendly match	Norway	1–1
5 July 1914	Stockholm, Sweden	Olympic Stadium	Friendly match	Sweden	2–2
12 July 1914	Christiania, Norway	Bislett	Friendly match	Norway	1–1

^{(1)}Russian Empire's score is shown first.

== Head-to-head record ==
Up to matches played on 12 July 1914.

Team	Pld	W	D	L	GF	GA	GD	WPCT
Bohemia	2	2	0	0	6	4	+2	100.00
England Amateurs	3	0	0	3	0	32	−32	0.00
(Russia) Finland	2	0	1	1	2	3	−1	0.00
Germany	1	0	0	1	0	16	−16	0.00
Hungary	2	0	0	2	0	21	−21	0.00
Norway	3	0	2	1	3	4	−1	0.00
Sweden	3	0	1	2	4	11	−7	0.00
Total	16	2	4	10	15	91	−76	12.50

Source: Results

== Player records ==
Player records include official internationals only.

As of 12 July 1914

=== Most capped players ===
Rank	Name	Caps	Goals	Career
1	Vasily Zhitarev	8	4	1912–1914
2	Nikita Khromov	6	0	1912–1913
3	Vasily Butusov	5	1	1912–1913
4	Andrei Akimov	4	1	1912–1913
4	Pyotr Sokolov	4	0	1912
6	Nikolai Denisov	3	0	1913–1914
6	Lev Favorsky	3	0	1912
6	Dmitri Matrin	3	0	1912–1913
6	Aleksandr Filippov	3	0	1912–1914
6	Fyodor Rimsha	3	0	1912
6	Sergei Romanov	3	0	1913–1914
6	Mikhail Nikolayevich Smirnov	3	0	1912
6	Ivan Vorontsov	3	0	1913–1914
6	Mikhail Yakovlev	3	0	1912–1913

=== Top goalscorers ===
Rank	Name	Goals	Caps	Ratio	Career
1	Vasily Zhitarev	4	8	0.5	1912–1914
2	Valentin Vasilyevich Sysoyev	1	1	1	1913
2	Aleksandr Krotov	1	1	1	1914
2	Andrei Akimov	1	4	0.25	1912–1913
2	Vasily Butusov	1	5	0.2	1912–1913
