= Rimša =

Rimša is the masculine form of a Lithuanian family name. Polish version: Rymsza, Russian/Ukrainian: Rimsha, Belarusian: Rymsha.) Its feminine forms are: Rimšienė (married woman or widow) and Rimšaitė (unmarried woman). Notable people with the surname include:

- Edmundas Rimša (born 1948), Lithuanian historian
- Petras Rimša (1881–1961), Lithuanian sculptor
- Fyodor Rimsha (1891–1942), Russian Olympic football (soccer) player
- Andrey Rymsha (ca. 1550–1599), Belarusian poet of the Grand Duchy of Lithuania
- Filip Jan Rymsza (born 1977), Polish-born American filmmaker and writer
- Donata Rimšaitė (born 1988), female Lithuanian modern pentathlete
- Vilma Rimšaitė (born 1983), Lithuanian female Olympic BMX cyclist
