= Leonid Smirnov =

Leonid Smirnov may refer to:

- Leonid Smirnov (politician) (1916–2001), Soviet politician and engineer
- Leonid Smirnov (footballer) (1889–1980), Russian footballer
