= Otto Völker =

German footballer

Personal information
- Date of birth: 2 March 1893
- Date of death: 6 August 1945 (aged 52)
- Position: Midfielder

Senior career*
Years	Team	Apps	(Gls)
- BFC Preussen

International career
1913	Germany	1	(0)
- * Club domestic league appearances and goals

Otto Völker (2 March 1893 – 6 August 1945) was a German international footballer.
