= Dmitri Matrin =

Russian footballer

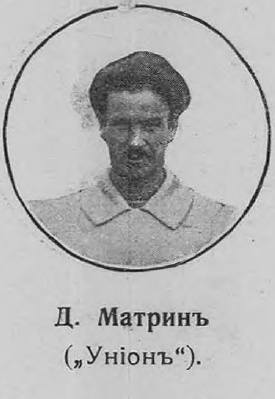

Personal information
- Full name: Dmitri Pavlovich Matrin
- Date of birth: 1891
- Place of birth: Moscow, Russian Empire
- Date of death: 1958 (aged 66–67)
- Position: Goalkeeper

Senior career*
Years	Team	Apps	(Gls)
1908–1910	Shiryayevo Pole Moscow		
1911–1914	Union Moscow		

International career
1912–1913	Russian Empire	3	(0)
- * Club domestic league appearances and goals

Dmitri Pavlovich Matrin (Russian: Дмитрий Павлович Матрин) (1891–1958) was an association football player.

== International career ==
Matrin made his debut for Russia on 14 July 1912 in a friendly against Hungary. He allowed 12 goals in a 0–12 loss, but was called up again for the team the next year.

== See also ==
- Aleksei Karakosov
