= Nikolai Denisov =

Russian footballer

Personal information
- Full name: Nikolai Mikhailovich Denisov
- Date of birth: 1891
- Place of birth: Moscow, Russian Empire
- Date of death: 1959 (aged 67–68)
- Place of death: Moscow, Soviet Union
- Position: Striker

Senior career*
Years	Team	Apps	(Gls)
1912–1913	KF Sokolniki Moscow		
1914	KS Orekhovo Orekhovo-Zuyevo		
1915–1918	KF Sokolniki Moscow		

International career
1913–1914	Russian Empire	3	(0)
- * Club domestic league appearances and goals

Nikolai Mikhailovich Denisov (Russian: Николай Михайлович Денисов; 1891 in Moscow – 1959 in Moscow) was an association football player.

== International career ==
Denisov made his debut for Russia on 14 September 1913 in a friendly against Norway.
