= Erich Massini =

German footballer

Personal information
- Date of birth: 11 September 1889
- Date of death: 26 July 1915 (aged 25)
- Position: Defender

Senior career*
Years	Team	Apps	(Gls)
- BFC Preussen

International career
1909	Germany	1	(0)
- * Club domestic league appearances and goals

Erich Massini (13 September 1889 – 26 July 1915) was a German international footballer.
