= Filipovići =

Filipovići may refer to:

- Filipovići, Foča, a village in Bosnia and Herzegovina
- Filipovići (Loznica), a village in Serbia
- Filipovići, Croatia, a village near Sveti Ivan Zelina

== See also ==
- Filipović
