= Ivan Vorontsov =

Russian footballer

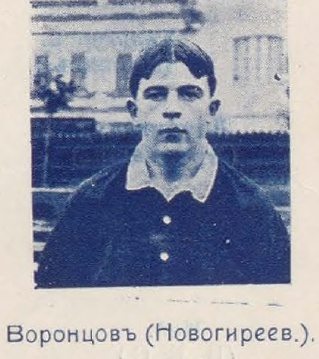
- 1913

Personal information
- Full name: Ivan Ivanovich Vorontsov
- Date of birth: 1890
- Date of death: 1917 (aged 26–27)
- Position: Defender

Senior career*
Years	Team	Apps	(Gls)
1912–1916	Novogireyevo Moscow		

International career
1913–1914	Russian Empire	3	(0)
- * Club domestic league appearances and goals

Ivan Ivanovich Vorontsov (Russian: Иван Иванович Воронцов; 1890–1917) was an association football player.

== International career ==
Vorontsov made his debut for the Russian Empire on September 14, 1913 in a friendly against Norway. He was the team's captain in that game.
