= Aleksei Karakosov =

Russian footballer

Personal information
- Full name: Aleksei Konstantinovich Karakosov
- Date of birth: 1890
- Place of birth: Saint Petersburg, Russia
- Date of death: 1917 (aged 26–27)
- Positions: Striker; midfielder

Senior career*
Years	Team	Apps	(Gls)
1907	Pavlovsky Saint Petersburg		
1909–1913	Narva Saint Petersburg		

International career
1913	Russia	1	(-2)
- * Club domestic league appearances and goals

Aleksei Konstantinovich Karakosov (Russian: Алексей Константинович Каракосов; 1890–1917) was a Russian footballer. He was born in Saint Petersburg and killed in World War I.

== International career ==
Karakosov played his only game for Russia on 4 May 1913 in a friendly against Sweden. In the 75th minute the Russian goalkeeper Dmitri Matrin was injured. Substitutions were not yet allowed, so Karakosov, a midfielder, had to take Matrin's place in goal. He let in two goals.
