= Pyotr Boreisha =

Russian Empire footballer (1885–1953)

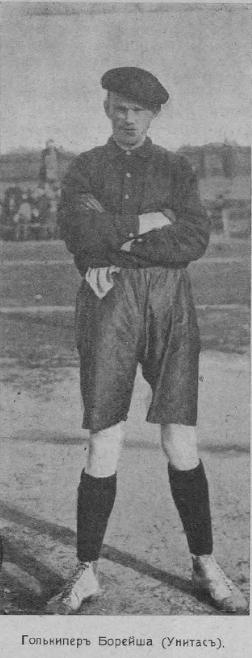
- Boreisha in 1912

Personal information
- Full name: Pyotr Isidorovich Boreisha
- Date of birth: 5 February 1885
- Place of birth: Saint Petersburg, Russian Empire
- Date of death: 17 July 1953 (aged 68)
- Place of death: Paris, France
- Position: Goalkeeper

Senior career*
Years	Team	Apps	(Gls)
1906–1911	Viktoria Saint Petersburg		
1912	Neva Saint Petersburg		
1913	Unitas Saint Petersburg		

International career
1911–1913	Russian Empire	3	(0)
- * Club domestic league appearances and goals

Pyotr Isidorovich Boreisha (Russian: Пётр Исидорович Борейша; 5 February 1885 – 17 July 1953) was a Russian footballer who played as a goalkeeper.

== Football career ==
Boreysha was called up to the Russian Empire's squad for the 1912 Summer Olympics, but didn't play any matches. Despite not playing any official international matches, he did represent the Russian Empire in three unofficial matches, against England's amateur national team and two against Sweden.

At club level, he finished as runners-up in the 1906 and 1908 Saint Petersburg championships, and won the Russian Empire championship with Saint Petersburg in 1912.

== Outside of football ==
Boreysha studied at the Saint Petersburg Electrotechnical University, and worked as a proofreader at newspaper Birzhevyie Vedomosti and Russkie Novosti. During World War I, he served as a staff captain in the 164th Zakatala Infantry Regiment, before being wounded in 1914. For his service, he was awarded the orders of Saint Anna and Saint Stanislaus.

After the Russian Revolution, he joined the Whites' Northern Army as a clerk, and later adjutant. In 1920, following their defeat, he escaped to France via. Norway, living in Paris as a taxi driver and proofreader for the Russian community in exile. Additionally, he founded the Russian Sports Society in France.

== Personal life ==
Boreysha was married and had a daughter. He died on 17 July 1953, at the age of 68, and is buried at the Sainte-Geneviève-des-Bois Russian Cemetery, alongside his daughter.
