= Rudolf Droz =

German footballer

Personal information
- Date of birth: 9 January 1888
- Place of birth: Magdeburg
- Date of death: 27 November 1946
- Place of death: Magdeburg
- Position: Forward

Senior career*
Years	Team	Apps	(Gls)
1904–1908	Magdeburger FC Viktoria		
1908–1920	BFC Preussen		

International career
1911	Germany	1	(0)
- * Club domestic league appearances and goals

Rudolf Droz (born 9 January 1888, 27 November 1946) was a German international footballer. He was capped once for the Germany national team, in a friendly against Sweden on 18 June 1911.
