= Filip Filipov =

Bulgarian footballer

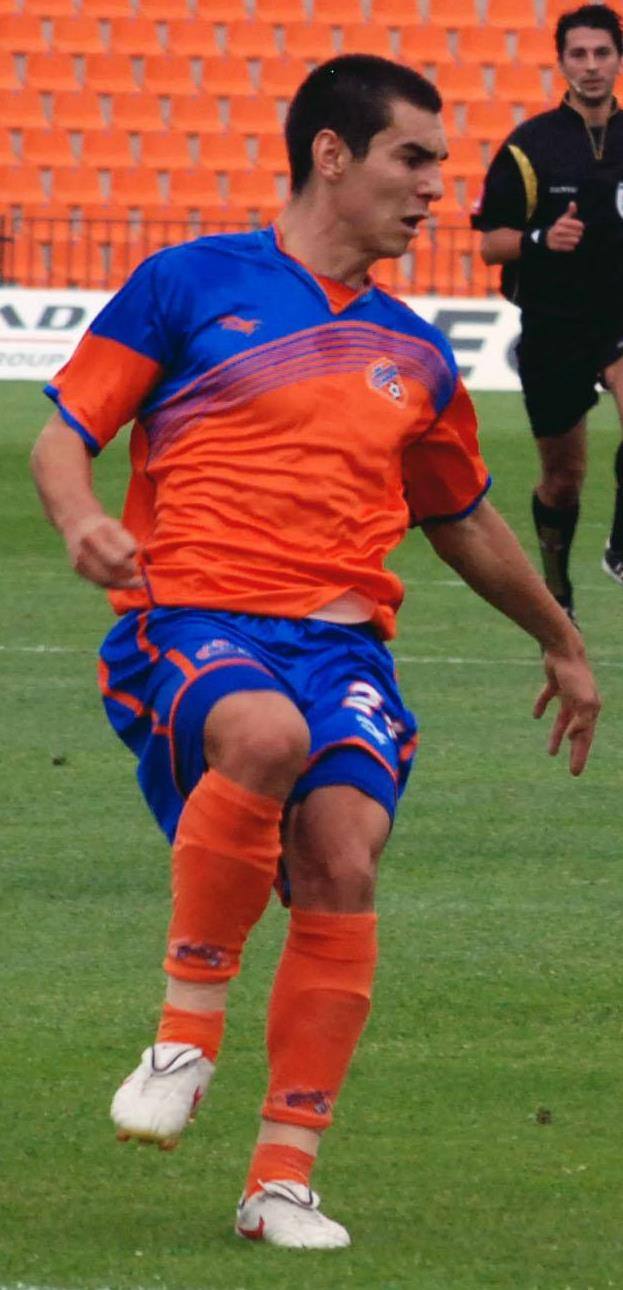

Personal information
- Full name: Filip Stanimirov Filipov
- Date of birth: 2 August 1988 (age 38)
- Place of birth: Lovech, Bulgaria
- Height: 1.77 m (5 ft 10 in)
- Position: Right back

Youth career
- Litex Lovech

Senior career*
Years	Team	Apps	(Gls)
2006–2007	Litex Lovech	0	(0)
2007–2009	Lokomotiv Mezdra	13	(0)
2009–2010	Sliven	43	(1)
2011–2013	Slavia Sofia	50	(1)
2013–2016	Botev Plovdiv	53	(0)
2016–2018	Ethnikos Achna	51	(3)
2018–2022	Botev Plovdiv	107	(1)
2021–2022	Botev Plovdiv II	11	(1)

International career
2008–2009	Bulgaria U21	4	(0)
- * Club domestic league appearances and goals as of 1 July 2022

Filip Stanimirov Filipov (Bulgarian: Филип Филипов; born 2 August 1988) is a Bulgarian former footballer who played as a defender.

== Career ==
=== Early career ===
Filipov start to play football in Litex Lovech. In June 2007 signed with Lokomotiv Mezdra.

He made his competitive debut for Loko Mezdra in Bulgarian top division on 9 August 2008 against Spartak Varna in the first round of the season 2008–09. In season 2007–08, Filipov earned 12 appearances playing with the team in second division.

=== Botev Plovdiv ===
In August 2013 Filipov was transferred to Botev Plovdiv upon request of the manager Stanimir Stoilov for undisclosed fee and he signed a 3-year contract. In his first season, he took part in 8 games in A Grupa and 2 games for the Bulgarian Cup.

In the summer of 2014 Filipov remained in Botev Plovdiv despite the financial crisis in the team. Velislav Vutsov preferred to use Bozhidar Vasev and Yordan Hristov as left and right defender therefore Filipov remained on the bench in most games. After the replacement of Vutsov as a manager, Petar Penchev started to use Bozhidar Vasev as a midfielder and Filipov or Lazar Marin were more often included in the starting lineup on the left side of the defense. Filipov played during the -0-2 away win over Lokomotiv Plovdiv, 2–0 home win over CSKA Sofia and the 0–0 draw during the visit to Ludogorets Razgrad.

On 9 February 2018 Filipov returned to Botev Plovdiv.

== International career ==
Filipov made his debut for Bulgaria U21 on 11 October 2008 in a friendly match against Greece U21.
