= BFC Preussen =

German association football club

- Full name: Berliner Fußballclub Preussen e.V.
- Nickname: The Prussians
- Founded: 1 May 1894; 132 years ago
- Ground: Preussen-Stadion an der Malteserstraße
- Capacity: 3,000
- Chairman: Karl-Heinz Ulbrich
- Manager: Daniel Volbert
- League: Regionalliga Nordost (IV)
- 2025–26: Regionalliga Nordost, 8th of 18
Home colours	Away colours

BFC Preussen is a German football club from Berlin. The team is part of a sports club which also has departments for handball, volleyball, athletics, gymnastics, and ice hockey. Preussen was one of the founding clubs of the German Football Association in Leipzig in 1900.

== History ==
The club was formed as BFC Friedrich Wilhelm on 1 May 1894 by a number of players who had left Hevellia Berlin. It was named in honour of Crown Prince Wilhelm, an early and enthusiastic supporter of the new game of football who donated the Kronprinzenpokal (en: Crown Prince's Cup), the German game's earliest prize. In 1895, the club was renamed Preußen for the Kingdom of Prussia, and went on to success playing in the Verband Deutscher Ballspiel Vereine (Federation of German Ballgame Teams). The team lost the league final in 1898 before going on to win three consecutive titles in 1899–1901, and then repeating as champions in 1910 and 1912. While Preußen remained a prominent side playing in the Verbandsliga Berlin-Brandenburg and Oberliga Berlin-Brandenburg through to the early 1930s, they earned just mid-table results.

In 1933, German football was re-organized under the Third Reich into sixteen regional first division Gauligen. However, an uncharacteristically poor finish to the 1932–33 season that saw Preußen finish in last place put the club out of top-flight football. In the aftermath of World War II occupying Allied authorities banned organizations throughout Germany, including sports and football clubs, as part of the process of denazification. The club was dissolved, then re-established in 1949.

By the 1970s, Preussen had settled into third-tier competition in the Amateurliga Berlin (III). A short-lived breakthrough to the Regionalliga Berlin (II) lasted two seasons from 1972 to 1974 before the team briefly crashed to the Landesliga Berlin (IV) in 1974–75. The team's quick return to the third tier Amateur Oberliga Berlin was marked by five exceptional seasons in which they earned three first and two second-place finishes. They narrowly missed promotion to the 2. Bundesliga in 1980 when they lost the playoff to SC Göttingen 05 (0–1 and 1–1). Preußen played out the balance of the 1970s and on into the early 1990s in the third division.

The team soon found itself in the fifth tier Verbandsliga Berlin and slipped as low as the Landesliga Berlin-1 (VI) in 1999–2000. In 2011–12, they were demoted from the Berlin-Liga (VI) after an 18th-place result. After three seasons in the Landesliga they were promoted back to the Berlin-Liga by winning the 2014–15 Landesliga Berlin 1.

== Current squad ==
As of 8 September 2026

Note: Flags indicate national team as defined under FIFA eligibility rules; some limited exceptions apply. Players may hold more than one non-FIFA nationality.

No.	Pos.	Nation	Player
1	GK	GER	Florian Palmowski
2	DF	GER	Ede Gramberg
3	FW	MAD	Kanto Fitiavana Voahariniaina
4	DF	GER	Nino Lessel
5	DF	GER	Leo Sommerfeld
6	MF	GER	Lucas Vierling
7	MF	GER	Philip Fontein
8	DF	GER	Oliver Maric
9	FW	GER	Aboudoul-Rachid Tchadjei
10	MF	GER	Maurice Čović
11	MF	GER	Alexander Dikarev
14	FW	GER	Luca Butkovic
15	MF	GER	Jasin Abou-Chaker

No.	Pos.	Nation	Player
17	MF	GER	Luis Inderwisch
18	MF	GER	Oluwaseunnla Adekunle
19	FW	GER	Finn Cramer
19	FW	GER	Joscha Wosz
21	DF	SEY	Charmaine Häusl
27	GK	GER	Karl Albers
29	MF	GER	Melvin Berkemer
30	FW	GER	Nikolas Frank
37	MF	MKD	Luan Midzaiti
39	DF	GER	Lenny Stein
77	DF	GER	Ben Meyer
-	GK	GER	Finley Bishop

== International players ==
- (Germany) Rudolf Droz, German international
- (Germany) (England) Edwin Dutton, former German international
- (Germany) Alfred "Puttchen" Gelbhaar, German international
- (Germany) Erich Massini, German international
- (Philippines) (Germany) Oliver Pötschke, Filipino international
- (Germany) Otto Thiel, German international
- (Germany) Gustav Unfried, German international
- (Germany) Otto Völker, German international

== Honours ==
The club's honours:

- Brandenburg football championship
  - Champions: 1899, 1900, 1901, 1910, 1912
- Oberliga Berlin (III)
  - Champions: 1972, 1977, 1980, 1981
- Verbandsliga Berlin (V)
  - Champions: 2005
- Berliner Landespokal
  - Winners 1979, 1980, 1981, 2016
  - Runners-up 1988

== Recent seasons ==
Year	Division	Position	Points	Goal difference
2000–01	Verbandsliga Berlin (V)	2nd	83	+55
2001–02	Verbandsliga Berlin (V)	8th	58	+7
2002–03	Verbandsliga Berlin (V)	5th	56	+14
2003–04	Verbandsliga Berlin (V)	3rd	62	+19
2004–05	Verbandsliga Berlin (V)	1st	79	+41
2005–06	NOFV-Oberliga Nord (IV)	11th	38	+1
2006–07	NOFV-Oberliga Nord (IV)	8th	39	−6
2007–08	NOFV-Oberliga Nord (IV)	13th	20	−44
2008–09	NOFV-Oberliga Nord (IV)	15th	28	−19
2009–10	Berlin-Liga (VI)	12th	49	+17
2010–11	Berlin-Liga (VI)	15th	37	−11
2011–12	Berlin-Liga (VI)	18th	32	−28
2012–13	Landesliga Berlin 2 (VII)	10th	39	+17
2013–14	Landesliga Berlin 1 (VII)	3rd	68	+52
2014–15	Landesliga Berlin 1 (VII)	1st	73	+81
2015–16	Berlin-Liga (VI)	5th		
