= Filipov =

Filipov (Bulgarian: Филипов), female form Filipova (Bulgarian: Филипова), is a Bulgarian surname.

It is a commonly used surname in North Macedonia. A large Filipov family exists in Australia that immigrated there in the late 1960s.

== Notable people ==
Notable people who have this surname include:

- Filip Filipov, Bulgarian football player
- Georgi Filipov, Bulgarian football player
- Grisha Filipov, Bulgarian politician
- Nadiya Filipova, Bulgarian rowing cox
- Pavlina Filipova, Bulgarian biathlete
- Strashimira Filipova, Bulgarian volleyball player
- Tsvetan Filipov, Bulgarian football player
- Tsvetomira Filipova, Bulgarian rhythmic gymnast
- Venelin Filipov, Bulgarian football player

== See also ==
- Filippov, the Russian equivalent
