= Filipovići (Loznica) =

Filipovići Филиповићи (Serbian)
- Village (Selo)
- Location within Serbia
- Coordinates: 44°30′10″N 19°26′53″E
- Country: Serbia
- District: Mačva District
- Municipality: Loznica

Population (2002)
  - Total: 177
- Time zone: UTC+1 (CET)
  - Summer (DST): UTC+2 (CEST)

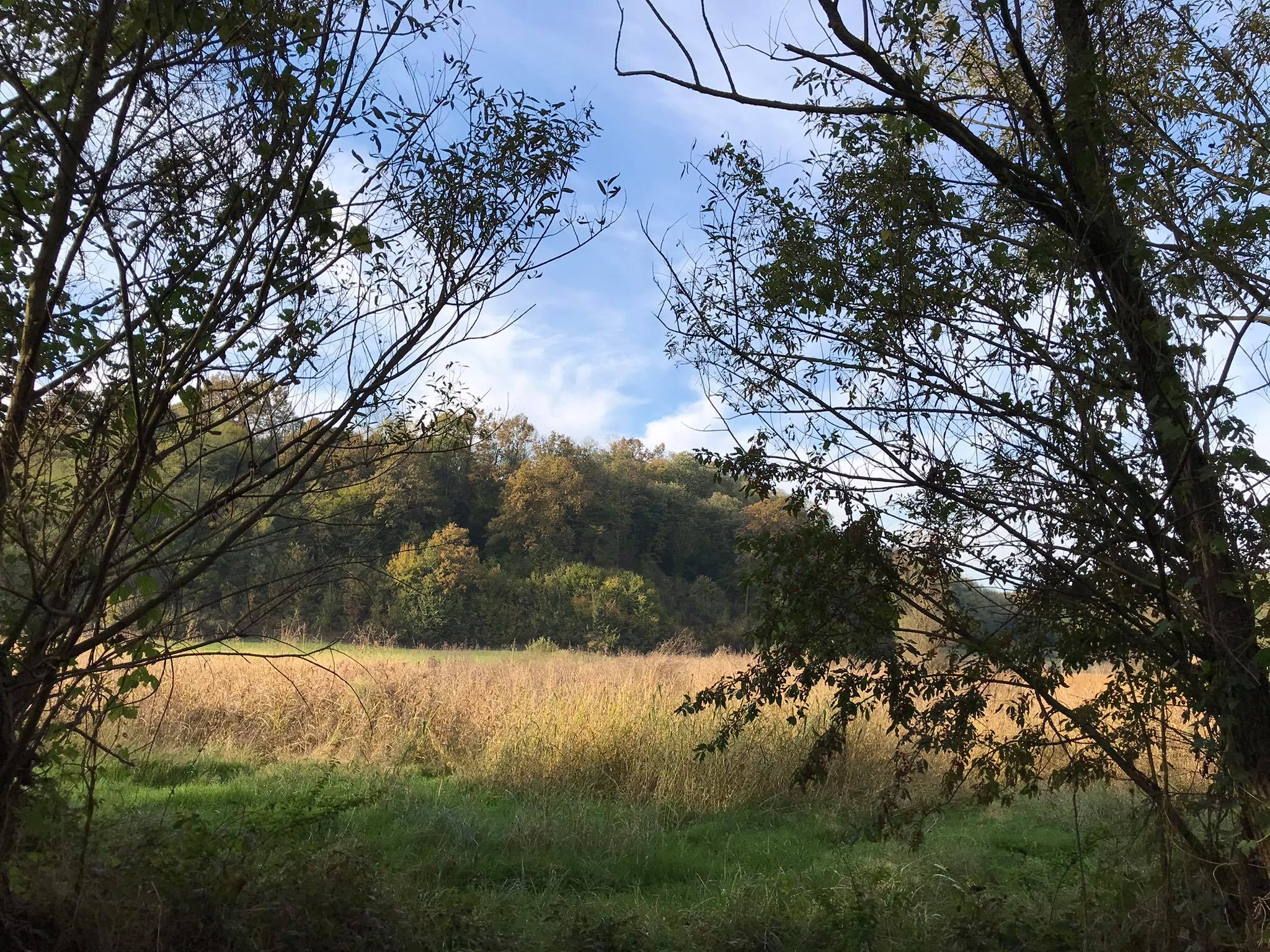

Filipovići is a village in the municipality of Loznica, Serbia. According to the 2002 census, the village has a population of 177 people.
