= Georges Duperron =

Russian journalist (1877–1934)

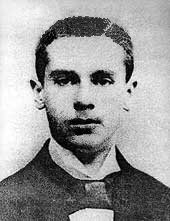

Personal information
- Full name: Georges Aleksandrovich Duperron
- Date of birth: 24 September 1877
- Place of birth: Saint Petersburg, Russia
- Date of death: 23 July 1934 (aged 56)
- Place of death: Leningrad, Soviet Union

Managerial career
- Years: Team
- 1910–1913: Russian Empire

Georges Aleksandrovich Duperron (Russian: Георгий Александрович Дюперрон, romanized: Georgy Aleksandrovich Dyuperron; 24 September [O.S. 12 September] 1877 – 23 July 1934) was a Russian sports journalist, football organizer and one of the founders of the Olympic movement in Russia. He was of French descent.

== Career ==
Duperron was a footballer who played at the first ever football match in Russia. It was arranged on 24 October 1897 in Saint Petersburg. In 1901, he was one of the organizers of the first Russian football league, the St. Petersburg Football League. After the establishment of the Russian Olympic Committee in 1911, Duperron was elected as its first secretary. From 1913 to 1915, he was a member of the International Olympic Committee. Duperron was also the first manager of the Russian national team as the team participated in the 1912 Summer Olympics in Stockholm.

Duperron published more than 30 books about football, athletics, gymnastics and winter sports.

== Personal life ==
His wife, Margarita Matveevna Duperron (Charskaya), born in 1908 and a native of Vladivostok, was not affiliated with any political party. After the death of her husband, she lived at his expense. She was arrested on 18 January 1938. On 18 June, by the commission of the NKVD and the USSR Prosecutor's Office, she was sentenced under Article 58 of the Criminal Code of the RSFSR to capital punishment and shot in Leningrad on 9 July.
