= Sigurd Brekke =

Norwegian footballer (1890-1958)

Personal information
- Date of birth: 15 October 1890
- Place of birth: Oslo, Norway
- Date of death: 25 April 1958 (aged 67)
- Place of death: Bergen, Norway

International career
Years	Team	Apps	(Gls)
- Norway

Sigurd Brekke (15 October 1890 – 25 April 1958) was a Norwegian footballer. He played in one match for the Norway national football team in 1910.
