= Mathias Widerøe-Aas =

Norwegian footballer (1886-1960)

Personal information
- Date of birth: 12 December 1886
- Place of birth: Oslo, Norway
- Date of death: 23 February 1960 (aged 73)
- Place of death: Oslo, Norway

International career
Years	Team	Apps	(Gls)
- Norway

Mathias Widerøe-Aas (12 December 1886 – 23 February 1960) was a Norwegian footballer. He played in two matches for the Norway national football team in 1908 and 1910.
