= Nikita Khromov =

Russian and Soviet footballer

Personal information
- Full name: Nikita Akimovich Khromov
- Date of birth: 1 May 1888
- Place of birth: Saint Petersburg, Russian Empire
- Date of death: 1934 (aged 45–46)
- Place of death: Rostov-on-Don, Soviet Union
- Position: Midfielder

Senior career*
Years	Team	Apps	(Gls)
1909–1910	Nadezhda St. Petersburg		
1911	Udelnaya St. Petersburg		
1911–1913	Unitas St. Petersburg		
1914–1918	Putilovsky Petrograd		
1923	OKA Tiflis		
1924–1925	Zheldor Taganrog		
1926–1927	Krasny Traktor Rostov-on-Don		

International career
1912–1913	Russian Empire	6	(0)
- * Club domestic league appearances and goals

Nikita Akimovich Khromov (Russian: Никита Акимович Хромов; 1 May 1888 in Saint Petersburg – 1934 in Rostov-on-Don) was a Russian and Soviet football player. Khromov made his debut for the Russian Empire on 30 June 1912 in a 1912 Olympics game against Finland.

== Honours ==
- Russia Champion: 1912
