= Julius Clementz =

Norwegian footballer (1890-1961)

Personal information
- Date of birth: 24 May 1890
- Place of birth: Oslo, Norway
- Date of death: 3 August 1961 (aged 71)
- Place of death: Oslo, Norway

International career
Years	Team	Apps	(Gls)
- Norway

Julius Clementz (24 May 1890 – 3 August 1961) was a Norwegian footballer. He played in two matches for the Norway national football team in 1910 and 1911.
