= Sergei Romanov (footballer, born 1897) =

Russian footballer

Personal information
- Full name: Sergei Isidorovich Romanov
- Date of birth: January 14, 1897
- Place of birth: Moscow, Russian Empire
- Date of death: August 20, 1970 (aged 73)
- Place of death: Moscow, Soviet Union
- Position: Striker

Senior career*
Years	Team	Apps	(Gls)
1913–1920	ZKS Moscow		
1921	SKZ Moscow		
1922	RSKS Moscow		

International career
1913–1914	Russian Empire	3	(0)
- * Club domestic league appearances and goals

Sergei Isidorovich Romanov (Russian: Серге́й Исидорович Романов) (January 14, 1897, in Moscow – August 20, 1970, in Moscow) was an association football player.

== International career ==
Romanov made his debut for Russian Empire on September 14, 1913, in a friendly against Norway.
