= Per Haraldsen =

Norwegian footballer (1892-1928)

Personal information
- Date of birth: 5 December 1892
- Place of birth: Skien, Norway
- Date of death: 20 February 1928 (aged 35)
- Place of death: Skien, Norway

International career
| Years | Team | Apps | (Gls) |
- Norway

Per Haraldsen (5 December 1892 – 20 February 1928) was a Norwegian footballer. He played in four matches for the Norway national football team between 1912 and 1916.
