= Mikhail Smirnov (footballer, born 1881) =

Russian footballer

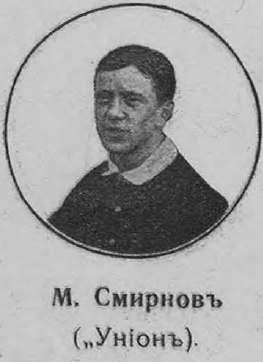

Personal information
- Full name: Mikhail Nikolayevich Smirnov
- Date of birth: 1881
- Place of birth: Moscow, Russian Empire
- Date of death: 1957 (aged 75–76)
- Position: Striker

Senior career*
Years	Team	Apps	(Gls)
1907–1909	Bykovo Moscow		
1910–1911	SKS Moscow		
1912–1914	Union Moscow		

International career
1912	Russian Empire	3	(0)
- * Club domestic league appearances and goals

Mikhail Nikolayevich Smirnov (Russian: Михаил Николаевич Смирнов) (1881 in Moscow – 1957) was an association football player. Smirnov made his debut for Russia on June 30, 1912 in a 1912 Olympics game against Finland.
