= Sergei Romanov (footballer, born 1983) =

Russian footballer

Personal information
- Full name: Sergei Gennadyevich Romanov
- Date of birth: 11 March 1983 (age 43)
- Height: 1.74 m (5 ft 8 1/2 in)
- Position: Defender

Senior career*
Years	Team	Apps	(Gls)
2001–2003	FC Torpedo-Metallurg Moscow	9	(0)
2003–2004	FC Severstal Cherepovets	37	(0)
- * Club domestic league appearances and goals

Sergei Gennadyevich Romanov (Russian: Сергей Геннадьевич Романов; born 11 March 1983) is a former Russian football player.
