= Thoralf Grubbe =

Norwegian footballer (1891-1951)

Personal information
- Date of birth: 20 July 1891
- Place of birth: Holden Municipality, Norway
- Date of death: 6 September 1951 (aged 60)
- Place of death: Skien, Norway

International career
| Years | Team | Apps | (Gls) |
- Norway

Thoralf Grubbe (20 July 1891 – 6 September 1951) was a Norwegian footballer. He played in one match for the Norway national football team in 1912.
