= Felix Tekusch =

Austrian footballer

Personal information
- Date of birth: 11 May 1889
- Date of death: 21 May 1916 (aged 27)
- Position: Defender

International career
Years	Team	Apps	(Gls)
1910–1914	Austria	9	(0)

Felix Tekusch (11 May 1889 – 21 May 1916) was an Austrian footballer. He played in nine matches for the Austria national football team from 1910 to 1914. He was also part of Austria's squad for the football tournament at the 1912 Summer Olympics, but he did not play in any matches. He was killed in action during World War I.
