= Gustaf Holmström =

Finnish footballer (1888-1970)

Personal information
- Date of birth: 27 November 1888
- Place of birth: Helsinki, Finland
- Date of death: 24 February 1970 (aged 81)
- Place of death: Helsinki, Finland

International career
Years	Team	Apps	(Gls)
- Finland

Gustaf Holmström (27 November 1888 – 24 February 1970) was a Finnish footballer. He played in one match for the Finland national football team in 1911.
