= Filipo =

Filipo or Filipos is a given name and a surname. The following people have that name:

Surname

- Ross Ami Filipo (born 1979), professional rugby union footballer

Given name

- Filipo Archinto (1500–1558), an Italian theologian and diplomat.
- Filipo Lavea Levi (born 1979), a New Zealand-born Samoan rugby union footballer
- Filipo Tirado (born 1949), a Puerto Rican puppeteer
- Filipos Woldeyohannes, commander of Eritrea 's Operation Zone 2 Eritrea
