= Filipo Tirado =

Puerto Rican puppeteer

Filipo Tirado (born September 20, 1949) is a Puerto Rican puppeteer.

Filipo's birth name was Carlos Filipo Tirado Perea.

Filipo Tirado began as a puppeteer in 1967 after graduating from high school. Has participated in T.V. shows in Puerto Rico, among them "Ay Bendito", "Que Pueblito", directed by Elin Ortiz, "La Hora de Oro" with Hector Marcano, puppeteering two magpies at the same time, called Kilate & Pirita, among others. He also participated in children's shows with Luis Antonio Cosme and Sandra Zaiter.

After almost three decades of working in different shows in Puerto Rico, Filipo headed to Miami, Florida where he was contracted by Univision. There he created his character of "Pepe Locuaz." After his contract was up, Filipo and his "Pepe Locuaz" character went to work for Telemundo.

== See also ==
- List of Puerto Ricans
- Clorofilo from Happy Hour in Americateve.
