= Pyotr Sokolov (footballer) =

Russian footballer and spy

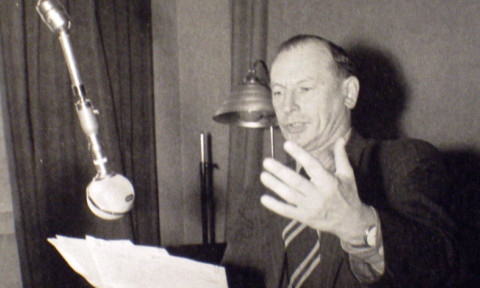

Personal information
- Full name: Pyotr Petrovich Sokolov
- Date of birth: 28 February 1891
- Place of birth: Saint Petersburg, Russian Empire
- Date of death: 11 May 1971 (aged 80)
- Place of death: Enköping, Sweden
- Position: Defender

Senior career*
Years	Team	Apps	(Gls)
1909–1911	Udelnaya Saint Petersburg		
1911–1917	Unitas Saint Petersburg		

International career
1912	Russian Empire	4	(0)
- * Club domestic league appearances and goals

Pyotr Petrovich Sokolov (Russian: Пётр Петрович Соколов, 16 February 1891 (OS)/28 February 1891 (NS) – 11 May 1971) was a Russian football player who competed in the 1912 Summer Olympics. After the October Revolution of 1917, he was a military intelligence officer who fought against Soviet power.

== Biography ==
=== Football career ===
Sokolov played for the clubs Udelnaya (1909–1911) and Unitas (1911–1917) (St. Petersburg/Petrograd). He was Champion of Russia 1912, Champion of St. Petersburg 1912, and Winner of the Spring Cup in 1911, 1912, 1913. He played four matches for the Russian national team (including two matches for the Russian Olympic team). He also played for the Russian national team in one unofficial match.

Sokolov was a member of the Russian Olympic squad and played one match in the main tournament as well as one match in the consolation tournament.

=== Intelligence career ===
During the First World War, Sokolov entered the 3rd Peterhof Warrant Officer School, which he graduated in 1917 and was promoted to warrant officer. He was an ardent monarchist. According to the Finnish detective police (VALPO), in 1917 he served in military counterintelligence in the Tornio region (north of the Gulf of Bothnia).

After the Russian Revolution of 1917, Sokolov did not accept the Soviet regime. In August 1918 he joined the White Guard organization associated with British intelligence. In the period from 1918 to 1922 he worked for the British Secret Service Bureau, where he collaborated with Paul Dukes.

From 1919, Sokolov lived in Terijoki, where he headed a reconnaissance point (general leadership in the region was carried out by former warrant officer Nikolai Bunakov). During the Kronstadt uprising (March 1921), he equipped a convoy with flour to Terijoki and accompanied it to Kronstadt.

Since 1923, Sokolov practically headed the counterintelligence of the Russian émigrés in Finland and identified Joint State Political Directorate (OGPU) agents. He was one of the active members of the Russian All-Military Union in Finland. In 1927, after the trial of 26 Anglo-Finnish spies in Leningrad, at the request of the Soviet authorities, he was forced to leave Terijoki and settle in Perkjärvi (now Kirillovskoye). OGPU repeatedly tried to persuade him to cooperate through his relatives, but he always refused.

At the end of 1930, Sokolov moved to Helsinki. He worked at the Fennia tobacco factory as a loader. He was under the close supervision and tutelage of the Finnish authorities. In 1936, he became a citizen of Finland.

During World War II, Sokolov served with the Finnish Defence Forces in the Winter War and Continuation War. He held the rank of captain and served in the propaganda department of the General Staff of the Finnish Army under the command of Major Kalle Lehmus, where he processed and read out reports from the front line. Until September 1944, he edited Severnoye Slovo, the Russian-language newspaper for the prisoners of war. He repeatedly traveled to prisoner-of-war camps in Finland and Karelia, where he called the prisoners to fight against Bolshevism and participated in the selection of personnel to be deployed to the rear of the USSR. His pseudonyms were "Kolberg", "Simolin", and "Sokolovsky".

Sokolov taught various disciplines at intelligence schools. Boris Bazhanov met with him in Helsinki and unsuccessfully tried to persuade him to cooperate with the Vlasov movement on the subject of training intelligence personnel.

With Finland's exit from the war in September 1944, Sokolov secretly left Finland (he was a priority target of SMERSH and the Zhdanov Commission, whom he successfully evaded) and moved through the north to Sweden. He changed his name to Peter Sahlin and settled in Enköping, where he worked at a local sports club. He married Jutta Salin, a Swede, with whom he had two sons (he had three daughters from his first marriage). He died in 1971 from a brain tumor. He was buried in the local St. Olof cemetery under the name Paul (Peter) Salin.
