= Martina Pötschke-Langer =

German public health activist and WHO adviser

- Born: 1951 (age 74–75)
- Died: 13 June 2022
- Education: University of Heidelberg
- Occupation: Public health activist
- Employer: World Health Organization

Martina Pötschke-Langer (1951–2022) was a German public health activist.

== Life and work ==
Pötschke-Langer graduated from high school in 1970 and went on to study at the University of Heidelberg. She became head of the Cancer Prevention Unit at the German Cancer Research Center ("Deutsches Krebsforschungszentrum") in 1997. She became an advisor to the World Health Organization (WHO) in 1999 and in 2002 was made head of the WHO Collaborating Centre for Tobacco Control.

A central goal of her health policy commitment was to educate people about the dangers of all forms of smoking, including electric cigarettes and all its variants, including "Smokeless Tobacco" such as chewing tobacco and snuff. In the clinical field, she named tobacco cessation and dangerous tobacco additives as focal points. In the scientific field, she said, it is necessary to further investigate tobacco dependence and to implement ways of smoking cessation as well as "evidence-based measures of tobacco prevention and tobacco control against the interests of the tobacco lobby." Pötschke-Langer called for the maintenance of a trade ban in Europe for oral tobacco products. These conflicting positions were the cause of recurring social controversies in health policy.

She was awarded the Order of the Cross of Merit on Ribbon by the Federal Republic of Germany in 2007, for her work on cancer prevention and non-smokers' rights. She also received the WHO's Tobacco Free World Award for her "outstanding contributions to public health", in 1999; and jointly with her colleagues in 2007 and 2011. She was an honorary member of the German Association of Pulmonology.

== Selected publications ==
Pötschke-Langer was a specialist author and editor of popular scientific publications in her field. Her publications included the series "Red Series on Tobacco Prevention and Tobacco Control by the DKFZ," in which she was responsible for 30 publications up to 2016. She also published in national and international journals.

== Selected honors and awards ==
- 2007: Cross of Merit with Ribbon of the Order of Merit of the Federal Republic of Germany (2007)
- 2007: Non-smoker of the year 2007
- 2009: Corresponding member of the German Society for Pneumology and Respiratory Medicine
- 2022: German Cancer Aid Prize (posthumous)
- Repeated awards from the WHO
- Associate member of the Medicines Commission since 2006
