= Grigori Nikitin =

Russian footballer

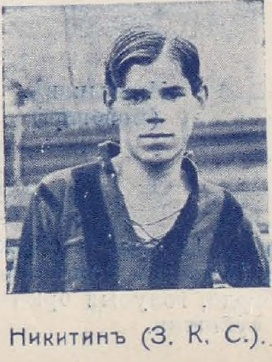

Personal information
- Full name: Grigori Mikhailovich Nikitin
- Date of birth: 1889
- Place of birth: Saint Petersburg
- Date of death: 1917 (aged 27–28)
- Position: Forward

Senior career*
Years	Team	Apps	(Gls)
1906	Natsionaly Saint Petersburg		
1907–1913	Sport Saint Petersburg		

International career
1912	Russia	1	(0)
- * Club domestic league appearances and goals

Grigori Mikhailovich Nikitin (Russian: Григорий Михайлович Никитин) (born 1889; died 1917) was an association football player. He was killed in action during World War I.

Nikitin played his only game for Russia on 1 July 1912 in a 1912 Olympics match against Germany.

== See also ==
- List of Olympians killed in World War I
