= Vasily Zhitarev =

Russian footballer

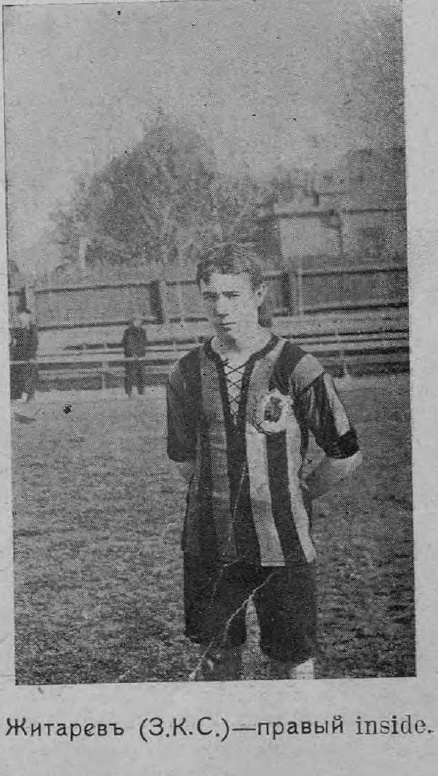

Personal information
- Full name: Vasily Georgievich Zhitarev
- Date of birth: January 13, 1891
- Place of birth: Moscow, Russian Empire
- Date of death: April 13, 1961 (aged 70)
- Place of death: Moscow, Soviet Union
- Height: 1.74 m (5 ft 9 in)
- Position: Striker

Senior career*
| Years | Team | Apps | (Gls) |
| 1908–1910 | KFS Moscow | | |
| 1911–1918 | Zamoskvoretsky Moscow | | |
| 1919–1922 | KFS Moscow | | |
| 1923–1924 | Dynamo Moscow | | |

International career
| 1912–1914 | Russian Empire | 8 | (4) |
- * Club domestic league appearances and goals

Vasily Georgievich Zhitarev (Russian: Василий Георгиевич Житарев; January 1, 1891 (OS) / January 13, 1891 (NS) – April 13, 1961) was a Russian professional football player who competed in the 1912 Summer Olympics. He was a member of the Russian Olympic squad and played one match in the main tournament as well as one match in the consolation tournament.

== Career statistics ==
=== International ===
| National team | Year | Apps | Goals |
|---|---|---|---|
| Russian Empire | 1912 | 4 | 1 |
| Russian Empire | 1913 | 2 | 1 |
| Russian Empire | 1914 | 2 | 2 |
| Total | | 8 | 4 |

=== International goals ===
Scores and results list Russian Empire's goal tally first.

| No | Date | Venue | Opponent | Score | Result | Competition |
|---|---|---|---|---|---|---|
| 1. | 3 July 1912 | Tranebergs Idrottsplats, Stockholm, Sweden | Norway | 1–? | 1–2 | Friendly |
| 2. | 4 May 1913 | Sokolniki Park, Moscow, Russian Empire | Sweden | 1–3 | 1–4 | Friendly |
| 3. | 5 July 1914 | Stockholm Olympic Stadium, Stockholm, Sweden | Sweden | 1–0 | 2–2 | Friendly |
| 4. | 5 July 1914 | Stockholm Olympic Stadium, Stockholm, Sweden | Sweden | 2–0 | 2–2 | Friendly |

== See also ==
- Football at the 1912 Summer Olympics
