= Aleksandr Krotov (footballer, born 1895) =

Russian footballer

Personal information
- Full name: Aleksandr Ivanovich Krotov
- Date of birth: 1895
- Date of death: 1959 (aged 63–64)
- Positions: Striker; midfielder

Senior career*
Years	Team	Apps	(Gls)
1913–1922	KS Orekhovo Orekhovo-Zuyevo		
1923	CPKFK		
1923–1925	Krasnoye Orekhovo Orekhovo-Zuyevo		

International career
1914	Russian Empire	1	(1)
- * Club domestic league appearances and goals

Aleksandr Ivanovich Krotov (Russian: Александр Иванович Кротов; 1895–1959) was an association football player.

== International career ==
Krotov played his only game for Russia on 12 July 1914 in a friendly against Norway, scoring a goal in a 1:1 draw.
