= Aleksei Uversky =

Russian footballer

Personal information
- Full name: Aleksei Ivanovich Uversky
- Date of birth: 12 February 1886 (NS)
- Place of birth: Saint Petersburg, Russia
- Date of death: 1942 (age 55-56)
- Place of death: Leningrad, USSR
- Position: Midfielder

Senior career*
Years	Team	Apps	(Gls)
1906	Natsionaly Saint Petersburg		
1907–1913	Sport Saint Petersburg		

International career
1912	Russia	2	(0)
- * Club domestic league appearances and goals

Aleksei Ivanovich Uversky (Russian: Алексей Иванович Уверский) (12 February 1886(NS) – 1942) was an association football player.

He was born in St Petersburg, illegitimate son of a peasant woman, Euphrosyne Petrovna Lyarskaya and adopted in 1889 by merchant Ivan Osipovich Uversky whose patronymic he took.

Uversky made his debut for Russia on July 1, 1912, in a 1912 Olympics game against Germany.

He was also a keen boxer.

He died during World War II as a civilian during the Siege of Leningrad, reportedly in hospital from wounds received serving on the frontline.
