= Andrei Akimov =

Russian footballer (1890–1916)

Personal information
- Full name: Andrei Aleksandrovich Akimov
- Date of birth: 30 September 1890
- Place of birth: Nikolskoye, Vladimir Governorate, Russian Empire
- Date of death: 1916 (aged 25–26)
- Position: Midfielder

Senior career*
Years	Team	Apps	(Gls)
1907–1908	OKS Orekhovo-Zuyevo		
1909–1914	Klub Sporta Orekhovo Orekhovo-Zuyevo		

International career
1912–1913	Russian Empire	4	(1)
- * Club domestic league appearances and goals

Andrei Akimov
- Military career
- Allegiance: Russian Empire
- Branch: (Russian Empire) Russian Imperial Army
- Service years: 1914–1916
- Conflicts: World War I

Andrei Aleksandrovich Akimov (Russian: Андре́й Алекса́ндрович Аки́мов) (18 September 1890 (OS)/30 September 1890 (NS) – 1916) was a Russian football player who died during World War I. He was serving as a lieutenant when he died.

== International career ==
Akimov made his debut for the Russian Empire on June 30, 1912, in a 1912 Olympics match against Finland, and scored a goal in that game.

== See also ==
- List of Olympians killed in World War I
