= Jakob Swatosch =

Austrian footballer

Personal information
- Date of birth: 19 April 1891
- Place of birth: Wien, Austria-Hungary
- Date of death: 14 May 1971 (aged 80)
- Position: Midfielder

International career
Years	Team	Apps	(Gls)
1911–1914	Austria	3	(0)

Jakob Swatosch (19 April 1891 – 14 May 1971) was an Austrian footballer. He played in three matches for the Austria national football team from 1911 to 1914. He was also part of Austria's squad for the football tournament at the 1912 Summer Olympics, but he did not play in any matches.
