= Gustav Unfried =

German footballer

Personal information
- Date of birth: 24 March 1889
- Date of death: 13 September 1917 (aged 28)
- Position: Midfielder

Senior career*
Years	Team	Apps	(Gls)
- BFC Preussen

International career
1910	Germany	1	(0)
- * Club domestic league appearances and goals

Gustav Unfried (24 March 1889 – 13 September 1917) was a German international footballer.
