= Vadim Filippov =

Russian footballer

Personal information
- Full name: Vadim Viktorovich Filippov
- Date of birth: 8 March 1983 (age 43)
- Height: 1.70 m (5 ft 7 in)
- Positions: Defender; midfielder

Senior career*
Years	Team	Apps	(Gls)
2000	FC Metallurg Krasnoyarsk	0	(0)
2001	FC Chkalovets-Olimpik Novosibirsk	0	(0)
2001	FC Zvezda Irkutsk	4	(0)
2002–2004	FC Metallurg Krasnoyarsk	49	(3)
2005–2006	FC Sibiryak Bratsk	58	(0)
2008	FC Sibiryak Bratsk	17	(0)
2009	FC Amur Blagoveshchensk	20	(0)
- * Club domestic league appearances and goals

Vadim Viktorovich Filippov (Russian: Вадим Викторович Филиппов; born 8 March 1983) is a former Russian professional football player.

== Club career ==
He played in the Russian Football National League for FC Metallurg Krasnoyarsk in 2002.
