= Filipovo =

Filipovo may refer to:

- Filipovo, Blagoevgrad Province, a village in Bulgaria
- Filipovo, Haskovo Province, a village in Bulgaria
- Filipovo, former name of Bački Gračac, a village in West Bačka District, Serbia
