= Vasily Butusov =

Russian footballer

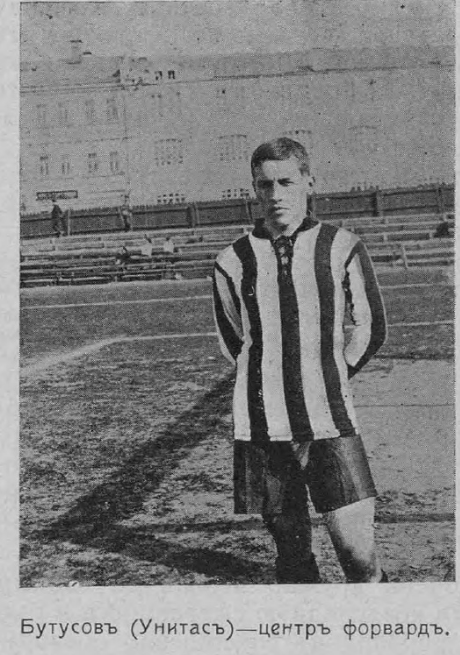

Personal information
- Full name: Vasily Pavlovich Butusov
- Date of birth: 7 February 1892
- Place of birth: Saint Petersburg, Russian Empire
- Date of death: 28 September 1971 (aged 79)
- Place of death: Leningrad, USSR
- Position: Striker

Senior career*
Years	Team	Apps	(Gls)
1909–1910	Viktoriya St. Petersburg		
1911–1922	Unitas St. Petersburg		
1923–1926	Spartak Vyborzhsky Rayon St. Petersburg		

International career
1912–1913	Russian Empire	5	(1)
- * Club domestic league appearances and goals

Vasily Pavlovich Butusov (Russian: Василий Павлович Бутусов; 26 January 1892 (OS)/7 February 1892 (NS) – 28 September 1971) was a Russian amateur association football player who competed in the 1912 Summer Olympics.

He was a member of the Russian Olympic squad and played one match in the main tournament and one match in the consolation tournament. He scored the only goal for Russia in this competition. This was also the first international game for Russia, so he became the first goal scorer for Russia.

Butusov was born in Myshkin, Yaroslavl province and died in Saint Petersburg. He was the brother of Mikhail Butusov.
