= Oliver Pötschke =

German–Filipino footballer

Personal information
- Date of birth: 13 February 1987 (age 39)
- Place of birth: Berlin, West Germany
- Height: 1.80 m (5 ft 11 in)
- Position: Centre-back

Youth career
- Hertha BSC

Senior career*
Years	Team	Apps	(Gls)
2010–2013	BFC Preussen	73	(4)
2013–2015	VfB Concordia Britz	46	(9)
2015–2016	Mariendorfer SV	25	(0)
2016–2018	TSV Mariendorf 1897	39	(1)

International career^{‡}
2011	Philippines	3	(0)
- * Club domestic league appearances and goals as of 16 June 2018. ‡ National team caps and goals as of 08:20, 8 November 2014 (UTC)

Oliver Pötschke (born 13 February 1987) is a retired footballer who played as a centre-back. Born and raised in Germany, he represented the Philippines internationally.

== Early life ==
Pötschke was born and raised in Berlin to a German father and a Filipina mother.

== Club career ==
Pötschke belonged to the Hertha BSC youth rank for six years, being in one of them a teammate of both Jérôme and Kevin-Prince Boateng.
