= Leonid Smirnov (footballer) =

Russian footballer (1889–1980)

Personal information
- Full name: Leonid Sergeyevich Smirnov
- Date of birth: 1889
- Place of birth: Moscow, Russia
- Date of death: 1980 (aged 90–91)
- Position: Striker

Senior career*
Years	Team	Apps	(Gls)
1905–1908	Bykovo Moscow		
1909–1910	SKS Moscow		
1911–1914	Union Moscow		
1918–1922	Union Moscow		

International career
1912	Russia	2	(0)
- * Club domestic league appearances and goals

Leonid Sergeyevich Smirnov (Russian: Леонид Серге́евич Смирнов; 1889 in Moscow – 1980) was an association football player. Smirnov made his debut for the Russian Empire on July 3, 1912, in a friendly against Norway. He was selected for the 1912 Olympics squad but did not play in any games at the tournament.
