= Mikhail Yakovlev (footballer, born 1892) =

Russian footballer (1893–1942)

Personal information
- Full name: Mikhail Vasilyevich Yakovlev
- Date of birth: 12 July 1893
- Date of death: 1942 (aged 48-49)
- Positions: Defender; midfielder

Senior career*
| Years | Team | Apps | (Gls) |
| 1911 | Merkur St. Petersburg | | |
| 1912–1916 | Unitas St. Petersburg | | |

International career
| 1912–1913 | Russian Empire | 3 | (0) |
- * Club domestic league appearances and goals

Mikhail Vasilyevich Yakovlev (Russian: Михаил Васильевич Яковлев) (12 July 1893–1942) was an association football player. Yakovlev made his debut for Russia on July 1, 1912 in a 1912 Olympics game against Germany. He was killed as a civilian in the Siege of Leningrad during World War II.
