= Aleksei Filippov (footballer, born 1975) =

Russian footballer

Personal information
- Full name: Aleksei Aleksandrovich Filippov
- Date of birth: 2 March 1975 (age 51)
- Height: 1.82 m (5 ft 11 1/2 in)
- Position: Defender

Senior career*
| Years | Team | Apps | (Gls) |
| 1994–2005 | FC Druzhba Maykop | 364 | (4) |
| 2007–2009 | FC Druzhba Maykop | 63 | (0) |
- * Club domestic league appearances and goals

Aleksei Aleksandrovich Filippov (Russian: Алексей Александрович Филиппов; born 2 March 1975) is a former Russian professional football player.

== Club career ==
He played 5 seasons in the Russian Football National League for FC Druzhba Maykop. Filippov is Druzhba's all-time leader in matches played in the Russian First Division with 253.
