= Lev Favorsky =

Russian footballer

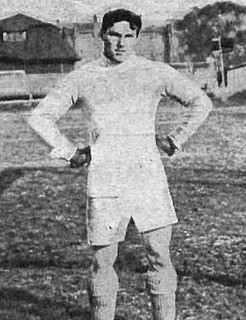
- Favorsky in 1913

Personal information
- Full name: Lev Ivanovich Favorsky
- Date of birth: 1893
- Date of death: 1969 (aged 75–76)
- Position: Goalkeeper

Senior career*
Years	Team	Apps	(Gls)
1910–1912	SKS Moscow		

International career
1912	Russian Empire	3	(−20)
- * Club domestic league appearances and goals

Lev Ivanovich Favorsky (Russian: Лев Иванович Фаворский) (1893–1969) was a Russian football player, playing as goalkeeper. Favorsky made his debut for the Russian Empire on 30 June 1912 in a 1912 Olympics game against Finland. He let in 16 goals in the next Olympic game against Germany which Russia lost 0:16.
