= Aleksandr Filippov (footballer) =

Russian footballer

Personal information
- Full name: Aleksandr Ilyich Filippov
- Date of birth: 1892
- Place of birth: Moscow, Russian Empire
- Date of death: 1962 (aged 69–70)
- Place of death: Moscow, Soviet Union
- Position: Striker

Senior career*
Years	Team	Apps	(Gls)
1910–1914	KFS Moscow		

International career
1912–1914	Russian Empire	3	(0)
- * Club domestic league appearances and goals

Aleksandr Ilyich Filippov (Russian: Алекса́ндр Ильи́ч Фили́ппов; 1892–1962) was an association football player. Filippov made his debut for the Russian Empire on 30 June 1912 in a 1912 Olympics game against Finland.
