= Sergei Filippov (footballer, born 1967) =

Russian footballer

Personal information
- Full name: Sergei Aleksandrovich Filippov
- Date of birth: 29 January 1967 (age 59)
- Height: 1.73 m (5 ft 8 in)
- Position: Defender

Youth career
- FC Torpedo Moscow

Senior career*
Years	Team	Apps	(Gls)
1984–1985	FC Torpedo Moscow	0	(0)
1986–1990	FC Torpedo Ryazan	170	(1)
1991–1994	FC Rostselmash Rostov-on-Don	94	(2)
1992–1993	→ FC Rostselmash-2 Rostov-on-Don	9	(0)
1995–2001	FC Agrokomplekt Ryazan	215	(3)
- * Club domestic league appearances and goals

Sergei Aleksandrovich Filippov (Russian: Сергей Александрович Филиппов; born 29 January 1967) is a former Russian football player.

== Club career ==
He made his Russian Premier League debut for FC Rostselmash Rostov-on-Don on 29 March 1992 in a game against FC Shinnik Yaroslavl. He also played in the RPL for Rostselmash in 1993.
