= Igor Filippov (painter) =

Igor Filippov (born 24 June 1961) is a painter from Sevastopol, Ukraine. Filippov has exhibited his works at many museums and festivals in Europe (Russia, Ukraine, Norway, Spain, Germany, France) and the United States. He was also a professor of art at the Municipal Art School, Severodvinsk, Russia (1990–2003). The general theme of his work is "myths of different cultures."

== Career ==
- School of Art at University of Education, St. Petersburg, Russia, 1986–1991, MFA
- Municipal Art Studio, Severodvinsk, Russia (1990–2003)
- Union of Arts of Russia (2000)
- Member of International Association of Art (2000)
- Association Internationale Des Arts Plastiques-IAA AIAP UNESCO (2000)
