= Otto Thiel =

German footballer

Personal information
- Date of birth: 23 November 1891
- Date of death: 10 July 1913 (aged 21)

International career
Years	Team	Apps	(Gls)
1912	Germany	1	(0)

Otto Thiel (23 November 1891 – 10 July 1913) was a German amateur footballer who played as a forward and competed in the 1912 Summer Olympics. He was a member of the German Olympic squad and played one match in the consolation tournament.
