= Fyodor Rimsha =

Russian footballer

Personal information
- Full name: Fyodor Mikhailovich Rimsha
- Date of birth: 1891
- Place of birth: Moscow, Russian Empire
- Date of death: 1942 (aged 50–51)
- Place of death: Leningrad, Soviet Union
- Position: Defender

Senior career*
Years	Team	Apps	(Gls)
1910	SKS Moscow		
1911	MKL Moscow		
1912	SKS Moscow		
1913	Union Moscow		

International career
1912	Russian Empire	3	(0)
- * Club domestic league appearances and goals

Fyodor Mikhailovich Rimsha (Russian: Фёдор Михайлович Римша) (born in 1891; died in 1942) was an association football player. Fyodor, Olympics participant, died in 1942 in Leningrad during the siege of the city in World War II.

Rimsha made his debut for Russian Empire on July 1, 1912 in a 1912 Olympics game against Germany.
