= Sergei Filippov (footballer, born 1892) =

Russian footballer

Personal information
- Full name: Sergei Pavlovich Filippov
- Date of birth: 24 July 1891 (NS)
- Place of birth: St Petersburg, Russian Empire
- Date of death: July 1942 (age 50-51)
- Place of death: Leningrad, USSR
- Position: Striker

Senior career*
Years	Team	Apps	(Gls)
1911–1923	Kolomyagi St. Petersburg		
1924	Leningradsky Uyezd Leningrad		
1925–1926	Spartak Petrogradsky Rayon Leningrad		
1927	V.I. Lenin Stadium Leningrad		

International career
1912	Russia	2	(0)
- * Club domestic league appearances and goals

Sergei Pavlovich Filippov (Russian: Серге́й Павлович Филиппов) (24 July 1891 (NS)- July 1942) was an association football player. He was killed during World War II, a civilian casualty of the Siege of Leningrad.

== Honours ==
- Russia Champion: 1912.

== International career ==
Filippov made his debut for Russia on 30 June 1912 in the 1912 Olympics against Finland.
