= List of Norway international footballers (2–9 caps) =

The Norway national football team represents Norway in international association football. It is fielded by The Football Association of Norway, NFF, the governing body of football in Norway, and competes as a member of the Union of European Football Associations (UEFA), which encompasses the countries of Europe. Norway competed for the first time on 12 July 1908, in a match the team lost 3–11 against Sweden.

Norway have competed in numerous competitions, and all players who have played between two and nine matches, either as a member of the starting eleven or as a substitute, are listed below. Each player's details include his usual playing position while with the team, the number of caps earned and goals scored in all international matches, and details of the first and most recent matches played in. The names are initially ordered by number of caps (in descending order), then by date of debut, then by alphabetical order. All statistics are correct up to 26 June 2026.

== Key ==
Player
This colour background and the * symbol indicate that the player was active at club level as at the date specified above.

Positions key
Pre-1960s		1960s–	
GK	Goalkeeper		
FB	Full back	DF	Defender
HB	Half back	MF	Midfielder
FW	Forward		

Position
Playing positions are listed according to the tactical formations that were employed at the time. Thus the change in the names of defensive and midfield positions reflects the tactical evolution that occurred from the 1960s onwards.
Caps and goals
Caps and goals comprise those in the FIFA World Cup and UEFA European Championship, their associated qualification matches and international friendly tournaments and matches.

== Players ==
Norway national football team players with 2 to 9 caps
Player	Pos.	Caps	Goals	Debut		Last or most recent match		Refs.
Player	Pos.	Caps	Goals	Date	Opponent	Date	Opponent	Refs.
David Andersen	FW	9	0	3 November 1912	Sweden	7 October 1917	Denmark	
John Johnsen	FB	9	0	27 June 1920	Sweden	24 September 1922	Sweden	
Jean-Louis Bretteville	HB	9	0	23 August 1924	Finland	5 July 1936	Sweden	
Arne Møller	HB	9	1	23 August 1924	Finland	26 June 1927	Sweden	
Gunnar Christensen	GK	9	0	29 May 1927	Denmark	23 September 1928	Germany	
Gustav Rehn	FB	9	0	9 September 1945	Denmark	5 October 1947	Sweden	
Per Bjørnø	FB	9	0	8 July 1949	Finland	15 May 1951	England	
Tore Børrehaug	DF	9	0	15 May 1963	Poland	27 October 1971	Hungary	
Arild Gulden	MF	9	0	4 June 1963	Scotland	26 September 1965	Denmark	
Svein Bjørn Olsen	GK	9	0	9 June 1968	Poland	26 September 1971	Denmark	
Tor Fuglset	FW	9	2	13 September 1970	Sweden	1 November 1972	Netherlands	
Tore Antonsen	GK	9	0	17 September 1972	Sweden	31 October 1981	Hungary	
Ståle Stensaas	DF	9	1	24 January 2001	South Korea	20 April 2005	Estonia	
Jo Tessem	MF	9	0	28 February 2001	Northern Ireland	18 February 2004	Northern Ireland	
Petter Vaagan Moen	MF	9	1	25 January 2006	Mexico	9 February 2011	Poland	
Morten Moldskred	FW	9	1	5 September 2009	Iceland	9 February 2011	Poland	
Jonathan Parr	DF	9	0	29 May 2010	Montenegro	6 February 2013	Ukraine	
Marcus Pedersen *	FW	9	1	8 January 2013	South Africa	15 November 2015	Hungary	
Thelo Aasgaard *	MF	9	6	22 March 2025	Moldova	26 June 2026	France	
Erling Maartmann	HB / FW	8	0	17 September 1911	Sweden	27 June 1915	Sweden	
Rolf Maartmann	HB / FW	8	2	17 September 1911	Sweden	27 June 1915	Sweden	
Ragnvald Smedvik	FW	8	0	28 June 1914	Sweden	15 October 1916	Denmark	
Axel Berg	MF	8	2	18 October 1959	Sweden	1 June 1961	Turkey	
Ole Stavrum	FW	8	2	1 July 1964	Switzerland	14 August 1966	Finland	
Sten Glenn Håberg	MF	8	0	24 September 1986	East Germany	2 May 1989	Poland	
Børre Meinseth	MF	8	0	12 August 1987	Sweden	26 April 1988	Sweden	
Simen Agdestein	FW	8	1	19 October 1988	Italy	5 September 1989	France	
Thomas Pereira	DF	8	0	18 January 1997	South Korea	28 January 2003	Oman	
Daniel Berg Hestad	MF	8	0	22 April 1998	Denmark	28 January 2003	Oman	
Andreas Lund	FW	8	4	20 May 1999	Jamaica	4 February 2000	Sweden	
Alexander Aas	DF	8	1	24 January 2001	South Korea	28 January 2004	Singapore	
Erik Nevland	FW	8	0	6 June 2001	Belarus	11 February 2009	Germany	
Frode Kippe	DF	8	0	28 January 2003	Oman	6 February 2008	Wales	
Hassan El Fakiri	DF / MF	8	0	18 February 2004	Northern Ireland	1 March 2006	Senegal	
Anders Konradsen	MF	8	1	14 November 2012	Hungary	8 June 2015	Sweden	
Jørgen Skjelvik *	DF	8	0	15 November 2013	Denmark	18 November 2020	Austria	
Egil Selvik *	GK	8	0	7 September 2023	Jordan	26 June 2026	France	
Harald Johansen	HB	7	0	12 July 1908	Sweden	1 July 1912	Austria	
Halfdan Ditlev-Simonsen	FW	7	4	3 November 1912	Sweden	15 October 1916	Denmark	
Arnt Simensen	GK	7	0	25 May 1921	Finland	16 September 1923	Sweden	
Arvid Lindberg	FB	7	0	15 June 1924	Germany	29 May 1927	Denmark	
Birger Steen	HB	7	3	10 October 1926	Poland	8 June 1934	Austria	
Bjarne Pettersen	HB	7	0	27 September 1931	Sweden	24 September 1933	Sweden	
Gunnar Hansen	FB	7	0	24 July 1947	Iceland	26 November 1950	Republic of Ireland	
Willy Fossli	FW	7	0	22 November 1953	West Germany	22 May 1957	Bulgaria	
Per Ljostveit	HB	7	1	30 May 1954	Austria	30 May 1956	Poland	
Arne Winther	DF	7	0	25 September 1955	Sweden	11 June 1962	Denmark	
Jack Kramer	DF	7	0	6 November 1960	Republic of Ireland	11 November 1964	France	
Isak Arne Refvik	FW / MF	7	0	9 May 1979	Portugal	10 August 1983	Romania	
Georg Hammer	DF	7	3	16 May 1979	Republic of Ireland	14 November 1979	West Germany	
Torbjørn Svendsen	MF	7	0	16 May 1979	Republic of Ireland	26 September 1979	West Germany	
Jan Kristian Fjærestad	FW	7	1	12 August 1987	Sweden	28 July 1988	Brazil	
Bengt Sæternes	FW	7	0	22 May 2002	Iceland	24 May 2005	Costa Rica	
Marius Johnsen	DF	7	0	24 May 2005	Costa Rica	7 February 2007	Croatia	
Anders Rambekk	DF	7	0	1 June 2006	South Korea	7 February 2007	Croatia	
Espen Bugge Pettersen	GK	7	0	29 May 2010	Montenegro	2 June 2012	Iceland	
Harmeet Singh	MF	7	0	15 January 2012	Denmark	12 November 2014	Estonia	
Felix Horn Myhre *	MF	7	2	6 September 2024	Kazakhstan	31 March 2026	Switzerland	
Hans Endrerud	FW	6	1	12 July 1908	Sweden	1 July 1912	Austria	
Einar Baastad	FB	6	0	11 September 1910	Sweden	8 June 1913	Sweden	
Einar Hansen	HB	6	0	3 November 1912	Sweden	15 October 1916	Denmark	
Arne Andersen	FW	6	4	31 August 1920	Italy	29 May 1927	Denmark	
Reidar Høilund	FB	6	0	19 June 1921	Sweden	16 September 1923	Sweden	
Oscar Thorstensen	HB	6	0	15 June 1924	Germany	12 June 1929	Netherlands	
Alf Flinth	FB	6	0	23 August 1924	Finland	26 June 1927	Sweden	
Ingar Pedersen	FB	6	0	23 October 1927	Germany	23 September 1928	Germany	
Sten Moe	HB	6	4	23 September 1928	Germany	18 June 1936	Switzerland	
Finn Johannesen	HB	6	3	6 September 1931	Finland	28 May 1933	Wales	
Ragnar Pedersen	FW	6	3	5 June 1932	Estonia	24 September 1933	Sweden	
Jørgen Hval	FW	6	0	5 November 1933	Germany	7 November 1937	Ireland	
William Danielsen	FW	6	1	8 June 1934	Austria	13 June 1937	Denmark	
Hjalmar Andresen	FB	6	0	3 September 1939	Finland	24 December 1948	Egypt	
Knut Osnes	FW	6	5	16 June 1946	Denmark	5 October 1947	Sweden	
Willy Andresen	FW	6	4	18 May 1949	England	26 November 1950	Republic of Ireland	
Karl Skifjeld	FW	6	0	19 June 1949	Yugoslavia	26 July 1951	Iceland	
Ove Ødegaard	HB	6	2	10 June 1952	Finland	4 November 1959	Netherlands	
Willy Aronsen	GK	6	0	4 July 1954	Iceland	12 June 1955	Romania	
Svein Bredo Østlien	MF	6	0	1 July 1964	Switzerland	23 June 1968	Denmark	
Pål Sæthrang	MF	6	1	24 September 1967	Denmark	13 November 1969	Guatemala	
Steinar Pettersen	MF / FW	6	0	23 June 1968	Denmark	23 February 1972	Israel	
Jan Rodvang	DF	6	0	18 July 1968	Iceland	8 May 1969	Mexico	
Jan Anders Hovdan	DF	6	0	25 July 1973	North Korea	3 November 1973	Luxembourg	
Erik Johannessen	GK	6	0	15 May 1975	Finland	17 July 1975	Iceland	
Frode Larsen	MF	6	0	30 June 1975	Sweden	24 September 1975	Soviet Union	
Henning Bjarnøy	MF	6	1	26 October 1983	Finland	20 December 1984	Egypt	
Carsten Bachke	MF	6	0	12 August 1987	Soviet Union	28 July 1988	Brazil	
Einar Rossbach	GK	6	0	7 November 1990	Tunisia	11 August 1993	Faroe Islands	
Erik Holtan	GK	6	0	20 November 2002	Austria	18 February 2004	Northern Ireland	
Pål André Helland	MF	6	1	8 June 2015	Sweden	8 October 2016	Azerbaijan	
Gustav Valsvik *	DF	6	0	26 March 2017	Northern Ireland	11 November 2017	Macedonia	
Hugo Vetlesen *	MF	6	1	20 November 2022	Finland	10 October 2024	Slovenia	
Kristian Krefting	HB	5	0	17 September 1911	Sweden	1 July 1912	Austria	
Olav Ditlev-Simonsen	HB	5	0	19 September 1915	Denmark	15 October 1916	Denmark	
Emil Hansen	FB	5	0	25 June 1916	Denmark	7 October 1917	Denmark	
Yngvar Tørnros	FB	5	0	25 June 1916	Denmark	15 October 1916	Denmark	
Bjarne Johnsen	FW	5	3	17 June 1923	Finland	4 November 1923	Germany	
Egil Jacobsen	HB	5	1	30 September 1923	Denmark	30 October 1927	Denmark	
Hans Dahl	FW	5	0	15 June 1924	Germany	21 June 1925	Denmark	
Arvid Syrrist	FB	5	0	14 September 1924	Denmark	17 June 1932	Finland	
Thøger Nordbø	FB	5	0	3 June 1928	Finland	23 June 1935	Denmark	
Morten Pettersen	HB / FW	5	4	1 June 1930	Finland	18 June 1936	Switzerland	
Bjarne Rosén	FB	5	0	25 May 1931	Denmark	1 July 1934	Sweden	
Magdalon Monsen	FB	5	0	3 November 1935	Switzerland	17 September 1939	Sweden	
Torkild Andersen	FW	5	3	19 September 1937	Sweden	3 September 1939	Finland	
Lars Martinsen	FB	5	0	23 October 1938	Poland	17 September 1939	Sweden	
Einar Gundersen	FB	5	0	2 June 1939	Sweden	19 September 1948	Sweden	
Egil Jevanord	FB	5	0	21 October 1945	Sweden	24 July 1947	Iceland	
Knut Dahlen	FW	5	2	28 July 1946	Luxembourg	24 June 1953	Saar	
Thor Moxnes	HB	5	0	12 June 1948	Denmark	24 December 1948	Egypt	
Jann Sørdahl	FW	5	5	12 June 1948	Denmark	24 December 1948	Egypt	
Tore Nilsen	HB	5	0	30 May 1956	Poland	15 June 1958	Finland	
Hans Jakob Mathisen	DF	5	0	20 May 1959	Austria	1 July 1961	Soviet Union	
Sveinung Aarnseth	DF	5	0	20 September 1964	Sweden	7 November 1965	Yugoslavia	
Robert Nilsson	MF	5	0	20 July 1970	Iceland	26 September 1971	Denmark	
Arild Hetleøen	DF	5	0	23 September 1970	Denmark	9 June 1971	Bulgaria	
Øystein Wormdal	DF	5	0	23 May 1974	East Germany	14 November 1979	West Germany	
Trygve Johannessen	MF	5	0	24 September 1975	Soviet Union	26 October 1979	Finland	
Stein Gran	MF	5	0	9 August 1979	Finland	2 August 1984	Qatar	
Nils Ove Hellvik	FW	5	0	13 November 1982	Kuwait	18 November 1987	Turkey	
Jan Halvor Halvorsen	DF	5	0	15 November 1989	Scotland	31 October 1990	Cameroon	
Dag Riisnæs	MF	5	0	6 June 1990	Denmark	25 September 1991	Czechoslovakia	h
Geirmund Brendesæter	DF	5	0	11 August 1993	Faroe Islands	29 November 1995	Trinidad and Tobago	
Runar Berg	MF	5	0	15 January 1994	United States	15 November 2003	Spain	
Geir Frigård	FW	5	1	15 January 1994	United States	12 October 1994	Netherlands	
Thomas Gill	GK	5	0	22 January 1997	New Zealand	25 March 1998	Belgium	
Jonny Hanssen	DF	5	0	18 January 1997	South Korea	28 January 2003	Oman	
Alex Valencia	MF	5	0	15 August 2001	Turkey	29 January 2006	United States	
Erlend Hanstveit	DF	5	0	28 January 2004	Singapore	29 January 2006	United States	
Ragnvald Soma	DF	5	0	18 August 2004	Belgium	28 January 2005	Jordan	
Trond Erik Bertelsen	DF	5	0	25 January 2006	Mexico	28 March 2009	South Africa	
Kim André Madsen	DF	5	0	10 August 2011	Czech Republic	11 June 2013	Macedonia	
Yann-Erik de Lanlay *	MF	5	1	8 January 2013	South Africa	27 August 2014	United Arab Emirates	
Sten Grytebust *	GK	5	0	11 June 2013	Macedonia	7 June 2019	Romania	
Per-Egil Flo *	DF	5	0	27 August 2014	United Arab Emirates	13 June 2017	Sweden	
Sigurd Rosted *	DF	5	1	26 March 2018	Albania	19 November 2018	Cyprus	
Henry Reinholdt	HB	4	0	16 June 1912	Sweden	26 October 1913	Sweden	
Per Haraldsen	FB	4	0	23 June 1912	Hungary	15 October 1916	Denmark	
Sigurd Rasmussen	FB	4	0	3 November 1912	Sweden	16 September 1917	Sweden	
Andreas Johansen	FB	4	0	14 September 1924	Denmark	23 September 1928	Germany	
Gunnar Dahl	FW	4	1	21 September 1924	Sweden	30 October 1927	Denmark	
Trygve Aasen	FB	4	0	19 September 1926	Denmark	26 June 1927	Sweden	
Odd Hoel	FW	4	4	25 September 1932	Denmark	22 September 1935	Sweden	
Oddmund Andersen	FB	4	0	1 November 1936	Netherlands	8 July 1946	Denmark	
Paul Sæthrang	FW	4	4	23 October 1938	Poland	24 July 1947	Iceland	
Hans Andersen	FW	4	1	11 September 1949	Denmark	26 July 1951	Iceland	
Øivind Johannessen	GK	4	0	2 October 1949	Sweden	5 October 1952	Sweden	
Åge Spydevold	FB	4	0	6 June 1951	Netherlands	4 November 1959	Netherlands	
Arne Høivik	HB	4	1	16 August 1951	Finland	2 July 1959	Denmark	
Yngve Karlsen	FB	4	0	19 May 1953	England	3 November 1957	Bulgaria	
Per Knudsen	HB	4	0	11 September 1955	Denmark	30 May 1956	Poland	
Knut Sandengen	HB / FW	4	2	13 June 1956	West Germany	26 August 1956	Finland	
Roald Muggerud	MF	4	0	13 August 1958	East Germany	26 May 1960	Denmark	
Åge Sørensen	MF	4	1	21 August 1959	Iceland	5 November 1961	Malta	
Oddvar Richardsen	FW	4	0	16 May 1961	Mexico	14 August 1963	Sweden	
Tom Johannessen	DF	4	0	17 September 1961	Denmark	5 November 1961	Malta	
Kai Sjøberg	MF	4	1	27 May 1965	Luxembourg	12 November 1967	Portugal	
Sven Otto Birkeland	MF	4	1	3 September 1967	Sweden	1 November 1972	Netherlands	
Thorodd Presberg	FW / MF	4	1	9 June 1968	Poland	13 May 1970	Czechoslovakia	
Inge Thun	GK	4	0	23 June 1968	Denmark	15 August 1974	Finland	
Reidar Goa	DF	4	0	13 May 1970	Czechoslovakia	9 June 1975	Yugoslavia	
Hans Edgar Paulsen	MF	4	2	17 June 1970	Finland	25 July 1973	North Korea	
Egil Olsen	MF	4	0	20 July 1970	Iceland	26 September 1971	Denmark	
Bjørn Tronstad	FW	4	0	19 May 1976	Iceland	25 August 1976	Denmark	
Ole Johnny Henriksen	FW	4	0	1 June 1977	Denmark	12 August 1981	Nigeria	
Geir Johansen	MF	4	0	19 May 1983	Denmark	12 November 1983	East Germany	
Arnt Kortgaard	MF	4	0	19 May 1983	Denmark	26 May 1987	Bulgaria	
Øivind Tomteberget	MF	4	0	15 June 1983	Finland	29 October 1983	East Germany	
Knut Torbjørn Eggen	DF	4	0	20 June 1984	Iceland	2 August 1984	Qatar	
André Krogsæter	FW	4	0	29 July 1984	Chile	17 April 1985	East Germany	
Ulf Moen	MF	4	0	26 September 1984	Denmark	1 May 1985	Republic of Ireland	
Arne Møller	DF	4	0	26 February 1986	Grenada	12 August 1987	Soviet Union	
Rune Richardsen	MF	4	0	14 October 1986	Soviet Union	26 August 1987	Switzerland	
Arnfinn Engerbakk	DF	4	0	26 May 1987	Bulgaria	18 November 1987	Turkey	
Trond Egil Soltvedt	MF	4	0	18 January 1997	South Korea	25 March 1998	Belgium	
Espen Baardsen	GK	4	0	6 September 1998	Latvia	31 January 2000	Iceland	
Alexander Ødegaard	MF	4	1	18 February 2004	Northern Ireland	16 November 2004	Australia	
Thomas Holm	MF	4	0	16 November 2004	Australia	28 January 2005	Jordan	
Øyvind Storflor	MF	4	0	22 January 2005	Kuwait	11 October 2013	Slovenia	
Lars Iver Strand	MF	4	0	22 January 2005	Kuwait	22 August 2007	Argentina	
John Anders Bjørkøy	MF	4	0	7 February 2007	Croatia	6 February 2008	Wales	
Vegar Eggen Hedenstad *	DF	4	0	15 January 2012	Denmark	6 February 2013	Ukraine	
Magnus Lekven	MF	4	0	15 January 2012	Denmark	11 June 2013	Macedonia	
Lars-Christopher Vilsvik *	DF	4	0	15 January 2012	Denmark	12 January 2013	Zambia	
Ruben Kristiansen *	DF	4	0	8 January 2013	South Africa	18 January 2014	Poland	
Fredrik Ulvestad *	MF	4	0	27 August 2014	United Arab Emirates	18 November 2020	Austria	
Anders Trondsen *	MF	4	0	29 May 2016	Portugal	14 November 2017	Slovakia	
Ola Brynhildsen *	FW	4	0	17 November 2022	Republic of Ireland	28 March 2023	Georgia	
Bård Finne *	FW	4	1	20 June 2023	Cyprus	16 November 2023	Faroe Islands	
Sondre Langås *	DF	4	0	9 September 2024	Austria	26 June 2026	France	
Jonas Aas	HB	3	0	26 October 1913	Sweden	19 September 1915	Denmark	
Alf Simensen	FW	3	0	26 May 1918	Sweden	6 June 1926	Finland	
Fritz Semb-Thorstvedt	HB	3	0	6 October 1918	Denmark	21 September 1919	Denmark	
Ellef Mohn	FB	3	0	31 August 1920	Italy	10 September 1922	Denmark	
Wilhelm Nielsen	HB	3	2	26 August 1922	Finland	7 June 1925	Finland	
Gudmund Fredriksen	FB	3	0	21 September 1924	Sweden	29 May 1927	Denmark	
Sigurd Andersen	FW	3	2	3 June 1928	Finland	17 June 1928	Denmark	
Kåre Kongsvik	HB	3	1	12 June 1929	Netherlands	2 November 1930	Germany	
Harald Pettersen	HB	3	1	1 June 1930	Finland	25 May 1931	Denmark	
Arthur Johansen	FB	3	0	21 September 1930	Denmark	27 September 1931	Sweden	
Harry Yven	FW	3	1	25 May 1931	Denmark	24 December 1948	Egypt	
Bernhard Lund	HB	3	0	5 November 1933	Germany	23 September 1934	Denmark	
Sverre Berglie	FW	3	5	8 June 1934	Austria	23 September 1934	Denmark	
Thorleif Svendsen	FW	3	2	8 June 1934	Austria	2 September 1934	Finland	
Birger Pedersen	HB	3	2	1 July 1934	Sweden	5 July 1936	Sweden	
Carl Jamissen	FW	3	1	8 September 1935	Finland	3 November 1935	Switzerland	
John Sveinsson	HB	3	1	21 October 1945	Sweden	15 May 1951	England	
Gunnar Andresen	HB / FW	3	0	26 June 1947	Finland	5 October 1952	Sweden	
Knut Andersen	FW	3	0	18 May 1949	England	27 June 1961	Finland	
Karsten Hansen	HB	3	0	15 August 1950	Luxembourg	19 October 1952	Denmark	
Tor Jevne	FW	3	2	10 June 1952	Finland	19 May 1953	England	
Leif Olsen	FW	3	0	24 June 1953	Saar	19 August 1953	West Germany	
Svein Bergersen	FB	3	0	12 June 1955	Romania	4 November 1959	Netherlands	
Per Tidemann	HB	3	0	24 June 1956	Denmark	26 August 1956	Finland	
Bjarne Hansen	FB	3	0	10 November 1957	Hungary	14 September 1958	Sweden	
Arnold Johannessen	FB	3	0	21 August 1959	Iceland	23 September 1959	Austria	
Einar Bruno Larsen	MF	3	1	21 August 1959	Iceland	1 July 1964	Switzerland	
Jan Aas	MF	3	0	26 August 1962	Finland	4 October 1972	Belgium	
Leif Eriksen	FW	3	1	13 May 1964	Republic of Ireland	18 August 1968	Finland	
Andreas Morisbak	DF	3	0	9 October 1968	Sweden	1 June 1969	Sweden	
Egil Austbø	DF	3	0	3 July 1969	Bermuda	30 October 1974	Yugoslavia	
Anbjørn Ekeland	DF	3	0	25 August 1971	Finland	26 September 1971	Denmark	
Terje Olsen	MF	3	0	23 February 1972	Israel	30 October 1974	Yugoslavia	
Johannes Vold	FW	3	1	6 June 1973	Republic of Ireland	25 July 1973	North Korea	
Torkild Brakstad	MF	3	0	15 August 1974	Finland	30 October 1974	Yugoslavia	
Erik Just-Olsen	MF	3	1	30 June 1975	Sweden	17 July 1975	Iceland	
Steinar Aase	FW	3	0	25 August 1976	Denmark	9 August 1978	Finland	
Geir Henæs	MF	3	0	16 May 1979	Republic of Ireland	9 August 1979	Finland	
Svein Gunnar Rein	MF	3	1	28 June 1979	Sweden	26 October 1979	Finland	
Jon Abrahamsen	GK	3	0	29 April 1981	Nigeria	2 July 1981	Finland	
Frode Holstad Hansen	GK	3	0	12 August 1981	Nigeria	12 May 1982	West Germany	
Bård Bjerkeland	DF	3	0	14 October 1986	Soviet Union	6 May 1987	Turkey	
Rune Tangen	DF	3	1	26 April 1988	Sweden	7 February 1990	Malta	
Claus Eftevaag	DF	3	0	7 November 1990	Tunisia	29 November 1995	Trinidad and Tobago	
Ulf Karlsen	DF	3	0	25 September 1991	Czechoslovakia	4 February 1992	Bermuda	
Mons Ivar Mjelde	FW	3	2	11 August 1993	Faroe Islands	22 July 1995	France	
Gunnar Aase	MF	3	1	29 March 1995	Luxembourg	29 November 1995	Trinidad and Tobago	
Stig Johansen	FW	3	0	18 January 1997	South Korea	25 January 1997	Australia	
Bjarte Lunde Aarsheim	MF	3	0	24 January 2001	South Korea	15 August 2001	Turkey	
Torjus Hansén	DF	3	0	20 November 2002	Austria	30 April 2003	Republic of Ireland	
Terje Skjeldestad	GK	3	0	22 January 2004	Sweden	28 January 2004	Singapore	
Roger Risholt	MF	3	0	22 January 2005	Kuwait	28 January 2005	Jordan	
Daniel Fredheim Holm	MF	3	0	28 March 2007	Turkey	19 November 2008	Ukraine	
Mustafa Abdellaoue	FW	3	0	15 January 2012	Denmark	21 January 2012	South Korea	
Steffen Hagen *	DF	3	0	18 January 2012	Thailand	27 August 2014	United Arab Emirates	
Fredrik Semb Berge	DF	3	0	8 January 2013	South Africa	14 August 2013	Sweden	
Johan Lædre Bjørdal	DF	3	0	6 September 2013	Cyprus	11 October 2013	Slovenia	
Fredrik Gulbrandsen *	FW	3	0	27 August 2014	United Arab Emirates	29 March 2016	Finland	
Martin Samuelsen *	MF	3	1	1 June 2016	Iceland	11 October 2016	San Marino	
Kristoffer Zachariassen *	MF	3	0	6 June 2021	Greece	20 November 2022	Finland	
Lasse Berg Johnsen *	MF	3	0	14 November 2024	Slovenia	9 June 2025	Estonia	
Macken Aas	FB	2	0	12 July 1908	Sweden	11 September 1910	Sweden	
Victor Nysted	HB	2	1	12 July 1908	Sweden	17 September 1911	Sweden	
Julius Clementz	GK	2	0	11 September 1910	Sweden	17 September 1911	Sweden	
Tormod Kjellsen	HB	2	0	11 September 1910	Sweden	14 September 1913	Russia	
Sverre Jensen	FB	2	0	1 June 1912	Austria	3 November 1912	Sweden	
Ragnar Halvorsen	HB	2	0	3 November 1912	Sweden	8 June 1913	Sweden	
Gustav Holm	HB	2	0	3 November 1912	Sweden	8 June 1913	Sweden	
Karl Poppe	FW	2	0	8 June 1913	Sweden	28 June 1914	Sweden	
Fritjof Tønnesen	FB	2	0	8 June 1913	Sweden	28 June 1914	Sweden	
Asbjørn Aamodt	GK	2	0	14 September 1913	Russia	25 October 1914	Sweden	
Wilhelm Hansen	FB	2	0	14 September 1913	Russia	25 October 1914	Sweden	
Carl Pedersen	HB	2	0	14 September 1913	Russia	26 October 1913	Sweden	
Olaf Ruud	HB	2	0	14 September 1913	Russia	26 October 1913	Sweden	
Sverre Andersen	FW	2	0	26 October 1913	Sweden	7 October 1917	Denmark	
Torkel Trædal	FW	2	0	12 July 1914	Russia	25 October 1914	Sweden	
Wilhelm Rønning	FB	2	0	27 June 1915	Sweden	7 October 1917	Denmark	
Rolf Semb-Thorstvedt	FW	2	0	27 June 1920	Sweden	31 August 1920	Italy	
Fridtjof Resberg	FW	2	1	19 June 1921	Sweden	10 September 1922	Denmark	
Martinius Kristoffersen	HB	2	0	2 October 1921	Denmark	17 June 1923	Finland	
Petter Pedersen	FB	2	0	17 June 1923	Finland	21 June 1923	Switzerland	
Sverre Eika	FB	2	0	28 October 1923	France	4 November 1923	Germany	
Erich Graff-Wang	HB	2	0	23 August 1924	Finland	14 September 1924	Denmark	
Bjarne Klavestad	GK	2	0	6 June 1926	Finland	9 June 1926	Sweden	
Erling Lunde	FB	2	0	29 May 1927	Denmark	23 September 1928	Germany	
Fredrik Hetty	FB	2	0	3 June 1928	Finland	7 June 1928	Sweden	
Kaare Lie	FW	2	0	17 June 1928	Denmark	12 June 1929	Netherlands	
Håkon Walde	FB	2	0	12 June 1929	Netherlands	5 June 1932	Estonia	
Erling Andersen	MF	2	3	18 June 1929	Finland	23 June 1929	Denmark	
Harald Gundersen	HB	2	0	29 September 1929	Sweden	3 November 1929	Netherlands	
Roy Fosdahl	GK	2	0	2 November 1930	Germany	2 September 1934	Finland	
Walter Wallenborg	HB	2	0	21 June 1931	Germany	23 September 1934	Denmark	
Håkon Johannessen	FB	2	0	28 May 1933	Wales	27 May 1937	Italy	
Didrik Christensen	FB	2	0	11 June 1933	Denmark	3 November 1933	Switzerland	
Josef Håkestad	FW	2	0	8 September 1935	Finland	22 September 1935	Sweden	
Fredrik Horn	FB	2	0	26 July 1936	Sweden	3 August 1936	Turkey	
Anker Kihle	GK	2	0	14 June 1939	Sweden	18 June 1939	Denmark	
Gunnar Andreassen	HB	2	0	17 September 1939	Sweden	26 August 1945	Denmark	
Willy Sundblad	FB	2	0	22 October 1939	Denmark	26 May 1948	Netherlands	
Thorleif Larsen	HB	2	0	26 August 1945	Denmark	9 September 1945	Denmark	
Kjell Moe	FW	2	1	26 August 1945	Denmark	9 September 1945	Denmark	
Reidar Olsen	HB	2	0	26 August 1945	Denmark	21 October 1945	Sweden	
Johan Saksvik	FB	2	0	5 September 1948	Finland	19 September 1948	Sweden	
Ewald Kihle	GK	2	0	15 May 1951	England	30 May 1951	Republic of Ireland	
Olav Førli	GK	2	0	24 June 1953	Saar	30 May 1954	Austria	
Roy Strandbakke	HB	2	0	27 September 1953	Netherlands	3 November 1957	Bulgaria	
Gunnar Arnesen	FW	2	0	19 May 1954	Scotland	4 November 1959	Netherlands	
Ragnar Rygel	DF / MF	2	0	7 June 1954	Sweden	7 November 1954	Republic of Ireland	
Petter Fauchald	HB	2	0	31 October 1954	Denmark	7 November 1954	Republic of Ireland	
Erik Engsmyr	HB	2	0	16 September 1956	Sweden	9 June 1960	Iceland	
Steinar Johannessen	FW	2	0	17 June 1959	Luxembourg	26 May 1960	Denmark	
Svein Weltz	GK	2	0	4 November 1959	Netherlands	26 May 1960	Denmark	
Per Martinsen	DF	2	0	3 July 1962	Malta	9 July 1962	Iceland	
Martin Kjølholdt	MF	2	0	8 August 1965	Finland	31 October 1965	Sweden	
Terje Gulbrandsen	MF	2	0	21 September 1969	Denmark	11 November 1969	Mexico	
Arnfinn Espeseth	MF	2	1	15 November 1970	Bulgaria	26 May 1971	Iceland	
Aasmund Sandland	MF	2	0	22 June 1971	West Germany	21 July 1971	England	
Inge Valen	MF	2	0	8 August 1974	Sweden	15 August 1974	Finland	
Arild Olsen	MF	2	0	24 March 1976	Republic of Ireland	16 May 1979	Republic of Ireland	
Boye Skistad	MF	2	0	16 June 1976	Sweden	24 June 1976	Denmark	
Yngve Andersen	MF	2	0	29 March 1978	Spain	21 May 1978	Republic of Ireland	
Frank Grønlund	DF	2	0	31 October 1981	Hungary	28 April 1982	Finland	
Tor Inge Smedås	DF	2	0	14 October 1986	Soviet Union	6 May 1987	Turkey	
Kai Lagesen	MF	2	0	8 November 1986	Switzerland	12 August 1987	Soviet Union	
Per Terje Markussen	MF	2	0	8 November 1986	Switzerland	6 May 1987	Turkey	
Øivind Husby	MF	2	0	26 May 1987	Bulgaria	26 August 1987	Switzerland	
Ulrich Møller	DF	2	0	23 September 1987	Iceland	28 October 1987	East Germany	
Tom Kåre Staurvik	MF	2	0	11 August 1993	Faroe Islands	19 January 1994	Costa Rica	
Bjørn Arild Levernes	MF	2	1	26 November 1995	Jamaica	29 November 1995	Trinidad and Tobago	
Arild Stavrum	FW	2	0	26 November 1995	Jamaica	29 November 1995	Trinidad and Tobago	
Dagfinn Enerly	MF	2	0	1 September 1996	Georgia	24 January 2001	South Korea	
Roger Helland	MF	2	0	18 January 1997	South Korea	22 January 1997	New Zealand	
Steinar Nilsen	DF	2	0	8 October 1997	Colombia	22 April 1998	Denmark	
Morten Bakke	GK	2	0	4 February 2000	Sweden	24 January 2001	South Korea	
Jan Frode Nornes	DF	2	0	4 February 2000	Sweden	28 January 2003	Oman	
Pål Strand	MF	2	0	1 September 2001	Poland	5 September 2001	Wales	
Tommy Berntsen	DF	2	0	21 August 2002	Netherlands	28 January 2004	Singapore	
Christer George	MF	2	0	26 January 2003	United Arab Emirates	28 January 2003	Oman	
Anders Stadheim	MF	2	1	22 January 2004	Sweden	28 January 2004	Singapore	
Espen Hoff	MF	2	0	25 January 2005	Bahrain	15 November 2006	Serbia	
Espen Søgård	MF	2	0	25 January 2005	Bahrain	28 January 2005	Jordan	
Espen Olsen	FW	2	0	25 January 2006	Mexico	29 January 2006	United States	
Knut Olav Rindarøy	DF	2	0	10 October 2009	South Africa	12 October 2010	Croatia	
Thomas Rogne	DF	2	0	29 February 2012	Northern Ireland	15 August 2012	Greece	
Mohammed Fellah	MF	2	0	8 January 2013	South Africa	12 January 2013	Zambia	
Jørgen Horn	DF	2	0	8 January 2013	South Africa	12 January 2013	Zambia	
Thomas Kind Bendiksen	MF	2	0	15 January 2014	Moldova	18 January 2014	Poland	
Abdisalam Ibrahim	MF	2	0	15 January 2014	Moldova	18 January 2014	Poland	
André Danielsen	MF	2	0	31 May 2014	Russia	27 August 2014	United Arab Emirates	
Ohi Omoijuanfo *	FW	2	1	13 June 2017	Sweden	17 November 2022	Republic of Ireland	
Ghayas Zahid *	MF	2	1	6 June 2018	Panama	18 November 2020	Austria	
Ruben Gabrielsen *	DF	2	0	18 November 2020	Austria	11 October 2021	Montenegro	
Marius Lode *	DF	2	0	24 March 2021	Gibraltar	13 November 2021	Latvia	
Jostein Gundersen *	DF	2	0	5 June 2024	Kosovo	9 September 2024	Austria	
Erik Botheim *	FW	2	0	8 June 2024	Denmark	22 March 2025	Moldova	
Aune Heggebø *	FW	2	0	9 September 2025	Moldova	14 October 2025	New Zealand	
Henrik Falchener *	DF	2	0	31 March 2026	Switzerland	26 June 2026	France	

== See also ==
- List of Norway international footballers, covering players with twenty-five or more caps
- List of Norway international footballers (10–24 caps)
- List of Norway international footballers with one cap
