= Deaths in March 1987 =

The following is a list of notable deaths in March 1987.

Entries for each day are listed alphabetically by surname. A typical entry lists information in the following sequence:

- Name, age, country of citizenship at birth, subsequent country of citizenship (if applicable), reason for notability, cause of death (if known), and reference.

== March 1987 ==
=== 1 ===
- Freddie Green, 75, American swing jazz guitarist, heart attack.
- Bertrand de Jouvenel, 83, French philosopher and political economist.
- Tony Kelly, 68, American basketball player.
- Roger Leigh-Wood, 80, English Olympic athlete (1928).
- Don MacBeth, 37, Canadian jockey, cancer.
- Vern Partlow, 76, American newspaper reporter and folk singer, blacklisted during McCarthy era, cancer.
- Wolfgang Seidel, 60, German Formula 1 racing driver, heart attack.
- Eddie Skinner, 78, American NASCAR racing driver.

=== 2 ===
- Ernest Holmes, 69, South African cricketer.
- Gord McFarlane, 85, Canadian ice hockey player.(Chicago Black Hawks).
- Mo Mozzali, 64, American baseball player, scout, and coach.
- Randolph Scott, 89, American film actor (The Last of the Mohicans), heart and lung ailments.
- Lolo Soetoro, 52, Indonesian geographer, stepfather of Barack Obama, liver failure.

=== 3 ===
- Con Hogan, 83, Australian rules footballer.
- Danny Kaye, 76, American singer, actor, dancer and comedian, internal bleeding and hepatitis.
- Balilla Lombardi, 70, Italian footballer.
- Keith Miller, 65, Australian rules footballer.
- LaFayette L. Patterson, 98, American politician, member of the United States House of Representatives (1928–1933).
- Cyril Pearl, 82, Australian journalist, author and television personality.
- Coby Ruskin, 75, American television director and actor.
- Rafael M. Salas, 58, Filipino head of United Nations Population Fund, heart attack.
- Hana Vítová, 73, Czech film actress.

=== 4 ===
- Georges Arnaud, 69, French author, heart attack.
- Bill Chaffey, 72, Australian soldier and politician, member of the New South Wales Legislative Assembly (1940–1973).
- Maria Jolas, 94, American pacifist, a founding member of Transition in Paris.
- Seibo Kitamura, 102, Japanese sculptor.
- Eliseo Moreno, 27, American spree killer, executed.

=== 5 ===
- Len Akin, 70, American NFL player (Chicago Bears).
- James W. Blanchard, 83, American submarine commander and rear admiral, respiratory arrest.
- John Brooke, 64, Northern Irish politician, Parliamentary Secretary to the Prime Minister of Northern Ireland.
- Albert Costain, 76, British politician, Member of Parliament.
- Abdulgani Dahiwala, 78, Indian Gujarati poet.
- Harry Dudkin, 78, American politician and judge, clerk of the New Jersey General Assembly, murdered.
- Andrey A. Fedorov, 78, Soviet biologist, botanist and taxonomist.
- Joe Purcell, 63, American politician, acting Governor of Arkansas.
- Don Yenko, 59, American car dealer and racecar driver, aeroplane crash.

=== 6 ===
- Inder Raj Anand, Indian film dialogue and screenwriter.
- Mel Boozer, 41, American university professor and LGBT activist, AIDS.
- Edward Carson, 67, British politician, Member of Parliament.
- Eddie Durham, 80, American jazz guitarist, trombonist and composer, fall.
- J. Spencer Trimingham, 82, English scholar on Islam in Africa.
- Edward Zorinsky, 58, American politician, U.S. Senator (since 1976), heart attack.

=== 7 ===
- Jan Britstra, 81, Dutch Olympic hurdler (1928).
- Yuri Chulyukin, 57, Soviet film director, actor and songwriter.
- Henri Decaë, 71, French cinematographer.
- Evelyn Dove, 85, British singer and actress, pneumonia.
- Paul R. Evans, 55, American-born furniture designer, sculptor and artist, heart attack.
- Alan Kuntz, 67, Canadian NHL player (New York Rangers).
- Waldo Salt, 72, American screenwriter (Midnight Cowboy, Coming Home), lung cancer.

=== 8 ===
- Erwin Jollasse, 95, Nazi German general, recipient of the Knight's Cross of the Iron Cross.
- Ede Szomjas, 72, Hungarian Olympic sports shooter (1960).
- Nils Wallin, 82, Swedish Olympic canoeist (1936).
- Victor Wells-Cole, 89, British army officer and cricketer.
- Iwao Yamawaki, 88, Japanese photographer and architect.

=== 9 ===
- Boris Andreyev, 81, Soviet Russian Olympic medalist shooter (1952).
- Zeke Bonura, 78, American Major League baseball player (Chicago White Sox).
- Ronald W. Clark, 70, British author, cerebral hemorrhage.
- Doug Davies, 87, Scottish rugby union player.
- Donald Jay Grout, 84, American musicologist, author of A Short History of Opera.
- Allan Jaffe, 51, American jazz tubist, cancer.
- Andrew Kayiira, 42, leader of the Uganda Freedom Movement, murdered.
- Yusuf al-Khal, 69, Lebanese-Syrian poet, journalist and publisher.
- Richard F. Kneip, 54, American diplomat and politician, governor of South Dakota, U.S. ambassador to Singapore, cancer.
- Bobby Locke, 69, South African professional golfer, meningitis.
- Miguel Palau, 85, Spanish Olympic long-distance runner (1924).
- John Keating Regan, 75, American district judge.
- Fred W. Thompson, 86, Canadian-American labour organizer and historian, member of Industrial Workers of the World.
- Arthur Tolcher, 64, British harmonica player.
- Gordon Tottle, 61, American ice hockey player.

=== 10 ===
- Colin Anderson, 74, Australian Olympic sports shooter (1956).
- Dwight Burney, 95, American politician, Governor of Nebraska.
- Robert Colby, 64, American songwriter, music publisher and theatrical producer ("Jilted"), cancer.
- George Glamack, 68, American professional basketballer (Rochester Royals).
- Jeannette Mirsky, 83, American writer.
- Daniel Morgan, 37, British private investigator, victim of unsolved murder.
- Johannes Quasten, 86, German Roman Catholic theologian.

=== 11 ===
- Karl Bohren, 84, American football player and coach.
- Joe Gladwin, 81, English actor (Coronation Street, Last of the Summer Wine), bronchial cancer.
- Fred Lucas, 84, American MLB player (Philadelphia Phillies).
- Bots Nekola, 80, American MLB player.

=== 12 ===
- Robert Barnes, 75, Irish cricketer and rugby union player.
- Jon R. Collins, 63, American judge, justice of the Supreme Court of Nevada (1966–1971).
- Ferruccio Dalla Torre, 55, Italian Olympic bobsledder (1964).
- Bruno Gamba, 57, Italian Olympic rower (1952).
- Woody Hayes, 74, American college football coach (Ohio State), heart attack.
- Micheline Kahn, 97, French harpist and pianist.
- Frans Kuijper, 86, Dutch Olympic water polo player and coach (1928).
- Richard Levinson, 52, American screenwriter and producer (Columbo), heart attack.
- Jack Marks, 92, English performer and screenwriter (Up for the Cup), lung cancer.

=== 13 ===
- Edward Peck Curtis, 90, American World War I flying ace, Air Service Major General, pneumonia.
- Hafizur Rahman Wasif Dehlavi, 77, Indian Muslim scholar and poet.
- Dezső Grósz, 88, Hungarian Olympic footballer (1924).
- Bernhard Grzimek, 77, German zoo director, author and animal conservationist, heart attack.
- Jack Haines, 66, English footballer.
- Peter Henrici, 63, Swiss mathematician (numerical analysis).
- David Lewis, 83, American Hollywood film producer (Dark Victory), pneumonia.
- Gerald Moore, 87, English classical pianist.
- Wayne Osborne, 74, American MLB player.
- Hugh Roberton, 86, Australian politician, Minister for Social Services, Australian Ambassador to Ireland.
- Fela Sowande, 81, Nigerian musician and composer.

=== 14 ===
- Peter Beter, 65, American attorney and financier.
- Tex Fletcher, 77, American singing cowboy, actor and radio & television personality.
- Rushdi al-Kikhya, 87–88, Syrian political leader, Speaker of the Parliament of Syria.
- Ivor Preece, 66, English international rugby union footballer (Coventry, England).
- Ali Muhammad Rashidi, 81, Pakistani journalist, politician and diplomat.
- Gerard Steenson, appr. 29, Irish republican paramilitary commander, ambushed and killed.
- Ian MacAlister Stewart, 91, Scottish military officer in the British Army.

=== 15 ===
- Douglas Abbott, 87, Canadian Member of Parliament, justice of the Supreme Court of Canada.
- W. Sterling Cole, 82, American politician, lawyer, and Director General of the International Atomic Energy Agency, cancer.
- Red Dutton, 89, Canadian NHL ice hockey player (Montreal Maroons), coach and executive.
- Léon Fleuriot, 64, French linguist and Celtic scholar.
- Don Gant, 44, American singer, songwriter and record producer, boating accident.

=== 16 ===
- León Bozzi, 58, Argentine Olympic sports shooter (1956).
- Jack Brumfitt, 70, English cricketer.
- Christof Frommelt, 68, Liechtensteiner Olympic cross-country skier (1948).
- Bob Kline, 77, American Major League baseball player (Boston Red Sox).
- Vivian Martin, 93, American stage and silent-screen actress.
- Scott McKay, 71, American actor, kidney failure.
- Juan Gómez Millas, 86, Chilean fascist politician.
- Raymond Passello, 82, Swiss Olympic footballer (1928).
- Tjaak Pattiwael, 73, Indonesian footballer.
- Allan Perry-Keene, 88, English officer in the Royal Air Force, Commander-in-Chief of the Royal Pakistan Air Force.
- Joseph E. Schaefer, 68, American soldier in the U.S. Army, recipient of the Medal of Honor.
- Samuel H. Shapiro, 79, American politician, Governor of Illinois.
- Johan Otto von Spreckelsen, 57, Danish architect, designed the Grande Arche.

=== 17 ===
- Carlos Arancibia, 75, Chilean footballer.
- Tom Cothran, 39, American musicologist and composer, AIDS.
- Georg Lammers, 81, German sprinter and Olympic medalist.
- Antonio Lopez, 44, Puerto Rican fashion illustrator, complication of AIDS.
- Ron Saggers, 69, Australian Test cricketer.
- Derief Taylor, 76, Jamaican first-class cricketer and coach.
- Hjördis Töpel, 83, Swedish Olympic swimmer and diver (1924, 1928).
- Salvatore Toma, 35, Italian poet, suicide.
- Santo Trafficante Jr., 72, American Mafia boss, allied with Sam Giancana.

=== 18 ===
- Milorad Arsenijević, 80, Serbian footballer and manager, and Olympian (BSK Beograd, Yugoslavia).
- Bil Baird, 82, American puppeteer, pneumonia and cancer.
- Claude I. Bakewell, 74, American lawyer, member of U.S. House of Representatives (1947–1949, 1951–1953), emphysema.
- Lewis Bandt, 77, Australian car designer, designed and built the first utes, car accident.
- Antun Banek, 85, Yugoslav Olympic cyclist (1928).
- Charles Morales, 91, Jamaican cricketer.
- Elizabeth Poston, 81, English composer, pianist and writer.
- Gustav Rehn, 72, Norwegian footballer.
- Ken Reynolds, 78, Australian rules footballer.

=== 19 ===
- Punaloor Balan, 60, Indian writer and poet, cancer.
- Louis de Broglie, 94, French physicist contributing to quantum theory and Nobel laureate in Physics.
- Paddy Farrell, 75, Irish footballer.
- Edward Jankowski, 57, Polish footballer.
- Red Jones, 81, American baseball umpire.
- Robert-Jean Longuet, 85, French lawyer, journalist and militant socialist.
- Juan Mascaró, 89, Spanish translator.
- Ruth Meiers, 61, American politician, Lieutenant Governor of North Dakota, cancer.
- Emile Meyer, 76, American actor.
- Arch Oboler, 79, American playwright, novelist and director (Lights Out), heart failure.
- Harold Rosenthal, 69, English music critic, writer and opera broadcaster.
- Tony Stratton Smith, 53, English rock music manager, founded record label Charisma Records, pancreatic cancer.

=== 20 ===
- Warren G. Brown, 66, American rodeo cowboy, prostate cancer.
- Joseph Fitzgerald, 82, American Olympic ice hockey player (1932).
- Luigi Gandini, 58, Italian Olympic rower (1948).
- Licio Giorgieri, 61, Italian air force general, murdered.
- Norman Harris, 39, American guitarist and songwriter, cardiovascular disease.
- Russell Ohl, 89, American scientist, patented the modern solar cell.
- Rita Streich, 66, German opera singer.
- Kenneth Threadgill, 77, American country singer and tavern owner, pulmonary embolism.
- Harry Windsor, 72, Irish-born Australian cardiac surgeon.

=== 21 ===
- Walter L. Gordon, 81, Canadian businessman, politician and writer, President of the Privy Council, heart attack.
- Dean Paul Martin, 35, American pop singer and actor, air crash.
- Robert Preston, 68, American actor and singer (The Music Man), lung cancer.
- Ollie Sansen, 79, American NFL player.
- Jacob Taubes, 64, Austrian rabbi, philosopher and scholar of Judaism.

=== 22 ===
- Louis De Geer, 77, Swedish diplomat.
- Louis M. Hacker, 88, American economic historian, professor of economics.
- Charlie Jarzombek, 44, American race car driver, racing accident.
- Max Kelly, 77, Australian rules footballer.
- Bill McGuffie, 59, British pianist, film composer and conductor, cancer.
- Joan Shawlee, 61, American film and television actress (The Dick Van Dyke Show, Some Like It Hot), breast cancer.

=== 23 ===
- Emilio Giuseppe Dossena, 83, Italian painter.
- Maurice Dunand, 89, French archaeologist specializing in the ancient Near East.
- Eugene Gelfand, 67, American politician, member of the Pennsylvania House of Representatives (1955–1974).
- Walter Walford Johnson, 82, American businessman and politician, Governor of Colorado.
- Edward Lamb, 85, American businessman, broadcasting executive and labour lawyer.
- Reg Lye, 74, Australian actor.
- John Mariucci, 70, American ice hockey player, administrator and coach, cancer.
- Morton Minsky, 85, American burlesque owner, co-owner of Minsky's Burlesque, cancer.
- Tony Pacheco, 59, Cuban-born baseball player and Major League coach (Houston Astros).
- Herald F. Stout, 83, American admiral in the U.S. Navy.
- Ilse Totzke, 73, German musician, survivor of the Ravensbrück concentration camp.

=== 24 ===
- Vicente Calderón, 73, Spanish businessman, president of Atlético Madrid.
- A. Spencer Feld, 96, American politician and lawyer.
- Alan Gale, 56, Australian rules footballer (Fitzroy) and commentator, heart attack.
- Takeru Higuchi, 69, American chemist, invented time-release medication capsule.
- Sarah Goddard Power, 51, American political activist, suicide.

=== 25 ===
- Carolin Babcock, 74, American tennis player, U.S. Open doubles champion, stroke.
- Gusta Fučíková, 83, Czech publicist, editor and politician.
- Alvin Gipson, 72, American baseball player.
- Rupe Hutton, 80, Australian rules footballer.
- Ivan Ivanov-Vano, 87, Soviet animator and screenwriter.
- John Kloss, 49, American fashion designer, known for lingerie and sleepwear, suicide.
- Henry Richardson Labouisse Jr., 83, American diplomat and statesman, executive director of UNICEF, cancer.
- Moustache, 58, French actor and jazz drummer, car accident.
- Roman Mrugała, 69, Polish football player and manager.
- William M. Register Jr., 56, American politician, member of the Florida House of Representatives (1966–1970).

=== 26 ===
- Walter Abel, 88, American actor, heart attack.
- Lodovico Alessandri, 83, Brazilian Olympic fencer (1936, 1948).
- Walter Clark, 96, Canadian politician, member of the Legislative Assembly of Manitoba (1955–1958).
- Henrieta Delavrancea, 89, Romanian architect.
- Ohene Djan, 63, Ghanaian sports administrator and politician, member of the Legislative Assembly.
- Pascual Gutiérrez, 72, Mexican Olympic athlete (1936).
- Eugen Jochum, 84, German conductor.
- Robert Gwyn Macfarlane, 79, English hematologist.
- Conrad Moll, 87, American collegiate coach (Valparaiso).
- Clem Morden, 79, Australian rules footballer.
- Georg Muche, 91, German painter, architect and author.
- Mary Odette, 85, French-born British silent-screen actress.
- Erich Römer, 92, German Olympic ice hockey player (1928, 1932).
- Michael Stancliffe, 70, English Anglican priest, Dean of Winchester.
- Skeeter Watkins, 71, American baseball player.

=== 27 ===
- Giuseppe Ambrosoli, 63, Italian Catholic priest, renal failure.
- Rudolph Anders, 91, German-born American actor.
- William Bowers, 71, American reporter, playwright and screenwriter, respiratory failure.
- Tim Lee Carter, 76, American politician, member of U.S. House of Representatives (1965–1981), anaemia.
- Erich Clar, 84, Austrian organic chemist.
- Olha Franko, 90, Ukrainian writer, creator of the first Ukrainian cookbook.
- Luis Chávez y González, 85, El Salvadoran Roman Catholic prelate, Archbishop of San Salvador.
- Lloyd Goodrich, 89, American art historian, cancer.
- Stane Kavčič, 67, Prime Minister of Slovenia.
- Tonny Koeswoyo, 51, Indonesian rock musician and leader of the group Koes Plus.
- James Maddern, 73, Australian cricketer.
- Peter Mason, 65, English-born Australian physicist and science communicator.
- Hans-Georg von der Osten, 91, German World War I flying ace and Luftwaffe commander during World War II.
- Roy Outram, 86, Australian rules footballer.
- Martin Provensen, 70, American illustrator, heart attack.
- Cecil Yates, 74, American track cyclist.

=== 28 ===
- Horace M. Albright, 97, American conservationist, director of the National Park Service.
- Alphonse Alley, 56, Beninese military officer, President of Dahomey (Benin).
- Earl Dawson, 61, Canadian ice hockey administrator.
- Oliver K. Kelley, 82, Finnish-born American engineer, developed the automatic transmission.
- Lê Văn Kim, 68–69, South Vietnamese army general.
- Antonio Quarantotto, 91, Italian Olympic swimmer (1920).
- Maria von Trapp, 82, Austrian matriarch of the Trapp family, heart failure.
- Patrick Troughton, 67, English actor (Doctor Who), heart attack.

=== 29 ===
- Richard Aaron, 85, Welsh philosopher.
- Lawrence Anini, appr. 26, Nigerian bandit, executed.
- József Kovács, 61, Hungarian Olympic athlete (1952, 1956, 1960).
- Jock McCorkell, 68, Australian rules footballer.
- Mario Montesanto, 77, Italian football manager and player.
- Jakob Nacken, 81, German-born American circus performer.
- Akaki Shanidze, 100, Georgian linguist and philologist.
- John Wiley, 60, South African cricketer and politician, Minister of Environmental Affairs and Tourism, suicide.
- Richard Wilson, 66, American science fiction writer.

=== 30 ===
- Everard Baker, 73, Australian cricketer.
- George Blackerby, 83, American MLB player (Chicago White Sox).
- Pyotr Gusev, 82, Russian ballet dancer, teacher and choreographer.
- Bill Jones, 74, Australian rules footballer.
- Veniamin Levich, 69, Soviet-born American chemist (Levich equation), cardiac arrest.
- Henry Mang, 89, Canadian politician, member of the House of Commons of Canada (1953–1957).
- Clint Murchison Jr., 63, American businessman, founder of the Dallas Cowboys football team, pneumonia.
- Giorgio Pini, 88, Italian politician and journalist.
- Dorothy Ward, 96, English actress.
- Lynn Townsend White Jr., 79, American historian, heart failure.

=== 31 ===
- David Adler, 51, American physicist and MIT professor (Condensed matter physics), heart attack.
- Unicorn Chan, 46–47, Hong Kong actor, martial artist and stuntman, car crash.
- Ernest R. Miller, 94, American collegiate coach.
- Ram Panjwani, 75, Indian writer and folk singer.
- Roy Rushbrook, 75, Australian cricketer.

=== Unknown date ===
- Arthur Holland, 70, English football referee.
- Lesley Osmond, 65, British actress.
