= Halvorsen =

Halvorsen is a Norwegian patronymic surname. Notable people with the surname include:

- Aasmund Halvorsen Vinje (1851–1917), Norwegian politician for the Liberal Party
- Andreas Halvorsen (golfer) (born 1996), Norwegian professional golfer
- Andreas Fjeld Halvorsen (born 2005), Norwegian runner
- Anne Marie Halvorsen (born 1967), Norwegian sport wrestler
- Asbjørn Halvorsen (1898–1955), Norwegian footballer
- August Herman Halvorsen (1866–1929), Norwegian politician
- Birger Halvorsen (1905–1976), Norwegian high jumper
- Børge-Are Halvorsen (born 1978), Norwegian jazz musician
- Brooke Halvorsen (born 1990), Canadian volleyball player
- Carl Herman Halvorsen (1837–1918), Norwegian politician
- Einar Halvorsen (1872–1964), Norwegian speedskater
- Einfrid Halvorsen (born 1937), Norwegian trade unionist and politician
- Eirik Halvorsen (born 1975), Norwegian former ski jumper
- Eyvind Fjeld Halvorsen (1922–2013), Norwegian philologist
- Finn Halvorsen (born 1947), Norwegian former ski jumper
- Fredrik Halvorsen (born 1973), Norwegian businessperson
- Gail Halvorsen (1920–2022), US Air Force officer
- Gunnar Halvorsen (1945–2006), Norwegian politician
- Haldis Halvorsen (1889–1936), Musical artist
- Harald Halvorsen (footballer) (1898–1992), Norwegian footballer
- Harald Halvorsen (gymnast) (1887–1965), Norwegian artistic gymnast
- Harald Halvorsen (musician) (born 1949), Musical artist
- Harald Halvorsen (politician) (1877–1943), Norwegian politician
- Håvard Halvorsen (born 1973), Norwegian footballer
- Heidi Aassveen Halvorsen (born 1976), Norwegian handball player
- Hjalmer S. Halvorsen (1884–1970), American businessman and politician
- Isak Halvorsen (1877–1961), Norwegian politician
- Jahn Brochmann Halvorsen (1916–1976), Norwegian diplomat
- Jan Frøystein Halvorsen (1928–2016), Norwegian judge
- Jan Halvor Halvorsen (born 1963), Norwegian footballer and manager
- Jens Braage Halvorsen (1845–1900), Norwegian librarian and literary historian
- Johan Halvorsen (1864–1935), Norwegian composer, conductor and violinist
- John Halvorsen (born 1966), Norwegian long-distance runner
- Jon Anders Halvorsen (born 1968), Norwegian folk singer and physician
- Katherine Halvorsen, American statistician
- Kathy Halvorsen (born 1961), American environmental scientist
- Kjell H. Halvorsen (1946–2006), Norwegian diplomat
- Kristin Halvorsen (born 1960), Norwegian politician
- Kristoffer Halvorsen (born 1996), Norwegian road cyclist
- Lars Halvorsen Sons, boat builders
- Leif Halvorsen (1887–1959), Norwegian violinist, conductor and composer
- Line Halvorsen (born 1969), Norwegian filmmaker
- Magnus Halvorsen (1853–1922), Norwegian politician
- Martin Julius Halvorsen (1867–1951), Norwegian politician
- Mette Halvorsen (born 1965), Norwegian curler
- Ole Andreas Halvorsen (born 1961), Norwegian hedge fund manager
- Ole Jørgen Halvorsen (born 1987), Norwegian footballer
- Ole Martin Halvorsen (born 2000), Norwegian sport shooter
- Otto Bahr Halvorsen (1872–1923), 14th Prime Minister of Norway
- Øystein Halvorsen (born 2000), Norwegian orienteer
- Ragnar Halvorsen (1924–2019), Norwegian businessman and organizational leader
- Ragnar Halvorsen (footballer) (1893–1933), Norwegian footballer
- Roald Halvorsen (1914–2010), Norwegian politician
- Sarah Halvorsen (born 1995), Female Australian rules footballer
- Seth Halvorsen (born 2000), American baseball player
- Sigrid Halvorsen (born 1941), Norwegian handball player
- Sigurd Halvorsen (1910–1978), Norwegian trade unionist and politician
- Sigurd Halvorsen Johannessen (1881–1964), Norwegian acting councillor of state
- Stein Grieg Halvorsen (1909–2013), Norwegian actor
- Stein Lund Halvorsen (born 1959), Norwegian sailor
- Stian Lind Halvorsen (born 1975), Norwegian footballer
- Sverre Halvorsen (illustrator) (1891–1936), Norwegian artist and animation creator
- Sverre Halvorsen (professor) (1925–2012), Former Norwegian pediatrician
- Terry Halvorsen, American military officer
- Thor Halvorsen (born 1988), South African rugby union player
- Tor Halvorsen (1930–1987), Norwegian trade unionist and politician
- Tordis Halvorsen (1885–1955), Norwegian actress
- Tore Halvorsen (born 1950), Norwegian businessman
- Tore Halvorsen (singer) (born 1949), Norwegian dansband musician
- Trond Halvorsen Wirstad (1904–1985), Norwegian politician
- Trygve Halvorsen, Norwegian chess player
- Victor Halvorsen (born 2004), Norwegian footballer

== See also ==
- Halvor
- Halvorson
