= 1922 in Norwegian football =

Football in Norway
Men's football
- NM: Odd

Results from Norwegian football in 1922.

== Class A of local association leagues ==
Class A of local association leagues (kretsserier) is the predecessor of a national league competition.

League	Champion
Østfold	Kvik (Fredrikshald)
Kristiania	Lyn
Follo	Oppegård
Aker	Stabæk
Lillestrøm og omegn	Lillestrøm BK
Øvre Romerike	Haga
Eidsvoll og omegn	Eidsvold IF
Hamar og omegn	Hamar IL
Opland	Fremad
Glommendalen	Kongsvinger
Nordre Østerdalen	Tynset
Trysil og Engerdal	Østby
Buskerud^{1}	Drafn
Vestfold	Ørn
Telemark^{2}	Odd
Aust-Agder	Grane (Arendal)
Vest-Agder	Donn
Rogaland	Stavanger IF
Hordaland	Os
Bergen	Brann
Sogn og Fjordane	Falken (Høyanger)
Søndmøre	Aalesund
Romsdalske	Molde
Sør-Trøndelag	Mercur
Trondhjem	Brage
Nord-Trøndelag	Sverre
Helgeland	Glimt
Lofoten og Vesterålen	Narvik/Nor
Troms	Harstad
Finnmark	Vardø

- ^{1}Buskerud local association split into Drammen og omegn and Øvre Buskerud.
- ^{2}Telemark local association split into Grenland and Øvre Telemark.

== Norwegian Cup ==
=== Final ===
15 October 1922

Odd	5–1	Kvik (Fredrikshald)
Eek 5'; Ulrichsen 20'; Haakonsenn 48'; Gundersen 80'; Svendsen 81' (o.g.)	Report	Nielsen 85'

Brann Stadion, Bergen
Attendance: 8,000
Referee: Thorvald E. Johnsen (Trygg)

== National team ==
23 August 1922 Friendly	Sweden	0–0	Norway	Stockholm, Sweden
17:30 (UTC+1); Match 46		Report		Stadium: Olympic Stadium; Attendance: 14,000; Referee: Einer Ulrich (Denmark)

26 August 1922 Friendly	Finland	1–3	Norway	Helsinki, Finland
17:30 (UTC+2); Match 47	Eklöf 60'	Report	Nielsen 38'; Strøm 43'; Gundersen 85'	Stadium: Töölön Pallokenttä; Attendance: 5,000; Referee: Eric Gustavsson (Sweden)

10 September 1922 Friendly	Norway	3–3	Denmark	Fredrikstad, Norway
13:00 (UTC+1); Match 48	Gundersen 5'; Wilhelms 74'; Aas 89'	Report	Grøthan 30'; Nielsen 38', 76'	Stadium: Fredrikstad Idræts- og Fotbaldplads; Attendance: 10,500; Referee: Hjalmar Lundberg (Sweden)

24 September 1922 Friendly	Norway	0–5	Sweden	Kristiania, Norway
12:30 (UTC+1); Match 49		Report	Malm 4', 25'; Dahl 30', 40', 75'	Stadium: Gressbanen; Attendance: 15,000; Referee: Lauritz Andersen (Denmark)
