= Halvorson =

Halvorson is a surname. Notable people with the surname include:

- David Halvorson (1948–2013), American politician
- Debbie Halvorson (born 1958), American politician from Illinois
- Gary Halvorson, American television and film director
- George Halvorson (born 1947), American healthcare executive
- Halvor L. Halvorson (1881–1951), American politician from North Dakota
- H. Orin Halvorson (1897–1975), American microbiologist
- Harlyn O. Halvorson (1925–2008), American microbiologist
- Henry Theodore Halvorson (1883–1943), American lumber salesman and political figure
- Josephine Halvorson (born 1981), American artist
- Kittel Halvorson (1846–1936), American politician from Minnesota
- Kristina Halvorson (born 1971), American author
- Mary Halvorson (born 1980), American jazz musician
- Melissa Halvorson Wiklund (born 1962), American politician from Minnesota
- Rod Halvorson (born 1949), American politician from Iowa
- Roger Halvorson (1934–2014), American politician

== See also ==
- Halvorsen
