= Jan Halvorsen =

Jan Halvorsen may refer to:

- Jan Frøystein Halvorsen (1928–2016), Norwegian judge
- Jan Halvor Halvorsen (born 1963), Norwegian footballer and coach

== See also ==
- Halvorsen
