= 1922 Norwegian Football Cup =

Norgesmesterskapet i fotball for menn 1922

Tournament details
- Country: Norway

Final positions
- Champions: Odd (8th title)
- Runners-up: Kvik (Fredrikshald)

The 1922 Norwegian Football Cup was the 21st season of the Norwegian annual knockout football tournament. The tournament was open for all members of NFF. Frigg were the defending champions, but were eliminated by Moss in the fourth round. Last years losing finalist, Odd won their eighth title, having beaten Kvik (Fredrikshald) in the final.

== Second round ==
Team 1	Score	Team 2
Brage	8–0	Tynset
Brodd	w/o	Flekkefjord
Djerv	1–4	Stavanger
Donn	4–3	Start
Drafn	9–1	Kongsvinger
Falk	0–2	Frigg
Fredrikstad	4–0	Vaalerengen
Kvik (Trondhjem)	7–0	Rendalen
Larvik Turn	7–1	Hamar
Lillestrøm	6–2	Fremad
Lyn	7–1	Drammen
Moss	2–0	Eidsvold
Ready	5–1	Urædd
Rollon	3–0	Braatt
Sarpsborg	3–0	Bryn
Skiold	1–3	Mercantile
Smart	2–5	Aalesund
Storm	1–0	Kjapp
Strømsgodset	3–2 (a.e.t.)	Tønsberg Turn
Tryggkameratene	5–2	Rapp
Viking	1–8	Brann
Fram (Larvik)	Bye	
Freidig	Bye	
Lyn (Gjøvik)	Bye	
Odd	Bye	
Skotfos	Bye	
Trygg	Bye	
Ørn	Bye	

== Third round ==
Team 1	Score	Team 2
Aalesund	5–1	Rollon
Brage	0–2 (Note: Kvik (Trondhjem) had to play against two different oppositions in the same round!)	Kvik (Trondhjem)
Stavanger	5–1	Brodd
Donn	0–2	Larvik Turn
Drafn	1–0	Storm
Fram (Larvik)	0–2	Sarpsborg
Fredrikstad	8–1	Lillestrøm
Lyn (Gjøvik)	5–3	Freidig
Trygg	2–9	Kvik (Fredrikstad)
Moss	2–0	Skotfos
Odd	4–3	Ready
Strømsgodset	2–3 (a.e.t.)	Ørn
Kvik (Trondhjem)	7–0	Tryggkameratene
Brann	Bye	
Frigg	Bye	
Lyn	Bye	
Mercantile	Bye	

== Fourth round ==
Team 1	Score	Team 2
Aalesund	0–3	Drafn
Larvik Turn	3–1	Brann
Kvik (Trondhjem)	3–1	Fredrikstad
Frigg	0–3	Moss
Stavanger	1–4	Kvik (Fredrikstad)
Ørn	3–0	Lyn (Gjøvik)
Sarpsborg	2–1	Lyn
Mercantile	1–4	Odd

== Quarter-finals ==
Team 1	Score	Team 2
Ørn	4–2	Drafn
Kvik (Trondhjem)	3–5	Kvik (Fredrikstad)
Odd	2–1	Larvik Turn
Sarpsborg	0–1	Moss

== Semi-finals ==
Team 1	Score	Team 2
Moss	0–1	Kvik (Fredrikstad)
Ørn	1–2	Odd

== Final ==
15 October 1922

Odd	5–1	Kvik (Fredrikshald)
Eek 5'; Ulrichsen 20'; Haakonsenn 48'; Gundersen 80'; Svendsen 81' (o.g.)	Report	Nielsen 85'

Brann Stadion, Bergen
Attendance: 8,000
Referee: Thorvald E. Johnsen (Trygg)

== See also ==
- 1922 in Norwegian football
