= Emil Hansen =

Emil Hansen can refer to:

- Emil Hansen (footballer)
- Emil Christian Hansen, Danish mycologist and fermentation physiologist.
