= List of left-handed presidents of the United States =

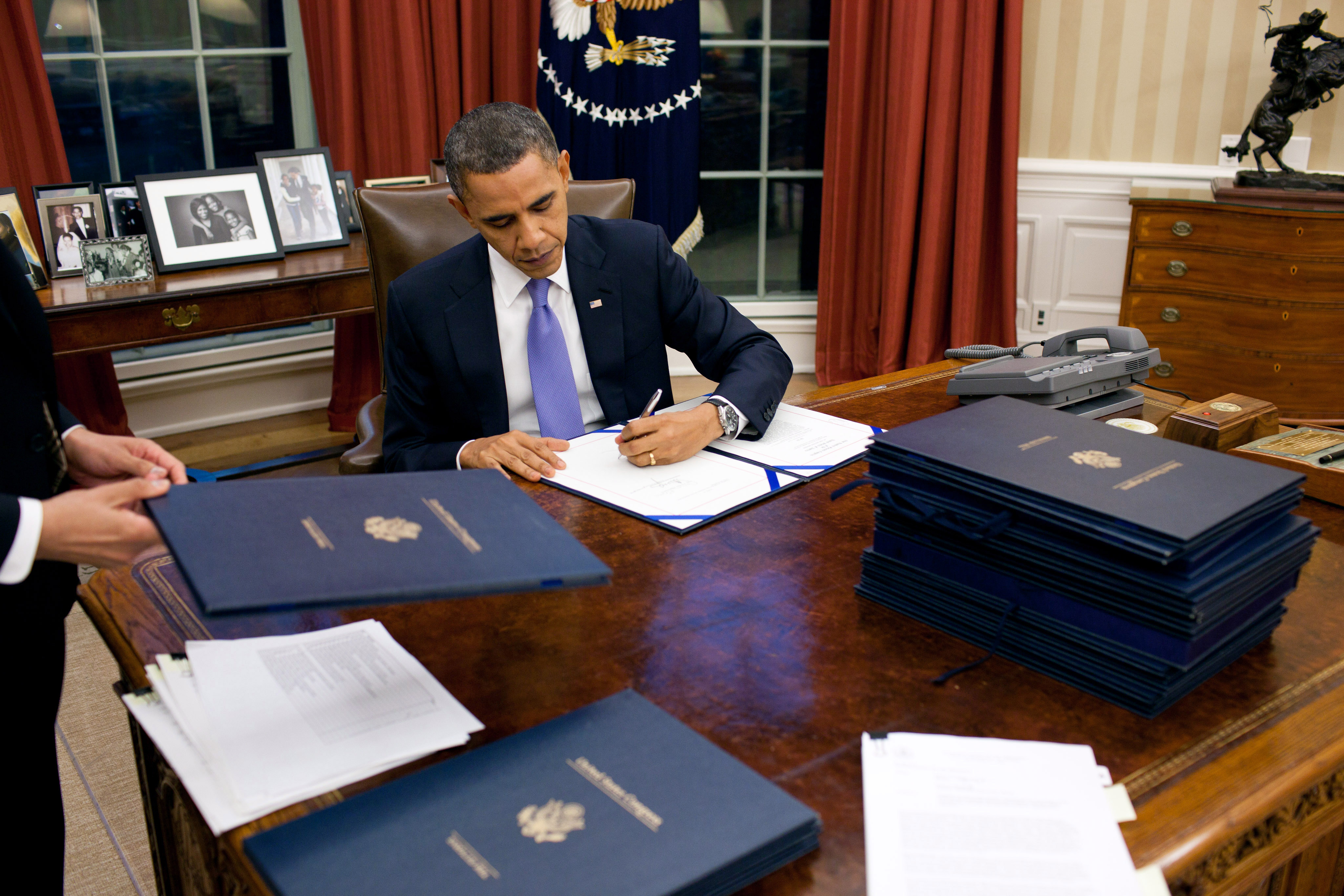
Barack Obama signing with his left hand

At least 7 of the 45 men (Note: While there have been 47 presidencies, only 45 individuals have served as president. Two presidents have served non-consecutive terms: and thus, by convention, Grover Cleveland is numbered as both the 22nd and 24th U.S. president, and Donald Trump is numbered as both the 45th and 47th U.S. president.) who have been President of the United States have been left-handed. Only one U.S. president prior to the 20th century is known to be left-handed. Of the fourteen U.S. presidents since World War II, six have been left-handed.

Various theories about why left-handers are overrepresented among U.S. presidents have been proposed. Biologist Amar Klar studied handedness and determined that left-handed people "...have a wider scope of thinking". In a 2019 Journal of Neurosurgery article Nathan R. Selden argued that since left-handed people are individuals who are dominant in their right-hemisphere, this might make presidents "more effective leaders or at least more effective political candidates". University of British Columbia psychology professor Stanley Coren, author of the book The Left-Handed Syndrome, said, "left-handers actually have a profile that works very well for a politician". In a 2021 Business Insider article reporters Alexandra Ma and Talia Lakritz state, "According to some research, lefties may be more creative, be better at 'divergent thinking' – generating new ideas based on existing information – and face challenges better."

Medical researcher Jonathan Belsey argued that, given a 13% prevalence of left-handedness, the long-term average is not statistically high, but rather has a p-value of 0.77, and that even the post-1881 prevalence has a 0.10 likelihood of occurring by chance.

== Left-handed presidents of the United States ==
- James A. Garfield (1881) was ambidextrous; he is the only known left-handed president prior to the 20th century.
- Harry S. Truman (1945–1953) was left-handed as a child, he wrote with his right hand and used his left for most other activities.
- Gerald Ford (1974–1977) was predominantly left-handed.
- Ronald Reagan (1981–1989) was naturally left-handed, but wrote with his right hand.
- George H. W. Bush (1989–1993) was left-handed. All three major candidates in the 1992 election, which Bill Clinton won, were left-handed.
- Bill Clinton (1993–2001) is left-handed.
- Barack Obama (2009–2017) is left-handed.

== Other presidents who demonstrated left-handed ability ==
- Thomas Jefferson (1801–1809) was right-handed, but after an injury to his right wrist, he wrote with his left hand. He was said to have been ambidextrous, and he could write equally well with either hand.
- Woodrow Wilson (1913–1921) was right-handed, but after a stroke Wilson was able to use his left hand to write "perfectly legible well-formed characters". His ability was called "remarkable neurologically".

== See also ==
- List of presidents of the United States
