= Double crown =

Double crown can refer to:

- the pschent combined crown of Ancient Egypt
- a British coin worth ten shillings or two crowns
- winning the first two of the three races in the Triple Crown of Thoroughbred Racing
- a paper size used in printing
- a double hair whorl
