= Eika =

Eika may refer to the following:

- Eika, Møre og Romsdal, an island in Ulstein municipality, Møre og Romsdal, Norway
- Hallvard Eika, a Norwegian politician
- Sverre Eika, a Norwegian footballer
- Eika (company), a subsidiary of the Mondragon Corporation in Spain
- Eika Gruppen, a Norwegian banking alliance
- Eika Ebisu, a fictional character in Wily Beast and Weakest Creature from the Touhou Project video game series
