= Muggerud =

Muggerud is a Norwegian surname. Notable people with the surname include:

- Lawrence Muggerud (born 1968), known professionally DJ Muggs, American hip hop producer
- Roald Muggerud (1931–2024), Norwegian footballer
