= Halvor Halvorson =

Halvor Halvorson may refer to:

- Halvor L. Halvorson (1881–1951), American politician and attorney
- H. Orin Halvorson (1897–1975), American microbiologist
