= Midtbø =

Midtbø is a surname. Notable people with the surname include:

- Halvor Midtbø (1883–1985), Norwegian priest and temperance activist
- Magnus Midtbø (born 1988), Norwegian climber
- Magnus Midtbø (politician) (1942–2010), Norwegian trade unionist and politician
