= Halvor =

- Gender: male
- Language: Norwegian

Origin
- Meaning: flat stone and guardian

Halvor is a name of Norwegian origin. It is a contemporary form of Halvard (Hallvard). From Old Norse hallr (“flat stone”) and vorðr (“guardian”).

== People ==
=== First name ===
- Halvor Birch (born 1885), Danish gymnast
- Halvor Birkeland (born 1894), Norwegian sailor
- Halvor Bjellaanes (born 1925), Norwegian politician
- Halvor Bunkholt (born 1903), Norwegian politician
- Halvor Bachke Guldahl (born 1859), Norwegian jurist and businessman
- Halvor Olaus Christensen (born 1800), Norwegian politician
- Halvor Cleophas {1842-1937), American farmer and politician
- Halvor Olsen Folkestad (born 1807), Norwegian bishop and councillor
- Halvor Hagen (born 1947), American football player
- Halvor Stein Grieg Halvorsen (born 1909), Norwegian actor
- Halvor Thorbjørn Hjertvik (born 1914), Norwegian politician
- Halvor Kleppen (born 1947), Norwegian media personality
- Halvor Kongsjorden (born 1911), Norwegian sports shooter
- Halvor Midtbø (born 1883), Norwegian priest
- Halvor Møgster (born 1875), Norwegian sailor
- Halvor Moxnes (born 1944), Norwegian politician
- Halvor Næs (born 1927), Norwegian ski jumper
- Halvor Nordhaug (born 1953), Norwegian bishop
- Halvor H. Peterson (1831-1917), American politician and farmer
- Halvor Heyerdahl Rasch (born 1805), Norwegian zoologist
- Halvor Saamundsen (born 1877), Norwegian politician
- Halvor Schou (born 1823), Norwegian industrialist
- Halvor Skramstad Lunn (born 1980), Norwegian snowboarder
- Halvor Sørum (born 1897), Norwegian unionist
- Halvor Steenerson (born 1852), Representative from Minnesota
- Halvor Stenstadvold (born 1944), Norwegian businessperson and politician

=== Middle name ===
- Tor Halvor Bjørnstad (born 1978, Norwegian cross-country skier
- Jan Halvor Halvorsen (born 1963), Norwegian football player
- Lars Halvor Jensen (born 1973), Norwegian record producer
- Marius Halvor Skram-Jensen (born 1881), Norwegian Danish Gymnast

== See also ==
- Halvorsen
