= Sverre Halvorsen =

Sverre Halvorsen may refer to:

- Sverre Halvorsen (illustrator)
- Sverre Halvorsen (professor)
- Sverre Halvorsen, a Norwegian film director.
