= Engsmyr =

Engsmyr is a surname. Notable people with the surname include:

- Erik Engsmyr (1929–2012), Norwegian footballer
- Jan Engsmyr (1944–2025), Norwegian politician
