= Hair whorl =

Patch of hair growing in a circular direction around a visible center point

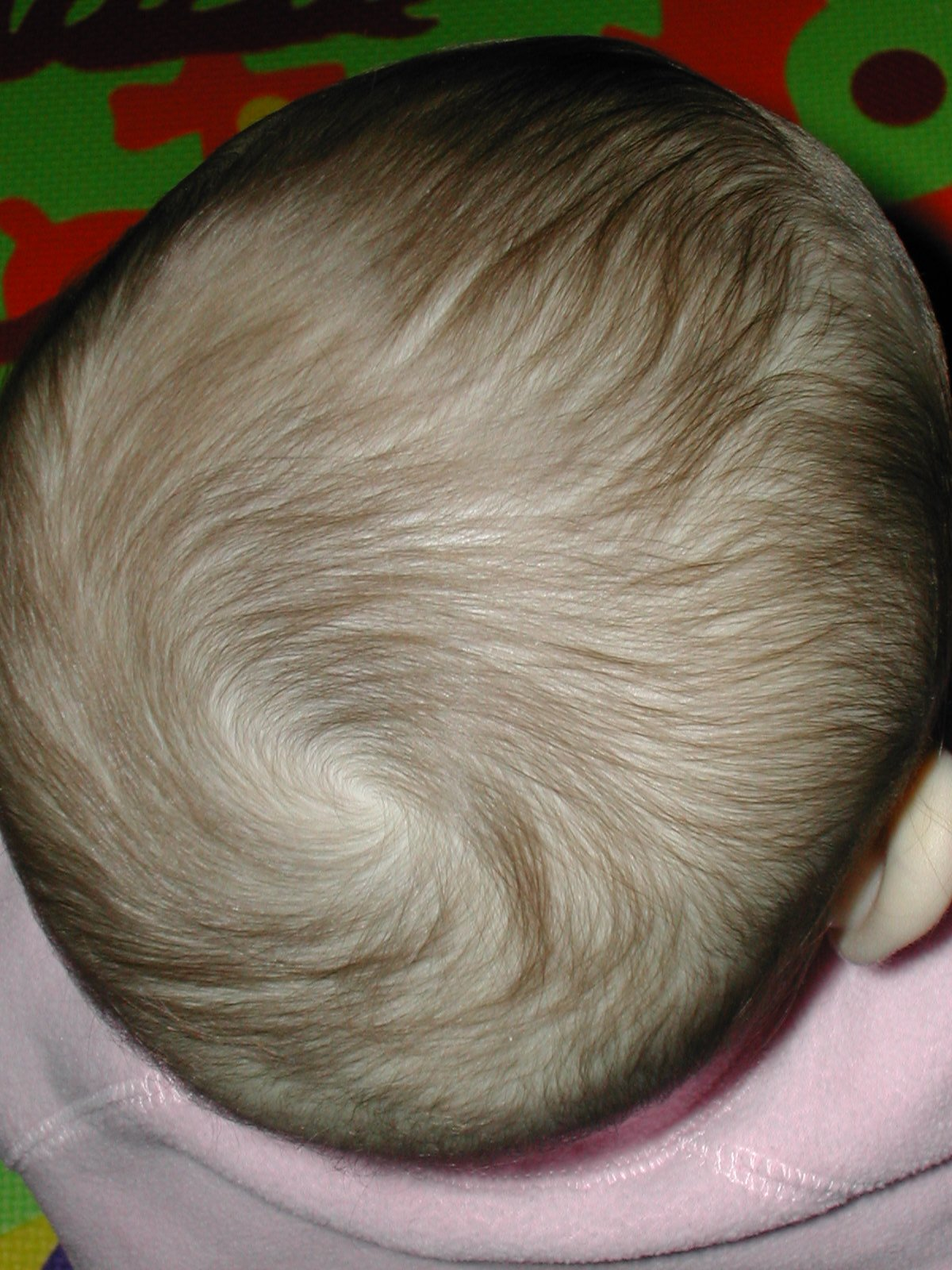
- Human baby hair whorl

Details

Identifiers
- Latin: vortices pilorum
- TA98: A16.0.00.026
- FMA: 76564

A hair whorl (also known as a crown, swirl, or trichoglyph) is a patch of hair growing in a circular direction around a visible center point. Hair whorls occur in most hairy animals on the body as well as on the head, and can be either clockwise, counterclockwise or diffuse in direction of growth.

== In human theories ==
Hair whorls on the head (parietal whorls) have been studied by some behaviorists. Most people have clockwise scalp hair-whorls. Parietal whorls which are considered to be normal scalp patterns could be a single whorl or double whorls. Cases of triple parietal whorls are less common.

Amar J. S. Klar conducted research to see if there was a genetic link between handedness and hair-whorl direction. He found that 8.4% of right-handed people and 45% of left-handed people have counterclockwise hair-whorls. His research suggested that a single gene may control both handedness and hair-whorl direction. However, Klar's research methodology in this and other studies has been questioned.

The direction of hair whorl is not consistent with Blaschko's lines.

Another result concerning handedness of the progeny of discordant monozygotic twins suggests that left handed people are one gene apart from right handed people. Together, these results suggest that a single gene controls handedness, whorl orientation, and twin concordance and discordance, and that neuronal and visceral (internal organs) forms of bilateral asymmetry are coded by separate sets of genetic pathways.

The “single gene controlling handedness, whorl orientation, twin concordance/discordance, and visceral asymmetry” idea is outdated and not supported by modern genetics. These traits are influenced by a mix of genetic factors and developmental randomness, with different pathways for brain lateralization (handedness), hair follicle growth patterns, and organ placement.

== Animal behavioral theories ==
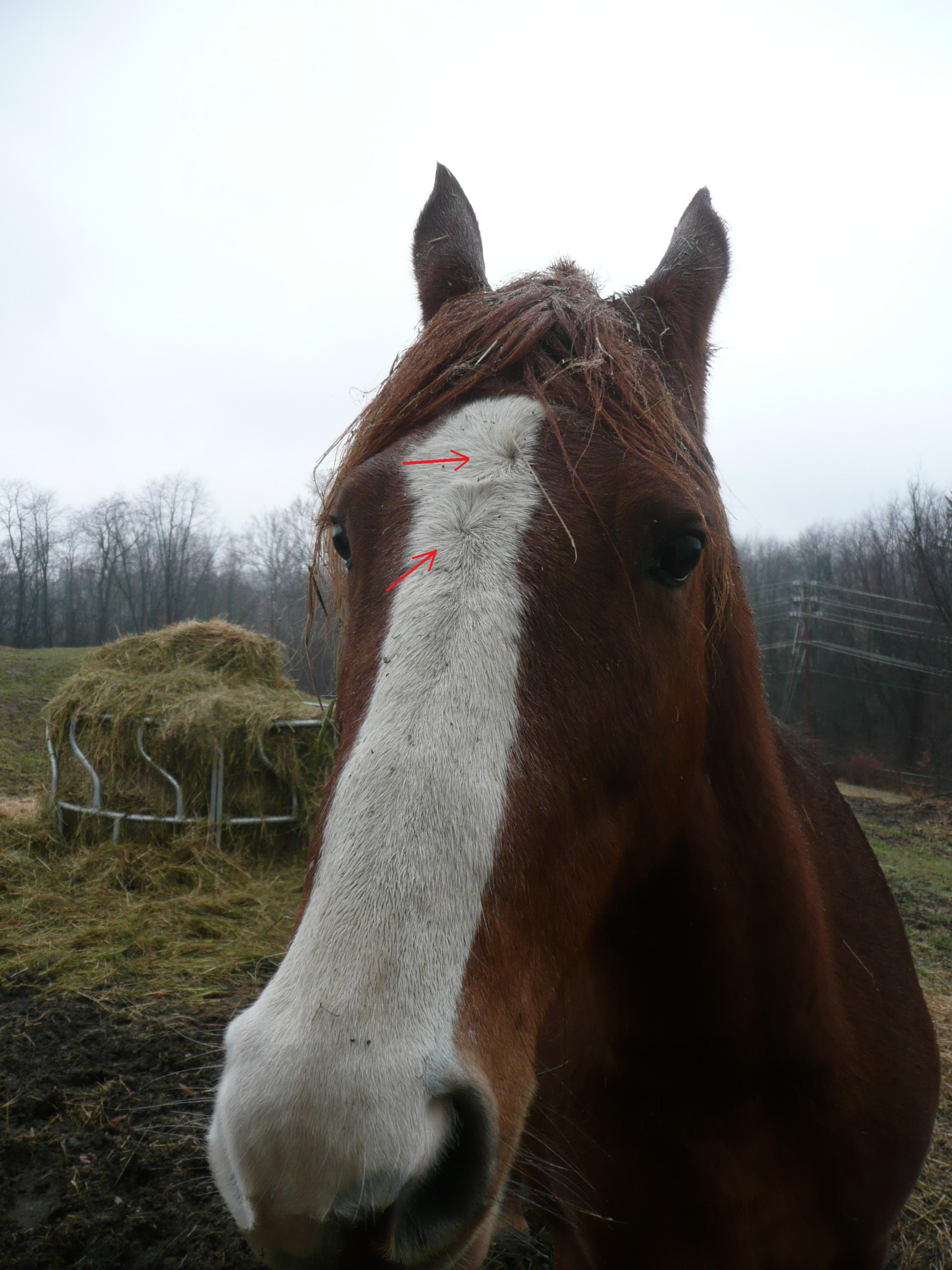
This horse has an example of two vertical whorls.

There are many (mostly apocryphal) theories concerning horse behavior and their hair whorls.

One paper has suggested that abnormal hair whorls can be used to assess the likelihood of agitated behavior or temperament in cattle in the auction ring.

== See also ==
- Hairy ball theorem
