= Amar Klar =

Indian-American geneticist

Amar J. S. Klar
- Born: Amar Jit Singh Klar; April 1, 1947; Punjab, India
- Died: March 5, 2017 (aged 69); Frederick, Maryland, United States
- Education: Punjab Agricultural University; University of Wisconsin–Madison
- Known for: Epigenetics research
- Spouse: Kuljit Klar
- Children: Nitasha and Amy
- Scientific career
- Fields: Genetics
- Institutions: Cold Spring Harbor Laboratory; National Cancer Institute
- Thesis: Enzyme regulation during vegetative growth and aporulation in Saccharomyces cerevisiae: galactose catabolic enzymes and proteinases (1975)
- Doctoral advisor: Harlyn O. Halvorson

Amar Jit Singh Klar (April 1, 1947 – March 5, 2017) was an Indian-American yeast geneticist and epigenetics researcher. He received media attention for his research on the genetics of human traits, including handedness and the direction of hair whorls.

== Early life and education ==
Klar was born on April 1, 1947, in Lyallpur, which was then part of Punjab, India, but is now part of Pakistan. He earned his undergraduate degree in 1967 and his master's degree in 1969, both from Punjab Agricultural University. In 1975, he received his Ph.D. in bacteriology from the University of Wisconsin–Madison, where he studied under Harlyn O. Halvorson. He then completed a postdoc at the University of California, Berkeley.

== Career ==
In 1978, after getting a phone call from James Watson, Klar began doing yeast research at Cold Spring Harbor Laboratory (CSHL). He continued to work there until 1988, and served as director of their Delbrück Laboratory from 1985 until then. In 1988, he left CSHL to join the National Cancer Institute (NCI) Gene Regulation and Chromosome Biology Laboratory, which was affiliated with the ABL Basic Research Program in Frederick, Maryland. In 1999, he joined the National Institutes of Health's Center for Cancer Research located in Frederick becoming a Principal Investigator. He studied genetics in yeast and applied his skills to understanding the complex inheritance patterns of psychotic disease in individuals and families.

== Scientific contributions ==
Amar Klar developed his career as yeast geneticist at Cold Spring Harbor Laboratoryin a group of other geneticists that included James Hicks and Jeffrey Strathern.

His prolific career produced numerous publications, many of which were published in premiere journals such as Nature and Science.

The novel "The Marriage Plot" written by Pulitzer prize winner Jeffrey Eugenides was loosely based on Klar's sentinel yeast genetics research while at Cold Spring Harbor Laboratory.

== Personal life and death ==
Klar grew up in a small village in India, born before the India/Pakistan partition in what is now called Pakistan. He emigrated to the United States on scholarship initially joining Brandeis University. He was married to Kuljit Klar, with whom he had two daughters: Nitasha and Amy. He died in Frederick, Maryland, on March 5, 2017, in a fall from a ladder at his home. His obituary in the Journal of Biosciences stated that he died from a " head injury".
