= Per Tidemann =

Norwegian footballer (1930–2018)

Personal information
- Date of birth: 29 September 1930
- Date of death: 27 October 2018 (aged 88)

International career
Years	Team	Apps	(Gls)
1956	Norway	3	(0)

Per Tidemann (29 September 1930 – 27 October 2018) was a Norwegian footballer. He played in three matches for the Norway national football team in 1956.
