= James Maddern =

Australian cricketer

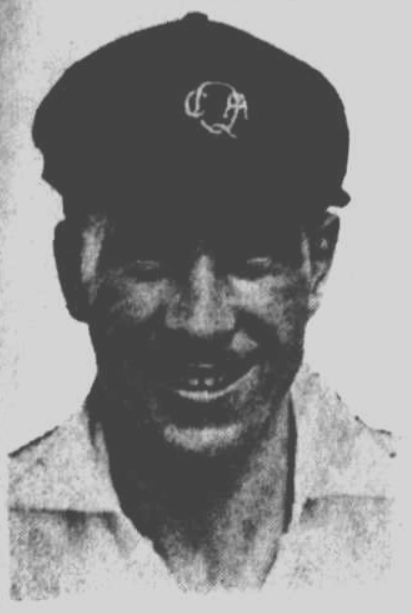

Personal information
- Born: 22 March 1914; Crows Nest, Queensland, Australia
- Died: 27 March 1987 (aged 73); Nambour, Queensland, Australia
- Source: Cricinfo, 5 October 2020

James Maddern (22 March 1914 – 27 March 1987) was an Australian cricketer. He played in five first-class matches for Queensland between 1932 and 1937.

== See also ==
- List of Queensland first-class cricketers
