= Håkon Johannessen =

Norwegian footballer (1912-1978)

Personal information
- Date of birth: 24 December 1912
- Date of death: 18 September 1978 (aged 65)

International career
Years	Team	Apps	(Gls)
1933–1937	Norway	2	(0)

Håkon Johannessen (24 December 1912 – 18 September 1978) was a Norwegian footballer. He played in two matches for the Norway national football team from 1933 to 1937.
