= Ken Reynolds (footballer) =

Australian rules footballer

Personal information
- Full name: Kenneth Claude Arthur Reynolds
- Born: 20 February 1909; Richmond, Victoria
- Died: 18 March 1987 (aged 78); Heidelberg West, Victoria

Playing career^{1}
Years	Club	Games (Goals)
1931	South Melbourne	1 (0)
- ^{1} Playing statistics correct to the end of 1931.

Kenneth Claude Arthur Reynolds (20 February 1909 – 18 March 1987) was an Australian rules footballer who played with South Melbourne in the Victorian Football League (VFL).

Reynolds enlisted to serve in the Australian Army in June 1940 and was posted to Singapore in early 1941. In 1942 he was captured by the Japanese and was interned in the Changi Prison until his release in 1945.
