= Gudmund Fredriksen =

Norwegian footballer (1899–1976)

Personal information
- Full name: Gudmund Falch Fredriksen
- Date of birth: 11 September 1899
- Place of birth: Horten, Norway
- Date of death: 26 March 1976 (aged 76)
- Position: Forward

International career
Years	Team	Apps	(Gls)
1924–1927	Norway	3	(0)

Gudmund Fredriksen (11 September 1899 – 26 March 1976) was a Norwegian footballer. He played in three matches for the Norway national football team from 1924 to 1927.
