= Anbjørn Ekeland =

Norwegian footballer (born 1947)

Personal information
- Date of birth: 8 August 1947 (age 79)
- Place of birth: Stavanger, Norway
- Position: Defender

International career
Years	Team	Apps	(Gls)
1971	Norway	3	(0)

Anbjørn Ekeland (born 8 August 1947) is a Norwegian footballer. He played in three matches for the Norway national football team in 1971.
