= Stian Lind Halvorsen =

Norwegian footballer (born 1975)

Stian Lind Halvorsen (born 3 March 1975) is a retired Norwegian football defender. He played 18 matches for Strømsgodset Toppfotball in the Norwegian Premier League in 2001.
