= Roman Mrugała =

Polish footballer

Personal information
- Full name: Roman Herbert Mrugała
- Date of birth: 28 February 1918
- Place of birth: Chorzów, Poland
- Date of death: 25 March 1987 (aged 69)
- Place of death: Chorzów, Poland
- Height: 1.78 m (5 ft 10 in)
- Position: Goalkeeper

Senior career*
Years	Team	Apps	(Gls)
1932–1939	AKS Chorzów		
- Germania Königshütte
1946–1950	AKS Chorzów		
1950–1952	Włókniarz Bielsko-Biała		

International career
1938	Poland	2	(0)

Managerial career
- 1950–1952: Włókniarz Bielsko-Biała (player-manager)
- BKS Bielsko-Biała
- WKS Wieluń
- Gwardia Wilcze Gardło
- Piast Nowa Ruda
- Górnik Lubin
- Pogoń Zabrze
- * Club domestic league appearances and goals

Roman Herbert Mrugała (28 February 1918 – 25 March 1987) was a Polish football player and manager.

He made two appearances for the Poland national team in 1938.
