= Erling Lunde =

Norwegian footballer (1902-1982)

Personal information
- Date of birth: 19 February 1902
- Date of death: 28 July 1982 (aged 80)

International career
Years	Team	Apps	(Gls)
1927–1928	Norway	2	(0)

Erling Lunde (19 February 1902 – 28 July 1982) was a Norwegian footballer. He played in two matches for the Norway national football team from 1927 to 1928.
