= Karsten Hansen (footballer) =

Norwegian footballer (1926-2009)

Personal information
- Date of birth: 29 September 1926
- Date of death: 7 August 2009 (aged 82)

International career
| Years | Team | Apps | (Gls) |
| 1950–1952 | Norway | 3 | (0) |

Karsten Hansen (29 September 1926 – 7 August 2009) was a Norwegian footballer. He played in three matches for the Norway national football team from 1950 to 1952.
