= Martinius Kristoffersen =

Norwegian footballer (1896-1949)

Personal information
- Date of birth: 18 November 1896
- Date of death: 9 November 1949 (aged 52)

International career
Years	Team	Apps	(Gls)
1921–1923	Norway	2	(0)

Martinius Kristoffersen (18 November 1896 – 9 November 1949) was a Norwegian footballer. He played in two matches for the Norway national football team in 1921 to 1923.
