= Trygve Aasen =

Norwegian footballer (1900-1938)

Personal information
- Full name: Trygve Joachim Aasen
- Date of birth: 10 November 1900
- Place of birth: Moss, Sweden-Norway
- Date of death: 16 July 1938 (aged 37)
- Position: Defender

International career
Years	Team	Apps	(Gls)
1926–1927	Norway	4	(0)

Trygve Aasen (10 November 1900 – 16 July 1938) was a Norwegian footballer. He played in four matches for the Norway national football team from 1926 to 1927.
