= Hans-Jakob Mathisen =

Norwegian footballer (born 1937)

Personal information
- Date of birth: 17 February 1937 (age 89)

International career
Years	Team	Apps	(Gls)
1959–1961	Norway	5	(0)

Hans-Jakob Mathisen (born 17 February 1937) is a Norwegian footballer. He played in five matches for the Norway national football team from 1959 to 1961.
