= Isak Halvorsen =

Norwegian politician

Isak Halvorsen (9 October 1877 - ??) was a Norwegian politician for the Liberal Party.

He served as a deputy representative to the Norwegian Parliament during the term 1928–1930, representing the Market towns of Møre og Romsdal county.

Born at Follestad in Skien Municipality, he got himself a job at the post office in Kristiansund in 1894. He was a member of the municipal council of Kristiansund Municipality from 1916 to 1931, and also chaired the local party chapter for some time. Meanwhile, he rose in the postal hierarchy to eventually become postmaster, in the city of Molde from 1936 to 1947.

During the German occupation of Norway he was imprisoned for one day, being arrested on 7 October 1944 on suspicion of him having a false passport. He was released the next day.
