= Walter Wallenborg =

Norwegian footballer (1908-1984)

Personal information
- Date of birth: 19 August 1908
- Date of death: 24 November 1984 (aged 76)

International career
Years	Team	Apps	(Gls)
1931–1934	Norway	2	(0)

Walter Wallenborg (19 August 1908 – 24 November 1984) was a Norwegian footballer. He played in two matches for the Norway national football team from 1931 to 1934.
