= Didrik Christensen =

Norwegian footballer (1903-1974)

Personal information
- Full name: Didrik Ferdinand Christensen
- Date of birth: 30 August 1903
- Place of birth: Skien, Norway
- Date of death: 24 May 1974 (aged 70)
- Position: Midfielder

International career
Years	Team	Apps	(Gls)
1933	Norway	2	(0)

Didrik Christensen (30 August 1903 – 24 May 1974) was a Norwegian footballer. He played in two matches for the Norway national football team in 1933.
