= Josephine Halvorson =

American painter, sculptor (born 1981)

- Born: 1981 (age 44–45); Brewster, Massachusetts
- Education: Cooper Union (BA); Columbia University (MFA)
- Known for: Painting

Josephine Halvorson (born 1981) is an American contemporary painter, sculptor, and print maker based in Massachusetts. She is best known for her on-site paintings, drawing from scenes of the natural world and everyday life. Her work bends material fact and immaterial illusion. Halvorson is a Professor of Art and Chair of Graduate Studies in Painting at Boston University.

== Early life and education ==
Josephine Halvorson was born and raised in Brewster, Massachusetts. Her mother and father were artists who worked across mediums. As a child, Halvorson spent time in her parents’ metal and blacksmithing shop. Metal and utilitarian object later reappear in Halvorson's paintings. While still in high school, Halvorson took life drawing classes, studied with Barnet Rubenstein at the School of Museum of Fine Arts and practiced painting on Cape Cod beaches.

Halvorson received a Bachelor of Arts from Cooper Union in 2003 and her MFA from Columbia University in 2007. In 2002, she attended a six-week intensive program at the Yale University School of Art in Norfolk, Connecticut. Following her graduation from Cooper Union, she was granted a Fulbright fellowship in Painting to Vienna.

== Career ==
=== Artistic practice ===
Halvorson primarily paints en plein air. Her scenes often depict areas found in her everyday life and natural environment, such as books, doors, windows, post-industrial machines and areas of ground. Through her practice of painting on-site and in one continuous session, her paintings are able to mark the time and place of their own creation. Halvorson's work investigates how place and environment manifests in a painting.

Halvorson views her scenes as "active objects," interacting with the artist and inhabiting their own field of scale, shape, and texture across her canvas. Halvorson's work is interested in a distinction and relationship between material and medium. Speaking with artist Firelei Báez, Halvorson said "I’ve come to think of my practice as a collaboration between me, my materials, and the world, where the painting becomes a testament to time spent together." Scale—perceptual, psychological, and literal—heavily influences Halvorson's work. Paintings in Halvorson's 2017 solo exhibition As I Went Walking at Sikkema Jenkins & Co. include hand drawn tape measures and standardized units at the top of canvases.

Halvorson's first solo museum show, Slow Burn, was exhibited in 2015 at the Southeastern Center for Contemporary Art in Winston-Salem, North Carolina. Curated by Cora Fisher, the exhibition featured over twenty oil paintings by Halvorson, each one painted over the course of a single day.

In 2016, Halvorson created three site-specific sculptures for her first outdoor exhibition at Storm King Art Center. Her large, painted wooden rulers function as both art object and perceptual tool, emphasizing the human labor of painting with the massive scale of the surrounding environment. "I was hoping it would align with certain natural features that you could almost measure — the length of the ridge of a mountain or the distance between trees,” Halvorson said of her giant measuring devices, “It is always changing based on your orientation to it.”

Halvorson's painting have appeared at Art Basel and Art Basel Miami Beach. She is one of the subject of Art21's award-winning digital documentary series New York Closer Up.

=== Academia ===
Halvorson is a Professor of Art and the Chair of Graduate Studies in Painting at Boston University. From 2010 to 2016, she served as Critic and Senior Critic at the Yale School of Art MFA program in Painting. She has also taught at The Cooper Union, Columbia University, Princeton University, the University of Tennessee Knoxville, and Yale University.

== Selected exhibitions ==
- 2008 Josephine Halvorson, West Gallery, Sikkema Jenkins & Co., New York, NY
- 2015 Slow Burn, Southeastern Center for Contemporary Art in Winston-Salem, NC Slow Burn was Halvorson's first museum survey.
- 2016 Outlooks: Josephine Halvorson, Storm King Art Center, New Windsor, NY
- 2017 Gray Matters, Wexner Art Center, Columbus, OH
- 2017 As I Went Walking, Sikkema Jenkins & Co., New York, NY
- 2018 The Lure of the Dark: Contemporary Painters Conjure the Night, MASS MoCA, North Adams, MA
- 2021 Contemporary Voices: Josephine Halvorson, The Georgia O'Keeffe Museum, Santa Fe, NM
- 2022 Josephine Halvorson: On the Ground, Ogunquit Museum of Art, ME
- 2023 Unforgotten, Sikkema Jenkins & Co., New York, NY

== Awards and honors ==
- 2006 D'Arcy Hayman Trust Scholarship, Columbia University, New York, NY
- 2007 Harriet Hale Woolley Fellowship at the Fondation des États-Unis, Paris
- 2010 Louis Comfort Tiffany Foundation Award
- 2010 New York Foundation for the Arts Award in Painting
- 2014-2015 Rome Prize, French Academy at the Villa Medici, Rome, Italy. Halvorson was the first American to be awarded the Rome Prize.
- 2019 James and Audrey Foster Prize, Institute of Contemporary Art, Boston. Halvorson's work was exhibited at the Institute of Contemporary Art in Boston as part of the prize recognizing the work of Boston-area artists.
- 2021 John Simon Guggenheim Memorial Foundation Fellowship, Fine Arts
