= Carl Poppe =

Norwegian footballer (1894–1940)

Personal information
- Date of birth: 31 March 1894
- Date of death: 4 December 1940 (aged 46)

International career
Years	Team	Apps	(Gls)
1913–1914	Norway	2	(0)

Carl Poppe (31 March 1894 – 4 December 1940) was a Norwegian footballer. He played in two matches for the Norway national football team in 1913 to 1914.
