= Wilhelm Rønning =

Norwegian footballer (1895–1983)

Personal information
- Date of birth: 10 November 1895
- Date of death: 7 September 1983 (aged 87)

International career
Years	Team	Apps	(Gls)
1915–1917	Norway	2	(0)

Wilhelm Rønning (10 November 1895 – 7 September 1983) was a Norwegian footballer. He played in two matches for the Norway national football team in 1915 to 1917.
