= William M. Register Jr. =

American politician

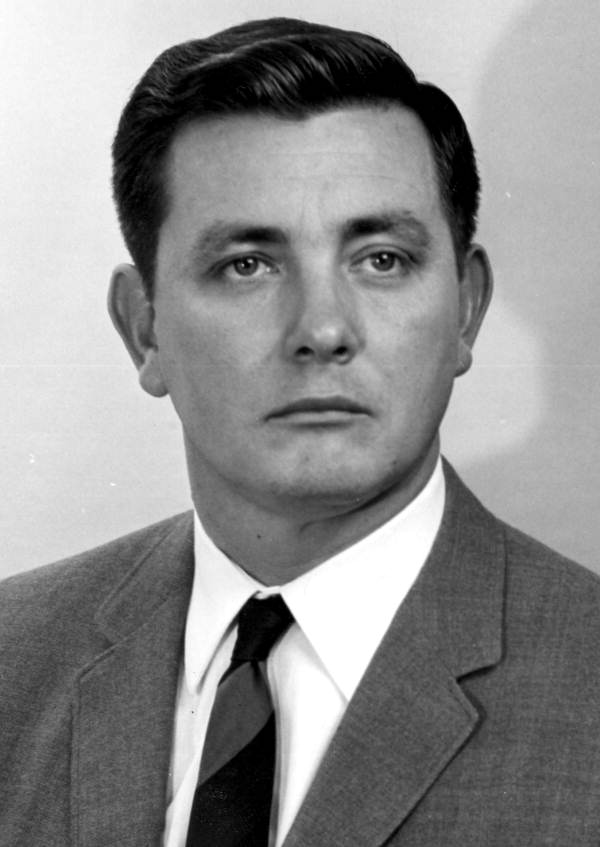
- Register in 1966

Member of the Florida House of Representatives from Hillsborough County
- In office 1966–1967

Member of the Florida House of Representatives from the 62nd district
- In office 1967–1970
- Preceded by: District established
- Succeeded by: Guy Spicola

Personal details
- Born: May 4, 1930 Nashville, Georgia, U.S.
- Died: March 25, 1987 (aged 56)
- Party: Democratic
- Education: Emory University; Tufts University; Stanford University; University of London; Cornell University

William M. Register Jr. (May 4, 1930 – March 25, 1987) was an American politician. He served as a Democratic member for the 62nd district of the Florida House of Representatives.

== Life and career ==
Register was born in Nashville, Georgia. He attended Emory University, Tufts University, Stanford University, the University of London and Cornell University.

In 1966, Register was elected to the Florida House of Representatives. The next year, he was elected as the first representative for the newly-established 62nd district. He served until 1970, when he was succeeded by Guy Spicola.

Register died on March 25, 1987, at the age of 56, and was buried in Memorial Park Cemetery, Plant City, Hillsborough, Florida.
