= Rupe Hutton =

Australian rules footballer

Personal information
- Full name: Leslie Rupert Hutton
- Born: 19 November 1906; Great Western, Victoria
- Died: 25 March 1987 (aged 80); Mentone, Victoria

Playing career^{1}
| Years | Club | Games (Goals) |
| 1929 | South Melbourne | 7 (2) |
- ^{1} Playing statistics correct to the end of 1929.

Leslie Rupert Hutton (19 November 1906 – 25 March 1987) was an Australian rules footballer who played with South Melbourne in the Victorian Football League (VFL).
