= Sverre Andersen (footballer, born 1893) =

Norwegian footballer

Personal information
- Full name: Sverre Emanuel Andersen
- Date of birth: 21 March 1893
- Place of birth: Skien, Norway
- Date of death: 14 June 1947 (aged 54)
- Position: Forward

International career
Years	Team	Apps	(Gls)
1913–1917	Norway	2	(0)

Sverre Andersen (21 March 1893 – 14 June 1947) was a Norwegian footballer. He played in two matches for the Norway national football team in 1913 to 1917.
