= H. Orin Halvorson =

American microbiologist

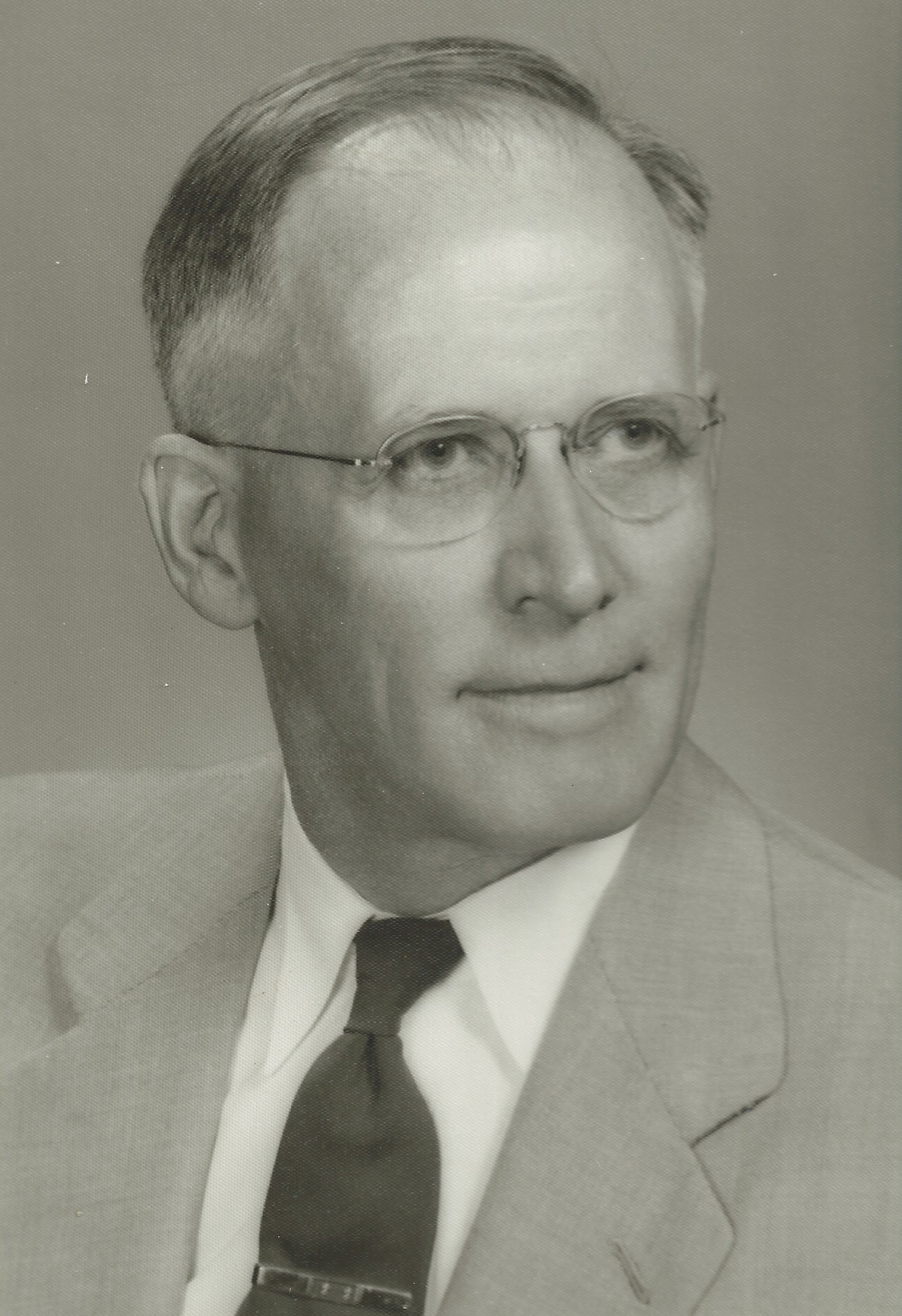
- Born: March 26, 1897; River Falls, Wisconsin
- Died: October 20, 1975 (aged 78)
- Education: University of Minnesota
- Children: Harlyn O. Halvorson, Loren E. Halvorson, Betty Casper, Gayle A. Mosand
- Awards: Guggenheim Fellowship (1957)
- Scientific career
- Fields: Microbiology
- Institutions: University of Minnesota; University of Illinois at Urbana-Champaign
- Thesis: The Importance of Bacteria in the Transformations of Iron in Nature (1928)

Halvor Orin Halvorson (March 26, 1897 – October 20, 1975) was an American microbiologist. After receiving his Ph.D. from the University of Minnesota in 1928, he continued to teach there until 1949, becoming director of their Hormel Institute in 1943. He served as head of the Bacteriology Department at the University of Illinois at Urbana-Champaign beginning in 1949, and first director of the School of Life Sciences there beginning in 1959. He retired from the University of Illinois at Urbana-Champaign in 1965, whereupon he returned to the University of Minnesota faculty. He served as president of the Society of American Bacteriologists (now known as the American Society for Microbiology) in 1955. He was awarded a Guggenheim Fellowship in 1957. His son, Harlyn O. Halvorson, was also a microbiologist who served as president of the American Society for Microbiology in 1977. This made the Halvorsons one of two father-son pairs to both serve as presidents of the Society.
