= Reidar Høilund =

Norwegian footballer (1901-1974)

Personal information
- Date of birth: 13 June 1901
- Date of death: 29 April 1974 (aged 72)

International career
Years	Team	Apps	(Gls)
1921–1923	Norway	6	(0)

Reidar Høilund (13 June 1901 – 29 April 1974) was a Norwegian footballer. He played in six matches for the Norway national football team from 1921 to 1923.
