= Keith Miller (footballer, born 1921) =

Australian rules footballer

Personal information
- Full name: Keith Esmond Miller
- Born: 20 June 1921; Penshurst, Victoria
- Died: 3 March 1987 (aged 65); Mulgrave, Victoria
- Original team: Port Fairy Rovers
- Height: 182 cm (6 ft 0 in)
- Weight: 79 kg (174 lb)

Playing career^{1}
Years	Club	Games (Goals)
1941	Geelong	5 (0)
1942	North Melbourne	7 (0)
Total		12 (0)
- ^{1} Playing statistics correct to the end of 1942.

Keith Esmond Miller (20 June 1921 – 3 March 1987) was an Australian rules footballer who played with Geelong and North Melbourne in the Victorian Football League (VFL).

Miller also served in the Royal Australian Air Force during World War II.
