= Johan Saksvik =

Norwegian footballer (1918-1983)

Personal information
- Date of birth: 21 February 1918
- Date of death: 8 June 1983 (aged 65)

International career
Years	Team	Apps	(Gls)
1948	Norway	2	(0)

Johan Saksvik (21 February 1918 – 8 June 1983) was a Norwegian footballer. He played in two matches for the Norway national football team in 1948.
