= Eric Gustavsson =

Swedish footballer

Personal information
- Full name: Sven Eric Hans Gustavsson
- Date of birth: 29 January 1982 (age 44)
- Height: 1.90 m (6 ft 3 in)
- Position: Midfielder

Senior career*
Years	Team	Apps	(Gls)
2001–2005	Örgryte IS		
2005	→ Fylkir (loan)		
2006–2010	FC Trollhättan		
- * Club domestic league appearances and goals

Eric Gustavsson (born 29 January 1982) is a Swedish retired football midfielder.
