= Karl Skifjeld =

Norwegian footballer (1920-1996)

Personal information
- Date of birth: 11 April 1920
- Date of death: 3 December 1996 (aged 76)

International career
| Years | Team | Apps | (Gls) |
| 1949–1951 | Norway | 6 | (0) |

Karl Skifjeld (11 April 1920 – 3 December 1996) was a Norwegian footballer. He played in six matches for the Norway national football team from 1949 to 1951.
