= Kathy Halvorsen =

American environmental scientist

Kathleen E. Halvorsen (born 1961) is an American environmental scientist whose research interests include biofuels, indigenous stewardship, public participation in land use decision-making, and climate change mitigation. She is Associate Vice President for Research Development and University Professor Chair of Natural Resource Policy at Michigan Technological University, where she holds a joint appointment in the Department of Social Sciences and the College of Forest Resources and Environmental Science.

== Education and career ==
Halvorsen studied the political economy of natural resources at the University of California, Berkeley, graduating in 1989. After earning a master's degree in environmental science at the State University of New York College of Environmental Science and Forestry in 1992, she completed a Ph.D. in forest resource management in 1996 at the University of Washington.

She joined Michigan Tech in 1995 as an instructor, became a regular-rank faculty member in 1996, and was named University Professor in 2019. She served as the executive director of the International Association for Society and Natural Resources for 2018–2020, and became associate vice president at Michigan Tech in 2019.

== Recognition ==
Michigan Tech gave Halvorsen their annual Research Award in 2014.
