= Robert Nilsson (footballer) =

Norwegian footballer (born 1949)

Personal information
- Date of birth: 7 April 1949 (age 77)

International career
Years	Team	Apps	(Gls)
1970–1971	Norway	5	(0)

Robert Nilsson (born 7 April 1949) is a Norwegian footballer. He played in five matches for the Norway national football team from 1970 to 1971.
