= Ilse Totzke =

German musician (1913–1987)

Ilse Sonja Totzke (4 August 1913 – 23 March 1987) was a German musician who had studied in Würzburg where she made a number of Jewish friends. After the Nuremberg Laws were enacted in 1935, she was reported to the Gestapo for associating with Jews but it was not until 1941 that she was warned not to continue these relationships. In late 1942, she nevertheless began a friendship with Ruth Basinski, a Jew, with whom she attempted to flee to Switzerland the following February. They reached the border but the Swiss guards handed them over to the Germans. Basinski was sent to the Auschwitz Concentration Camp while Totzke was returned to Würzburg. After insisting on maintaining relationships with her Jewish friends, she was sent to the Ravensbrück Concentration Camp in May 1943. A gifted flautist, Basinski became a member of the Auschwitz orchestra. Totzke survived until she was liberated in April 1945. Totzke was recognized as Righteous Among the Nations in March 1995.

== Biography ==
Ilse Sonje Totzke was born on 4 August 1913 in Strasbourg, then in Germany, the daughter of the Alsatian actress Sofie Wilhelmine Huth and Ernst Otto Totzke, who conducted the theatre orchestra. In 1919, she moved to Mannheim with her father while her mother remained in Strasbourg where she died in 1920. After completing her schooling in Ludwigshafen, in 1932 Ilse Totzke moved to Würzburg where she studied piano, violin and conducting at the Bavarian State Conservatory.

In November 1935, she was involved in a serious motorbike accident which was given as the reason she could not continue her studies. However it turned out that the real reason was that she continued her friendships with Jews, refused to give the Nazi greeting and that she was a lesbian.

Despite the Nuremberg Laws which were enacted in 1935, prohibiting relationships between Aryans and Jews, Totzke continued her friendships. She was repeatedly denounced to the Gestapo but it was not until October 1941 that she was taken in and forced to sign a declaration stating that further disobedience would lead to transfer to a concentration camp. In connection with a visit to Berlin in 1942, Totzke was asked by the wife of a Würzburg Jew to contact a Ruth Basinski, a former student of the Academy for the Science of Judaism, in order to send a message to her son. She met Basinski, befriended her and spent at least one night at her apartment. Once again in Berlin in February 1943, she tried to find Basinski but was told by neighbours that she was on Augustrasse, awaiting deportation. She convinced Basinski to flee with her to Switzerland and on 26 February they crossed the border near Durmenach but they were sent back by the Swiss border guards. The following night they made a further attempt but this time, the Swiss guards handed them over to the Germans. Basinski was sent back to Berlin and later deported to Auschwitz.

Totzke was sent back to Würzburg where, during her interrogation, she stated:

"I have been considering fleeing Germany for quite some time as I do not feel well under Hitler's rule. In particular, I have found the Nuremberg Laws to be incomprehensible and this is also the reason why I continued to maintain contact with the Jews who were my acquaintances."

She was subsequently sent to Ravensbrück Concentration Camp on 12 May 1943. As a flautist in the Ravensbrück orchestra, she survived until she was liberated by the Allies on 26 April 1945.

Little is known of her subsequent life but she apparently returned to Alsace where she died in Haguenau on 23 March 1987. On 23 March 1995, she was recognized by Yad Vashem as Righteous Among the Nations.
