= Arvid Lindberg =

Norwegian footballer (1902-1958)

Personal information
- Date of birth: 18 October 1902
- Date of death: 8 March 1958 (aged 55)

International career
Years	Team	Apps	(Gls)
1924–1927	Norway	7	(0)

Arvid Lindberg (18 October 1902 – 8 March 1958) was a Norwegian footballer. He played in seven matches for the Norway national football team from 1924 to 1927.
