= Petter Pedersen (footballer) =

Norwegian footballer (1895-1929)

Personal information
- Date of birth: 15 June 1895
- Date of death: 19 October 1929 (aged 34)

International career
Years	Team	Apps	(Gls)
1923	Norway	2	(0)

Petter Pedersen (15 June 1895 – 19 October 1929) was a Norwegian footballer. Pedersen played in two matches for the Norway national football team in 1923.
