= Willy Aronsen =

Norwegian footballer (1931-2014)

Personal information
- Date of birth: 8 March 1931
- Place of birth: Drammen, Norway
- Date of death: 18 November 2014 (aged 83)
- Position: Goalkeeper

International career
Years	Team	Apps	(Gls)
1954–1955	Norway	6	(0)

Willy Aronsen (8 March 1931 – 18 November 2014) was a Norwegian footballer. He played in six matches for the Norway national football team from 1954 to 1955.
