= Frithjof Tønnesen =

Norwegian footballer (1894-1959)

Personal information
- Date of birth: 13 June 1894
- Date of death: 1 September 1959 (aged 65)

International career
Years	Team	Apps	(Gls)
1912–1913	Norway	2	(0)

Frithjof Tønnesen (13 June 1894 – 1 September 1959) was a Norwegian footballer. He played in two matches for the Norway national football team in 1912 to 1913.
