= Dezső Grósz =

Hungarian footballer

Dezső "Dan" Grósz
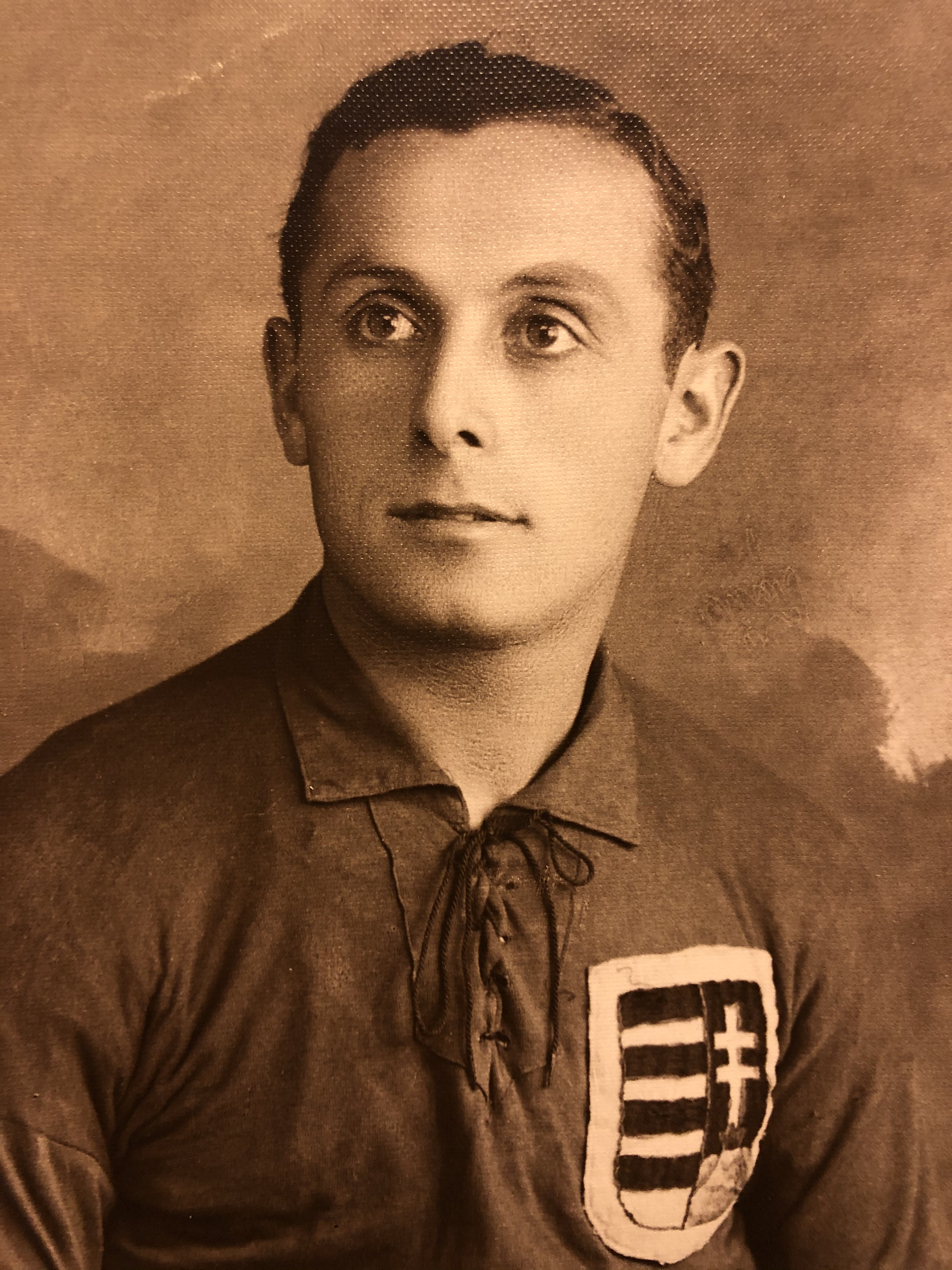

Personal information
- Full name: Dezső Grósz
- Date of birth: 19 September 1898
- Place of birth: Baja, Bacs-Kiskun, Hungary
- Date of death: 13 March 1987 (aged 88)
- Place of death: Los Angeles, California
- Position: Full back

Youth career
- 1916–1918: Vác-Újbuda LTC

Senior career*
Years	Team	Apps	(Gls)
1918–1926	Vác-Újbuda LTC	?	(?)
1926–1926	Hakoah Vienna	?	(?)
1927–1928	Brooklyn Wanderers	58	(?)
1928–1929	Philadelphia Field Club	18	(?)
1929–1930	Hakoah All-Stars	16	(?)
1930–1932	Brooklyn Wanderers	67	(?)
1933–1934	Brooklyn Football Club	9	(?)
1934–1937	New York Americans	64	(?)

International career^{‡}
1924–1926	Hungary	2	(?)
- * Club domestic league appearances and goals as of 2016-01-17 ‡ National team caps and goals as of 2016-01-17

Dezső (Dé-zhuh) "Dan" Grósz (19 September 1898 – 13 March 1987) was a Jewish Hungarian footballer who played for Vác-Újbuda LTC, and earned two appearances for the Hungary national team. Grósz played as a full-back for American Soccer League sides Brooklyn Wanderers and Philadelphia Field Club.

== Professional Soccer career ==
- Teams listed at right
- Appeared with the Hungary National Soccer Team in 1924 Paris Olympics
- 19 international caps

== Personal life ==
- Born to Avram Grosz and Fani Schreiber on 19 September 1898 in Baja, Bacs-Kiskun, Hungary
- Had nine siblings – Sofia, Irene, Sari, Kornel, Josa, Jeno, Josef, Lajos, Sandor, Frigyes
- Served as Lieutenant in Royal Hungarian army 1916–1920, including in Romania, Bukovina and Russia
- Emigrated to United States (New York City) in 1926
- Naturalized US Citizen
- Married Jeanne Elise Alexander, New York stage actress, 31 January 1930
- Moved permanently to California 1943
- One child – Phyllis June Grosz; two grandchildren – Barry and Julie
- Post-soccer career – bank teller for Public National Bank 1932–1943, Bank of America 1943–1963
