= Olaf Ruud =

Norwegian footballer (1892-1967)

Personal information
- Date of birth: 14 November 1892
- Date of death: 13 December 1967 (aged 75)

International career
Years	Team	Apps	(Gls)
1913	Norway	2	(0)

Olaf Ruud (14 November 1892 – 13 December 1967) was a Norwegian footballer. He played in two matches for the Norway national football team in 1913.
