= Per Bjørnø =

Norwegian footballer (1927-1979)

Personal information
- Date of birth: 28 May 1927
- Date of death: 2 March 1979 (aged 51)
- Position: Midfielder

International career
Years	Team	Apps	(Gls)
1949–1951	Norway	9	(0)

Per Bjørnø (28 May 1927 – 2 March 1979) was a Norwegian footballer. He played in nine matches for the Norway national football team from 1949 to 1951.
