= Andreas Johansen =

Norwegian footballer (1901-1978)

Personal information
- Date of birth: 29 November 1901
- Date of death: 12 September 1978 (aged 76)

International career
Years	Team	Apps	(Gls)
1924–1928	Norway	4	(0)

Andreas Johansen (29 November 1901 – 12 September 1978) was a Norwegian footballer. He played in four matches for the Norway national football team from 1924 to 1928.
