= Willy Sundblad =

Norwegian footballer (1917-1974)

Personal information
- Date of birth: 2 November 1917
- Date of death: 26 May 1974 (aged 56)

International career
Years	Team	Apps	(Gls)
1939–1948	Norway	2	(0)

Willy Sundblad (2 November 1917 – 26 May 1974) was a Norwegian footballer. He played in two matches for the Norway national football team from 1939 to 1948.
