= Victor Wells-Cole =

English cricketer and British Army officer

Personal information
- Full name: Victor Henry Wells-Cole
- Born: 29 April 1897; Lincoln, Lincolnshire, England
- Died: 8 March 1987 (aged 89); Huntingdon, Huntingdonshire, England
- Batting: Unknown
- Bowling: Unknown

Domestic team information
- Years: Team
- 1923/24: Europeans
- 1924: Lincolnshire

Career statistics
Competition	First-class
Matches	1
Runs scored	1
Batting average	0.50
100s/50s	–/–
Top score	1
Balls bowled	156
Wickets	3
Bowling average	29.00
5 wickets in innings	–
10 wickets in match	–
Best bowling	3/44
Catches/stumpings	1/–
- Source: Cricinfo, 16 February 2019

Victor Henry Wells-Cole MC (29 April 1897 – 8 March 1987) was an English first-class cricketer and British Army officer. Wells-Cole served in the King's Own Yorkshire Light Infantry during both world wars, in addition to playing first-class cricket for the Europeans cricket team in British India.

== Early life and World War I ==
Wells-Cole was born at Lincoln to Gervas Frederic Wells-Cole and his wife, Mary Beatrice Brook. He was educated at Winchester College. From Winchester he attended the Royal Military College, Sandhurst, graduating in April 1915, as World War I was well underway, and entering into the King's Own Yorkshire Light Infantry as a second lieutenant. He was promoted to the rank of lieutenant in April 1917, and was awarded the Military Cross in November 1917. He transferred to the Labour Corps in March 1918. The citation for his MC appeared in The London Gazette and reads as follows:

For conspicuous gallantry and devotion to duty. When the situation was very obscure during an action he went forward and ascertained the dispositions of the leading battalions and brought back most valuable information.

== First-class cricket and World War II ==
By 1923, Wells-Cole was back serving in the King's Own, gaining the rank of captain in March of that year. He served in British India the following year, playing in a first-class cricket match for the Europeans against the Hindus at Lahore. He batted twice during the match, scoring 1 run in the Europeans first-innings before he was dismissed by Brij Lall, while in their second-innings he was dismissed without scoring by Jagan Mehta. After going wicketless in the Hindus first-innings, he took figures of 3 for 44 in their second-innings. Returning to England shortly after, he played minor counties cricket for Lincolnshire in 1924, making three appearances in the Minor Counties Championship. He was promoted to major in September 1935. He later served during the Second World War, during which he was promoted to the rank of lieutenant colonel in April 1942. He retired from military service in April 1952.

== Personal life ==
Wells-Cole was married to Thomasina Scott Oliver, with the couple having one daughter. His brother, Neville Wells-Cole, was killed during the First World War. He died at Huntingdon in March 1987, at the age of 89, just a few weeks away from his 90th birthday.
