= Everard Baker =

Australian cricketer

Personal information
- Born: 28 July 1913; Melbourne, Australia
- Died: 30 March 1987 (aged 73); Melbourne, Australia

Domestic team information
- Years: Team
- 1936-1949: Victoria
- Source: Cricinfo, 22 November 2015

Everard Baker (28 July 1913 – 30 March 1987) was an Australian cricketer. He played 24 first-class cricket matches for Victoria between 1936 and 1949.

== See also ==
- List of Victoria first-class cricketers
