= Lars Martinsen =

Norwegian footballer (1908–1956)

Personal information
- Date of birth: 26 November 1908
- Date of death: 29 December 1956 (aged 48)

International career
Years	Team	Apps	(Gls)
1938–1939	Norway	5	(0)

Lars Martinsen (26 November 1908 – 29 December 1956) was a Norwegian footballer. He played in five matches for the Norway national football team from 1938 to 1939.
