= Gustav Rehn =

Norwegian footballer (1914-1987)

Personal information
- Date of birth: 12 December 1914
- Date of death: 18 March 1987 (aged 72)

International career
Years	Team	Apps	(Gls)
1945–1947	Norway	9	(0)

Gustav Rehn (12 December 1914 – 18 March 1987) was a Norwegian footballer. He played in nine matches for the Norway national football team from 1945 to 1947.
