= Jan Frøystein Halvorsen =

Norwegian judge

Jan Frøystein Halvorsen (23 October 1928 – 6 December 2016) was a Norwegian judge.

He was born in Oslo. He worked as a Supreme Court barrister from 1962, average adjuster from 1963, presiding judge in Eidsivating Court of Appeal from 1976 and as a Supreme Court Justice from 1983 to 1995. He was also a deputy member of the Labour Court of Norway.
