= Ragnar Halvorsen (footballer) =

Norwegian footballer (1893–1933)

Personal information
- Date of birth: 7 January 1893
- Date of death: 11 June 1933 (aged 40)

International career
Years	Team	Apps	(Gls)
1912–1913	Norway	2	(0)

Ragnar Halvorsen (7 January 1893 – 11 June 1933) was a Norwegian footballer. He played in two matches for the Norway national football team in 1912 to 1913.
