= Halvor Midtbø =

Halvor Midtbø (1883 in Holt – January 1985) was a Norwegian priest and temperance activist.

He was a member of the central committee of the International Federation of the Blue Cross for 32 years. He chaired the Norwegian branch of the Blue Cross from 1936 to 1960, and became an honorary member.

He was born in Holt Municipality. He attended the Norwegian Military Academy before enrolling in theology studies, graduating with the cand.theol. degree in 1908. He spent his professional career as a priest; he worked in Philadelphia from 1912 to 1920, was vicar in Glemmen from 1923 to 1936 and Torshov until 1953. He held the HM The King's Medal of Merit. He died in 1985, aged 101.
