= Erik Engsmyr =

Norwegian footballer (1929-2012)

Personal information
- Date of birth: 15 April 1929
- Place of birth: Greåker, Norway
- Date of death: 14 March 2012 (aged 82)
- Position: Midfielder

International career
Years	Team	Apps	(Gls)
1956–1960	Norway	2	(0)

Erik Engsmyr (15 April 1929 – 14 March 2012) was a Norwegian footballer. He played in two matches for the Norway national football team from 1956 to 1960.
