= Sverre Halvorsen (illustrator) =

Norwegian artist and animation creator (1891–1936)

Sverre Halvorsen (12 June 1891 – 11 April 1936) was a Norwegian illustrator.

He was born in Kristiania. He was a co-founder of Tegnerforbundet in 1916, and is mainly known as an illustrator for the humorous magazines Vikingen, Korsaren, Humoristen and Tyrihans.

Inspired by the German cartoonist Robert Leonard, Sverre Halvorsen made several animated films for director Randall at Circus Tivoli in Kristiania as early as 1913, but today only Roald Amundsen at the South Pole from this period exists. The drawings were made using chalk and blackboard. In Det nye Aar? he also used the so-called pixilation technique, i.e. animation of real objects and figures. He was also one of Norway's leading caricature and joke cartoonists, and helped to start the Cartoonists' Association in 1916.

== Selected animated films ==
- Oscar Mathiesen on ice skates at the Nordic Games (1913)
- Roald Amundsen at the South Pole (1913)
- The Declaration (1913)
- Christmas in Norway (1921)
- The New Year? (1921)
