= Harlyn O. Halvorson =

American microbiologist

- Born: Harlyn Odell Halvorson; May 17, 1925; Minneapolis, Minnesota, US
- Died: June 17, 2008 (aged 83); Woods Hole, Massachusetts, US
- Education: University of Minnesota; University of Illinois
- Spouse: Jean Ericksen
- Children: 1 son, 1 daughter
- Scientific career
- Fields: Microbiology
- Institutions: Brandeis University; Marine Biological Laboratory; University of Wisconsin–Madison
- Thesis: The problem of the precursor of induced enzyme synthesis (1952)
- Notable students: Amar Klar; James A. Shapiro

Harlyn Odell Halvorson (May 17, 1925 – June 17, 2008) was an American microbiologist who served as director of the Marine Biological Laboratory from 1987 to 1992. Previously, he was director of the Rosenstiel Basic Medical Sciences Research Center at Brandeis University from 1971 to 1987, and served as president of the American Society for Microbiology in 1977. He was elected a member of the National Academy of Medicine in 1989.
