= Sverre Eika =

Norwegian parish priest and military chaplain

Sverre Eika (29 August 1899 – 27 May 1971) was a Norwegian parish priest, military chaplain and footballer.

== Biography ==
He was born at Gjerpen Municipality in Telemark as a son of teacher Halvor Halvorsen (1867–1924) and Anne Halvorsdatter Eika (1866–1936). In 1934 he married Astri Lindboe (1910–1997). He finished his secondary education in 1918. He played for football club Odds BK during his youth, then SFK Lyn after moving to Kristiania (now Oslo), Norway. With Eika in the squad, the Lyn team was the runner-up in the 1923 Norwegian Football Cup. Eika also won two caps for Norway.

When he moved to Kristiania, it was in order to study, and he graduated from the Royal Frederick University (now University of Oslo) with a cand.theol. degree in 1923. He was ordained as a priest in 1924 and served as a substitute priest in Kristiansund and Trondheim.

He was hired in the Norwegian Church Abroad in 1927 and worked in Liverpool, England from 1927 to 1929 and the South Georgia Islands from 1929 to 1931. He was then stationed in Buenos Aires from 1931 to 1932 and 1933 to 1946, and in Philadelphia, Pennsylvania from 1932 to 1933. During the Second World War he supported the Allied powers, among others with fundraising and the pamphlet Hold deg norsk. From 1943 to the end of World War II he was stationed in the United Kingdom as a spiritual adviser for aircraft pilots-in-training, who were about to assist in the invasion of Europe. He was decorated with the Defence Medal 1940–1945 and in 1946 the Order of St. Olav (Knight, First Class).

In 1946 his family moved from Argentina to Oslo where he was hired as curate at Petrus, now Sofienberg Church. He was the vicar in Ris from 1953 to 1969. He was also a council member of Statens Velferdsråd for Handelsflåten from 1946 to 1964. He published one book, Under mange stjernehimler in 1966.

He died during May 1971 in Oslo; having survived a heart attack in 1965, but then collapsed again (from the preacher's pulpit) in March 1971. He was buried at Ris Church.
