= Emil Hansen (footballer) =

Norwegian footballer (1893–1971)

Personal information
- Date of birth: 2 August 1893
- Date of death: 25 September 1971 (aged 78)

International career
Years	Team	Apps	(Gls)
1916–1917	Norway	5	(0)

Emil Hansen (2 August 1893 – 25 September 1971) was a Norwegian footballer. He played in five matches for the Norway national football team from 1916 to 1917.
