= Roald Muggerud =

Norwegian footballer (1931–2024)

- Muggerud (foreground) with Lyn in 1964

Personal information
- Date of birth: 12 December 1931
- Place of birth: Oslo, Norway
- Date of death: 3 August 2024 (aged 92)
- Place of death: Oslo, Norway
- Position: Forward

Senior career*
Years	Team	Apps	(Gls)
1951–1964	Lyn		

International career
1958–1960	Norway	4	(0)
- * Club domestic league appearances and goals

Roald Muggerud (12 December 1931 – 3 August 2024) was a Norwegian footballer. A native of Oslo, Muggerud spent most of his career at Lyn, where he won the Norwegian League championship in 1964. He was mostly used as a forward, but also played occasionally in defence. Muggerud played in four matches for the Norway national team from 1958 to 1960. Muggerud died in Oslo on 3 August 2024, at the age of 92.
