= Einar Gundersen (footballer, born 1915) =

Norwegian footballer (1915-1997)

Personal information
- Date of birth: 25 September 1915
- Date of death: 12 May 1997 (aged 81)

International career
Years	Team	Apps	(Gls)
1939–1948	Norway	5	(0)

Einar Gundersen (25 September 1915 – 12 May 1997) was a Norwegian footballer. He played in five matches for the Norway national football team from 1939 to 1948.
