= Wilhelm Nielsen (Norwegian footballer) =

Norwegian footballer (1901-1960)

Personal information
- Date of birth: 22 May 1901
- Date of death: 9 January 1960 (aged 58)

International career
Years	Team	Apps	(Gls)
1922–1925	Norway	3	(2)

Wilhelm Nielsen (22 May 1901 – 9 January 1960) was a Norwegian footballer. He played in three matches for the Norway national football team from 1922 to 1925.
