= Domaslavice =

Domaslavice may refer to:

- Dolní Domaslavice, a village in Frýdek-Místek District, Czech Republic
- Horní Domaslavice, a village in Frýdek-Místek District, Czech Republic
