= Bludovice =

Bludovice may refer to places in the Moravian-Silesian Region of the Czech Republic:

- Bludovice (Havířov), a village and part of the city of Havířov
- Horní Bludovice, a municipality and village
  - Prostřední Bludovice, a village and part of Horní Bludovice
