= Soběšovice =

- Municipality
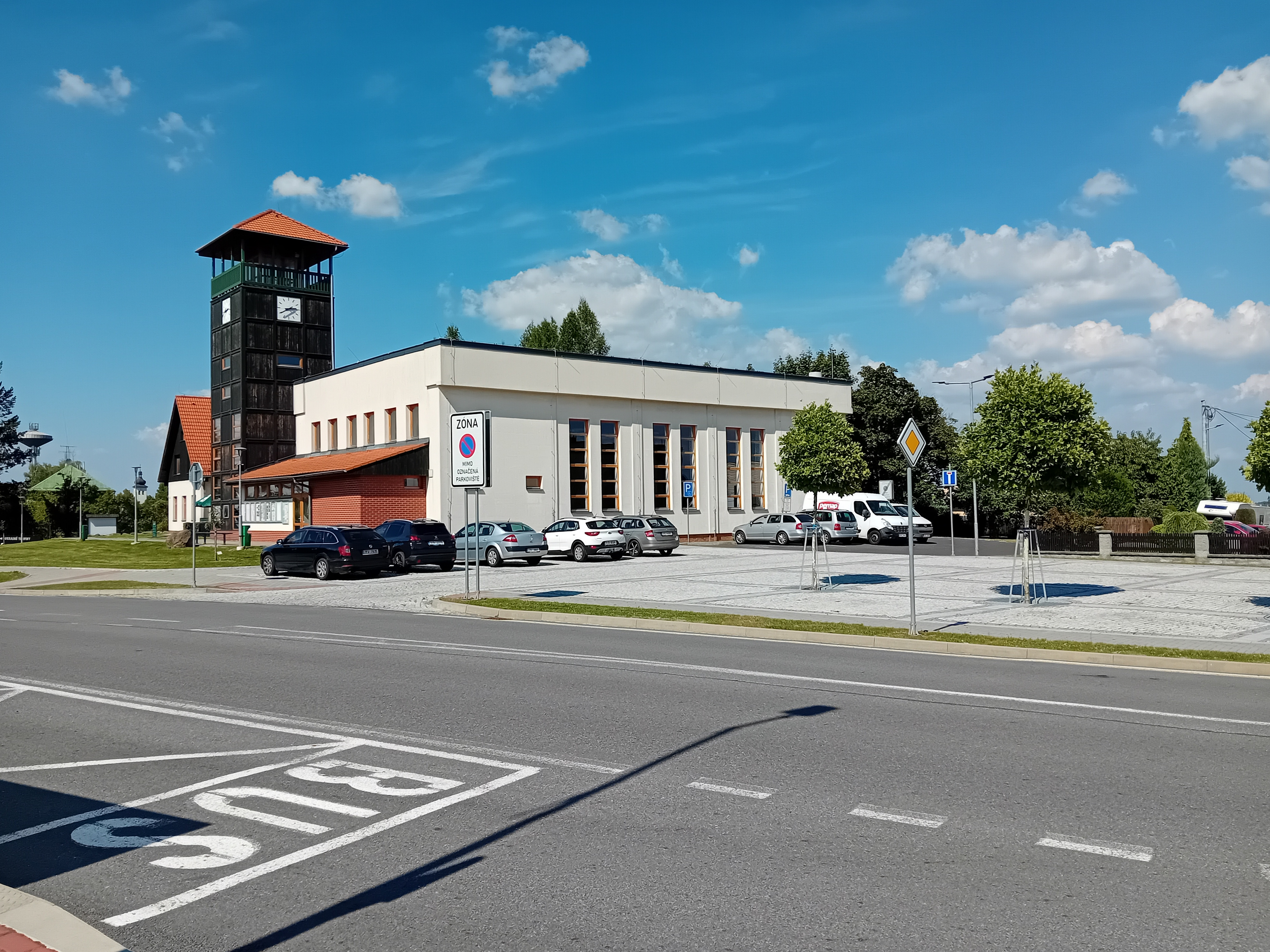
- Centre of Soběšovice

- Flag Coat of arms

- Location in the Czech Republic
- Coordinates: 49°43′30″N 18°27′58″E
- Country: Czech Republic
- Region: Moravian-Silesian
- District: Frýdek-Místek
- First mentioned: 1227

Area
  - Total: 3.66 km^{2} (1.41 sq mi)
- Elevation: 330 m (1,080 ft)

Population (2026-01-01)
  - Total: 965
  - Density: 264/km^{2} (683/sq mi)
- Time zone: UTC+1 (CET)
  - Summer (DST): UTC+2 (CEST)
- Postal code: 739 38
- Website: www.sobesovice.cz

Soběšovice (Polish: Szobiszowice, German: Schöbischowitz) is a municipality and village in Frýdek-Místek District in the Moravian-Silesian Region of the Czech Republic. It has about 1,000 inhabitants.

== Etymology ==
The name is patronymic in origin derived from personal name Soběk, which is considered the first coloniser and organiser of the village.

== Geography ==
Soběšovice is located about 8 kilometres (5 mi) northeast of Frýdek-Místek and 14 km (9 mi) southeast of Ostrava, in the historical region of Cieszyn Silesia. It lies in the Moravian-Silesian Foothills, on the shore of Žermanice Reservoir, which lies outside the municipal territory.

== History ==
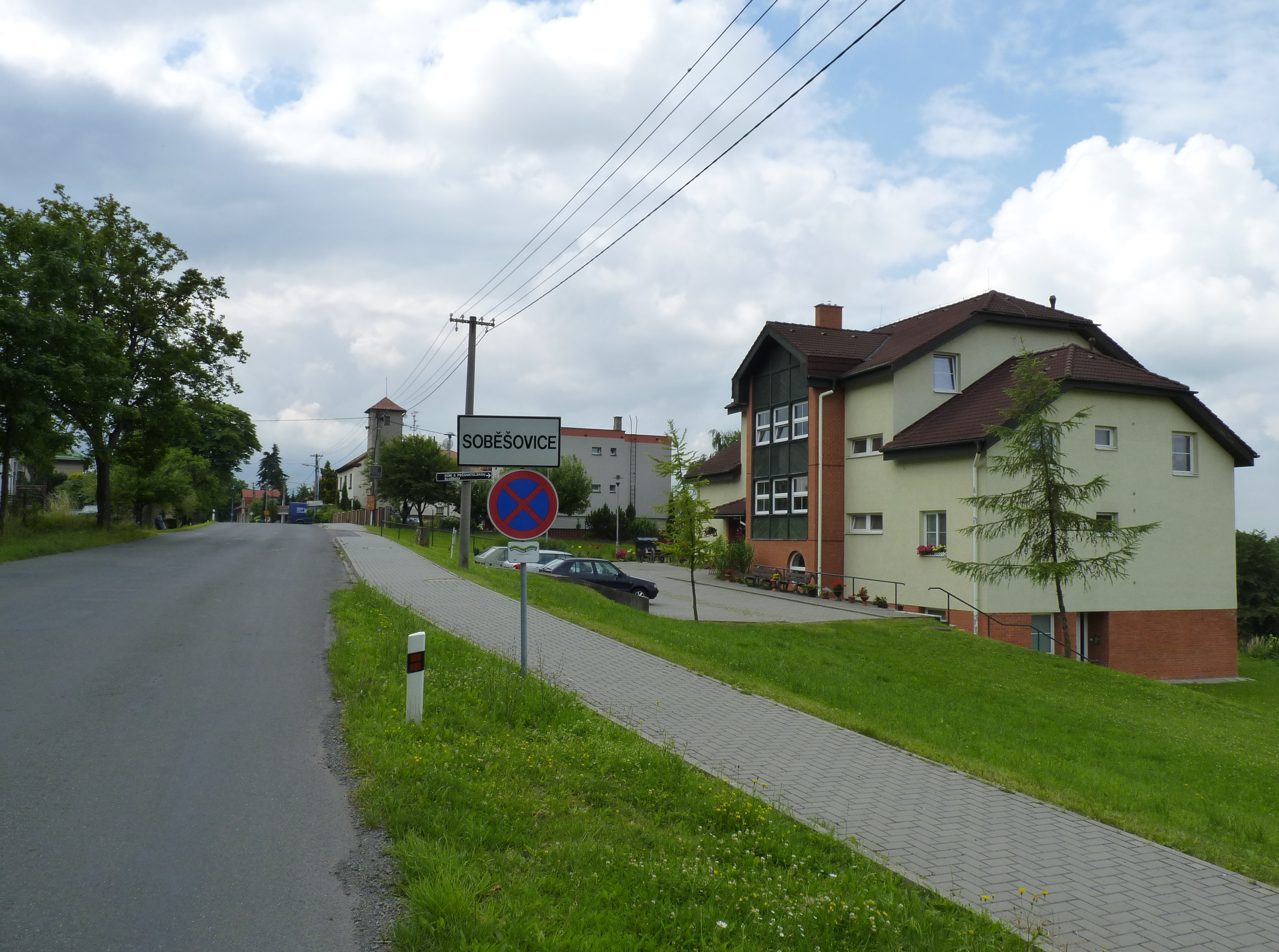
Entrance to the village

The first written mention of Soběšovice si from 1227, when there was a manor house called Dolní Soběšovice, owned by Soběk. Then the village was mentioned in a Latin document of Diocese of Wrocław called Liber fundationis episcopatus Vratislaviensis from around 1305. Politically the village belonged to the Duchy of Teschen. Originally it was located on both banks of the Lučina River.

The village became a seat of a Catholic parish, mentioned in the register of Peter's Pence payment from 1447 among 50 parishes of Teschen deanery as Sobieschowicz. After 1540s Protestant Reformation prevailed in the Duchy of Teschen and a local Catholic church was taken over by Lutherans. It was taken from them (as one from around fifty buildings in the region) by a special commission and given back to the Roman Catholic Church on 25 March 1654. The parish was not reestablished afterwards and Soběšovice were affiliated to the parish of Dolní Domaslavice.

At the end of the 16th century, two separate villages Dolní Soběšovice and Horní Soběšovice ('upper Soběšovice' and 'lower Soběšovice') with different owners were distinguished. In 1788, an old wooden church from 1681 was replaced by a new brick one. In 1828, Bernard Primus bought both Soběšovice and merged them.

After Revolutions of 1848 in the Austrian Empire a modern municipal division was introduced in the re-established Austrian Silesia. Soběšovice was subscribed to the political and legal district of Cieszyn. According to the censuses conducted in 1880–1910, the population of the municipality dropped from 949 in 1880 to 863 in 1910 with a majority being native Czech-speakers (growing from 97.7% in 1880 to 98.1% in 1900 then dropping to 89.5%) accompanied by a Polish-speaking minority (up to 1900 between 1.6% and 2.2% then 91 or 10.5% in 1910) and only in 1880 accompanied by German-speaking people (7 or 0.7%). In terms of religion in 1910 the majority were Roman Catholics (94.6%), followed by Protestants (5.4%).

After World War I, Polish–Czechoslovak War and the division of Cieszyn Silesia in 1920, the municipality became part of Czechoslovakia. It was annexed by Nazi Germany at the beginning of World War II. After the war it was restored to Czechoslovakia.

The construction of Žermanice Reservoir on the Lučina River in years 1951–1958 led to a partial flooding of Soběšovice, including the historical centre of the village with dozens of houses, a church, and a school. It also led to detachment of the eastern territory of the municipality on the left bank of the Lučina to form a new municipality of Lučina in 1956.

== Demographics ==
Historical population

Year	Pop.	±%
1869	1,106	—
1880	949	−14.2%
1890	936	−1.4%
1900	918	−1.9%
1910	863	−6.0%

Year	Pop.	±%
1921	865	+0.2%
1930	959	+10.9%
1950	890	−7.2%
1961	593	−33.4%
1970	619	+4.4%

Year	Pop.	±%
1980	696	+12.4%
1991	709	+1.9%
2001	817	+15.2%
2011	808	−1.1%
2021	954	+18.1%

Source: Censuses

== Transport ==
There are no railways or major roads passing through the municipality.

== Sights ==
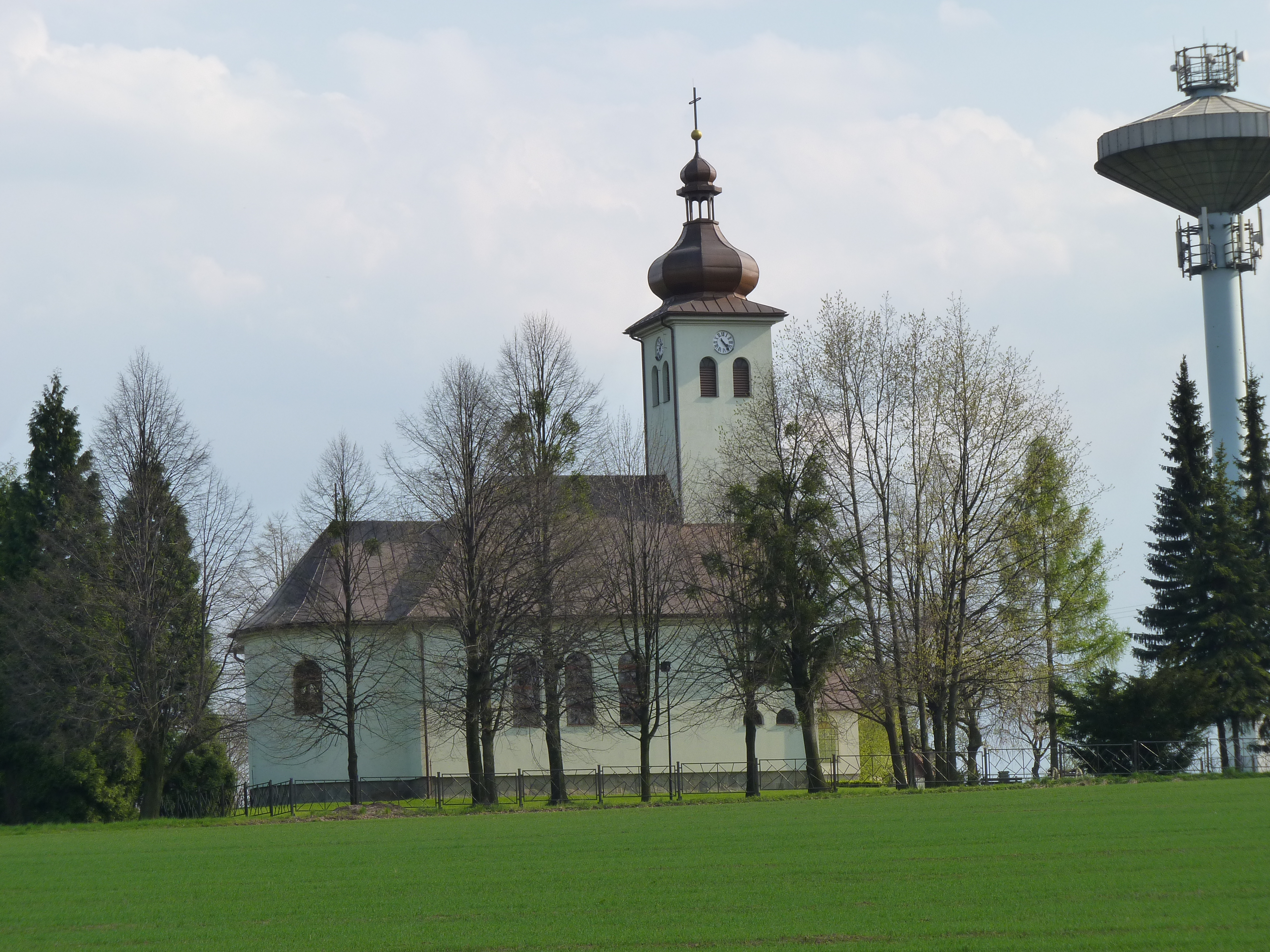
Church of the Visitation of the Virgin Mary

The main landmark of Soběšovice is the Church of the Visitation of the Virgin Mary. It is a modern church, built in 1961.

== Notable people ==
- Jan Kasper (1932–2005), ice hockey player
