= Dobratice =

- Municipality
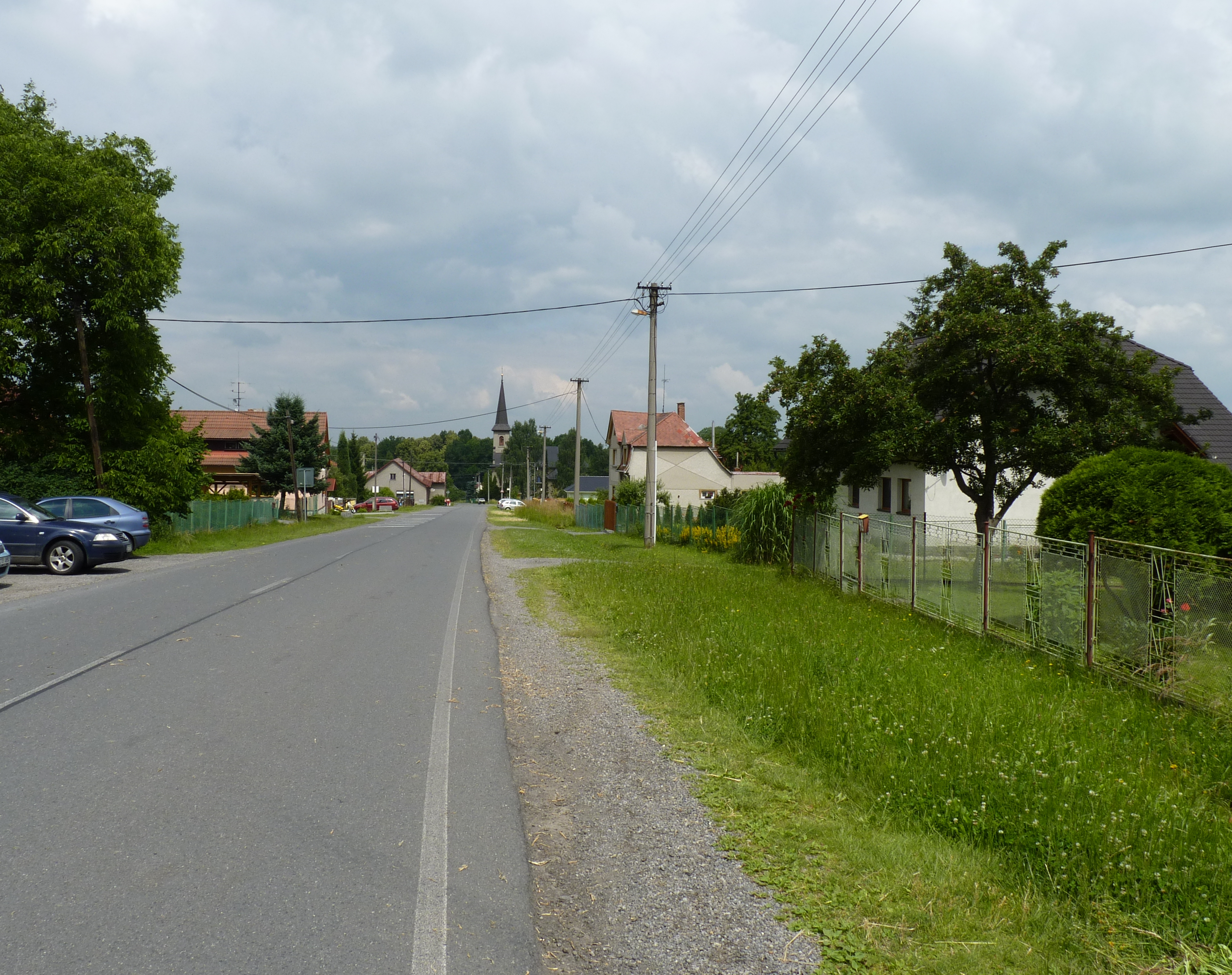
- Main road

- Flag Coat of arms

- Location in the Czech Republic
- Coordinates: 49°39′37″N 18°29′32″E
- Country: Czech Republic
- Region: Moravian-Silesian
- District: Frýdek-Místek
- First mentioned: 1580

Area
  - Total: 7.05 km^{2} (2.72 sq mi)
- Elevation: 345 m (1,132 ft)

Population (2026-01-01)
  - Total: 1,383
  - Density: 196/km^{2} (508/sq mi)
- Time zone: UTC+1 (CET)
  - Summer (DST): UTC+2 (CEST)
- Postal code: 739 51
- Website: www.dobratice.cz

Dobratice (German: Dobratitz, Polish: Dobracice) is a municipality and village in Frýdek-Místek District in the Moravian-Silesian Region of the Czech Republic. It has about 1,400 inhabitants.

== Etymology ==
The name is derived from the personal name Dobrata, who was probably the founded of the village. In 1749, the name of the village was written as Dobrachtitz.

== Geography ==
Dobratice is located about 9 kilometres (6 mi) east of Frýdek-Místek and 21 km (13 mi) southeast of Ostrava. It lies in the historical region of Cieszyn Silesia, in the Moravian-Silesian Foothills. The Lučina River flows through the municipality.

== History ==
Dobratice was probably founded around 1512. It belonged then to the Duchy of Teschen. The first written mention of Dobratice is from 1580, when it was owned by the Tluk of Tošanovice family.

After Revolutions of 1848 in the Austrian Empire a modern municipal division was introduced in the re-established Austrian Silesia. Dobratice as a municipality was subscribed to the political and legal district of Cieszyn. According to the censuses conducted in 1880–1910, the population of the municipality grew from 908 in 1880 to 954 in 1910 with a majority being native Czech-speakers (at least 82.8% in 1910, at most 95% in 1890), followed by Polish-speaking minority (at least 5% in 1890, at most 15.8% in 1910) and German-speaking people (at most 1.1% in 1880) and in 1910 there were also 1.3% people speaking another languages. In terms of religion in 1910 majority were Roman Catholics (89.7%), followed by Protestants (8.9%).

The Church of Saints Philip and James was consecrated in 1865, which led to the separation from the Horní Domaslavice parish in 1868. In 1888, the railway was opened.

After World War I, Polish–Czechoslovak War and the division of Cieszyn Silesia in 1920, it became a part of Czechoslovakia. Following the Munich Agreement, in October 1938 together with the Trans-Olza region it was annexed by Poland, administratively adjoined to Cieszyn County of Silesian Voivodeship. It was then annexed by Nazi Germany at the beginning of World War II. After the war it was restored to Czechoslovakia.

== Demographics ==
Historical population

Year	Pop.	±%
1869	1,213	—
1880	1,058	−12.8%
1890	969	−8.4%
1900	933	−3.7%
1910	1,108	+18.8%

Year	Pop.	±%
1921	1,031	−6.9%
1930	1,205	+16.9%
1950	1,008	−16.3%
1961	1,091	+8.2%
1970	1,011	−7.3%

Year	Pop.	±%
1980	1,040	+2.9%
1991	962	−7.5%
2001	1,036	+7.7%
2011	1,117	+7.8%
2021	1,304	+16.7%

Source: Censuses

== Transport ==
The D48 motorway from Frýdek-Místek to the Czech–Polish border in Český Těšín runs through the municipality.

== Sights ==
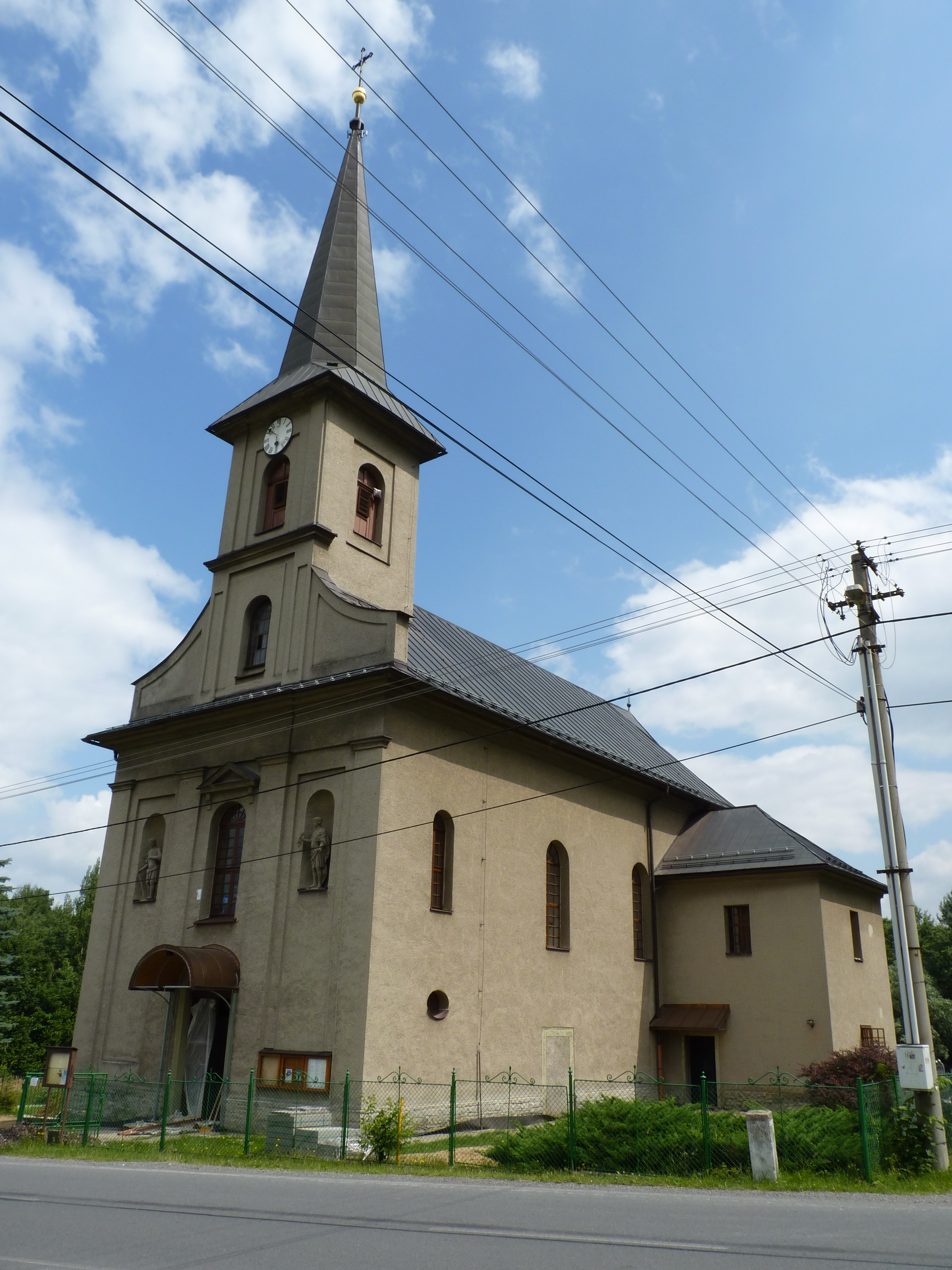
Church of Saints Philip and James

The main landmark of Dobratice is the Church of Saints Philip and James. It was built in 1863–1865. The tower was raised in 1894 and a pyramid was placed on it.

== Twin towns – sister cities ==
Dobratice is twinned with:

- Zábiedovo, Slovakia
