= Žermanice =

- Municipality
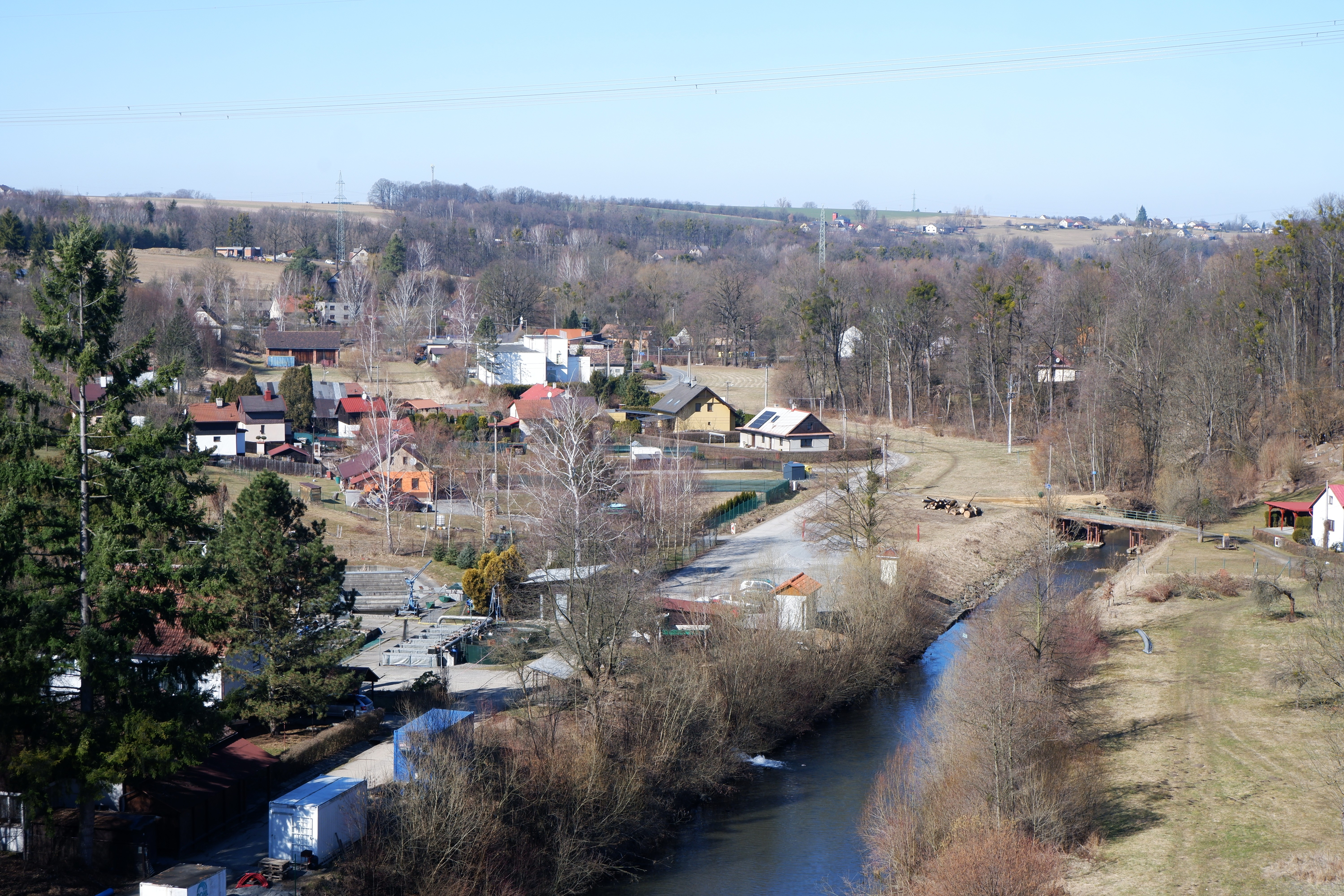
- Lučina River in Žermanice

- Flag Coat of arms

- Location in the Czech Republic
- Coordinates: 49°44′18″N 18°26′34″E
- Country: Czech Republic
- Region: Moravian-Silesian
- District: Frýdek-Místek
- First mentioned: 1450

Area
  - Total: 3.43 km^{2} (1.32 sq mi)
- Elevation: 268 m (879 ft)

Population (2026-01-01)
  - Total: 391
  - Density: 114/km^{2} (295/sq mi)
- Time zone: UTC+1 (CET)
  - Summer (DST): UTC+2 (CEST)
- Postal code: 739 37
- Website: www.obeczermanice.cz

Žermanice is a municipality and village in Frýdek-Místek District in the Moravian-Silesian Region of the Czech Republic. It has about 400 inhabitants.

== Geography ==
Žermanice is located about 8 kilometres (5 mi) northeast of Frýdek-Místek and 13 km (8 mi) southeast of Ostrava. It lies in the historical region of Cieszyn Silesia, in the western part of the Moravian-Silesian Foothills. The highest point is the hill U Třešně at 345 m (1,132 ft) above sea level.

The municipality is situated on the banks of the Lučina River and on the shore of Žermanice Reservoir, which was built in 1951–1957, but lies just outside the municipal territory.

Žermanický lom is a 2 ha (5 acres) large wetland ecosystem protected as a nature monument, where several species of critically endangered plants grow.

== History ==
The village could have been founded by Benedictine monks from the Orlová monastery and was first mentioned in 1450 as Zilmanicze.

In 1461, it was owned by Jan Hunt of Kornice, the owner of neighbouring Horní Bludovice. In 1483, the village was inherited by his two sons. Before the end of the 15th century, it was bought by Jan Trnka of Racibórz, a tenant of Frýdek, who then bestowed the village upon the town. Hence, as a property of Frýdek, it was as a special case a part of the Frýdek state country that was split from the Duchy of Teschen in 1573, which was a part of the Kingdom of Bohemia, since 1526 a part of the Habsburg monarchy. After World War I and fall of Austria-Hungary, it became a part of Czechoslovakia.

== Demographics ==
Historical population

Year	Pop.	±%
1869	324	—
1880	293	−9.6%
1890	320	+9.2%
1900	312	−2.5%
1910	261	−16.3%

Year	Pop.	±%
1921	278	+6.5%
1930	309	+11.2%
1950	244	−21.0%
1961	257	+5.3%
1970	234	−8.9%

Year	Pop.	±%
1980	210	−10.3%
1991	206	−1.9%
2001	215	+4.4%
2011	287	+33.5%
2021	357	+24.4%

Source: Censuses

== Transport ==
There are no railways or major roads passing through the municipality.

== Sights ==
There are no protected cultural monuments in the municipality. The Chapel of the Nativity of the Virgin Mary was built in 1843–1848.
