= Wiesław Adam Berger =

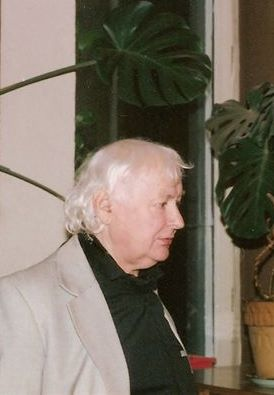
- Born: 6 June 1926; Ostrava, Czechoslovakia
- Died: 15 January 1998 (aged 71); Ostrava, Czech Republic
- Occupation: Writer
- Writing career
- Language: Polish

Wiesław Adam Berger (6 June 1926 – 15 January 1998) was a Polish Czech writer. He was connected with the Trans-Olza region of Cieszyn Silesia.

== Biography ==
Berger was born on 6 June 1926 in Ostrava. He lived from 1927 to 1940 (and also several years after World War II) in the village of Dolní Bludovice. During World War II he was deported to Nazi Germany as a forced laborer. Later he attended Cyprian Norwid Polish Liceum in Villard-de-Lans and another Polish school in Houilles, France; and after the war Juliusz Słowacki Polish Gymnasium in Orlová. Berger worked since 1948 as an electrician in the theatre in Ostrava. He was a member of PZKO (Polish Cultural and Educational Union) and several literary organizations.

Berger had unusual ability to rise above regional problems and he is notable among the Polish writers of Trans-Olza, because his works were not so much influenced by regional themes; the most notable exception being his youth spent around the Lučina River in Dolní Bludovice, which is reflected in several of his works. Berger often called for Polish and Czech cooperation and also often used French themes in his works.

Berger died 15 January 1998 in Ostrava, at the age of 71.

== Works ==
=== Short stories collections ===
- Świerszcze w głowie (1979)
- Zmysły (1981)
- Idę. Concorde (1984)
- Most nad Łucyną (1987)
- Okay (1988)
- Marienbad (1995)
- Za późno (1996)
