= Lučina (Frýdek-Místek District) =

- Municipality
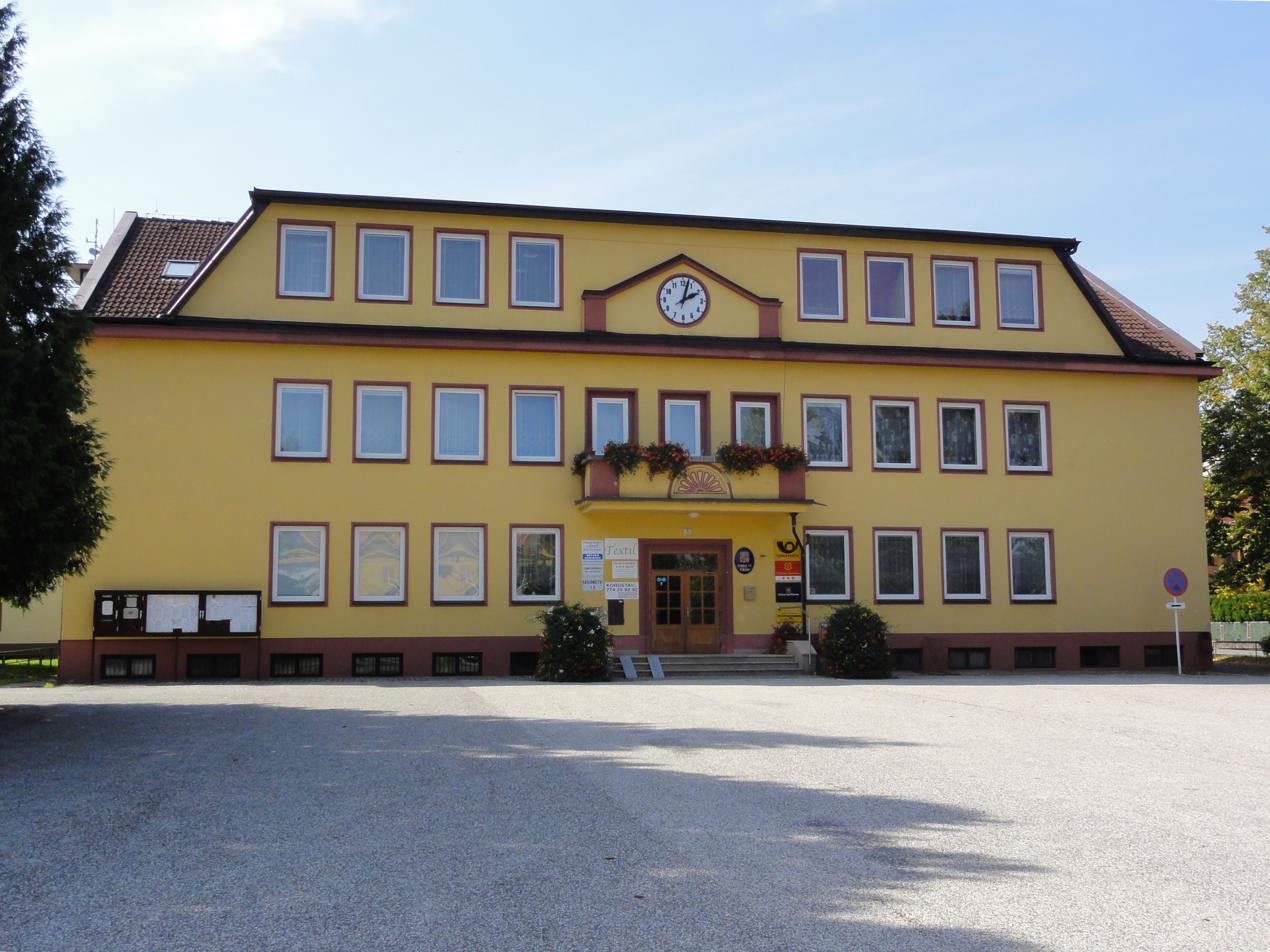
- Municipal office

- Flag Coat of arms

- Location in the Czech Republic
- Coordinates: 49°42′57″N 18°26′59″E
- Country: Czech Republic
- Region: Moravian-Silesian
- District: Frýdek-Místek
- Established: 1956

Area
  - Total: 7.44 km^{2} (2.87 sq mi)
- Elevation: 312 m (1,024 ft)

Population (2026-01-01)
  - Total: 1,596
  - Density: 215/km^{2} (556/sq mi)
- Time zone: UTC+1 (CET)
  - Summer (DST): UTC+2 (CEST)
- Postal code: 739 39
- Website: www.lucina.cz

Lučina is a municipality and village in Frýdek-Místek District in the Moravian-Silesian Region of the Czech Republic. It has about 1,600 inhabitants.

== Geography ==
Lučina is located about 7 kilometres (4 mi) northeast of Frýdek-Místek and 15 km (9 mi) southeast of Ostrava. It lies in the Moravian-Silesian Foothills, in the historical region of Cieszyn Silesia. The village is located on the western shore of Žermanice Reservoir, which is entirely located in the municipal territory of Lučina.

== History ==
The construction of Žermanice Reservoir on the Lučina River necessitated resettlement of the population of the villages of Dolní Domaslavice and Soběšovice, which were going to be partly flooded. Therefore, a new village was founded on the western bank of the nascent reservoir to accommodate resettled population, encompassing former western territories of the aforementioned municipalities. The Lučina municipality was officially established on 8 January 1956.

== Demographics ==
Historical population

Year	Pop.	±%
1869	218	—
1880	186	−14.7%
1890	167	−10.2%
1900	162	−3.0%
1910	176	+8.6%

Year	Pop.	±%
1921	162	−8.0%
1930	162	+0.0%
1950	118	−27.2%
1961	979	+729.7%
1970	968	−1.1%

Year	Pop.	±%
1980	1,062	+9.7%
1991	1,143	+7.6%
2001	1,139	−0.3%
2011	1,188	+4.3%
2021	1,477	+24.3%

Source: Censuses

== Transport ==
There are no railways or major roads passing through the municipality.

== Sights ==
There are no protected cultural monuments in the municipality.
