= Žermanice Reservoir =

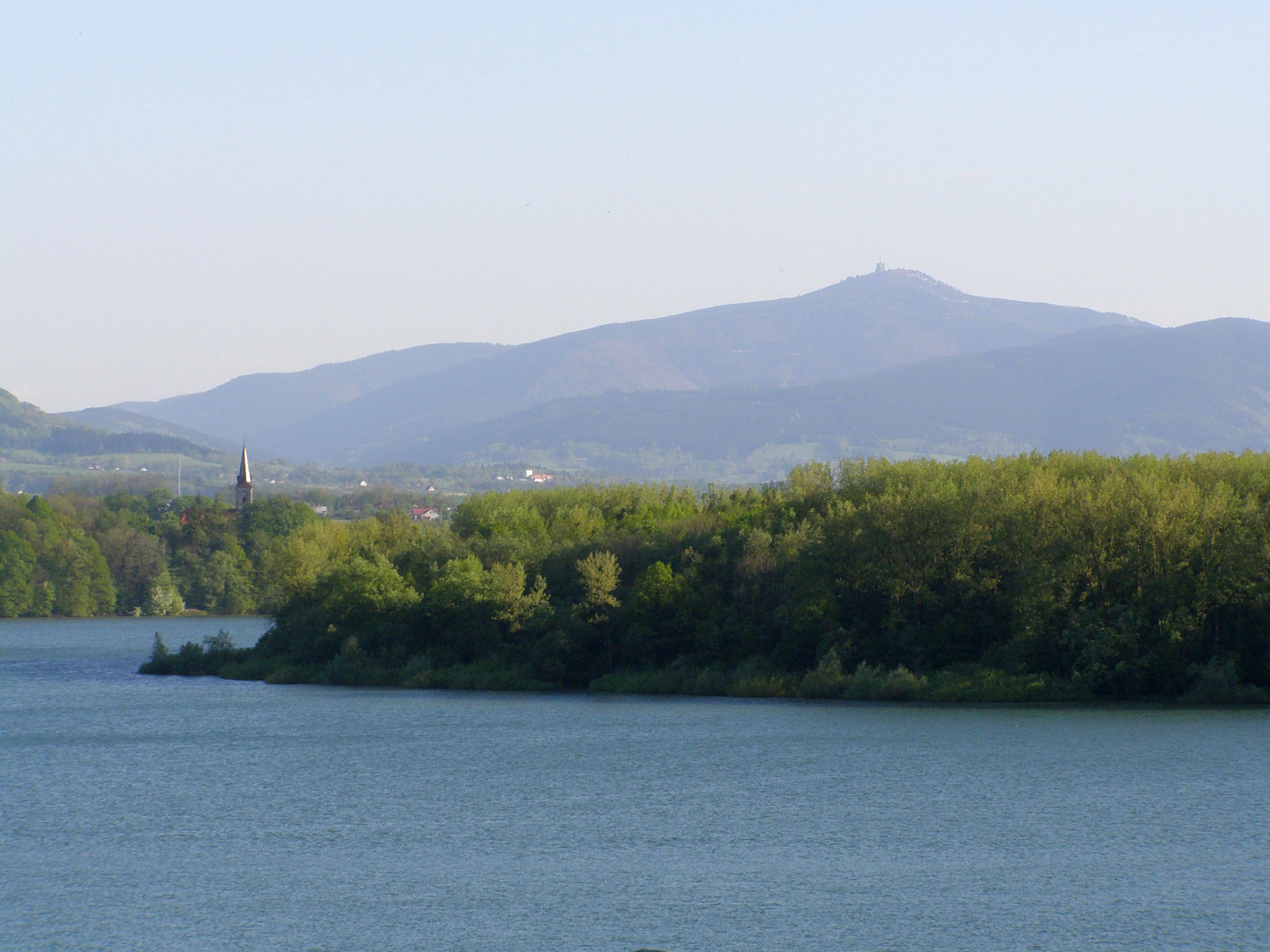
- The reservoir viewed from Soběšovice

- Location within Czech Republic
- Location: Lučina, Moravian-Silesian Region
- Coordinates: 49°43′10″N 18°27′43″E
- Type: reservoir
- Primary inflows: Lučina
- Primary outflows: Lučina
- Basin countries: Czech Republic
- Surface area: 2.48 km^{2} (0.96 sq mi)
- Max. depth: 28 m (92 ft)
- Water volume: 25.3×10^{6} m^{3} (20,500 acre⋅ft)

Žermanice Reservoir (Czech: vodní nádrž Žermanice) is a water reservoir and dam in Lučina in the Moravian-Silesian Region of the Czech Republic. It was built on the Lučina River in 1951–1957 on an area of 2.48 km^{2} (0.96 sq mi).

The reservoir is named after the village of Žermanice. In addition to Lučina on the western shore and Žermanice on the northern shore, there are also the villages of Dolní Domaslavice and Soběšovice on the eastern shore of the reservoir. The reservoir is a popular spot for water sports and other recreational activities. The reservoir is also used to supply water for factories in Ostrava and Paskov.
