= Dolní Domaslavice =

- Municipality
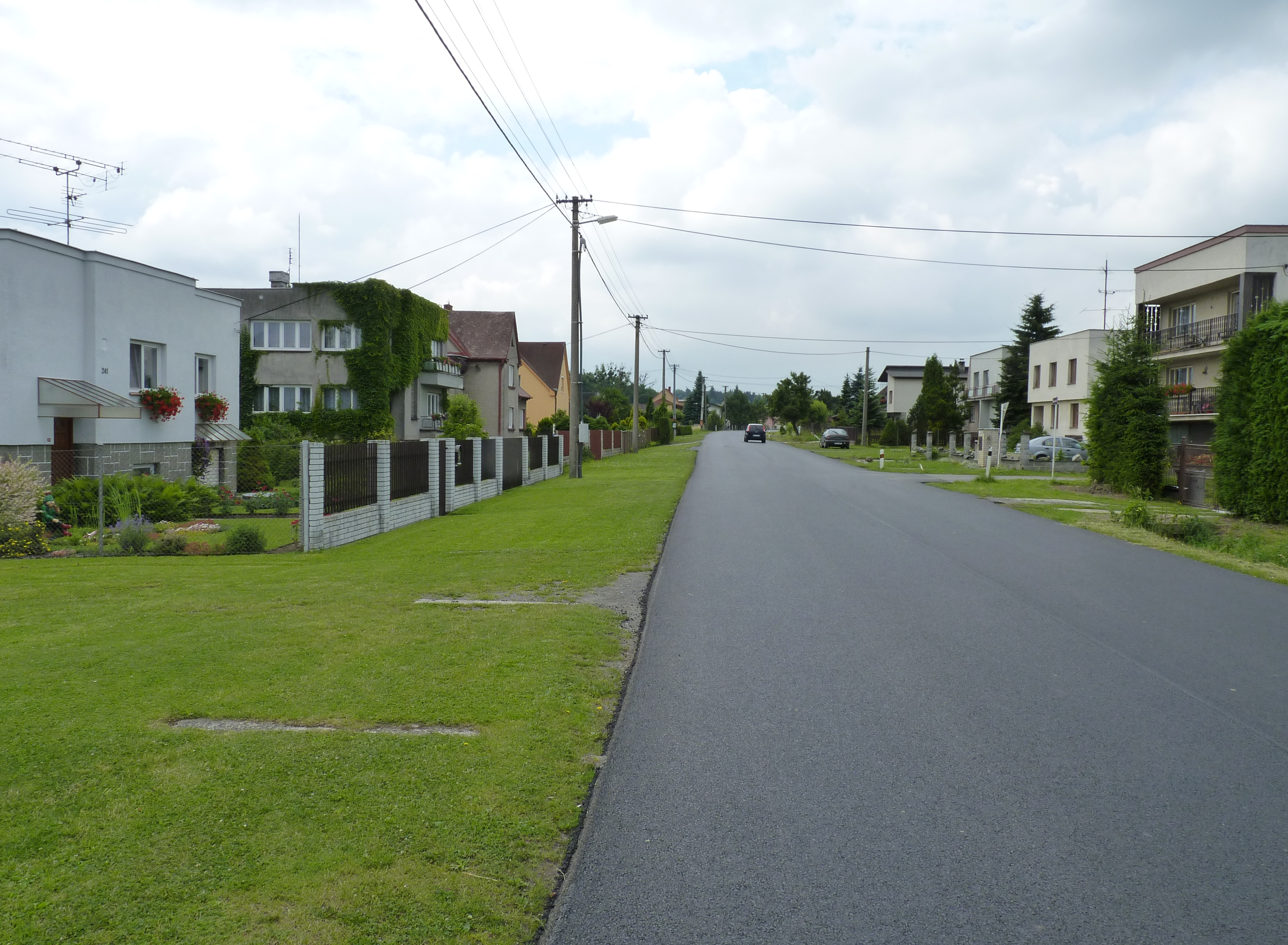
- Housing in Dolní Domaslavice

- Flag Coat of arms

- Location in the Czech Republic
- Coordinates: 49°42′35″N 18°28′35″E
- Country: Czech Republic
- Region: Moravian-Silesian
- District: Frýdek-Místek
- First mentioned: 1305

Area
  - Total: 7.36 km^{2} (2.84 sq mi)
- Elevation: 345 m (1,132 ft)

Population (2026-01-01)
  - Total: 1,467
  - Density: 199/km^{2} (516/sq mi)
- Time zone: UTC+1 (CET)
  - Summer (DST): UTC+2 (CEST)
- Postal code: 739 38
- Website: www.ddomaslavice.cz

Dolní Domaslavice (Polish: Domasłowice Dolne, German: Nieder Domaslowitz) is a municipality and village in Frýdek-Místek District in the Moravian-Silesian Region of the Czech Republic. It has about 1,500 inhabitants.

== Geography ==
Dolní Domaslavice is located about 9 kilometres (6 mi) east of Frýdek-Místek and 16 km (10 mi) southeast of Ostrava. It lies in the historical region of Cieszyn Silesia, in the Moravian-Silesian Foothills. The municipality is situated on the eastern shore of Žermanice Reservoir.

== History ==
The first written mention of Dolní Domaslavice is in a Latin document of Diocese of Wrocław called Liber fundationis episcopatus Vratislaviensis from around 1305 as item in Domaslawitz utroque. It meant that there were already two villages of that name (utroque meaning 'both' in Latin), the other being Horní Domaslavice. Politically, Dolní Domaslavice belonged initially to the Duchy of Teschen, from 1327 a fee of the Kingdom of Bohemia.

After Revolutions of 1848 in the Austrian Empire, a modern municipal division was introduced in the re-established Austrian Silesia. The village as a municipality was subscribed to the political and legal district of Cieszyn. According to the censuses conducted in 1880–1910, the population of the municipality grew from 955 in 1880 to 1061 in 1910 with a majority being native Czech-speakers (between 88.3% and 92.4%) accompanied by a small Polish-speaking minority (between 3.2% and 10.6%) and German-speaking people (at most 41 or 4.4% in 1880). In terms of religion in 1910 majority were Roman Catholics (94.3%), followed by Protestants (53 or 5%) and Jews (7 people).

After World War I, Polish–Czechoslovak War and the division of Cieszyn Silesia in 1920, it became a part of Czechoslovakia. Following the Munich Agreement, in October 1938 together with the Trans-Olza region it was annexed by Poland, administratively adjoined to Cieszyn County of Silesian Voivodeship. It was then annexed by Nazi Germany at the beginning of World War II. After the war, it was restored to Czechoslovakia.

The construction of Žermanice Reservoir on Lučina River in the years 1951–1958 led to a partial flooding of Dolní Domaslavice, including the historical centre of the village, and detachment of the eastern territory of the municipality to form a new municipality of Lučina in 1956. Some hamlets from the surrounding municipalities were connected to Dolní Domaslavice.

== Demographics ==
Historical population

Year	Pop.	±%
1869	1,064	—
1880	1,025	−3.7%
1890	932	−9.1%
1900	926	−0.6%
1910	1,127	+21.7%

Year	Pop.	±%
1921	1,030	−8.6%
1930	1,046	+1.6%
1950	1,056	+1.0%
1961	866	−18.0%
1970	848	−2.1%

Year	Pop.	±%
1980	880	+3.8%
1991	860	−2.3%
2001	920	+7.0%
2011	1,184	+28.7%
2021	1,393	+17.7%

Source: Censuses

== Transport ==
There are no railways or major roads passing through the municipality.

== Sights ==
The only protected cultural monument in the municipality is a sandstone crucifix from 1880.
