= Horní Bludovice =

- Municipality
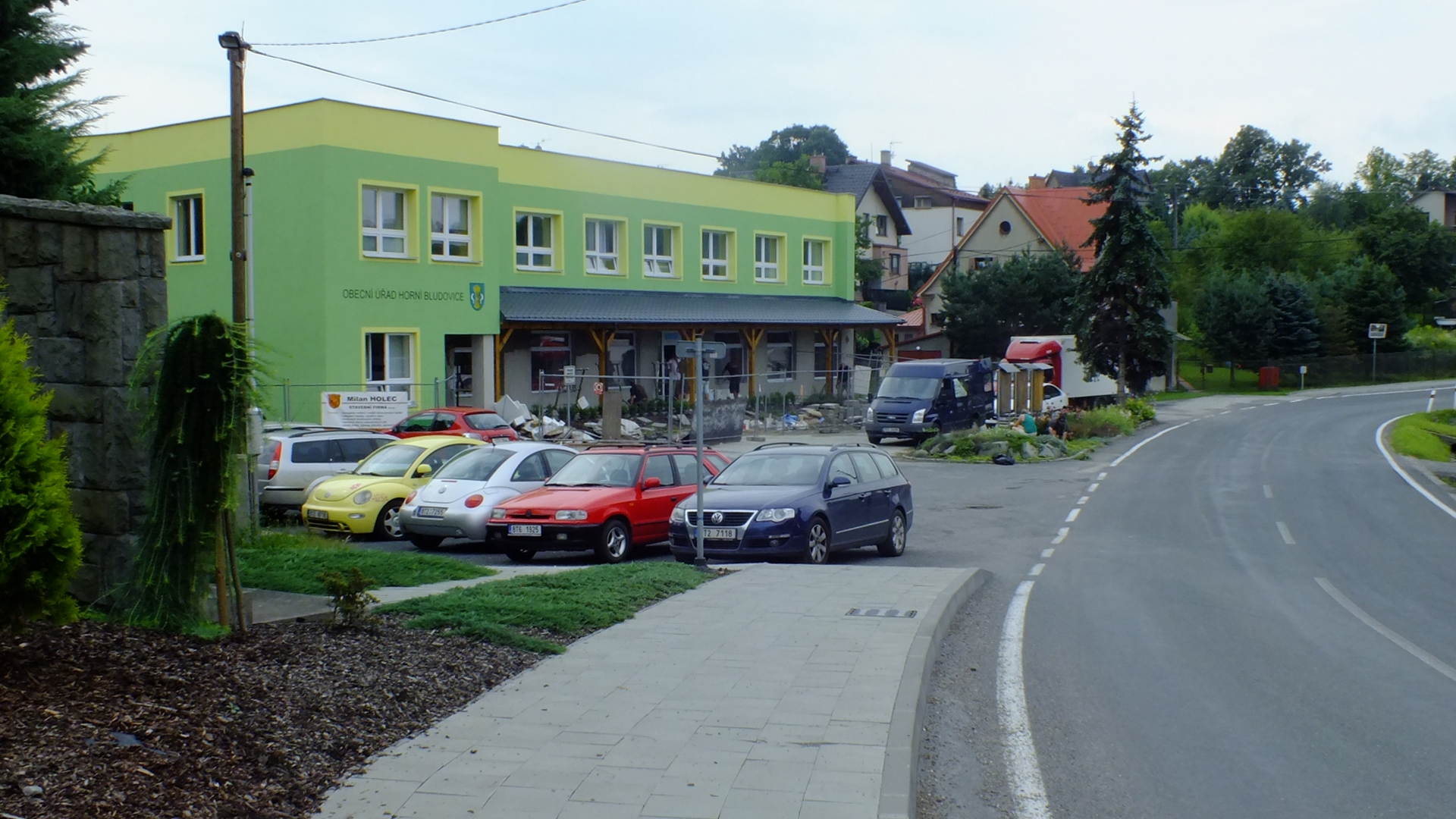
- Municipal office

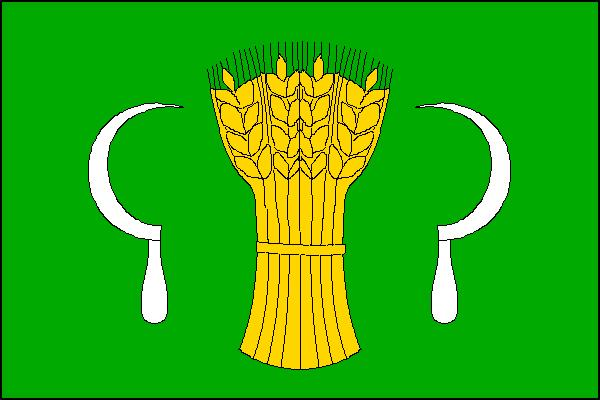
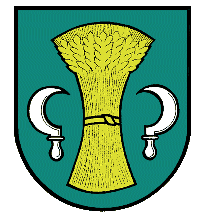
- Flag Coat of arms

- Location in the Czech Republic
- Coordinates: 49°44′59″N 18°26′13″E
- Country: Czech Republic
- Region: Moravian-Silesian
- District: Karviná
- First mentioned: 1335

Area
  - Total: 8.98 km^{2} (3.47 sq mi)
- Elevation: 280 m (920 ft)

Population (2026-01-01)
  - Total: 2,582
  - Density: 288/km^{2} (745/sq mi)
- Time zone: UTC+1 (CET)
  - Summer (DST): UTC+2 (CEST)
- Postal code: 739 37
- Website: www.horni-bludovice.cz

Horní Bludovice (Polish: Błędowice Górne, German: Ober Bludowitz) is a municipality and village in Karviná District in the Moravian-Silesian Region of the Czech Republic. It has about 2,600 inhabitants.

== Administrative division ==
Horní Bludovice consists of two municipal parts (in brackets population according to the 2021 census):

- Horní Bludovice (1,128)
- Prostřední Bludovice (1,349)

== Geography ==
Horní Bludovice is located about 3 kilometres (2 mi) west of Karviná and 12 km (7 mi) east of Ostrava, in the historical region of Cieszyn Silesia. The municipality lies mostly in the Moravian-Silesian Foothills, but Prostřední Bludovice extends into the Ostrava Basin. The highest point is the hill Kohout at 331 m (1,086 ft) above sea level. The Lučina River flows through the municipality.

== History ==
The village of Bludovice (which was later known as Dolní Bludovice) was first mentioned in 1335. The division to Horní and Dolní Bludovice (Lower and Upper Bludovice) developed in the 15th century.

Politically the village belonged then to the Duchy of Teschen within the Kingdom of Bohemia, which after 1526 became part of the Habsburg monarchy.

== Demographics ==
Historical population

Year	Pop.	±%
1869	1,289	—
1880	1,289	+0.0%
1890	1,271	−1.4%
1900	1,339	+5.4%
1910	1,353	+1.0%

Year	Pop.	±%
1921	1,425	+5.3%
1930	1,507	+5.8%
1950	1,465	−2.8%
1961	1,613	+10.1%
1970	1,563	−3.1%

Year	Pop.	±%
1980	1,528	−2.2%
1991	1,440	−5.8%
2001	1,564	+8.6%
2011	2,027	+29.6%
2021	2,477	+22.2%

Source: Censuses

== Transport ==
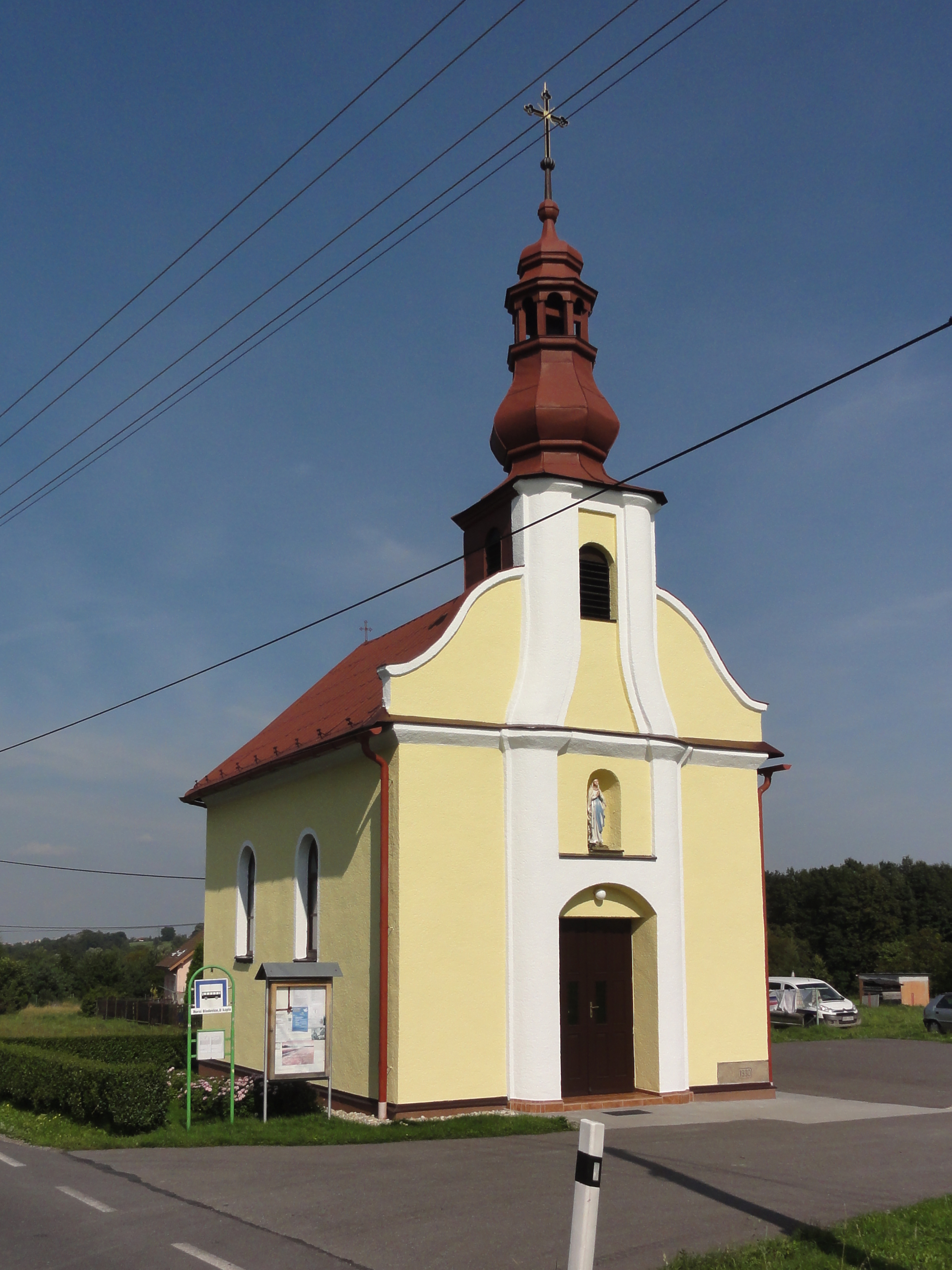
Chapel of Saint John of Nepomuk

There are no railways or major roads passing through the municipality.

== Sights ==
The only protected cultural monument in the municipality is a Baroque statue of Saint John of Nepomuk from the 18th century. A cultural landmark is also the Chapel of St. John of Nepomuk.
