= Bludovice (Havířov) =

- municipal part of the Czech Republic
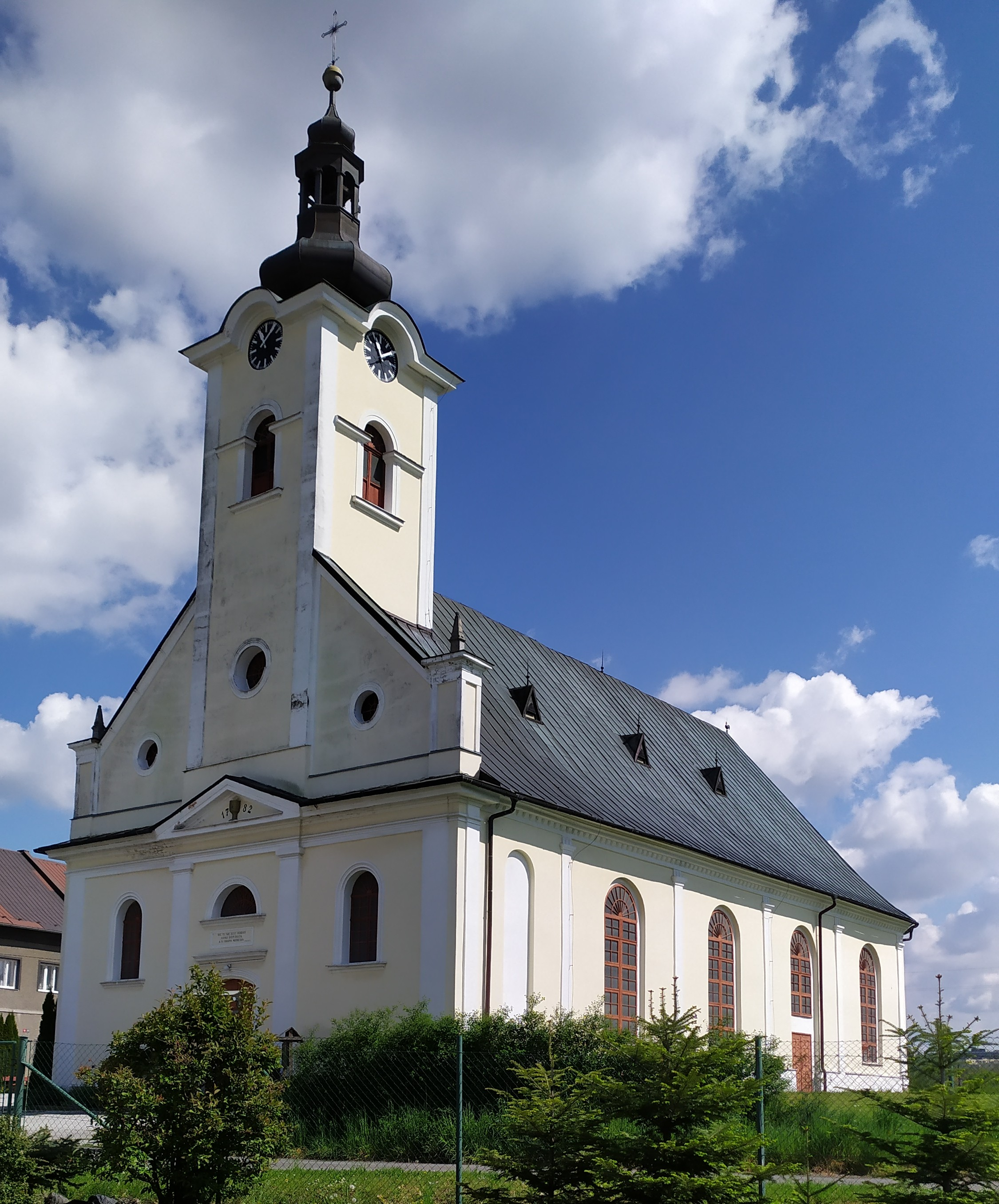

- Coordinates: 49°45′59″N 18°26′19″E
- Country: Czech Republic

Area
  - Total: 4.221 km^{2} (1.630 sq mi)

Population (26 March 2021)
  - Total: 2,616
  - Density: 620/km^{2} (1,600/sq mi)

Bludovice (Polish: Błędowice) (until 1960 Dolní Bludovice; Polish: Błędowice Dolne, German: Nieder Bludowitz) is a village and part of Havířov in Karviná District, Moravian-Silesian Region, Czech Republic. It was a separate municipality but after the expansion of Havířov founded in 1955 it became an administrative part of this city in 1960. The Lučina River flows through the village. It has a population of 2,744 (2020). The village lies in the historical region of Cieszyn Silesia.

== History ==
The village was first mentioned in a written document as a seat of a Catholic parish in an incomplete register of Peter's Pence payment from 1335 as Bluda and as such the parish was one of the oldest in the region. It was again mentioned in the register of Peter's Pence payment from 1447 among 50 parishes of Teschen deanery as Bluda.

Politically the village belonged initially to the Duchy of Teschen, formed in 1290 in the process of feudal fragmentation of Poland and was ruled by a local branch of Piast dynasty. In 1327 the duchy became a fee of the Kingdom of Bohemia, which after 1526 became part of the Habsburg monarchy.

After the 1540s Protestant Reformation prevailed in the Duchy of Teschen and a local Catholic church was taken over by Lutherans. It was taken from them (as one from around fifty buildings in the region) by a special commission and given back to the Roman Catholic Church in 1654. In spite of being bereft of place of worship many of the local inhabitants remained to be Lutherans. After issuing the Patent of Toleration in 1781 they subsequently organized a local Lutheran parish as one of over ten in the region.

After Revolutions of 1848 in the Austrian Empire a modern municipal division was introduced in the re-established Austrian Silesia. The village as a municipality was subscribed to the political and legal district of Cieszyn. According to the censuses conducted in 1880, 1890, 1900 and 1910 the population of the municipality grew from 1986 in 1880 to 2548 in 1910 with a majority being native Polish-speakers (at least 92.3% in 1880, at most 97.8% in 1890) accompanied by a Czech-speaking minority (at most 102 or 5.2% in 1880) and German-speaking (at most 49 or 2.5% in 1880). In terms of religion in 1910 majority were Protestants (85.2%), followed by Roman Catholics (12.9%), Jews (26 or 1.2%) and 20 people adhering to another faiths.

After World War I, fall of Austria-Hungary, Polish–Czechoslovak War and the division of Cieszyn Silesia in 1920, it became a part of Czechoslovakia. Following the Munich Agreement, in October 1938 together with the Zaolzie region it was annexed by Poland, administratively adjoined to Cieszyn County of Silesian Voivodeship. It was then annexed by Nazi Germany at the beginning of World War II. After the war it was restored to Czechoslovakia.

There are now three cemeteries in the village, Lutheran church, Roman Catholic church and two elementary schools (Polish and Czech). The Polish elementary school is the oldest school on the territory of Havířov.

== Demography ==
Significant part of the population of Bludovice belongs to the Polish minority in the Czech Republic.

== Notable people ==
- Wiesław Adam Berger, Polish writer, lived there
- Józef Kiedroń, Polish engineer and politician

== Gallery ==
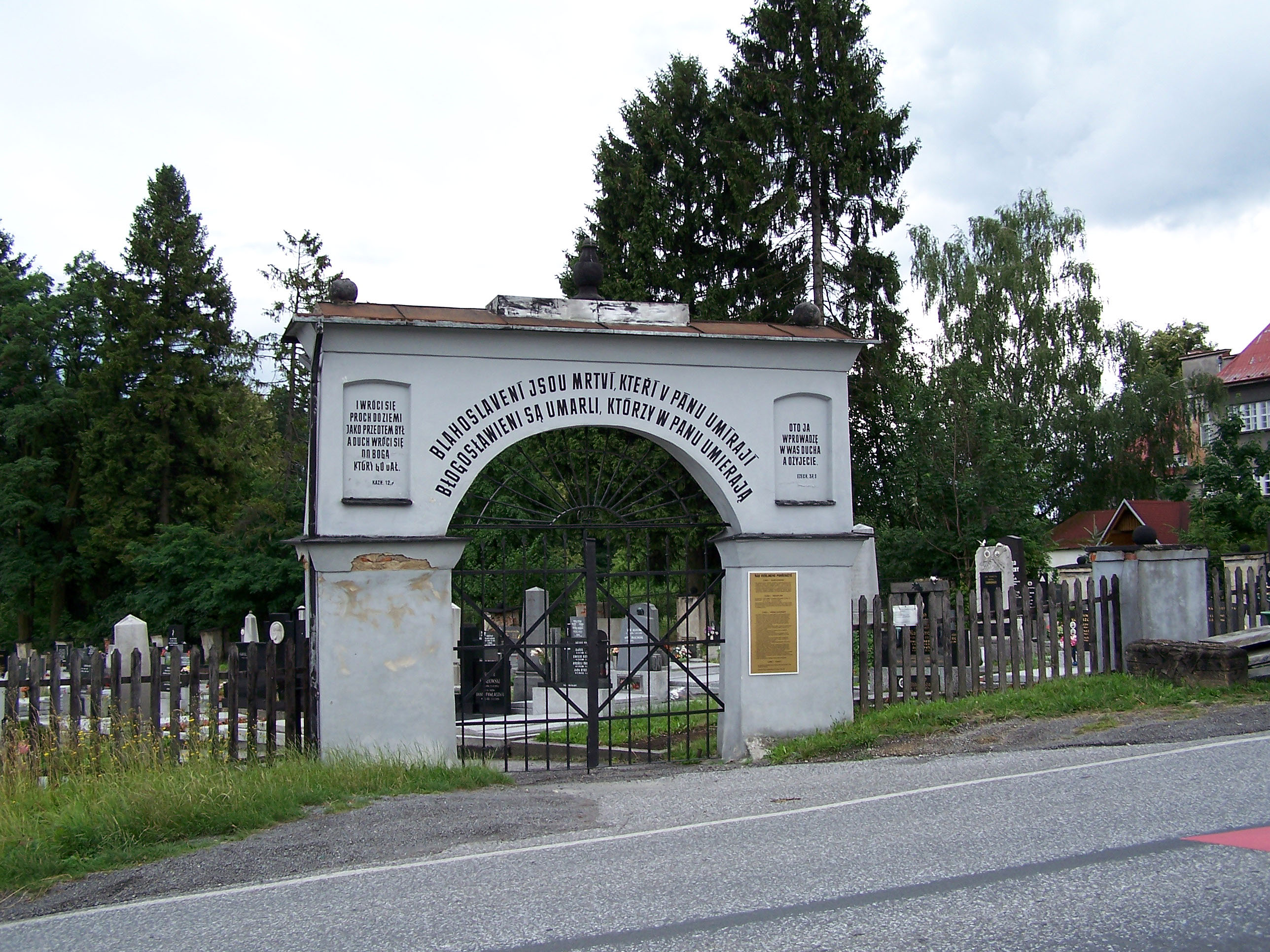
Entrance gate to the Old Protestant cemetery

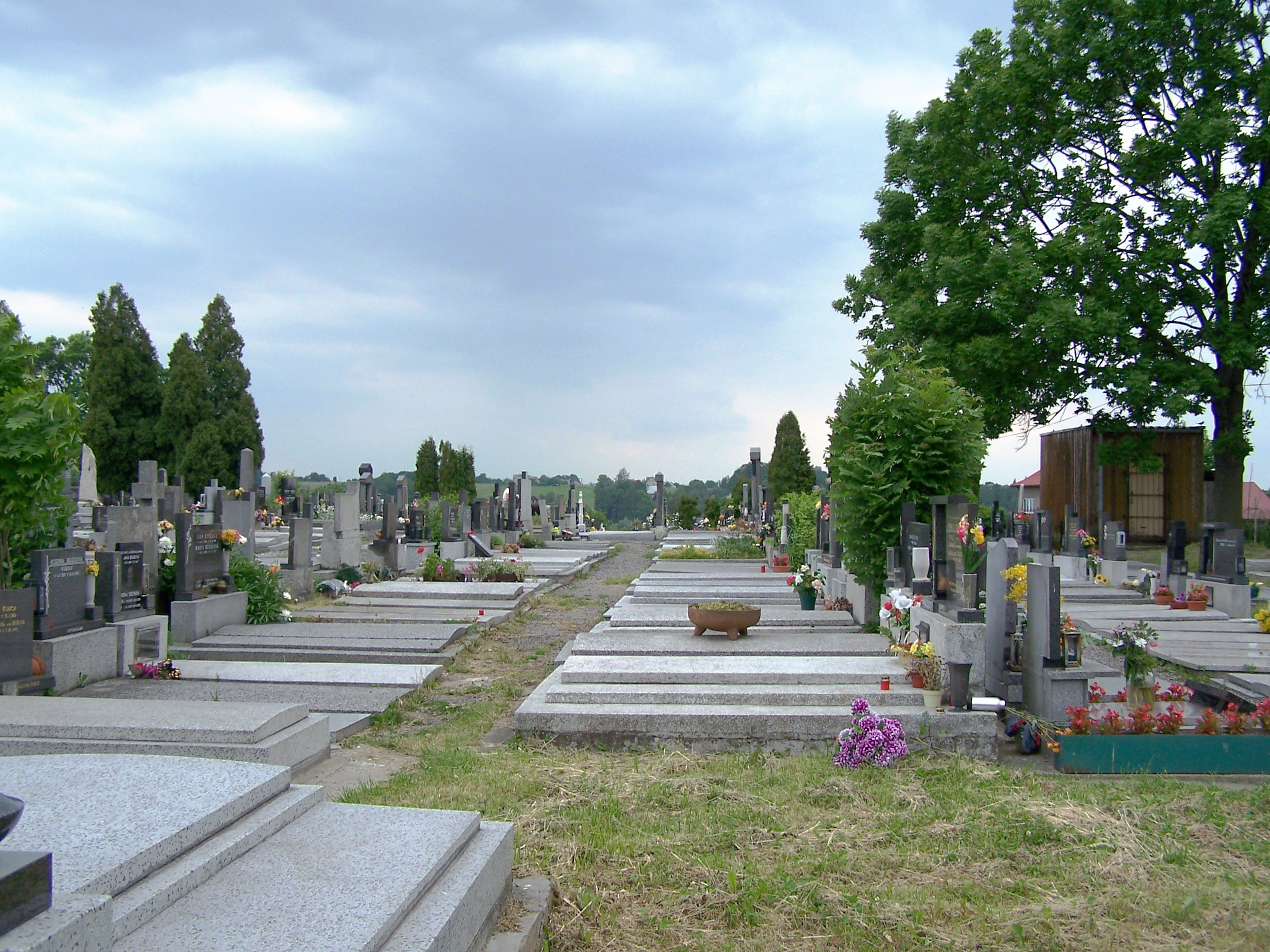
New Protestant cemetery

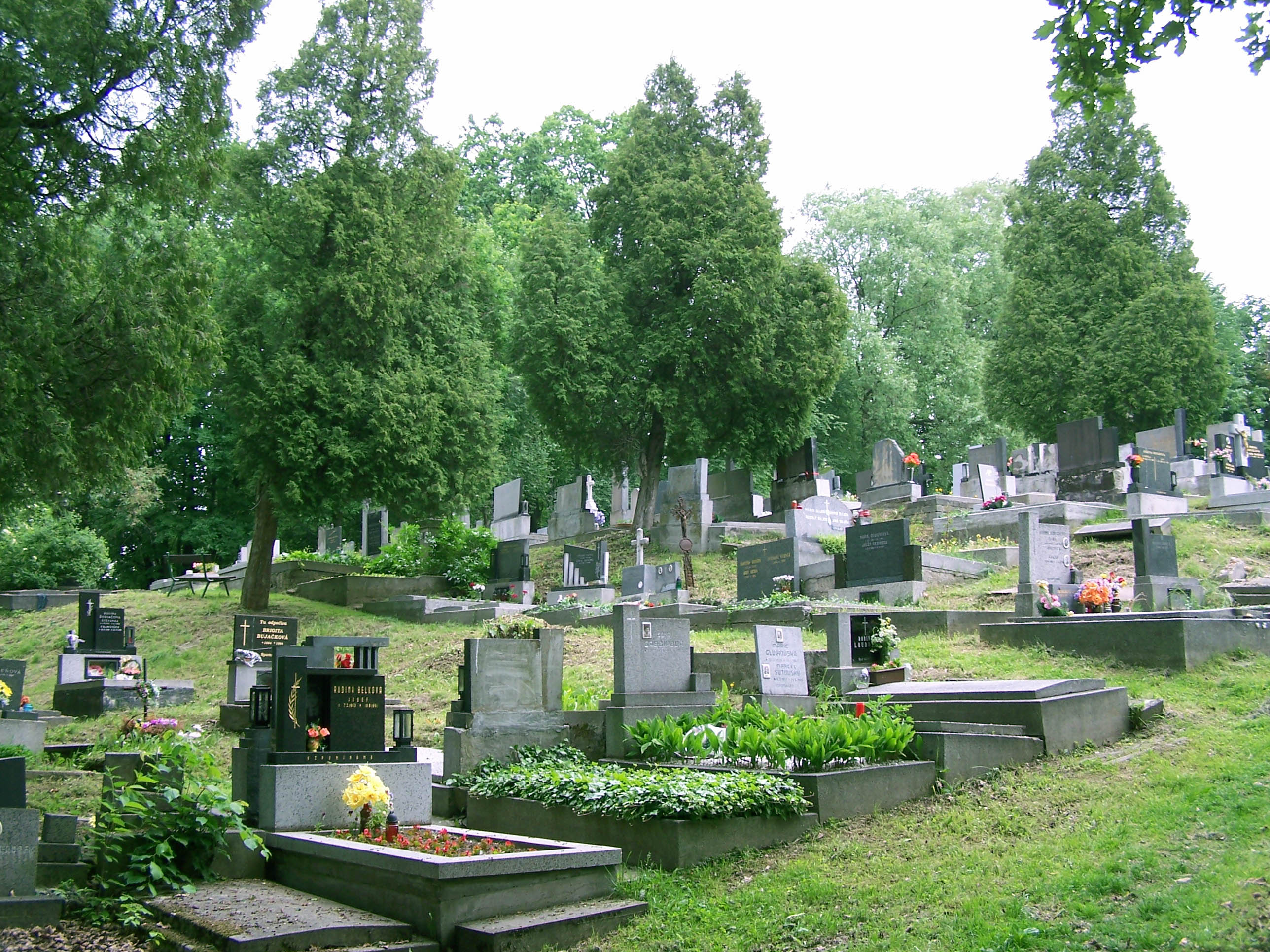
Catholic cemetery

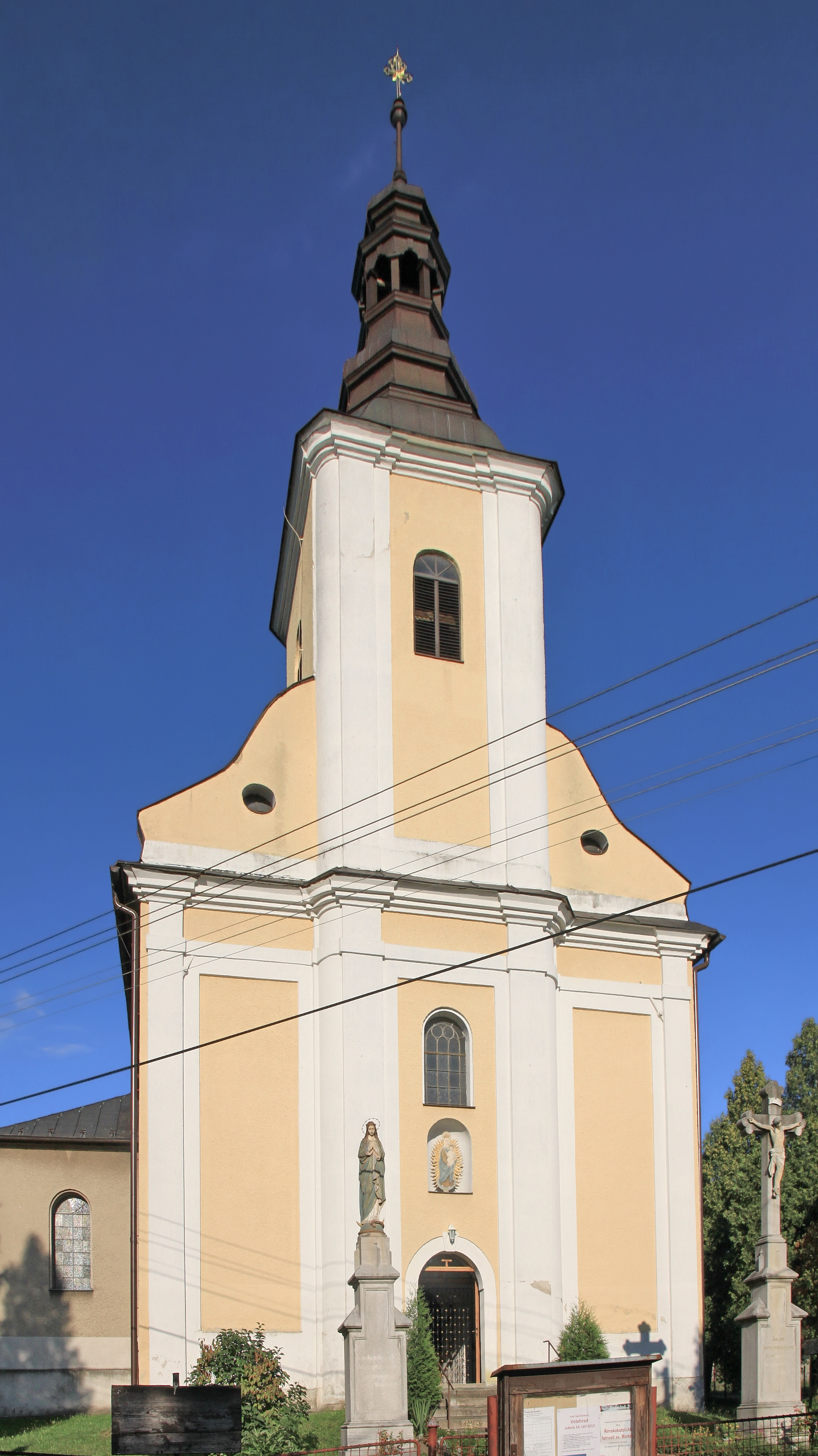
Church of Saint Margaret

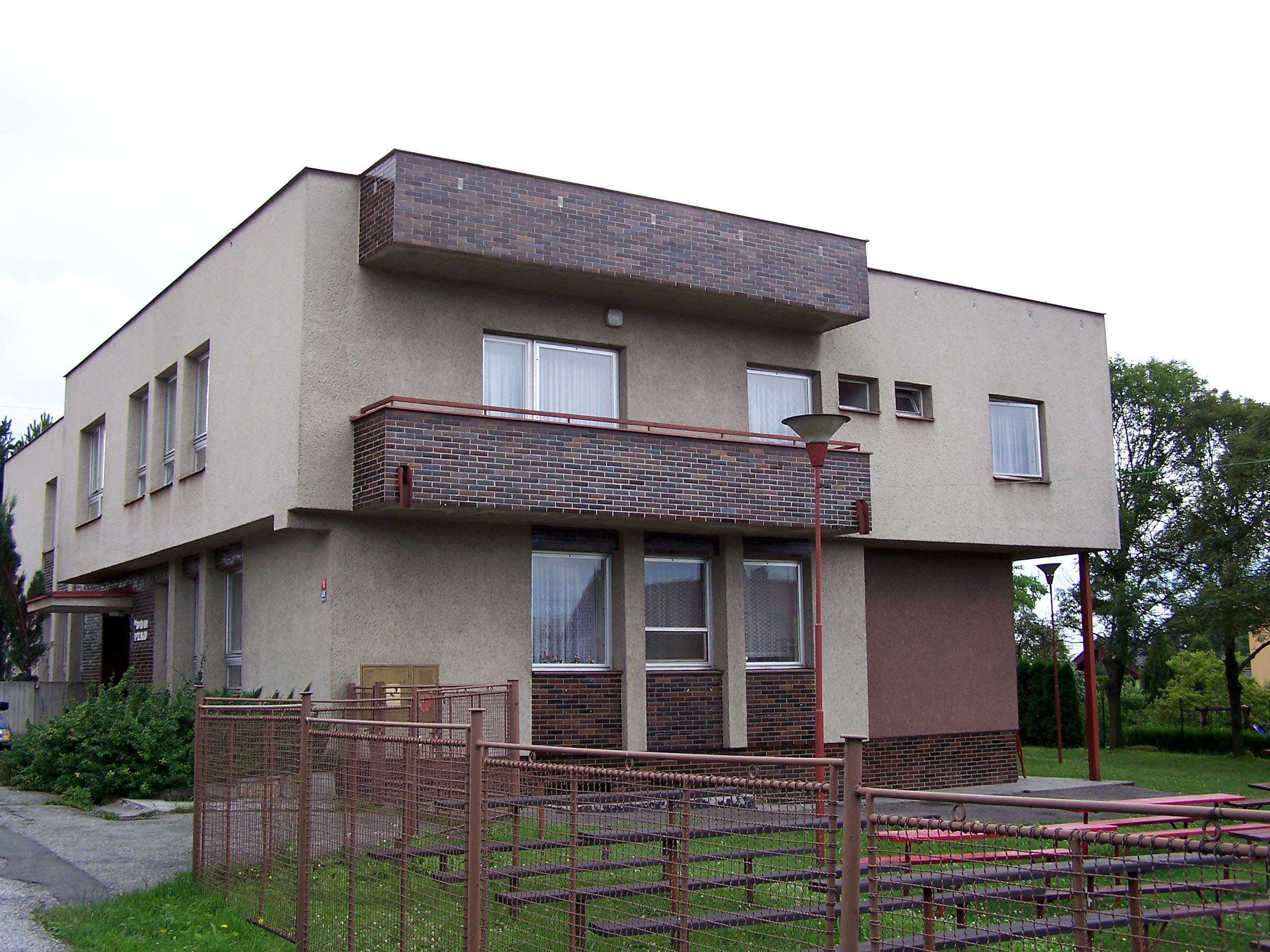
PZKO House

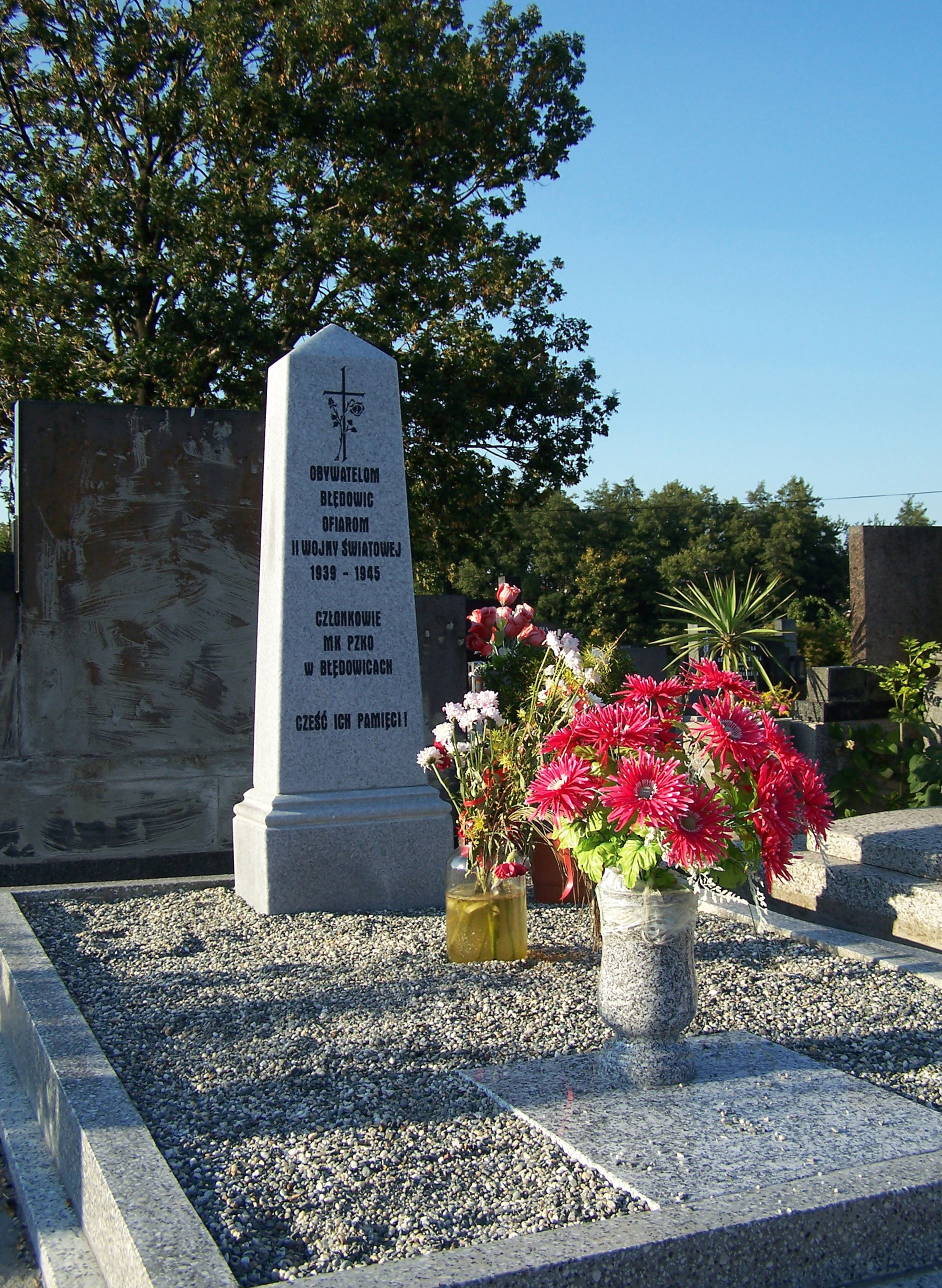
Monument dedicated to victims of World War II

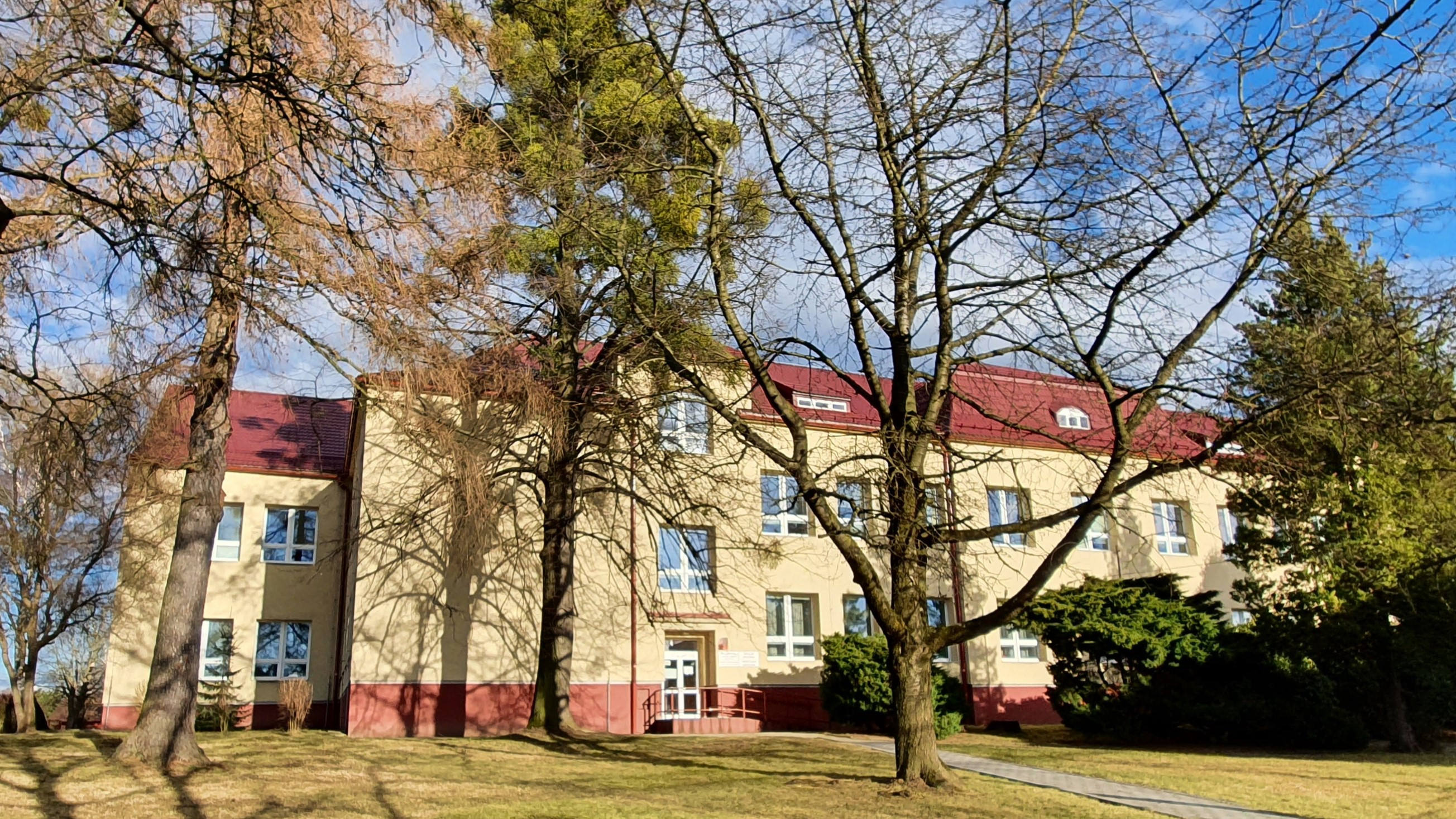
Polish elementary school

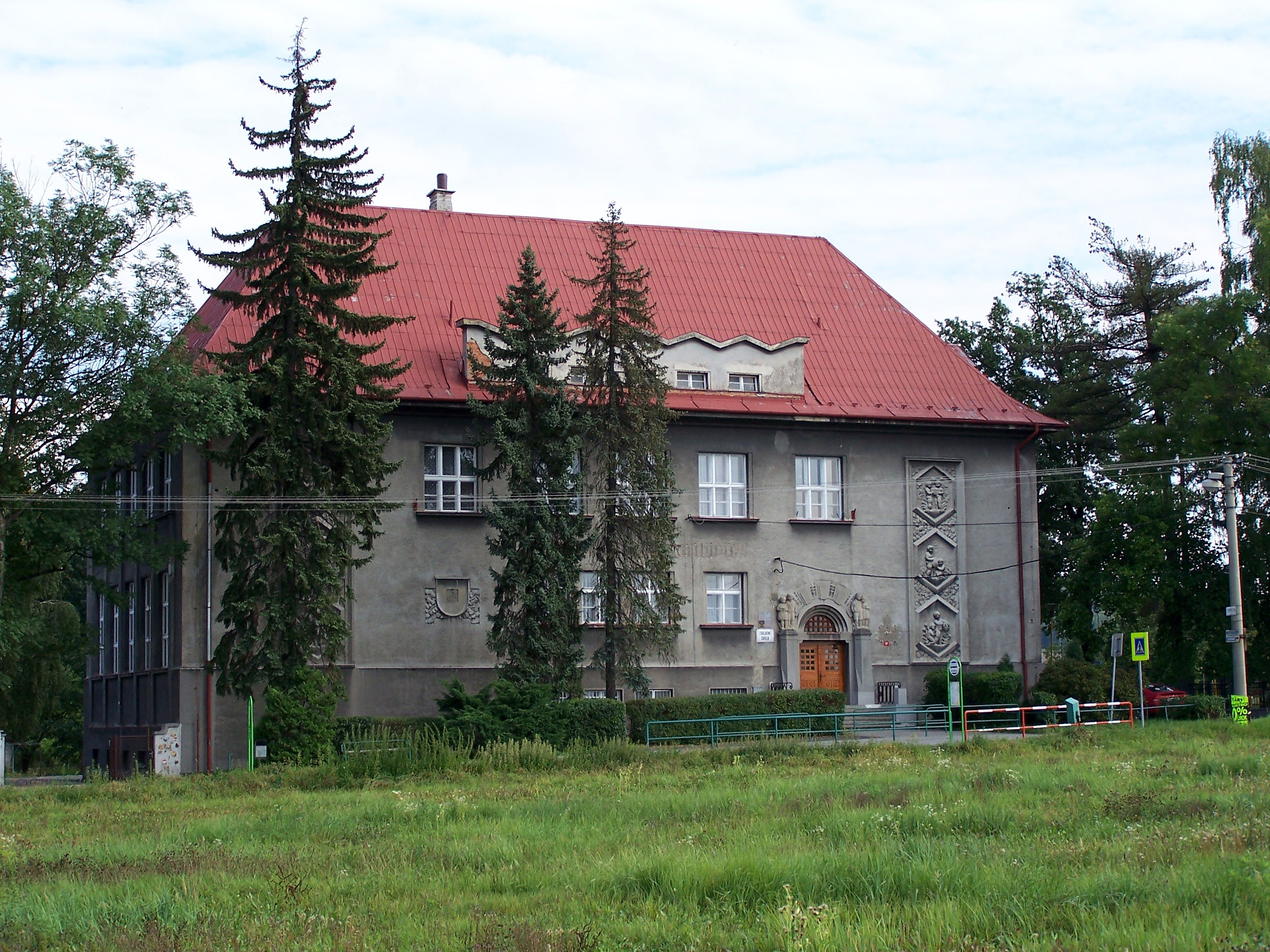
Czech elementary school

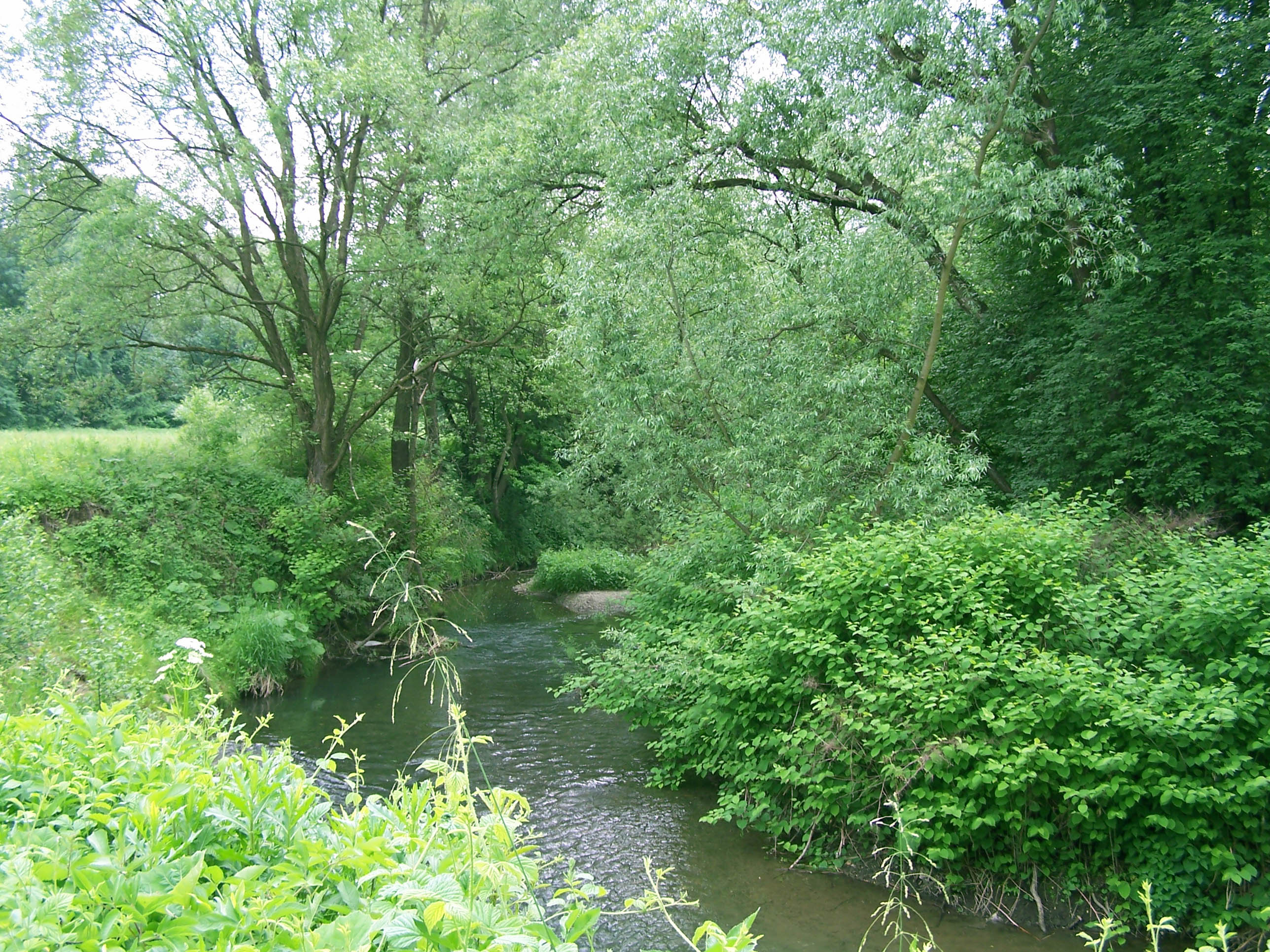
Lučina River
