= Horní Domaslavice =

- Municipality
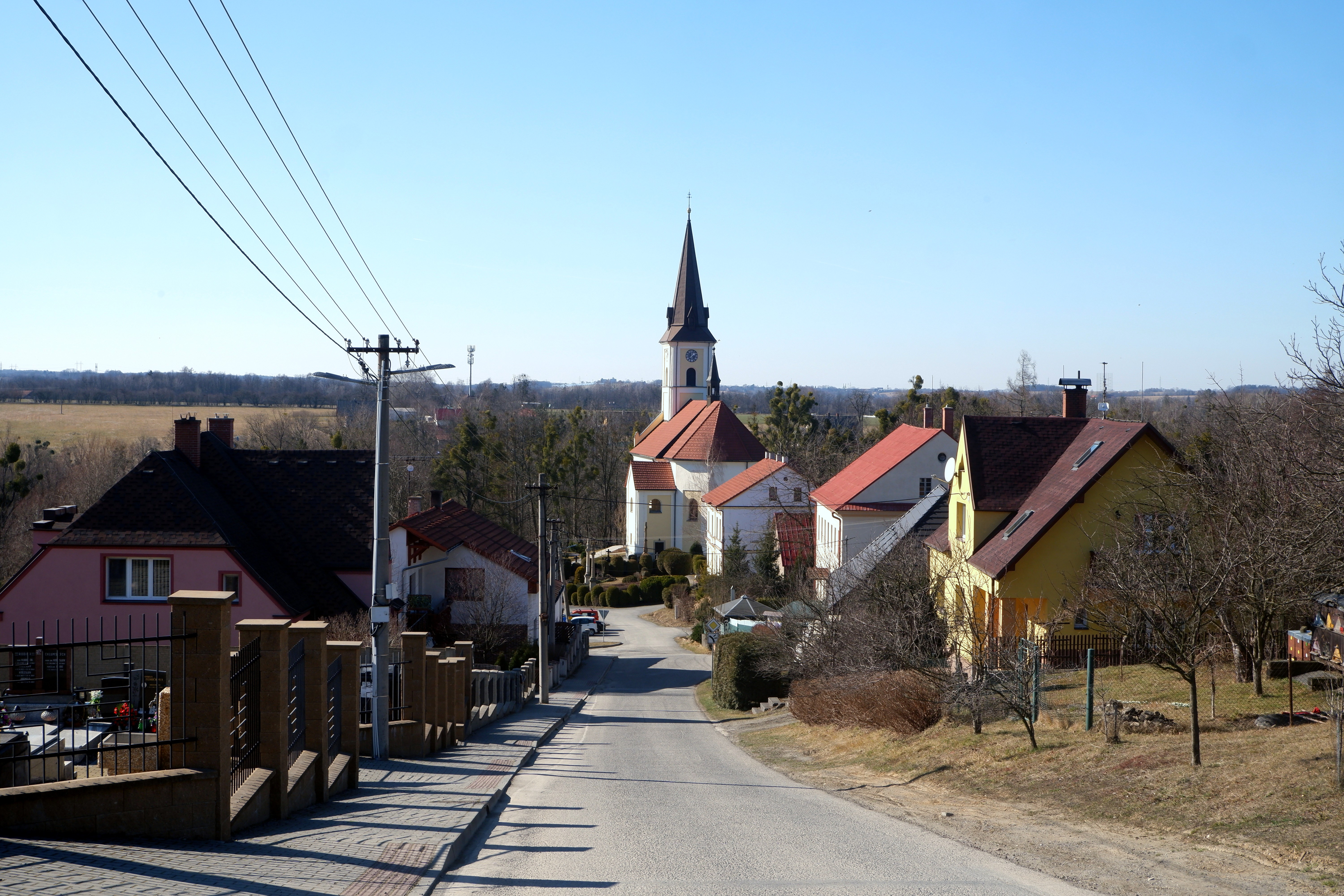
- View towards the church

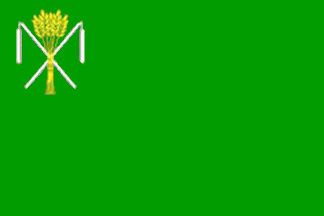
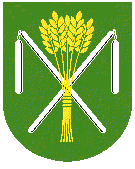
- Flag Coat of arms

- Location in the Czech Republic
- Coordinates: 49°41′44″N 18°27′33″E
- Country: Czech Republic
- Region: Moravian-Silesian
- District: Frýdek-Místek
- First mentioned: 1597

Area
  - Total: 5.07 km^{2} (1.96 sq mi)
- Elevation: 320 m (1,050 ft)

Population (2026-01-01)
  - Total: 1,109
  - Density: 219/km^{2} (567/sq mi)
- Time zone: UTC+1 (CET)
  - Summer (DST): UTC+2 (CEST)
- Postal code: 739 51
- Website: www.hornidomaslavice.cz

Horní Domaslavice (Polish: Domasłowice Górne) is a municipality and village in Frýdek-Místek District in the Moravian-Silesian Region of the Czech Republic. It has about 1,100 inhabitants.

== Geography ==
Horní Domaslavice is located about 7 kilometres (4 mi) east of Frýdek-Místek, in the historical region of Cieszyn Silesia. It lies in the Moravian-Silesian Foothills. The highest point is at 360 m (1,181 ft) above sea level. The Lučina River flows through the municipality.

== History ==
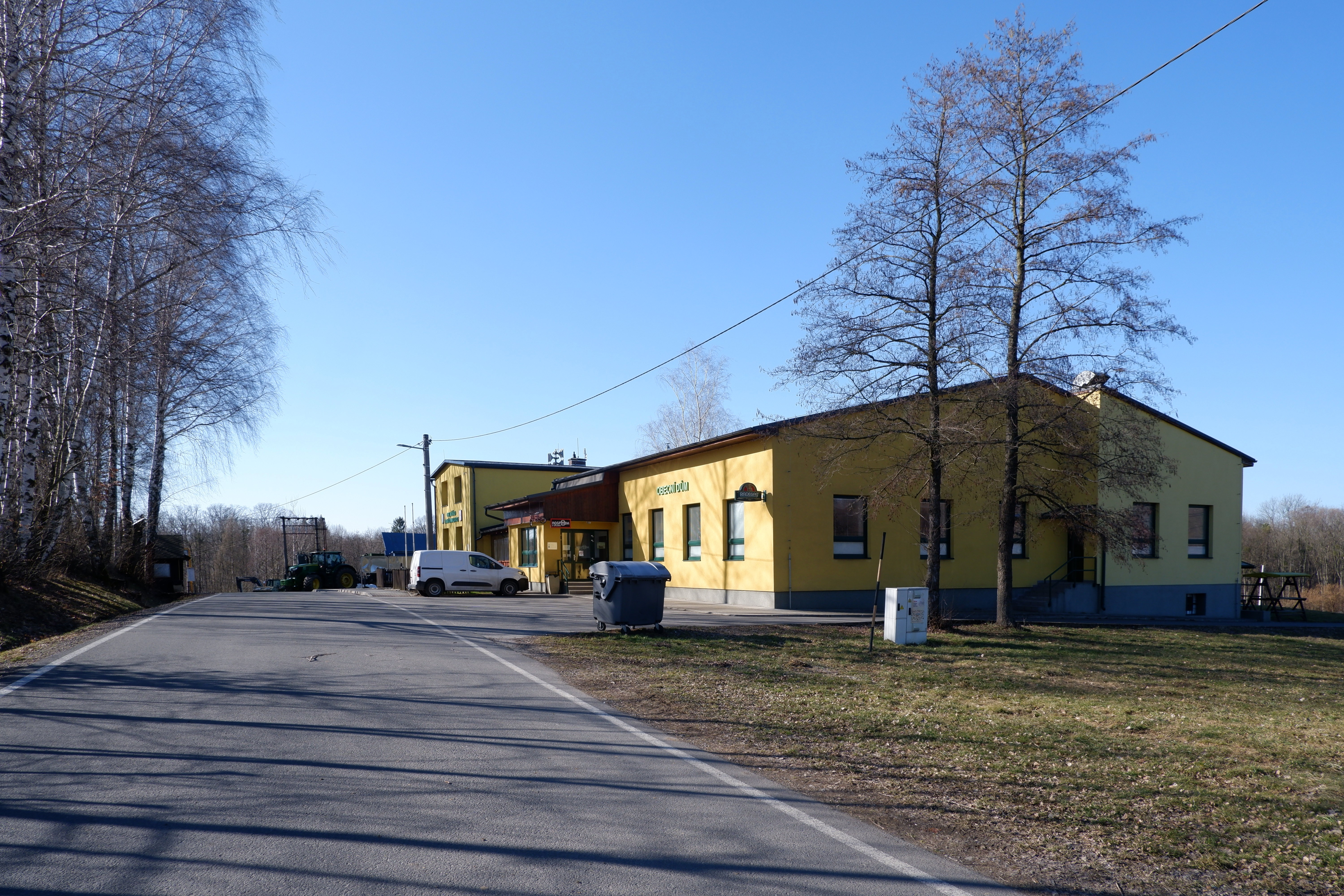
Municipal office and cultural centre

The village was first mentioned in a Latin document of Diocese of Wrocław called Liber fundationis episcopatus Vratislaviensis from around 1305 as Domaslawitz utroque. It meant that there were already two villages of that name (utroque meaning 'both' in Latin), the other being Dolní Domaslavice.

Politically the village belonged initially to the Duchy of Teschen. In 1327, the duchy became a fee of the Kingdom of Bohemia, which after 1526 became part of the Habsburg monarchy.

The village became a seat of a Catholic parish, mentioned in the register of Peter's Pence payment from 1447 among 50 parishes of Teschen deanery as Domaslowicz.

After the 1540s Protestant Reformation prevailed in the Duchy of Teschen and a local Catholic church was taken over by Lutherans. It was taken from them (as one from around fifty buildings) in the region by a special commission and given back to the Roman Catholic Church on 24 March 1654.

After Revolutions of 1848 in the Austrian Empire a modern municipal division was introduced in the re-established Austrian Silesia. The village as a municipality was subscribed to the political and legal district of Cieszyn. According to the censuses conducted in 1880–1910, the population of the municipality dropped from 798 in 1880 to 789 in 1910 with a majority being native Czech-speakers (between 94.2% and 97.8%) accompanied by a small Polish-speaking minority (at most 29 or 3.7% in 1900) and German-speaking (at most 40 or 5% in 1880). In terms of religion, majority in 1910 were Roman Catholics (98.6%), followed by Protestants (10 or 1.3%) and one Jew.

After World War I, Polish–Czechoslovak War and the division of Cieszyn Silesia in 1920, the municipality became a part of Czechoslovakia. Following the Munich Agreement, in October 1938 together with the Trans-Olza region it was annexed by Poland, administratively adjoined to Cieszyn County of Silesian Voivodeship. It was then annexed by Nazi Germany at the beginning of World War II. After the war, it was restored to Czechoslovakia.

== Demographics ==
Historical population

Year	Pop.	±%
1869	781	—
1880	798	+2.2%
1890	810	+1.5%
1900	778	−4.0%
1910	789	+1.4%

Year	Pop.	±%
1921	716	−9.3%
1930	860	+20.1%
1950	790	−8.1%
1961	813	+2.9%
1970	740	−9.0%

Year	Pop.	±%
1980	660	−10.8%
1991	521	−21.1%
2001	556	+6.7%
2011	667	+20.0%
2021	978	+46.6%

Source: Censuses

== Transport ==
There are no railways or major roads passing through the municipality.

== Sights ==
The main landmark of Horní Domaslavice is the Church of Saint James the Great. It was built in the Baroque style in 1740–1745.
