= Lučina (river) =

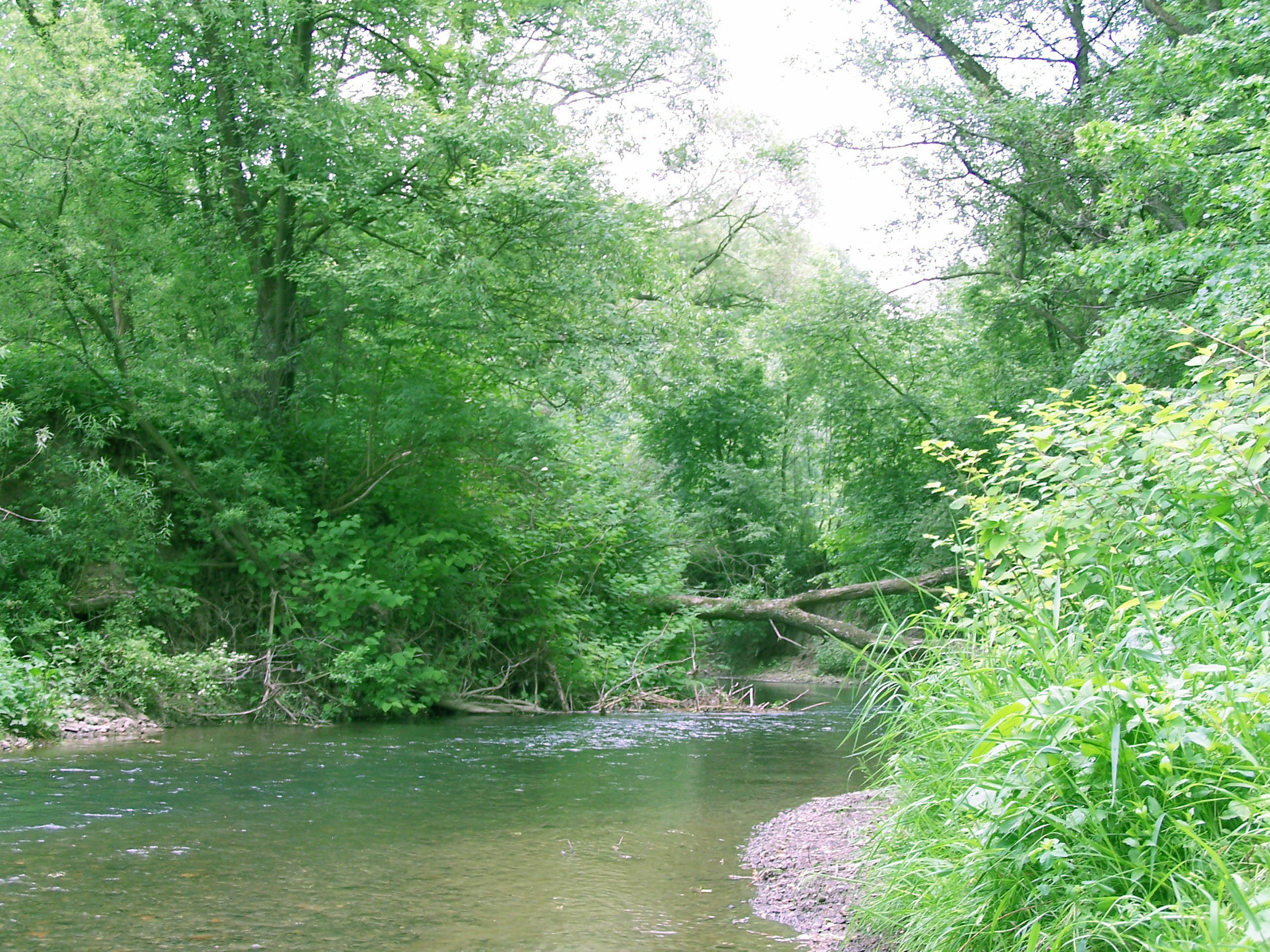
- The Lučina in Havířov

Location
- Country: Czech Republic
- Region: Moravian-Silesian

Physical characteristics
- Source
  - location: Komorní Lhotka, Moravian-Silesian Beskids
  - coordinates: 49°38′17″N 18°29′55″E
  - elevation: 689 m (2,260 ft)
- Mouth
  - location: Ostravice
  - coordinates: 49°49′55″N 18°17′48″E
  - elevation: 205 m (673 ft)
- Length: 38.6 km (24.0 mi)
- Basin size: 197.1 km^{2} (76.1 sq mi)
- Discharge
  - average: 2.75 m^{3}/s (97 cu ft/s) near estuary

Basin features
- Progression: Ostravice→ Oder→ Baltic Sea

The Lučina (Polish: Łucyna) is a river in the Czech Republic, a right tributary of the Ostravice. It flows through the Moravian-Silesian Region. It is 38.6 km (24.0 mi) long.

== Etymology ==
Until 1956, the river was named Lucina. After the municipality of Lučina was founded in 1956, the river was renamed Lučina.

== Characteristic ==
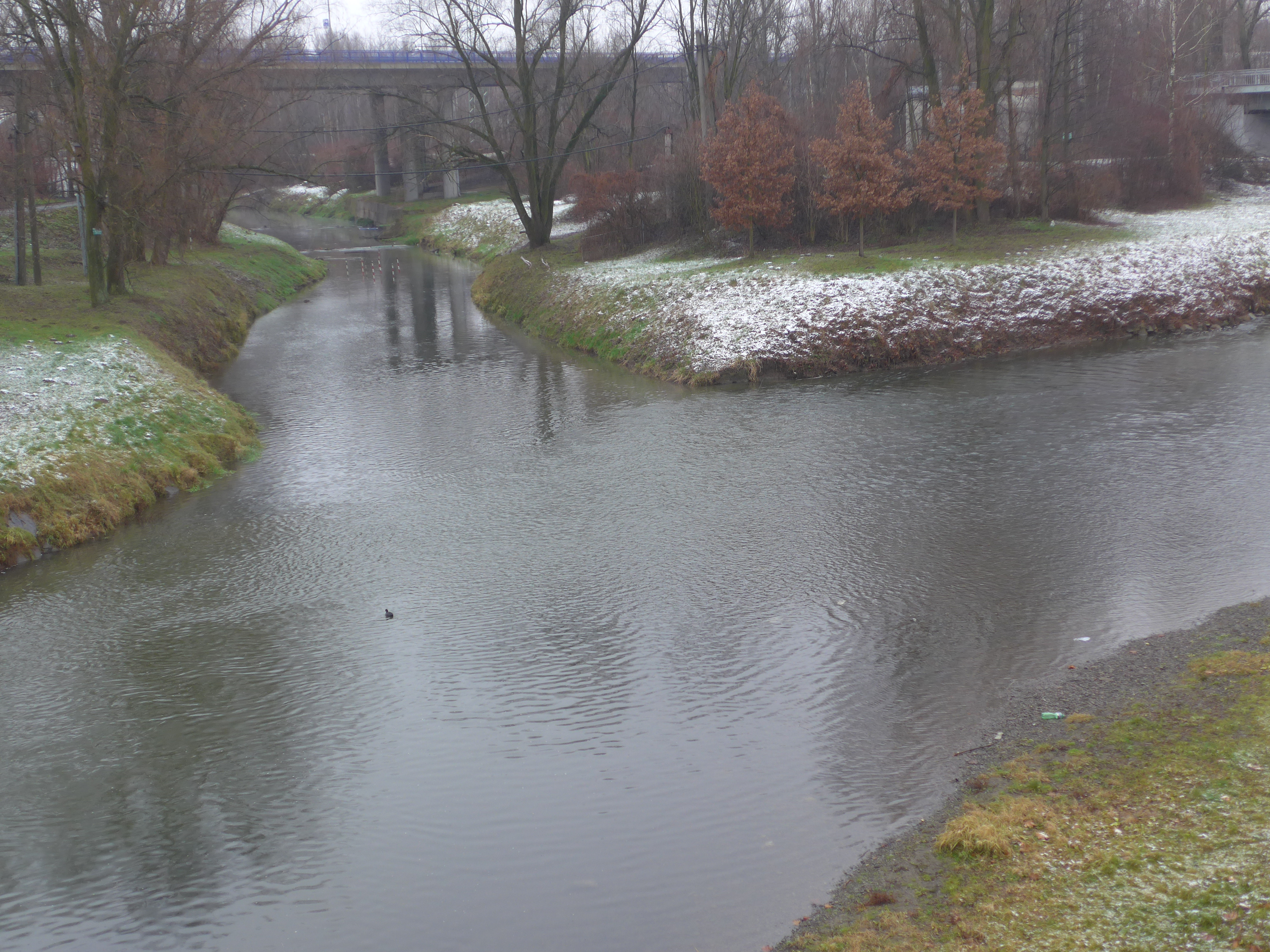
Confluence of the Lučina (left) and Ostravice

The Lučina originates in the territory of Komorní Lhotka in the Moravian-Silesian Beskids at an elevation of 689 m (2,260 ft) and flows to Ostrava, where it merges with the Ostravice River at an elevation of 205 m (673 ft). It is 38.6 km (24.0 mi) long. Its drainage basin has an area of 197.1 km^{2} (76.1 sq mi). The average discharge at its mouth is 2.75 m^{3}/s (97 cu ft/s).

The longest tributaries of the Lučina are:

Tributary	Length (km)	Side
Venclůvka	12.0	left
Sušanka	10.2	right
Řetník	8.2	left
Datyňka	8.2	left

In addition to its tributaries, the river receives water from the Morávka River through the Morávka–Žermanice Canal (also called Vyšní Lhoty–Žermanice Canal). The canal was built in 1953–1958 and has a length of 7.5 km (4.7 mi). Its purpose is to strengthen the flood protection of settlements on the lower course of the Morávka.

== Course ==
The river flows through the municipal territories of Komorní Lhotka, Vyšní Lhoty, Dobratice, Nošovice, Vojkovice, Horní Domaslavice, Lučina, Žermanice, Horní Bludovice, Havířov, Šenov and Ostrava.

== Bodies of water ==
The Žermanice Reservoir is built on the river.

== Nature ==
The Lučina originates in the Beskydy Protected Landscape Area. The meanders of the river in the area of Havířov is protected as the Meandry Lučiny Nature Monument with an area of 40.6 km (25.2 mi). The main object of protection is the unregulated river flow of the Lučina, which enables the further development of river meanders. There is a rich species diversity, including 15 species of dragonflies, 13 species of fish and endangered species of amphibians.

Protected animals that live in the river include the common minnow and European crayfish. The river is also a nesting place for the common kingfisher.

== In literature ==
The book Most nad Łucyną ("Bridge over the Lučina") by poet Wiesław Adam Berger is centered on the river.

== See also ==
- List of rivers of the Czech Republic
