= 2009 SK Brann season =

Brann
2009 season
- Manager: Steinar Nilsen
- Stadium: Brann Stadion
- Tippeligaen: 5th
- Norwegian Cup: Quarter-finals
- Top goalscorer: League: Erik Huseklepp (15); All: Erik Huseklepp (15)

The 2009 season was SK Brann's 101st season and their 23rd consecutive season in the Tippeligaen. Steinar Nilsen took over as head coach after the six-year tenure of Mons Ivar Mjelde. The club didn't see the big signings or sales in the January transferwindow. Local-lad Erlend Hanstveit left the club after 10 years, while thought-to-be star striker Njogu Demba-Nyrén was sold only one year after signing with the club following a season where his performance was below expectations.

The season started horrific for the "pride of Bergen". In the first premiership match of the season, Brann lost 1–3 against newly promoted Sandefjord, followed by two ties, a loss and another tie. Brann didn't win a game until the sixth round where they beat Bodø/Glimt 2–0 away.

The club's form improved as the season went by, but they were never a serious contender to the league title. After being knocked out in the Quarterfinals of the Norwegian Football Cup by Odd Grenland), the season seemed to end up as a total disappointment for the fans. One of the few highlights of the season was the performances of Erik Huseklepp who had his definite breakthrough as a player. In his first season as a striker, Huseklepp scored 15 goals in the league, only two goals shy of the top scorer Rade Prica. The technical striker had previously played as a right winger, scoring 4 goals in 4 seasons for Brann. He also became a regular in the national team squad, scoring his first goal for Norway in the World Cup qualifier against Scotland on August 2, 2009.

Before the last games of season, Brann found themselves in a situation where they had a legitimate chance to snatch the bronze medals, but in the end they had to settle for a fifth place, which didn't qualify for a spot in the Europa League.

== Information ==
Manager: Steinar Nilsen
League: Tippeligaen
Shirt supplier: Kappa
Shirt sponsor: Sparebanken Vest
Average league attendance: 15,932 (4th best in club history at the time)
League result : 5th
Norwegian Cup: Quarterfinals (1–5 against Odd Grenland)
Top goal scorer: Erik Huseklepp (15 in league, 0 in cup, 15 in total)
Player of the year: -

== Season events ==
- January 6: Two players left Brann. Nicolai Misje did not get his contract renewed, while Michael Thwaite was sold to the newly started Australian club Gold Coast United .
- January 10: Erlend Hanstveit chose to not take Brann up on their last contract offer. He reasoned his decision with his wish to play abroad. The wingback had played for the club since 1998.
- January 26: Njogu Demba-Nyrén returned to Denmark after signing a 3.5 year contract with OB. In addition to a money fee worth between NOK 6 and 7 million, Brann also got the Danish striker David Nielsen.
- February 26: Brann signed the young striker Cato Hansen from Bryne FK.
- February 27: Rodolph Austins transfer to Brann was made permanent. The Jamaican midfielder signed a four-year deal with Brann.
- March 11: Yaw Amankwah was loaned out to Alta IF.
- March 12: Kristian Flittie Onstad was brought to Brann on a loan deal from Esbjerg fB.
- March 16: Brann opened their Premiership-season with a poor performance against the newly promoted Sandefjord Fotball. Brann lost 1–3 in Sandefjord in a match that featured the official debuts of Bjørnar Holmvik, Cato Hansen, David Nielsen and Kristian Flittie Onstad.
- March 22: Brann took their first point of the season after playing 1–1 against the reigning champions Stabæk Fotball. The match was characterized by terrible playing conditions, as the new gras at Brann Stadion hadn't had time to grow properly into the soil.
- April 27: Brann took their first three-pointer of the season after a 2–0 win against Bodø/Glimt away in the sixth round of the 2009 Tippeligaen. David Nielsen scored both of Brann's goals, his first in the red jersey.
- May 13: Brann advanced to the second round of the Norwegian Cup after a 6–0 win over IL Høyang.
- May 24: Brann advanced to the third round of the Norwegian Cup after a 2–0 win over Lyngbø SK.
- June 17: Brann advanced to the fourth round of the Norwegian Cup after a 4–2 win over Nest-Sotra.
- July 9: Brann advanced to the quarterfinals of the Norwegian Cup after a 1–0 win over FC Lyn Oslo.
- August 5: Brann signed the Uruguayan striker Diego Guastavino from FC Lyn Oslo.
- August 7: Cato Hansen was loaned out to fellow Bergen-based club Løv-Ham for the remainder of the season.
- August 8: Brann was knocked-out of the Norwegian Cup after a 5–1 loss against Odd Grenland in the quarterfinals. The match at Skagerak Arena was not without controversy. After 29 minutes, Håkon Opdal and Hassan El Fakiri got injured in a duel after a cornerkick. Opdal injured his knee, but was able to continue, while El Fakiri had to leave the pitch temporary to treat a cut in the head. Three minutes later, Opdal got an easy pass that he intended to play up the pitch. Just when he was about to kick the ball, Opdal's knee gave up on him, causing him to fall to the ground and losing control over the ball. Odd-striker Péter Kovács took advantage of the situation and put the ball in the net with ease. His actions was seen as an act of unsportsmanship and a breach of Fair Play by the Brann-players. Brann also had Eirik Bakke sent off, while Ólafur Örn Bjarnason missed a penalty kick.
- August 12: Bjørn Dahl signed a contract with Hønefoss BK on a free transfer.
- August 26: Ármann Björnsson signed with League One-club Hartlepool United on a free transfer.
- September 1: Azar Karadas signed with Turkish-club Kasımpaşa S.K. The deal was worth around NOK 2.000.000.
- Oktober 19: On a press conference on Brann Stadion, Brann's director of football Bjørn Dahl announced a NOK 20m deficit, due to lack of revenue as a direct consequence of the 2008 financial crisis.
- November 1: Brann finished their season with a 1–1 draw at home against league champions Rosenborg BK.
- November 21: Johan Thorbjørnsen signed for Løv-Ham.

== Squad ==
Note: Flags indicate national team as defined under FIFA eligibility rules; some limited exceptions apply. Players may hold more than one non-FIFA nationality.

No.	Pos.	Nation	Player
1	GK	NOR	Johan Thorbjørnsen
2	DF	ISL	Birkir Sævarsson
3	DF	NOR	Bjørn Dahl
4	DF	NOR	Cato Guntveit
5	MF	JAM	Rudolph Austin
6	FW	NOR	Azar Karadas
7	MF	NOR	Hassan El Fakiri
8	MF	ISL	Gylfi Einarsson
9	MF	NOR	Jan Gunnar Solli
10	FW	DEN	David Nielsen
11	MF	NOR	Petter Vaagan Moen
12	GK	NOR	Håkon Opdal

No.	Pos.	Nation	Player
13	FW	NOR	Erik Huseklepp
14	MF	GAM	Tijan Jaiteh
15	FW	URU	Diego Gustavino
16	MF	NOR	Bjarte Haugsdal
17	MF	NOR	Eirik Bakke
18	DF	ISL	Ólafur Örn Bjarnason
20	DF	NOR	Kristian Flittie Onstad (on loan from Esbjerg fB)
21	DF	ISL	Kristján Örn Sigurðsson
24	GK	NOR	Kenneth Udjus
26	DF	NOR	Bjørnar Holmvik
27	FW	NOR	Matias Møvik
28	DF	ISL	Ármann Björnsson

=== Out on loan ===
Note: Flags indicate national team as defined under FIFA eligibility rules; some limited exceptions apply. Players may hold more than one non-FIFA nationality.

No.	Pos.	Nation	Player
—	DF	NOR	Knut Walde (on loan to Løv-Ham)
—	DF	NOR	Yaw Ihle Amankwah (on loan to Alta IF)

No.	Pos.	Nation	Player
—	FW	NOR	Cato Hansen (on loan to Løv-Ham from August 2009)

== Team kit ==
The team kits for the 2009 season were produced by Kappa and the main shirt sponsor was Sparebanken Vest. Other sponsors featured on the kit were BKK (shoulders), JM Byggholt (chest), BA (left arm), Chess (upper back), Frydenbø (shorts) and Tide (socks).

Home	Away	Third	Goalkeeper 1	Goalkeeper 2

== Transfers ==
=== Players in ===
Only first team squad transfers

Winter 2008/09

- Bjørnar Holmvik from Stabæk IF.
- David Nielsen from OB.
- Cato Hansen from Bryne FK.
- Rodolph Austin from Portmore United (transfer made permanent).
- Kristian Flittie Onstad from Esbjerg fB (loan).

Summer 2008/09

- Diego Guastavino from FC Lyn Oslo.

=== Players out ===
Only first team squad transfers

Winter 2008/09

- Robbie Winters was released in November 2008.
- Joakim Sjöhage to Trelleborgs FF.
- Trond Fredrik Ludvigsen to FK Bodø/Glimt.
- Michael Thwaite to Gold Coast United.
- Nicolay Misje was released.
- Erlend Hanstveit left after his contract expired.
  He later signed with K.A.A. Gent
- Njogu Demba-Nyrén to OB.
- Yaw Amankwah to Alta IF (loan).

Summer 2008/09

- Cato Hansen to Løv-Ham (loan).
- Bjørn Dahl to Hønefoss BK.
- Ármann Björnsson to Hartlepool United.
- Azar Karadas to Kasımpaşa S.K.

== Competitions ==
=== Tippeligaen ===
==== Results summary ====
Overall								Home						Away					
Pld	W	D	L	GF	GA	GD	Pts	W	D	L	GF	GA	GD	W	D	L	GF	GA	GD
30	12	8	10	51	49	+2	44	8	4	3	30	21	+9	4	4	7	21	28	−7

==== Results by round ====
Round	1	2	3	4	5	6	7	8	9	10	11	12	13	14	15	16	17	18	19	20	21	22	23	24	25	26	27	28	29	30
Ground	A	H	A	H	A	A	H	A	H	A	H	A	H	A	H	A	H	A	H	A	H	H	A	H	A	H	A	H	A	H
Result	L	D	D	L	D	W	W	L	D	W	W	L	W	D	W	L	W	L	W	D	W	L	W	D	L	W	W	L	L	D
Position	14	15	12	15	15	12	7	9	11	7	5	7	6	7	6	7	4	6	5	5	4	5	5	5	5	4	4	4	5	5

Updated to match(es) played on 1 November 2009. Source: see below
A = Away; H = Home; W = Win; D = Draw; L = Loss

==== Results ====
16 March 2009 1	Sandefjord	3–1	Brann	Sandefjord
19:00	Mjelde 20'; Mane 51', 61'	Report	Bjarnason 84'	Stadium: Komplett.no Arena; Attendance: 6,371; Referee: Svein Oddvar Moen

22 March 2009 2	Brann	1–1	Stabæk	Bergen
20:00	Solli 5'	Report	Diskerud 84'	Stadium: Brann Stadion; Attendance: 15,201; Referee: Tommy Skjerven

5 April 2009 3	Rosenborg	1–1	Brann	Trondheim
20:00	Dahl 52' (o.g.)	Report	Sigurðsson 83'	Stadium: Lerkendal Stadion; Attendance: 18,400; Referee: Brage Sandmoen

13 April 2009 4	Brann	2–4	Tromsø	Bergen
18:00	Bjarnason 42' (pen.), 69' (pen.)	Report	Moldskred 24', 36'; Rushfeldt 33', 38'	Stadium: Brann Stadion; Attendance: 15,991; Referee: Svein Oddvar Moen

19 April 2009 5	Vålerenga	1–1	Brann	Oslo
20:00	Moh. Abdellaoue 11'	Report	Solli 4'	Stadium: Ullevaal Stadion; Attendance: 12,614; Referee: Per Ivar Staberg

27 April 2009 6	Bodø/Glimt	0–2	Brann	Bodø
18:00		Report	Nielsen 34', 78'	Stadium: Aspmyra Stadion; Attendance: 4,037; Referee: Kristoffer Helgerud

30 April 2009 7	Brann	3–1	Lillestrøm	Bergen
19:00	Nielsen 45+1'; Huseklepp 51'; Moen 72'	Report	Riise 64'	Stadium: Brann Stadion; Attendance: 15,991; Referee: Roy Helge Olsen

9 May 2009 8	Odd Grenland	3–1	Brann	Skien
16:00	Brenne 10'; Bentley 13'; Kovács 17'	Report	Huseklepp 7'	Stadium: Skagerak Arena; Attendance: 7,789; Referee: Brage Sandmoen

16 May 2009 9	Brann	1–1	Start	Bergen
16:00	Moen 76'	Report	Stokkelien 87'	Stadium: Brann Stadion; Attendance: 17,258; Referee: Tom Henning Øvrebø

21 May 2009 10	Fredrikstad	2–4	Brann	Fredrikstad
18:00	Jóhannsson 25', 74'	Report	Einarsson 47'; Karadas 48'; Moen 58'; Bakke 78'	Stadium: Fredrikstad Stadion; Attendance: 11,145; Referee: Tom Harald Hagen

28 May 2009 11	Brann	2–0	Molde	Bergen
18:00	Jaiteh 30'; Karadas 90+1'	Report		Stadium: Brann Stadion; Attendance: 15,094; Referee: Tommy Skjerven

2 June 2009 12	Strømsgodset	2–1	Brann	Drammen
19:00	Pedersen 26', 60'	Report	Nielsen 86'	Stadium: Marienlyst Stadion; Attendance: 5,259; Referee: Per Ivar Staberg

14 June 2009 13	Brann	2–1	Lyn	Bergen
18:00	Huseklepp 53', 81'	Report	Guastavino 79'	Stadium: Brann Stadion; Attendance: 15,455; Referee: Ken Henry Johnsen

21 June 2009 14	Viking	1–1	Brann	Stavanger
20:00	Bertelsen 80'	Report	Sigurðsson 55'	Stadium: Viking Stadion; Attendance: 14,715; Referee: Espen Berntsen

25 June 2009 15	Brann	2–1	Aalesund	Bergen
21:00	Huseklepp 9'; Bakke 61'	Report	Aarøy 90+3'	Stadium: Brann Stadion; Attendance: 15,542; Referee: Kristoffer Helgerud

29 June 2009 16	Stabæk	2–1	Brann	Bærum
19:00	Keller 27'; Farnerud 80'	Report	Huseklepp 23'	Stadium: Telenor Arena; Attendance: 10,001; Referee: Espen Berntsen

6 July 2009 17	Brann	2–1	Fredrikstad	Bergen
19:00	Karadas 66'; Björnsson 90+2'	Report	Sævarsson 5' (o.g.)	Stadium: Brann Stadion; Attendance: 16,617; Referee: Tom Harald Hagen

12 July 2009 18	Molde	5–2	Brann	Molde
20:00	M. Diouf 1', 7', 10', 27'; P. Diouf 90+3'	Report	Huseklepp 46'; Björnsson 90'	Stadium: Aker Stadion; Attendance: 11,168; Referee: Tom Henning Øvrebø

26 July 2009 19	Brann	4–2	Bodø/Glimt	Bergen
18:00	Bjarnason 4' (pen.); Austin 27'; Huseklepp 56'; Moen 82'	Report	Martins 22'; Sti. Johansen 90+2'	Stadium: Brann Stadion; Attendance: 16,198; Referee: Dag Vidar Hafsås

3 August 2009 20	Lyn	2–2	Brann	Oslo
19:00	Angan 14'; Obiefule 56'	Report	Huseklepp 21'; Simonsen 66' (o.g.)	Stadium: Ullevaal Stadion; Attendance: 4,025; Referee: Svein Oddvar Moen

16 August 2009 21	Brann	4–2	Strømsgodset	Bergen
18:00	Huseklepp 54', 58'; Moen 68'; Guastavino 70'	Report	Andersson 59'; Nordkvelle 78'	Stadium: Brann Stadion; Attendance: 15,340; Referee: Roy Helge Olsen

24 August 2009 22	Brann	0–1	Sandefjord	Bergen
19:00		Report	Røyrane 14'	Stadium: Brann Stadion; Attendance: 15,652; Referee: Tom Henning Øvrebø

30 August 2009 23	Start	0–1	Brann	Kristiansand
20:00		Report	Sævarsson 72'	Stadium: Sør Arena; Attendance: 8,066; Referee: Per Ivar Staberg

14 September 2009 24	Brann	1–1	Viking	Bergen
19:00	Steenslid 73' (o.g.)	Report	Ijeh 24'	Stadium: Brann Stadion; Attendance: 16,086; Referee: Espen Berntsen

19 September 2009 25	Aalesund	3–0	Brann	Ålesund
19:00	Herrera 51'; Bjarnason 64' (o.g.); Mathisen 71'	Report		Stadium: Color Line Stadion; Attendance: 10,756; Referee: Per Ivar Staberg

28 September 2009 26	Brann	4–2	Odd Grenland	Bergen
19:00	Huseklepp 19', 49', 53'; Sævarsson 90+4'	Report	Børven 78'; Gulsvik 86'	Stadium: Brann Stadion; Attendance: 15,459; Referee: Tommy Skjerven

4 October 2009 27	Tromsø	0–2	Brann	Tromsø
18:00		Report	Huseklepp 50'; Solli 80'	Stadium: Alfheim Stadion; Attendance: 5,807; Referee: Tom Harald Hagen

18 October 2009 28	Brann	1–2	Vålerenga	Bergen
20:00	Moen 63'	Report	Shelton 33'; Sæternes 89'	Stadium: Brann Stadion; Attendance: 16,022; Referee: Roy Helge Olsen

25 October 2009 29	Lillestrøm	3–1	Brann	Lillestrøm
18:00	Pedersen 7'; Kippe 45+2'; Søgård 77'	Report	Austin 48'	Stadium: Åråsen Stadion; Attendance: 8,585; Referee: Per Ivar Staberg

1 November 2009 30	Brann	1–1	Rosenborg	Bergen
18:00	Guastavino 42'	Report	Prica 50'	Stadium: Brann Stadion; Attendance: 17,040; Referee: Espen Berntsen

==== Table ====
Pos	Team	Pld	W	D	L	GF	GA	GD	Pts	Qualification or relegation
3	Stabæk	30	15	8	7	52	34	+18	53	Qualification for the Europa League second qualifying round
4	Odd Grenland	30	12	10	8	53	44	+9	46	
5	Brann	30	12	8	10	51	49	+2	44	
6	Tromsø	30	10	10	10	35	36	−1	40	
7	Vålerenga	30	12	4	14	47	50	−3	40	

Source: fotball.no
Rules for classification: 1) points; 2) goal difference; 3) number of goals scored.

=== Norwegian Cup ===
13 May 2009 Round 1	Høyang	0–6	Brann	Høyanger
18:00		Report	Austin 22'; Bakke 45'; Björnsson 46'; Karadas 53' (pen.), 75'; Holmvik 86'	Stadium: Sletta Stadion; Attendance: 1,500; Referee: Jonny Skjerven

24 May 2009 Round 2	Lyngbø	0–2	Brann	Bergen
18:00		Report	Hansen 4'; Sævarsson 63'	Stadium: Lyngbøparken; Attendance: 2,000; Referee: Kai Erik Steen

17 June 2009 Round 3	Nest-Sotra	2–4	Brann	Sotra
18:00	Knudsen 52', 78'	Report	Nielsen 10', 25'; Karadas 43'; Hansen 69'	Stadium: Ågotnes Stadion; Attendance: 1,500; Referee: Petter Toppe

9 July 2009 Round 4	Brann	1–0	Lyn	Bergen
19:00	Solli 9'	Report		Stadium: Brann Stadion; Attendance: 6,844; Referee: Roy Helge Olsen

8 August 2009 Quarter Final	Odd Grenland	5–1	Brann	Skien
19:00	Bentley 15'; Kovács 33', 82'; Lekven 55'; Berge 90+2'	Report	Solli 73'	Stadium: Skagerak Arena; Attendance: 8,505; Referee: Brage Sandmoen

== Statistics ==
=== Appearances and goals ===
The table shows matches and goals in the Tippeligaen and Norwegian Cup, and was last updated after the game against Rosenborg BK on November 1, 2009

No.	Pos	Nat	Player	Total		Tippeligaen		Norwegian Cup	
No.	Pos	Nat	Player	Apps	Goals	Apps	Goals	Apps	Goals
1	GK	(Norway) NOR	Johan Thorbjørnsen	2	0	1+1	0	0+0	0
12	GK	(Norway) NOR	Håkon Opdal	23	0	20+0	0	3+0	0
24	GK	(Norway) NOR	Kenneth Udjus	12	0	9	0	2+1	0
2	DF	(Iceland) ISL	Birkir Már Sævarsson	29	3	25+1	2	2+1	1
3	DF	(Norway) NOR	Bjørn Dahl	7	0	3+2	0	2+0	0
4	DF	(Norway) NOR	Cato Guntveit	5	0	3+2	0	0+0	0
7	DF	(Norway) NOR	Hassan El Fakiri	32	0	24+3	0	5+0	0
18	DF	(Iceland) ISL	Ólafur Örn Bjarnason	31	4	28+0	4	3	0
20	DF	(Norway) NOR	Kristian Flittie Onstad	11	0	5+3	0	1+2	0
21	DF	(Iceland) ISL	Kristján Örn Sigurðsson	32	2	28+0	2	4+0	0
26	DF	(Norway) NOR	Bjørnar Holmvik	26	1	17+5	0	4+0	1
30	DF	(Norway) NOR	Alexander Skogvold	1	0	0+0	0	0+1	0
5	MF	(Jamaica) JAM	Rodolph Austin	24	3	18+2	2	4+0	1
8	MF	(Iceland) ISL	Gylfi Einarsson	26	1	7+17	1	0+2	0
9	MF	(Norway) NOR	Jan Gunnar Solli	32	5	24+4	3	4+0	2
11	MF	(Norway) NOR	Petter Vaagan Moen	28	6	23+2	6	3+0	0
14	MF	(The Gambia) GAM	Tijan Jaiteh	29	1	22+3	1	4+0	0
16	MF	(Norway) NOR	Bjarte Haugsdal	1	0	0+1	0	0+0	0
17	MF	(Norway) NOR	Eirik Bakke	21	3	17+1	2	3+0	1
29	MF	(Norway) NOR	Anders Næs	1	0	0+0	0	0+1	0
6	FW	(Norway) NOR	Azar Karadas	23	6	9+10	3	3+1	3
10	FW	(Denmark) DEN	David Nielsen	25	6	11+12	4	2+0	2
13	FW	(Norway) NOR	Erik Huseklepp	32	15	29+1	15	2+0	0
15	FW	(Uruguay) URU	Diego Guastavino	9	2	6+2	2	1+0	0
19	FW	(Norway) NOR	Cato Hansen	10	2	1+5	0	1+3	2
27	FW	(Norway) NOR	Matias Møvik	2	0	0+1	0	1+0	0
28	FW	(Iceland) ISL	Ármann Björnsson	13	3	0+9	2	2+2	1

=== Top scorers ===
Includes all competitive matches. The list is sorted by shirt number when total goals are equal.

Last updated on 3 November

Position	Nation	Number	Name	Tippeligaen	Norwegian Cup	Total
1	(Norway)	13	Erik Huseklepp	15	0	15
2	(Norway)	6	Azar Karadas	3	3	6
=	(Denmark)	10	David Nielsen	4	2	6
=	(Norway)	11	Petter Vaagan Moen	6	0	6
5	(Norway)	9	Jan Gunnar Solli	3	2	5

=== Disciplinary record ===
Includes all competitive matches.

Position	Nation	Number	Name	Tippeligaen		Norwegian Cup		Total	
Position	Nation	Number	Name	Booked	Sent off (straight red)	Booked	Sent off (straight red)	Booked	Sent off (straight red)
MF	(Jamaica)	5	Rodolph Austin	6	1	1	0	7	1
DF	(Iceland)	21	Kristjan Örn Sigurdsson	4	0	1	0	5	0
MF	(The Gambia)	14	Tijan Jaiteh	4	0	0	0	4	0
FW	(Denmark)	10	David Nielsen	4	0	0	0	4	0
MF	(Norway)	11	Petter Vaagan Moen	3	0	1	0	4	0

=== Overall ===
Games played	35 (30 Tippeligaen, 5 Norwegian Cup)
Games won	16 (12 Tippeligaen, 4 Norwegian Cup)
Games drawn	8 (8 Tippeligaen)
Games lost	11 (10 Tippeligaen, 1 Norwegian Cup)
Goals scored	65 (51 Tippeligaen, 14 Norwegian Cup)
Goals conceded	56 (49 Tippeligaen, 7 Norwegian Cup)
Goal difference	+9 (+2 Tippeligaen, +7 Norwegian Cup)
Yellow cards	44
Red cards	1
Worst discipline	(Jamaica) Rodolph Austin (7 (yellow card) , 1 (red card) )
Best result	6-0 (A) v Høyang IL - Norwegian Cup - 13 May 2009
Worst result	1-5 (A) v Odd Grenland - Norwegian Cup - 8 Aug 2009
Most appearances	4 players with 32 appearances (Jan Gunnar Solli, Hassan El Fakiri, Erik Huseklepp, Kristján Sigurðsson)
Top scorer	(Norway) Erik Huseklepp (15 goals)
League points	44/90 (48.9%)
