= 2008 SK Brann season =

Brann
2008 season
- Manager: Mons Ivar Mjelde
- Stadium: Brann Stadion
- Tippeligaen: 8th
- Norwegian Cup: 4th round
- UEFA Cup: First round
- Top goalscorer: League: Thorstein Helstad (11); All: Thorstein Helstad (13)

The 2008 season was SK Brann's 100th season and their 22nd consecutive season in the Tippeligaen.

== Information ==
Manager: Mons Ivar Mjelde
League: Tippeligaen
Shirt supplier: Kappa
Shirt sponsor: Sparebanken Vest
Average league attendance: 16,954
League: 8th
Norwegian Cup: 4th round (0-8 vs. Molde)
Champions League: Third qualifying round (0-1 (h) and 1-2 (a) vs. Marseille)
UEFA Cup: First round (2-0 (h) and 0-2 (a) vs. Deportivo Coruña. Brann lost 2–3 on the penalty shootout)
Top goal scorer: Thorstein Helstad (11 in league, 13 over-all)
Player of the year: Olafur Örn Bjarnason

== Season events ==
- January 16: Brann signed the Gambian-Swedish striker Njogu Demba-Nyrén from Esbjerg fB. The deal was worth about NOK 9.500.000 (Euro 1.200.000).
- January 25: Brann signed the former Lillestrøm and Leeds United-player Gylfi Einarsson to a three-year deal. The Icelandic midfielder came on a free transfer, after his release from Leeds in the summer of 2007.
- January 28: Brann signed the Australian international, Michael Thwaite to a three-year deal. He was brought in to replace Ramiro Corrales, who was sold to Major League Soccer the very same day.
- February 7: Joakim Sjöhage transferred to his old club IF Elfsborg on a one-year loan deal.
- February 13: Brann lost the first leg in the Round of 32 in the 2007-08 UEFA Cup. Everton FC won 2–0 at Brann Stadion, in what was Brann's first official game of the season.
- February 21: Brann was knocked out of the 2007-08 UEFA Cup, after being crushed by Everton in the 2nd leg of the Round of 32.
- March 30: Brann opened the Premieship-season with a 4–2 win over Fredrikstad F.K. in front of a capacity crowd at Brann Stadion. Thorstein Helstad scored a hat-trick while Azar Karadas scored with a header.
- April 19: Brann's horrific opening of the season continued after losing 0–3 to their main rivals in 2007, Stabæk. Brann was 11th in the Premiership after 4 rounds, with only 4 points won.
- May 16: Brann beat Vålerenga 1–0 in a match that saw the return of two former Brann-profiles, former captain Martin Andresen and the club's former top goalscorer Bengt Sæternes. The result sent Brann to a 5th position in the league after 7 rounds, 6 point behind Stabæk IF.
- June 18: Michael Thwaite was loaned out to Australian side; Melbourne Victory
- July 15: Brann signed the Icelandic international Birkir Sævarsson from Valur.
- July 25: Thorstein Helstad was sold to Le Mans Union Club 72. The transfer was believed to be worth around €2.000.000. Meanwhile, FC Lyn Oslo approved Brann's offer on their talented striker Odion Jude Ighalo
- July 29: Nicolai Misje was loaned out to Bryne FK.
- August 5: Brann lost 2–1 against FK Ventspils away, but still qualified for the third qualifying round of the 2008–09 UEFA Champions League after a 1–0 victory at Brann stadion.
- August 7: Espen Steffensen was sacked from his job as assistant coach, and replaced by Brann's former head coach Harald Aabrekk.
- August 29: Brann was denied entry to the 2008-09 UEFA Champions League after losing 1–2 away against Olympique de Marseille in the third qualifying round. Brann lost 0–1 in the first leg.
- August 29: Rodolph Austin signed a loan-deal with Brann.
- September 1: Brann signed Stabæk's left fullback Bjørnar Holmvik. Holmvik joined Brann on January 1, 2009 on a free Bosman transfer.
- September 18: Brann played their best match of season when they beat Deportivo de La Coruña 2–0 at home in the first leg of the first round of the 2008–09 UEFA Cup.
- October 2: Brann was knocked out of the 2008–09 UEFA Cup after losing 0–2 away against Deportivo de La Coruña. Derportivo won 3–2 on the penalty shootout.
- October 8: Mons Ivar Mjelde resigned as head coach for SK Brann after six seasons as boss on Brann Stadion. The bad results in 2008 and lack of support from the players were said to be the reason for his resignment. He agreed to lead the club in its last three games of the season. Mjelde led Brann to its first trophy in 22 years when they won the Norwegian Football Cup in 2004 and its first league championship in 44 years when they won the Tippeliga in 2007. He also led the club to bronze and silver medals in the league.
- October 26: Brann's supporters took farewell with two of their most celebrated heroes the last 5 years. Head coach Mons Ivar Mjelde, and striker Robbie Winters both made their last appearance on Brann Stadion. Winters signed with Brann in the summer of 2002, while Mjelde had been under contract with the club since 1996.
- November 11: Joakim Sjöhage was sold to Trelleborgs FF.
- November 21: Brann hired Steinar Nilsen as their new head coach. The former AC Milan and S.S.C. Napoli-player had great success with Tromsø IL in the 2008 season, and was looking for a more high profiled job. Once again Brann hired a young inexperienced head coach. Mons Ivar Mjelde was only 35 when he was hired in 2003, while Nilsen was 36-year-old when he signed with the club.
- November 26: Rune Skarsfjord was hired as Steinar Nilsen's new assistant coach. The former FK Haugesund head coach signed a three-year deal.
- November 28: Tore Kannelønning did not get a new contract offer from Brann, thus leaving the club.
- December 12: Trond Fredrik Ludvigsen signed for his old club Bodø/Glimt.

== Squad ==
Matches and goals updated as of November 21, 2008 and is for league only.

Note: Flags indicate national team as defined under FIFA eligibility rules; some limited exceptions apply. Players may hold more than one non-FIFA nationality.

No.	Pos.	Nation	Player
1	GK	NOR	Johan Thorbjørnsen
2	DF	ISL	Birkir Sævarsson
3	DF	NOR	Bjørn Dahl
4	DF	NOR	Cato Guntveit
5	MF	JAM	Rodolph Austin
6	DF	NOR	Azar Karadas
7	MF	NOR	Hassan El Fakiri
8	MF	ISL	Gylfi Einarsson
9	MF	NOR	Jan Gunnar Solli
10	FW	GAM	Njogu Demba-Nyrén
11	MF	NOR	Petter Vaagan Moen
12	GK	NOR	Håkon Opdal
13	MF	NOR	Erik Huseklepp

No.	Pos.	Nation	Player
14	MF	GAM	Tijan Jaiteh
15	DF	NOR	Erlend Hanstveit
17	MF	NOR	Eirik Bakke (C)
18	DF	ISL	Ólafur Örn Bjarnason
19	DF	NOR	Nicolai Misje
20	MF	NOR	Trond Fredrik Ludvigsen
21	DF	ISL	Kristján Örn Sigurðsson
22	FW	NOR	Thorstein Helstad
24	GK	NOR	Kenneth Udjus
25	DF	NOR	Yaw Ihle Amankwah
28	DF	ISL	Ármann Björnsson
77	FW	SCO	Robbie Winters

=== Out on loan ===
Note: Flags indicate national team as defined under FIFA eligibility rules; some limited exceptions apply. Players may hold more than one non-FIFA nationality.

No.	Pos.	Nation	Player
—	FW	SWE	Joakim Sjöhage (on loan to IF Elfsborg)
—	DF	AUS	Michael Thwaite (on loan to Melbourne Victory)

No.	Pos.	Nation	Player
—	DF	NOR	Knut Walde (on loan to Løv-Ham)
—	MF	NOR	Nicolai Misje (on loan to Bryne FK)

== Transfers ==
=== Players in ===
Only first team squad transfers

Winter 2007–08

- Njogu Demba-Nyrén from Esbjerg fB.
- Gylfi Einarsson on free transfer.
- Michael Thwaite from Wisła Kraków

Summer 2007–08

- Birkir Sævarsson from Valur
- Rodolph Austin from Portmore United (loan)

=== Players out ===
Only first team squad transfers

Winter 2007–08

- Thor Jørgen Spurkeland to NBK.
- Martin Andresen to Vålerenga
- Johan Thorbjørnsen to Sandefjord (loan)
- Ramiro Corrales to MLS
- Joakim Sjöhage to IF Elfsborg (loan)
- Knut Walde to Løv-Ham
- Arnaud Monkam to Løv-Ham

Summer 2007–08

- Michael Thwaite to Melbourne Victory (loan)
- Thorstein Helstad to Le Mans Union Club 72
- Nicolai Misje to Bryne FK (loan)

== Competitions ==
=== 2007–08 UEFA Cup ===
==== Knockout phase ====
13 February 2008 Round of 32 1st leg	Brann (Norway)	0–2	(England) Everton	Bergen, Norway
20:00		Report	Osman 59'; Anichebe 88'	Stadium: Brann Stadion; Attendance: 16,207; Referee: Anton Genov (Bulgaria)

21 February 2008 Round of 32 2nd leg	Everton (England)	6–1 (8–1 agg.)	(Norway) Brann	Liverpool, England
21:00	Yakubu 35', 54', 72'; Johnson 41', 90+2'; Arteta 70'	Report	Vaagan Moen 60'	Stadium: Goodison Park; Attendance: 32,834; Referee: Nikolai Ivanov (Russia)

=== Tippeligaen ===
==== Results summary ====
Overall								Home						Away					
Pld	W	D	L	GF	GA	GD	Pts	W	D	L	GF	GA	GD	W	D	L	GF	GA	GD
26	8	9	9	36	36	0	33	6	4	3	25	16	+9	2	5	6	11	20	−9

==== Results by round ====
Round	1	2	3	4	5	6	7	8	9	10	11	12	13	14	15	16	17	18	19	20	21	22	23	24	25	26
Ground	H	A	H	A	H	A	H	A	H	A	A	H	A	H	A	H	A	H	A	H	A	H	A	H	H	A
Result	W	L	D	L	W	D	W	W	L	D	D	W	D	L	L	W	L	D	L	D	D	W	L	L	D	W
Position	1	5	7	11	9	9	5	4	4	5	6	4	6	6	9	6	8	9	9	8	8	8	8	9	8	8

Updated to match(es) played on 2 November 2008. Source: see below
A = Away; H = Home; W = Win; D = Draw; L = Loss

==== Results ====
30 March 2008 1	Brann	4–2	Fredrikstad	Bergen
20:00	Helstad 18', 84', 89'; Karadas 63'	Report	Elyounoussi 26'; Jóhannsson 72'	Stadium: Brann Stadion; Attendance: 17,119; Referee: Tommy Skjerven

5 April 2008 2	Aalesund	4–2	Brann	Ålesund
18:00	Silva 23'; Aarøy 46'; Skiri 50'; Selimović 90+3'	Report	Parr 45' (o.g.); Winters 82'	Stadium: Color Line Stadion; Attendance: 10,778; Referee: Tom Henning Øvrebø

14 April 2008 3	Brann	1–1	Strømsgodset	Bergen
19:00	Helstad 18' (pen.)	Report	Andersen 48'	Stadium: Brann Stadion; Attendance: 17,282; Referee: Svein Oddvar Moen

19 April 2008 4	Stabæk	3–0	Brann	Bærum
19:00	Gunnarsson 10' (pen.); Nannskog 59'; Tchoyi 65'	Report		Stadium: Nadderud Stadion; Attendance: 6,515; Referee: Espen Berntsen

27 April 2008 5	Brann	2–1	Lillestrøm	Bergen
20:00	Einarsson 22'; Demba-Nyrén 44'	Report	Sundgot 40'	Stadium: Brann Stadion; Attendance: 17,228; Referee: Tom Henning Øvrebø

3 May 2008 6	Tromsø	0–0	Brann	Tromsø
19:00		Report		Stadium: Alfheim Stadion; Attendance: 7,285; Referee: Brage Sandmoen

16 May 2008 7	Brann	1–0	Vålerenga	Bergen
20:00	Helstad 77'	Report		Stadium: Brann Stadion; Attendance: 17,896; Referee: Tommy Skjerven

25 May 2008 8	Viking	1–2	Brann	Stavanger
20:00	Ødegaard 27'	Report	Jaiteh 8'; Helstad 23'	Stadium: Viking Stadion; Attendance: 16,500; Referee: Tom Henning Øvrebø

31 May 2008 9	Brann	3–4	Molde	Bergen
19:00	Sigurðsson 21'; Moen 49'; Helstad 50'	Report	M. Diouf 5', 56'; Hoseth 71'; P. Diouf 86'	Stadium: Brann Stadion; Attendance: 17,710; Referee: Kjell Alseth

4 June 2008 10	Rosenborg	1–1	Brann	Trondheim
19:00	Iversen 11' (pen.)	Report	Helstad 80'	Stadium: Lerkendal Stadion; Attendance: 20,011; Referee: Espen Berntsen

28 June 2008 11	HamKam	0–0	Brann	Hamar
18:00		Report		Stadium: Briskeby Gressbane; Attendance: 5,445; Referee: Kjell Alseth

5 July 2008 12	Brann	4–1	Bodø/Glimt	Bergen
19:00	Helstad 3', 72', 90+2' (pen.); Demba-Nyrén 45+2'	Report	Martins 70'	Stadium: Brann Stadion; Attendance: 16,845; Referee: Kristoffer Helgerud

14 July 2008 13	Lyn	1–1	Brann	Oslo
19:00	Holmen 2'	Report	Bjarnason 77' (pen.)	Stadium: Bislett Stadion; Attendance: 6,558; Referee: Per Ivar Staberg

20 July 2008 14	Brann	1–2	Aalesund	Bergen
20:00	Solli 79'	Report	Parr 27', 38'	Stadium: Brann Stadion; Attendance: 17,665; Referee: Tom Henning Øvrebø

26 July 2008 15	Fredrikstad	1–0	Brann	Fredrikstad
19:00	Wallace 52'	Report		Stadium: Fredrikstad Stadion; Attendance: 12,292; Referee: Espen Berntsen

2 August 2008 16	Brann	4–1	HamKam	Bergen
18:00	Bjarnason 34' (pen.); Karadas 69'; Vaagan Moen 87'; Demba-Nyrén 89'	Report	Abiodun 30'	Stadium: Brann Stadion; Attendance: 16,106; Referee: Svein Oddvar Moen

9 August 2008 17	Strømsgodset	2–0	Brann	Drammen
19:00	George 25', 61'	Report		Stadium: Marienlyst Stadion; Attendance: 5,814; Referee: Tom Henning Øvrebø

24 August 2008 18	Brann	0–0	Rosenborg	Bergen
20:00		Report		Stadium: Brann Stadion; Attendance: 17,552; Referee: Tom Henning Øvrebø

31 August 2008 19	Bodø/Glimt	3–1	Brann	Bodø
18:00	R. Berg 36'; Olsen 69', 80'	Report	Huseklepp 26'	Stadium: Aspmyra Stadion; Attendance: 6,391; Referee: Kristoffer Helgerud

14 September 2008 20	Brann	1–1	Viking	Bergen
18:00	Einarsson 78'	Report	Niang 73'	Stadium: Brann Stadion; Attendance: 17,296; Referee: Espen Berntsen

22 September 2008 21	Lillestrøm	1–1	Brann	Bergen
19:00	Pedersen 73'	Report	Einarsson 36'	Stadium: Brann Stadion; Attendance: 8,750; Referee: Brage Sandmoen

28 September 2008 22	Brann	2–0	Lyn	Bergen
18:00	Karadas 81'; Sævarsson 84'	Report		Stadium: Brann Stadion; Attendance: 15,833; Referee: Jonny Ditlefsen

6 October 2008 23	Molde	3–2	Brann	Molde
19:00	Mota 50', 72'; Steen 86'	Report	Moen 25'; Austin 27'	Stadium: Aker Stadion; Attendance: 6,969; Referee: Svein Oddvar Moen

19 October 2008 24	Brann	1–2	Stabæk	Bergen
20:00	Huseklepp 39'	Report	Hanstveit 28' (o.g.); Pálmason 90+2'	Stadium: Brann Stadion; Attendance: 15,879; Referee: Espen Berntsen

26 October 2008 25	Brann	1–1	Tromsø	Bergen
18:00	Bjarnason 80' (pen.)	Report	Knarvik 68'	Stadium: Brann Stadion; Attendance: 16,006; Referee: Roy Helge Olsen

2 November 2008 26	Vålerenga	0–1	Brann	Oslo
18:00		Report	Austin 17'	Stadium: Ullevaal Stadion; Attendance: 9,724; Referee: Kjell Alseth

==== Table ====
Pos	Team	Pld	W	D	L	GF	GA	GD	Pts	Qualification or relegation
6	Viking	26	11	6	9	38	32	+6	39	
7	Lyn	26	11	5	10	38	34	+4	38	
8	Brann	26	8	9	9	36	36	0	33	
9	Molde	26	7	10	9	39	43	−4	31	
10	Vålerenga	26	8	6	12	31	37	−6	30	Qualification for the Europa League third qualifying round (Note: Vålerenga qualified for the Europa League third qualifying round as 2008 Norwegian Cup winners.)

Source: fotball.no
Rules for classification: 1) points; 2) goal difference; 3) number of goals scored.

=== Norwegian Cup ===
12 May 2008 Round 1	Loddefjord	1–4	Brann	Bergen
18:00	Pilskog 87'	Report	Winters 18', 43'; Einarsson 55'; Demba-Nyrén 60'	Stadium: Alvøen Idrettspark; Attendance: 3,231; Referee: Chriss Bjorøy

7 June 2008 Round 2	Austevoll	2–3	Brann	Storebø
16:00	Heggestad 43'; Storebø 82'	Report	Winters 4'; Hanstveit 39'; Ludvigsen 70'	Stadium: Austevoll Kunstgras; Attendance: 2,500; Referee: Terje Hauge

1 July 2008 Round 3	Brann	3–1	Valdres	Bergen
18:00	Helstad 2', 31'; Bjarnason 90+2'	Report	Rabben 89'	Stadium: Brann Stadion; Attendance: 4,455; Referee: Håvard Hakestad

23 July 2008 Round 4	Molde	8–0	Brann	Molde
19:00	Mota 5'; M. Diouf 15', 52', 55'; Hoseth 33', 53', 86'; Hestad 62'	Report		Stadium: Aker Stadion; Attendance: 4,452; Referee: Espen Berntsen

=== UEFA Champions League ===
==== Qualifying rounds ====
29 July 2008 Second qualifying round 1st leg	Brann (Norway)	1–0	(Latvia) Ventspils	Bergen, Norway
20:45	Demba-Nyrén 87'	Report		Stadium: Brann Stadion; Attendance: 5,972; Referee: Radek Matějek (Czech Republic)

5 August 2008 Second qualifying round 2nd leg	Ventspils (Latvia)	2–1 (2–2(a) agg.)	(Norway) Brann	Ventspils, Latvia
17:00	Menteshashvili 6'; Rimkus 44'	Report	Björnsson 49'	Stadium: Ventspils Olimpiskais Stadions; Attendance: 2,000; Referee: Fritz Stuchlik (Austria)

13 August 2008 Third qualifying round 1st leg	Brann (Norway)	0–1	(France) Marseille	Bergen, Norway
20:45		Report	Cheyrou 40'	Stadium: Brann Stadion; Attendance: 11,197; Referee: Alexandru Tudor (Romania)

27 August 2008 Third qualifying round 2nd leg	Marseille (France)	2–1 (3–1 agg.)	(Norway) Brann	Marseille, France
20:45	Niang 65', 90'	Report	Sigurðsson 74'	Stadium: Stade Vélodrome; Attendance: 44,641; Referee: Eric Braamhaar (Netherlands)

=== 2008–09 UEFA Cup ===
==== First round ====
18 September 2008 1st leg	Brann (Norway)	2–0	(Spain) Deportivo La Coruña	Bergen, Norway
19:00	Bjarnason 25' (pen.); Solli 39'	Report		Stadium: Brann Stadion; Attendance: 8,777; Referee: Johan Verbist (Austria)

2 October 2008 2nd leg	Deportivo La Coruña (Spain)	2–0 (a.e.t.) (3–2 p)	(Norway) Brann	A Coruña, Spain
21:00	Colotto 18', 76'	Report		Stadium: Estadio Riazor; Attendance: 20,000; Referee: Pavel Královec (Czech Republic)
	Penalties
	Sergio (penalty scored); Mista (penalty missed); Guardado (penalty scored); Verdú (penalty scored)		(penalty scored) Bjarnason; (penalty missed) Vaagan Moen; (penalty missed) Bakke; (penalty scored) Austin; (penalty missed) Hanstveit

== Matches (goals) ==
The table shows matches and goals in the Tippeligaen, Norwegian Cup, Champions League and UEFA Cup, and was last updated after the game against Vålerenga on November 2, 2008.

No.	Position	Player	Premiership	Norwegian Cup	CL	UEFA	Total
1	GK	Johan Thorbjørnsen	3 (0)	0 (0)	0 (0)	0 (0)	3 (0)
12	GK	Håkon Opdal	19 (0)	3 (0)	4 (0)	2 (0)	28 (0)
24	GK	Kenneth Udjus	6 (0)	1 (0)	0 (0)	2 (0)	9 (0)
3	DF	Bjørn Dahl	22 (0)	3 (0)	4 (0)	4 (0)	33 (0)
15	DF	Erlend Hanstveit	26 (0)	3 (1)	4 (0)	4 (0)	35 (1)
18	DF	Ólafur Örn Bjarnason	22 (4)	3 (1)	4 (0)	4 (1)	33 (6)
21	DF	Kristján Örn Sigurðsson	20 (1)	1 (0)	3 (1)	4 (0)	28 (2)
23	DF	Michael Thwaite	2 (0)	1 (0)	0 (0)	1 (0)	4 (0)
25	DF	Yaw Ihle Amankwah	4 (0)	1 (0)	0 (0)	0 (0)	5 (0)
2	DF/MF	Birkir Sævarsson	8 (1)	0 (0)	2 (0)	1 (0)	11 (1)
6	DF/FW	Azar Karadas	21 (3)	4 (0)	4 (0)	3 (0)	32 (3)
28	DF/FW	Ármann Smári Björnsson	8 (0)	2 (0)	1 (1)	2 (0)	13 (1)
4	DF/MF	Cato Guntveit	13 (0)	2 (0)	0 (0)	1 (0)	17 (0)
5	MF	Rodolph Austin	9 (1)	0 (0)	0 (0)	2 (0)	11 (1)
7	MF	Hassan El Fakiri	17 (0)	3 (0)	4 (0)	2 (0)	26 (0)
8	MF	Gylfi Einarsson	14 (3)	2 (0)	2 (0)	2 (0)	20 (3)
9	MF	Jan Gunnar Solli	23 (1)	4 (0)	2 (0)	4 (1)	33 (2)
11	MF	Petter Vaagan Moen	23 (3)	2 (0)	3 (0)	4 (1)	32 (4)
13	MF	Erik Huseklepp	19 (3)	4 (0)	4 (0)	4 (0)	31 (3)
14	MF	Tijan Jaiteh	15 (1)	3 (0)	3 (0)	1 (0)	22 (1)
17	MF	Eirik Bakke	21 (0)	1 (0)	3 (0)	3 (0)	28 (0)
19	MF	Nicolai Misje	0 (0)	2 (0)	0 (0)	0 (0)	2 (0)
20	MF/FW	Trond Fredrik Ludvigsen	7 (0)	3 (1)	1 (0)	0 (0)	11 (1)
10	FW	Demba-Nyrén	17 (3)	2 (1)	4 (1)	2 (0)	25 (5)
22	FW	Thorstein Helstad	12 (11)	1 (2)	0 (0)	2 (0)	15 (13)
27	FW	Matias Møvik	1 (0)	1 (0)	0 (0)	0 (0)	2 (0)
77	FW	Robbie Winters	18 (1)	4 (3)	3 (0)	2 (0)	27 (4)
