= 2004 Norwegian Football Cup =

Norgesmesterskapet i fotball for herrer

Tournament details
- Country: Norway
- Teams: 128 (main competition)

Final positions
- Champions: Brann (6th title)
- Runners-up: Lyn

Tournament statistics
- Matches played: 127
- Goals scored: 584 (4.6 per match)
- Top goal scorer: Robbie Winters (12)

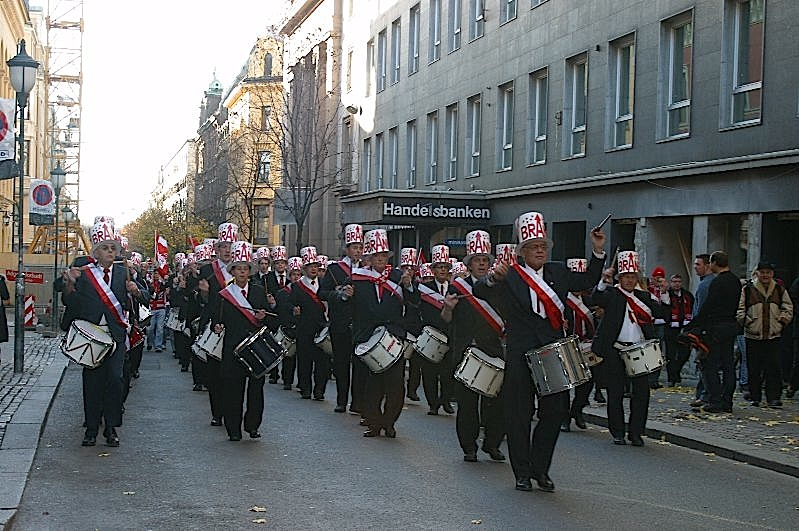
Brann supporters on the way to Ullevåll on November 7, 2004

The 2004 Norwegian Football Cup was the 99th edition of the Norwegian Football Cup. The tournament was contested by 128 teams, going through 7 rounds before a winner could be declared. The final match was played on 7 November at Ullevaal stadion in Oslo. Brann won their 6th Norwegian Championship title after defeating Lyn in the final with the score 4–1.

The clubs from Tippeligaen all made it to round 3 (round of 32). However, six Tippeligaen teams - Vålerenga, Odd Grenland, Viking, Fredrikstad, Molde and Sogndal - were knocked out in the third round. The fourth round (round of 16) saw two more top-tier clubs - Tromsø and Bodø/Glimt - being knocked out, leaving six Tippeligaen teams and two 1. divisjon teams the quarter-finals.

Brann won the cup, beating Lyn 4–1 in the final match.

== Calendar ==
Below are the dates for each round as given by the official schedule:

Round	Date(s)	Number of fixtures	Clubs
First Round	5–6 May 2004	64	128 → 64
Second Round	26–27 May 2004	32	64 → 32
Third Round	9–10 June 2004	16	32 → 16
Fourth Round	23–24 June 2004	8	16 → 8
Quarter-finals	14–15 August 2004	4	8 → 4
Semi-finals	22–23 September 2004	2	4 → 2
Final	7 November 2004	1	2 → 1

== First round ==
Team 1	Score	Team 2
5 May 2004
Kvik Halden	4–0	Groruddalen
Østsiden	0–0 (4–2 p)	Sprint-Jeløy
Sarpsborg FK	3–1	Oslo Øst
Selbak	0–2	Ørn-Horten
Kolbotn	1–2	Kongsvinger
Årvoll	0–1	Ull/Kisa
Kjelsås	0–4	Bærum
Asker	2–3	Sparta Sarpsborg
Lørenskog	2–1 (a.e.t.)	St. Hanshaugen
Skjetten	9–0	Grue
Eidsvold Turn	3–1	Strømmen
Lillehammer	1–1 (11–10 p)	Follo
Ringsaker	1–3	Nybergsund
Elverum	1–2	Mercantile
Gjøvik/Lyn	2–4	Brumunddal
Vardal	0–5	Sogndal
Notodden	1–5	Raufoss
Mjøndalen	1–2	Strømsgodset
Åssiden	1–6	Odd Grenland
Eik-Tønsberg	0–1	Frigg
Larvik Fotball	1–0	Drafn
Borre	1–9	Moss
Tollnes	4–3	Drøbak/Frogn
Langesund/Stathelle	0–7	Lillestrøm
Herkules	1–2	FK Tønsberg
Skarphedin	1–0	Donn
Arendal	0–3	Sandefjord
Vindbjart	0–6	Pors Grenland
Egersund	0–2	Stabæk
Sandnes Ulf	3–1	Klepp
Sola	0–1	Bryne
Frøyland	0–7	Start
Vidar	0–2	Ålgård
Torvastad	1–0	Åsane
Åkra	0–9	Brann
Norheimsund	1–0	Fyllingen
Solid	0–3	Haugesund
Arna-Bjørnar	0–5	Viking
Løv-Ham	6–4 (a.e.t.)	Radøy/Manger
Varegg	1–3 (a.e.t.)	Hovding
Fana	7–3	Jotun Årdalstangen
Askøy	2–3	Vard Haugesund
Fjøra	0–3	Hønefoss
Stryn	0–1	HamKam
Spjelkavik	0–9	Hødd
Volda	4–1	Kolstad
Træff	0–2	Skeid
Orkla	3–4	Strindheim
Melhus	1–6	Aalesund
Flå	0–4	Molde
Byåsen	5–2	Steinkjer
Nidelv	1–5	Mo
Levanger	3–0	Verdal
Rissa	0–15	Rosenborg
Rørvik	0–8	Bodø/Glimt
Harstad	4–2	Narvik
Lofoten	4–3 (a.e.t.)	Vesterålen
Salangen	1–7	Lyn
Skarp	4–4 (6–5 p)	Alta
Senja	0–10	Tromsdalen
Bossekop	0–8	Tromsø
6 May 2004
Bøler	2–4	Fredrikstad
Os	2–3	Vålerenga
Eiger	0–7	Mandalskameratene

== Second round ==
Team 1	Score	Team 2
26 May 2004
Brumunddal	2–7	HamKam
Eidsvold Turn	1–3	Sogndal
Harstad	0–7	Bodø/Glimt
Levanger	2–7	Rosenborg
Lillehammer	0–8	Lillestrøm
Norheimsund	0–5	Brann
Sarpsborg FK	2–8	Fredrikstad
Skarp	0–6	Tromsø
Skarphedin	0–2	Odd Grenland
Torvastad	0–7	Viking
Ull/Kisa	2–3	Stabæk
Østsiden	1–2	Lyn
Bryne	4–0	Løv-Ham
Frigg	2–0	Skjetten
Hødd	5–3 (a.e.t.)	Byåsen
Hønefoss	5–0	Lørenskog
Mandalskameratene	5–0	Larvik Fotball
Mercantile	2–3	Moss
Mo	2–0	Strømsgodset
Nybergsund	1–3	Kongsvinger
Pors Grenland	0–0 (4–5 p)	Kvik Halden
Raufoss	3–4	Bærum
Skeid	3–1	FK Tønsberg
Start	6–0	Tollnes
Strindheim	5–2	Fana
Vard Haugesund	2–1 (a.e.t.)	Sandnes Ulf
Ørn-Horten	2–4	Sandefjord
Aalesund	5–1	Hovding
Ålgård	1–2	Haugesund
27 May 2004
Volda	0–5	Molde
Tromsdalen	0–1	Lofoten
28 May 2004
Sparta Sarpsborg	0–2	Vålerenga

== Third round ==
Team 1	Score	Team 2
3 June 2004
Strindheim	1–6	Rosenborg
Lofoten	0–7	Bodø/Glimt
9 June 2004
Moss	1–1 (5–3 p)	Fredrikstad
Lyn	3–2	Frigg
Bærum	3–2	Vålerenga
Kongsvinger	2–2 (3–0 p)	Aalesund
HamKam	4–3	Skeid
Sandefjord	1–1 (5–4 p)	Start
Viking	1–2	Bryne
Haugesund	5–3	Odd Grenland
Brann	6–0	Hødd
Sogndal	1–2	Mandalskameratene
Molde	1–2 (a.e.t.)	Vard Haugesund
Mo	0–2	Tromsø
10 June 2004
Kvik Halden	1–4	Stabæk
Lillestrøm	2–0	Hønefoss

== Fourth round ==
23 June 2004
18:00 CEST (UTC+2)

Kongsvinger	0–3	Sandefjord
	Report	Ødegaard 58', 90'; Johannesen 73'

Gjemselund Stadion, Kongsvinger
Attendance: 912
Referee: Svein Oddvar Moen

23 June 2004
18:00 CEST (UTC+2)

Mandalskameratene	0–2	HamKam
	Report	Haug 30'; Frigård 42'

Idrettsparken, Mandal
Attendance: 691
Referee: Stig Rune Krokdal

23 June 2004
18:00 CEST (UTC+2)

Bryne	2–1	Bærum
Oyuga 40'; Sola 54'	Report	Klevberg 21'

Bryne Stadion, Bryne
Attendance: 1,517
Referee: Kjetil Sælen

23 June 2004
18:00 CEST (UTC+2)

Tromsø	1–1 (a.e.t.)	Lillestrøm
Strand 45'	Report	Koren 29'
Penalties
Kovács (penalty scored); Hafstad (penalty scored); M. G. Pedersen (penalty missed); S. Nilsen (penalty scored)	3–5	(penalty scored) Sundgot; (penalty scored) Kippe; (penalty scored) Viðarsson; (penalty scored) Kristoffersen; (penalty scored) Søgård

Alfheim Stadion, Tromsø
Attendance: 2,346
Referee: Tommy Skjerven

23 June 2004
18:00 CEST (UTC+2)

Haugesund	1–2	Rosenborg
Alsaker 31'	Report	Brattbakk 4'; Strand 8'

Haugesund Stadion, Haugesund
Attendance: 3,033
Referee: Per Ivar Staberg

23 June 2004
18:00 CEST (UTC+2)

Stabæk	3–1	Moss
Finstad 24'; Wowoah 79'; Gunnarsson 90'	Report	Sakariassen 50'

Nadderud Stadion, Bærum
Attendance: 826
Referee: Espen Berntsen

24 June 2004
18:00 CEST (UTC+2)

Bodø/Glimt	3–3 (a.e.t.)	Brann
Ludvigsen 17'; Olsen 72', 82'	Report	Winters 1', 62'; Hanstveit 27'
Penalties
Johansen (penalty scored); R. Berg (penalty missed); Råstad (penalty scored); Olsen (penalty scored); Hansen (penalty scored); Høgli (penalty scored); Bjørkan (penalty missed)	5–6	(penalty scored) Bjarnason; (penalty scored) Soma; (penalty scored) Guntveit; (penalty missed) Winters; (penalty scored) Hanstveit; (penalty scored) Macallister; (penalty scored) Opdal

Aspmyra Stadion, Bodø
Attendance: 1,748
Referee: Roy Helge Olsen

24 June 2004
18:00 CEST (UTC+2)

Vard Haugesund	0–5	Lyn
	Report	Berntsen 13', 35', 75'; Sørensen 33'; Hamoud 85'

Haugesund Stadion, Haugesund
Attendance: 535
Referee: Kjell Alseth

== Quarter-finals ==
14 August 2004
16:00 CEST (UTC+2)

Lyn	3–1	HamKam
Sørensen 2', 84'; Dahl 49'	Report	Frigård 60'

Ullevaal Stadion, Oslo
Attendance: 1,990
Referee: Jonny Ditlefsen

14 August 2004
20:15 CEST (UTC+2)

Lillestrøm	3–2	Rosenborg
Einarsson 39', 70', 84'	Report	Johnsen 49'; George 86'

Åråsen Stadion, Lillestrøm
Attendance: 9,035
Referee: Roy Helge Olsen

15 August 2004
18:00 CEST (UTC+2)

Sandefjord	3–4	Stabæk
Ødegaard 76', 88'; Isaksen 79'	Report	Ohr 10', 52'; Stenvoll 19'; Wowoah 67'

Storstadion, Sandefjord
Attendance: 3,035
Referee: Per Ivar Staberg

15 August 2004
20:15 CEST (UTC+2)

Brann	3–2	Bryne
Winters 65', 75'; Haugen 80'	Report	Oyuga 33'; Bjarnason 38' (o.g.)

Brann Stadion, Bergen
Attendance: 7,256
Referee: Espen Berntsen

== Semi-finals ==
22 September 2004
20:00 CEST (UTC+2)

Stabæk	1–3 (a.e.t.)	Brann
Finstad 70'	Report	Knudsen 43'; Winters 107'; Sæternes 117'

Nadderud Stadion, Bærum
Attendance: 4,527
Referee: Tommy Skjerven

23 September 2004
20:00 CEST (UTC+2)

Lyn	1–0	Lillestrøm
Sørensen 45'	Report

Ullevaal Stadion, Oslo
Attendance: 5,241
Referee: Terje Hauge

== Final ==
7 November 2004
13:15 CET (UTC+1)

Brann	4–1	Lyn
Sæternes 4', 13', 34'; Winters 8'	Report	Markstedt 11'

Ullevaal Stadion, Oslo
Attendance: 24,458
Referee: Espen Berntsen (Vang)

== Top goalscorers ==
Rank	Scorer	Club	Goals
1	(Scotland) Robbie Winters	Brann	12
2	(Norway) Harald Brattbakk	Rosenborg	11
3	(Norway) Stig Johansen	Bodø/Glimt	8
