= 2009 Norwegian Football Cup =

Norgesmesterskapet i fotball for herrer

Tournament details
- Country: Norway
- Teams: 281 (overall); 128 (main competition)

Final positions
- Champions: Aalesund (1st title)
- Runners-up: Molde

Tournament statistics
- Matches played: 127
- Goals scored: 489 (3.85 per match)
- Top goal scorer(s): Mame Biram Diouf (6 goals)

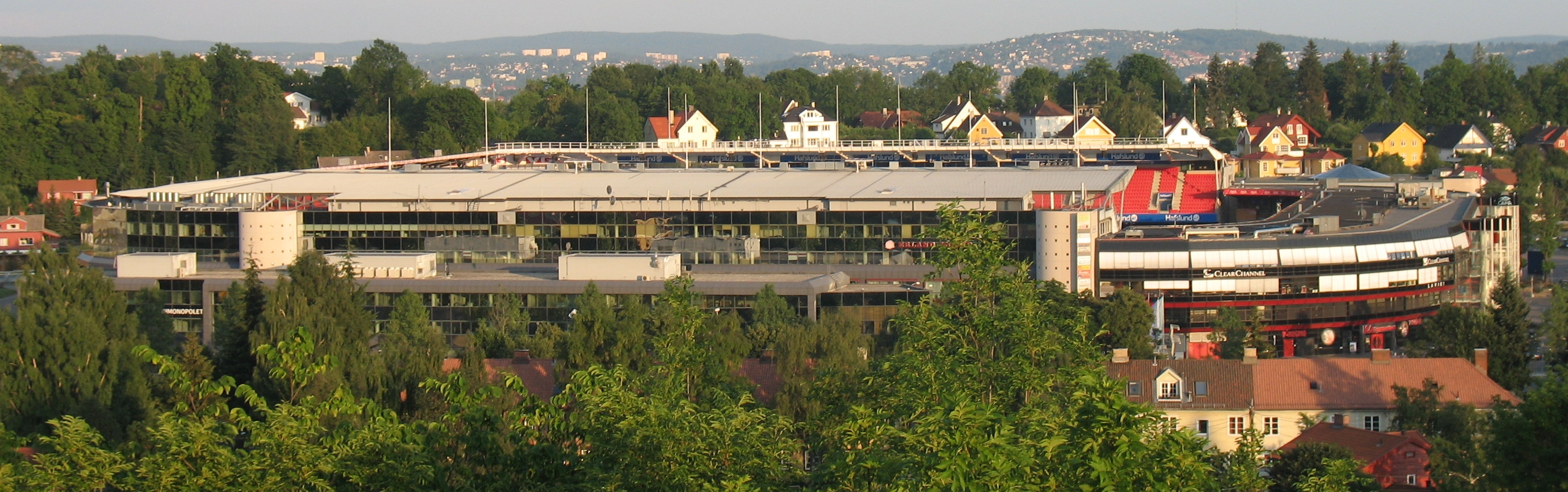
Ullevaal Stadion, Oslo - venue for the Norwegian Cup final

The 2009 Norwegian Football Cup was the 104th season of the Norwegian annual knockout football tournament. The competition started with two qualifying rounds on 13 April and 22 April, and the final was held on 8 November. The defending champions were Vålerenga.

The winners of the Cup, Aalesund, could call themselves Champions of Norway, and qualified for the third qualifying round of the 2010–11 UEFA Europa League.

== Calendar ==
| Round | Main date | Number of fixtures | Clubs | New entries this round |
|---|---|---|---|---|
| First Qualifying Round | 13 April 2009 | 102 | 281 → 179 | 204: 78th–281st |
| Second Qualifying Round | 22 April 2009 | 51 | 179 → 128 | none |
| First Round | 9–10 April 2009 | 64 | 128 → 64 | 77: 1st–77th |
| Second Round | 27–28 May 2009 | 32 | 64 → 32 | none |
| Third Round | 17–18 June 2009 | 16 | 32 → 16 | none |
| Fourth Round | 8–9 July 2009 | 8 | 16 → 8 | none |
| Quarter-finals | 7–9 August 2009 | 4 | 8 → 4 | none |
| Semi-finals | 23–24 September 2009 | 2 | 4 → 2 | none |
| Final | 8 November 2009 | 1 | 2 → 1 | none |

== First round ==
The match-ups were selected by the association on 28 April, the matches were played on 9–10 May and 13 May.

| Team 1 | Score | Team 2 |
|---|---|---|
9 May 2009
| Verdal | 1–6 | Vålerenga |
| Asker | 2–1 | Tønsberg |
| Bossekop | 0–1 | Tromsdalen |
| Eidsvold TF | 2–0 | Valdres |
| Fjøra | 0–1 | Løv-Ham |
| Flisa | 0–0 (4–5 p) | Kongsvinger |
| Klepp | 1–5 | Bryne |
| Mysen | 1–5 | Follo |
| Raufoss | 3–1 | Ullern |
| Redale | 0–1 | Nybergsund |
| Skjetten | 1–2 (a.e.t.) | Kjelsås |
| Strømmen | 2–0 | Korsvoll |
| Vindbjart | 1–3 | Randaberg |
| Ørn-Horten | 3–4 | Sarpsborg 08 |
10 May 2009
| Fløya | 0–4 | Tromsø |
| Brattvåg | 0–5 | Aalesund |
| Frigg | 0–4 | Lyn |
| Gjøvik | 0–4 | Rosenborg |
| Konnerud | 2–4 (a.e.t.) | Strømsgodset |
| Nordstrand | 0–7 | Fredrikstad |
| Odda | 1–6 | Viking |
| Sander | 0–5 | Stabæk |
| Tornado Måløy | 1–8 | Molde |
| Trauma | 1–4 | Start |
| Østsiden | 2–3 | Lillestrøm |
| Egersund | 3–3 (3–5 p) | Kopervik |
| Elnesvågen/Omegn | 1–2 | Skarbøvik |
| Elverum | 1–4 (a.e.t.) | HamKam |
| Lillehammer | 1–1 (4–1 p) | KFUM Oslo |
| Fjellhamar | 1–2 | Lørenskog |
| Follese | 1–2 | Fyllingen |
| Fram Larvik | 1–2 (a.e.t.) | Drammen |
| Frøyland | 1–4 | Haugesund |
| Grüner | 2–5 | Ullensaker/Kisa |
| Hasle-Løren | 0–2 | Drøbak-Frogn |
| Jevnaker | 1–1 (3–4 p) | Mjøndalen |
| Kattem | 1–5 | Levanger |
| KIL/Hemne | 0–2 | Byåsen |
| Kolstad | 2–3 | Ranheim |
| Kristiansund | 5–2 | Nardo |
| Kvik Halden | 2–1 | Skeid |
| Lyngbø | 1–0 | Fana |
| Lyngdal | 1–6 | Stavanger |
| Mjølner | 2–2 (9–8 p) | Harstad |
| Mo | 1–2 | Stålkameratene |
| Pors Grenland | 1–2 | Notodden |
| Rakkestad | 0–6 | Moss |
| Røa | 3–1 | Manglerud Star |
| Sandar | 0–3 | Bærum |
| Sandnes Ulf | 4–2 | Mandalskameratene |
| Senja | 0–1 | Bodø/Glimt |
| Skarp | 1–2 | Alta |
| Smørås | 0–4 | Sogndal |
| Stathelle/Omegn | 2–4 | Sandefjord |
| Steinkjer | 8–2 | Charlottenlund |
| Stord | 0–2 | Nest-Sotra |
| Strindheim | 5–0 | Tiller |
| Træff | 1–2 | Hødd |
| Vadmyra | 1–2 (a.e.t.) | Åsane |
| Vard Haugesund | 0–4 | Vidar |
| Ålgård | 3–2 (a.e.t.) | Flekkerøy |
| Årvoll | 0–3 | Hønefoss |
13 May 2009
| Høyang | 0–6 | Brann |
| Vestfossen | 0–4 | Odd Grenland |

== Second round ==
The match-ups were selected by the association on 14 May, the matches were played on 24 May, 27–28 May and 4 June.

| Team 1 | Score | Team 2 |
|---|---|---|
24 May 2009
| Lyngbø | 0–2 | Brann |
| Hødd | 0–2 | Molde |
27 May 2009
| Kjelsås | 1–2 | Odd Grenland |
| Kvik Halden | 1–4 | Stabæk |
| Strømmen | 1–2 (a.e.t.) | Lillestrøm |
| Lillehammer | 0–4 | HamKam |
| Drammen | 1–5 | Mjøndalen |
| Vidar | 1–3 | Start |
| Stavanger | 3–2 | Sandnes Ulf |
| Kopervik | 1–5 | Bryne |
| Randaberg | 2–2 (3–4 p) | Haugesund |
| Løv-Ham | 3–0 | Fyllingen |
| Ranheim | 6–0 | Steinkjer |
28 May 2009
| Drøbak-Frogn | 1–2 | Fredrikstad |
| Follo | 0–2 | Vålerenga |
| Røa | 0–6 | Lyn |
| Lørenskog | 0–1 | Notodden |
| Ullensaker/Kisa | 1–0 | Sandefjord |
| Hønefoss | 1–1 (6–5 p) | Raufoss |
| Ålgård | 2–3 | Viking |
| Kristiansund | 0–2 | Aalesund |
| Byåsen | 3–4 | Alta |
| Levanger | 0–5 | Rosenborg |
| Stålkameratene | 2–3 | Tromsø |
| Mjølner | 1–3 | Bodø/Glimt |
| Tromsdalen | 2–3 | Strindheim |
4 June 2009
| Sarpsborg 08 | 2–3 | Eidsvold TF |
| Nest-Sotra | 2–1 | Moss |
| Sogndal | 2–1 | Åsane |
10 June 2009
| Bærum | 3–1 | Strømsgodset |
| Kongsvinger | 4–0 | Skarbøvik |
| Nybergsund | 1–3 | Asker |

== Third round ==
The match-ups were selected by the association on 5 June, the matches were played on 17–18 June.

| Team 1 | Score | Team 2 |
|---|---|---|
17 June 2009
| Vålerenga | 5–3 | Ullensaker/Kisa |
| Asker | 0–3 | Lillestrøm |
| Eidsvold TF | 1–2 | Stabæk |
| HamKam | 0–2 | Lyn |
| Mjøndalen | 3–1 | Bærum |
| Notodden | 0–2 | Odd Grenland |
| Bryne | 0–0 (3–2 p) | Viking |
| Haugesund | 1–2 | Sogndal |
| Nest-Sotra | 2–4 | Brann |
| Aalesund | 2–1 | Stavanger |
| Strindheim | 1–7 | Rosenborg |
| Tromsø | 4–0 | Hønefoss |
| Alta | 3–0 | Bodø/Glimt |
18 June 2009
| Fredrikstad | 5–3 (a.e.t.) | Ranheim |
| Molde | 1–0 | Kongsvinger |
| Start | 2–2 (13–14 p) | Løv-Ham |

== Fourth round ==
This round consisted of the 16 winners from the previous round. The eight matches were played on 5, 8 and 9 July.

5 July 2009
16:00 CEST (UTC+2)

| Tromsø | 2–0 | Bryne |
|---|---|---|
| Reginiussen 10'; Rushfeldt 27' | Report |

Alfheim Stadion, Tromsø
Attendance: 1,648
Referee: Per Ivar Staberg (Harstad)

5 July 2009
16:00 CEST (UTC+2)

| Rosenborg | 2–0 | Løv-Ham |
|---|---|---|
| Sellin 49'; Konan Ya 90' | Report |

Lerkendal stadion, Trondheim
Attendance: 5,141
Referee: Svein Oddvar Moen (Haugar)

8 July 2009
19:00 CEST (UTC+2)

| Sogndal | 0–1 | Aalesund |
|---|---|---|
| | Report | Mathisen 56' |

Fosshaugane Campus, Sogndalsfjøra
Attendance: 3,512
Referee: Tom Henning Øvrebø (Nordstrand)

8 July 2009
19:00 CEST (UTC+2)

| Vålerenga | 3–1 | Mjøndalen |
|---|---|---|
| Fellah 45+3', 72'; Singh 57' | Report | Paul 81' |

Ullevaal Stadion, Oslo
Attendance: 3,013
Referee: Tommy Skjerven (Kaupanger)

8 July 2009
19:00 CEST (UTC+2)

| Alta | 0–1 | Molde |
|---|---|---|
| | Report | Skjølsvik 71' |

Finnmarkshallen, Alta
Attendance: 1,330
Referee: Espen Berntsen (Vang)

8 July 2009
19:00 CEST (UTC+2)

| Stabæk | 4–0 | Lillestrøm |
|---|---|---|
| Berglund 40', 71', 77', 90' | Report |

Telenor Arena, Bærum
Attendance: 3,788
Referee: Kjetil Sælen (Arna-Bjørnar)

9 July 2009
19:00 CEST (UTC+2)

| Brann | 1–0 | Lyn |
|---|---|---|
| Solli 9' | Report |

Brann Stadion, Bergen
Attendance: 6,844
Referee: Roy Helge Olsen (Fløy)

9 July 2009
19:00 CEST (UTC+2)

| Odd Grenland | 3–1 | Fredrikstad |
|---|---|---|
| Fevang 7'; Dokken 57'; Gulsvik 87' | Report | Piiroja 76' |

Skagerak Arena, Skien
Attendance: 5,588
Referee: Kristoffer Helgerud (Lier)

== Quarter-finals ==
The matches were played on 8–9 August.

8 August 2009
16:00 CEST (UTC+2)

| Aalesund | 3–1 | Stabæk |
|---|---|---|
| Parr 35'; Jalasto 78'; Stephenson 85' | Report | Pálmason 8' |

Color Line Stadion, Ålesund
Attendance: 4,625
Referee: Kristoffer Helgerud (Lier)

8 August 2009
19:00 CEST (UTC+2)

| Odd Grenland | 5–1 | Brann |
|---|---|---|
| Bentley 15'; Kovács 33', 82'; Lekven 56'; Semb Berge 90' | Report | Solli 73' |

Skagerak Arena, Skien
Attendance: 8,205
Referee: Brage Sandmoen (Kjelsås)

9 August 2009
16:00 CEST (UTC+2)

| Vålerenga | 4–3 | Tromsø |
|---|---|---|
| Sæternes 21', 85'; Hæstad 74'; Koppinen 90+6' (o.g.) | Report | Rushfeldt 8'; Moldskred 25', 38' |

Ullevaal Stadion, Oslo
Attendance: 4,873
Referee: Kjetil Sælen (Arna-Bjørnar)

9 August 2009
19:00 CEST (UTC+2)

| Molde | 5–0 | Rosenborg |
|---|---|---|
| M.B. Diouf 10'; Berg Hestad 52'; Hoset 57'; P.P. Diouf 74'; Mota 83' | Report |

Aker Stadion, Molde
Attendance: 11,272
Referee: Terje Hauge (Olsvik)

== Semi-finals ==
The matches were drawn on 10 August, with former Prime Minister, Kjell Magne Bondevik, drawing the first team. The team he drew were Molde, which is his favourite and hometown team. The matches are scheduled to be played on 23–24 September.

23 September 2009
19:00 CEST (UTC+2)

| Molde | 6–3 (a.e.t.) | Vålerenga |
|---|---|---|
| Hoseth 78' (pen.); P.P. Diouf 84', 95'; Thioune 105', 119'; Moström 120' | Report | Singh 45'; Moa Abdellaoue 81', 117' |

Aker Stadion, Molde
Attendance: 7,986
Referee: Svein Oddvar Moen (Haugar)

24 September 2009
19:00 CEST (UTC+2)

| Aalesund | 1–0 | Odd Grenland |
|---|---|---|
| Aarøy 60' | Report |

Color Line Stadion, Ålesund
Attendance: 10,236
Referee: Trygve Kjensli (Nesodden)

== Final ==
8 November 2009
13:15 CET (UTC+1)

| Molde | 2–2 (a.e.t.) | Aalesund |
|---|---|---|
| Biram Diouf 27', 96' | Report | Roberts 54'; Aarøy 114' |
Penalties
| Mota (penalty missed); Thioune (penalty scored); Forren (penalty scored); Steen (penalty scored); Paté Diouf (penalty scored) | 4–5 | (penalty scored) Stephenson; (penalty scored) Arneng; (penalty scored) Herrera; (penalty scored) Phillips; (penalty scored) Skiri |

Ullevaal Stadion, Oslo
Attendance: 25,109
Referee: Kristoffer Helgerud (Lier)
