= Thor Jørgen Spurkeland =

Norwegian footballer (born 1987)

Personal information
- Birth name: Thor Jørgen Haugland Spurkeland
- Date of birth: 12 May 1987 (age 39)
- Place of birth: Bergen, Norway
- Height: 1.77 m (5 ft 9 1/2 in)
- Positions: Right winger; central midfielder

Youth career
- NBK

Senior career*
Years	Team	Apps	(Gls)
2003—2006	SK Brann	1	(3)
2006	→ Løv-Ham (loan)	1	(0)
2006—2007	→ Fyllingen (loan)	0	(0)
2008—2017	Førde	130	(23)
2019	Askvoll Holmedal	12	(13)
- * Club domestic league appearances and goals as of 20 January 2008

Thor Jørgen Spurkeland (born 12 May 1987) is an inactive Norwegian footballer who played midfielder and striker.

== Biography ==
Spurkeland grew up in Knarvik, Norway and played for NBK's youth team.

In 2003, he was transferred to Brann and played his first game on 26 May 2004 against Norheimsund.

Brann won the Norwegian Cup the following season and Spurkeland was given the Kniksen Award.

He scored his first goal on 7 May 2005 in a Norwegian Cup game against Gneist.

In 2006, he was loaned to Løv-Ham, then signed a two-year contract with Brann and was sent to play for Fyllingen Fotball

In 2008, Spurkeland was selected to play for the Firdalaget team and was transferred to Førde, where he remained until 2017.

Following a two-year break from football, Spurkeland signed with Askvoll Holmedal in 2019.

He has been teaching kindergarten in Sunnfjord since 2016.
