= Bjørn Dahl =

Bjørn Dahl may refer to:

- Bjørn Dahl (footballer, born 1954), Norwegian footballer
- Bjørn Dahl (footballer, born 1978), Norwegian footballer
