= 2009 Tippeligaen =

65th season of top-tier football league in Norway

Tippeligaen
- Season: 2009
- Dates: 15 March – 1 November
- Champions: Rosenborg; 21st title
- Relegated: Fredrikstad; Bodø/Glimt; Lyn
- Champions League: Rosenborg
- Europa League: Aalesund; Molde; Stabæk
- Matches: 240
- Goals: 697 (2.9 per match)
- Top goalscorer: Rade Prica (17 goals)
- Biggest home win: Molde 8–1 Start (1 August 2009)
- Biggest away win: Lyn 0–5 Fredrikstad (1 November 2009)
- Highest scoring: Molde 8–1 Start (1 August 2009)
- Longest winning run: 8 games Rosenborg
- Longest unbeaten run: 26 games Rosenborg
- Longest winless run: 18 games Lyn
- Longest losing run: 8 games Lyn
- Highest attendance: 21,597; Rosenborg 2–2 Molde (16 May 2009)
- Lowest attendance: 2,092; Lyn 0–1 Bodø/Glimt (12 July 2009)
- Average attendance: 8,965 ▼8.6%

The 2009 Tippeligaen was the 65th completed season of top division football in Norway. The competition began on 15 March and end on 1 November. Stabæk were the defending champions. Odd Grenland, Sandefjord and Start entered as the three promoted teams from the 2008 1. divisjon. They replaced HamKam who were relegated to the 2009 1. divisjon.

== Overview ==
=== League expansion ===
This was the first top division seasons where 16 teams were competing on the highest level of Norwegian football since the 1961–62 Hovedserien season. Due to the league expanding from 14 to 16 teams, three teams were promoted from the 1. divisjon at the end of the 2008 season. Those teams were champions Odd Grenland, runners-up Sandefjord and third-placed Start. The last spot was taken by Aalesund after winning a two-legged play-off match against Sogndal.

=== Summary ===
Stabæk was the defending champions, having won their first ever League Championship in 2008. On 27 September, Rosenborg secured the title with four rounds left to go. They won their 21st top-flight title.

== Teams ==
=== Stadiums and locations ===
Locations of the teams in 2009 Tippeligaen

Note: Table lists in alphabetical order.

Team	Ap.	Location	Stadium	Turf	Capacity
Aalesund	8	Ålesund	Color Line Stadion	Artificial	10,778
Bodø/Glimt	19	Bodø	Aspmyra stadion	Artificial	7,400
Brann	53	Bergen	Brann stadion	Natural	17,317
Fredrikstad	40	Fredrikstad	Fredrikstad Stadion	Natural	13,300
Lillestrøm	46	Lillestrøm	Åråsen stadion	Natural	12,500
Lyn	36	Oslo	Ullevaal Stadion	Natural	25,572
Molde	33	Molde	Aker Stadion	Natural	11,167
Odd Grenland	28	Skien	Skagerak Arena	Artificial	13,500
Rosenborg	46	Trondheim	Lerkendal stadion	Natural	21,850
Sandefjord	3	Sandefjord	Komplett.no Arena	Natural	9,000
Stabæk	14	Bærum	Telenor Arena	Artificial	15,000
Start	34	Kristiansand	Sør Arena	Natural	14,300
Strømsgodset	22	Drammen	Marienlyst Stadion	Artificial	8,500
Tromsø	23	Tromsø	Alfheim stadion	Artificial	7,500
Vålerenga	49	Oslo	Ullevaal Stadion	Natural	25,572
Viking	60	Stavanger	Viking Stadion	Natural	16,600

=== Personnel and kits ===
Team	Manager	Captain	Kit manufacturer	Sponsor
Aalesund	(Norway) Kjetil Rekdal	(Norway) Amund Skiri	Umbro	Sparebanken Møre
Bodø/Glimt	(Norway) Kåre Ingebrigtsen	(Norway) Christian Berg	Diadora	Nordlandsbanken
Brann	(Norway) Steinar Nilsen	(Norway) Håkon Opdal	Kappa	Sparebanken Vest
Fredrikstad	(Norway) Tom Nordlie	(Norway) Hans Erik Ramberg	Umbro	Brynild
Lillestrøm	(Norway) Henning Berg	(Norway) Frode Kippe	Diadora	Nordea
Lyn	(Norway) Gunnar Halle	(Norway) Tommy Berntsen	Puma	Carrot Communications
Molde	(Sweden) Kjell Jonevret	(Norway) Daniel Berg Hestad	Umbro	Sparebanken Møre
Odd Grenland	(Norway) Dag-Eilev Fagermo	(Norway) Morten Fevang	Adidas	Skagerak Energi
Rosenborg	(Sweden) Erik Hamrén	(Norway) Roar Strand	Adidas	REMA 1000
Sandefjord	(Republic of Ireland) Pat Walker	(Norway) Birger Madsen	Puma	Jotun
Stabæk	(Sweden) Jan Jönsson	(Norway) Morten Skjønsberg	Puma	Fornebu - Nytt liv
Start	(Norway) Knut Tørum	(Norway) Ole Martin Årst	Umbro	Sparebanken Sør
Strømsgodset	(Norway) Ronny Deila	(Norway) Alexander Aas	Nike	SpareBank 1
Tromsø	(Norway) Per-Mathias Høgmo	(Norway) Sigurd Rushfeldt	Puma	SpareBank 1 Nord-Norge
Vålerenga	(Norway) Martin Andresen	(Norway) André Muri	Kappa	Hafslund
Viking	(Germany) Uwe Rösler	(Norway) Børre Steenslid	Adidas	Lyse Energi

=== Managerial changes ===
Team	Outgoing manager	Manner of departure	Date of vacancy	Table	Incoming manager	Date of appointment	Table
Fredrikstad	(Sweden) Anders Grönhagen	Health problems	16 June 2009	12th	(Norway) Tom Nordlie	27 August 2009	14th
Lyn	(Norway) Kent Bergersen	Sacked	29 July 2009	16th	(Norway) Gunnar Halle	29 July 2009	16th
Vålerenga	(Norway) Tor Ole Skullerud	Resigned	26 August 2009	11th	(Norway) Martin Andresen	9 January 2009	11th

== League table ==
Pos	Team	Pld	W	D	L	GF	GA	GD	Pts	Qualification or relegation
1	Rosenborg (C)	30	20	9	1	60	22	+38	69	Qualification for the Champions League second qualifying round
2	Molde	30	17	5	8	62	35	+27	56	Qualification for the Europa League second qualifying round
3	Stabæk	30	15	8	7	52	34	+18	53	Qualification for the Europa League second qualifying round
4	Odd Grenland	30	12	10	8	53	44	+9	46	
5	Brann	30	12	8	10	51	49	+2	44	
6	Tromsø	30	10	10	10	35	36	−1	40	
7	Vålerenga	30	12	4	14	47	50	−3	40	
8	Sandefjord	30	10	10	10	39	44	−5	40	
9	Start	30	10	10	10	46	52	−6	40	
10	Viking	30	9	11	10	38	40	−2	38	
11	Lillestrøm	30	9	10	11	43	50	−7	37	
12	Strømsgodset	30	10	6	14	40	42	−2	36	
13	Aalesund	30	9	9	12	34	43	−9	36	Qualification for the Europa League third qualifying round (Note: Aalesund won the 2009 Norwegian Cup and qualified for the third qualifying round of the UEFA Europa League.)
14	Fredrikstad (R)	30	10	4	16	39	44	−5	34	Qualification for the relegation play-offs
15	Bodø/Glimt (R)	30	6	10	14	29	53	−24	28	Relegation to First Division
16	Lyn (R)	30	2	10	18	29	59	−30	16	Relegation to First Division

Source: fotball.no
Rules for classification: 1) points; 2) goal difference; 3) number of goals scored.
(C) Champions; (R) Relegated

== Results ==
Home \ Away	AAL	BOD	SKB	FFK	LSK	LYN	MFK	ODD	RBK	SF	STB	IKS	SIF	TIL	VIF	VIK
Aalesund	—	1–1	3–0	1–1	3–1	2–0	0–2	1–2	0–3	1–1	1–0	1–1	1–1	1–1	3–2	0–1
Bodø/Glimt	3–0	—	0–2	1–1	1–1	0–2	2–4	1–1	0–4	1–0	2–1	1–1	1–0	1–1	0–2	2–0
Brann	2–1	4–2	—	2–1	3–1	2–1	2–0	4–2	1–1	0–1	1–1	1–1	4–2	2–4	1–2	1–1
Fredrikstad	0–1	2–2	2–4	—	1–0	2–1	1–2	3–0	1–4	1–2	0–1	1–0	2–0	3–0	3–1	1–0
Lillestrøm	1–1	2–2	3–1	4–2	—	2–1	0–1	1–1	1–2	2–1	1–2	3–2	2–1	2–2	1–2	1–1
Lyn	0–2	0–1	2–2	0–5	1–1	—	0–1	1–1	1–1	1–2	2–2	4–1	0–1	0–1	4–4	0–0
Molde	3–1	3–1	5–2	2–0	3–0	4–0	—	2–1	0–2	1–1	4–0	8–1	2–1	1–1	0–3	1–2
Odd Grenland	4–2	4–0	3–1	2–0	2–3	4–1	2–1	—	1–1	2–0	1–2	1–2	2–1	1–0	2–2	2–2
Rosenborg	2–1	2–0	1–1	1–0	2–1	4–1	2–2	1–1	—	4–0	1–0	2–3	3–0	0–0	3–0	1–0
Sandefjord	1–2	1–1	3–1	1–1	2–2	2–1	1–1	1–2	2–2	—	1–3	1–0	1–0	2–0	0–2	3–1
Stabæk	3–0	2–0	2–1	2–1	1–1	0–0	2–3	3–3	1–2	4–1	—	5–0	3–1	2–0	3–2	2–0
Start	0–1	4–0	0–1	1–0	3–0	1–1	2–2	1–1	1–2	3–2	2–2	—	2–2	3–1	2–0	1–1
Strømsgodset	2–0	3–0	2–1	4–1	1–2	1–1	0–2	3–1	0–1	1–1	1–0	3–3	—	2–1	3–0	2–1
Tromsø	3–1	0–0	0–2	2–0	1–1	1–0	1–0	1–1	2–4	1–1	0–0	3–1	2–1	—	2–0	0–1
Vålerenga	1–1	2–1	1–1	2–1	0–1	4–1	2–1	0–3	1–2	1–2	0–1	2–3	1–0	2–4	—	3–1
Viking	1–1	3–2	1–1	1–2	4–2	5–2	2–1	3–0	0–0	2–2	2–2	0–1	1–1	1–0	0–3	—

Source: NIFS (in Norwegian)
Legend: Blue = home team win; Yellow = draw; Red = away team win.

== Relegation play-offs ==
At the end of the season, the two last teams relegated directly to 1. divisjon, and were replaced by the winner and runner-up of the 1. divisjon who were directly promoted.

Four teams entered a play-off for the last Tippeligaen spot in the 2010 season. These were:

- A) Fredrikstad (14th placed team in the Tippeligaen)
- B) Kongsvinger (Third placed team in the 1. divisjon)
- C) Sogndal (Fourth placed team in the 1. divisjon)
- D) Sarpsborg 08 (Fifth placed team in the 1. divisjon)

First round
14	Fredrikstad	0
5	Sarpsborg 08	2
3	Kongsvinger	3
4	Sogndal	1

Second round
5	Sarpsborg 08	3	1	4
3	Kongsvinger	2	3	5

== Season statistics ==
=== Top scorers ===
Rank	Scorer	Club	Goals
1	(Sweden) Rade Prica	Rosenborg	17
2	(Hungary) Péter Kovács	Odd Grenland	16
2	(Senegal) Mame Biram Diouf	Molde	16
4	(Norway) Erik Huseklepp	Brann	15
4	(Sweden) Daniel Nannskog	Stabæk	15
6	(Norway) Arild Sundgot	Lillestrøm	11
6	(Norway) Bengt Sæternes	Vålerenga	11
6	(Senegal) Pape Paté Diouf	Molde	11
9	(Norway) Mads Stokkelien	Start	10
9	(Norway) Marcus Pedersen	Strømsgodset	10

Source: AltOmFotball.no (in Norwegian)

=== Discipline ===
==== Player ====
- Most yellow cards: 7
  - (Brazil) Marciano (Sandefjord)
  - (The Gambia) Ebrima Sohna (Sandefjord)
  - (Australia) Kasey Wehrman (Fredrikstad/Lyn)
- Most red cards: 2
  - (Jamaica) Demar Phillips (Aalesund)

==== Club ====
- Most yellow cards: 54
  - Strømsgodset
- Most red cards: 3
  - Lyn
  - Sandefjord
  - Start
  - Tromsø

=== Attendance ===
Team	Stadium	Capacity	Total	Games	Maximum	Minimum	Average	% of Capacity
Rosenborg	Lerkendal stadion	21,850	264,783	15	21,597	14,549	17,652	80.8%
Brann	Brann stadion	17,317	238,566	15	17,258	15,073	15,904	91.8%
Viking	Viking Stadion	16,600	196,060	15	15,328	11,374	13,071	78.7%
Vålerenga	Ullevaal Stadion	25,572	161,822	15	19,234	6,250	10,788	42.1%
Fredrikstad	Fredrikstad stadion	13,300	154,700	15	12,058	9,107	10,313	77.5%
Aalesund	Color Line Stadion	10,778	153,264	15	10,778	9,409	10,218	94.8%
Stabæk	Telenor Arena	15,000	142,082	15	13,409	8,115	9,472	63.1%
Start	Sør Arena	14,300	124,280	15	10,793	6,627	8,285	57.9%
Molde	Aker Stadion	11,167	119,480	15	11,168	5,741	7,965	71.3%
Lillestrøm	Åråsen stadion	12,500	114,013	15	10,287	6,334	7,601	60.8%
Odd Grenland	Skagerak Arena	13,500	110,582	15	11,295	5,055	7,372	54.6%
Sandefjord	Komplett.no Arena	9,000	87,066	15	7,810	4,967	5,804	64.5%
Strømsgodset	Marienlyst stadion	8,500	80,322	15	7,387	3,897	5,355	63.0%
Tromsø	Alfheim stadion	7,500	77,636	15	7,492	4,405	5,176	69.0%
Bodø/Glimt	Aspmyra stadion	7,400	64,244	15	5,808	3,090	4,282	57.9%
Lyn	Ullevaal Stadion	25,572	62,802	15	14,048	2,092	4,187	16.4%

Total	Games	Average
2,151,682	240	8,965

Last updated: End of 2009 season
Source: altomfotball.no (in Norwegian)

== Other ==
Team	Kit maker	Shirt sponsor	UEFA Fair Play (avg. pts.)
Bodø/Glimt	Diadora	Nordlandsbanken	7,82
Brann	Kappa	Sparebanken Vest	7,79
Fredrikstad	Umbro	Carnegie	7,77
Lillestrøm	Diadora	Nordea	7,70
Lyn	Puma	Carrot Communications	7,53
Molde	Umbro	Sparebanken Møre	7,96
Odd Grenland	Adidas	Skagerak Energi	7,97
Rosenborg	Adidas	REMA 1000	8,12
Sandefjord	Puma	Jotun	7,63
Stabæk	Puma	Fornebu - nytt liv	7,93
Start	Umbro	Sparebanken Sør	7,73
Strømsgodset	Nike	Sparebanken Drammen	7,84
Tromsø	Puma	Sparebanken Nord-Norge	7,92
Viking	Adidas	Lyse Energi	7,59
Vålerenga	Kappa	Hafslund	7,93
Aalesund	Umbro	Sparebanken Møre	7,72
