= Johan Thorbjørnsen =

Norwegian footballer (born 1983)

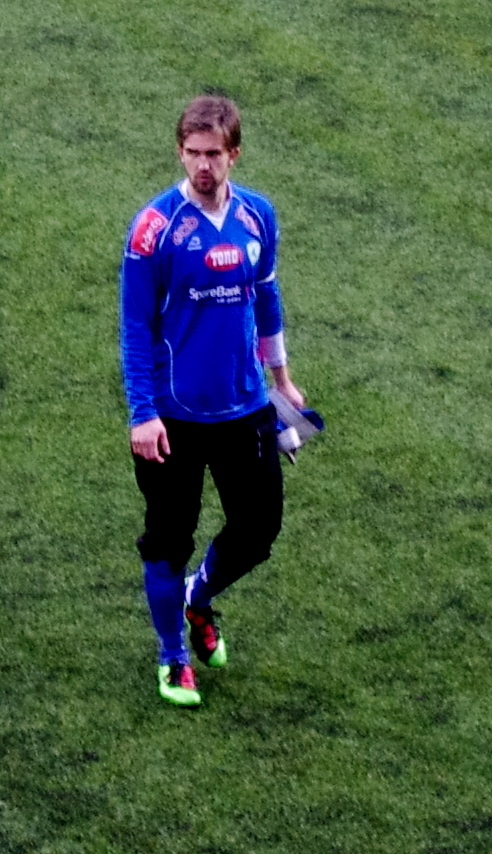

Personal information
- Full name: Johan Milde Thorbjørnsen
- Date of birth: 19 August 1983 (age 43)
- Place of birth: Bergen, Norway
- Height: 1.86 m (6 ft 1 in)
- Position: Goalkeeper

Youth career
- Nymark
- Årstad
- Hovding
- Brann

Senior career*
Years	Team	Apps	(Gls)
2004–2009	Brann	11	(0)
2008	→ Sandefjord (loan)	0	(0)
2010–2011	Løv-Ham	55	(0)
2012–2014	Fyllingsdalen	44	(0)
- * Club domestic league appearances and goals as of 11 January 2015

Johan Thorbjørnsen (born 19 August 1983) is a Norwegian former football goalkeeper.

== Career ==
Born in Bergen, he became Norwegian U20 champion with Brann's junior team in 2002. Thorbjørnsen debuted in Tippeligaen on 11 April 2005 against Molde where he kept a clean sheet. During his years in Brann Thorbjørnsen was the second-choice goalkeeper, usually playing in the first rounds of the Norwegian football cup and whenever Håkon Opdal was injured. In 2007 he played three matches when Brann won Tippeligaen.

He was loaned out to Sandefjord in 2008, but experienced some cardiac problems. In 2009, he was only the third-choice goalkeeper behind Håkon Opdal and Kenneth Udjus, and expressed a desire to leave Brann.

On 21 November 2009 he signed for Løv-Ham, where he played for two seasons before he ahead of the 2012-season was one of the first players to sign for the new second division club from Bergen, Fyllingsdalen.

== Honours ==
=== Norway ===
- Tippeligaen: 2007

== Career statistics ==
Season	Club	Division	League		Cup		Total	
Season	Club	Division	Apps	Goals	Apps	Goals	Apps	Goals
2005	Brann	Tippeligaen	2	0	0	0	2	0
2006	Brann	Tippeligaen	1	0	0	0	1	0
2007	Brann	Tippeligaen	3	0	0	0	3	0
2008	Brann	Tippeligaen	3	0	0	0	3	0
2008	Sandefjord	Adeccoligaen	0	0	0	0	0	0
2009	Brann	Tippeligaen	2	0	0	0	2	0
2010	Løv-Ham	Adeccoligaen	28	0	4	0	33	0
2011	Løv-Ham	Adeccoligaen	27	0	1	0	28	0
2012	Fyllingsdalen	2. divisjon	21	0	1	0	22	0
2013	Fyllingsdalen	2. divisjon	23	0	2	0	25	0
Career Total			110	0	8	0	118	0
