= Erik Huseklepp =

Norwegian footballer (born 1984)

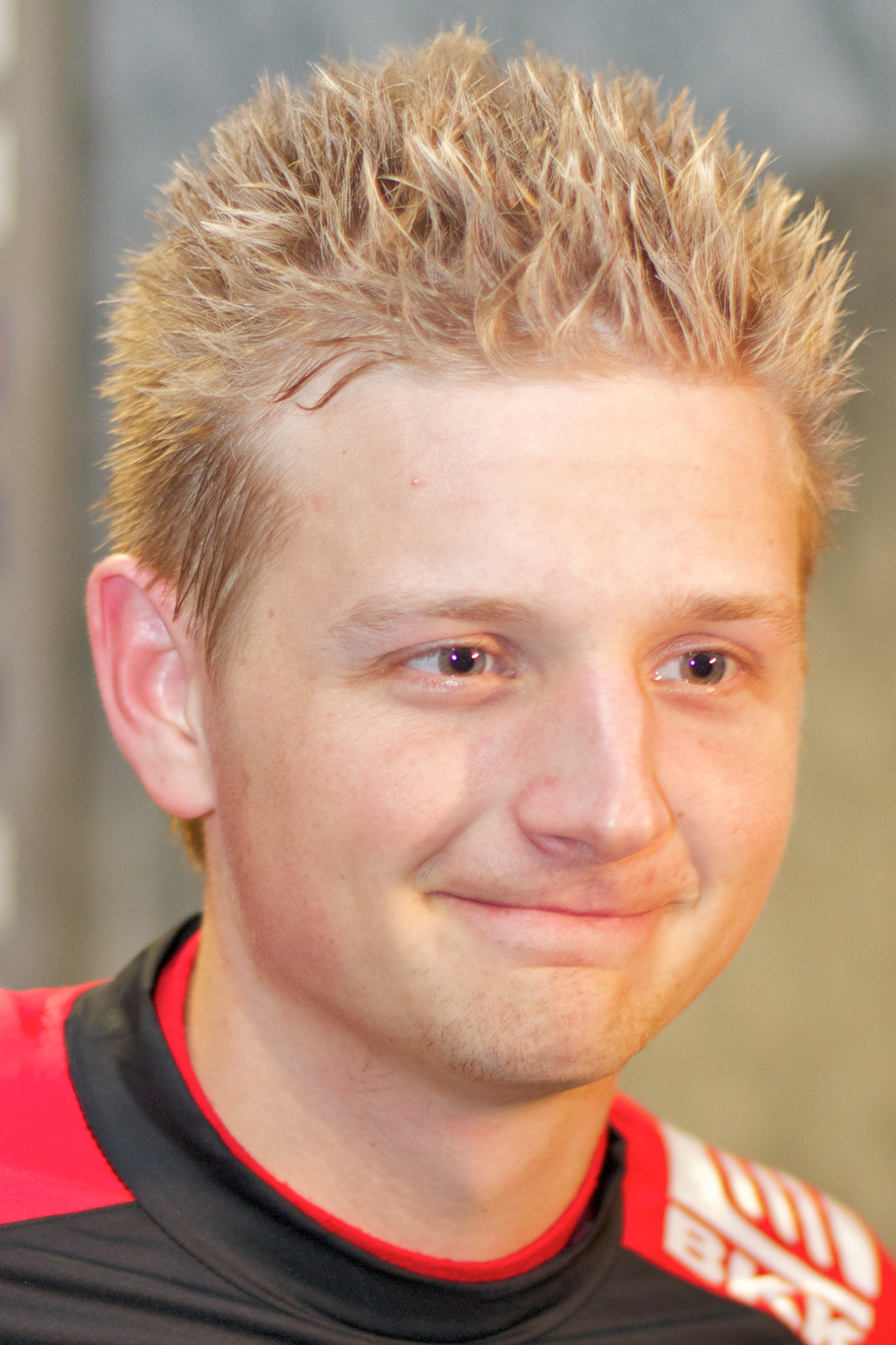
- Huseklepp in 2010

Personal information
- Full name: Erik André Huseklepp
- Date of birth: 5 September 1984 (age 42)
- Place of birth: Bergen, Norway
- Height: 1.88 m (6 ft 2 in)
- Positions: Second striker; winger

Youth career
- –: Bjarg
- –2000: Fyllingen
- 2000–2004: Vadmyra

Senior career*
Years	Team	Apps	(Gls)
2004–2005	Fyllingen	42	(9)
2005–2010	Brann	120	(29)
2011	Bari	14	(2)
2011–2012	Portsmouth	27	(6)
2012	→ Birmingham City (loan)	11	(2)
2012–2016	Brann	128	(26)
2017	Haugesund	15	(1)
2017	→ Åsane (loan)	12	(6)
2018–2019	Åsane	20	(6)
2019–2021	Fyllingsdalen	37	(16)
Total		426	(103)

International career
2005–2006	Norway U21	8	(1)
2008–2014	Norway	36	(7)

Managerial career
- 2019–2021: Fyllingsdalen (assistant)
- 2022–2024: Brann (assistant)
- 2026–: Brann (assistant)
- * Club domestic league appearances and goals

Erik André Huseklepp (born 5 September 1984) is a Norwegian professional football coach and former player who is currently assistant manager of Eliteserien club Brann. A former forward, he previously played for Fyllingen and Brann in Norway, for Bari in Italy, and for Portsmouth and Birmingham City in England. He is the son of Ingvald Huseklepp, a former winger for Brann in the late 1970s.

== Club career ==
=== Early career ===
At the age of 16 Huseklepp played youth football for Fyllingen. After two seasons in Vadmyra IL, where he played both junior and senior football, he returned to Fyllingen, this time in the senior team.

=== Brann ===
Huseklepp played in the Norwegian Second Division in 2004 and the first half of 2005, but left on 10 August to sign for Brann, because he was not given a place in the junior squad. He scored nineteen seconds into his first league match as a starter, and subsequently became a first team regular.

In 2006, Huseklepp had a hard time making the first team, starting just six games in the Norwegian Premier League and being substituted in all of them. The 2007 season was much the same, with Brann coach Mons Ivar Mjelde preferring to use Huseklepp as an impact player, taking on tiring defenders in the closing stages of the game. Huseklepp signalled that he would not sign a new contract with Brann, and as he has made himself a name as a flamboyant and technically gifted winger, a number of clubs were interested in signing the player. However, in November 2007, Huseklepp signed a new three-year contract with Brann. The team became league champions that year.

=== Bari ===
In January 2011 Huseklepp completed a move to Serie A club Bari for €1.75 million. He played 14 games and scored two goals for the club, but they were relegated to Serie B and due to financial difficulties were forced to put Huseklepp up for sale.

=== Portsmouth ===
On 16 August 2011, Huseklepp signed a three-year contract with English Championship (second-tier) club Portsmouth; the fee was reported as £1.5 million. He made his debut in a 0–0 draw with Bristol City, replacing Liam Lawrence in the 87th minute. He scored his first goal against Blackpool on 24 September with a stoppage-time winner. Three days later he scored a last-minute own goal that made Portsmouth lose 3–2 at home to Peterborough United. He then scored two goals against Nottingham Forest in a 3–0 win on 5 November. On 28 January 2012, Huseklepp scored two goals in a 3–0 victory against Peterborough United. Huseklepp was the subject of a viral video created by the YouTuber KSI during his time at Portsmouth.

=== Birmingham City ===
With Portsmouth in administration, the club informed Huseklepp that they needed him to accept a loan move to Championship rivals Birmingham City in order to help relieve their financial difficulties. Although reluctant to leave Portsmouth, where he had established a good relationship with the fans, he complied with the request, and joined Birmingham on 23 February 2012 on loan until the end of the season. He made his debut for the club a couple of days later in a 2–1 defeat at home to Nottingham Forest.

=== Return to Brann ===
After the Birmingham loan expired, Huseklepp could not gain a deal with Blues, and returned to Portsmouth, with his club suffering relegation. As the club was in administration, he was linked with various clubs, most of them from his homeland. Brann was the most hopeful ahead the deal, and was appealing for sponsorship to sign the player. After the departure of Rodolph Austin to Leeds United, the Norwegian club provided funds, and on 28 July 2012, it was announced that Brann had reached a verbal agreement with Huseklepp. Huseklepp changed shirt-number ahead of the 2013 season to number 23, which was used by Tomasz Sokolowski the previous season. The change was part of a sponsor-agreement with Auto 23 who paid parts of the transfer-fee when Huseklepp returned to Brann.

=== Haugesund and loan to Åsane ===
For the 2017 season Huseklepp signed with Haugesund.

In July 2017 he joined Norwegian second-tier side Åsane on loan for the rest of the season. During the loan, he scored 6 goals in 12 matches.

=== Åsane ===
In November 2017, it was announced that Huseklepp had terminated his contract with Haugesund and signed permanently with Åsane.

=== Return to Fyllingen ===
Huseklepp went back to Fyllingen as player and assistant on 7 January 2019.

== International career ==
On 12 August 2009, Huseklepp scored his first international goal in the 60th minute of the 4–0 victory over Scotland, after strike partner John Carew had hit both posts. He was awarded Man of the Match by the viewers in his international debut which he played from the start. Huseklepp was the first player hailing from Bergen since 1963 to score for the national team. He scored the winning goal against Portugal during the UEFA Euro 2012 qualifying in a 1–0 win.

After he played his 25th match at international level against Cyprus in October 2011, Huseklepp also became the first player from Bergen to receive the Gold Watch since Helge Karlsen in 1977. As of February 2013, he has been capped 33 times for Norway, scoring seven goals.

== Coaching career ==
Huseklepp was appointed as assistant coach at Brann on 5 January 2022, as part of the coaching staff under manager Eirik Horneland.

== Career statistics ==
=== Club ===
As of 15 September 2019

Appearances and goals by club, season and competition
Club	Season	League			Cup		Europe		Total	
Club	Season	Division	Apps	Goals	Apps	Goals	Apps	Goals	Apps	Goals
Fyllingen	2004	2. divisjon	25	8	0	0	—		25	8
Fyllingen	2005	2. divisjon	17	1	0	0	—		17	1
Fyllingen	Total		42	9	0	0	—		42	9
Brann	2005	Tippeligaen	9	1	0	0	2	0	11	1
Brann	2006	Tippeligaen	11	0	4	1	3	0	18	1
Brann	2007	Tippeligaen	22	1	4	1	10	1	36	3
Brann	2008	Tippeligaen	18	2	4	0	8	0	30	2
Brann	2009	Tippeligaen	30	15	2	0	—		32	15
Brann	2010	Tippeligaen	30	10	1	0	—		31	10
Brann	Total		120	29	15	2	23	1	158	32
Bari	2010–11	Serie A	14	2	0	0	—		14	2
Portsmouth	2011–12	Championship	27	6	1	0	—		28	6
Birmingham City	2011–12	Championship	11	2	0	0	0	0	11	2
Brann	2012	Tippeligaen	12	4	2	1	0	0	14	5
Brann	2013	Tippeligaen	30	7	1	1	0	0	31	8
Brann	2014	Tippeligaen	30	3	5	3	0	0	35	6
Brann	2015	OBOS-ligaen	30	8	4	2	0	0	34	10
Brann	2016	Tippeligaen	26	4	0	0	0	0	26	4
Brann	Total		128	26	12	7	0	0	140	33
Haugesund	2017	Eliteserien	15	1	3	2	4	1	22	4
Åsane (loan)	2017	OBOS-ligaen	12	6	0	0	0	0	12	6
Åsane	2018	OBOS-ligaen	20	6	1	1	0	0	21	7
Fyllingsdalen	2019	Norsk Tipping-ligaen	25	12	2	2	0	0	27	14
Fyllingsdalen	2021	Norsk Tipping-ligaen	12	4	2	1	0	0	14	5
Fyllingsdalen	Total		37	16	4	3	0	0	41	19
Career total			426	103	36	15	27	2	489	120

=== International ===
Scores and results list Norway's goal tally first, score column indicates score after each Huseklepp goal.

List of international goals scored by Erik Huseklepp
No.	Date	Venue	Opponent	Score	Result	Competition
1	12 August 2009	Ullevaal Stadion, Oslo	Scotland	3–0	4–0	World Cup 2010 qualifying
2	11 August 2010	Ullevaal Stadion, Oslo	France	1–1	2–1	Friendly
3	11 August 2010	Ullevaal Stadion, Oslo	France	2–1	2–1	Friendly
4	7 September 2010	Ullevaal Stadion, Oslo	Portugal	1–0	1–0	UEFA Euro 2012 qualifying
5	17 November 2010	Aviva Stadium, Dublin	Republic of Ireland	2–1	2–1	Friendly
6	26 March 2011	Ullevaal Stadion, Oslo	Denmark	1–1	1–1	UEFA Euro 2012 qualifying
7	12 November 2011	Cardiff City Stadium, Cardiff	Wales	1–2	1–4	Friendly

== Honours ==
Brann

- Tippeligaen: 2007
