= Denis Selimović =

Slovenian footballer

Denis Selimovič
Personal information
- Full name: Denis Selimovič
- Date of birth: 22 June 1979 (age 47)
- Place of birth: SFR Yugoslavia
- Height: 1.78 m (5 ft 10 in)
- Position: Defensive midfielder

Senior career*
Years	Team	Apps	(Gls)
1999–2001	Ljubljana	44	(2)
2001	Triglav Kranj	0	(0)
2001–2004	Ljubljana	61	(2)
2004	Drava Ptuj	26	(0)
2005	Ljubljana	11	(0)
2005–2007	Primorje	28	(0)
2007–2009	Aalesund	15	(1)
2009–2010	Željezničar Sarajevo	10	(0)
2010–2011	Interblock	22	(2)
2012	Keflavík	16	(0)
2013	Šenčur	10	(0)
- * Club domestic league appearances and goals as of 29 September 2012

Denis Selimovič (born 22 June 1979) is a Slovenian retired professional footballer who played for Icelandic Premier League club Keflavik Football Club. He is of Bosnian origin.

Selimovič previously played for several Slovenian Premier league clubs, including Triglav Kranj, Ljubljana, Drava Ptuj, Primorje Ajdovščina and Interblock Ljubljana. He also played for Norwegian club Aalesunds FK in the Norwegian PL Tippeligaen and Bosnian club Željezničar Sarajevo in the Bosnian Premier League.

== Post-playing career ==
During his career, Selimovič earned a bachelor's degree in economics. After retiring as a professional footballer, he stayed involved in the football industry as a football agent. He also obtained a UEFA PRO Coaching Licence, and earned a master's degree in sports management from the University of Ljubljana. Selimovič is fluent in English, German and the languages of Balkan countries, including Croatian, Serbian and Bosnian.
