= Glenn Roberts =

Glenn or Glen Roberts may refer to:

- Glenn Roberts (basketball) (1918–1980), American basketball player
- Fireball Roberts (Edward Glenn Roberts Jr., 1925-1964), American NASCAR driver
- Glenn Roberts (cricketer) (born 1973), English cricketer
- Glenn Roberts (footballer) (born 1988), Norwegian footballer
- Glen Roberts, songwriter and producer on the 2025 EP All This to Say I Love You

== See also ==
- Glenn Robertson (born 1949/50), Canadian politician
- Glenn Robertson (footballer) (born 1952), Australian rules footballer
- Glen Robertson (born 1959), American politician, mayor of Lubbock, Texas
- Glen Robertson, a village in the township of North Glengarry, Ontario, Canada
