= Kristian Flittie Onstad =

Norwegian footballer (born 1984)

Personal information
- Date of birth: 9 May 1984 (age 42)
- Place of birth: Norway
- Height: 1.86 m (6 ft 1 in)
- Position: Defender

Team information
- Current team: Mjøndalen
- Number: 27

Youth career
- Gjelleråsen
- Lyn

Senior career*
Years	Team	Apps	(Gls)
2001–2006	Lyn	73	(0)
2006–2010	Esbjerg	68	(0)
2009	→ Brann (loan)	8	(0)
2010	Stabæk	10	(0)
2010	Raufoss		
2011–2012	Ull/Kisa	49	(8)
2013–	Mjøndalen	30	(0)
	Moss	0	(0)

International career
2003–2006	Norway U-21	34	(2)
- * Club domestic league appearances and goals as of 22 November 2013

Kristian Flittie Onstad (born 9 May 1984) is a Norwegian professional football defender who plays for Moss.

== Career ==
He comes from a little place in Skedsmo, Lahaugmoen. He went to NTG (Norges Toppidrettsgymnas) high school. Kristian started his senior career at Lyn. At Lyn, he made 73 appearances.

In 2006, Kristian had a transfer to the Danish elite club Esbjerg FB. In the 2009 season he was loaned out to SK Brann. After a loan spell at SK Brann, he was released from his contract at Esbjerg FB. On 18 January 2010 Kristian signed a three-year deal with Stabæk Fotball. It was terminated in the summer. In August 2010 he joined Raufoss IL. Ahead of the 2011 he joined Ull/Kisa. In April 2013 he signed a contract with Mjøndalen. Onstad has, as of December 2013, joined Moss.
