= Håkon Opdal =

Norwegian footballer (born 1982)

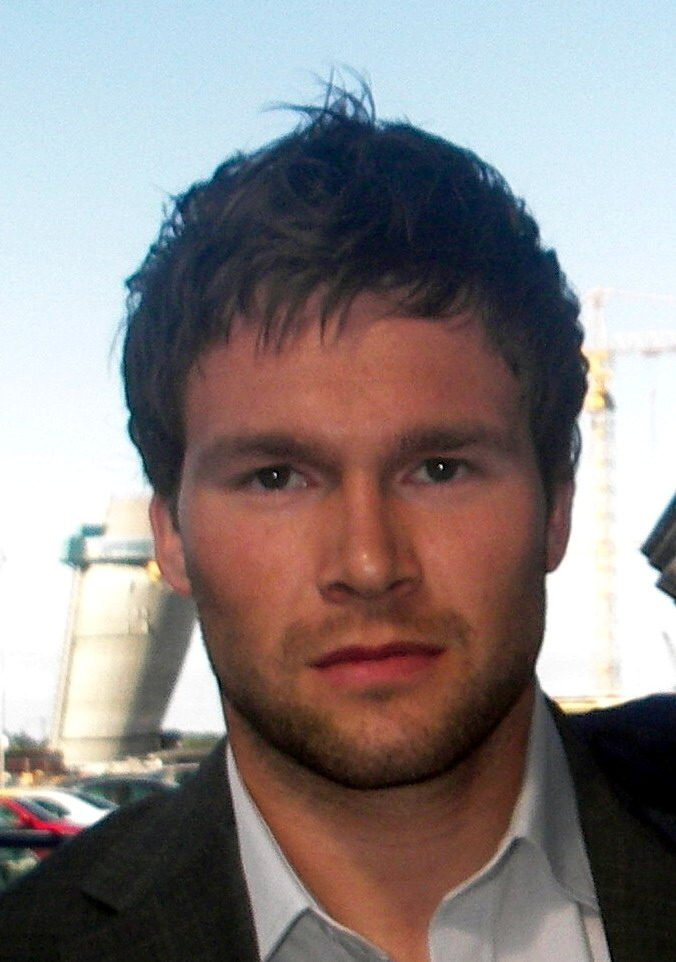

Personal information
- Full name: Håkon Eikemo Opdal
- Date of birth: 11 June 1982 (age 44)
- Place of birth: Odda Municipality, Norway
- Height: 1.88 m (6 ft 2 in)
- Position: Goalkeeper

Youth career
- Odda

Senior career*
Years	Team	Apps	(Gls)
2001–2011	Brann	178	(0)
2012	SønderjyskE	13	(0)
2013–2018	Start	141	(1)
2019–2021	Brann	56	(0)
Total		388	(1)

International career
2002–2004	Norway U21	13	(0)
2006–2008	Norway	12	(0)
- * Club domestic league appearances and goals

Håkon Eikemo Opdal (born 11 June 1982) is a Norwegian former professional footballer who played as a goalkeeper. He played for Brann and Start, where he won Tippeligaen in 2007 and the Norwegian Cup in 2004.

While playing for Brann, Opdal was awarded Kniksen Award as the best goalkeeper in Norway in 2006 and 2007, and he was also the first choice goalkeeper at the Norwegian national team where he was capped 12 times between 2006 and 2008.

== Club career ==
Opdal was born in Odda Municipality, and played for Odda FK until he joined SK Brann in 2000. Opdal made his debut for the first team in the Third Round match of the 2001 Norwegian Football Cup against Ørn-Horten. He made his debut in Tippeligaen in the match against Rosenborg on 27 October 2002. Opdal was reserve to Ivar Rønningen for a couple of seasons, but Opdal made his breakthrough during the 2003 season, when he started some matches in Tippeligaen. Opdal became regular in the starting lineup when Rønningen was sold in the middle of the 2004 season, leaving Opdal with competition from Johan Thorbjørnsen. Opdal became a hero in one of his first starts. In a game in the 2004 Norwegian Football Cup against Bodø/Glimt the score was 3–3 at the end of regular time. In the penalty shootout, Opdal saved a penalty from Aasmund Bjørkan and later scored the winning penalty himself. Brann carried on to win the cup that year.

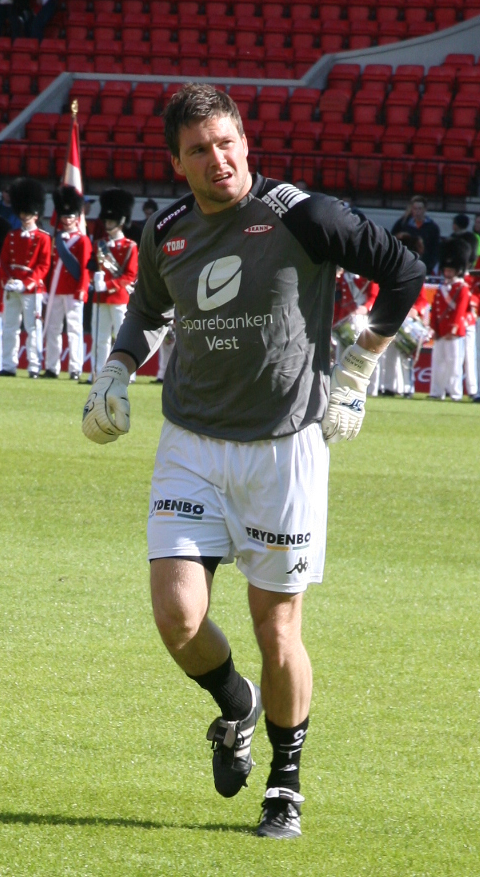
Håkon Opdal while playing for Brann.

Opdal performance as goalkeeper in Brann was awarded with the Kniksen Award in 2006. and in 2007 Opdal was one of the most important contributors when Brann won Tippeligaen in 2007 and Opdal was again awarded the Kniksen Award. In 2008 and 2009 Opdal suffered from injuries. Opdal was made captain of Brann by Steinar Nilsen ahead of the 2009 season instead of Eirik Bakke. Opdal was the captain of Brann until the 2011 season when Rune Skarsfjord stated that he wanted an outfield player to be captain.

Opdal was Brann's first choice until Piotr Leciejewski arrived at the club in 2011, and when his contract expired after the 2011 season Opdal was not offered a contract renewal. Still without a contract, Brann wanted to sign Opdal on a short-term contract in May 2012 as both Leciejewski and Jørgen Mohus were injured, but Opdal rejected Brann's offer due to a knee-injury. Opdal joined the Danish Superliga side SønderjyskE in June 2012, and made his debut for the club in the 6–1 win against Randers in the opening match of the season.

On 25 September 2015, Opdal scored a free kick goal from the half-way line for Start against Vålerenga.

On 14 August 2018, Opdal signed a two-year deal for his former club SK Brann, starting from 1 January 2019, when his contract with IK Start expired. He announced his retirement from professional football after the 2021 season in early November 2021.

== International career ==
Opdal played eight matches for Norway U16 in 1998, five matches for the under-17 team in 1999 and six matches for the under-18 team in 2000. He was also capped for Norway U21, where he played 13 matches between 2000 and 2002.

Opdal was called up for the senior team for the first time in May 2006, and when Thomas Myhre was injured Opdal made his debut against Serbia on 15 November 2006. Opdal played 12 matches between 2006 and 2008 and was the first choice goalkeeper for the national team. After playing in the 3–1 loss against Montenegro in March 2008, Opdal lost his position as first-choice goalkeeper to Rune Jarstein. When Jarstein was made unavailable for the friendly match against Finland in April 2009, Opdal was again called up for the national team, but stayed on the bench with Jon Knudsen playing 90 minutes.

== Career statistics ==
=== Club ===
Appearances and goals by club, season and competition
Club	Season	League			National cup		Europe		Total	
Club	Season	Division	Apps	Goals	Apps	Goals	Apps	Goals	Apps	Goals
Brann	2001	Tippeligaen	0	0	1	0	1	0	2	0
Brann	2002	Tippeligaen	1	0	1	0	–		2	0
Brann	2003	Tippeligaen	13	0	3	0	–		16	0
Brann	2004	Tippeligaen	16	0	7	0	–		23	0
Brann	2005	Tippeligaen	24	0	4	0	4	0	32	0
Brann	2006	Tippeligaen	25	0	2	0	1	0	28	0
Brann	2007	Tippeligaen	25	0	1	0	9	0	35	0
Brann	2008	Tippeligaen	18	0	3	0	4	0	25	0
Brann	2009	Tippeligaen	20	0	3	0	–		23	0
Brann	2010	Tippeligaen	30	0	0	0	–		30	0
Brann	2011	Tippeligaen	6	0	1	0	–		7	0
Brann	Total		178	0	26	0	19	0	223	0
SønderjyskE	2012–13	Danish Superliga	13	0	0	0	–		13	0
Start	2013	Tippeligaen	30	0	3	0	–		33	0
Start	2014	Tippeligaen	20	0	1	0	–		21	0
Start	2015	Tippeligaen	29	1	0	0	–		29	1
Start	2016	Tippeligaen	30	0	1	0	–		31	0
Start	2017	OBOS-ligaen	28	0	0	0	–		28	0
Start	2018	Eliteserien	4	0	2	0	–		6	0
Start	Total		141	1	7	0	0	0	148	1
Brann	2019	Eliteserien	27	0	1	0	2	0	30	0
Brann	2020	Eliteserien	17	0	0	0	–		17	0
Brann	2021	Eliteserien	12	0	0	0	–		12	0
Brann	Total		56	0	1	0	2	0	59	0
Career total			388	1	34	0	21	0	443	1

== Honours ==
Norway

- Tippeligaen: 2007
- Norwegian Cup: 2004

Individual

- Kniksen award Goalkeeper of the Year: 2006 and 2007
