= Matias Møvik =

Norwegian footballer (born 1991)

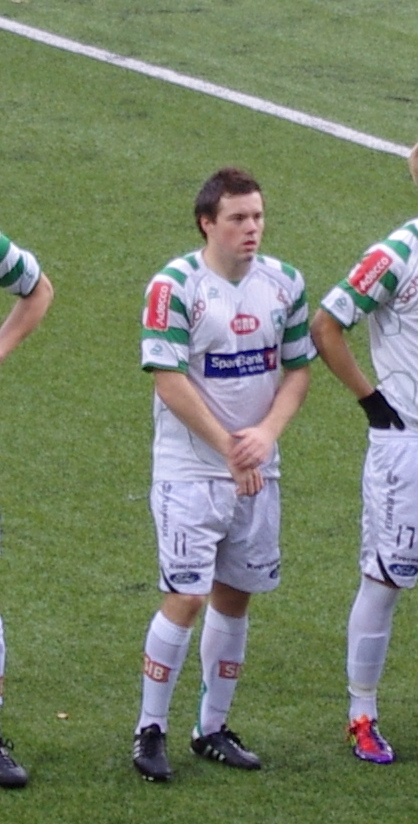

Personal information
- Full name: Matias Jordal Møvik
- Date of birth: 16 May 1991 (age 35)
- Place of birth: Bergen, Norway
- Position: Striker

Team information
- Current team: Fana
- Number: 14

Youth career
- Eikanger

Senior career*
Years	Team	Apps	(Gls)
2008–2010	Brann	2	(0)
2010	→ Løv-Ham (loan)	21	(2)
2011	Løv-Ham	14	(0)
2012–	Fana		
- * Club domestic league appearances and goals as of November 13, 2010

Matias Møvik (born 16 May 1991) is a Norwegian footballer who currently plays for Fana IL.

He joined Fana from Løv-Ham ahead of the 2012 season.
