= Nicolai Misje =

Norwegian footballer (born 1987)

Personal information
- Full name: Nicolai Misje
- Date of birth: 22 December 1987 (age 38)
- Place of birth: Bergen, Norway
- Height: 1.80 m (5 ft 11 in)
- Positions: Left winger; central midfielder; striker

Team information
- Current team: Åsane
- Number: 9

Youth career
- SK Brann

Senior career*
Years	Team	Apps	(Gls)
2004–2008	SK Brann	1	(0)
2008	→ Bryne FK (loan)	3	(0)
2009	Alta	8	(0)
2010	Løv-Ham	0	(0)
2010	→ Fyllingen (loan)		
2011	Fyllingen	15	(6)
2012–	Åsane		
- * Club domestic league appearances and goals as of 13 July 2011

Nicolai Misje (born 22 December 1987) is a Norwegian footballer who plays for Åsane.

Born in Bergen, he joined SK Brann as a product of Brann's own junior team. He debuted against Fredrikstad FK in autumn 2005.

Misje has been troubled by injuries. In November 2006 it was revealed that Misje suffered from chronic fatigue syndrome which he developed after struggling with glandular fever. It was unknown when or if he would ever return to the pitch. However, in November 2007 Brann gave Misje a new contract because he had recovered. In the first round of the Norwegian Football Cup 2008, Misje made his first appearance since 2006. He joined Bryne FK on loan in 2008, and ahead of the 2009 season he joined Alta IF in the second highest league. He returned to Bergen and Løv-Ham.

He later joined Fyllingen, first on loan in August 2010, then permanently in 2011. In 2012, he moved to Åsane.
