= Gylfi Einarsson =

Icelandic footballer (born 1978)

Personal information
- Date of birth: 27 October 1978 (age 47)
- Place of birth: Reykjavík, Iceland
- Height: 1.81 m (5 ft 11 1/2 in)
- Position: Midfielder

Youth career
- Fylkir

Senior career*
Years	Team	Apps	(Gls)
1996–2000	Fylkir	54	(18)
2000–2004	Lillestrøm	83	(16)
2004–2007	Leeds United	21	(1)
2008–2010	Brann	43	(4)
2011	Fylkir	14	(1)

International career^{‡}
2000–2005	Iceland	24	(1)
- * Club domestic league appearances and goals as of 11 January 2012 ‡ National team caps and goals as of 11 January 2012

Gylfi Einarsson (born 27 October 1978) is an Icelandic retired football player. He played as a midfielder.

== Club career ==
He started his career at Fylkir but moved to Norwegian club Lillestrøm SK in 2000. In the 2004 season he scored 13 goals in 26 matches. When his contract expired, he was snapped up by Leeds United, who had to wait until January 2005 to sign him. Gylfi, who was originally seen as a player in the Gary Speed mould, had never been more than a bit-player at Elland Road. This was mainly due to the injury problems that he sustained during his time at the club. On 6 September 2006, Gylfi had a hip operation to remove floating bone and was out of contention for the squad for eight weeks. In January 2007, Gylfi was subject to interest from Norwegian team, Strømsgodset. Gylfi left Leeds United on the final day of the summer transfer window in the 2007/08 campaign, with his contract being terminated. He scored one league goal during his stay at Leeds, in a 1–0 win at Burnley.

Gylfi signed with the reigning Norwegian champions, SK Brann, on 25 January 2008, after a short try-out.

== International career ==
Gylfi made his debut for Iceland in a July 2000 friendly match against Malta as a sub for Helgi Kolviðsson. He earned 24 caps and scored his only goal in a friendly against Italy when Iceland won a famous 2–0 victory in front of a record crowd of 20.204 at Laugardalsvöllur.
