= Ólafur Örn Bjarnason =

Icelandic footballer

Personal information
- Date of birth: 15 May 1975 (age 51)
- Place of birth: Grindavík, Iceland
- Height: 1.88 m (6 ft 2 in)
- Position: Centre-back

Team information
- Current team: AaB (Head of Coaching)

Youth career
- 1994: Grindavík

Senior career*
Years	Team	Apps	(Gls)
1992–1997	Grindavík	63	(2)
1998–2000	Malmö FF	23	(2)
2000–2003	Grindavík	72	(16)
2004–2010	Brann	151	(11)
2010–2012	Grindavík	51	(1)
2013	Fram	13	(0)

International career
1996–1997	Iceland U-21	4	(1)
1998–2007	Iceland	27	(0)

Managerial career
- 2010–2011: Grindavík (player-manager)
- 2014–2016: Fyllingsdalen
- 2017–2018: Egersund
- * Club domestic league appearances and goals as of 28 September 2013

Ólafur Örn Bjarnason (born 15 May 1975) is an Icelandic former professional footballer who played as a centre-back. He is currently the Head of Coaching at Danish Superliga side AaB.

== Club career ==
He started his career in Grindavík, and returned there after two years in Swedish club Malmö FF. In 2004, he moved from Grindavík to SK Brann in Bergen, Norway. His first season was successful, and he played every league match. In 2006, he formed one of Norway's strongest centre back duo with his countryman, Kristján Örn Sigurðsson, together named Örneredet (en: eagles nest).

He returned to Grindavík in August 2010 in a player/manager role. With 213 official matches for Brann, he's the most capped foreign player, and 11th most capped player in the club's history. Before the 2013 season he signed for Fram.

== International career ==
Ólafur has been capped 27 times for Iceland. He made his début in a friendly match in June 1998 against South Africa as a substitute for Sverrir Sverrisson.

== Coaching career ==
On 24 June 2010 returned to Grindavík and was named as their new head coach, he replaced Milan Stefán Jankovic. After the 2011 season he quit as manager, but decided nonetheless to play for them in the 2012 season. On September 9, 2013, Ólafur confirmed that he was hanging up his boots.

In early 2014, Ólafur became manager of the Norwegian club FK Fyllingsdalen. He held this position until the end of 2016, when he became manager of Egersunds IK from New Year 2017. Ólafur retired from Egersund in the summer of 2018 and shortly after got a job in the Norwegian Football Federation in the Agder region, in a role as KA Coach Development. He held this role until May 2023.

In the winter of 2023, Ólafur started working as Head of Academy at Stabæk. He left that position in July 2024 when he accepted a job as Head of Coaching at Danish club AaB.

== Honours ==
=== Norway ===
- Norwegian Premier League: 2007
- Norwegian cup: 2004
