= Bjørn Dahl (footballer, born 1954) =

Norwegian footballer and businessman

Bjørn Dahl (born 24 May 1954) is a Norwegian businessman and former footballer. From 2000 until 2010 he was managing director of his home town team SK Brann, a club he spent most of his active career playing for. He played a total of 85 leagugames, scoring ten goals between 1972 and 1983.
