= Espen Berntsen =

Norwegian football referee (born 1967)

Espen Berntsen (born 12 May 1967) is a Norwegian football referee from Vang Municipality in Hedmark county, just outside the town of Hamar. He debuted as a referee in 1990, Tippeligaen-official in 1997 and served as a FIFA official from 2002 until 2012. He is no longer included on the FIFA list as of 2013, because he reached the international retirement age of 45 in 2012. Berntsen represents Vang Fotballag and has, in addition to the domestic league, officiated in many European cup and national team matches.

Berntsen has served as a referee in international competitions, including the 2006 and 2010 World Cup qualifiers, as well as qualifying matches for Euro 2008 and Euro 2012.
