= Tommy Skjerven =

Norwegian football referee

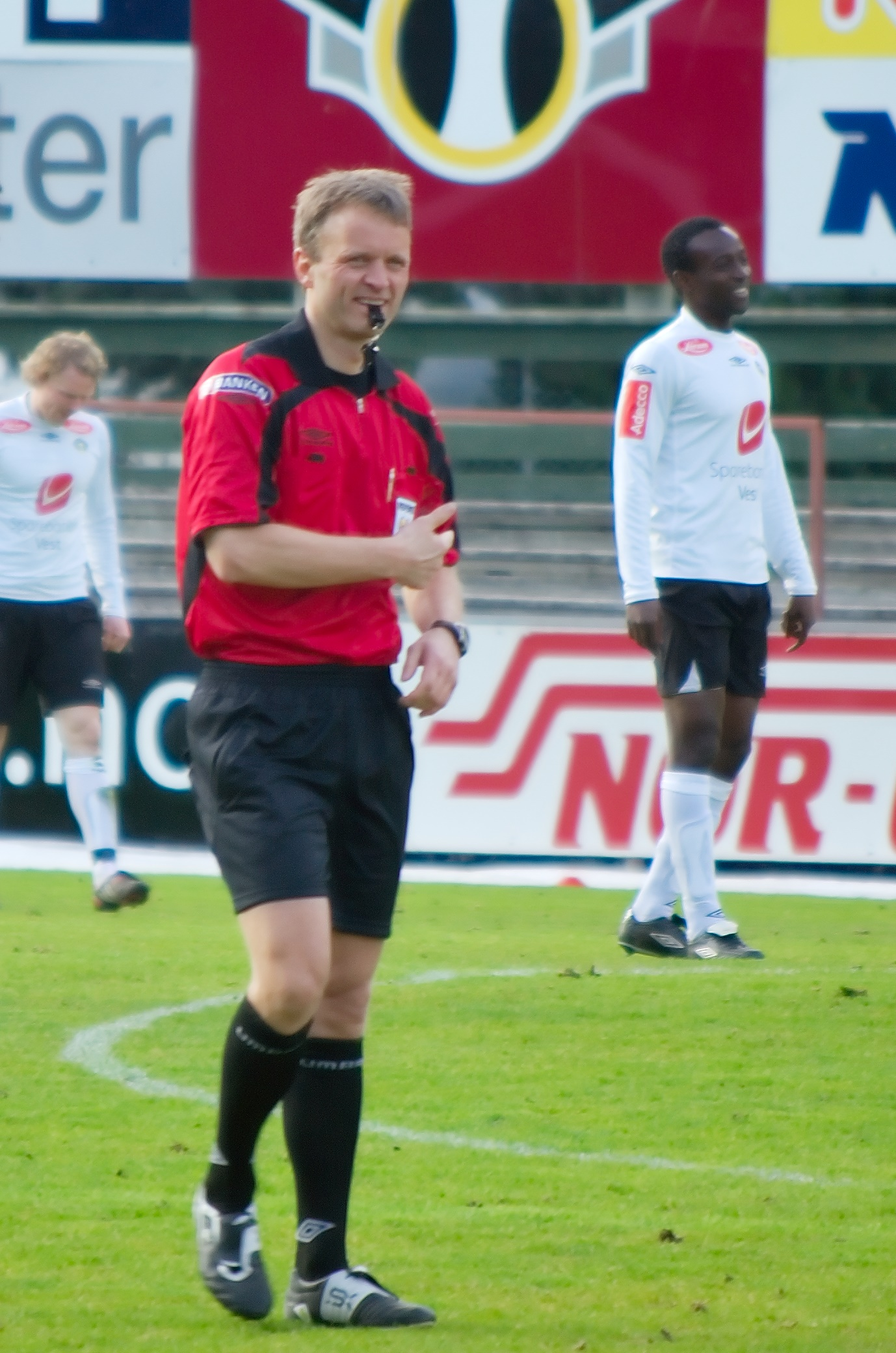
- Tommy Skjerven during a test match March 28, 2009.
- Full name: Tommy Skjerven
- Born: 25 July 1967 (age 59); Kaupanger, Norway

Domestic
Years	League	Role
1984–		Referee
1996–	Eliteserien	Referee

International
Years	League	Role
2001–2012	FIFA listed	Referee

Tommy Skjerven (born 25 July 1967) is a Norwegian football referee from Kaupanger. He debuted as a referee in 1984, and served as a FIFA referee from 2001 until 2012. He is no longer included on the FIFA list as of 2013, because he reached the international retirement age of 45 in 2012. Skjerven represents Kaupanger IL. Skjerven was the main referee in the cup final between Odd Grenland and Vålerenga in 2002. His day job is working for noreg.no in Hermansverk in Leikanger Municipality.

At international level, Skjerven officiated in competitions including qualifying matches for Euro 2008, Euro 2012, and 2010 World Cup qualifiers. He was also a referee in qualifying for the 2003 Women's World Cup, and a fourth official in qualifiers for four World Cups.
