= 2007 Tippeligaen =

63rd season of top-tier football league in Norway

Tippeligaen
- Season: 2007
- Dates: 9 April – 3 November
- Champions: Brann; 3rd title
- Relegated: Odd Grenland; Start; Sandefjord
- Champions League: Brann
- UEFA Cup: Lillestrøm; Stabæk; Viking
- Intertoto Cup: Rosenborg
- Matches: 182
- Goals: 588 (3.23 per match)
- Top goalscorer: Thorstein Helstad (22 goals)
- Biggest home win: Lillestrøm 7–0 Aalesund (26 August 2007)
- Biggest away win: Strømsgodset 0–5 Stabæk (3 November 2007)
- Highest scoring: Brann 5–2 Viking (28 October 2007); Rosenborg 4–3 Tromsø (15 April 2007); Lyn 4–3 Tromsø (28 May 2007); Lillestrøm 7–0 Aalesund (26 August 2007); Fredrikstad 4–3 Rosenborg (30 September 2007)
- Longest winning run: 5 games Brann; Stabæk
- Longest unbeaten run: 12 games Stabæk
- Longest winless run: 10 games Start; Sandefjord
- Longest losing run: 9 games Sandefjord
- Highest attendance: 21,901; Rosenborg 4–1 Start (16 May 2007)
- Lowest attendance: 3,620; Lyn 2–3 Viking (16 September 2007)
- Average attendance: 10,485 ▲15.5%

The 2007 Tippeligaen was the 63rd completed season of top division football in Norway. The season began on 9 April 2007. Originally scheduled to end on 4 November, the last round was moved to Saturday 3 November 2007, due to Rosenborg’s Champions League participation.

Brann were confirmed as league champions after the 24th round of the season, after Stabæk lost away to Viking. The result left Brann with an unassailable seven-point lead over Viking, with two games left to play. Brann thus claimed their first league title since 1963, and their third league title in all. Stabæk eventually finished as runners-up, their strongest performance ever, while Viking finished third.

Sandefjord and Start ended the season at the bottom of the table and were relegated. The play-off spot was occupied by Odd Grenland for the second year in a row. They faced Bodø/Glimt over two games for the right to play in the 2008 Tippeligaen, but lost 4–2 on aggregate and were relegated, while Bodø/Glimt were promoted.

== Teams ==
Fourteen teams competed in the league – the top twelve teams from the previous season, and two teams promoted from 1. divisjon.

Locations of the teams in 2007 Tippeligaen

Note: Table lists in alphabetical order.

Team	Ap.	Location	Stadium	Turf	Capacity
Aalesund	6	Ålesund	Color Line Stadion	Artificial	10,720
Brann	51	Bergen	Brann Stadion	Natural	17,500
Fredrikstad	38	Fredrikstad	Fredrikstad Stadion	Natural	10,500
Lillestrøm	44	Lillestrøm	Åråsen Stadion	Natural	12,000
Lyn	34	Oslo	Ullevaal Stadion	Natural	25,572
Odd Grenland	27	Skien	Odd Stadion	Artificial	8,000
Rosenborg	44	Trondheim	Lerkendal Stadion	Natural	21,166
Sandefjord	2	Sandefjord	Storstadion	Natural	7,000
Stabæk	12	Bærum	Nadderud Stadion	Natural	8,000
Start	33	Kristiansand	Sør Arena	Natural	14,563
Strømsgodset	20	Drammen	Marienlyst Stadion	Natural	8,935
Tromsø	21	Tromsø	Alfheim Stadion	Artificial	9,362
Vålerenga	47	Oslo	Ullevaal Stadion	Natural	25,572
Viking	58	Stavanger	Viking Stadion	Natural	15,350

== League table ==
Pos	Team	Pld	W	D	L	GF	GA	GD	Pts	Qualification or relegation
1	Brann (C)	26	17	3	6	59	39	+20	54	Qualification for the Champions League second qualifying round
2	Stabæk	26	14	6	6	53	35	+18	48	Qualification for the UEFA Cup second qualifying round
3	Viking	26	14	5	7	50	40	+10	47	Qualification for the UEFA Cup first qualifying round
4	Lillestrøm	26	12	8	6	47	28	+19	44	Qualification for the UEFA Cup second qualifying round (Note: Lillestrøm qualified for the UEFA Cup second qualifying round by winning the Norwegian Cup. Their spot in the Intertoto Cup was passed down to Rosenborg, the first team in the table not already qualified for any European competition.)
5	Rosenborg	26	12	5	9	53	39	+14	41	Qualification for the Intertoto Cup second round
6	Tromsø	26	12	4	10	45	44	+1	40	
7	Vålerenga	26	10	6	10	34	34	0	36	
8	Fredrikstad	26	9	9	8	37	40	−3	36	
9	Lyn	26	10	4	12	43	46	−3	34	
10	Strømsgodset	26	8	6	12	34	47	−13	30	
11	Aalesund	26	9	3	14	40	56	−16	30	
12	Odd Grenland (R)	26	8	3	15	33	43	−10	27	Qualification for the relegation play-offs
13	Start (R)	26	6	8	12	34	44	−10	26	Relegation to First Division
14	Sandefjord (R)	26	4	4	18	26	53	−27	16	Relegation to First Division

Source: fotball.no
Rules for classification: 1) points; 2) goal difference; 3) number of goals scored.
(C) Champions; (R) Relegated

== Relegation play-offs ==
8 November 2007
19:00 CET (UTC+1)

Odd Grenland	0–1	Bodø/Glimt
	Report	Martins 12'

Skagerak Arena, Skien
Attendance: 9,183
Referee: Brage Sandmoen

12 November 2007
19:00 CET (UTC+1)

Bodø/Glimt	3–2	Odd Grenland
Olsen 3', 27'; Berg 69'	Report	Toresen 42'; Martins 72' (o.g.)

Aspmyra Stadion, Bodø
Attendance: 6,364
Referee: Tommy Skjerven

Bodø/Glimt won 4–2 on aggregate and were promoted to the 2008 Tippeligaen.

== Results ==
Home \ Away	AAL	SKB	FFK	LSK	LYN	OG	RBK	SF	STB	IKS	SIF	TIL	VIF	VIK
Aalesund	—	2–1	3–3	1–3	3–1	2–1	1–2	4–1	1–4	2–4	3–2	2–3	1–0	0–2
Brann	2–1	—	2–2	3–1	3–1	4–0	3–2	1–0	3–0	2–2	3–1	2–1	4–1	5–2
Fredrikstad	2–1	0–4	—	0–0	3–1	1–1	4–3	2–0	1–2	3–0	1–1	2–1	1–0	2–0
Lillestrøm	7–0	1–5	3–0	—	3–1	1–1	4–1	1–1	1–1	1–0	2–0	0–3	0–1	4–1
Lyn	0–0	6–0	0–0	0–4	—	3–1	2–1	3–0	3–2	4–1	1–0	4–3	3–1	2–3
Odd Grenland	3–0	0–2	2–0	0–1	2–0	—	1–2	4–0	1–5	2–0	0–1	0–1	1–4	1–3
Rosenborg	2–2	3–0	1–1	1–1	3–0	4–1	—	2–0	3–0	4–1	1–2	4–3	2–0	4–2
Sandefjord	3–0	2–3	2–2	0–2	3–1	0–2	1–2	—	2–3	1–3	0–1	2–1	1–3	4–1
Stabæk	4–2	0–1	0–2	3–1	3–2	1–0	2–1	1–1	—	1–1	3–2	5–0	2–2	2–1
Start	1–2	1–1	3–1	0–0	0–1	1–2	2–1	3–1	1–1	—	2–3	1–1	1–0	1–1
Strømsgodset	0–4	2–4	2–1	1–1	1–1	2–1	1–1	4–0	0–5	3–2	—	1–2	1–2	1–2
Tromsø	0–2	3–0	4–1	2–1	2–1	2–4	2–1	2–1	0–1	1–1	2–2	—	1–0	2–1
Vålerenga	2–1	2–0	2–0	1–3	0–0	1–1	2–1	2–0	1–1	3–2	1–1	2–2	—	1–3
Viking	3–0	3–1	2–2	1–1	4–2	2–1	1–1	0–0	2–1	2–0	3–0	3–1	2–1	—

Source: NIFS (in Norwegian)
Legend: Blue = home team win; Yellow = draw; Red = away team win.

== Season statistics ==
=== Top scorers ===
Rank	Scorer	Club	Goals
1	(Norway) Thorstein Helstad	Brann	22
2	(Sweden) Daniel Nannskog	Stabæk	19
3	(Nigeria) Peter Ijeh	Viking	18
4	(Iceland) Veigar Páll Gunnarsson	Stabæk	15
5	(Norway) Steffen Iversen	Rosenborg	13
6	(Norway) Morten Moldskred	Tromsø	12
6	(Canada) Olivier Occean	Lillestrøm	12
8	(Norway) Arild Sundgot	Lillestrøm	10
9	(Norway) Morten Berre	Vålerenga	9
9	(Norway) Tarik Elyounoussi	Fredrikstad	9
9	(Burkina Faso) Yssouf Koné	Rosenborg	9

Source: VG Nett

=== Discipline ===
==== Player ====
- Most yellow cards: 7
  - (Norway) Lars Iver Strand (Tromsø)
- Most red cards: 3
  - (Norway) Frode Kippe (Lillestrøm)

==== Club ====
- Most yellow cards: 53
  - Sandefjord
- Most red cards: 6
  - Lillestrøm

=== Attendances ===
Team	Stadium	Capacity	Total	Average	% of Capacity
Lyn	Ullevaal Stadion	25,572	99,614	7,663	30.0
Vålerenga	Ullevaal Stadion	25,572	179,869	13,836	54.1
Rosenborg	Lerkendal stadion	21,166	258,741	19,903	94.0
Brann	Brann stadion	17,824	225,033	17,310	97.1
Viking	Viking Stadion	16,600	205,999	15,846	95.5
Start	Sør Arena	14,563	145,812	11,216	77.0
Fredrikstad	Fredrikstad stadion	12,800	153,370	11,798	92.2
Lillestrøm	Åråsen stadion	11,637	117,229	9,018	77.5
Aalesund	Color Line Stadion	10,720	136,178	10,475	97.7
Odd Grenland	Skagerak Arena	8,930	75,294	5,792	64.9
Sandefjord	Komplett.no Arena	8,743	79,270	6,098	69.7
Strømsgodset	Marienlyst stadion	8,500	88,496	6,807	80.0
Tromsø	Alfheim stadion	8,159	78,686	6,053	74.2
Stabæk	Nadderud stadion	6,550	72,410	5,570	85.0

Total	Games	Average
1,916,001	182	10,528

Source: VG Nett
