= Løv-Ham Fotball =

Norwegian football club

Løv-Ham
- Full name: Løv-Ham Fotball
- Nickname: Løvene (The lions)
- Founded: 29 December 1975
- Ground: Fyllingsdalen Stadion; Bergen
- Capacity: 1,000
| Home colours | Away colours |

Løv-Ham Fotball was a football club from Fyllingsdalen in Bergen, Norway. Its origins are two local sports teams in Fyllingsdalen called Løvåsen and Hamre. On 29 December 1975 those clubs were merged, choosing the name Løv-Ham. In March 1999 Løv-Ham was divided into a football division, Løv-Ham Fotball, and a handball division, Løv-Ham Håndball.

Løv-Ham is most notable as a football club, with more than 600 members. The senior football team played in 1. divisjon, the second tier of Norwegian football from 2005 until 2011 1. divisjon. After the 2011 season, Løv-Ham merged with Fyllingen to create FK Fyllingsdalen, and for a period the club only existed at a junior level. The club later started playing senior football again, and is currently playing in the sixth tier of Norwegian football.

== History ==
The club was founded on 29 December 1975, as a merger between Løvåsen and Hamregården. From 1989 till 2004 the club was playing on the third and fourth tier of Norwegian football. In 2004, the club was promoted to 1. divisjon, after winning their 2. divisjon group. The club struggled against relegation throughout their stint in 1. divisjon, but despite being a low-budget club, Løv-Ham was somewhat stabilised as a second-tier club. In the 2010 season, Løv-Ham finished in 4th place and advanced to the promotion play-offs. They lost 0–2 away in the semifinal against Fredrikstad FK. Promotion to the top flight was not a goal for Løv-Ham, their goal was to develop talents in the Bergen region.

=== Merger with Fyllingen ===
Løv-Ham had in the recent years taken over Fyllingen's spot as Fyllingsdalen's best football-club, but it was still Fyllingen that had the biggest support and the financial power in the borough. In the end of 2007, the two clubs started negotiation to merge the football-departments of the two clubs. If this had been a reality the goal was a budget of at least 15 million, a doubling compared to the Løv-Ham's budget in 2007. The aim was to create an organization and a name that create a stable state football team, and which in time also be able to play up in the Premier League. The experiment stranded when it was not achieved sufficient majority at the extraordinary annual meeting of Fyllingen. Four years later, on 28 September 2011, the members of both clubs' voted yes to a merge. The new club, FK Fyllingsdalen, replaced Løv-Ham in the 2012 Norwegian Second Division, and the two old clubs ceased to exist. Kjetil Knutsen became head coach of the new team.

== Recent history ==
| Season | | Pos. | Pl. | W | D | L | GS | GA | P | Cup | Notes |
|---|---|---|---|---|---|---|---|---|---|---|---|
| 2001 | 2. divisjon, section 2 | 5 | 26 | 14 | 1 | 11 | 59 | 36 | 43 | 3rd round | |
| 2002 | 2. divisjon, section 3 | 2 | 26 | 18 | 5 | 3 | 62 | 28 | 59 | 1st round | |
| 2003 | 2. divisjon, section 3 | 2 | 26 | 18 | 2 | 6 | 69 | 30 | 56 | 2nd round | |
| 2004 | 2. divisjon, section 3 | ↑ 1 | 26 | 22 | 3 | 1 | 87 | 27 | 69 | 2nd round | Promoted to 1. divisjon |
| 2005 | 1. divisjon | 12 | 30 | 9 | 4 | 17 | 31 | 47 | 31 | 3rd round | |
| 2006 | 1. divisjon | 11 | 30 | 8 | 11 | 11 | 38 | 40 | 35 | 3rd round | |
| 2007 | 1. divisjon | 12 | 30 | 9 | 6 | 15 | 39 | 44 | 33 | 3rd round | |
| 2008 | 1. divisjon | 12 | 30 | 9 | 7 | 14 | 37 | 45 | 34 | Final 16 | |
| 2009 | 1. divisjon | 10 | 30 | 11 | 7 | 12 | 44 | 50 | 40 | Final 16 | |
| 2010 | 1. divisjon | 4 | 28 | 13 | 4 | 11 | 46 | 38 | 43 | Final 16 | Lost playoffs for promotion |
| 2011 | 1. divisjon | ↓ 16 | 30 | 4 | 5 | 21 | 32 | 71 | 16 | 2nd round | Relegated to 2. divisjon |
