= Sigurd Rushfeldt =

Norwegian footballer (born 1972)

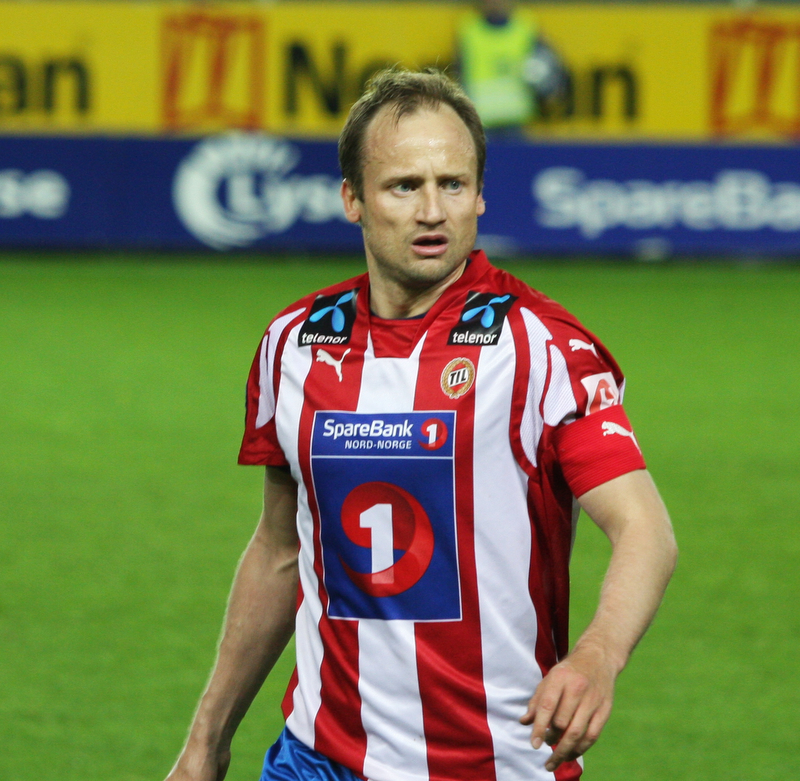
- Rushfeldt with Tromsø in 2008

Personal information
- Full name: Sigurd Rushfeldt
- Date of birth: 11 December 1972 (age 53)
- Place of birth: Vadsø, Norway
- Height: 1.87 m (6 ft 2 in)
- Position: Striker

Youth career
- Vadsø Turn
- Norild

Senior career*
Years	Team	Apps	(Gls)
1992–1996	Tromsø	75	(34)
1995	→ Birmingham City (loan)	7	(0)
1996–1999	Rosenborg	66	(67)
1999–2002	Racing Santander	42	(5)
2001	→ Rosenborg (loan)	10	(6)
2001–2006	Austria Wien	137	(69)
2006–2011	Tromsø	126	(50)
Total		485	(246)

International career
	Norway U-21	2	(0)
1994–2007	Norway	38	(7)

Managerial career
- 2013–2018: Tromsø (assistant)
- * Club domestic league appearances and goals

Sigurd Rushfeldt (born 11 December 1972) is a Norwegian football coach and former player who works as an assistant coach for Tromsø. During his playing career, he played for Tromsø, Birmingham City, Rosenborg, Racing de Santander, and Austria Wien. As a forward, he is well known for his strength and for being a prolific goalscorer. Rushfeldt is the all-time top goal scorer of Eliteserien.

Rushfeldt scored 246 league goals in his career, including a record 172 in Eliteserien.

== Club career ==
=== Early career and Tromsø ===
Rushfeldt was born in Vadsø, where he started his career in Vadsø Turn and Norild. He was noticed by Tromsø, which signed him in 1992. As a prolific goalscorer, he sparked interest in other clubs. In 1995 he was loaned to Birmingham but scored just once in the League Cup against Tranmere Rovers. It was not until the end of the 1996 season that Rushfeldt would move on. He then signed for Rosenborg, but not before playing in the cup final that would be Rushfeldt's last match for Tromsø in his first spell with the club. Rushfeldt scored Tromsø's second goal in the cup final securing a 2–1 win over rivals Bodø/Glimt.

=== Rosenborg and move abroad ===
With Rosenborg, Rushfeldt had great success. He won the Norwegian Premier League 4 times, he won the cup once more and also became topscorer of the Norwegian Premier League twice. The last time he won the Norwegian Premier League with Rosenborg in 2001, he was loaned in from Racing de Santander which he had transferred to in 1999. His spell with Santander was not a great success and in 2001 Rushfeldt moved on again, this time to Austria Wien. In Vienna he had success and won the league with Austria in 2003 and 2006 and was voted player of the year in the Austrian league 2004/2005. In 2003, 2005 and 2006 he also won the cup with Austria Wien. He scored 3 goals in these finals.

=== Return to Tromsø ===
He returned to Tromsø, which he had left in 1996, in July 2006. When his contract with Austria Wien was nearing an end Rushfeldt declared that he wanted to end his career in Norway. Several Norwegian clubs were interested in signing him. He chose to return to Tromsø declaring that he felt drawn to the north, and that he wanted to follow his heart and therefore it had to be Tromsø. In Tromsø, he was again paired up in front with former team-mate Ole Martin Årst, who also played in the 1996 cup final and had enjoyed a career as a professional player outside of Norway before he returned to Tromsø some years earlier. This partnership ended in July 2007, when Årst was sold. Rushfeldt has built up a new partnership upfront with Morten Moldskred. In November 2007 Rushfeldt was selected to be in the Norwegian Premier league team of the year by a group of Norwegian newspapers, stating that he is invaluable as a target man.

Rushfeldt signed a new contract with Tromsø before the 2009 season, a one-year extension that would see him take on the role of coach as well. He came off to a good start, scoring 5 goals in 4 appearances, including a brace away against SK Brann, a match that Tromsø went on to win 4–2.

Rushfeldt became the all-time top scorer of the Norwegian Tippeligaen on 29 May 2011, the day 19 years after his first goal there. In a home match against SK Brann he scored in the first half, equaling Harald Brattbakk's record 166 goals. In the second half, he scored two more goals, completing a perfect hat-trick.

Rushfeldt's last appearance as a professional football player came against IK Start in 2011. He helped his team to finishing runner-up in the league, equalling Tromsø's best ever season, 1990, when they also finished runners-up.

Rushfeldt was given a testimonial match which was played at Alfheim Stadion on 2 June 2012. The match was played between two teams mostly made up of players he had played with during his career at Tromsø, Rosenborg. and Austria Wien, divided into a "Tromsø All Stars" and a "Rosenborg All Stars" team. Rushfeldt played the first half for Tromsø and most of the second half for Rosenborg, scoring once for each team. The match ended in a 6–4 victory for the Rosenborg team.

=== Comeback with Lyngen/Karnes ===
In May 2014, Rushfeldt announced that he would play for Lyngen/Karnes IL in the Norwegian fourth division (level 5 on the Norwegian football pyramid). In his debut for his new club, he scored twice. Rushfeldt will continue living in Tromsø and occasionally play for Lyngen/Karnes (in neighboring Lyngen Municipality) when his schedule permits it.

== International career ==
In 1994, he surprisingly got a place in Egil Olsen's squad for the 1994 World Cup in USA playing in one game, but Rushfeldt never established himself as a regular having only won a total of 7 caps by 2001, and he did not score his first goal until 2002 in a game against Japan. In 2006, he announced his decision to retire from the national team. However, in 2007 he reconsidered his decision and agreed with the national team coach Åge Hareide that he would make himself available for the game against Bosnia because John Carew was unavailable due to injury. He came on as a substitute in the game against Bosnia, making his first national team appearance in 2 years. Norway failed to qualify for the European Championship and he retired for good from the national team. He ended his international career playing 38 games scoring 7 goals.

== Coaching career ==
In October 2013, Rushfeldt was appointed the assistant coach of Tromsø, after Steinar Nilsen replaced Agnar Christensen as head coach of the club.

== Career statistics ==
=== Club ===
Appearances and goals by club, season and competition
Club	Season	League			Cup		Continental		Total	
Club	Season	Division	Apps	Goals	Apps	Goals	Apps	Goals	Apps	Goals
Tromsø	1992	Tippeligaen	16	4	6	2	0	0	22	6
Tromsø	1993	Tippeligaen	21	9	5	5	0	0	26	14
Tromsø	1994	Tippeligaen	22	13	4	8	0	0	26	21
Tromsø	1995	Tippeligaen	16	8	3	2	1	0	20	10
Tromsø	Total		75	34	18	17	1	0	94	51
Birmingham (loan)	1995–96	First Division	7	0	1	1	0	0	8	1
Tromsø	1996	Tippeligaen	22	15	8	12	0	0	30	27
Rosenborg	1997	Tippeligaen	25	25	5	3	3	1	33	29
Rosenborg	1998	Tippeligaen	26	27	3	5	2	0	31	32
Rosenborg	1999	Tippeligaen	15	15	4	4	0	0	19	19
Rosenborg	Total		66	67	12	12	5	1	83	80
Racing Santander	1999–2000	La Liga	24	2	1	0	0	0	25	2
Racing Santander	2000–01	La Liga	18	3	0	0	0	0	18	3
Racing Santander	Total		42	5	1	0	0	0	43	5
Rosenborg (loan)	2001	Tippeligaen	10	6	0	0	7	2	17	8
Austria Wien	2001–02	A-Bundesliga	16	11	3	2	0	0	19	13
Austria Wien	2002–03	A-Bundesliga	25	5	4	2	1	0	30	7
Austria Wien	2003–04	A-Bundesliga	33	25	3	2	0	0	36	27
Austria Wien	2004–05	A-Bundesliga	30	19	1	1	0	0	31	20
Austria Wien	2005–06	A-Bundesliga	33	9	3	2	0	0	36	11
Austria Wien	Total		137	69	14	9	1	0	152	78
Tromsø	2006	Tippeligaen	13	7	1	1	0	0	14	8
Tromsø	2007	Tippeligaen	21	8	2	3	0	0	23	11
Tromsø	2008	Tippeligaen	22	8	3	3	0	0	25	11
Tromsø	2009	Tippeligaen	25	9	3	3	6	4	34	16
Tromsø	2010	Tippeligaen	20	8	1	1	0	0	21	9
Tromsø	2011	Tippeligaen	25	10	2	0	0	0	27	10
Tromsø	Total		126	50	12	11	6	4	144	65
Career total			485	246	66	62	20	7	571	316

=== International goals ===
Scores and results list Norway's goal tally first, score column indicates score after each Rushfeldt goal.

List of international goals scored by Sigurd Rushfeldt
No.	Date	Venue	Opponent	Score	Result	Competition
1	14 May 2002	Ullevaal Stadion, Oslo, Norway	Japan	2–0	3–0	Friendly
2	28 January 2003	Bausher, Muscat, Oman	Oman	2–1	2–0	Friendly
3	2 April 2003	Stade Josy Barthel, Luxembourg City, Luxembourg	Luxembourg	1–0	2–0	UEFA Euro 2004 qualifying
4	28 April 2004	Ullevaal Stadion, Oslo, Norway	Russia	2–0	3–2	Friendly
5	9 February 2005	Ta' Qali Stadium, Attard, Malta	Malta	1–0	3–0	Friendly
6	9 February 2005	Ta' Qali Stadium, Attard, Malta	Malta	2–0	3–0	Friendly
7	8 October 2005	Ullevaal Stadion, Oslo, Norway	Moldova	1–0	1–0	2006 FIFA World Cup qualification

== Honours ==
Tromsø

- Norwegian Cup: 1996

Rosenborg

- Tippeligaen: 1997, 1998, 1999
- Norwegian Cup: 1999

Austria Wien

- Austrian Bundesliga: 2002–03, 2005–06
- Austrian Cup: 2002–03, 2004–05, 2005–06

Individual

- Tippeligaen top scorer: 1997, 1998
- Knicksen Striker of the Year: 1998
- Austria Wien Player of the Season: 2003–04
- Kniksen's Honour Award: 2011

Record

- Tippeligaen all-time top scorer: 172 goals
