= Miika Koppinen =

Finnish footballer and coach (born 1978)

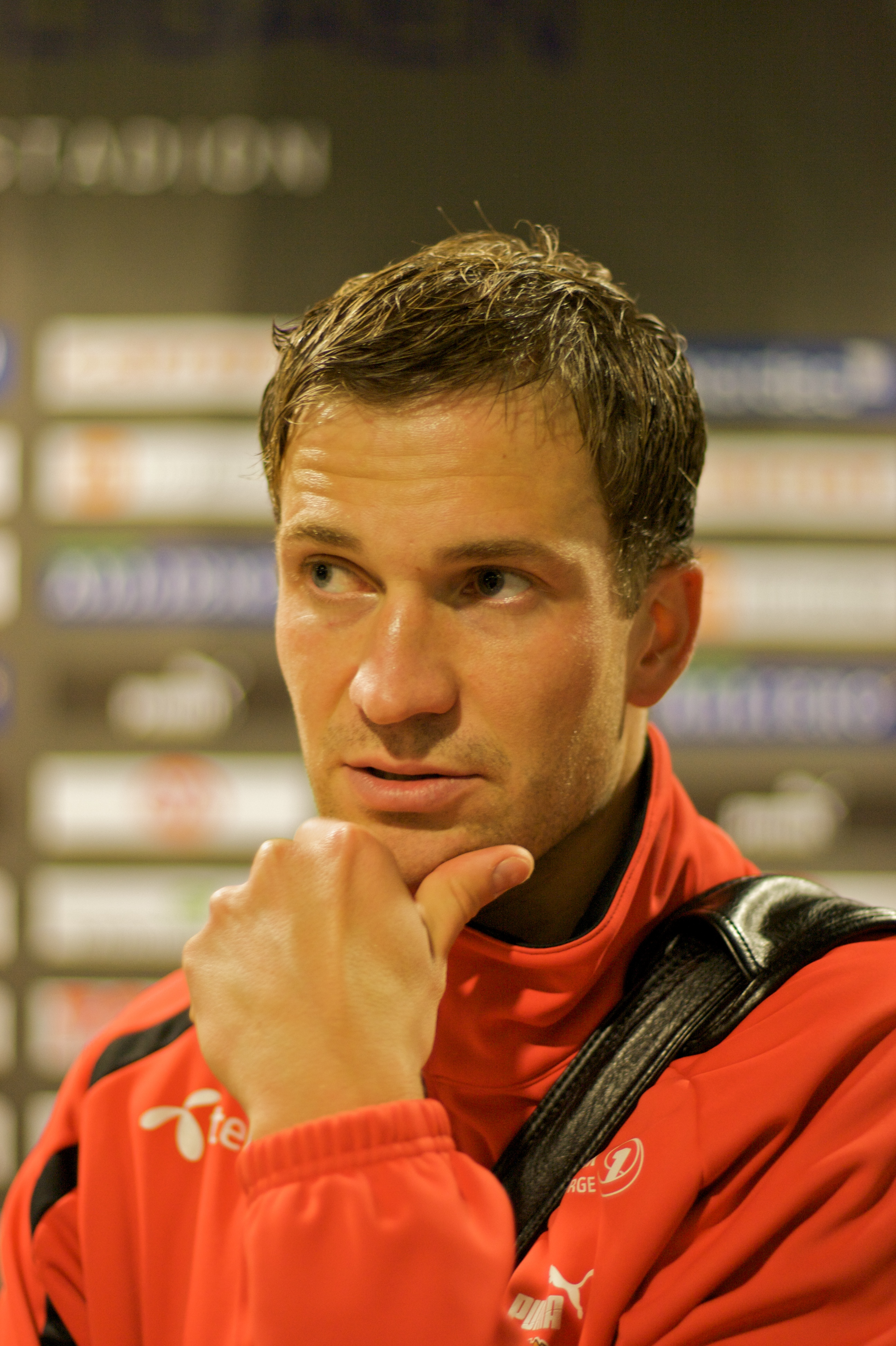
- Koppinen in 2009

Personal information
- Full name: Miika Johannes Koppinen
- Date of birth: 5 July 1978 (age 48)
- Place of birth: Kokkola, Finland
- Height: 1.90 m (6 ft 3 in)
- Position: Centre-back

Youth career
- KPV

Senior career*
Years	Team	Apps	(Gls)
1997–1998	KPV	19	(2)
1999	Jaro	26	(5)
2000–2004	Tromsø	121	(4)
2005–2007	Rosenborg	41	(5)
2008–2014	Tromsø	154	(9)

International career
	Finland U21	8	(0)
2000–2006	Finland	18	(0)

Managerial career
- 2015–: Finnsnes IL (assistant)
Medal record
FF Jaro
Runner-up	Finnish Cup	1999
Rosenborg BK
Winner	Tippeligaen	2006
Tromsø IL
Runner-up	Tippeligaen	2011
- * Club domestic league appearances and goals as of 8 February 2015

Miika Johannes Koppinen (born 5 July 1978) is a Finnish football coach and former international player who is currently an assistant coach at Finnsnes IL. Koppinen played professional football as a central defender from 1998 to 2014. He started his career in Finland before moving to Norway to play for Tromsø IL and Rosenborg BK. Koppinen won 18 caps for the Finland national football team and made 337 appearances for Tromsø, the third-highest number of appearances by any player for the club.

== Club career ==
=== Early years ===
He first played youth football for KPS (Kokkolan Palloseura) before moving on to KPV in his home town of Kokkola. He made his debut for KPV in 1998 at 19 years of age, before moving to second division side FF Jaro in 1999. The club managed to reach the final of the Suomen Cup, before losing 2–1 to FC Jokerit.

=== Move to Norway ===
He joined Norwegian side Tromsø in 2000. Tromsø got fourth place in his first season, but a disappointing second season saw Tromsø relegated to the Norwegian first division. Tromsø responded quickly though and got back to the top-flight after one season. Two more seasons followed at Tromsø before securing a move to Rosenborg on a free transfer.

=== Rosenborg ===
At his first season at Rosenborg, Koppinen found himself injured for much of the season which limited his Premier Division appearances to only six games. He got himself back at the end of the season, also playing for his side during the group stages of the Champions League. A disappointing season saw Rosenborg in seventh place, the worst league position for decades.

In 2006 Koppinen helped Rosenborg win the Premier League, playing sixteen games. In the penultimate match of the 2006 Norwegian Premier League, Koppinen notably set up Rosenborg's deciding third goal against Viking by grabbing Viking's goalkeeper Mattias Asper's elbow, causing him to drop the ball. At the time, it seemed likely that the goal would lead to relegation for Viking. In post-match interviews, Koppinen initially denied any wrongdoing, but two days later he called Viking's director Egil Østenstad and asked for forgiveness, citing it was the Rosenborg way and he did not like it. Because of this, he is regarded as an unfair player and his name is associated with lack of sportsmanship in the same way Quisling is with treason.

The following season in 2007 was yet another difficult season for his side, which resulted in only a fifth-place finish. On 18 September 2007 he scored for Rosenborg in a Champions League game at Stamford Bridge in a shock 1–1 draw against Chelsea F.C. This proved to be the last game during José Mourinho's Chelsea reign.

=== Return to Tromsø ===
In 2008, he moved back to Tromsø IL, and became vice-captain and later club captain. Koppinen helped his side to third places in the league in 2008 and 2010, and a second place in 2011. After suffering relegation in 2013, his last season helped the club win promotion before he at the end of the 2014 season retired as a player. Koppinen stated that the decision to retire was taken for medical reasons hampering his ability to train and perform.

== International career ==
He has played eight times for the Finnish U21 team. In 2000, he made his debut for the full national side in a game against Norway.

He played a total of eighteen games for Finland before stepping down in 2006, citing personal reasons. However four years later, in October 2010, he was called back to the national team to play a UEFA Euro 2012 qualifying match against Hungary, but in the end he did not belong to the final squad because of an injury.

== Coaching career ==
In January 2015 Koppinen joined Finnsnes IL as assistant coach to Bjørn Johansen, a former teammate from Tromsø.

== Personal life ==
He is married to a woman from Tromsø and has two children. He is fluent in Norwegian.

== Career statistics ==
=== Club ===
As of 1 September 2024.

Appearances and goals by club, season and competition
Club	Season	League			Cup (Note: Includes Suomen Cup and Norwegian Cup)		Europe		Total	
Club	Season	Division	Apps	Goals	Apps	Goals	Apps	Goals	Apps	Goals
KPV	1997	Kakkonen	0	0	0	0	–		0	0
KPV	1998	Ykkönen	19	2	0	0	–		19	2
KPV	Total		19	2	0	0	0	0	19	2
Jaro	1999	Ykkönen	26	5	0	0	–		26	5
Tromsø	2000	Tippeligaen	22	0	0	0	–		22	0
Tromsø	2001	Tippeligaen	25	2	3	0	–		28	2
Tromsø	2002	1. divisjon	25	1	4	1	–		29	2
Tromsø	2003	Tippeligaen	24	0	5	0	–		29	0
Tromsø	2004	Tippeligaen	25	1	4	0	–		29	1
Tromsø	Total		121	4	16	1	0	0	137	5
Rosenborg	2005	Tippeligaen	7	0	3	0	1 (Note: Appearance(s) in UEFA Cup)	0	11	0
Rosenborg	2006	Tippeligaen	16	1	0	0	–		16	1
Rosenborg	2007	Tippeligaen	19	5	0	0	6 (Note: Appearances in UEFA Champions League)	2	25	7
Rosenborg	Total		42	6	3	0	7	2	52	8
Tromsø	2008	Tippeligaen	20	2	0	0	–		20	2
Tromsø	2009	Tippeligaen	23	2	0	0	5 (Note: Appearances in UEFA Europa League)	0	28	2
Tromsø	2010	Tippeligaen	27	2	1	0	–		28	2
Tromsø	2011	Tippeligaen	22	1	0	0	–		22	1
Tromsø	2012	Tippeligaen	19	1	4	0	6	1	29	2
Tromsø	2013	Tippeligaen	23	1	2	0	9	1	34	2
Tromsø	2014	1. divisjon	22	0	0	0	2	0	24	0
Tromsø	Total		156	9	7	0	22	2	185	11
Tromsø 2	2012	2. divisjon	1	0	–		–		1	0
Career total			365	26	26	1	29	4	420	31

=== International ===
Finland national team
Year	Apps	Goals
2000	2	0
2001	4	0
2002	3	0
2003	4	0
2004	4	0
2005	0	0
2006	1	0
Total	18	0

== Honours ==
Rosenborg

- Tippeligaen: 2006
