= 2013 Tippeligaen =

69th season of top-tier football league in Norway

Tippeligaen
- Season: 2013
- Dates: 15 March – 10 November
- Champions: Strømsgodset; 2nd title
- Relegated: Tromsø; Hønefoss
- Champions League: Strømsgodset
- Europa League: Rosenborg; Haugesund; Molde (via domestic cup)
- Matches: 240
- Goals: 694 (2.89 per match)
- Top goalscorer: Frode Johnsen (16 goals)
- Biggest home win: Start 7–0 Sandnes Ulf (1 September 2013)
- Biggest away win: Start 0–6 Strømsgodset (20 May 2013)
- Highest scoring: Aalesund 7–1 Lillestrøm (13 May 2013); Vålerenga 5–3 Sarpsborg 08 (29 July 2013)
- Longest winning run: 4 games Haugesund; Rosenborg; Start; Strømsgodset; Aalesund
- Longest unbeaten run: 16 games Rosenborg
- Longest winless run: 9 games Hønefoss; Tromsø
- Longest losing run: 8 games Sarpsborg 08
- Highest attendance: 20,188; Rosenborg 0–0 Molde (20 May 2013)
- Lowest attendance: 2,183; Hønefoss 0–1 Sandnes Ulf (18 August 2013)
- Average attendance: 6,829 ▼2.5%

The 2013 Tippeligaen was the 69th completed season of top division football in Norway. The competition began 15 March 2013 and ended on 10 November 2013, when Strømsgodset defeated Haugesund 4–0 to win their second league title.

The league was contested by 16 teams: The best 13 teams of the 2012 season, Start and Sarpsborg 08 who won promotion from the 2012 1. divisjon and Sandnes Ulf who retained their spot in the top league after beating the 1. divisjon side Ullensaker/Kisa in the relegation play-off.

Molde who won Tippeligaen the previous season failed to defend the championship and ended on sixth place. Strømsgodset who won silver in 2012, won their first league championship in 43 years, finishing one point ahead of title contenders Rosenborg. Haugesund won bronze for the first time in the history, while Tromsø and Hønefoss were relegated to the 2014 1. divisjon.

== Background ==
Molde, Strømsgodset and Rosenborg were involved in the title race in the 2012 season. After Rosenborg lost against the other title contenders Molde and Strømsgodset in the 27th and the 28th round respectively, Molde secured their second straight Tippeligaen title with one match left to play when Strømsgodset lost against Sandnes Ulf. Fredrikstad and Stabæk were relegated after finishing 15th and 16th respectively, while Sandnes Ulf had to play a relegation play-off against the 1. divisjon side Ullensaker/Kisa, which they won 7–1 on aggregate.

After the 2012 season, Rosenborg's head coach Jan Jönsson was fired from his position, and was replaced by the head coach of the successful Norwegian under-21 team, Per Joar Hansen. Jönsson was soon appointed as head coach of Aalesund, as a replacement for Kjetil Rekdal who had also been fired. Rekdal returned to his old club Vålerenga, which he won the league with in 2005. Martin Andresen had announced in October 2012 that he would leave his position as manager of Vålerenga after the season., In addition Per-Mathias Høgmo left Tromsø after his contract expired, and they appointed Agnar Christensen as the new head coach.

== Season summary ==
Ahead of each Tippeligaen season, the newspapers in Norway predict how the season is going to end. In 2013, all of the major newspapers predicted that either Molde or Rosenborg would win the league. The opening match of the 2013 season was played between Viking and the defending champions Molde in Stavanger. Viking won the match 2–1 after a match-winning goal by Trond Olsen. Molde became the first defending champion in Norway to lose the first four matches of the season, with their manager Ole Gunnar Solskjær stating that the club wouldn't be able to defend the title. After collecting two points in the first seven matches, Molde won their first match 4–1 against local rivals Aalesund. Aalesund had an impressing season opener, by winning four of the first four matches, and after the loss against Molde they won 7–1 against Lillestrøm with Abderrazak Hamdallah scoring a hat-trick, and was positioned second after nine matches.

With Molde out of the race for the title, it looked as though it was going to be a fight between Strømsgodset and Rosenborg. Aalesund were, however, only five points behind the leaders Rosenborg, after they won three consecutive matches away from home, and with 10 matches left to play the players started to talk about winning the league. After Aalesund lost three matches in a row, the team was too far behind the top two teams, and three points behind Viking in third place. Aalesund went seven matches without winning, but with a record-high number of points the club finished the season in fourth place.

Tromsø, who finished fourth and lost the Norwegian Cup Final in the previous season, were the only Norwegian team to qualify for the 2013–14 UEFA Europa League group stage, but their form in the league after the summer break was declining, and they soon found themselves fighting against relegation. The team did however manage to put an end to Rosenborg's streak of 16 matches without losing, when Tromsø won 1–0 at home. After the loss at home against Start in the 25th round, Tromsø had collected six points in the last 12 matches and the club fired the head coach Agnar Christensen and replaced him with Steinar Nilsen, who had saved the team from relegation in 2005 and 2006.

For the first time since the 2005 season, the championship was determined in the decisive match of the season. Strømsgodset were leading the league one point ahead of Rosenborg, and could secure the championship in the home-match against bronze-winners Haugesund. At the same time, six teams were not safe from relegation with one match left to play; the three teams Sarpsborg 08, Tromsø and Hønefoss were fighting to avoid the two direct relegation spots, while Vålerenga, Sogndal and Sandnes Ulf could still be forced to play a relegation play-off against a 1. divisjon side if they finished 14th in the league. Rosenborg was leading 2–0 at half-time against Lillestrøm, and Strømsgodset needed to score a goal in their match against Haugesund to secure the title. Ola Kamara sent Strømsgodset up in a 1–0 lead, and after Stefan Johansen and Øyvind Storflor scored one goal each and Ola Kamara scored his second goal in the game, Strømsgodset won the match 4–0 and secured their first championship since the 1970 season. Tromsø had to win the match away against Brann, who had nothing to play for in the last round, to avoid relegation but Tromsø had not won a single match away from home during the season, and also lost the last match 4–1, and were relegated to the 1. divisjon after an 11-year-long spell in the top flight. Hønefoss also had to win their last match to avoid relegation, and were leading the match against Odd, but Frode Johnsen scored the match-winning goal and Odd won 3–2. Sarpborg 08 lost the last match 2–1 against Viking, despite leading when the stoppage time began, and finished 14th in the league, and a met the 1. divisjon side Ranheim in the relegation play-off They won 1–0 at home and 2–0 in the awaygame and play in the next seasons Tippeligaen.

Johnsen's goal against Hønefoss was his sixteenth overall this season, and he became top goalscorer with one more goal than Aalesund's Hamdallah. Aged 38, Johnsen is the oldest-ever top goalscorer in the Norwegian top flight. Johnsen also won the Kniksen Award for the "forward of the year". Players from Strømsgodset won four of the five Kniksen Award prices as Adam Larsen Kwarasey won the goalkeeper of the year, Lars Christopher Vilsvik was named defender of the year, Stefan Johansen was the midfielder of the year and the head coach, Ronny Deila, won the "manager of the year" award.

== Teams ==
Sixteen teams competed in the league – the top fourteen teams from the previous season and the two teams promoted from the 1. divisjon The promoted teams were Start and Sarpsborg 08 (both returning after a season's absence). They replaced Fredrikstad (ending their two-year spell in the top flight) and Stabæk (relegated after seven years in the top flight).

=== Stadiums and locations ===
Locations of the teams in the 2013 Tippeligaen

Note: Table lists in alphabetical order.

Team	Ap.	Location	Arena	Turf	Capacity
Aalesund	12	Ålesund	Color Line Stadion	Artificial	10,778
Brann	57	Bergen	Brann Stadion	Natural	17,824
Haugesund	7	Haugesund	Haugesund Stadion	Natural	8,800
Hønefoss	3	Hønefoss	Aka Arena	Artificial	4,256
Lillestrøm	50	Lillestrøm	Åråsen Stadion	Natural	12,250
Molde	37	Molde	Aker Stadion	Natural	11,800
Odd	32	Skien	Skagerak Arena	Artificial	13,500
Rosenborg	50	Trondheim	Lerkendal stadion	Natural	21,166
Sandnes Ulf	4	Sandnes	Sandnes Idrettspark	Natural	4,969
Sarpsborg 08	2	Sarpsborg	Sarpsborg Stadion	Artificial	4,700
Sogndal	15	Sogndalsfjøra	Fosshaugane Campus	Artificial	5,523
Start	37	Kristiansand	Sør Arena	Artificial	14,563
Strømsgodset	26	Drammen	Marienlyst Stadion	Artificial	7,500
Tromsø	27	Tromsø	Alfheim Stadion	Artificial	6,859
Vålerenga	53	Oslo	Ullevaal Stadion	Natural	25,572
Viking	64	Stavanger	Viking Stadion	Natural	16,300

=== Personnel and kits ===
Team	Manager	Captain	Kit manufacturer	Shirt sponsor
Aalesund	(Sweden) Jan Jönsson	(Norway) Jonatan Tollås	Umbro	Sparebanken Møre
Brann	(Norway) Rune Skarsfjord	(Sweden) Markus Jonsson	Hummel	Sparebanken Vest
Haugesund	(Norway) Jostein Grindhaug	(Norway) Per Morten Kristiansen	Umbro	Sparebanken Vest
Hønefoss	(Norway) Leif Gunnar Smerud	(Norway) Tor Øyvind Hovda	Legea	AKA
Lillestrøm	(Sweden) Magnus Haglund	(Norway) Frode Kippe	Legea	Vann For Livet
Molde	(Norway) Ole Gunnar Solskjær	(Norway) Daniel Berg Hestad	Umbro	Sparebanken Møre
Odd	(Norway) Dag-Eilev Fagermo	(Norway) Steffen Hagen	Adidas	Skagerak
Rosenborg	(Norway) Per Joar Hansen	(Norway) Tore Reginiussen	Adidas	REMA 1000
Sandnes Ulf	(Norway) Asle Andersen	(Norway) Aksel Berget Skjølsvik	Hummel	Øster Hus
Sarpsborg 08	(England) Brian Deane	(Norway) Ole Christoffer Heieren Hansen	Legea	Borregaard
Sogndal	(Sweden) Jonas Olsson	(Norway) Per-Egil Flo	Umbro	Sparebanken Vest
Start	(Norway) Mons Ivar Mjelde	(Norway) Espen Hoff	Umbro	Netthandelen.no
Strømsgodset	(Norway) Ronny Deila	(Ghana) Adam Larsen Kwarasey	Diadora	NextGenTel
Tromsø	(Norway) Agnar Christensen	(Finland) Miika Koppinen	Legea	Sparebanken Nord-Norge
Vålerenga	(Norway) Kjetil Rekdal	(Norway) Christian Grindheim	Adidas	None
Viking	(Sweden) Kjell Jonevret	(Iceland) Indriði Sigurðsson	Diadora	Lyse

== League table ==
Pos	Team	Pld	W	D	L	GF	GA	GD	Pts	Qualification or relegation
1	Strømsgodset (C)	30	19	6	5	66	26	+40	63	Qualification for the Champions League second qualifying round
2	Rosenborg	30	18	8	4	50	25	+25	62	Qualification for the Europa League first qualifying round
3	Haugesund	30	15	6	9	41	39	+2	51	Qualification for the Europa League first qualifying round
4	Aalesund	30	14	7	9	55	44	+11	49	
5	Viking	30	12	10	8	41	36	+5	46	
6	Molde	30	12	8	10	47	38	+9	44	Qualification for the Europa League second qualifying round (Note: Molde qualified for the second qualifying round of the UEFA Europa League as winners of the 2013 Norwegian Cup.)
7	Odd	30	11	7	12	43	39	+4	40	
8	Brann	30	11	6	13	46	46	0	39	
9	Start	30	10	8	12	43	46	−3	38	
10	Lillestrøm	30	9	9	12	37	44	−7	36	
11	Vålerenga	30	10	6	14	41	50	−9	36	
12	Sogndal	30	8	9	13	33	48	−15	33	
13	Sandnes Ulf	30	9	6	15	36	58	−22	33	
14	Sarpsborg 08 (O)	30	8	7	15	40	58	−18	31	Qualification for the relegation play-offs
15	Tromsø (R)	30	7	8	15	41	50	−9	29	Europa League qualifying and relegation to First Division (Note: Norway was among the best three associations in the UEFA Fair Play ranking and thus received an additional spot in the first qualifying round of the Europa League, Tromsø IL received the qualifying spot for their ranking in Tippeligaen's Fair Play ranking.)
16	Hønefoss (R)	30	6	11	13	34	47	−13	29	Relegation to First Division

Source: fotball.no
Rules for classification: 1) points; 2) goal difference; 3) number of goals scored.
(C) Champions; (O) Play-off winners; (R) Relegated

=== Positions by round ===
Team ╲ Round	1	2	3	4	5	6	7	8	9	10	11	12	13	14	15	16	17	18	19	20	21	22	23	24	25	26	27	28	29	30
Strømsgodset	3	9	9	4	3	2	1	1	1	1	1	1	1	1	1	2	2	2	2	2	2	2	2	2	2	1	1	1	1	1
Rosenborg	6	1	1	2	2	5	5	3	3	2	2	2	2	2	2	1	1	1	1	1	1	1	1	1	1	2	2	2	2	2
Haugesund	16	15	13	10	8	7	9	8	6	5	6	6	6	7	6	6	7	5	5	5	4	5	5	5	5	4	3	3	3	3
Aalesund	1	2	2	1	1	1	2	4	2	4	3	5	3	3	3	3	4	3	3	3	3	3	3	4	4	5	6	5	4	4
Viking	5	8	3	3	4	3	3	6	4	6	4	3	4	5	5	5	3	4	4	4	5	4	4	3	3	3	4	6	6	5
Molde	12	13	16	16	16	16	16	16	16	16	16	15	15	14	11	10	13	12	9	10	10	8	7	6	6	6	5	4	5	6
Odd	13	14	11	14	14	15	14	14	15	15	15	14	14	11	9	11	9	8	7	7	9	11	12	10	8	8	7	7	7	7
Brann	2	11	4	6	5	4	4	2	5	3	5	4	5	4	4	4	5	6	6	6	6	6	6	7	7	7	8	8	8	8
Start	4	7	7	7	6	9	10	11	12	9	13	13	13	15	15	16	16	16	14	14	15	14	14	12	10	10	11	12	10	9
Lillestrøm	9	3	8	5	7	6	6	7	10	10	12	9	10	13	14	12	10	10	10	12	11	9	8	8	9	9	9	9	9	10
Vålerenga	14	10	12	15	15	12	11	13	14	12	11	12	12	9	10	8	6	7	8	8	8	10	9	9	11	11	10	10	11	11
Sogndal	9	12	15	12	12	14	13	12	9	11	8	8	8	6	7	7	8	9	11	9	7	7	10	11	12	12	12	11	12	12
Sandnes Ulf	15	16	14	11	11	10	12	15	13	14	14	16	16	16	16	15	12	13	12	11	12	12	11	13	13	13	13	13	13	13
Sarpsborg 08	7	4	6	9	10	11	8	5	8	8	9	10	9	10	12	13	14	14	15	15	16	16	16	16	16	16	15	15	14	14
Tromsø	7	5	5	8	9	8	7	9	7	7	7	7	7	8	8	9	11	11	13	13	13	13	13	14	14	14	14	14	15	15
Hønefoss BK	11	6	10	13	13	13	15	10	11	13	10	11	11	12	13	14	15	15	16	16	14	15	15	15	15	15	16	16	16	16

Source: nifs.no
Notes: As of the last match in each round; delayed matches are not included.

== Relegation play-offs ==
The 14th-placed team, Sarpsborg 08, took part in a two-legged play-off against Ranheim, the winners of the 2013 1. divisjon promotion play-offs, to decide who would play in the 2014 Tippeligaen.

First leg

13 November 2013
19:00 CET (UTC+1)

Sarpsborg 08	1–0	Ranheim
Samuel 45'	Report

Sarpsborg Stadion, Sarpsborg
Attendance: 3,355
Referee: Tom Harald Hagen

Second leg

16 November 2013
12:00 CET (UTC+1)

Ranheim	0–2	Sarpsborg 08
	Report	Elyounoussi 35', 59'

DNB Arena, Trondheim
Attendance: 1,085
Referee: Kristoffer Helgerud

Sarpsborg 08 won 3–0 on aggregate and maintained their position in the 2014 Tippeligaen; Ranheim stayed in the 1. divisjon.

== Results ==
Home \ Away	AAL	SKB	HAU	HØN	LSK	MFK	ODD	RBK	ULF	S08	SIL	IKS	SIF	TIL	VIF	VIK
Aalesund	—	0–0	3–0	4–3	7–1	1–3	2–0	2–2	2–3	3–1	2–2	1–1	0–1	0–0	1–0	2–1
Brann	2–0	—	0–1	0–0	1–1	1–0	2–0	1–4	6–1	3–1	1–0	2–0	1–1	4–1	3–1	2–0
Haugesund	1–2	2–1	—	1–0	3–2	1–1	3–1	3–1	3–1	0–1	0–1	3–2	2–1	1–0	1–0	1–1
Hønefoss BK	2–5	1–1	0–1	—	1–0	0–1	1–1	1–2	0–1	3–1	3–1	0–1	2–0	1–1	1–2	2–2
Lillestrøm	1–1	2–0	3–0	1–2	—	2–0	1–0	0–3	2–2	2–2	2–2	3–2	1–1	3–2	0–1	0–1
Molde	4–1	2–0	1–5	4–0	1–2	—	1–1	1–0	4–1	3–1	1–2	0–1	1–2	1–0	4–0	1–1
Odd	5–1	1–3	4–0	3–2	2–1	1–1	—	0–1	3–0	2–2	0–0	0–1	1–1	3–1	2–0	1–1
Rosenborg	2–1	4–0	1–1	0–0	1–0	0–0	3–2	—	0–1	4–2	2–0	1–1	1–0	2–1	0–0	2–1
Sandnes Ulf	0–1	3–1	1–1	1–1	1–1	0–0	2–4	2–3	—	2–0	1–3	3–1	2–1	2–1	1–2	0–1
Sarpsborg 08	0–2	3–2	2–1	1–1	0–1	1–0	0–1	1–2	3–2	—	0–1	2–1	2–4	3–0	3–3	2–1
Sogndal	1–2	3–1	1–1	1–1	1–2	1–2	2–0	0–4	2–1	0–0	—	1–1	0–5	2–2	1–2	1–0
Start	2–2	3–3	1–2	3–2	1–0	1–1	0–1	0–1	7–0	1–1	2–0	—	0–6	2–2	1–0	1–2
Strømsgodset	2–1	2–0	4–0	6–1	1–0	5–2	3–1	2–2	2–0	1–1	3–1	1–0	—	3–1	2–1	3–1
Tromsø	1–2	2–0	2–1	1–1	2–0	2–3	2–1	1–0	0–1	5–0	2–2	2–3	0–0	—	2–2	4–3
Vålerenga	2–1	4–3	1–2	1–2	1–1	3–3	1–2	1–2	2–0	5–3	1–0	1–3	0–3	2–0	—	2–2
Viking	1–3	3–2	0–0	0–0	2–2	2–1	1–0	0–0	1–1	2–1	4–1	3–0	1–0	2–1	1–0	—

Source: NIFS (in Norwegian)
Legend: Blue = home team win; Yellow = draw; Red = away team win.

== Season statistics ==
=== Top scorers ===
Rank	Player	Club	Goals	Games	Average
1	(Norway) Frode Johnsen	Odd	16	30	0.53
2	(Morocco) Abderrazak Hamdallah	Aalesund	15	27	0.56
3	(Norway) Ola Kamara	Strømsgodset	12	14	0.86
4	(Denmark) Christian Gytkjær	Haugesund	11	25	0.44
4	(Iceland) Matthías Vilhjálmsson	Start	11	29	0.38
6	(Norway) Morten Berre	Vålerenga	10	26	0.38
6	(Nigeria) Leke James	Aalesund	10	26	0.38
6	(Senegal) Malick Mane	Sogndal	10	29	0.34
6	(Finland) Riku Riski	Hønefoss	10	29	0.34
10	(Nigeria) John Chibuike	Rosenborg	9	24	0.38
10	(Austria) Martin Pušić	Brann	9	27	0.33
10	(Nigeria) Daniel Chima Chukwu	Molde	9	28	0.32
10	(Norway) Amin Askar	Brann	9	29	0.31
10	(Norway) Torgeir Børven	Vålerenga	9	29	0.31
10	(Norway) Trond Olsen	Viking	9	29	0.31

=== Top assists ===
Rank	Player	Club	Assists
1	(Norway) Øyvind Storflor	Strømsgodset	12
2	(Norway) Erik Huseklepp	Brann	9
3	(Brazil) Daniel Bamberg	Haugesund	8
4	(Czech Republic) Jan Lecjaks	Vålerenga	7
4	(Norway) Fredrik Carlsen	Aalesund	7
4	(Norway) Espen Hoff	Start	7
4	(Norway) Johan Lædre Bjørdal	Viking	7
4	(Norway) Espen Børufsen	Start	7
4	(Norway) Jo Nymo Matland	Aalesund	7
4	(Norway) Petter Vaagan Moen	Lillestrøm	7
4	(Albania) Herolind Shala	Odd	7
4	(Iceland) Guðmundur Þórarinsson	Sarpsborg 08	7

=== Discipline ===
==== Player ====
- Most yellow cards: 7
  - (Costa Rica) Bismar Acosta (Start)
  - (Norway) Jørgen Horn (Strømsgodset)
  - (Norway) Magne Hoseth (Molde)
  - (Norway) Azar Karadas (Sogndal)
  - (Iceland) Guðmundur Kristjánsson (Start)
  - (Norway) Petter Vaagan Moen (Lillestrøm)
  - (Iceland) Þórarinn Ingi Valdimarsson (Sarpsborg 08)
- Most red cards: 1
  - 34 players

==== Club ====
- Most yellow cards: 50
  - Sarpsborg 08
- Most red cards: 3
  - Brann
  - Haugesund
  - Molde
  - Odd
  - Rosenborg
  - Sandnes Ulf
  - Strømsgodset

=== Attendances ===
Pos	Team	Total	High	Low	Average	Change
1	Rosenborg	222,039	20,188	11,236	14,803	+10.5%
2	Brann	169,574	17,179	9,348	11,305	−8.2%
3	Viking	154,263	13,218	8,525	10,284	+3.9%
4	Vålerenga	148,497	13,609	7,798	9,900	−8.1%
5	Molde	132,424	11,074	7,854	8,828	−5.7%
6	Aalesund	122,885	10,101	6,925	8,192	−10.8%
7	Strømsgodset	97,889	7,544	5,175	6,526	+7.0%
8	Start	92,747	10,345	4,729	6,183	+41.4%^{1}
9	Lillestrøm	82,224	9,766	4,052	5,482	−3.7%
10	Odd	79,473	6,397	4,466	5,298	+2.3%
11	Haugesund	76,183	7,889	4,268	5,079	+12.1%
12	Tromsø	66,684	6,392	3,325	4,446	+6.1%
13	Sarpsborg 08	55,345	4,823	3,061	3,690	+41.4%^{1}
14	Sogndal	50,704	4,581	2,418	3,380	−7.6%
15	Sandnes Ulf	47,084	4,969	2,241	3,139	−18.3%
16	Hønefoss	40,765	3,431	2,183	2,718	−7.9%
	League total	1,638,780	20,188	2,183	6,828	−2.5%

Source: nifs.no
Notes:
1: Team played last season in 1. divisjon.

== Awards ==
=== Annual awards ===
==== Player of the Year ====
The Player of the Year awarded to

==== Goalkeeper of the Year ====
The Goalkeeper of the Year awarded to (Norway) Adam Larsen Kwarasey (Strømsgodset)

==== Defender of the Year ====
The Defender of the Year awarded to (Norway) Lars-Christopher Vilsvik (Strømsgodset)

==== Midfielder of the Year ====
The Midfielder of the Year awarded to (Norway) Stefan Johansen (Strømsgodset)

==== Striker of the Year ====
The Striker of the Year awarded to (Norway) Frode Johnsen (Odds)

==== Manager of the Year ====
The Manager of the Year awarded to (Norway) Ronny Deila (Strømsgodset)
