= Terje Skarsfjord =

Norwegian football manager (1942–2018)

Terje Skarsfjord (28 June 1942 – 15 January 2018) was a Norwegian football player and manager. A native of Narvik, he spent the majority of his playing career at his hometown club Mjølner in the 1960s and 1970s, and also lived a period in Trondheim where he played for FK Kvik. After his playing career ended, he managed his former club Mjølner, but became more famous as manager of Tromsø, whom he guided to victory in the Norwegian Football Cup in 1996.

Skarsfjord also authored and co-authored several educational books about coaching and how to improve your skills.
In 1981 and 1982 he coached Hødd.

He had several spells as manager of Tromsø: 1996, 1999–2001, and 2003. During his most successful spell Tromsø won the Norwegian Football Cup in 1996. He returned in 1999 for a less successful spell which ended with him being replaced by Swedish manager Tommy Svensson.

He returned again in 2003 when the team looked set for relegation, hopelessly adrift at the bottom of the table. He then masterminded an incredible recovery in which Tromsø avoided relegation by a last-gasp goal by Arne Vidar Moen in the fifth minute of overtime against Rosenborg BK, winning the match 1–0. This meant that Aalesunds FK were surprisingly relegated after having seemed safe, in shock and disappointment their manager Ivar Morten Normark commented that he would go home and eat only dry bread and drink a diet soda, while television pundit Ivar Hoff said the tension was so great that he felt he needed to have a cigarette. Skarsfjord's popularity at the time was such that the local newspaper speculated that he might have won if he had decided to run for mayor.

Terje Skarsfjord was father of the former footballer and football coach Rune Skarsfjord.
