= Morten Moldskred =

Norwegian footballer (born 1980)

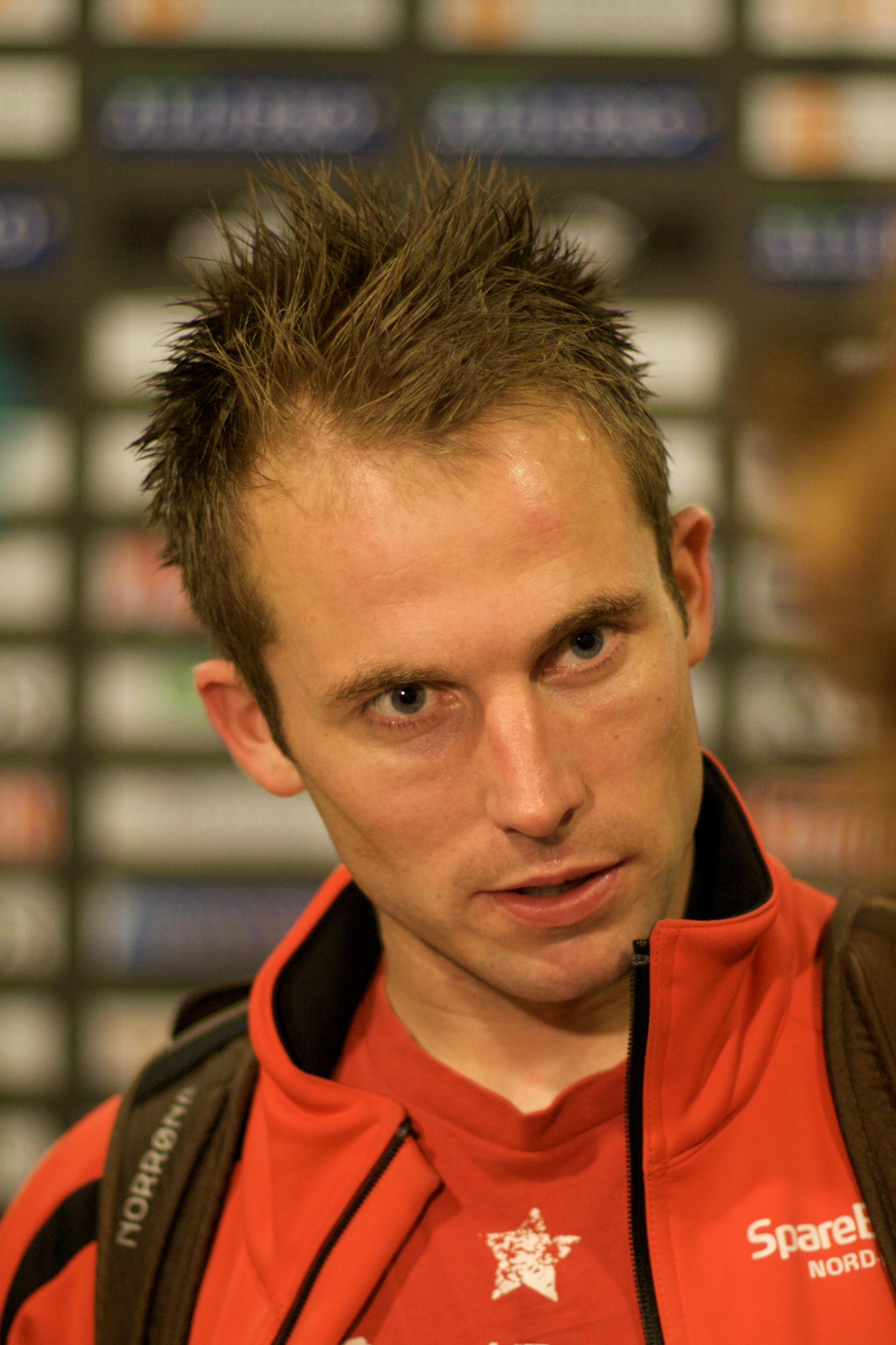

Personal information
- Full name: Morten Opsahl Moldskred
- Date of birth: 13 June 1980 (age 46)
- Place of birth: Ulsteinvik, Norway
- Height: 1.76 m (5 ft 9 in)
- Position: Winger

Youth career
- Austvatn
- Haddal
- 1993–1996: Hødd

Senior career*
Years	Team	Apps	(Gls)
1996–2001	Hødd	92	(28)
2002	Moss	11	(1)
2003–2005	Aalesund	79	(20)
2006	Haugesund	0	(0)
2006–2010	Tromsø	76	(29)
2010–2012	Rosenborg	37	(8)
2012–2013	AGF	2	(0)
2013–2015	Tromsø	83	(13)
2016–2017	Finnsnes	18	(3)

International career
2009–2011	Norway	9	(1)
- * Club domestic league appearances and goals

Morten Moldskred (born 13 June 1980) is a Norwegian former professional footballer who played as a winger.

== Club career ==
=== Early years ===
Moldskred started his career in Hødd from Ulsteinvik, where he stayed until the 2001 season when he was sold to Moss. In 2002 Moss was promoted to the Norwegian Premier League where he played in 11 games, scoring one goal. Moss were relegated the same year.

=== Aalesund and Haugesund ===
After the 2002 season Moldskred was sold to Aalesund who had been promoted to the top-flight. He played in all games, scoring 4 goals in the process, but for the second time in a row he suffered the experience of being relegated. In 2004, he had his finest season so far in his career, notching up 15 goals in 29 appearances in Adeccoligaen, helping Aalesund to another promotion. He only managed 1 goal in 24 games the following season, going through another relegation from the elite group of clubs.

He was sold to Haugesund before the 2006 season, but suffered a cruciate ligament injury right after signing, and did not play any games.

=== Tromsø ===
Halfway through the 2006 season, Premier League side Tromsø picked him up on a three-year deal. His former coach at Aalesund, Ivar Morten Normark was coach at the time. After the injury he got while at Haugesund, it was expected that he was going to be out for the rest of the season, but amazingly he managed to make his debut on 30 July 2006. He only played three games before another injury definitely held him back for rest of the season.

After a difficult start at Tromsø I.L. with much time on the sideline and frequent injuries, Moldskred finally got his breakthrough and earned a place as forward in the regular starting line-up in the summer of 2007. After the departure of veteran and club-legend Ole Martin Årst in a mid-season transfer to Start. Moldskred finished the season in style and ended up the club top-scorer with 12 goals, including three in the final game of the season against the champions Brann.

Another injury set him back a bit during pre season in 2008, but after a slow start, he ended up scoring 10 goals in 21 games, helping Tromsø to a surprising bronze medal in the league.

=== Rosenborg ===
On 7 January 2010, Rosenborg and Tromsø came to agreement over a transfer fee and Moldskred signed under for Norwegian powerhouse Rosenborg a few days later.

Moldskred scored his first goal for Rosenborg on 13 May 2010 in the first round of the Norwegian Football Cup against 3rd division side Stjørdals/Blink.

He scored his first league goal for Rosenborg on 25 July 2010 against Stabæk in a 2–1 victory for Rosenborg, scoring the winner goal in injury time at Telenor Arena.

=== AGF ===
On 26 January 2012 Moldskred signed with the Danish club AGF Århus.

=== Tromsø ===
On 31 January 2013, he signed with Tromsø IL.

=== Retirement ===
Moldskred announced his retirement from professional football on 17 February 2016, at age 35. He joined lower league club Finnsnes in May 2016. He left the team in November where he began playing futsal for local Tromsø club Berserk.

== International career ==
Moldskred made his international debut for Norway on 5 September 2009, when he was substituted in for Thorstein Helstad in the 2010 World Cup qualifier away to Iceland. His first international goal came in his fifth match, a friendly away to Slovakia, where he scored the lone goal securing Norway their fourth consecutive win, and sixth match in a row without a loss.

== Career statistics ==
Season	Club	League	League		Cup		Continental		Total	
Season	Club	League	Apps	Goals	Apps	Goals	Apps	Goals	Apps	Goals
1998	Hødd	Adeccoligaen					-	-		
1999	Hødd	Adeccoligaen	10	2			-	-	10	2
2000	Hødd	Adeccoligaen					-	-		
2001	Hødd	Adeccoligaen	26	7	2	0	-	-	28	7
2002	Moss	Tippeligaen	11	1	3	2	-	-	14	3
2003	Aalesund	Tippeligaen	26	4	3	3	-	-	29	7
2004	Aalesund	Adeccoligaen	29	15			-	-		
2005	Aalesund	Tippeligaen	24	1	4	2	-	-	28	3
2006	Haugesund	Adeccoligaen	0	0	0	0	-	-	0	0
2006	Tromsø	Tippeligaen	3	0	0	0				
2007	Tromsø	Tippeligaen	22	12	4	4			26	16
2008	Tromsø	Tippeligaen	21	10	4	3	-	-	25	13
2009	Tromsø	Tippeligaen	30	7	5	7	0	0	35	14
2010	Rosenborg	Tippeligaen	20	3	3	3	10	1	33	7
2011	Rosenborg	Tippeligaen	17	5	2	0	2	0	21	5
2011–2012	AGF	Superliga	1	0	0	0	0	0	1	0
2012–2013	AGF	Superliga	1	0	0	0	0	0	1	0
2013	Tromsø	Tippeligaen	30	5	2	0	12	1	44	6
2014	Tromsø	1. divisjon	28	7	2	0	4	2	34	9
2015	Tromsø	Tippeligaen	25	1	2	0	-	-	27	1
2016	Finnsnes	PostNord-ligaen	17	3	0	0	0	0	17	3
2017	Finnsnes	PostNord-ligaen	1	0	0	0	0	0	1	0
Career total			341	83	36	24	28	4	405	111

=== International goals ===
Morten Moldskred: International goals
#	Date	Venue	Opponent	Score	Result	Competition
1	3 March 2010	Stadium Pod Dubňom, Žilina	Slovakia	0–1	Win	Friendly

== Honours ==
=== Club ===
Rosenborg

- Norwegian Premier League Championship: 2010
