= Ulseth =

Ulseth is a surname. Notable people with the surname include:

- Otto Ulseth (born 1957), Norwegian football coach and journalist
- Steve Ulseth (born 1959), American ice hockey player
