= 2006 Tippeligaen =

62nd season of top-tier football league in Norway

Tippeligaen
- Season: 2006
- Dates: 9 April – 5 November
- Champions: Rosenborg; 20th title
- Relegated: HamKam; Molde
- Champions League: Rosenborg
- UEFA Cup: Fredrikstad; Brann; Vålerenga; Lillestrøm
- Matches: 182
- Goals: 521 (2.86 per match)
- Top goalscorer: Daniel Nannskog (19 goals)
- Biggest home win: Stabæk 8–0 Molde (29 October 2006)
- Biggest away win: HamKam 1–5 Stabæk (5 November 2006)
- Highest scoring: Fredrikstad 5–3 Tromsø (29 May 2006); Brann 5–3 Sandefjord (17 September 2006); Stabæk 8–0 Molde (29 October 2006)
- Longest winning run: 8 games Rosenborg
- Longest unbeaten run: 12 games Rosenborg
- Longest winless run: 8 games Odd Grenland
- Longest losing run: 6 games Odd Grenland
- Highest attendance: 22,330; Rosenborg 1–1 Odd Grenland (16 May 2006)
- Lowest attendance: 2,563; Lyn 2–0 Molde (6 August 2006)
- Average attendance: 9,101 ▼4.2%

The 2006 Tippeligaen was the 62nd completed season of top division football in Norway. The season began on April 9, 2006 and ended on November 5, 2006. Rosenborg became champions on October 29, with one round to go, by defeating Viking at home. The other main contenders for the title were Brann and Lillestrøm, the former securing their place as runners-up on the same day.

Rosenborg won their twentieth league title.

== Notable events ==
- Tromsø installed artificial turf at their home ground Alfheim stadion during the summer break.
- Tom Nordlie was sacked as coach of Start in July and was replaced by Stig Inge Bjørnebye.
- Ivar Morten Normark was sacked as coach of Tromsø in July, and was replaced by Steinar Nilsen in August.
- Rosenborg's coach Per-Mathias Høgmo took two months of sick leave from July 27. Assistant Knut Tørum served as caretaker manager.
- Kjetil Rekdal resigned as coach of Vålerenga on August 21, following the club's exit from the Norwegian Cup. Rekdal held the position for six years, leading his team to one cup triumph in 2002 and the league championship in 2005. The assistant coach Petter Myhre took over Rekdal's place.
- Tom Prahl was sacked as coach of Viking in September and was replaced by Tom Nordlie who earlier in the season was sacked as coach in Start.
- On October 31, Høgmo resigns as Rosenborg manager, effective immediately. Tørum, who led ROS from 10 points behind leaders Brann to win the title with one round to spare, is expected to be elevated to permanent manager.
- After the club's relegation, Ham-Kam's coach Frode Grodås, was sacked on November 7.
- Arild Stavrum was sacked as coach of Molde on November 8, after the club came dead last in the league.
- Uwe Rösler was sacked as coach of Lillestrøm on November 13.
- Tom Nordlie and Uwe Rösler traded jobs, Nordlie to Lillestrøm, and Rösler to Viking.

== Teams and locations ==
Fourteen teams competed in the league – the top twelve teams from the previous season, and two teams promoted from 1. divisjon.

Locations of the teams in 2006 Tippeligaen

Note: Table lists in alphabetical order.

Team	Ap.	Location	Stadium	Turf	Capacity
Brann	50	Bergen	Brann Stadion	Natural	17,500
Fredrikstad	37	Fredrikstad	Fredrikstad Stadion	Natural	10,500
HamKam	21	Hamar	Briskeby	Natural	8,068
Lillestrøm	43	Lillestrøm	Åråsen Stadion	Natural	12,000
Lyn	33	Oslo	Ullevaal Stadion	Natural	25,572
Molde	31	Molde	Aker Stadion	Natural	11,167
Odd Grenland	26	Skien	Odd Stadion	Natural	8,000
Rosenborg	43	Trondheim	Lerkendal Stadion	Natural	21,166
Sandefjord	1	Sandefjord	Storstadion	Natural	7,000
Stabæk	11	Bærum	Nadderud Stadion	Natural	8,000
Start	32	Kristiansand	Kristiansand Stadion	Natural	14,000
Tromsø	20	Tromsø	Alfheim Stadion	Natural/Artificial^{1}	9,362
Vålerenga	46	Oslo	Ullevaal Stadion	Natural	25,572
Viking	57	Stavanger	Viking Stadion	Natural	15,350

^{1} Tromsø installed artificial turf on Alfheim Stadion in the summer break during the 2006 FIFA World Cup.

== League table ==
Pos	Team	Pld	W	D	L	GF	GA	GD	Pts	Qualification or relegation
1	Rosenborg (C)	26	15	8	3	47	24	+23	53	Qualification for the Champions League second qualifying round
2	Brann	26	14	4	8	39	36	+3	46	Qualification for the UEFA Cup first qualifying round (Note: Lillestrøm qualified for the UEFA Cup first qualifying round through the UEFA Fair Play ranking award.)
3	Vålerenga	26	13	5	8	43	28	+15	44	Qualification for the UEFA Cup first qualifying round
4	Lillestrøm	26	12	8	6	44	33	+11	44	Qualification for the UEFA Cup first qualifying round
5	Stabæk	26	10	9	7	53	36	+17	39	
6	Start	26	10	7	9	29	32	−3	37	
7	Lyn	26	10	5	11	33	36	−3	35	
8	Fredrikstad	26	8	8	10	38	46	−8	32	Qualification for the UEFA Cup second qualifying round (Note: Fredrikstad qualified for the UEFA Cup second qualifying round after winning the Norwegian Cup.)
9	Sandefjord	26	9	5	12	37	47	−10	32	
10	Tromsø	26	8	5	13	33	39	−6	29	
11	Viking	26	8	5	13	31	37	−6	29	
12	Odd Grenland (O)	26	7	8	11	30	38	−8	29	Qualification for the relegation play-offs
13	Ham-Kam (R)	26	7	7	12	35	39	−4	28	Relegation to First Division
14	Molde (R)	26	7	4	15	29	50	−21	25	Relegation to First Division

Source: fotball.no
Rules for classification: 1) points; 2) goal difference; 3) number of goals scored.
(C) Champions; (O) Play-off winners; (R) Relegated

== Relegation play-offs ==
- Odd Grenland defeated Bryne 10–1 on aggregate in a two-legged play-off:
8 November 2006
19:00 CET (UTC+1)

Odd Grenland	3–0	Bryne
Dale 51', 70'; Hvidén-Watson 85'	Report

Odd Stadion, Skien
Attendance: 5,363
Referee: Espen Berntsen

11 November 2006
13:00 CET (UTC+1)

Bryne	1–7	Odd Grenland
Oyuga 8'	Report	Dale 9', 28', 46'; Hvidén-Watson 38'; Borchers 74'; Bentsen 76'; Jarstein 82' (pen.)

Bryne Stadion, Bryne
Attendance: 3,014
Referee: Roy Helge Olsen

== Results ==
Home \ Away	BRA	FRE	HAM	LIL	LYN	MOL	ODD	ROS	SAN	STB	IKS	TRO	VÅL	VIK
Brann	—	3–1	2–1	1–1	2–0	2–1	1–0	1–3	5–3	2–2	0–1	2–1	3–1	2–0
Fredrikstad	1–1	—	2–2	0–1	1–2	1–1	2–1	1–1	2–1	2–1	4–0	5–3	2–1	2–1
Ham-Kam	4–0	3–1	—	1–2	1–0	1–2	3–0	1–1	3–0	1–5	2–2	2–3	1–1	0–0
Lillestrøm	2–0	1–1	3–1	—	2–0	3–0	2–2	3–3	1–2	2–2	2–1	1–2	2–1	3–1
Lyn	2–0	1–2	1–0	3–3	—	2–0	1–1	1–2	2–0	1–4	1–2	1–3	2–1	0–0
Molde	0–2	4–0	1–1	2–0	0–1	—	2–0	0–2	2–3	1–3	1–1	3–1	0–3	3–1
Odd Grenland	1–3	3–3	3–0	0–3	2–1	0–0	—	0–4	3–1	0–1	2–0	3–2	3–2	0–1
Rosenborg	0–0	1–0	0–3	3–1	2–1	0–1	1–1	—	3–1	1–0	3–0	2–1	3–2	4–1
Sandefjord	0–2	2–0	2–1	1–1	2–2	5–2	1–3	0–2	—	3–1	1–1	1–0	0–2	3–2
Stabæk	1–2	3–2	4–0	2–2	3–2	8–0	1–1	1–1	0–0	—	2–2	3–1	2–2	1–1
Start	0–1	0–0	2–0	2–0	0–0	3–2	2–1	2–1	0–2	1–0	—	1–1	1–2	3–1
Tromsø	3–1	3–1	0–2	1–0	1–2	2–0	0–0	1–1	2–2	0–1	1–0	—	0–1	0–0
Vålerenga	2–1	5–1	0–0	0–1	1–2	2–0	0–0	0–0	4–1	3–1	1–0	3–1	—	1–0
Viking	5–0	1–1	2–1	1–2	1–2	3–1	1–0	1–3	1–0	3–1	1–2	1–0	1–2	—

Source: NIFS (in Norwegian)
Legend: Blue = home team win; Yellow = draw; Red = away team win.

== Season statistics ==
=== Top scorers ===
Rank	Scorer	Club	Goals
1	(Sweden) Daniel Nannskog	Stabæk	19
2	(Iceland) Veigar Páll Gunnarsson	Stabæk	18
3	(Norway) Steffen Iversen	Rosenborg	17
4	(Nigeria) Peter Ijeh	Viking	11
4	(Malta) Michael Mifsud	Lillestrøm	11
4	(Norway) Ole Martin Årst	Tromsø	11
7	(Slovenia) Robert Koren	Lillestrøm	10
7	(Sweden) Andreas Tegström	Sandefjord	10
9	(Norway) Jan-Derek Sørensen	Vålerenga	9
9	(Norway) Bengt Sæternes	Brann	9

=== Discipline ===
==== Player ====
- Most yellow cards: 8
  - (Denmark) Jan Michaelsen (HamKam)
- Most red cards: 1
  - 28 players

==== Club ====
- Most yellow cards: 49
  - Molde
- Most red cards: 4
  - Tromsø

=== Attendances ===
Pos	Team	Total	High	Low	Average	Change
1	Rosenborg	252,718	22,330	15,897	19,440	+10.8%
2	Brann	216,789	19,254	13,528	16,676	+12.5%
3	Viking	180,831	16,251	11,351	13,910	+1.5%
4	Vålerenga	180,348	20,703	8,457	13,873	−11.4%
5	Lillestrøm	112,006	11,610	6,724	8,616	+9.6%
6	Fredrikstad	105,741	10,500	6,342	8,134	−7.7%
7	Start	99,798	9,738	6,116	7,677	−24.0%
8	Lyn	92,073	16,049	2,563	7,083	+9.3%
9	Molde	79,653	9,215	4,351	6,127	−5.9%
10	HamKam	71,574	8,063	4,082	5,506	−2.2%
11	Sandefjord	69,171	7,197	3,722	5,321	n/a^{1}
12	Tromsø	65,889	7,480	4,007	5,068	+0.1%
13	Stabæk	65,793	6,907	3,998	5,061	n/a^{1}
14	Odd Grenland	63,923	6,315	4,021	4,917	−8.2%
	League total	1,656,307	22,330	2,563	9,101	−4.2%

Source: nifs.no
Notes:
1: Team played last season in 1. divisjon.

== Fair Play ==
- The fair play table, using UEFA's Fair Play ranking system with scores from 1 to 10, was as such:
1. Fredrikstad 8.02
2. Rosenborg 7.97
3. Vålerenga 7.88
4. Lillestrøm 7.83
5. Start 7.82
6. Viking 7.81
7. Sandefjord 7.77
8. Stabæk 7.76
9. Brann 7.72
10. Molde 7.59
11. Odd Grenland 7.57
12. Tromsø 7.53
13. Lyn 7.43
14. Ham-Kam 7.23
