= 2010 Tippeligaen =

66th season of top-tier football league in Norway

Tippeligaen
- Season: 2010
- Dates: 14 March – 7 November
- Champions: Rosenborg; 22nd title
- Relegated: Hønefoss; Kongsvinger; Sandefjord
- Champions League: Rosenborg
- Europa League: Vålerenga; Tromsø; Aalesund; Strømsgodset
- Matches played: 240
- Goals scored: 731 (3.05 per match)
- Top goalscorer: Baye Djiby Fall (16 goals)
- Biggest home win: Vålerenga 8–1 Start (2 August 2010)
- Biggest away win: Strømsgodset 0–4 Odd Grenland (5 May 2010); Hønefoss 0–4 Stabæk (22 August 2010)
- Highest scoring: Vålerenga 8–1 Start (2 August 2010); Strømsgodset 5–4 Lillestrøm (7 November 2010)
- Longest winning run: 5 games Rosenborg; Vålerenga
- Longest unbeaten run: 30 games Rosenborg
- Longest winless run: 27 games Sandefjord
- Longest losing run: 7 games Sandefjord
- Highest attendance: 21,474; Rosenborg 3–0 Hønefoss (16 May 2010)
- Lowest attendance: 1,142; Sandefjord 0–1 Lillestrøm (3 October 2010)
- Average attendance: 8,108 ▼9.6%

The 2010 Tippeligaen was the 66th completed season of top division football in Norway. The competition began on 14 March and ended on 7 November. Rosenborg was the defending champions, having secured their twenty-first league championship in 2009. Haugesund, Hønefoss and Kongsvinger entered as the three promoted teams from the 2009 1. divisjon. They replaced Fredrikstad, Bodø/Glimt and Lyn who were relegated to the 2010 1. divisjon.

== Season summary ==
On 6 June, Lillestrøm scored three goals in four minutes and 24 seconds, two of them in injury time, to go from 3–0 down to 3–3 away at Molde. Sandefjord lost 5–0 away to Odd Grenland on 26 September. This was their 23rd consecutive top flight match without winning, breaking a record of 22 set by Os in 1975. The streak would continue for four matches, ending at 27 before Sandefjord won in their 28th attempt on the last day of the season, beating Hønefoss 6–1 at home. On 31 October, Rosenborg played Kongsvinger to a 0–0 draw away, making 2010 the second consecutive season without away losses for Rosenborg.

Kongsvinger and Sandefjord were relegated at the end of the 2010 Tippeligaen season after finishing in the bottom two places of the league table. Sandefjord ended a two-year tenure at the highest football level of Norway, while Kongsvinger returned to the 1. divisjon after just one season. They were replaced by 2010 1. divisjon champions Sogndal and runners-up Sarpsborg 08. Sogndal returned to the Tippeligaen after a six-year hiatus, while Sarpsborg 08 made its debut at the Norwegian top-level league.

Hønefoss as 14th-placed Tippeligaen team had to compete in a relegation/promotion playoff with the 1. divisjon teams ranked third through fifth (Fredrikstad, Løv-Ham and Ranheim) for one spot in the 2011 Tippeligaen. This spot was taken by Fredrikstad, who defeated Hønefoss 8–1 on aggregate in the playoff finals and returned to Norway's top flight after just one season. In turn, Hønefoss had to return to the 1. divisjon, also after just one season.

== Teams ==
Haugesund and Hønefoss were promoted directly from the 1. divisjon at the end of the 2009 season. Kongsvinger defeated Sarpsborg by 5–4 on aggregate in the final matches of the play-off round between the 3rd-, 4th- and 5th-placed team in the 1. divisjon and the 14th-placed team in the Tippeligaen, giving them the sixteenth and final spot.

=== Team summaries ===
Locations of the teams in 2010 Tippeligaen

| Team | Ap. | Location | Stadium | Turf | Capacity | Manager |
|---|---|---|---|---|---|---|
| Aalesund | 9 | Ålesund | Color Line Stadion | Artificial | 10,778 | (Norway) Kjetil Rekdal |
| Brann | 54 | Bergen | Brann Stadion | Natural | 17,317 | (Norway) Rune Skarsfjord |
| Haugesund | 4 | Haugesund | Haugesund stadion | Natural | 8,800 | (Norway) Jostein Grindhaug |
| Hønefoss | 1 | Hønefoss | AKA Arena | Artificial | 4,256 | (Norway) Reidar Vågnes |
| Kongsvinger | 18 | Kongsvinger | Gjemselund stadion | Artificial | 5,000 | (Sweden) Tony Gustavsson |
| Lillestrøm | 47 | Lillestrøm | Åråsen stadion | Natural | 11,637 | (Norway) Henning Berg |
| Molde | 34 | Molde | Aker Stadion | Natural | 11,800 | (Germany) Uwe Rösler |
| Odd Grenland | 29 | Skien | Skagerak Arena | Artificial | 13,500 | (Norway) Dag-Eilev Fagermo |
| Rosenborg | 47 | Trondheim | Lerkendal stadion | Natural | 21,166 | (Norway) Nils Arne Eggen |
| Sandefjord | 4 | Sandefjord | Komplett.no Arena | Natural | 9,000 | (Republic of Ireland) Patrick Walker |
| Stabæk | 15 | Bærum | Telenor Arena^{1} | Artificial | 15,500 | (Sweden) Jan Jönsson |
| Start | 35 | Kristiansand | Sør Arena | Natural | 14,300 | (Norway) Knut Tørum |
| Strømsgodset | 23 | Drammen | Marienlyst Stadion | Artificial | 7,544 | (Norway) Ronny Deila |
| Tromsø | 24 | Tromsø | Alfheim Stadion | Artificial | 7,500 | (Norway) Per-Mathias Høgmo |
| Vålerenga | 50 | Oslo | Ullevaal Stadion | Natural | 25,572 | (Norway) Martin Andresen |
| Viking | 61 | Stavanger | Viking Stadion | Natural | 16,300 | (Norway) Åge Hareide |

^{1}Stabæk also played three home matches in May at Ullevaal Stadion because Telenor Arena was being used to host the Eurovision Song Contest 2010.

=== Managerial changes ===
| Team | Outgoing manager | Manner of departure | Date of vacancy | Table | Incoming manager | Date of appointment | Table |
|---|---|---|---|---|---|---|---|
| Kongsvinger | (Norway) Trond Amundsen | Resigned | 12 April 2010 | 15th | (Sweden) Tony Gustavsson | 26 April 2010 | 15th |
| Hønefoss | (Norway) Ole Bjørn Sundgot | Sacked | 18 April 2010 | 16th | (Norway) Tom Gulbrandsen | 18 April 2010 | 14th |
| Brann | (Norway) Steinar Nilsen | Mutual agreement | 22 May 2010 | 13th | (Norway) Rune Skarsfjord | 25 May 2010 | 13th |
| Rosenborg | (Sweden) Erik Hamrén | Signed with Sweden | 24 May 2010 | 2nd | (Norway) Nils Arne Eggen | 24 May 2010 | 1st |
| Molde | (Sweden) Kjell Jonevret | Sacked | 30 August 2010 | 14th | (Germany) Uwe Rösler | 30 August 2010 | 11th |

== League table ==
| Pos | Team | Pld | W | D | L | GF | GA | GD | Pts | Qualification or relegation |
|---|---|---|---|---|---|---|---|---|---|---|
| 1 | Rosenborg (C) | 30 | 19 | 11 | 0 | 58 | 24 | +34 | 68 | Qualification for the Champions League second qualifying round |
| 2 | Vålerenga | 30 | 19 | 4 | 7 | 69 | 36 | +33 | 61 | Qualification for the Europa League second qualifying round |
| 3 | Tromsø | 30 | 14 | 8 | 8 | 36 | 30 | +6 | 50 | Qualification for the Europa League first qualifying round (Note: Norway was among the best three associations in the UEFA Fair Play ranking and thus received an additional spot in the first qualifying round of the Europa League.) |
| 4 | Aalesund | 30 | 14 | 5 | 11 | 46 | 37 | +9 | 47 | Qualification for the Europa League first qualifying round |
| 5 | Odd Grenland | 30 | 12 | 10 | 8 | 48 | 41 | +7 | 46 | |
| 6 | Haugesund | 30 | 12 | 9 | 9 | 51 | 39 | +12 | 45 | |
| 7 | Strømsgodset | 30 | 13 | 4 | 13 | 51 | 59 | −8 | 43 | Qualification for the Europa League third qualifying round (Note: Strømsgodset qualified for the third qualifying round of the UEFA Europa League as winners of the 2010 Norwegian Cup.) |
| 8 | Start | 30 | 11 | 9 | 10 | 57 | 60 | −3 | 42 | |
| 9 | Viking | 30 | 10 | 11 | 9 | 48 | 41 | +7 | 41 | |
| 10 | Lillestrøm | 30 | 9 | 13 | 8 | 51 | 44 | +7 | 40 | |
| 11 | Molde | 30 | 10 | 10 | 10 | 42 | 45 | −3 | 40 | |
| 12 | Stabæk | 30 | 11 | 6 | 13 | 46 | 47 | −1 | 39 | |
| 13 | Brann | 30 | 8 | 10 | 12 | 48 | 50 | −2 | 34 | |
| 14 | Hønefoss (R) | 30 | 7 | 6 | 17 | 28 | 62 | −34 | 27 | Qualification for the relegation play-offs |
| 15 | Kongsvinger (R) | 30 | 4 | 8 | 18 | 27 | 58 | −31 | 20 | Relegation to First Division |
| 16 | Sandefjord (R) | 30 | 2 | 6 | 22 | 25 | 58 | −33 | 12 | Relegation to First Division |

Source: fotball.no
Rules for classification: 1) points; 2) goal difference; 3) number of goals scored.
(C) Champions; (R) Relegated

== Positions by round ==
| Team ╲ Round | 1 | 2 | 3 | 4 | 5 | 6 | 7 | 8 | 9 | 10 | 11 | 12 | 13 | 14 | 15 | 16 | 17 | 18 | 19 | 20 | 21 | 22 | 23 | 24 | 25 | 26 | 27 | 28 | 29 | 30 |
|---|---|---|---|---|---|---|---|---|---|---|---|---|---|---|---|---|---|---|---|---|---|---|---|---|---|---|---|---|---|---|
| Rosenborg | 7 | 5 | 9 | 4 | 3 | 1 | 2 | 3 | 3 | 2 | 2 | 2 | 2 | 1 | 1 | 1 | 1 | 1 | 1 | 1 | 1 | 1 | 1 | 1 | 1 | 1 | 1 | 1 | 1 | 1 |
| Vålerenga | 2 | 4 | 7 | 9 | 7 | 5 | 6 | 4 | 5 | 5 | 5 | 3 | 5 | 3 | 3 | 2 | 2 | 2 | 2 | 2 | 2 | 2 | 2 | 2 | 2 | 2 | 2 | 2 | 2 | 2 |
| Tromsø | 2 | 10 | 5 | 2 | 2 | 3 | 1 | 1 | 2 | 1 | 1 | 1 | 1 | 2 | 2 | 3 | 3 | 3 | 3 | 3 | 3 | 3 | 3 | 3 | 3 | 3 | 3 | 3 | 3 | 3 |
| Aalesund | 1 | 1 | 1 | 1 | 1 | 2 | 3 | 2 | 1 | 3 | 4 | 5 | 3 | 5 | 4 | 4 | 5 | 4 | 5 | 4 | 4 | 6 | 7 | 4 | 4 | 4 | 6 | 5 | 4 | 4 |
| Odd Grenland | 10 | 8 | 4 | 6 | 8 | 8 | 8 | 11 | 11 | 10 | 7 | 8 | 9 | 6 | 8 | 11 | 10 | 8 | 9 | 8 | 10 | 10 | 8 | 7 | 5 | 6 | 5 | 6 | 5 | 5 |
| Haugesund | 8 | 12 | 13 | 8 | 10 | 9 | 10 | 7 | 8 | 9 | 10 | 12 | 10 | 11 | 9 | 10 | 11 | 10 | 10 | 9 | 8 | 8 | 5 | 6 | 8 | 5 | 4 | 4 | 6 | 6 |
| Strømsgodset | 2 | 3 | 2 | 7 | 5 | 6 | 4 | 6 | 4 | 6 | 8 | 10 | 11 | 10 | 10 | 8 | 6 | 7 | 6 | 5 | 5 | 4 | 4 | 5 | 6 | 9 | 10 | 8 | 9 | 7 |
| Start | 2 | 2 | 6 | 3 | 4 | 4 | 5 | 5 | 6 | 8 | 9 | 7 | 8 | 9 | 11 | 9 | 7 | 6 | 7 | 7 | 7 | 7 | 9 | 8 | 7 | 8 | 8 | 7 | 7 | 8 |
| Viking | 12 | 7 | 11 | 11 | 11 | 12 | 11 | 9 | 9 | 7 | 6 | 6 | 6 | 7 | 6 | 5 | 4 | 5 | 4 | 6 | 6 | 5 | 6 | 9 | 9 | 7 | 9 | 10 | 11 | 9 |
| Lillestrøm | 16 | 11 | 3 | 5 | 6 | 7 | 7 | 8 | 7 | 4 | 3 | 4 | 4 | 4 | 5 | 6 | 8 | 9 | 8 | 10 | 9 | 11 | 10 | 10 | 10 | 10 | 7 | 9 | 8 | 10 |
| Molde | 11 | 14 | 14 | 13 | 13 | 10 | 12 | 12 | 12 | 11 | 12 | 11 | 12 | 12 | 13 | 13 | 13 | 13 | 13 | 13 | 13 | 14 | 13 | 13 | 13 | 13 | 12 | 12 | 12 | 11 |
| Stabæk | 6 | 6 | 8 | 9 | 9 | 11 | 9 | 10 | 10 | 12 | 11 | 9 | 7 | 8 | 7 | 7 | 9 | 11 | 11 | 11 | 11 | 9 | 11 | 11 | 11 | 11 | 11 | 11 | 10 | 12 |
| Brann | 8 | 13 | 10 | 14 | 14 | 15 | 13 | 13 | 13 | 13 | 13 | 13 | 15 | 13 | 12 | 12 | 12 | 12 | 12 | 12 | 12 | 12 | 12 | 12 | 12 | 12 | 13 | 13 | 13 | 13 |
| Hønefoss BK | 12 | 16 | 16 | 16 | 16 | 16 | 16 | 16 | 16 | 15 | 15 | 15 | 14 | 15 | 14 | 14 | 14 | 14 | 14 | 14 | 14 | 13 | 14 | 14 | 14 | 14 | 14 | 14 | 14 | 14 |
| Kongsvinger | 12 | 15 | 15 | 15 | 15 | 14 | 15 | 15 | 14 | 14 | 14 | 14 | 13 | 14 | 15 | 15 | 15 | 15 | 15 | 15 | 15 | 15 | 15 | 15 | 15 | 15 | 15 | 15 | 15 | 15 |
| Sandefjord | 12 | 9 | 12 | 12 | 12 | 13 | 14 | 14 | 15 | 16 | 16 | 16 | 16 | 16 | 16 | 16 | 16 | 16 | 16 | 16 | 16 | 16 | 16 | 16 | 16 | 16 | 16 | 16 | 16 | 16 |

Source: rsssf.no

== Relegation play-offs ==
At the end of the season, Sandefjord and Kongsvinger were relegated directly to 1. divisjon, and were replaced by Sogndal and Sarpsborg who were directly promoted.

Four teams entered a play-off for the last Tippeligaen spot in the 2011 season. These were:

- A) Hønefoss (by virtue of being the 14th placed team in the Tippeligaen)
- B) Fredrikstad (by virtue of being the third placed team in the 1. divisjon)
- C) Løv-Ham (by virtue of being the fourth placed team in the 1. divisjon)
- D) Ranheim (by virtue of being the fifth placed team in the 1. divisjon)

First round
14 | Hønefoss (a.e.t.) | 2
5 | Ranheim | 1
3 | Fredrikstad | 2
4 | Løv-Ham | 0

Final round
14 | Hønefoss | 1 | 0 | 1
3 | Fredrikstad | 4 | 4 | 8

== Results ==
| Home \ Away | AAL | SKB | HAU | HØN | KIL | LSK | MFK | ODD | RBK | SF | STB | IKS | SIF | TIL | VIF | VIK |
|---|---|---|---|---|---|---|---|---|---|---|---|---|---|---|---|---|
| Aalesund | — | 3–1 | 2–1 | 1–3 | 2–0 | 3–0 | 0–0 | 2–3 | 1–1 | 2–2 | 2–2 | 2–0 | 3–1 | 2–0 | 1–0 | 3–1 |
| Brann | 2–1 | — | 0–0 | 3–2 | 3–1 | 1–1 | 1–1 | 1–1 | 2–3 | 3–2 | 2–2 | 3–4 | 4–0 | 0–1 | 1–1 | 3–3 |
| Haugesund | 2–1 | 1–1 | — | 5–1 | 3–0 | 3–3 | 1–2 | 3–0 | 0–0 | 2–0 | 2–1 | 4–2 | 2–2 | 0–0 | 2–0 | 4–0 |
| Hønefoss BK | 0–2 | 2–0 | 0–2 | — | 1–2 | 3–2 | 1–1 | 2–1 | 0–2 | 1–0 | 0–4 | 0–0 | 1–1 | 2–2 | 3–1 | 0–1 |
| Kongsvinger | 1–2 | 0–3 | 0–1 | 3–3 | — | 0–0 | 3–1 | 1–2 | 0–0 | 1–0 | 1–2 | 3–3 | 0–2 | 1–1 | 1–2 | 1–1 |
| Lillestrøm | 1–0 | 3–2 | 1–1 | 6–0 | 2–2 | — | 1–1 | 2–2 | 1–2 | 4–0 | 0–0 | 3–2 | 3–1 | 2–0 | 1–4 | 1–1 |
| Molde | 2–1 | 3–2 | 2–1 | 1–0 | 2–0 | 3–3 | — | 0–0 | 1–2 | 0–0 | 1–0 | 1–2 | 3–2 | 2–3 | 0–1 | 2–2 |
| Odd Grenland | 2–1 | 0–0 | 4–1 | 1–0 | 0–0 | 2–1 | 1–1 | — | 1–3 | 5–0 | 2–3 | 2–1 | 2–0 | 1–1 | 1–2 | 2–1 |
| Rosenborg | 2–2 | 3–0 | 4–3 | 3–0 | 4–0 | 0–0 | 3–1 | 1–1 | — | 1–0 | 2–0 | 3–3 | 3–0 | 1–0 | 3–1 | 1–1 |
| Sandefjord | 0–1 | 1–4 | 0–1 | 6–1 | 0–1 | 0–1 | 3–1 | 1–1 | 1–3 | — | 1–1 | 1–2 | 0–3 | 3–5 | 0–1 | 0–0 |
| Stabæk | 2–1 | 2–1 | 0–0 | 0–1 | 4–2 | 2–1 | 4–3 | 0–3 | 1–2 | 2–1 | — | 3–0 | 1–2 | 0–1 | 1–1 | 2–3 |
| Start | 1–0 | 3–1 | 3–3 | 2–0 | 3–0 | 2–3 | 1–1 | 1–1 | 2–3 | 2–0 | 3–2 | — | 4–2 | 1–1 | 5–3 | 1–1 |
| Strømsgodset | 3–1 | 1–1 | 2–1 | 4–1 | 2–0 | 5–4 | 1–3 | 0–4 | 1–1 | 4–2 | 1–3 | 3–1 | — | 2–1 | 1–0 | 2–1 |
| Tromsø | 0–1 | 0–3 | 2–0 | 2–0 | 1–0 | 0–0 | 0–1 | 3–1 | 0–0 | 2–1 | 3–0 | 1–0 | 2–1 | — | 2–1 | 1–0 |
| Vålerenga | 3–0 | 1–0 | 5–2 | 0–0 | 5–2 | 2–1 | 2–1 | 6–1 | 0–0 | 3–0 | 3–2 | 8–1 | 4–1 | 3–0 | — | 2–0 |
| Viking | 1–3 | 4–0 | 1–0 | 4–0 | 3–1 | 0–0 | 4–1 | 3–1 | 1–2 | 0–0 | 2–0 | 2–2 | 3–1 | 1–1 | 3–4 | — |

Source: NIFS (in Norwegian)
Legend: Blue = home team win; Yellow = draw; Red = away team win.

== Season statistics ==
=== Top scorers ===
| Rank | Scorer | Club | Goals |
|---|---|---|---|
| 1 | (Senegal) Baye Djiby Fall | Molde | 16 |
| 2 | (Norway) Mohammed Abdellaoue | Vålerenga | 15 |
| 3 | (Norway) Steffen Iversen | Rosenborg | 14 |
| 3 | (Norway) Petter Vaagan Moen | Brann | 14 |
| 3 | (Nigeria) Anthony Ujah | Lillestrøm | 14 |
| 6 | (Sweden) Rade Prica | Rosenborg | 13 |
| 7 | (Norway) Tor Hogne Aarøy | Aalesund | 12 |
| 7 | (Serbia) Nikola Đurđić | Haugesund | 12 |
| 7 | (Jamaica) Luton Shelton | Vålerenga | 12 |
| 7 | (Norway) Ole Martin Årst | Start | 12 |
| 11 | (Norway) Thomas Sørum | Haugesund | 11 |
| 12 | (Iceland) Veigar Páll Gunnarsson | Stabæk | 10 |
| 12 | (Norway) Erik Huseklepp | Brann | 10 |

Source: NRK Sport

=== Discipline ===
==== Player ====
- Most yellow cards: 9
  - (Iceland) Kristján Örn Sigurðsson (Hønefoss)
- Most red cards: 1
  - 23 players

==== Club ====
- Most yellow cards: 47
  - Brann
- Most red cards: 3
  - Molde
  - Vålerenga

=== Attendances ===
| Pos | Team | Total | High | Low | Average | Change |
|---|---|---|---|---|---|---|
| 1 | Rosenborg | 253,577 | 21,474 | 13,903 | 16,905 | −4.2% |
| 2 | Brann | 205,887 | 17,231 | 12,009 | 13,726 | −13.7% |
| 3 | Vålerenga | 204,688 | 18,004 | 10,588 | 13,646 | +26.5% |
| 4 | Viking | 172,942 | 14,283 | 9,939 | 11,529 | −11.8% |
| 5 | Aalesund | 152,195 | 10,778 | 9,500 | 10,146 | −0.7% |
| 6 | Molde | 126,192 | 11,140 | 7,302 | 8,413 | +5.6% |
| 7 | Start | 125,789 | 10,933 | 6,412 | 8,386 | +1.2% |
| 8 | Stabæk | 122,228 | 11,807 | 6,661 | 8,149 | −14.0% |
| 9 | Odd Grenland | 99,406 | 9,200 | 5,463 | 6,627 | −10.1% |
| 10 | Lillestrøm | 98,626 | 7,444 | 4,760 | 6,575 | −13.5% |
| 11 | Strømsgodset | 87,849 | 7,444 | 4,760 | 5,857 | +9.4% |
| 12 | Tromsø | 70,438 | 7,024 | 3,640 | 4,696 | −9.3% |
| 13 | Haugesund | 69,912 | 5,000 | 4,056 | 4,661 | +74.8%^{1} |
| 14 | Sandefjord | 64,957 | 6,936 | 1,142 | 4,330 | −25.4% |
| 15 | Hønefoss | 49,695 | 4,489 | 2,438 | 3,313 | +79.4%^{1} |
| 16 | Kongsvinger | 41,616 | 4,850 | 1,542 | 2,774 | +43.2%^{1} |
| | League total | 1,945,997 | 21,474 | 1,142 | 8,108 | −9.6% |

Source: nifs.no
Notes:
1: Team played last season in 1. divisjon.

== Awards ==
=== Annual awards ===
==== Goalkeeper of the Year ====
The Goalkeeper of the Year awarded to (Denmark) Anders Lindegaard (Aalesunds)

==== Defender of the Year ====
The Defender of the Year awarded to (Norway) Tom Høgli (Tromsø)

==== Midfielder of the Year ====
The Midfielder of the Year awarded to (Ghana) Anthony Annan (Rosenborg)

==== Striker of the Year ====
The Striker of the Year awarded to (Norway) Mohammed Abdellaoue (Vålerenga)

==== Coach of the Year ====
The Coach of the Year awarded to (Norway) Jostein Grindhaug (Haugesund)
