= Bjarte Flem =

Norwegian footballer (born 1958)

Personal information
- Date of birth: 30 March 1958 (age 68)
- Position: Goalkeeper

Senior career*
| Years | Team | Apps | (Gls) |
| 1983 | Lillestrøm | 1 | (0) |
| 1986–1989 | Tromsø | 87 | (0) |
| 1990 | Fyllingen | 3 | (0) |
| 1991 | Tromsø | 1 | (0) |
| Total | | 92 | (0) |
- * Club domestic league appearances and goals

Bjarte Flem (born 30 March 1958) is a Norwegian former footballer who played as a goalkeeper. He played for the Norwegian football club Tromsø, as well as Lillestrøm and Fyllingen.

He was immortalized for his mistake during a match against Sogndal in 1988, which was shown live on the only television station at the time. As Flem was about to throw the ball to a defender on his own team, he threw the ball into his own goal instead. While he was swinging his arm to throw the ball, he changed his mind when he figured out that his teammate was man-marked, resulting in that he let the ball go when he was aiming towards his own goal. The incident made the front pages of national newspapers the next day, and was shown on television in countries across the globe. In Norway, the name Bjarte Flem has become eponymous for a goalkeeper making a huge mistake.

Even though Bjarte Flem mainly will be remembered for his mistake, he was also a good goalkeeper, who enjoyed many good seasons in Tromsø before he retired. Two years before the incident, Tromsø played in the Norwegian Cup Final and won their second Norwegian Cup Championship, with Flem as their goalkeeper.

Before his footballing career he worked as a fisherman, and returned to this job later.
