= Tromsø IL =

Norwegian association football club

Tromsø
- Full name: Tromsø Idrettslag
- Nickname: Gutan (The Boys)
- Founded: 15 September 1920; 106 years ago
- Ground: Romssa Arena
- Capacity: 6,691
- Chairman: Stig Bjørklund
- Manager: Jørgen Vik
- League: Eliteserien
- 2025: Eliteserien, 3rd of 16
- Website: www.til.no
Home colours	Away colours

Tromsø Idrettslag (Northern Sami: Romssa Valáštallansearvi) is a Norwegian professional football club based in Tromsø. They play their home games at the Romssa Arena which has a seating capacity of 6,801. Tromsø play in the Eliteserien.

Despite never winning the Eliteserien title, they have finished as runner-up in 1990 and 2011. They have won the Norwegian Cup twice: in 1986 and 1996, and were runner-up in 2012. Their wins make them the northernmost football club in the world to have won a national title. Tromsø has competed in several UEFA competitions: the UEFA Cup Winners' Cup, UEFA Intertoto Cup, and UEFA Europa League.

== History ==
=== 1920–1939: The pre-war years ===
The club was founded on 15 September 1920, and given the name Tromsø Turnforenings Fotballag (Tromsø Gymnastics Association's Football Team), or Turn for short. The first match after the formal foundation was against cross-town rivals IF Skarp, a 0–0 draw. However, it would not take long before success came to Turn, and in 1927, the club won its first district championship.

In 1930, the club changed its name to Tromsø Idrettslag because the Norwegian Sports Association thought the club's name was too close to the name of Tromsø Gymnastics Association. However, this was only temporary, and the club changed its name to Tor in 1931. 1931 would also be the year the club won its first Northern Norwegian Cup, the highest possible achievement for a Northern Norwegian club at the time. The club beat Mo IL 3–1 in the final. The year after, the Norwegian Sports Association ruled the club could not be named Tor, and so Tromsø Idrettslag was again chosen, this time permanently. Tromsø also won its second district championship in 1932, but was eliminated in the semi-finals of the Northern Norwegian Cup. The 1930s proved to be a good decade for Tromsø, as the club won district championships in 1933, 1936 and 1937. However, sports activities came to an end in 1940 because of World War II, and the club did not play again before 1945.

=== 1945–1969: Two Northern-Norwegian cup championships ===
Tromsø started the post-war years in a good fashion, winning the club's sixth district championship in 1946. In 1949, Tromsø won its second Northern Norwegian cup. This time, the final match was played at Harstad Stadium, and Tromsø were to play FK Bodø/Glimt. Tromsø won 3–1, just like in 1931.

Tromsø then won five consecutive district championships between 1950 and 1954, before the club was introduced into the Norwegian league system (Northern Norwegian clubs could still not be promoted to the top division, however). The club's third and last Northern Norwegian cup came in 1956. Tromsø met Harstad IL – the champions of the previous three years – in Harstad, making Harstad the favourites. However, Tromsø won the match 2–0.

Clubs from Northern Norway were allowed into the Norwegian cup in 1963, and Tromsø participated for the first time in 1964, advancing to the second round after beating FK Mjølner. The club was eliminated in the second round by Nidelv IL. The 1960s were also a period of stadium expansions for the club, with both Valhall Stadium and Alfheim Stadium getting grass fields. Because of the inclusion of Northern Norwegian clubs in the Norwegian Cup, the Northern Norwegian Cup was eventually dropped. Tromsø played its last Northern Norwegian Cup match in 1969.

=== 1970–1985: Build-up for the top division ===
With Northern Norwegian clubs accepted in the cup, the only thing left to be included in was the top division. This occurred in 1972, when FK Mjølner moved to the 1. divisjon. However, at the time, Tromsø was fighting in the bottom of the Northern Norwegian 2nd division (Until 1979, the 2. divisjon was divided in three different groups, two southern and one northern – with the winners of the southern groups being promoted to the top division, while the winner of the northern group would have to face the 2nd placed teams of the two southern groups), and was eventually relegated. In 1975, Tromsø would be back in the 2. divisjon after winning promotion the year before. However, the club was once more relegated, this time after only one season in the second highest level of the league system. Tromsø was back in the 2. divisjon in 1978, and won it this time. However, the qualification matches against the two southern teams Hamarkameratene and Fredrikstad FK were lost 3–0 and 1–0 respectively. The next year, 1979, marked the first year with an all-Norwegian 2. divisjon, giving equal chances for all teams, regardless of geographical position. Tromsø did not do too well and was again relegated.

Tromsø was immediately promoted back to the 2. divisjon after not losing a single match in the 3. divisjon in 1980. Then followed relegation in 1981 and promotion in 1982, before the club finally managed to establish itself in the 2nd division. Two decent seasons in 1983 and 1984 were followed by a second-place finish in 1985, which meant the club would again play qualification matches for the top division. First, Sogndal were beaten 1–0. Then, Tromsø won the decisive match against Moss FK 1–0, after a legendary penalty kick save by goalkeeper Bjarte Flem. Tromsø became the third and, for the time being, latest Northern Norwegian club to qualify for the top division, the other two being FK Mjølner and FK Bodø/Glimt.

=== 1986–2001: 16 years in the top division ===
The first season in the top division would be very hard for Tromsø, the club eventually had to play qualification to survive. The club was highly successful in the cup the same year, however, beating top division champions Lillestrøm SK 4–1 in the final match, a match that had been thought to be a walk in the park for Lillestrøm before it was played.

An experiment in the 1987 season proved valuable to Tromsø: tied matches would be decided on penalty shootouts, awarding three points for a win, two for a shootout win, one for a shootout loss and zero for a loss. Thanks to Bjarte Flem's exceptional penalty saves, Tromsø won seven out of nine shootouts this year. The experiment was dropped after the season. However, the system with three points for a victory was kept. In 1988, Tromsø ended fifth in the league, the season of Bjarte Flems' infamous own goal.

The 1989 and 1990 seasons would become the two most successful top division seasons to date, with Tromsø winning a bronze and a silver medals, respectively. The club's coach during this time, Tommy Svensson, would eventually coach the Sweden national team to a bronze medal in the 1994 FIFA World Cup.

The following seasons saw Tromsø end sixth, eighth, sixth and seventh (all safe mid-table positions) before the expansion of the Norwegian top flight from 12 to 14 teams in 1995, when Tromsø again ended sixth.

In 1996, ten years after the club's first cup championship, Tromsø would again qualify for a cup final. This time, the opponents were FK Bodø/Glimt, which made the final match historical, the first time in history two Northern Norwegian clubs would play each other in a cup final. This also meant that the club winning the match would have bragging rights as the best club in Northern Norway. Tromsø eventually won the match, after a late 2–1 goal by Sigurd Rushfeldt in his last match before leaving for Rosenborg BK. The 1996 cup championship was the club's last championship to date. Tromsø also ended 5th in the league.

1997 did not go too well for Tromsø, and after earning only two points during the last seven matches of the season, the club ended 12th in the league and had to play qualification matches to survive. The opponents were Eik-Tønsberg, and Tromsø won 4–0 and 2–1, which meant Tromsø would still be in the top division. Another poor season followed in 1998, but Tromsø avoided qualification matches this time, ending 11th in the league. 1999 saw Tromsø back in the mid-table sections when the club won sixth place, scored 70 goals, and became the first (and only) Northern Norwegian club to have the top scorer of the top division with Rune Lange's 23 goals. Tromsø then had one of its best seasons ever in 2000, finishing fourth in the league.

In 2001, Tromsø was relegated from the top division for the first time in history. After two very strong opening wins, the club went on a seven-match losing streak where not a single goal was scored. Tromsø eventually ended last, scoring only 23 goals in 26 matches.

=== 2002–present: Second spell in the top division ===
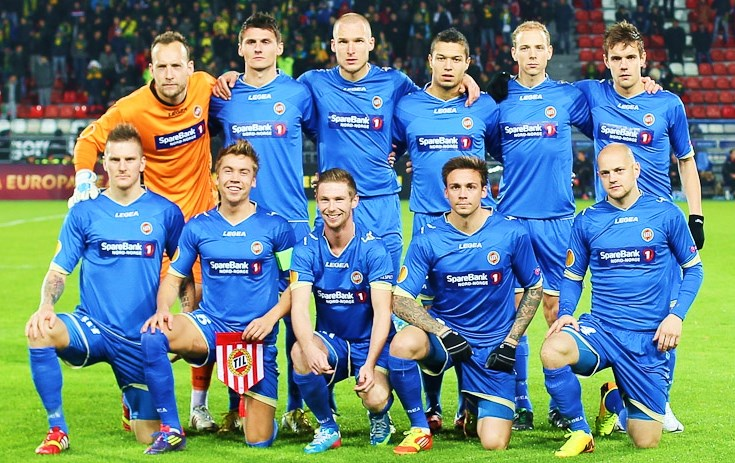
Tromsø IL

Tromsø won the 1. divisjon in 2002, and was thus immediately re-introduced into the top division.

Tromsø is the Norwegian top division club that has since 2000 had the highest coach turnover: Terje Skarsfjord (who coached the club during its 1996 cup championship), Tommy Svensson (who made a brief return to the club in 2001 to save it from relegation, after a ten years absence from the club for the Sweden national team), Trond Johansen, Per Mathias Høgmo, Otto Ulseth, Steinar Nilsen and Ivar Morten Normark.

The 2003 season looked as if Tromsø would return to the first division, but they rescued their place in the Tippeligaen by scoring a winning goal three minutes into injury time in the season's final match against league champions Rosenborg BK. The arrival of Per Mathias Høgmo before the 2004 season proved to be a success; Tromsø had another good season and finished fourth in the league, which qualified them for the Royal League and, as a result of third-placed team SK Brann's victory in the cup that year, the UEFA Cup. After his first successful year, Høgmo opted to forego extending his contract and his former assistant Otto Ulseth was promoted to head coach.

The disappointing 2005 season start had Ulseth sacked after only 15 league matches, all the while Tromsø was struggling to avoid relegation. The head coach for the remainder of the season became Ulseth's former assistant Steinar Nilsen, who managed to turn Tromsø's poor form around. After a club record five consecutive victories, Tromsø secured its place in the Tippeligaen with a 1–0 home win over Viking FK in the second-last matchday of the season. Tromsø also had the top scorer of the top division for the second time in history, as Ole Martin Årst finished the season with 16 goals. The club finished the season in eighth place.

The relegation of FK Bodø/Glimt meant Tromsø were the only team from Northern Norway in the 2006 season. Before the 2006 season, following Steinar Nilsen's resignation, Ivar Morten Normark was made the new Tromsø manager. After a rather unsatisfactory start to the season, Tromsø began negotiating to terminate the contract with Normark on 26 July 2006. Until a new coach could be found, former assistant Agnar Christensen acted as head coach. On 4 August, Normark and Tromsø reached an agreement, meaning Normark would leave the club. On 11 August, Steinar Nilsen was appointed coach signing a three-and-a-half-year contract with the club. Nilsen managed to save Tromsø from relegation once more, leading the club to a tenth-place finish.

Since the end of 2007, Tromsø enjoyed domestic success, with the club finishing inside the league's top four on five occasions since the 2008 season. This meant the Tromsø would regularly take part in the qualification rounds for the UEFA Europa League. Built mainly on a strong home record, Tromso finished third in both the 2008 and 2010 seasons, before going one better the next season and finishing runners-up in the 2011 Tippeligaen, five points behind the Champions Molde FK. After a fourth-placed finish in the 2012 season, Tromsø finished 15th at the end of a disappointing 2013 Tippeligaen and were relegated to the 1. divisjon. Spending most of the season in the bottom half of the table, Tromsø finished second last on 29 points, four points from safety. Tromsø were relegated to the 2014 1. divisjon, Norway's second tier, before gaining promotion straight back into the top-tier by finishing the season in second place with 59 points, ten points behind champions Sandefjord.

== Honours ==
=== League ===
- Eliteserien
  - Runners-up (2): 1990, 2011
  - Third place (5): 1989, 2008, 2010, 2023, 2025
- 1. divisjon
  - Winners (2): 2002, 2020
  - Play-off winners (1): 1985
- 3. divisjon
  - Winners (2): 1980, 1982
  - Play-off winners (3): 1970, 1974, 1977

=== Cups ===
- Norwegian Cup
  - Winners (2): 1986, 1996
  - Runners-up (1): 2012
- Northern Norwegian Championship
  - Winners (3): 1931, 1949, 1956
  - Runners-up (2): 1937, 1952

== Recent history ==
Season	League	Pos.	Pl.	W	D	L	GS	GA	P	Cup	Other competitions		Notes
2011	Tippeligaen	2	30	15	8	7	56	34	53	Fourth round	Europa League	Second qualifying round	
2012	Tippeligaen	4	30	14	7	9	45	32	49	Final	Europa League	Play-off round	
2013	Tippeligaen	↓ 15	30	7	8	15	41	50	29	Fourth round	Europa League	Group stage	Relegated to 1. divisjon
2014	1. divisjon	↑ 2	30	18	5	7	67	27	59	Third round	Europa League	Second qualifying round	Promoted to Tippeligaen
2015	Tippeligaen	13	30	7	8	15	36	50	29	Second round			
2016	Tippeligaen	13	30	9	7	14	36	46	34	Quarter-final			
2017	Eliteserien	11	30	10	8	12	42	49	38	Fourth round			
2018	Eliteserien	10	30	11	3	16	41	48	36	Fourth round			
2019	Eliteserien	↓ 15	30	8	6	16	39	58	30	Third round			Relegated to 1. divisjon
2020	1. divisjon	↑ 1	30	19	6	5	60	29	63	Cancelled			Promoted to Eliteserien
2021	Eliteserien	12	30	8	11	11	33	44	35	Second round			
2022	Eliteserien	7	30	10	13	7	46	49	43	Quarter-final			
2023	Eliteserien	3	30	19	4	7	48	33	61	Fourth round			
2024	Eliteserien	13	30	9	6	15	34	44	33	Third round	Conference League	Third qualifying round	
2025	Eliteserien	3	30	18	3	9	50	36	57	Third round			
2026 (in progress)	Eliteserien	6	27	12	7	8	46	42	43	Fourth round			

== European merits ==
=== 1980s ===
Tromsø first played in a European competition in 1987, following the 1986 cup victory. That time, Tromsø IL met Scottish side St Mirren in the first round of the European Cup Winners' Cup. St Mirren won 1–0 in Scotland and drew 0–0 in Tromsø.

=== 1990s ===
In 1991, Tromsø IL would try their luck in Europe again, this time in the UEFA Cup. Tromsø met Austrian side Tirol Innsbruck in the first round. A 2–1 loss in Austria (after Stein Berg Johansen had given Tromsø a very early lead after 30 seconds) and a 1–1 tie at home (after a goal by Bjørn Johansen) were the results, meaning Tromsø were again eliminated early.

In 1995, Tromsø participated in the now-defunct UEFA Intertoto Cup, which was played during the summer before the European season starts and gives qualification to the UEFA Cup for the best teams of the tournament. Tromsø played in Group 3, along with Aarau, Germinal Ekeren, Havnar Bóltfelag and Universitatea Cluj. The first match was an away match against Aarau, which ended 2–2. Tromsø then proceeded to beat Havnar Bóltfelag 10–0 at home and Universitatea Cluj 1–0 away. Before the last group match, which was at home to Germinal Ekeren, Tromsø were on top of the group, and a victory would ensure Tromsø's advancement to the knockout-stage of the UEFA Intertoto Cup. However, Tromsø lost 2–0 and eventually finished third in the group.

In 1997, the club would again play in the Cup Winners' Cup. In the first round, Croatian side NK Zagreb won 3–2 at home. Tromsø IL were down 3–0, but goals by Bjørn Johansen and Ole Martin Årst gave Tromsø a good result before the home match. The return match in Tromsø ended 3–2, as well, but this time in favour of Tromsø. Rune Lange scored the first goal, but Zagreb equalized before half time. The score was 2–2 after 90 minutes (Ole Martin Årst scored the second goal for Tromsø), and Zagreb looked like they would advance to the second round. However, one minute into injury time, Svein Morten Johansen scored, and extra time would have to be played. Five minutes into the second period, Rune Lange scored the winning goal for Tromsø. It was a historic win, as it was not only the first time Tromsø managed to win a match in a European cup, but also the first time Tromsø managed to qualify for the second round of a European cup. In the second round of the Cup Winners' Cup, Tromsø would play Chelsea. Tromsø defeated Chelsea 3–2 in the home match (after goals by Steinar Nilsen, Frode Fermann and Ole Martin Årst), which became infamous for the heavy amounts of snow that fell during the match. However, the return match did not go well for Tromsø, who eventually lost 7–1 (9–4 on aggregate). Bjørn Johansen scored Tromsø's only goal in London.

=== 2000s ===
In 2005, Tromsø would again play in the UEFA Cup, following their fourth-place finish in the Norwegian top division the year prior. Tromsø won the first qualification match against Esbjerg fB with 1–0 away after a goal by Lars Iver Strand, the club's first ever win in an away match in a European cup. Esbjerg won the return leg in Tromsø 1–0, and penalties were needed to decide a winner. Tromsø only converted two of their five initial penalties (Runar Normann and Ole Andreas Nilsen scored), but since Esbjerg also missed three penalties, the teams had to shoot a sixth penalty. Stephen Ademolu scored while Lars Hirschfeld saved Esbjerg fB's penalty, and Tromsø advanced.

Tromsø drew Galatasaray in the first round of the UEFA Cup. Tromsø won 1–0 at home after a goal by Tamas Szekeres in the 77th minute, in a match filled with mud, rain and snow. Tromsø tied Galatasaray 1–1 at the feared Ali Sami Yen Stadium, thanks to many important saves by Lars Hirschfeld and a goal in the first half from a shot by Patrice Bernier via Stephen Ademolu. Tromsø thus advanced to the group stage of the cup. This result was seen by many as a huge upset, and some Tromsø fans and players immediately declared it a historic win, likening it to the 1996 Norwegian cup championship and the 1985 promotion.

Tromsø lost the first group match, a home game against Roma. The final score was 2–1, and Ole Martin Årst scored Tromsø's goal. The second match saw Tromsø lose again, 2–0 away to Strasbourg. Tromsø won their third match, 3–1 at home against Red Star Belgrade. Benjamin Kibebe scored the first goal, while Årst scored the two last goals. Tromsø lost the last match, against Basel, 4–3, and were subsequently knocked out of the UEFA Cup. Lars Iver Strand scored twice and Årst once. The club ended last in its group.

Tromsø got off to a good start in the 2009–10 UEFA Europa League, playing 0–0 away to Dinamo Minsk and then winning 4–1 at home (after two goals by Tommy Knarvik, one by Morten Moldskred, and one own goal) in the second qualifying round. Tromsø played Slaven Belupo in the third qualifying round, marking the second time in history Tromsø played a Croatian club in a European cup. They won 2–1 at Alfheim, after Slaven scored late in the first half. Two goals in the second half within two minutes, the second by a lightly hurt Sigurd Rushfeldt, they won at home, and after 0–2 away, at a tricky home stadium, two goals by Rushfeldt (in the 14th and 81st minutes) won their way and win into the third and last qualifying round of the European league 2009. Now, they will play against one of the historically most successful clubs in Spain, Athletic Bilbao. Sigurd Rushfeldt has played in the Spanish league as a first targeter. Athletic won the first leg in Bilbao 3–2, including one goal from a controversial penalty when the Bilbao player appeared to dive. Another controversial penalty, this time awarded by French referee Tony Chapron, ended Tromsø's chances, as they drew the home leg 1–1 and lost 3–4 on aggregate – two of the four goals coming from controversial penalty decisions.

=== 2010s ===
Following the third-place finish in the 2010 Tippeligaen season, Tromsø participated in the Europa League, entering in the first qualifying round of the 2011–12 season. Tromsø's first tie was against Latvian club Daugava, which was won comfortably 7–1 on aggregate after winning 5–0 away and 2–1 at home. In the second round, Tromsø were eliminated by Hungarian side Paks.

Tromsø participated in the 2012–13 UEFA Europa League for the second consecutive year, after finishing second in the league in 2011. Tromsø entered the second qualifying round, drawing Slovenian side Olimpija Ljubljana, winning the tie 1–0 on aggregate after a goal in extra time by Miika Koppinen in the second leg in Tromsø. They then advanced past Metalurh Donetsk of Ukraine in the third qualifying round after a 1–1 draw at home and snatching a rare 1–0 away victory. In the play-off round, Tromsø lost to Partizan. After winning the first match in Tromsø (3–2), Tromsø lost 1–0 in Belgrade and were eliminated on away goals.

Tromsø participated in the 2013–14 UEFA Europa League as Norway's fair play winner. Tromsø started qualification in the first qualifying round. After beating Celje, Inter Baku and Differdange, Tromsø lost 3–2 on aggregate to Beşiktaş in the play-off round. Tromsø's conquerors, Beşiktaş, were then disqualified from the competition by the Court of Arbitration for Sport, meaning Tromsø would replace the Turkish side in the group stage. After being reinstalled back into the competition the Norwegians were drawn in Group K alongside Tottenham Hotspur, Anzhi Makhachkala and Sheriff Tiraspol. Tromsø finished bottom of the group, losing both home and away to Anzhi and Tottenham. Tromsø recorded their only point of the campaign in a 1–1 draw against Sheriff at the Alfheim Stadion.

=== Royal League ===
Tromsø also participated in the first Royal League, which was played in late 2004 and early 2005. Despite playing fairly well, Tromsø ended last in their group, and were eliminated from the cup early.

=== European matches ===
Tromsø's goals are listed first.

Season	Competition	Round	Opponents		Home Leg	Away Leg	Aggregate	Goal scorers
1987–88	Cup Winners' Cup	1st	(Scotland)	St Mirren	0–0	0–1	0–1	
1991–92	UEFA Cup	1st	(Austria)	Swarovski Tirol	1–1	1–2	2–3	SB Johansen, B Johansen
1995	Intertoto Cup	Group 3	(Switzerland)	Aarau	—N/a	2–2	3rd 7 pts. +9 GD	Flo, S. B. Johansen
1995	Intertoto Cup	Group 3	(Faroe Islands)	HB	10–0	—N/a	3rd 7 pts. +9 GD	Hafstad (2), Flo (3), Swift (3) S. B. Johansen (2)
1995	Intertoto Cup	Group 3	(Romania)	Universitatea Cluj	—N/a	1–0	3rd 7 pts. +9 GD	SB Johansen
1995	Intertoto Cup	Group 3	(Belgium)	Ekeren	0–2	—N/a	3rd 7 pts. +9 GD	
1997–98	Cup Winners' Cup	1st	(Croatia)	NK Zagreb	4–2	2–3	6–5	B. Johansen, Årst (2), Lange (2), S. M. Johansen
1997–98	Cup Winners' Cup	2nd	(England)	Chelsea	3–2	1–7	4–9	Nilsen, Fermann, Årst, B. Johansen
2005–06	UEFA Cup	2nd Q	(Denmark)	Esbjerg	0–1	1–0	1–1 (3–2 p)	Strand
2005–06	UEFA Cup	1st	(Turkey)	Galatasaray	1–0	1–1	2–1	Szekeres, Ademolu
2005–06	UEFA Cup	Group E	(Italy)	Roma	1–2	—N/a	5th 3 pts. –2 GD	Årst
2005–06	UEFA Cup	Group E	(France)	Strasbourg	—N/a	0–2	5th 3 pts. –2 GD	
2005–06	UEFA Cup	Group E	(Serbia and Montenegro)	Red Star Belgrade	3–1	—N/a	5th 3 pts. –2 GD	Kibebe, Årst (2)
2005–06	UEFA Cup	Group E	(Switzerland)	Basel	—N/a	3–4	5th 3 pts. –2 GD	Strand (2), Årst
2009–10	Europa League	2nd Q	(Belarus)	Dinamo Minsk	4–1	0–0	4–1	Knarvik (2), Moldskred, own goal
2009–10	Europa League	3rd Q	(Croatia)	Slaven Belupo	2–1	2–0	4–1	Moldskred, Rushfeldt (3)
2009–10	Europa League	Play-off	(Spain)	Athletic Bilbao	1–1	2–3	3–4	Moldskred, Lindpere, Rushfeldt
2011–12	Europa League	1st Q	(Latvia)	Daugava	2–1	5–0	7–1	R Johansen, Andersen (2), Yttergård Jenssen, Mo, Møller, own goal
2011–12	Europa League	2nd Q	(Hungary)	Paks	0–3	1–1	1–4	Andersen
2012–13	Europa League	2nd Q	(Slovenia)	Olimpija Ljubljana	1–0	0–0	1–0	Koppinen
2012–13	Europa League	3rd Q	(Ukraine)	Metalurh Donetsk	1–1	1–0	2–1	Ondrášek, Prijović
2012–13	Europa League	Play-off	(Serbia)	Partizan	3–2	0–1	3–3 (1–2 a)	Prijović, Björck, Kara
2013–14	Europa League	1st Q	(Slovenia)	Celje	1–2	2–0	3–2	Koppinen, Andersen, Moldskred
2013–14	Europa League	2nd Q	(Azerbaijan)	Inter Baku	2–0	0–1	2–1	Ondrášek, Andersen
2013–14	Europa League	3rd Q	(Luxembourg)	Differdange 03	1–0	0–1	1–1 (4–3 p)	Ondrášek
2013–14	Europa League	Play-off	(Turkey)	Beşiktaş	2–1	0–2	2–3	Bendiksen, Pritchard
2013–14	Europa League	Group K	(England)	Tottenham Hotspur	0–2	0–3	4th 1 pt. –9 GD	
2013–14	Europa League	Group K	(Russia)	Anzhi Makhachkala	0–1	0–1	4th 1 pt. –9 GD	
2013–14	Europa League	Group K	(Moldova)	Sheriff Tiraspol	1–1	0–2	4th 1 pt. –9 GD	Ondrášek
2014–15	Europa League	1st Q	(Estonia)	Santos Tartu	6–1	7–0	13–1	Andersen (4), J Johansen, Moldskred, Drage (2), Norbye, Johnsen, Espejord, Wangberg (2)
2014–15	Europa League	2nd Q	(Faroe Islands)	Víkingur Gøta	1–2	0–0	1–2	Wangberg
2024–25	Conference League	2nd Q	(Finland)	KuPS	1−0	1−0	2−0	Hjertø-Dahl, Nordås
2024–25	Conference League	3rd Q	(Scotland)	Kilmarnock	0–1	2–2	2–3	Romsaas (2)
2026–27	Europa League	2nd Q	(Czech Republic)	Hradec Králové	0–1	1–3	1–4	Åsen Larsen
2026–27	Conference League	3rd Q	(Romania)	CFR Cluj	2–1	5–0	7–1	Åsen Larsen (2), Dahlqvist (3), Hien, Vådebu
2026–27	Conference League	Play-off	(England)	Brighton & Hove Albion	0-0	0-4	0-4	

On 30 August 2013, Beşiktaş was disqualified from the 2013–14 UEFA Europa League as per final ruling by the Court of Arbitration for Sport. They were replaced in the group stage draw by Tromsø, which had lost to Beşiktaş in the play-off round.

== Players ==
=== Current squad ===
As of 5 September 2026

Note: Flags indicate national team as defined under FIFA eligibility rules; some limited exceptions apply. Players may hold more than one non-FIFA nationality.

No.	Pos.	Nation	Player
1	GK	DEN	Jakob Haugaard
3	DF	NOR	Mathias Tønnessen
4	DF	NOR	Vetle Skjærvik
5	MF	SWE	David Edvardsson
7	FW	NOR	Lars Olden Larsen
8	MF	NOR	Jesper Grundt
9	FW	NOR	Daniel Braut
10	MF	NOR	Troy Nyhammer
11	MF	NOR	Ruben Yttergård Jenssen (captain)
12	GK	NOR	Ole Kristian Lauvli
14	MF	NOR	Sigurd Prestmo
15	FW	NOR	Vegard Erlien
16	DF	NOR	Benjamin Myrvold
17	MF	SWE	Isak Dahlqvist

No.	Pos.	Nation	Player
18	FW	NOR	Nikolay Jakobsen Hristov
19	MF	NOR	Aleksander Lilletun Elvebu
21	DF	SWE	Leon Hien (on loan from Djurgården)
22	MF	NOR	Heine Åsen Larsen
24	DF	NGR	Vince Osuji
25	DF	NOR	Casper Øyvann
27	MF	NOR	Mads Mikkelsen
29	DF	SWE	Alexander Warneryd
30	DF	NOR	Isak Vådebu
32	GK	NOR	Øystein Norheim
33	DF	GAM	Musa Jatta
37	MF	NOR	Sander Innvær
70	MF	NOR	Morten Bjørlo

For season transfers, see List of Norwegian football transfers winter 2025–26, and List of Norwegian football transfers summer 2026.

=== Out on loan ===
Note: Flags indicate national team as defined under FIFA eligibility rules; some limited exceptions apply. Players may hold more than one non-FIFA nationality.

No.	Pos.	Nation	Player
20	FW	CPV	Ieltsin Camões (at Śląsk Wrocław until 30 June 2027)
92	MF	NOR	Johan Solstad-Nøis (at Lyn until 31 December 2026)
—	GK	MTN	Abderrahmane Sarr (at Raufoss until 31 December 2026)

No.	Pos.	Nation	Player
—	DF	ROU	Filip Oprea (at Åsane until 31 December 2026)
—	FW	SWE	Viktor Ekblom (at Örgryte IS until 31 December 2026)
—	FW	NOR	Sean Nilsen-Modebe (at Lørenskog until 31 December 2026)

=== All-time player stats ===
As of 2 July 2011

- Most goals total: Sigurd Rushfeldt, 140
- Most league goals total: Sigurd Rushfeldt, 95
- Most matches total: Bjørn Johansen, 405
- Most league matches total: Bjørn Johansen, 326

== Staff ==
=== Coaching staff ===
Head coach:	Jørgen Vik
Coach:	Ola Rismo
Sport director:	Lars Petter Kræmer-Andressen
Goalkeeper coach:	Anders Rønning
Physio:	Tom-Erik Richardsen
Physio:	Martin Eidissen
Fitness coach:	Sigurd Pedersen
Kit manager:	Odd Egil Eggen
Security manager:	Hans-Thore Hanssen
Doctor:	Jorid Degerstrøm

=== Administrative staff ===
Chairman	Bjørn Nilsen
Director	Vegard Berg-Johansen
Director of football	Svein-Morten Johansen
Sports controller	Hege Christensen
Venue director	John Werner Larsen
Arrangement director	Christer Olsen
Media director	Brynjar Lorentsen
Marketing director	Trond Steinar Albertsen

=== Managers 1986–present ===
Name	Years
Dagfinn Rognmo	1986
Arne Andreassen	1986–87
Tommy Svensson	1988–90
Bosse Petterson	1991
Per Mathias Høgmo	1992
Arne Andreassen	1992
Truls Jenssen	1992
Harald Aabrekk	1993–95
Terje Skarsfjord	1996
Håkan Sandberg	1997–98

Name	Years
Terje Skarsfjord	1999–01
Tommy Svensson	2001
Trond Johansen	2002–03
Terje Skarsfjord	2003
Per Mathias Høgmo	2004
Otto Ulseth	2005
Steinar Nilsen	2005
Ivar Morten Normark	2006
Agnar Christensen (interim)	2006
Steinar Nilsen	2006–08

Name	Years
Per Mathias Høgmo	2009–12
Agnar Christensen	2013
Steinar Nilsen	2013–2015
Bård Flovik	2015–2017
Truls Jenssen (interim)	2017
Simo Valakari	2017–2020
Gaute Helstrup	2020–2024
Jørgen Vik; Gard Holme	2024
Jørgen Vik	2025–

== Supporters ==
The official supporter club is called Isberget (The Iceberg). Their logo is a polar bear with a football and a red and white striped jersey holding a Tromsø IL scarf. It was founded before the 1996-season and has around 600 members. Members of Isberget can be found in 18 of Norway's 19 counties, with the majority living in and around Tromsø. A subgroup founded in 2004, called Isberget Sør (The Iceberg South), is for supporters living in Østlandet, and organizes trips to Tromsø's away matches in the Østlandet and Sørlandet regions.

Tromsø has a number of songs, with the more famous ones being Heia TIL and the 1996 cup final song, both by Sverre Kjelsberg. The 1996 cup final song is played at Romssa Arena when Tromsø scores a goal. A club fanfare used to be played while the teams entered the pitch during home matches. However, before the 2008 season the NFF decided that all clubs should play Tippeligafanfaren (The Tippeliga Fanfare) when the teams entered the pitch. Tromsø now plays its fanfare before Tippeligafanfaren.
