= Svein Morten Johansen =

Norwegian footballer (born 1971)

Svein Morten Johansen (born 29 May 1971) is a retired Norwegian football defender.

He hails from Tromsdalen and played his entire career in Tromsdalen UIL before joining first-tier club Tromsø IL ahead of the 1992 season. He played for Tromsø until 2003.

Johansen was managing director of Tromsdalen director of sports in Tromsø.
