= Bjørn Johansen (footballer) =

Norwegian footballer (born 1969)

Personal information
- Full name: Bjørn Johansen
- Date of birth: 7 September 1969 (age 57)
- Place of birth: Tromsø, Norway
- Height: 1.86 m (6 ft 1 in)
- Position: Central midfielder

Team information
- Current team: Norway U16–U17 (manager)

Youth career
- Tromsø

Senior career*
Years	Team	Apps	(Gls)
1987–1992	Tromsø	107	(13)
1993–1994	Viking	37	(3)
1995–1999	Tromsø	119	(18)
2000–2001	Helsingborg	41	(5)
2002–2005	Tromsø	100	(10)

International career
1985	Norway U15	5	(0)
1986	Norway U16	2	(0)
1988	Norway U18	2	(1)
1987	Norway U19	1	(0)
1989	Norway U20	6	(1)
1988–1991	Norway U21	15	(0)

Managerial career
- 2011–2017: Finnsnes
- 2018: Fredrikstad (assistant)
- 2019–2022: Fredrikstad
- 2022–2024: Norway U16–U17
- 2025–: Norway U18–U19
- * Club domestic league appearances and goals

Bjørn "Bummen" Johansen (born 7 September 1969) is a former Norwegian footballer, who played as a midfielder for Tromsø IL for most of his career. He is currently a manager.

== Club career ==
Johansen got his debut in 1987, and played for Tromsø until 1992. He moved to Viking in 1993, and stayed there for two seasons. In 1995, Johansen was back at Tromsø, and stayed with the club until 1999, and won the Norwegian Cup with Tromsø in 1996.

Johansen played for the Swedish team Helsingborgs IF between 2000 and 2001, and played for the club in the Champions League, before he again returned to Tromsø, when the club played in the First Division in 2002. and helped the club return to the Norwegian Premier League.

Johansen played for Tromsø between 1989 and 2005, with the exception of his 4 seasons and with his 326 league-games for Tromsø he is the player with the most matches for the club. Johansen also participated in four of Tromsø campaigns in European Cups.

== International career ==
Johansen played international matches for various Norwegian youth international teams, and played for the under-20 team in the 1989 FIFA World Youth Championship. Johansen played 15 matches for Norway U21, but he was never capped for the senior team.

== Coaching career ==
On 19 November 2010, the Third Division side Finnsnes announced that they had hired as head coach from the 2011-season onwards. The club won promotion to the Second Division in Johansen's first season as head coach.

Johansen was the manager of Fredrikstad FK and secured promotion to the 2021 1. divisjon. He was sacked during the 2022 season. He was hired by the Football Association of Norway as head coach of the Norway U16 national team.

== Personal life ==
Johansen got his nickname Bummen by his brother when he was a child.

After Johansen's retirement in 2005, he has worked as a sports commentator for the Norwegian TV 2.

== Honours ==
Individual

- Norwegian First Division Coach of the Month: July 2021
