= Steinar Nilsen =

Norwegian football coach (born 1972)

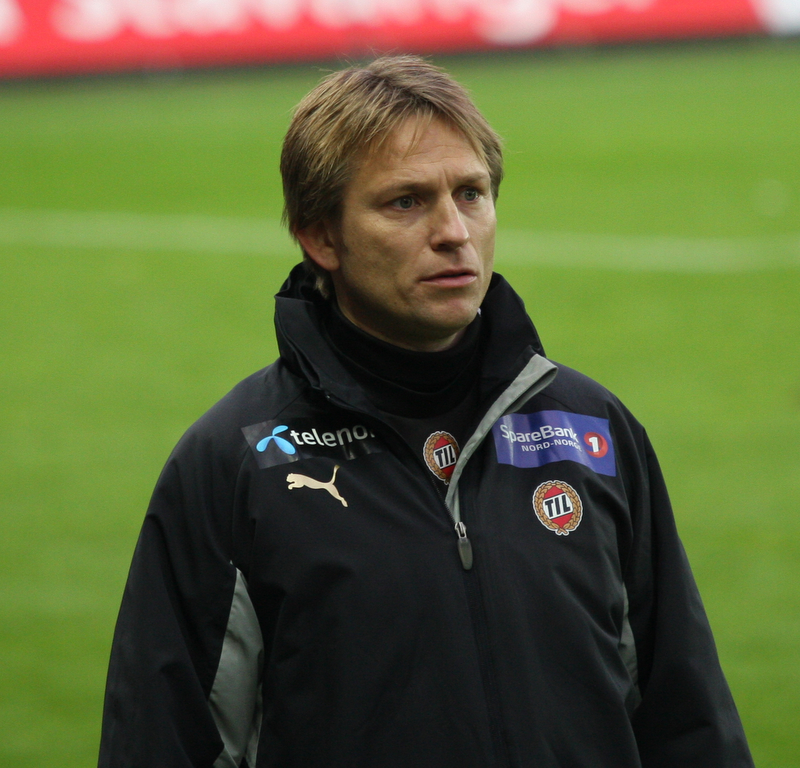

Personal information
- Full name: Steinar Nilsen
- Date of birth: 1 May 1972 (age 54)
- Place of birth: Tromsø, Norway
- Height: 1.80 m (5 ft 11 in)
- Position: Defender

Youth career
- Kvaløysletta

Senior career*
Years	Team	Apps	(Gls)
1989–1997	Tromsø	112	(10)
1997–1998	AC Milan	5	(1)
1998–2002	Napoli	53	(1)
2002–2004	Tromsø	60	(2)

International career
1992–1993	Norway U21	9	(0)
1997–1998	Norway	2	(0)

Managerial career
- 2005: Tromsø
- 2006–2008: Tromsø
- 2009–2010: Brann
- 2013–2015: Tromsø
- 2024: Sandnes Ulf (interim)
- * Club domestic league appearances and goals

Steinar Nilsen (born 1 May 1972) is a Norwegian football coach who has been in charge of Tromsø and Brann in the Norwegian Premier League.

As a player, he played as a central defender at Tromsø and also had a notable stay in Italy's Serie A and Serie B, before retiring in 2004. He won two caps for Norway.

He is the brother of Roger Nilsen.

== Playing career ==
Nilsen played for Tromsø between 1989 and 1997, before he was sold to AC Milan. Nilsen then moved on to SSC Napoli, before returning to Tromsø in 2003.

== Coaching career ==
=== Tromsø ===
After Per Mathias Høgmo resigned his job as head coach of Tromsø in 2005, Nilsen became assistant coach to Otto Ulseth, Høgmo's former assistant. A horrible start to Tromsø's season saw Ulseth fired and Nilsen promoted to head coach. This move was criticised by many Norwegian sports commentators, with some, especially Ivar Hoff, claiming it would assuredly mean Tromsø would be relegated. However, Nilsen turned Tromsø poor form around, and after a good run in the autumn-part of the season, the team avoided relegation. Nilsen also led Tromsø to a historic UEFA Cup victory over Galatasaray, making Tromsø the first Norwegian team (together with Viking) to reach the UEFA Cup's group stage. At the end of the 2005-campaign, Nilsen stepped down from his position as head coach of Tromsø, despite urges from many fans for him to stay longer.

In 2006, following another string of bad results, Tromsø's head coach Ivar Morten Normark was fired and Nilsen once more stepped in as a replacement for the remainder of the season, in hopes that he could save Tromsø from relegation. Nilsen's effect was not as noticeable on the team this time, however, and with four matches left of the season Tromsø I.L. looked like they would almost certainly be relegated. However, a string of three consecutive wins at the end of season put Tromsø in 10th place, meaning Nilsen had once more saved Tromsø from relegation.

In 2007, his first full season as Tromsø-manager, Nilsen led Tromsø to a comfortable 6th-place finish, just a few points shy of European qualification.

=== SK Brann ===
In November 2008 Nilsen signed a three-year contract with Brann, to become the successor of Mons Ivar Mjelde. Under his command, Brann finished 5th in the 2009 Tippeligaen, a step up from an 8th place under Mjelde in 2008.

On 21 May 2010 Nilsen's spell as head coach for Brann ended. He was relieved of his contract after a poor start to the season, including an early exit from the Norwegian Cup.

=== Pundit ===
Recently, Nilsen has worked as a pundit at the Norwegian broadcaster MAX.

In August 2012, Dagbladet named Nilsen a candidate for succeeding Per-Mathias Høgmo at Tromsø after the 2012 season.

=== Tromsø ===
On 16 September 2013 he was signed as Agnar Christensen's assistant coach at Tromsø, but on 1 October he was promoted to head coach when Christensen was sacked, with Nilsen's old teammate Sigurd Rushfeldt becoming the new assistant coach. In December 2013, Tromsø announced that Nilsen had signed a three-year contract as head coach of the club, with a clear ambition of promotion back to Tippeligaen after the 2014 season. And he did, but he lost his job again on 18 August 2015 for reasons undisclosed by the management.
