= Rune Skarsfjord =

Norwegian footballer (born 1970)

Personal information
- Date of birth: 23 May 1970 (age 56)
- Place of birth: Narvik, Norway
- Height: 1.84 m (6 ft 0 in)
- Position: Forward

Senior career*
Years	Team	Apps	(Gls)
- FK Mjølner
- Tromsdalen UIL
1994	Lyn		
1995	Moss		
1996–1998	Fossum IF		
1999	Skjetten SK		
2000	Bærum SK		
2001	Kvik		

Managerial career
- 1996–1998: Fossum IF (player-manager)
- 2000–2003: Rosenborg (youth)
- 2004–2005: Rosenborg (assistant)
- 2006–2008: FK Haugesund
- 2009–2010: Brann (assistant)
- 2010–2013: Brann
- 2014–2015: Hønefoss
- * Club domestic league appearances and goals

Rune Skarsfjord (born 23 May 1970) is a Norwegian football coach and former player. He worked as head coach for FK Haugesund and as an assistant coach for Rosenborg BK. He was promoted to head coach of SK Brann in 2010 after Steinar Nilsen was dismissed.

A forward, (Note: Rune Skarsfjord at WorldFootball.net) he played for FK Mjølner, Tromsdalen UIL, Lyn, Moss, Fossum IF, Skjetten SK and Bærum SK; and after being hired as youth coach in Rosenborg BK he also featured for FK Kvik. (Note: Rune Skarsfjord at the Norwegian Football Federation (in Norwegian))
