= Otto Ulseth =

Norwegian football manager and journalist

Otto Ulseth (born 29 July 1957) is a Norwegian football coach and journalist. Ulseth has worked as sports journalist in Adresseavisen, Dagbladet, and the Norwegian Broadcasting Corporation. As a football coach he has worked as manager of Tromsø IL in 2005 and assistant coach of Iraq's national team from 2007 to 2008. During the 2010 season he was assistant coach of Ranheim Fotball in Norwegian First Division, in a coaching team including Per Joar Hansen and Christer Basma.
