= Agnar Christensen =

Norwegian footballer and manager (born 1969)

Personal information
- Full name: Agnar Hallsten Sjøvoll Christensen
- Date of birth: 5 June 1969 (age 57)
- Place of birth: Norway

Senior career*
Years	Team	Apps	(Gls)
1984–?	Grovfjord IL	324	(?)

Managerial career
- ?–2002: Grovfjord IL
- 2006: Tromsø IL (assistant manager)
- 2006: Tromsø IL (caretaker manager)
- 2006–2012: Tromsø IL (assistant manager)
- 2013: Tromsø IL
- * Club domestic league appearances and goals

Agnar Christensen (born 5 June 1969) is a Norwegian football manager and former player. He is the former manager of Tromsø IL in the Norwegian Premier League.
