= Ole Martin Årst =

Norwegian footballer (born 1974)

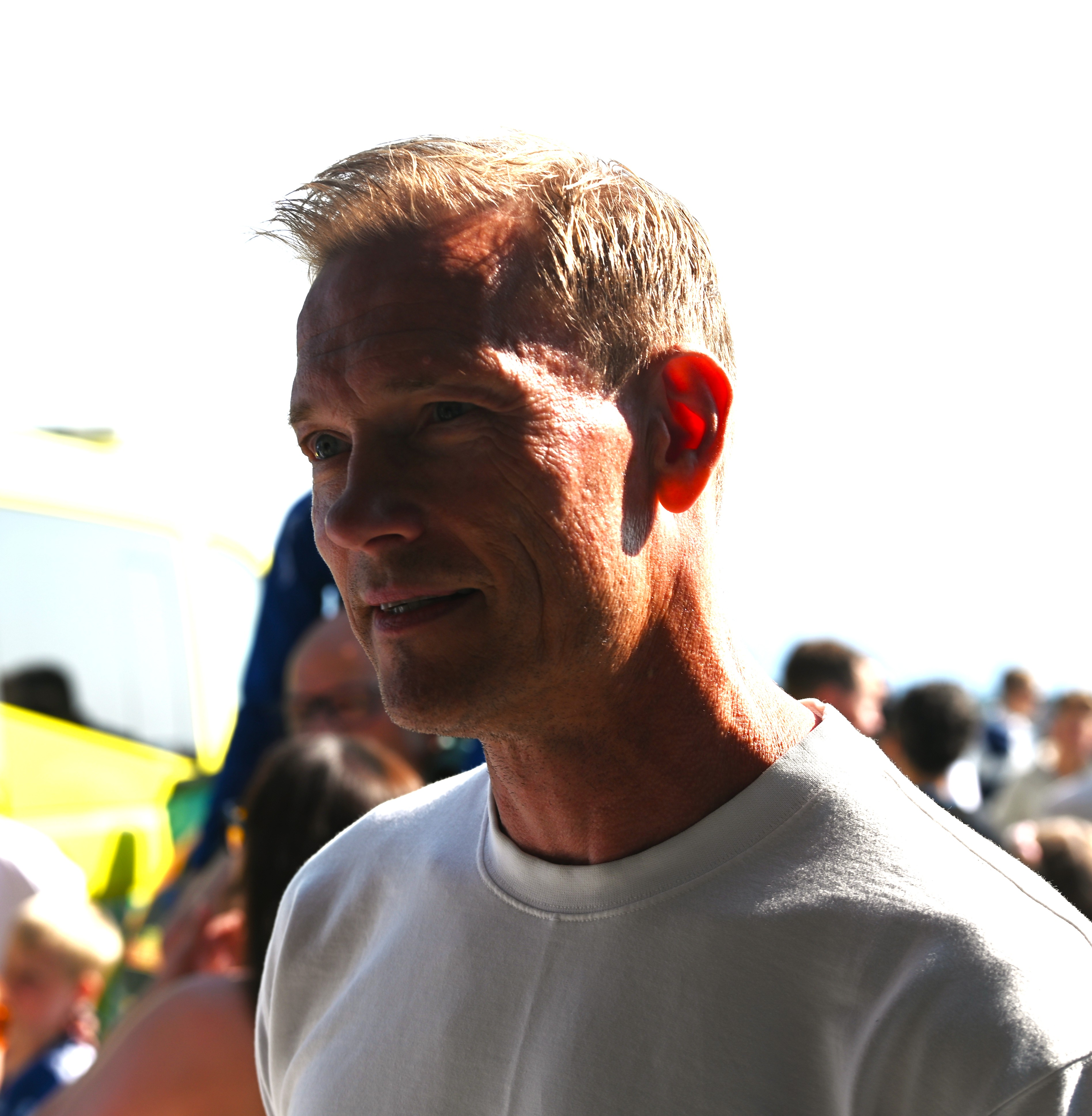
- Årst in 2026

Personal information
- Date of birth: 19 July 1974 (age 52)
- Place of birth: Bergen, Norway
- Height: 1.90 m (6 ft 3 in)
- Position: Forward

Youth career
- Sortland
- Brage/Trondenes
- Fløya
- Tromsø
- Skarp

Senior career*
Years	Team	Apps	(Gls)
1994–1995	Skarp	22	(34)
1995–1997	Tromsø	54	(19)
1997–1999	Anderlecht	36	(11)
1999–2000	Gent	33	(30)
2000–2003	Standard Liège	73	(41)
2003–2007	Tromsø	103	(45)
2007–2011	Start	67	(34)
2012	Tromsø	25	(3)
Total		414	(218)

International career
1995–1996	Norway U21	5	(1)
2000–2007	Norway	22	(2)
- * Club domestic league appearances and goals

Ole Martin Årst (born 19 July 1974) is a Norwegian retired professional footballer who played as a forward. He is a former top scorer in both Belgium's and Norway's top leagues.

== Club career ==
The son of a naval officer, Ole Martin Årst was born in Bergen and spent his childhood years in Harstad and Sortland before settling in Tromsø at age 11. He made his professional debut for Tromsø IL on 22 April 1995 against Hamarkameratene at Briskeby stadion. After the 1997 season he was sold to Anderlecht for 13 million kr. He then moved to K.A.A. Gent in Belgium and became as a top scorer in 2000 with 30 goals. Then Standard Liège signed him for NOK 24 million. He returned to Tromsø IL in the summer of 2003 for 5 million kr.

Årst became the top scorer in the Tippeligaen 2005, with 16 goals. After a hat-trick against IK Start on 2 October 2005 Årst was ranked as the top league scorer of all times in Tromsø IL with 51 goals. On 9 July 2007, he transferred to IK Start.

Start went down that season, but as Start won a direct promotion in 2008, Årst did not participate in any games due to a serious injury. The same injury limited him to only two games in the 2009 season.

He announced his retirement in October 2009.

He made a comeback for the club in a friendly match in early 2010. He then signed a contract for the duration of 2010, with possibilities of renewal.

Årst signed a one-year deal with Tromsø IL ahead of the 2012 Tippeligaen season. This was his third spell at the club.

== International career ==
Årst made his debut for the Norway national team in a January 2000 friendly match against Iceland and went on to earn 22 caps, scoring two goals.

== Career statistics ==
Appearances and goals by club, season and competition
Club	Season	League			Cup		Continental		Total	
Club	Season	Division	Apps	Goals	Apps	Goals	Apps	Goals	Apps	Goals
Skarp	1994	Third division	22	34			–		22	34
Tromsø	1995	Tippeligaen	7	1	3	3	2	0	12	4
Tromsø	1996	Tippeligaen	24	9	8	6	–		32	15
Tromsø	1997	Tippeligaen	23	9	4	5	4	3	31	17
Tromsø	Total		54	19	15	14	6	3	75	36
Anderlecht	1997–98	Belgian Pro League	18	10						
Anderlecht	1998–99	Belgian Pro League	18	1						
Anderlecht	Total		36	11						
Gent	1999–00	Belgian Pro League	32	30						
Standard Liège	2000–01	Belgian Pro League	29	14						
Standard Liège	2001–02	Belgian Pro League	12	6						
Standard Liège	2002–03	Belgian Pro League	30	19						
Standard Liège	Total		71	39						
Tromsø	2003	Tippeligaen	13	5	3	1	–		16	6
Tromsø	2004	Tippeligaen	25	11	3	0	–		28	11
Tromsø	2005	Tippeligaen	26	16	2	2	7	4	35	22
Tromsø	2006	Tippeligaen	26	11	2	2	–		28	13
Tromsø	2007	Tippeligaen	13	2	3	5	–		16	7
Tromsø	Total		103	45	13	10	7	4	123	59
Start	2007	Tippeligaen	12	6	2	0	–		14	6
Start	2008	Adeccoligaen	0	0	0	0	–		0	0
Start	2009	Tippeligaen	2	0	0	0	–		2	0
Start	2010	Tippeligaen	24	12	3	4	–		27	16
Start	2011	Tippeligaen	29	16	6	4	–		35	20
Start	Total		67	34	11	8	0	0	78	42
Tromsø	2012	Tippeligaen	25	3	5	1	3	0	33	4
Career total			410	214						

== Honours ==
Tromsø

- Norwegian Cup: 1996

Individual

- Belgian First Division top scorer: 2000
- Tippeligaen top scorer: 2005
- Kniksen award: striker of the year: 2005
