= Ivar Morten Normark =

Norwegian footballer and manager (born 1963)

Personal information
- Date of birth: 27 May 1963 (age 63)
- Place of birth: Narvik, Norway
- Position: Forward

Senior career*
Years	Team	Apps	(Gls)
1980–1984	Mjølner		
1984–1985	Stade Français	3	(0)
1985–1986	Brann		
1987–1989	Mjølner		
1990–1994	Bodø/Glimt		
1994	Gevir Bodø		

Managerial career
- 1998–2000: Alta
- 2001–2005: Aalesund
- 2006: Tromsø
- 2008–2013: Mjølner
- 2018–: Hødd (chair)
- * Club domestic league appearances and goals

Ivar Morten Normark (born 27 May 1963) is a Norwegian football coach and former player. His most recent head coaching job was at FK Mjølner in the 2. divisjon. Normark resigned from this position at the end of the 2013 season.

Normark led Aalesund to both promotion to, and relegation from the Norwegian Premier League twice. After the last relegation in 2005, Normark was fired from his job, but was quickly snapped up by Tromsø. His stay in Tromsø was not very successful, and on 26 July 2006, he was sacked after only seven months in the manager's chair. In October 2006 he agreed to take over the Sápmi national football team.

As an active player, Normark had his best years at Bodø/Glimt, where he won the Norwegian Cup and silver medals in Tippeligaen in 1993. He also played in the top division for Brann, and for his hometown side Mjølner. He also had a short stay in French football where he played for Stade Français.

In the summer of 1994 he left Bodø/Glimt and joined FK Gevir Bodø, finishing his career there.

Normark is known for his flippant statements in the media. For example, when asked the question of what his ambitions for Aalesund were, Normark replied "world domination".

Normark settled at Ellingsøya in Ålesund Municipality. In 2018 he was elected to chair the board of directors in Hødd.
