= 2021 in Norway =

- Centuries: 19th; 20th; 21st
- Decades: 2000s; 2010s; 2020s
- See also: List of years in Norway

Events in the year 2021 in Norway.

== Incumbents ==
- Monarch – Harald V.
- President of the Storting – Tone Wilhelmsen Trøen (Conservative).
- Prime Minister – Erna Solberg (Conservative).

From 9 October:

- President of the Storting – Eva Kristin Hansen (Labour).

From 14 October:

- Prime Minister – Jonas Gahr Støre (Labour).

From 25 November:

- President of the Storting – Masud Gharahkhani (Labour).

== Events ==
- COVID-19 pandemic in Norway
- 13 September – the 2021 Norwegian parliamentary election.
- 13 September – the 2021 Norwegian Sámi parliamentary election.
- 18 September – Kjell Ingolf Ropstad announces his resignation as Minister of Children and Families and as leader of the Christian Democratic Party.
- 13 October – Five people are killed and three others injured in an attack in Kongsberg.
- 14 October – Støre's Cabinet takes office.
- 9 November – A knife attacker on the streets of Bislett, Oslo, is fatally shot by police.
- 13 November – Olaug Bollestad is formally elected as leader of the Christian Democratic Party, having been acting leader since Kjell Ingolf Ropstad stepped down.
- 19 November – Eva Kristin Hansen announces her withdrawal as President of the Storting. The same day, the police announces they are opening an investigation into possible misuse of commuter apartments by six MPs. The investigation may have included Hansen, although this was later denied to be the case.
- 10 November – Magnus Carlsen wins the World Chess Championship 2021.

=== Sports ===
- 11 February – Halvor Egner Granerud equals Roar Ljøkelsøy to become the winningest Norwegian racer in the FIS Ski Jumping World Cup, with 11 wins.
- 14 February – Ragne Wiklund becomes the first Norwegian woman to win a World Single Distances Speed Skating Championships title.
- 22 February – Casper Ruud was announced as climbing to 24th place on the ATP rankings, the highest rank of any Norwegian, surpassing his own record rank of 25th from September 2020. During the course of 2021, Ruud achieved further all-time high rankings of 22nd, then 16th in May, then 15th and 14th in June, then 12th and 11th in August.
- 25 February – Molde FK knocks Hoffenheim out of the 2020–21 UEFA Europa League, becoming the first Norwegian team in many years to reach the round of 16.
- 27 February – Gyda Westvold Hansen becomes the first ever world champion in women's Nordic combined.
- 7 March – The 2021 World Nordic Ski Championships concludes with Norway atop the medals table, claiming more golds than the second best nation (Austria) did overall medals.
- 21 March – The 2020–21 FIS Nordic Combined World Cup concludes, Jarl Magnus Riiber emerging as the men's winner.
- 21 March – The 2020–21 Biathlon World Cup concludes, Tiril Eckhoff emerging as the women's winner and Johannes Thingnes Bø as the men's winner.
- 28 March – The 2020–21 FIS Ski Jumping World Cup concludes, Halvor Egner Granerud emerging as the men's winner.
- 30 May – Vipers Kristiansand win the 2020–21 Women's EHF Champions League, with Henny Reistad being designated MVP.
- 4 June – Karoline Bjerkeli Grøvdal ran 8:30.84 to beat Grete Waitz' Norwegian record in the 3000 metres, but it is not ratified as a Norwegian record due to the use of a male pacemaker.
- 4 June – Karsten Warholm ran 33.26 to beat his own world best in the 300 metres hurdles.
- 1 July – Karsten Warholm ran 46.70 at the 2021 Bislett Games to beat the world record in the 400 metres hurdles.
- 27 July – As a part of Norway's performance at the 2020 Summer Olympics, Kristian Blummenfelt won the triathlon gold medal as the first Summer Olympic gold for Norway since 2012.
- 2 August – As a part of Norway's performance at the 2020 Summer Olympics, Karsten Warholm won the 400 metres hurdles gold medal in a staggering new world record of 45.94 seconds.
- 7 August – As a part of Norway's performance at the 2020 Summer Olympics, Jakob Ingebrigtsen won the 1500 metres gold medal in a new Olympic and European record of 3:28.32 minutes.
- 29 August – As a part of Norway's performance at the 2020 Summer Paralympics, Salum Kashafali won the T12 100 metres gold medal in a new world record of 10.43 seconds.
- 2–10 October – the 2021 World Wrestling Championships were held in Oslo.
- 4 October – Ballon d'Or winner Ada Hegerberg made her comeback after being sidelined with injury for 20 months.
- 21 October – In the 2021–22 UEFA Europa Conference League group stage, FK Bodø/Glimt thrash AS Roma 6–1 in one of the biggest ever performances of a Norwegian football club in European competition.
- 8–14 November – The 2021 World Powerlifting Championships are held in Stavanger.
- 18 November – Casper Ruud became the first Norwegian to win a tennis match in the ATP Finals, beating Cameron Norrie. Though seeded 8th, Ruud reached the semifinals before succumbing.
- 21 November – Halvor Egner Granerud surpasses Roar Ljøkelsøy to become the winningest Norwegian racer in the FIS Ski Jumping World Cup, with 12 wins.
- 21 December – It is announced that Erik Botheim becomes the most expensive transfer from an Eliteserien club. The initial fee paid by FC Krasnodar is reportedly 80 million kr, 5 million over the previous record of John Carew.

== Anniversaries ==
- 3 April – 250 years since the birth of Hans Nielsen Hauge.
- 7 December – 100 years since the birth of composer and music collector Arne Dørumsgaard.
- 100 years since establishment of the Norwegian Water Resources and Energy Directorate.
- 100 years since the first parliamentary election with plural-member constituencies.

== Deaths ==
=== January ===
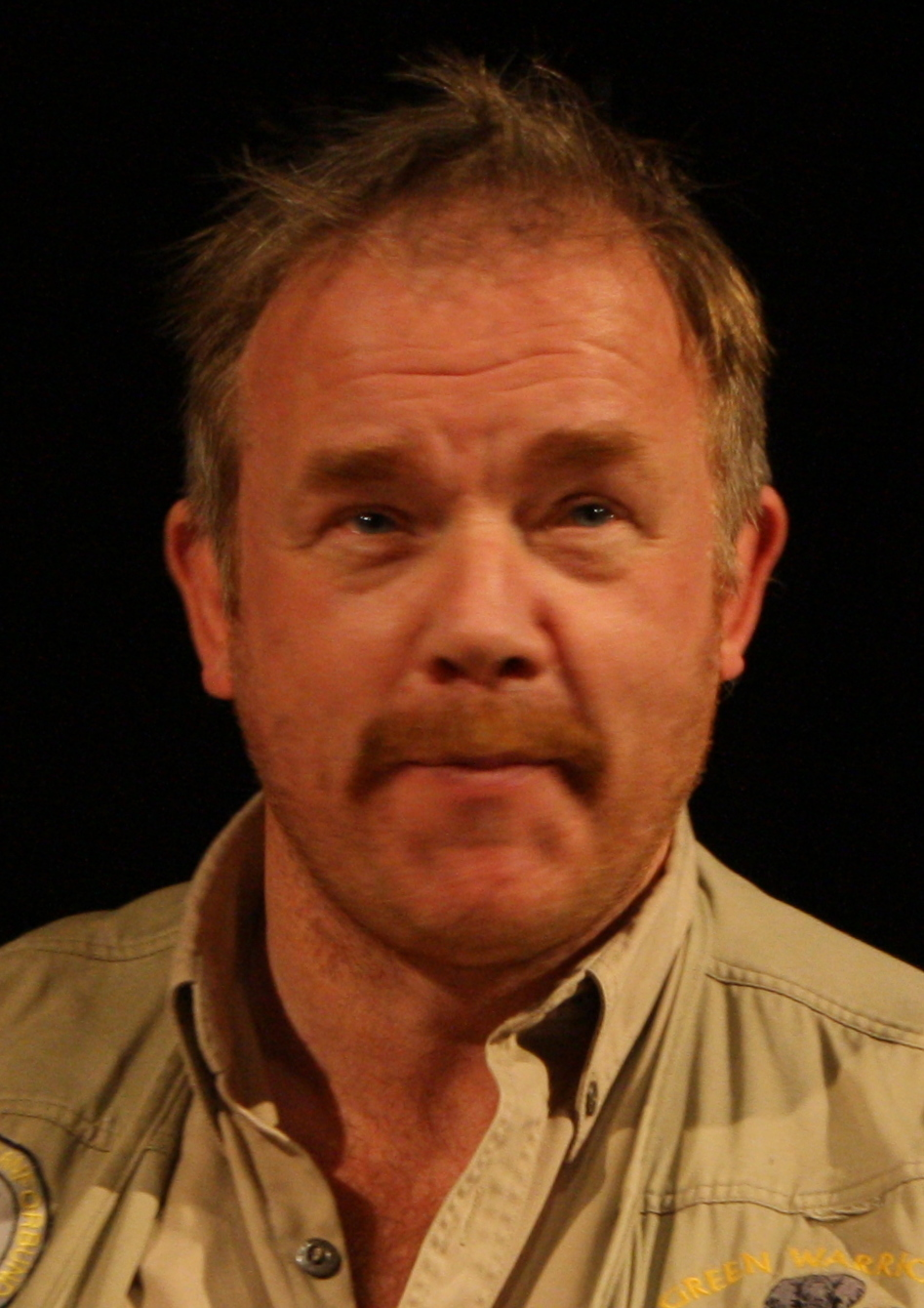
Kurt Oddekalv

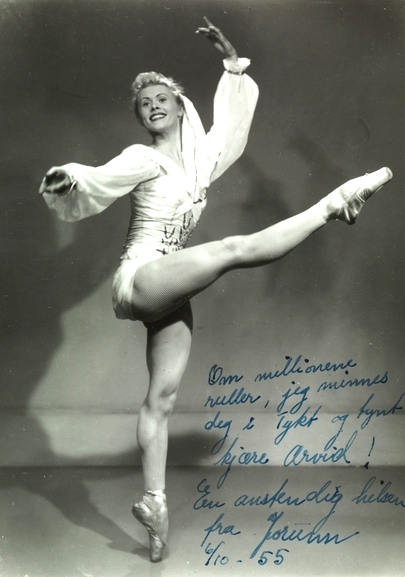
Jorunn Kirkenær

- 1 January – Harald Maartmann, cross-country skier (born 1926).
- 5 January – Annasif Døhlen, sculptor (born 1930).
- 10 January – Kristen K. Flaa, politician (born1925).
- 11 January – Kurt Oddekalv, environmentalist (born 1957).
- 13 January – Øyvind Sandberg, filmmaker (born 1953).
- 15 January – Olav M. Skulberg, limnologist (born 1930).
- 16 January – Einar Eriksen, newspaper editor (born 1933).
- 16 January – Egil Tveterås, encyclopedist (born 1925).
- 21 January – Jorunn Bjørg Giske, politician (born 1927).
- 22 January – Jorunn Kirkenær, ballet dancer and choreographer (born 1926).
- 26 January – Kjersti Døvigen, actress (born 1943).
- 26 January – Berit Oskal Eira, politician (born 1951).
- 28 January – Modolf Aukan, politician (born 1948).
- 28 January – Bjarne Holen, politician (born 1925).
- 27 January – Hans Christen Rønnevik, petroleum geologist (born 1945).

=== February ===
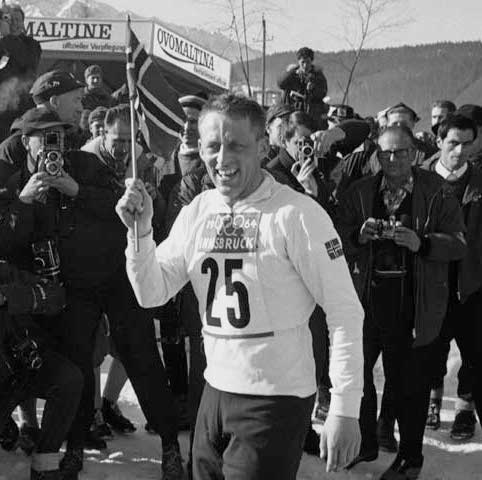
Tormod Knutsen

- 2 February – Frank Tandberg, criminal and novelist (born 1959).
- 4 February – Kirsten Elisabeth Alnæs, social anthropologist (born 1927).
- 5 February – Dag Jostein Fjærvoll, politician (born 1947).
- 6 February – Bodil Skjånes Dugstad, politician (born 1927).
- 7 February – Olav Holt, physicist (born 1935).
- 10 February – Egil Øyjord, engineer (born 1928).
- 13 February – Inger Bjørnbakken, alpine skier (born 1933).
- 14 February – Finn Knutsen, politician (born 1932).
- 23 February – Tormod Knutsen, Nordic combined skier (born 1932).
- 24 February – Rachel Trovi, philanthropist (born 1927).
- 24 February – Jan van de Roemer, speed skater (born 1957).

=== March ===
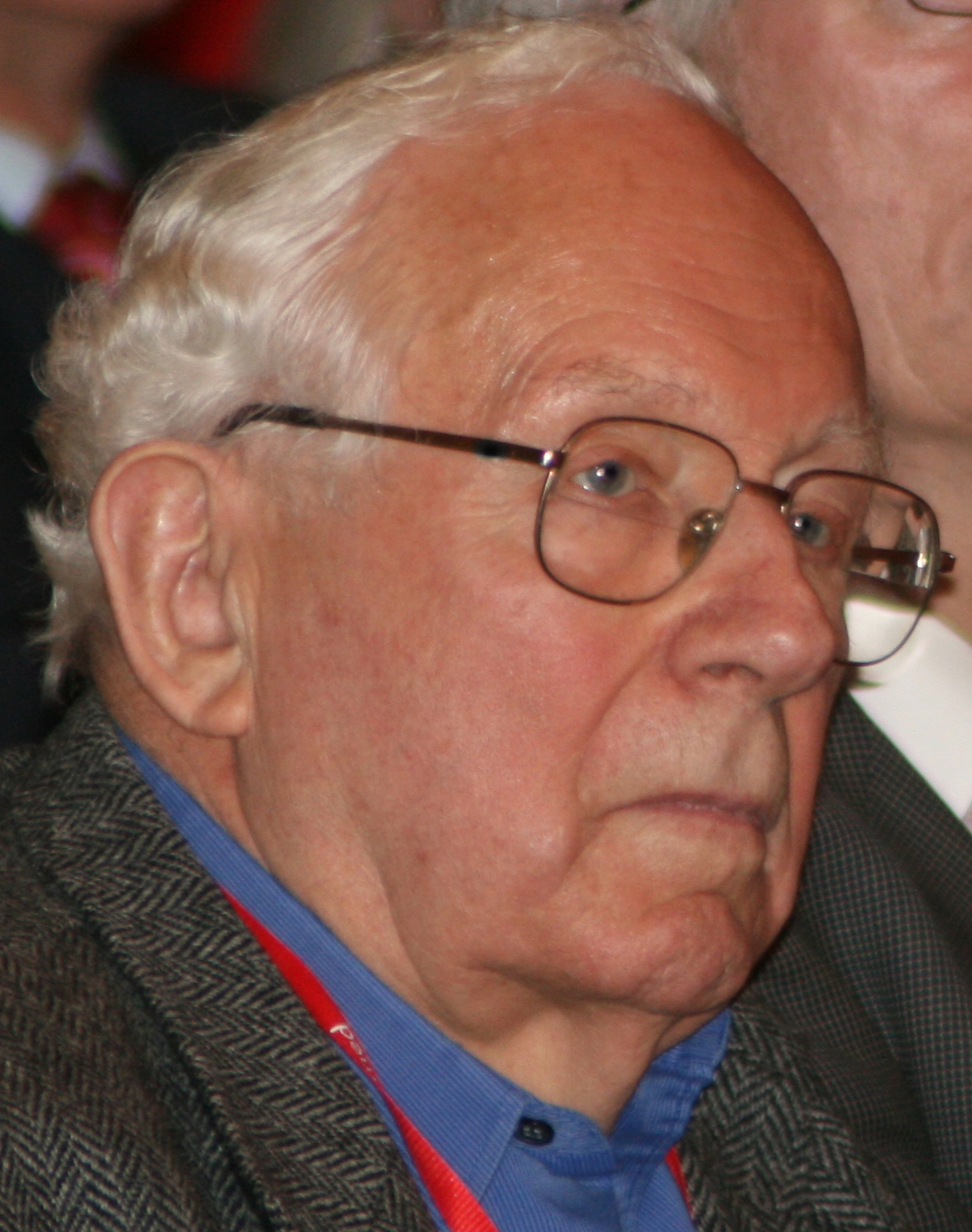
Per Kleppe

- 1 March – Hauk Buen, Hardanger fiddler and fiddle maker (born 1933).
- 2 March – Kari Rasmussen, singer and actress (born 1932).
- 6 March – Egil A. Wyller, philosopher and historian of ideas (born 1925).
- 9 March
  - Hans-Christian Gabrielsen, trade unionist (born 1967).
  - Erling Lorentzen, shipowner and industrialist (born 1923).
- 10 March – Per Kleppe, politician, Minister of Finance (born 1923).
- 19 March – Inger Halvorsen, politician (born 1930).
- 22 March – Lars Tjønnheim, politician (born 1934).
- 23 March – Erik Thorsby, professor of medicine (born 1938).
- 24 March – Kåre Arnstein Lye, biologist (born 1940).
- 28 March – Kjell Risvik, translator (born 1941).
- 28 March – Karen Kleven, politician (born 1925).
- 30 March – Inger-Marie Ytterhorn, politician (born 1941).

=== April ===
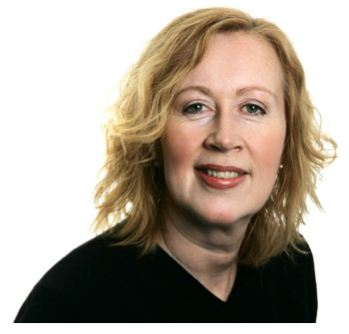
Lotte Sandberg

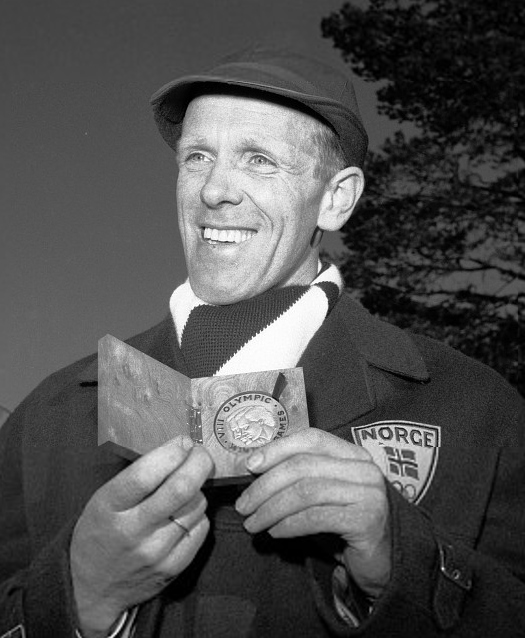
Håkon Brusveen

- 1 April – Morten Harboe, professor of medicine (born 1929).
- 2 April – Jacob Birger Natvig, hospital director (born 1934).
- 4 April – Paul Einar Vatne, editor (born 1941).
- 5 April – Jan-Olav Ingvaldsen, journalist and politician (born 1954).
- 6 April
  - Hans Kristian Gaarder, conspiracy theorist (born 1960).
  - Jon Gjønnes, physicist (born 1931).
- 9 April – Astrid Rødmyr, orienteering competitor (born 1940).
- 10 April – Arthur O. Sandved, philologist (born 1933).
- 11 April – Lotte Sandberg, art historian and journalist (born 1956).
- 12 April – Tor Kjærvik, lawyer (born 1951).
- 15 April – Knut Jøran Helmers, chess player (born 1957).
- 21 April
  - Håkon Brusveen, cross-country skier and sports broadcaster (born 1927).
  - Johan Fredrik Heyerdahl, publisher and secretary general (born 1937).
  - Kari Kemény, translator (born 1950).
- 22 April – Roy Strandbakke, footballer (born 1930).
- 23 April – Hans Rasmus Astrup, ship broker and art collector (born 1939).
- 24 April
  - Kaare Lindboe, football referee (born 1939).
  - Knut Magne Myrland, country singer (born 1948).
  - Siv Nordrum, journalist and politician (born 1958).
- 27 April – Johan Brun, photographer (born 1922).
- 28 April – Karl Ingebrigtsen, politician (born 1935).

=== May ===
- 3 May – Else Michelet, radio presenter (born 1942).
- 9 May – Bruno Oldani, designer (born 1936).
- 14 May – Torkild Brakstad, footballer (born 1945).
- 28 May - Gjert Kristoffersen, phoneticist (born 1949).
- 29 May – Thomas Mathiesen, sociologist (born 1933).
- 30 May – Håvard Tveite, orienteer (born 1962).

=== June ===
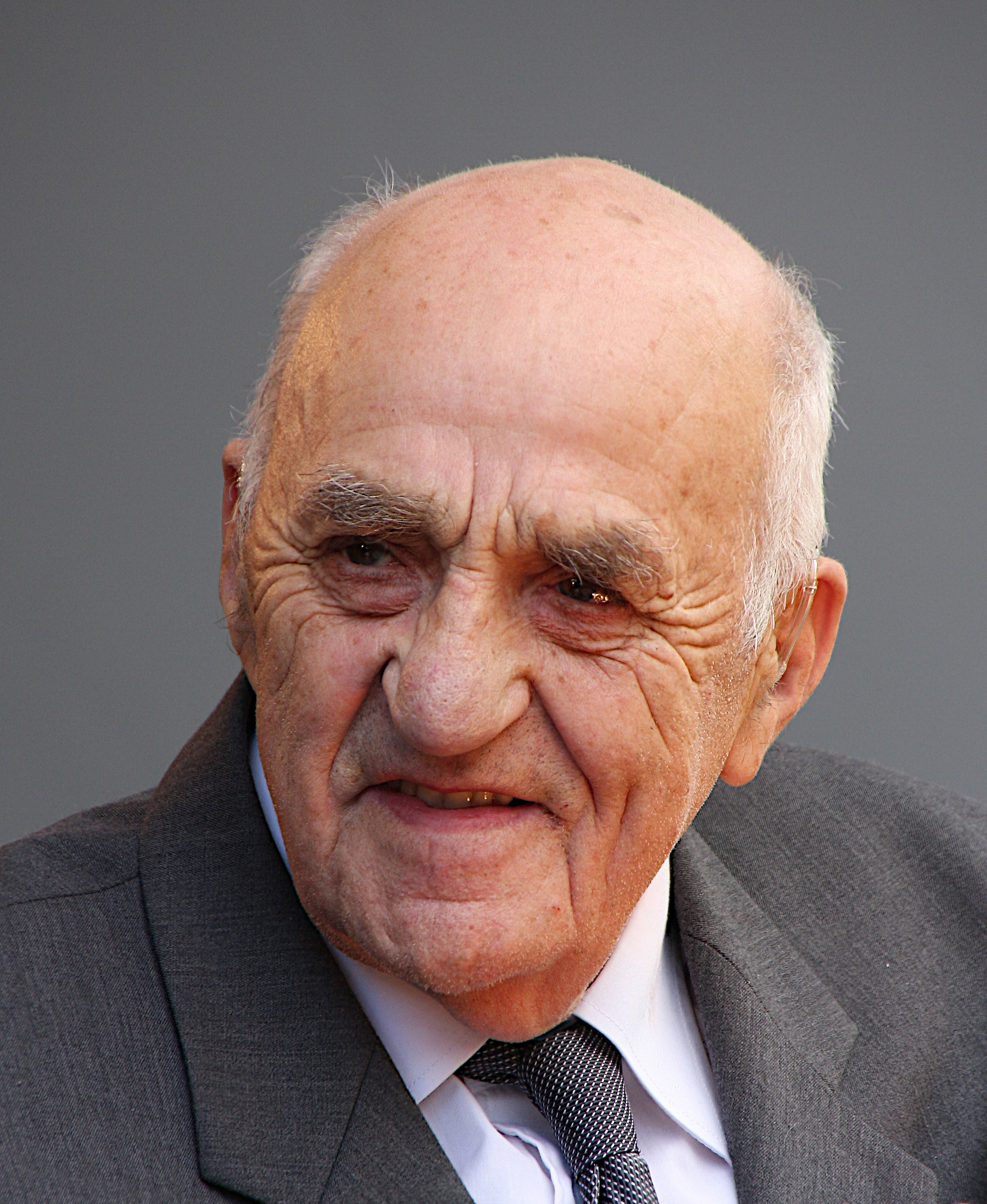
Joralf Gjerstad

- 2 June – Carl Høgset, choral conductor (born 1941).
- 6 June – Rolf Hellem, politician (born 1923).
- 17 June – Halvard Bjørkvik, historian (born 1924).
- 18 June – Joralf Gjerstad, healer (born 1926).
- 22 June – Per Inge Torkelsen, humorist (born 1953).
- 22 June – Audun Dybdahl, historian (born 1944).
- 27 June – Kolbein Falkeid, poet (born 1933).

=== July ===
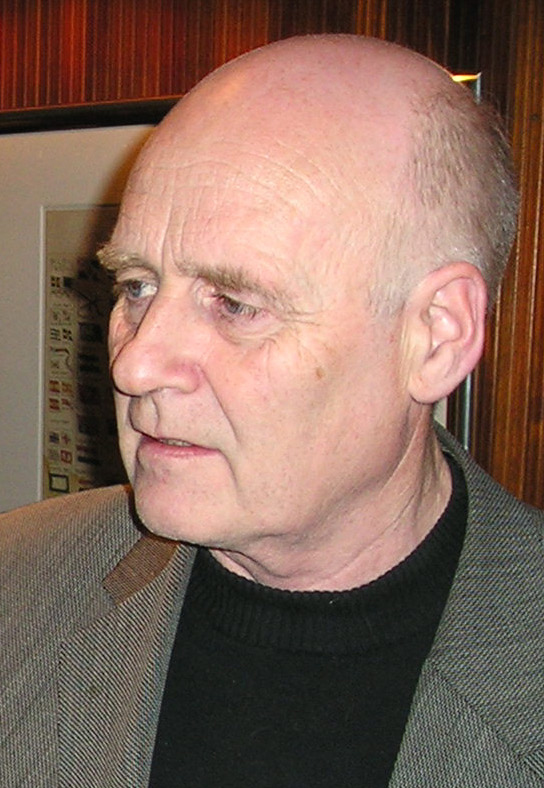
Kåre Gjønnes

- 8 July - Gudrun Nymoen, supercentenarian (born 1910).
- 15 July – Jarle Benum, politician (born 1928).
- 20 July – Alexander Røsler, filmmaker (born 1947).
- 23 July – Mathias Calmeyer, TV series director (born 1964).
- 26 July – Roald Paulsen, footballer (born 1938).
- 26 July – Kåre Gjønnes, politician (born 1942).
- 26 July – Ulla Nævestad, politician (born 1945).
- 27 July – Einar Bruno Larsen, footballer and ice hockey player (born 1939).
- 29 July – Kaare Sandegren, diplomat and trade unionist (born 1929).

=== August ===
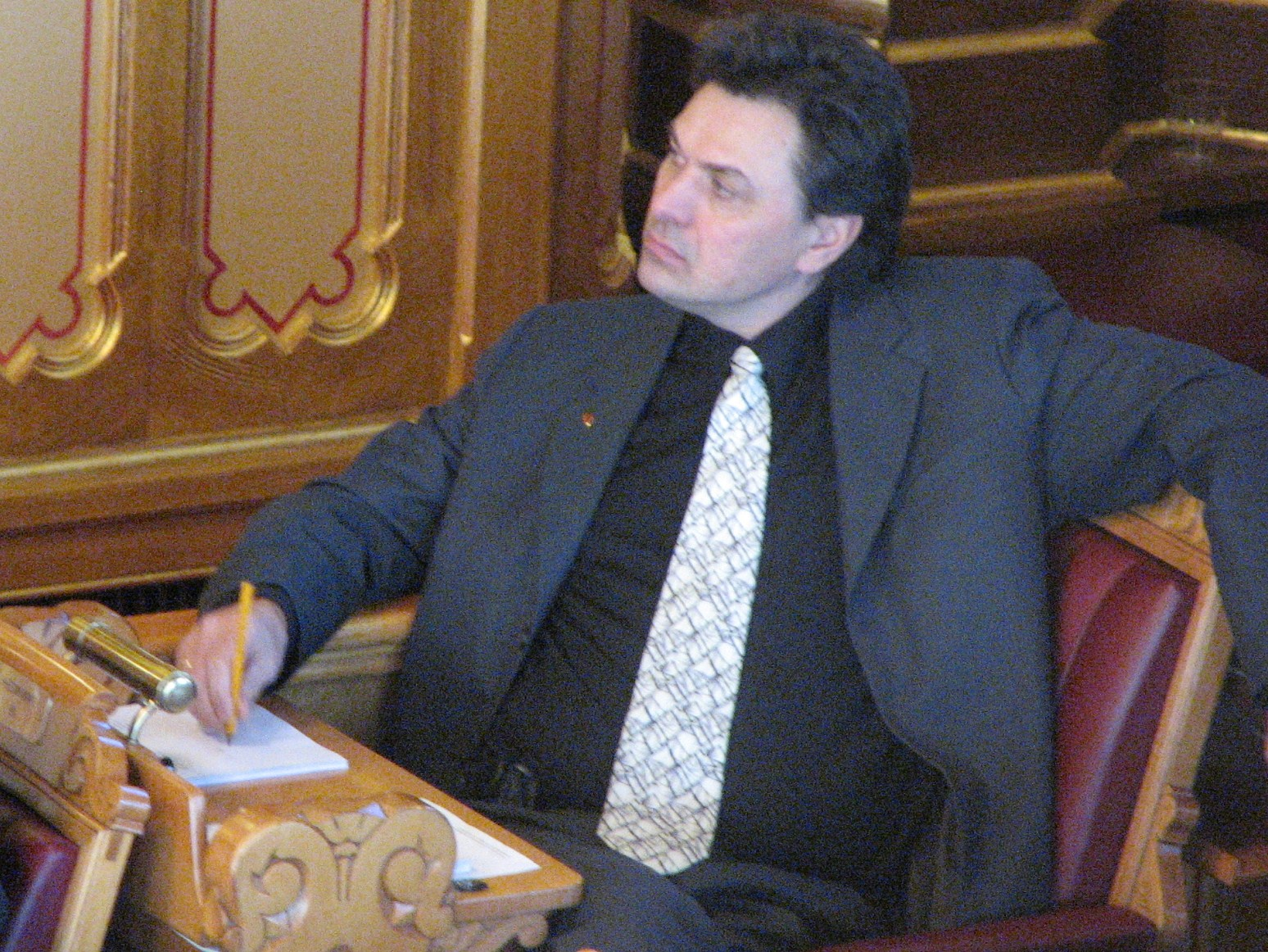
Olav Akselsen

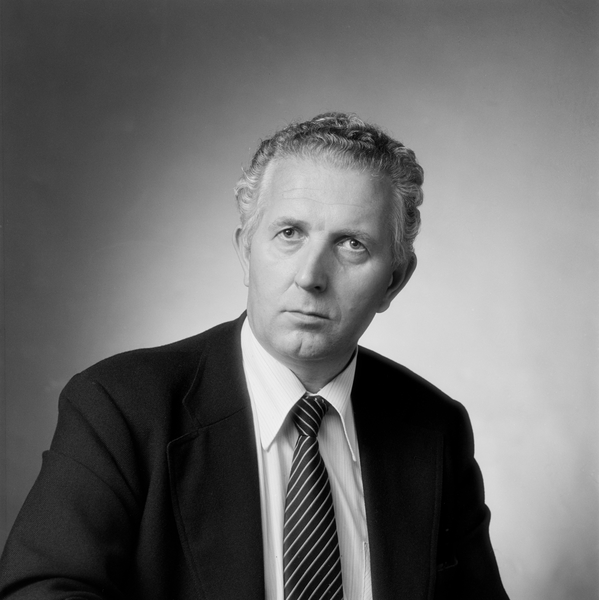
Andreas Norland

- 2 August – Thor Helland, long-distance runner (born 1936).
- 2 August – Elbjørg Fjære, politician (born 1933).
- 2 August – Laila Steindal, politician (born 1932).
- 3 August – Jørgen Langhelle, actor (born 1965).
- 4 August – Oddlaug Vereide, politician (born 1933).
- 5 August – Egil Fossum, newspaper editor (born 1946).
- 6 August – Svein Tang Wa, artist (born 1946).
- 6 August – Jakob Skarstein, radio presenter (born 1921).
- 6 August – Einar Knut Holm, politician (born 1933).
- 7 August – Rolf Erling Andersen, politician (born 1947).
- 13 August – Yngvar Krogh, opera singer (born 1934).
- 16 August – Marit Grønhaug, actress (born 1941).
- 16 August – Olav Akselsen, politician (born 1965).
- 19 August – Trygve Brudevold, bobsledder (born 1920).
- 21 August – Andreas Norland, editor (born 1935).
- 30 August – Bjarne Fiskum, violinist (born 1939).

=== September ===
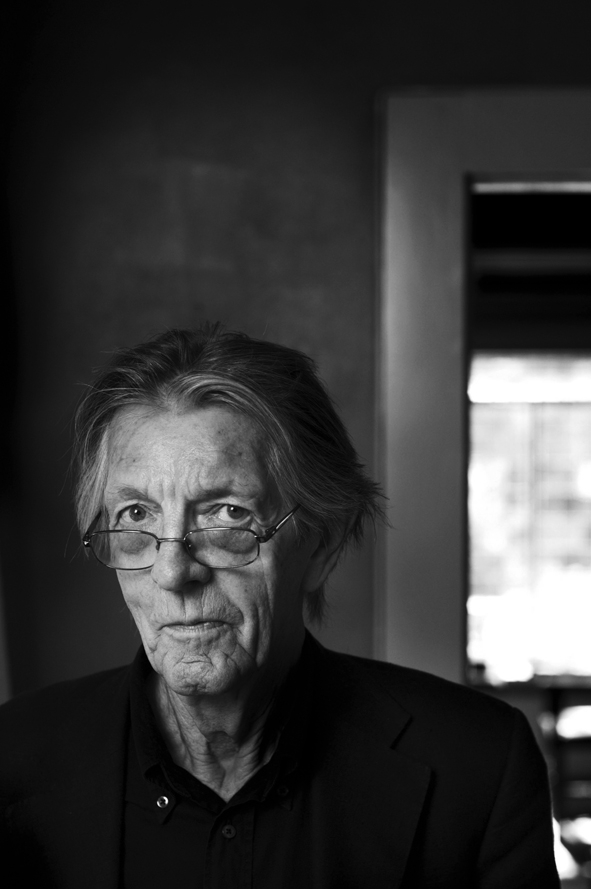
Kjell Askildsen

- 4 September – Rune Gerhardsen, politician (born 1946).
- 7 September – Gunnar Sem, children's writer (born 1932).
- 9 September – Leif Frode Onarheim, businessman and politician (born 1934).
- 13 September – Tom Vraalsen, politician and diplomat (born 1936).
- 16 September – Geir Johnson, composer (born 1953).
- 16 September – Sverre Fornes, footballer (born 1932).
- 18 September – Kristoffer Stensrud, investor (born 1953).
- 18 September – Gudmund Restad, politician (born 1937).
- 19 September – Ole Nordhaug, bishop (born 1925).
- 19 September – Petter Vennerød, film director (born 1948).
- 23 September – Kjell Askildsen, writer (born 1929).
- 23 September – Pål Benum, athlete (born 1935).
- 26 September – Kjersti Holmen, actress (born 1956).
- 27 September – Egil Lillestøl, physicist (1938).

=== October ===
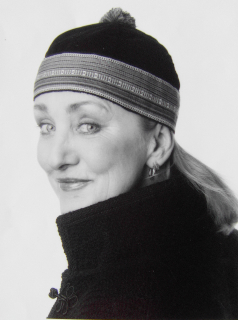
Kjersti Alveberg

- 7 October – Anne Baggethun, news anchor (born 1940).
- 9 October – Ole-Jacob Libæk, sports official (born 1937).
- 11 October – Olav Nilsen, footballer (born 1942).
- 12 October – Torstein Lyberg, surgeon (born 1947).
- 18 October – Kjersti Alveberg, dancer and choreographer (born 1948).
- 19 October – Sigurd Helseth, author (born 1945).
- 27 October – Terje Kristiansen, film director and producer (born 1944).
- 29 October – Reidar Due, politician (born 1929).
- 30 October – Normann Aanesland, economist (born 1933).

=== November ===
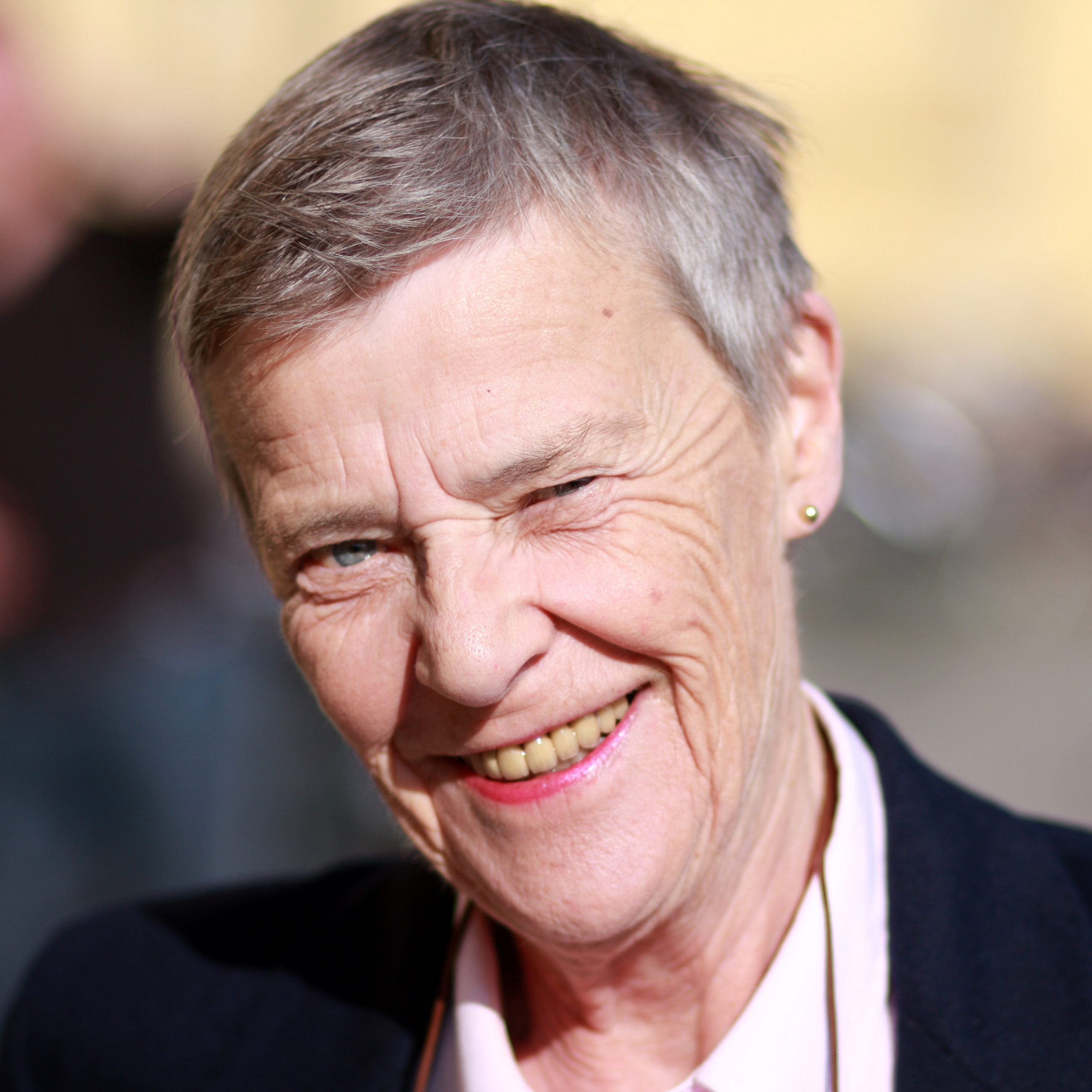
Kim Friele

- 6 November – Kari Risvik, translator (born 1932).
- 8 November – Vegar Hoel, actor (born 1973).
- 8 November – Odd F. Lindberg, seal inspector (born 1945).
- 10 November – Håkon Øverby, wrestler (born 1941).
- 15 November – Rolf Opås, writer (born 1946).
- 16 November – Øivind S. Jorfald, painter (born 1950).
- Tore Lindholt, economist (born 1941).
- 18 November – Leif Terje Løddesøl, banker (born ).
- 19 November – Hank von Hell, rock singer (born ).
- 19 November – Marie Lovise Widnes, poet and politician (born 1930).
- 20 November – Liv Sandberg, children's writer (born 1924?).
- 22 November – Kim Friele, LGBT activist (born 1935).
- 23 November – Bjørn Larsson, sport wrestler (born 1924).
- 27 November – Tor "Apetor" Eckhoff, youtuber (born 1964).

=== December ===
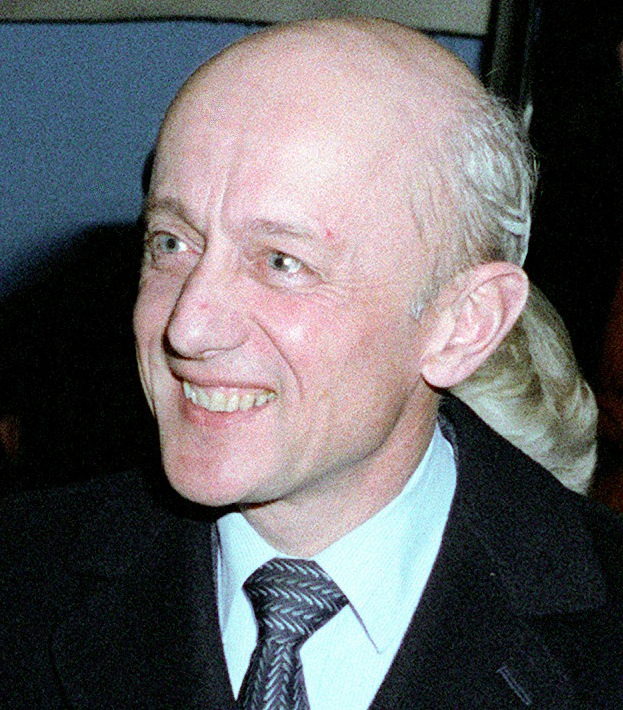
Kåre Willoch

- 1 December – Orm Øverland, literary historian (born 1935).
- 6 December – Kåre Willoch, Prime Minister (born 1928).
- 6 December – Jørgen Barth-Jørgensen, weightlifter (born 1932).
- 10 December – Ole Michael Selberg, translator (born 1938).
- 12 December – Kåre Berg, ski jumper (born 1932).
- 12 December – Vera Holmøy, Supreme Court justice (born 1931).
- 17 December – Dagfinn Sundal, finance broker (born 1945).
- 18 December – Olina Storsand, politician (born 1922).
- 21 December – Liv Thorsen, actress (born 1935).
- 24 December – Shirley Bottolfsen, humanitarian (born 1934).
- 27 December – Kjell Andreassen, evangelical singer (born 1936, died in the US).
