= Spilker =

Spilker is a surname. Notable people with the surname include:

- Annemarie Spilker (born 1980), Dutch photographer
- Hendrik Storstein Spilker (born 1965), Norwegian sociologist and media studies scholar
- James Spilker (1933–2019), American engineer and a Consulting Professor in the Aeronautics and Astronautics Department at Stanford University
- Linda Spilker (born 1955), American planetary scientist
- Marc Spilker (born 1964), American financial executive and investor
