= Tønnes Andenæs =

Norwegian politician

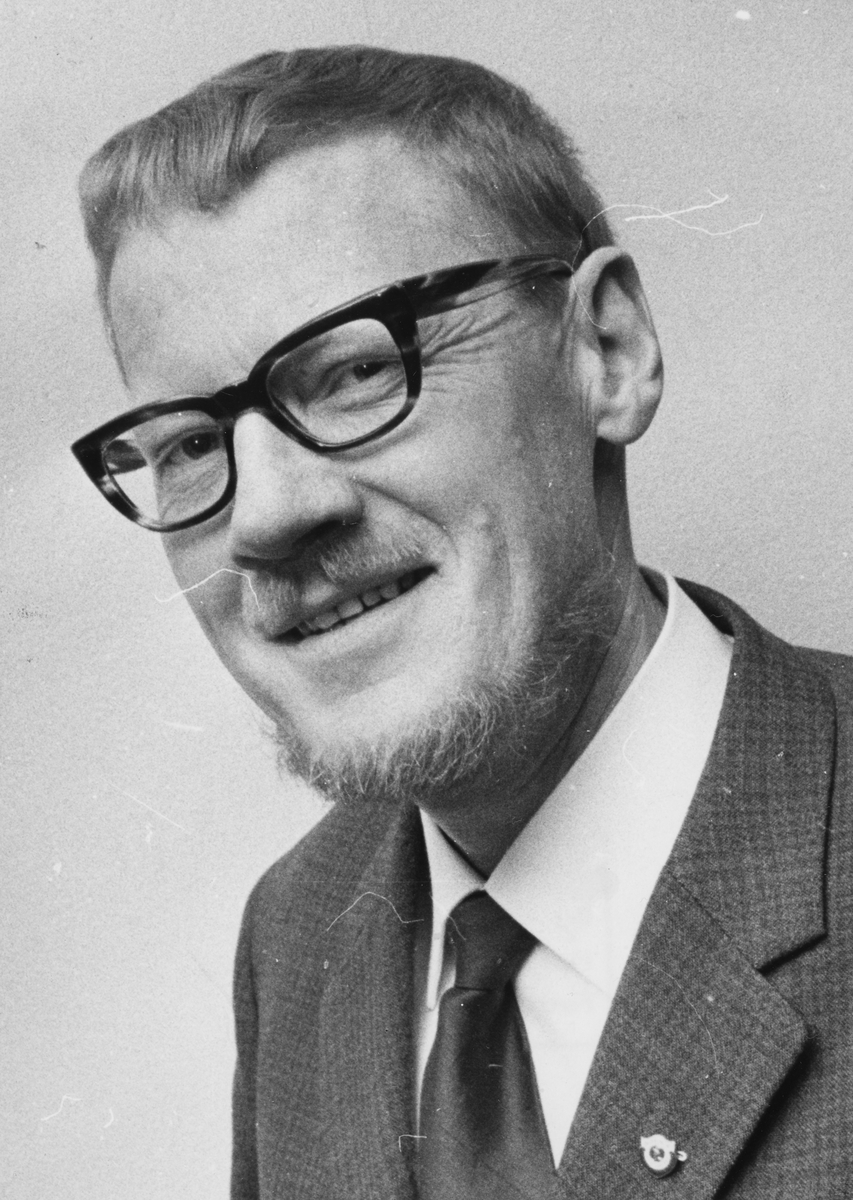
Tønnes Madsson Andenæs, portrait, man, publisher, bust.

Tønnes Madsson Andenæs (25 June 1923 – 22 February 1975) was a Norwegian jurist, book publisher and politician for the Labour Party.

== Biography ==
He was born at Innvik Municipality in Sogn og Fjordane county, Norway. he was a son of vicar Mads Olsen Andenæs (1855–1942) and his wife Signe Theoline Mydland (1883–1958). The family moved to Bærum when Tønnes Andenæs was two years old. He was a brother of Johs. Andenæs, and through him an uncle of Mads H. Andenæs. His own son Mads T. Andenæs (born 1957) became a professor of law.

During the occupation of Norway by Nazi Germany, young Andenæs became involved in the illegal press. He was arrested, but escaped via neutral Sweden to the United Kingdom. He underwent pilot training in Little Norway, from 1944. After the war he was decorated with the Defence Medal 1940–1945.

He enrolled at the University of Oslo, and graduated with the cand.jur. degree in 1955. He finished lawyer training in 1958. At the same time he was the chief executive of a publishing company, Akademisk Forlag. In 1956 it changed its name to Universitetsforlaget. He remained here until his death. He also wrote books himself. His 1949 release Grunnloven vår. Utgave for selvstudium about the Constitution of Norway has been reissued twelve times, the last in 1993, and has been translated to English (1951), French (1962) and German (1964).

He was also involved in cultural work, chairing the Norwegian-Faroese friendship society from 1947 to 1959 and the Norwegian-Icelandic friendship society from 1960 to 1965. He was decorated with the Order of the Falcon in 1965.

Andenæs was a member of the municipal council of Bærum Municipality from 1963 to 1971, and a member of the school board for the same period. From January to October 1965 he was a part of Gerhardsen's Fourth Cabinet, as a State Secretary in the Ministry of Church Affairs and Education. He also had a hiatus from 1967 to 1968, when he worked as an advisor at the Makerere University College. He was elected to the Parliament of Norway from the constituency Akershus in 1969, and was re-elected in 1973. He was a member of the Standing Committee on Transport during the first term, and then of the Standing Committee on Public Administration. He died midway in his last term, in the Tretten train disaster, and was replaced with Svein Gunnar Morgenlien.
