= Tor A. Benjaminsen =

Professor in development studies

- Born: 1960
- Awards: Scandinavian University Press Academic Journal Prize; ERC Advanced Grant
- Scientific career
- Fields: Human geography, development studies
- Institutions: Norwegian University of Life Sciences

Tor A. Benjaminsen (born 1960) is a Norwegian human geographer. He is a professor of international environmental and development studies at the Norwegian University of Life Sciences.

== Career ==
He earned his cand.scient. degree in resource geography and landscape ecology at the University of Oslo in 1988 and his Ph.D. in geography and development studies at Roskilde University in 1998.

He is known for his research on environmental change, environmental policy, land rights and the management of natural resources, especially in Africa. He researches material and discursive aspects of land-use conflicts and environmental change, including the ‘desertification’ of the West African Sahel, violent conflicts and climate change.

According to Google Scholar he has been cited around 8,000 times in academic literature and has an h-index of 42.

He received the Article of the Year – Scandinavian University Press Academic Journal Prize in 2009.

In 2022 he received a European Research Council Advanced Grant for a project that seeks to determine the causes of violent conflict and migration in the Sahel.
