= Tor Jonsson =

Norwegian author and journalist (1916–1951)

Tor Jonsson (14 May 1916 – 14 January 1951) was a Norwegian author and journalist. Tor Jonsson is known for simple, strongly worded lyric poetry, but his poems stir up conflicts and a sense of loneliness. One senses a strong resistance to the legacy of national romantic spirit in his works.

== Biography ==
His birthplace and childhood home was in the valley of Boverdal (Bøverdalen) in Lom Municipality in Oppland, Norway. His parents were Johannes Johnsen (1867–1929) and Torø Thorsen (1878–1950).

Jonsson lived in great poverty with a sick mother who was nearly helpless. His father also had difficulties and died early. Of necessity, Jonsson had to work as a farm and garden laborer, and later as a printer. Jonsson's poetry was strongly influenced by these younger years which conveys a sense of long shadows falling around the author. He remained bound by the needs of his mother and his sister, who had similar difficulties to his mother's. He attended the horticulture school (Valle videregående skole) at Lena in Østre Toten Municipality from 1939 to 1940. During the period 1945-47 he worked as a journalist at Dølenes Blad, later at Dølabladet (Otta) and as editor at Hallingdølen (Ål).

In the years from 1943 through 1948 he wrote several collections of poetry which were published as Mogning i mørkret, Berg ved blått vatn and Jarnnetter. After the death of his mother in June 1950, Tor Jonsson moved to Oslo. In 1950 his collection of articles, Nesler was published, followed the next year by Siste stikk. There he also became obsessively enamored with the journalist Ruth Alvesen, but she did not feel a reciprocal interest. The radical, intellectual, and energetic Tor Jonsson sought love, but was unsuccessful in achieving this desire, although he was well liked and had many good comrades. He had a troubled mind and in his childhood years was considered to be unusually focused, even to the point of becoming obsessed with a topic once he became interested in it. In 1951 Tor Jonsson committed suicide at 34 years of age.

He was awarded The Norwegian Critics Prize for Literature posthumously in 1956 in recognition of the enduring character of his work. His former home in Bøverdalen is now part of the outdoor museum Lom bygdamuseum at Presthaugen which is associated with the Gudbrandsdalsmusea.

== Bibliography ==
- Mogning i mørkret (lyric poetry) - 1943
- Berg ved blått vatn (lyric poetry) - 1946
- Jarnnetter (lyric poetry) - 1948
- Jul í Bygda (short story) - 1949
- Nesler (articles) - 1950
- Ein dagbok for mitt hjarte (lyric poetry) - 1951
- Siste stikk (one act play) - 1951
- Prosa i samling (prose) - 1960
- Diktning (poems and prose) - 1963
- Og evig er Ordet (lyric poetry with Reidar Djupedal) - 1970
- Kvite fuglar (lyric poetry with Otto Hageberg) - 1978
- Ved grensa (text with Anders Kjær) - 1995
- Blant bygdedyr og vestkantkrokodiller (prose with Ingar Sletten Kolloen) - 2000

== Prizes ==
- Melsom-prisen - 1952 (Posthumous honor)
- The Norwegian Critics Prize for Literature - 1956 (Posthumous honor)
