= Marianne Nordli Hansen =

Norwegian sociologist

- Born: 1957 (age 68–69)
- Awards: Scandinavian University Press Academic Journal Prize
- Scientific career
- Fields: Sociology
- Workplaces: University of Oslo

Marianne Nordli Hansen (born 1957) is a Norwegian sociologist. She is a professor of sociology at the University of Oslo.

== Career and work ==
She earned the Mag.Art. degree in sociology at the University of Oslo in 1984 and was a researcher at the Norwegian Institute for Social Research until 1996, when she became an associate professor of sociology at the University of Oslo. She was promoted to full professor in 1999.

She is known for her research on social stratification, education, social class, economic inequalities, and elites. She received the Article of the Year – Scandinavian University Press Academic Journal Prize in 2011.
