= Tord Larsen =

Norwegian anthropologist (born 1945)

Tord Larsen (born 26 January 1945) is a Norwegian social anthropologist. He is professor emeritus of social anthropology at the Norwegian University of Science and Technology (NTNU).

== Career and work ==
Larsen earned a B.A. at Dartmouth College in the United States in 1967 and a mag.art. (PhD) at the University of Oslo in 1977, with the dissertation Negotiating identity: ethnic incorporation among the Nova Scotia Micmacs. He worked at the University of Oslo 1977–1983 and the University of Bergen 1983–1990, and he became an associate professor at NTNU in 1991, where he later became a full professor.

He is known for his work on the historical and critical aspects of social anthropology. In 2005 he received the Article of the Year – Scandinavian University Press Academic Journal Prize.

== Selected bibliography ==
- Den globale samtalen. Om dialogens muligheter. Universitetsforlaget, 2009. ISBN 9788230400500
- "Acts of Entification. On the Emergence of Thinghood in Social Life". In Rapport, Nigel (ed): Human Nature as Capacity. An Ethnographic Approach, Berghahn, 2008.
- "Melankoli og retorisk heroisme: Om former for antropologisk gjenstandsdannelse." Rhetorica Scandinavica, no. 40, 2006.
- "Om historisering av forskjeller." Norsk Antropologisk Tidsskrift, 2005.
- "Synd og tilblivelse." In Siri Meyer og Gressgård, Randi: Fanden går i kloster. Elleve tekster om det andre, Spartacus, 2002.
- "Antropologienes kulturbegrep." In Melby, Kari, Pål Repstad and Siri Gerrard (eds.): Kulturforståelser i fagene, Høyskoleforlaget, 1999.
- "Den globale samtalen. Modernisering, representasjon og subjektkontruksjon." In Eriksen, Thomas Hylland and Oscar Hemer (eds.): Fundamentalisme og ambivalens: Seks Essays om kulturens globalisering, Spartacus, 1999.
- "I begynnelsen var Amerika. Den amerikanske indianer, kontraktteorien og den industrielle revolusjon." In Bagge, Sverre (ed): Det europeiske menneske. Individoppfatninger fra middelalderen til i dag, Ad Notam, Gyldendal, 1998.
- "Action, Morality and Cultural Translation." Journal of Anthropological Research, 1987.
- "Negotiating Identity: The Micmac of Nova Scotia." In Tanner, Adrian (ed.): The Politics of Indianness, ISER, St. John's, 1983.
