= Knut Hamsun: Dreamer and Dissenter =

2007 book by Ingar Sletten Kolloen

- Author: Ingar Sletten Kolloen
- Original title: Hamsun. Svermer og erobrer
- Translator: Erik Sluggevik; Deborah Fawkin
- Language: Norwegian
- Publication date: 2007
- Publication place: Norway
- English publication date: 2009
- Pages: 428
- ISBN: 9788205390461

Knut Hamsun: Dreamer and Dissenter (Norwegian: Hamsun. Svermer og erobrer) is a biography of the Norwegian writer Knut Hamsun, written by Ingar Sletten Kolloen. It covers Hamsun's life, literary works, family, personal obsessions and political activity.

It is a shortened international version in one volume of the books Hamsun. Svermeren (2003, lit. 'The Zealot') and Hamsun. Erobreren (2004, lit. 'The Conqueror'). Sletten Kolloen worked on the entire project for five years. Gyldendal Norsk Forlag published the shortened version as an audiobook in Norwegian in 2007 and as a print book in 2009. Yale University Press published it in an English translation by Erik Sluggevik and Deborah Fawkin in 2009.

Publishers Weekly wrote in its review that "Hamsun is given his due, although at something of an academic distance, in this unsentimental portrait".
