= Nora Simonhjell =

Norwegian literary scholar, author

- Born: 1970
- Awards: Scandinavian University Press Academic Journal Prize
- Scientific career
- Fields: Norwegian literature
- Institutions: University of Agder
- Thesis: Krøplingkroppar: Om litterær framstilling av merkte, aldrande og funksjonshemma kroppar i Lars Ramslies Biopsi og Stig Sæterbakkens Siamesisk (2010)

Nora Simonhjell (born 26 July 1970) is a Norwegian literary scholar, author and poet. She is a full professor of Norwegian literature at the University of Agder.

== Career ==
She earned her cand.philol. degree in literature at the University of Bergen in 1996 and her PhD at the University of Agder in 2010. She was a research fellow at the University of Agder from 2005 to 2008, and then an associate professor at the Scandinavian Studies department at Aarhus University. She is now a full professor of Norwegian literature at the University of Agder.

She has published two collections of poetry. Her first poetry collection, titled Slaktarmøte, was published by Tiden Norsk Forlag in 1999. In 2001 her second poetry collection, titled Kvassare, was published by Tiden.

Both her research and her fiction works revolve around questions of identity, such as the creation and recreation of identity.

She received the Article of the Year – Scandinavian University Press Academic Journal Prize in 2019, for the article "De skrev henne ned."

== Selected bibliography ==
- Slaktarmøte, poetry, Tiden Norsk Forlag (1999)
- Kvassare, poetry, Tiden Norsk Forlag (2001)
- Norsk litterær årbok, Det Norske Samlaget (2017)
