= Ingar Sletten Kolloen =

Norwegian author and editor (born 1951)

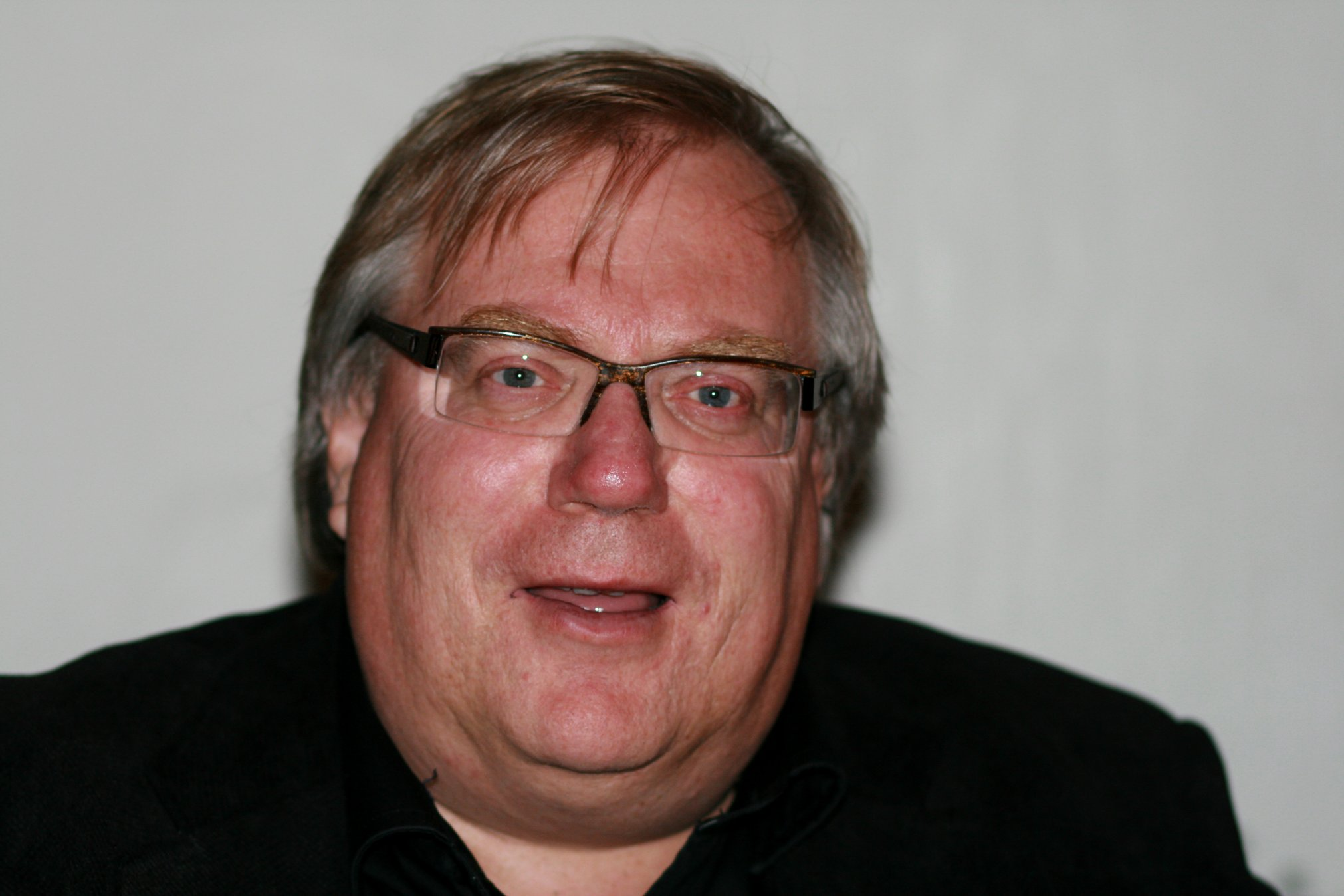
- Born: 9 July 1951 (age 75)
- Occupations: Journalist; Biographer; Novelist; Playwright

Ingar Sletten Kolloen (born 9 July 1951) is a Norwegian journalist, biographer, novelist and playwright. He has written biographies of Tor Jonsson, Knut Hamsun and Joralf Gjerstad. His two volumes about Hamsun, published in 2003 and 2004, were also reworked into a shorter international version as Knut Hamsun: Dreamer and Dissenter. He wrote the play Jeg kunne gråte blod in 2004, and the novel Den fjerde engelen in 2007.
