= Siemke Böhnisch =

German theatre and media scholar

- Born: 1964 (age 60–61)
- Awards: Scandinavian University Press Academic Journal Prize
- Scientific career
- Fields: Theatre studies
- Institutions: University of Agder
- Thesis: Feedbacksløyfer i teater for svært unge tilskuere: Et bidrag til en performativ teori og analyse (2010)

Siemke Böhnisch (born 1964) is a German theatre and media scholar. She is a professor of theatre studies at the University of Agder in Norway.

== Career ==
She earned a PhD in dramaturgy at Aarhus University in 2010 with the dissertation Feedbacksløyfer i teater for svært unge tilskuere. She is a full professor of theatre studies at the University of Agder, and heads the research group on art and conflict. Her research focuses e.g. on how theatre, literature and other art forms approach different kinds of conflict. She is currently researching how the Second World War is depicted in film and television.

She received the Article of the Year – Scandinavian University Press Academic Journal Prize in 2014, for the article "Å gi Breivik en scene? Scenekunst etter 22. juli. Med en næranalyse av Milo Raus 'Breiviks Erklährung.'"
