= Svein Gunnar Morgenlien =

Norwegian politician

Svein Gunnar Morgenlien (13 May 1922 – 22 September 2016) was a Norwegian trade unionist and politician for the Labour Party.

He was born in Aurskog as a son of smallholder and sawmill manager Johan Morgenlien (1878–1948) and housewife Ovidia Davidsen (1882–1970). He spent his working career as a forest worker and sawmill manager from 1937 to 1959 and forest manager from 1959 to 1962.

Morgenlien was involved in the trade union Norsk skog- og landarbeiderforbund, which in 1988 merged to form the United Federation of Trade Unions. From 1956 to 1960 he was a national board member, from 1962 to 1965 he was a secretary, from 1965 to 1979 he was treasurer and from 1979 to 1987 he was chairman. In the Norwegian Confederation of Trade Unions he was a member of the supervisory board from 1965 to 1977 and secretariat from 1979 to 1987.

He was a board member of his local party chapter from 1955 to 1972 and the regional chapter from 1968 to 1973. He served as a deputy representative to the Parliament of Norway from the constituency Akershus during the terms 1961–1965, 1969–1973, 1973–1977 and 1977–1981. Midway in the third term, the regular representative Tønnes Andenæs died and Morgenlien himself became a regular representative. In the entire fourth term he covered for cabinet members Inger Louise Valle and Helen Marie Bøsterud. He was a member of the Standing Committee on Public Administration during the first two years, and then of the Standing Committee on Agriculture.

Morgenlien was a board member of the Norwegian Labour Inspection Authority from 1981 to 1988. He died at the age of 94 on 22 September 2016.
