= Erling E. Guldbrandsen =

Professor in music studies

- Born: 1960
- Awards: His Majesty The King's Gold Medal; Scandinavian University Press Academic Journal Prize
- Scientific career
- Fields: Musicology
- Institutions: University of Oslo
- Thesis: Tradisjon og tradisjonsbrudd (1996)

Erling E. Guldbrandsen (born 1960) is a Norwegian musicologist. He is a professor of musicology at the University of Oslo.

== Career and work ==
He earned the Mag.Art. degree with a dissertation on Norwegian contemporary music and the dr.philos. degree with a dissertation on European postwar modernist music, with a focus on Pierre Boulez. He is professor of musicology at the University of Oslo's Department of Musicology and the RITMO Centre for Interdisciplinary Studies in Rhythm, Time and Motion.

He is known for his research on music history and analysis, with a focus on Western art music from the last three centuries, musical aesthetics and interpretation theory. He received His Majesty The King's gold medal for his research in 1996, and the Article of the Year – Scandinavian University Press Academic Journal Prize in 2006.
