= Jens Chr. Andvig =

Norwegian economist (born 1947)

- Born: 1947 (age 78–79)
- Awards: Scandinavian University Press Academic Journal Prize
- Scientific career
- Fields: Economics
- Institutions: Norwegian Institute of International Affairs

Jens Christopher Andvig (born 1947) is a Norwegian economist. He is a research professor emeritus at the Norwegian Institute of International Affairs (NUPI).

== Career ==
He earned the cand.oecon. degree at the University of Oslo in 1975 and the dr.philos. degree at the same institution in 1986. He became a researcher at the Norwegian Institute of International Affairs in 1980, where he eventually was promoted to senior researcher and then research professor.

He is known for his research on comparative economics and political economy, especially the interaction between the public sector and the market economy, with topics such as corruption, public procurement and the transition from a socialist economy to market economy.

He received the Article of the Year – Scandinavian University Press Academic Journal Prize in 2008.
