= Jon Haarberg =

Norwegian writer and professor

- Born: 1953
- Awards: Member of the Norwegian Academy of Science and Letters; Scandinavian University Press Academic Journal Prize
- Scientific career
- Fields: Literature
- Institutions: University of Oslo

Jon Marius Sæland Haarberg (born 1953) is a Norwegian literary scholar, and professor of literature at the University of Oslo.

== Career and work ==
Haarberg was an editor and later editor-in-chief of the publisher Universitetsforlaget from 1984 to 1992, when he became a research fellow at the University of Oslo. He later became an associate professor and was promoted to full professor of literature in 2003.

His books include Vinje på vrangen (1985), Parody and the Praise of Folly (1997), Verdenslitteratur: Den vestlige tradisjonen (2007) and Nei, vi elsker ikke lenger: Litteraturen og nasjonen (2017). As a literary researcher, Haarberg has worked in the borderland between philology and literary studies. He is also known for the historical-critical edition of Petter Dass' Katekismesanger (Catechism Songs).

== Honours ==
He was elected as a member of the Norwegian Academy of Science and Letters in 2009. He received the Article of the Year – Scandinavian University Press Academic Journal Prize in 2012.
