= Marguerite Thoresen =

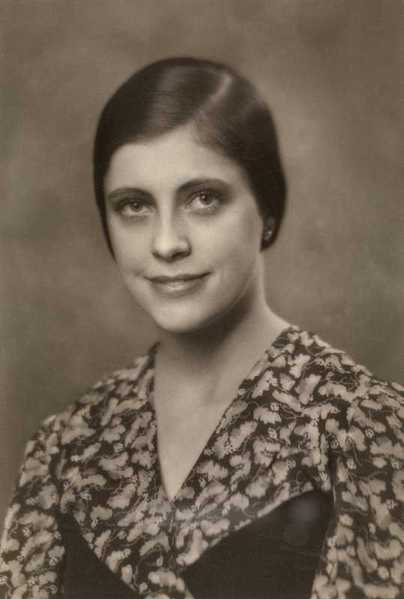
Rita Tori in 1929, one year before her debut in the Monte Carlo Opera.

Rita Tori (born Marguerite Thoresen; 17 June 1908 – 16 August 1967) was an internationally noted Norwegian ballet dancer, instructor and choreographer.

== Early life, family and education ==
She was born to Norwegian parents living in Shanghai, China. Her father, Olaf Thoresen (1870–1937), managed a Chinese-based Norwegian trading company, Det Oversøiske Compagnie ("The Overseas Company"; known in China as Ku Ti Sang). She studied ballet from an early age, training in both London and Paris. Among other dance instructors, she studied under Lyubov Yegorova.

== Career ==
She debuted at the Opéra de Monte-Carlo in 1930. She danced at René Blums Ballets de Monte Carlo in 1936 and opened a dance academy in Oslo that same year. From 1953 to 1958, she was the Director of the Norwegian Ballet (Den Norske Ballett).

Among her students were Anne Borg, Jorunn Kirkenær, Guri Lysell, Mette Møller and Grete Brunvoll.

== Imprisonment ==
During the occupation of Norway by Nazi Germany during World War II, Tori was part of the resistance. She was arrested, imprisoned in Åkebergveien from 21 September 1944, then in the Grini concentration camp from 3 November 1944 until her release on 26 March 1945.

== Personal life and demise ==
She died in Norway in 1967. She was awarded the Norwegian King's Medal of Merit posthumously.
