= Trude Haugli =

Law professor

Trude Haugli (born 1958) is a Norwegian jurist, Professor of Law and former Dean of the Faculty of Law at the University of Tromsø. She is known as a principal founder of the research field of children's law in Norway, and has served as chair of the national Equality and Discrimination Tribunal and the government-appointed Royal Commission on Child Welfare Services.

== Career ==
Trude Haugli is the daughter of the noted lawyer and police executive Willy Haugli. She earned her cand.jur. degree at the University of Oslo in 1983. She became a research fellow in law at the University of Tromsø in 1992 and earned her dr.jur. degree at that university in 1998. Her research has focused on children's rights, and contributed significantly to the establishment of children's law as a research field in Norway.

She became an associate professor of law at the University of Tromsø in 1998 and was promoted to full professor in 2002. She served as Dean of the Faculty of Law at the University of Tromsø from 1998 to 2001, from 2007 to 2009 and from 2013 to 2018. From 2005 to 2006 she was a judge on the Hålogaland Court of Appeal. She was appointed by the Norwegian government as chair of the Equality and Discrimination Tribunal, a national body, in 2010 and served until 2014. In 2014 she was appointed by the government as chair of the Royal Commission on Child Welfare Services that proposed a new child welfare services act.

== Honours ==
In 2004 she was the first recipient of the Article of the Year – Scandinavian University Press Academic Journal Prize.

== Selected books ==
- Sentrale emner i barneretten, Universitetsforlaget, 2015.
- Samværsrett i barnevernssaker: Psykologiske og juridiske vurderinger, Universitetsforlaget 2010.
- Samværsrett i barnevernsaker, Universitetsforlaget 2000.
