= Universitetsforlaget =

Norwegian publisher

Universitetsforlaget AS
- Parent company: Aschehoug
- Founded: 2000; Predecessors founded in 1890, 1933 and 1950
- Country of origin: Norway
- Headquarters location: Oslo
- Key people: Hege Gundersen (CEO)
- Publication types: books, journals
- No. of employees: Ca. 50 (2021)
- Official website: www.universitetsforlaget.no

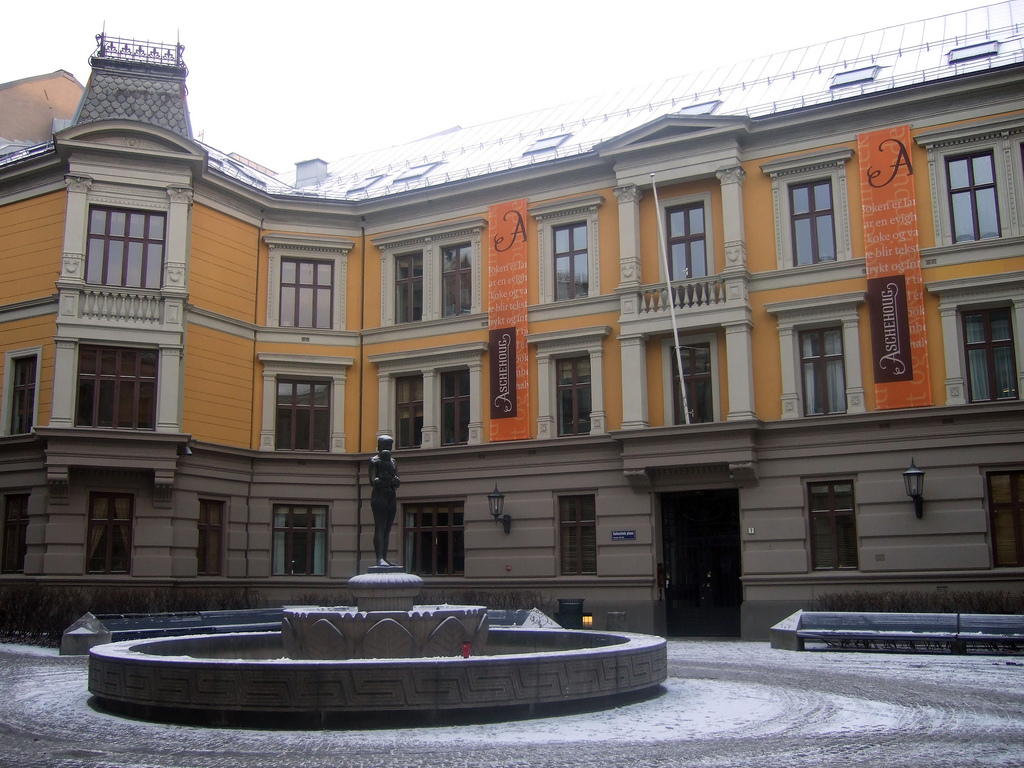
The offices of Aschehoug and Universitetsforlaget

Universitetsforlaget AS (English: The University Press), also known in English as Scandinavian University Press, is a Norwegian academic publishing company, which publishes non-fiction literature and journals mainly oriented to Scandinavia. Universitetsforlaget is the largest academic press in Scandinavia, and is a wholly owned independently operated subsidiary of Aschehoug, founded in 1872. Universitetsforlaget was originally the name of an independent publishing company founded by Tønnes Andenæs in 1950, which later merged with other publishing companies to become a subsidiary of Aschehoug in 2000.

== History ==
The publishing house in its current form was established in 2000, and has two different origins: One is Universitetsforlaget, founded by Tønnes Andenæs in 1950; the company purchased Swedish academic journal publisher Almqvist & Wiksell International in 1991. The second origin is the publishing house Tanum-Norli, which is itself the result of the merger of two publishing companies founded in 1890 and 1933, respectively. In 1982 Aschehoug acquired Tanum-Norli, which was renamed Tano. In 2000, Tano and Universitetsforlaget merged under the name Universitetsforlaget. The international journals were sold to Taylor & Francis in the 2000s. Today, the publisher is a wholly owned subsidiary of Aschehoug and publishes books and academic journals in the Scandinavian languages.

Universitetsforlaget has around 50 employees. The publishing house publishes around 80 academic journals and 140 books every year.

CEOs of Universitetsforlaget:

- 2000–2002 : Laila Stange
- 2002–2005 : Arne Magnus
- 2005–2014 : Svein Skarheim
- 2014– : Hege Gundersen

== Awards ==
=== Article of the Year – The Scandinavian University Press Academic Journal Prize ===
The Article of the Year – The Scandinavian University Press Academic Journal Prize (Norwegian: Årets tidsskriftartikkel – Universitetsforlagets tidsskriftpris) is a Nordic academic prize awarded by Universitetsforlaget to "recognise the best scholarship that is published in the Nordic countries." A Nordic jury selects the recipient(s) on the basis of nominations from 42 academic journals. Each journal nominates the best article that was published in the journal in the past year.

The recipients are:

- 2004: Trude Haugli
- 2005: Tord Larsen
- 2006: Erling E. Guldbrandsen
- 2007: Ove Skarpenes
- 2008: Jens Chr. Andvig
- 2009: Tor A. Benjaminsen
- 2010: Audun Dybdahl
- 2011: Marianne Nordli Hansen
- 2012: Jon Haarberg
- 2013: Bjørn Egil Flø
- 2014: Siemke Böhnisch
- 2015: Terje Tvedt
- 2016: Knut Fossestøl, Eric Breit and Elin Borg
- 2017: Gøran Østerman Thengs
- 2018: Lars E.F. Johannessen
- 2019: Nora Simonhjell and Ingvil Hellstrand
- 2020: Hendrik Storstein Spilker and Magnus Kongshaug Johannessen
- 2021: Margunn Bjørnholt
- 2022: Christian Refsum

== See also ==
- Journals published by Universitetsforlaget
- Open access in Norway
