= Hendrik Storstein Spilker =

Norwegian sociologist

- Born: 1965
- Awards: Scandinavian University Press Academic Journal Prize
- Scientific career
- Fields: Sociology
- Institutions: Norwegian University of Science and Technology
- Thesis: Den store oppdagelsen (2005)

Hendrik Storstein Spilker (born 1965) is a Norwegian sociologist and media studies scholar. He is a professor of media and technology at the Norwegian University of Science and Technology (NTNU).

== Career ==
He earned his cand.polit. degree at NTNU in 1998 and his doctoral degree in sociology at the same institution in 2005, with a dissertation on the development of commercial Internet services in Norway from 1997. He was a postdoctoral researcher at NTNU from 2005 to 2007, when he became a tenured associate professor of sociology at NTNU. He was later promoted to full professor of media and technology.

He received the Article of the Year – Scandinavian University Press Academic Journal Prize in 2020.
