= Jorunn Kirkenær =

Norwegian dancer (1926–2021)

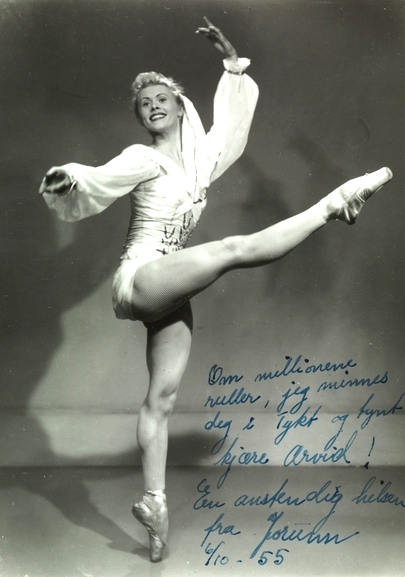
- Kirkenær c.1955
- Born: 3 May 1926; Oslo, Norway
- Died: 25 January 2021 (aged 94)
- Occupation(s): Dancer; Choreographer
- Awards: King's Medal of Merit in Gold

Jorunn Kirkenær (3 May 1926 – 25 January 2021) was a Norwegian ballet dancer and choreographer.

== Career ==
She was born in Oslo, and married dancer and actor Even Kirkenær in 1948. She studied classical ballet with Rita Tori from 1945, and graduated as pedagogist in dance and choreography in 1947. She performed on various stages, including Malmö City Theatre, Nationaltheatret, Det Norske Teatret and Den Norske Ballett. Together with her husband, she founded what is now named the Kirkenær Ballettskole. Attached to the school is a professional children's company, Kirkenær Barneballetten. Some of her works as choreographer include Reisen til Julestjernen (for the National Theatre), and ballet versions of the children's operas Little Red Riding Hood and Ma mère l'Oye for television with the Norwegian Broadcasting Corporation.

In 1966 she founded and designed the curriculum for the dance and pedagogy training school Ballettinstituttet (now Det Norske Balletthoyskole).

She was awarded the King's Medal of Merit in gold in 1996.
