= Halvard Bjørkvik =

Norwegian historian (1924–2021)

- Born: 9 October 1924; Finnøy Municipality, Norway
- Died: 17 June 2021 (aged 96)
- Occupation: Historian

Halvard Bjørkvik (9 October 1924 – 17 June 2021) was a Norwegian historian.

== Career ==
He was born in Finnøy Municipality. He was manager of the Norwegian Museum of Cultural History from 1975, and was appointed adjunct professor at the University of Oslo from 1984, promoted to professor in 1990. His research focused on the agrarian history. He was decorated with the King's Medal of Merit in gold in 2006.

== Selected publications ==
- Halvard Bjørkvik (1958). Land Ownership and Land Rent in Ryfylke in Older Times. Rogaland historie- og ættesogelag.
- Halvard Bjørkvik (1972). Who Owned the Land during the Old Period of Land Tenancy?. Tapir Forlag.

== Death ==
He died in June 2021 at the age of 96.
