= Olav M. Skulberg =

Norwegian limnologist (1930–2021)

Olav Magnus Skulberg (3 August 1930 – 15 January 2021) was a Norwegian limnologist.

He was born in Spydeberg, and finished his secondary education in Askim in 1949. He studied at the University of Oslo as well as in Switzerland. In 1958 he was hired in the Norwegian Institute for Water Research, becoming a specialist on freshwater algae. He was a fellow of the Linnean Society of London. He died in January 2021.
