= Karen Kleven =

Norwegian politician (1925–2021)

Karen Kleven (21 July 1925 – 28 March 2021) was a Norwegian politician for the Conservative Party.

She served as a deputy representative to the Parliament of Norway from Finnmark during the terms 1973–1977 and 1977–1981. In total she met during 26 days of parliamentary session. She hailed from Hammerfest Municipality.
