= Øivind S. Jorfald =

Øivind Sigvart Jorfald (born 8 September 1950) is a Norwegian cartoonist, visual artist, illustrator and animator, based in Asker.

Øivind S. Jorfald mainly works in hand coloured engravings, lithography and drawings/watercolor paintings. His pictures are mostly small and of a humorous nature. The sea and women are repeating motifs in his pictures. He has also illustrated a number of books, mostly children's books. Øivind Jorfald has also made a number of animated films, including Steinen, for which he won an Amanda Award in 1990. In 1981, he released the book Bygging av flaskeskuter.
