= Joralf Gjerstad =

Norwegian faith healer (1926–2021)

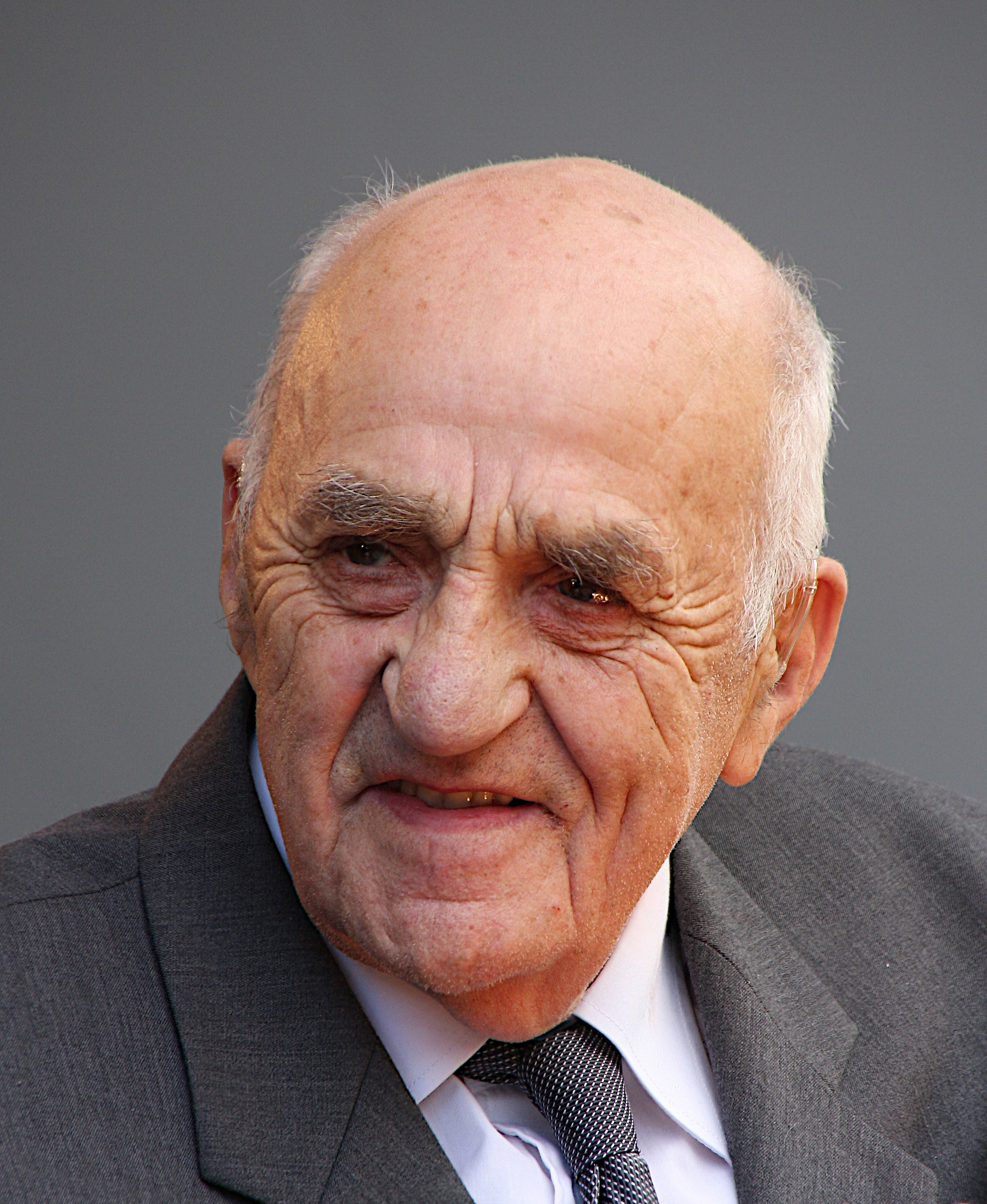
Portrait of Joralf Gjerstad

Joralf Gjerstad (11 April 1926 – 18 June 2021) was a Norwegian self-identified psychic and faith healer. He was born in Snåsa Municipality and was known as "the man with warm hands", "Snåsamannen" ('The Snåsa Man') or locally "Snåsakaill'n".

Joralf Gjerstad claimed that his supposed ability to heal people came from his Christian faith, and that he was not the only one in his family with psychic powers. A biography of him by Ingar Sletten Kolloen, published in 2008, became a bestseller in Norway.

Gjerstad worked as a control assistant at a dairy farm for 25 years and for the Snåsa church for 16 years. He wrote several local history books together with many biographies. He was also a local politician and served as the deputy mayor for the Labour Party in Snåsa.

He was one of the main founders of “Marthe and Joralf’s help fund”, which funds organizations that arrange outdoor events for people with disabilities in Nord-Trøndelag.

Gjerstad also researched the emigration from Snåsa to America. The connection between Snåsa and St. Olaf College in Minnesota (where one of the founders, Bernt Julius Muus, came from Snåsa) was established through him.

He received the King's medal of Merit in silver in 2001 and a documentary Kjenner du varmen? ('Do you feel the heat?') about his abilities was made by and shown on NRK (Norwegian Broadcasting Corporation) in 2006. In honor of his work, the Gjerstad Foundation decided to renovate his childhood home, and it is now a museum. There is also a museum with information about Joralf and his life at Snåsa Hotel.

He refused to be tested by "scientists and other experts". Prominent Norwegian scientists and researchers expressed scepticism over his claims and the uncritical coverage of him in the Norwegian press. Leading sceptic James Randi offered Gjerstad a million dollar prize if he could demonstrate his abilities under controlled conditions.

Gjerstad died in June 2021 at the age of 95.

== Literature ==
- Joralf Gjerstad: Snåsninger og andre nordmenn i Vesterled, 1998, ISBN 82-994825-1-8
- Joralf Gjerstad: Det godes vilje: minner fra liv og virke, 2004, ISBN 978-82-92305-07-2
- Joralf Gjerstad: Å stå i lyset, 2006, ISBN 978-82-92577-17-2
- Ingar Sletten Kolloen: Snåsamannen, 2008
