= Kjell Risvik =

Norwegian translator (1941–2021)

- Born: 29 June 1941
- Died: 28 March 2021 (aged 79)
- Occupation: Translator
- Spouse: Kari Risvik
- Awards: Brage Honorary Prize; Bastian Prize

Kjell Risvik (29 June 1941 – 28 March 2021) was a translator of literature into Norwegian from various languages, including Catalan, English, French, German, Hebrew, Italian, Portuguese and Spanish.

He was awarded the Brage Honorary Prize in 2006, along with his wife Kari Risvik.

Awards
Preceded by Tom Rønnow	Recipient of the Bastian Prize; 1975	Succeeded by Carl Fredrik Engelstad
