= Kari Risvik =

Norwegian translator

- Born: 13 June 1932
- Died: 6 November 2021 (aged 89)
- Occupation: Translator
- Spouse: Kjell Risvik
- Awards: Fritt Ord Honorary Award (1996); Brage Honorary Prize (2006)

Kari Risvik (13 June 1932 – 6 November 2021) was a Norwegian translator, one of the most productive translators of literature into Norwegian language. She has translated books from several languages, including English, Spanish and German.

She received the Fritt Ord Honorary Award in 1996, for bringing works by Salman Rushdie into Norwegian. She was awarded the Brage Honorary Prize, in 2006, along with her husband Kjell Risvik.

Risvik died on 6 November 2021.
