= Egil Øyjord =

Norwegian academic (1928–2021)

Egil Øyjord (Mo i Rana, 31 August 1928 – Ås, 10 February 2021) was a Norwegian professor emeritus at the Norwegian University of Life Sciences, who in 1964 founded the International Association on Mechanization of Field Experiments (IAMFE). He was president of IAMFE for 36 years. The main objective of the association is to inform agronomists and plant breeders about new machinery, equipment, and instruments to increase the capacity and accuracy of their experimental work.

Øyjord worked with the construction of machinery and equipment for the mechanization of field experiments. Øyjord invented the interchangeable distributor heads in 1965. This made the Øyjord plot seeders to a world article with export to 57 countries. In 2003 he received the King's Medal of Merit in Gold for his work for developing and manufacturing the world's first plot seeders for seeding of multiple rows of one variety.
