= Kaare Sandegren =

Norwegian trade unionist and diplomat (1929–2021)

- Born: March 18, 1929 (age 96)
- Died: July 29, 2021 (aged 92)
- Occupations: Unionist, diplomat, and politician

Kaare Sandegren (18 March 1929 – 29 July 2021) was a Norwegian trade unionist, diplomat and member of the Labour Party.

== Early life and education ==
He has a master's degree from the University of Oregon and Fletcher School of Law and Diplomacy in 1953. He completed additional studies in Norway in 1956.

== Career ==
He started as a diplomat at the Ministry of Foreign Affairs. He worked at the Norwegian delegation to NATO in 1959 before becoming chargés d'affaires in Bangkok in 1963 and 1964. He was an executive in the ministry from 1969. He became secretary of international affairs at the Norwegian Confederation of Trade Unions in 1974. He was deputy member of the Norwegian Nobel Committee and met regularly in 1990, 1993 and 1996. Sandegren was also a deputy member of the Parliament of Norway from Oslo during the term 2001–2005, but did not meet during parliamentary session.
