= Norwegian football clubs in European competitions =

Norwegian football teams have entered Union of European Football Associations (UEFA) club competitions every season since 1960. Nineteen clubs have represented Norway in four official tournaments: the Champions League (originally the European Cup), the Europa League (originally the UEFA Cup), the Conference League, the Cup Winners' Cup and the Intertoto Cup, the latter two which are now defunct. Rosenborg has participated in thirty seasons, more than any other Norwegian team, while Fyllingen, Gjøvik-Lyn, Haugar and Kongsvinger have only participated once each. No Norwegian teams have ever advanced to the final of any European final with Bodø/Glimt having reached one semi-final.

Fredrikstad made Norway's debut by winning over Ajax in the 1960–61 European Cup. They would represent Norway for the first three seasons until Lyn took the place in 1963–64. The same year Gjøvik-Lyn debuted for Norway in the Cup Winners' Cup. Rosenborg made Norway's debut in the UEFA Cup in 1971. In 93 entries between 1960 and 1992, Norwegian clubs only succeeded at advancing past the first fixture sixteen times, and only once past the second, when Lyn reached the 1968–69 European Cup Winners' Cup quarter-finals.

From 1993 Norwegian clubs started advancing past the first rounds more regularly. Rosenborg reached the group stage of the 1995–96 UEFA Champions League and would qualify for that level eight consecutive times and eleven in total. The following season Rosenborg reached the quarter-finals, the same season as Brann reached the quarter-finals of the Cup Winners' Cup. Vålerenga would match the feat in the 1998–99 UEFA Cup Winners' Cup. The following year Molde qualified to bring two teams to the group stage of the 1999–2000 UEFA Champions League. The 2005–06 season saw Rosenborg play in the Champions League group stage and both Viking and Tromsø play in the UEFA Cup group stage. Rosenborg is the only team qualify for the UEFA Cup by winning all its matches in the Intertoto Cup, an achievement they completed in 2008.

Since 2010 only Molde, Bodø/Glimt and Brann have managed to progress past the group stage in any competition. Molde has reached the round of 16 three times between the 2020–21 Europa League and the 2024–25 Conference League, Bodø/Glimt reached the quarter-finals in the 2021–22 Conference League, the semi-finals in the 2024–25 Europa League, and the round of sixteen in the 2025-26 Champions League. Brann reached the knockout round play-offs in the 2025–26 Europa League.

Werder Bremen has eliminated Norwegian teams a record five times out of five attempts. Linfield has played Norwegian teams a record seven times, with the team being eliminated a record five times. Viking holds a Norwegian record 18–0 victory Principat from 1999, while Leeds United served a Norwegian record 0–16 defeat for Lyn in 1969.

== Results ==
Key

- (a.e.t.) = Match determined after extra time
- (a) = Match determined via away goals rule
- (pen.) = Match determined via penalty shoot-out
- (wo) = Walkover
- GS = Group stage
- G1 = First group stage
- G2 = Second group stage
- PO = Play-off round
- R1 = First Round
- R2 = Second Round
- R3 = Third Round
- SF = Semi-finals
- QF = Quarter-finals
- R32 = Round of 32
- R16 = Round of 16
- KPO = Knockout round play-offs
- QR = Qualification round
- Q1 = First qualification round
- Q2 = Second qualification round
- Q3 = Third qualification round

Season	Tournament	Club	Eliminated by	Score	Round	Eliminated team(s)	Ref(s)
1960–61	European Cup	Fredrikstad	(Denmark) AGF Aarhus	0–4	R1	(Netherlands) Ajax (4–3)	
1961–62	European Cup	Fredrikstad	(Belgium) Standard Liège	0–4	PR	—	
1962–63	European Cup	Fredrikstad	(Hungary) Vasas	1–11	PR	—	
1963–64	European Cup	Lyn	(Germany) Borussia Dortmund	3–7	PR	—	
1963–64	Cup Winners' Cup	Gjøvik-Lyn	(Cyprus) APOEL	0–7	R1	—	
1964–65	European Cup	Lyn	(Netherlands) Amsterdam	1–8	R1	(Finland) Reipas Lahti (4–2)	
1964–65	Cup Winners' Cup	Skeid	(Finland) Haka	1–2	R1	—	
1965–66	European Cup	Lyn	(Northern Ireland) Derry City	6–8	PR	—	
1965–66	Cup Winners' Cup	Rosenborg	(Soviet Union) Dynamo Kyiv	1–6	R1	(Iceland) KR (6–2)	
1966–67	European Cup	Vålerenga	(Northern Ireland) Linfield	2–5	R2	(Albania) KF Tirana (wo)	
1966–67	Cup Winners' Cup	Skeid	(Spain) Zaragoza	4–5	R1	—	
1967–68	European Cup	Skeid	(Czechoslovakia) Sparta Prague	1–2	R1	—	
1967–68	Cup Winners' Cup	Fredrikstad	(Portugal) Vitória	2–7	R1	—	
1968–69	European Cup	Rosenborg	(Austria) Rapid Wien	4–6	R1	—	
1968–69	Cup Winners' Cup	Lyn	(Spain) Barcelona	4–5	QF	(Turkey) Altay (5–4), (Sweden) Norrköping (4–3)	
1969–70	European Cup	Lyn	(England) Leeds United	0–16	R1	—	
1969–70	Cup Winners' Cup	Mjøndalen	(Wales) Cardiff	2–12	R1	—	
1970–71	European Cup	Rosenborg	(Belgium) Standard Liège	0–7	R1	—	
1970–71	Cup Winners' Cup	Strømsgodset	(France) Nantes	3–7	R1	—	
1971–72	European Cup	Strømsgodset	(England) Arsenal	1–7	R1	—	
1971–72	Cup Winners' Cup	Lyn	(Portugal) Sporting CP	0–7	R1	—	
1971–72	UEFA Cup	Rosenborg	(Belgium) Lierse	4–4 (a)	R2	(Finland) HJK (4–0)	
1972–73	European Cup	Rosenborg	(Scotland) Celtic	2–5	R1	—	
1972–73	Cup Winners' Cup	Fredrikstad	(Socialist Federal Republic of Yugoslavia) Hajduk Split	0–2	R1	—	
1972–73	UEFA Cup	Viking	(Germany) 1. FC Köln	2–10	R2	(Iceland) ÍBV (1–0)	
1972–73	UEFA Cup	Lyn	(England) Tottenham Hotspur	3–12	R1	—	
1973–74	European Cup	Viking	(Czechoslovakia) Spartak Trnava	1–3	R1	—	
1973–74	Cup Winners' Cup	Brann	(Northern Ireland) Glentoran	0–2	R2	(Malta) Gżira (9–0)	
1973–74	UEFA Cup	Fredrikstad	(Soviet Union) Dynamo Kyiv	0–5	R1	—	
1973–74	UEFA Cup	Strømsgodset	(England) Leeds United	2–7	R1	—	
1974–75	European Cup	Viking	(Soviet Union) Ararat Yerevan	2–6	R1	—	
1974–75	Cup Winners' Cup	Strømsgodset	(England) Liverpool	0–12	R1	—	
1974–75	UEFA Cup	Rosenborg	(Scotland) Hibernian	3–12	R1	—	
1974–75	UEFA Cup	Start	(Sweden) Djurgården	1–7	R1	—	
1975–76	European Cup	Viking	(Belgium) Molenbeek	2–4	R1	—	
1975–76	Cup Winners' Cup	Skeid	(Poland) Stal Rzeszów	0–12	R1	—	
1975–76	UEFA Cup	Molde	(Sweden) Östers IF	1–6	R1	—	
1975–76	UEFA Cup	Vålerenga	(Republic of Ireland) Athlone	2–4	R1	—	
1976–77	European Cup	Viking	(Czechoslovakia) Baník Ostrava	2–3	R1	—	
1976–77	Cup Winners' Cup	Bodø/Glimt	(Italy) Napoli	0–3	R1	—	
1976–77	UEFA Cup	Brann	(England) Queens Park Rangers	1–11	R1	—	
1976–77	UEFA Cup	Start	(Austria) Wacker Innsbruck	1–7	R1	—	
1977–78	Cup Winners' Cup	Brann	(Netherlands) Twente	1–4	R2	(Iceland) Akranes (5–0)	
1977–78	European Cup	Lillestrøm	(Netherlands) Ajax	2–4	R1	—	
1977–78	UEFA Cup	Start	(Germany) Braunschweig	1–4	R2	(Iceland) Fram (8–0)	
1977–78	UEFA Cup	Mjøndalen	(Germany) Bayern Munich	0–12	R1	—	
1978–79	European Cup	Lillestrøm	Austria Wien	1–4	R2	(Northern Ireland) Linfield (1–0)	
1978–79	Cup Winners' Cup	Bodø/Glimt	(Italy) Internazionale	1–7	R2	Union Luxembourg (4–2)	
1978–79	UEFA Cup	Molde	(Soviet Union) Torpedo Moscow	3–7	R1	—	
1978–79	UEFA Cup	Start	(Denmark) Esbjerg	0–1	R1	—	
1979–80	European Cup	Start	(France) Strasbourg	1–6	R1	—	
1979–80	Cup Winners' Cup	Lillestrøm	(Scotland) Rangers	0–3	PR	—	
1979–80	UEFA Cup	Skeid	(England) Ipswich Town	1–10	R1	—	
1979–80	UEFA Cup	Viking	(Germany) Borussia Mönchengladbach	1–4	R1	—	
1980–81	European Cup	Viking	(Socialist Federal Republic of Yugoslavia) Red Star Belgrade	3–7	R1	—	
1980–81	Cup Winners' Cup	Haugar	(Wales) Newport	0–6	R2	(Switzerland) Sion (3–1)	
1980–81	UEFA Cup	Moss	(East Germany) 1. FC Magdeburg	3–5	R1	—	
1981–82	European Cup	Start	(Netherlands) AZ	1–4	R1	—	
1981–82	Cup Winners' Cup	Vålerenga	(Poland) Legia Warsaw	3–6	R1	—	
1981–82	UEFA Cup	Bryne	(Belgium) Winterslag	2–3	R1	—	
1982–83	European Cup	Vålerenga	(Romania) Dinamo București	3–4	PR	—	
1982–83	Cup Winners' Cup	Lillestrøm	(Socialist Federal Republic of Yugoslavia) Red Star Belgrade	0–7	R1	—	
1982–83	UEFA Cup	Viking	(Scotland) Dundee United	1–3	R2	(East Germany) Lokomotive Leipzig (3–3)	
1983–84	European Cup	Viking	(Socialist Federal Republic of Yugoslavia) Partizan	1–5	R1	—	
1983–84	Cup Winners' Cup	Brann	(Netherlands) NEC Nijmegen	1–2	R1	—	
1983–84	UEFA Cup	Bryne	(Belgium) Anderlecht	1–4	R1	—	
1984–85	European Cup	Vålerenga	(Czechoslovakia) Sparta Prague	0–4	R1	—	
1984–85	Cup Winners' Cup	Moss	(Germany) Bayern Munich	2–6	R1	—	
1984–85	UEFA Cup	Lillestrøm	(East Germany) Lokomotive Leipzig	3–7	R1	—	
1985–86	European Cup	Vålerenga	(Soviet Union) Zenit Leningrad	0–4	R1	—	
1985–86	Cup Winners' Cup	Fredrikstad	(Wales) Bangor City	1–1 (a)	R1	—	
1985–86	UEFA Cup	Viking	(Poland) Legia Warsaw	1–4	R1	—	
1986–87	European Cup	Rosenborg	(Socialist Federal Republic of Yugoslavia) Red Star Belgrade	1–7	R2	(Northern Ireland) Linfield (2–1)	
1986–87	Cup Winners' Cup	Lillestrøm	(Portugal) Benfica	1–4	R1	—	
1986–87	UEFA Cup	Vålerenga	(Belgium) Beveren	1–4	R1	—	
1987–88	European Cup	Lillestrøm	(France) Bordeaux	0–1	R2	(Northern Ireland) Linfield (5–3)	
1987–88	Cup Winners' Cup	Tromsø	(Scotland) St Mirren	0–1	R1	—	
1987–88	UEFA Cup	Mjøndalen	(Germany) Werder Bremen	1–5	R1	—	
1988–89	European Cup	Moss	(Spain) Real Madrid	0–4	R1	—	
1988–89	Cup Winners' Cup	Bryne	(Hungary) Békéscsaba	2–4	PR	—	
1988–89	UEFA Cup	Molde	(Belgium) Waregem	1–5	R1	—	
1989–90	European Cup	Rosenborg	(Belgium) Mechelen	0–5	R1	—	
1989–90	Cup Winners' Cup	Brann	(Italy) Sampdoria	0–3	R1	—	
1989–90	UEFA Cup	Lillestrøm	(Germany) Werder Bremen	1–5	R1	—	
1990–91	European Cup	Lillestrøm	(Belgium) Club Brugge	1–3	R1	—	
1990–91	Cup Winners' Cup	Viking	(Belgium) Liège	0–5	R1	—	
1990–91	UEFA Cup	Rosenborg	(Soviet Union) Chornomorets Odesa	3–4	R1	—	
1991–92	European Cup	Rosenborg	(Italy) Sampdoria	1–7	R1	—	
1991–92	Cup Winners' Cup	Fyllingen	(Spain) Atlético Madrid	2–8	R1	—	
1991–92	UEFA Cup	Tromsø	(Austria) Wacker Innsbruck	2–3	R1	—	
1992–93	Champions League	Viking	(Spain) Barcelona	0–1	R1	—	
1992–93	Cup Winners' Cup	Strømsgodset	(Israel) Hapoel Petah Tikva	0–4	PR	—	
1992–93	UEFA Cup	Rosenborg	(Russia) Dynamo Moscow	3–5	R1	—	
1993–94	Champions League	Rosenborg	Austria Wien	4–5	R1	(Luxembourg) Avenir Beggen (3–0)	
1993–94	Cup Winners' Cup	Lillestrøm	(Italy) Torino	2–3	R1	(Estonia) Nikol Tallinn (8–1)	
1993–94	UEFA Cup	Kongsvinger	(Italy) Juventus	1–3	R2	(Sweden) Öster (7–2)	
1994–95	Cup Winners' Cup	Bodø/Glimt	(Italy) Sampdoria	3–4	R1	(Latvia) Olimpija Rīga (6–0)	
1994–95	UEFA Cup	Lillestrøm	(France) Bordeaux	1–5	R2	(Ukraine) Shakhtar Donetsk (4–3)	
1994–95	UEFA Cup	Rosenborg	(Spain) Deportivo La Coruña	2–4 (a.e.t.)	R2	(Luxembourg) Grevenmacher (8–1)	
1995–96	Champions League	Rosenborg	(Russia) Spartak Moscow, (Poland) Legia Warszawa, (England) Blackburn Rovers	—	GS	(Turkey) Beşiktaş (4–3)	
1995–96	Cup Winners' Cup	Molde	(France) Paris Saint-Germain	2–6	R1	(Belarus) Dinamo-93 Minsk (3–2)	
1995–96	UEFA Cup	Lillestrøm	(Denmark) Brøndby	0–3	R2	(Estonia) Flora (4–1)	
1995–96	UEFA Cup	Viking	(France) Auxerre	1–2	R2	(Finland) Tampereen Pallo-Veikot (7–1)	
1996–97	Champions League	Rosenborg	(Italy) Juventus	1–3	QF	(Greece) Panathinaikos (3–1, a.e.t.), (Portugal) Porto, (Italy) Milan, (Sweden) IFK Göteborg	
1996–97	Cup Winners' Cup	Brann	(England) Liverpool	1–4	QF	(Republic of Ireland) Shelbourne (5–2), (Belgium) Cercle Brugge (3–6), (Netherlands) PSV Eindhoven (4–3)	
1996–97	UEFA Cup	Bodø/Glimt	(Turkey) Trabzonspor	2–5	R1	(Israel) Beitar Jerusalem (7–2)	
1996–97	UEFA Cup	Molde	(Georgia (country)) Dinamo Tbilisi	1–2	Q2	—	
1997–98	Champions League	Rosenborg	(Spain) Real Madrid, (Greece) Olympiacos, (Portugal) Porto	—	GS	(Hungary) MTK Budapest (4–1)	
1997–98	Cup Winners' Cup	Tromsø	(England) Chelsea	4–9	R2	(Croatia) Zagreb (6–5, a.e.t.)	
1997–98	UEFA Cup	Lillestrøm	(Netherlands) Twente	2–2 (a)	R1	(Belarus) Dinamo Minsk (3–0)	
1997–98	UEFA Cup	Brann	(Switzerland) Grasshopper	2–3	Q2	(Bulgaria) Naftex Burgas (4–4)	
1997–98	UEFA Cup	Viking	(Switzerland) Neuchâtel Xamax	2–4	Q2	(Serbia) Vojvodina (2–2, 5–4 pen.)	
1998–99	Champions League	Rosenborg	(Italy) Juventus, (Turkey) Galatasaray, (Spain) Athletic Bilbao	—	GS	(Belgium) Club Brugge (4–4, a)	
1998–99	Cup Winners' Cup	Vålerenga	(England) Chelsea	2–6	QF	(Romania) Rapid București (2–2, a), (Turkey) Beşiktaş (4–3)	
1998–99	UEFA Cup	Brann	(Germany) Werder Bremen	2–4	R1	(Lithuania) Žalgiris (1–0)	
1998–99	UEFA Cup	Strømsgodset	(England) Aston Villa	2–6	R1	(Israel) Hapoel Tel Aviv (1–1, 4–2 pen.)	
1998–99	UEFA Cup	Molde	(Bulgaria) CSKA Sofia	0–2	Q2	—	
1999–2000	Champions League	Rosenborg	(Germany) Bayern Munich, (Spain) Real Madrid, (Ukraine) Dynamo Kyiv	—	G2	(Netherlands) Feyenoord, (Germany) Borussia Dortmund, (Portugal) Boavista	
1999–2000	Champions League	Molde	(Spain) Real Madrid, (Portugal) Porto, (Greece) Olympiacos	—	GS	(Russia) CSKA Moscow (4–2), (Spain) Mallorca (1–1, a)	
1999–2000	UEFA Cup	Viking	(Germany) Werder Bremen	2–2 (a)	R2	(Andorra) Principat (18–0), (Portugal) Sporting CP (3–1)	
1999–2000	UEFA Cup	Bodø/Glimt	(Germany) Werder Bremen	1–6	R1	(Liechtenstein) Vaduz (3–1)	
1999–2000	UEFA Cup	Stabæk	(Spain) Deportivo La Coruña	1–2	R1	—	
2000–01	Champions League	Rosenborg	(Germany) Bayern Munich, (France) Paris Saint-Germain, (Sweden) Helsingborg	—	G1	(Republic of Ireland) Shelbourne (4–2), (Hungary) Dunaferr (4–3)	
2000–01	UEFA Cup	Rosenborg	(Spain) Alavés	2–4	R3	—	
2000–01	UEFA Cup	Lillestrøm	(Spain) Alavés	5–3	R2	(Northern Ireland) Glentoran (4–0), (Russia) Dynamo Moscow (4–3)	
2000–01	UEFA Cup	Brann	(Switzerland) Basel	6–7	R1	(Latvia) Liepājas Metalurgs (2–1)	
2000–01	UEFA Cup	Molde	(Spain) Rayo Vallecano	1–2	R1	—	
2001–02	Champions League	Rosenborg	(Italy) Juventus, (Portugal) Porto, (Scotland) Celtic	—	G1	(Slovakia) Inter Bratislava (7–3)	
2001–02	Champions League	Brann	(Bulgaria) Levski Sofia	1–1 (a)	Q2	—	
2001–02	UEFA Cup	Viking	(Germany) Hertha BSC	0–3	R2	(Bosnia and Herzegovina) Brotnjo (2–1), (Scotland) Kilmarnock (4–3)	
2001–02	UEFA Cup	Odd Grenland	(Sweden) Helsingborg	3–3 (a)	R1	—	
2002–03	Champions League	Rosenborg	(Italy) Internazionale, (Netherlands) Ajax, (France) Lyon	—	G1	(Denmark) Brøndby (4–2)	
2002–03	Champions League	Lillestrøm	(Bosnia and Herzegovina) Željezničar	0–2	Q2	—	
2002–03	UEFA Cup	Viking	(Spain) Celta Vigo	1–4	R2	(England) Chelsea (5–4)	
2002–03	UEFA Cup	Stabæk	(Belgium) Anderlecht	2–2 (a)	R1	(Northern Ireland) Linfield (5–1)	
2002–03	UEFA Cup	Brann	(Lithuania) Sūduva	4–6	QR	—	
2003–04	Champions League	Rosenborg	(Spain) Deportivo La Coruña	0–1	Q3	(Republic of Ireland) Bohemian (5–0)	
2003–04	UEFA Cup	Rosenborg	(Portugal) Benfica	2–2 (a)	R3	(Latvia) Ventspils (10–1), (Serbia) Red Star Belgrade (1–0)	
2003–04	UEFA Cup	Vålerenga	(England) Newcastle United	2–4	R3	(Austria) Grazer AK (1–1, a), (Poland) Wisła Kraków (0–0, 4–3 pen.)	
2003–04	UEFA Cup	Molde	(Portugal) Benfica	1–5	R2	(Faroe Islands) Klaksvík (6–0), (Portugal) Leiria (3–2)	
2003–04	UEFA Cup	Lyn	(Greece) PAOK	1–3	R1	(Faroe Islands) Runavík (9–1)	
2004–05	Champions League	Rosenborg	(England) Arsenal, (Netherlands) PSV Eindhoven, (Greece) Panathinaikos	—	G1	(Moldova) Sheriff Tiraspol (4–1), (Israel) Maccabi Haifa (5–3, a.e.t.)	
2004–05	UEFA Cup	Bodø/Glimt	(Turkey) Beşiktaş	1–2	R1	(Estonia) Levadia Tallinn (3–3, 8–7 pen.)	
2004–05	UEFA Cup	Odd Grenland	(Netherlands) Feyenoord	1–5	R1	(Lithuania) Ekranas (4–3)	
2004–05	UEFA Cup	Stabæk	(France) Sochaux	0–9	R1	(Finland) Haka (4–3)	
2005–06	Champions League	Rosenborg	(France) Lyon, (Spain) Real Madrid, (Greece) Olympiacos	—	G1	(Romania) Steaua București (4–3)	
2005–06	Champions League	Vålerenga	(Belgium) Club Brugge	1–1 (4–3 pen.)	Q3	(Finland) Haka (5–1)	
2005–06	UEFA Cup	Vålerenga	(Romania) Steaua București	1–6	R1	—	
2005–06	UEFA Cup	Rosenborg	(Russia) Zenit Saint Petersburg	1–3	R32	—	
2005–06	UEFA Cup	Viking	(France) Monaco, (Germany) Hamburger SV, (Czech Republic) Slavia Prague, (Bulgaria) CSKA Sofia	—	GS	(Northern Ireland) Portadown (3–1), (Wales) Rhyl (3–1), Austria Wien (2–2, a)	
2005–06	UEFA Cup	Tromsø	(France) Strasbourg, (Italy) Roma, (Switzerland) Basel, (Serbia) Red Star Belgrade	—	GS	(Denmark) Esbjerg (1–1, 3–2 pen.), (Turkey) Galatasaray (2–1)	
2005–06	UEFA Cup	Brann	(Russia) Lokomotiv Moscow	3–5	R1	(Finland) Allianssi Vantaa (2–0)	
2006–07	Champions League	Vålerenga	(Czech Republic) Mladá Boleslav	3–5	Q2	—	
2006–07	UEFA Cup	Start	(Netherlands) Ajax	2–9	R1	(Faroe Islands) Skála (4–0), (Republic of Ireland) Drogheda United (1–1, 11–10 pen.)	
2006–07	UEFA Cup	Molde	(Scotland) Rangers	0–2	R1	(Latvia) Skonto (2–1)	
2006–07	UEFA Cup	Brann	(Sweden) Åtvidaberg	4–4 (a)	Q2	(Northern Ireland) Glentoran (2–0)	
2006–07	UEFA Cup	Lyn	(Estonia) Flora	1–1 (a)	Q1	—	
2007–08	Champions League	Rosenborg	(England) Chelsea, (Germany) Schalke 04, (Spain) Valencia	—	GS	(Kazakhstan) Astana (10–2), (Finland) Tampere United (5–0)	
2007–08	UEFA Cup	Rosenborg	(Italy) Fiorentina	3–1	R32	—	
2007–08	UEFA Cup	Brann	(England) Everton	1–8	R32	(Wales) Carmarthen (14–3), (Lithuania) Sūduva (6–4), (Belgium) Club Brugge (2–2, a), (Germany) Hamburger SV, (Switzerland) Basel, (France) Rennes, (Croatia) Dinamo Zagreb	
2007–08	UEFA Cup	Vålerenga	Austria Wien	2–4	R1	(Estonia) Flora (2–0), (Lithuania) Ekranas (7–1)	
2007–08	UEFA Cup	Fredrikstad	(Sweden) Hammarby	2–3	Q2	—	
2007–08	UEFA Cup	Lillestrøm	(Luxembourg) Käerjéng	2–2 (a)	Q1	—	
2008–09	Champions League	Brann	(France) Marseille	1–3	Q3	(Latvia) Ventspils (2–2, a)	
2008–09	UEFA Cup	Brann	(Spain) Deportivo La Coruña	2–2 (3–2 pen.)	GS	—	
2008–09	UEFA Cup	Rosenborg	(France) Saint-Étienne, (Spain) Valencia, (Denmark) Copenhagen, (Belgium) Club Brugge	—	GS	(Sweden) Djurgården (6–2), (Denmark) Brøndby (5–3)	
2008–09	UEFA Cup	Viking	(Finland) Honka	1–2	Q2	(Lithuania) Vėtra (2–1)	
2008–09	UEFA Cup	Lillestrøm	(Denmark) Copenhagen	3–7	Q2	—	
2008–09	UEFA Cup	Stabæk	(France) Rennes	2–3	Q2	—	
2009–10	Champions League	Stabæk	(Denmark) Copenhagen	1–3	Q3	(Albania) Tirana (5–1)	
2009–10	Europa League	Stabæk	(Spain) Valencia	1–7	PO	—	
2009–10	Europa League	Tromsø	(Spain) Athletic Bilbao	3–4	PO	(Belarus) Dinamo Minsk (4–1), (Croatia) Slaven (4–1)	
2009–10	Europa League	Fredrikstad	(Poland) Lech Poznań	3–7	Q3	—	
2009–10	Europa League	Vålerenga	(Greece) PAOK	2–2 (a)	Q3	—	
2009–10	Europa League	Rosenborg	(Azerbaijan) Qarabağ	0–1 (a)	Q3	(Faroe Islands) Runavík (6–1)	
2010–11	Champions League	Rosenborg	(Denmark) Copenhagen	2–2 (a)	PO	(Northern Ireland) Linfield (2–0), (Sweden) AIK (4–0)	
2010–11	Europa League	Rosenborg	(Germany) Bayer Leverkusen, (Greece) Aris, (Spain) Atlético Madrid	—	GS	—	
2010–11	Europa League	Molde	(Germany) VfB Stuttgart	4–5	Q3	(Latvia) Jelgava (2–2, a)	
2010–11	Europa League	Aalesund	(Scotland) Motherwell	1–4	Q3	—	
2010–11	Europa League	Stabæk	(Belarus) Dnepr Mogilev	3–3 (a)	Q2	—	
2011–12	Champions League	Rosenborg	(Czech Republic) Viktoria Plzeň	2–4	Q3	(Iceland) Breiðablik (5–2)	
2011–12	Europa League	Rosenborg	(Cyprus) AEK Larnaca	1–2	PO	—	
2011–12	Europa League	Aalesund	(Netherlands) AZ	2–7	PO	(Wales) Neath (6–1), (Hungary) Ferencváros (4–3, a.e.t.), (Sweden) Elfsborg (5–1)	
2011–12	Europa League	Vålerenga	(Greece) PAOK	0–5	Q3	(Armenia) Mika (2–0)	
2011–12	Europa League	Strømsgodset	(Spain) Atlético Madrid	1–4	Q3	—	
2011–12	Europa League	Tromsø	(Hungary) Paks	1–4	Q2	(Latvia) Daugava (7–1)	
2012–13	Champions League	Molde	(Switzerland) Basel	1–4	Q3	(Latvia) Ventspils (4–1)	
2012–13	Europa League	Molde	(Romania) Steaua București, (Germany) VfB Stuttgart, (Denmark) Copenhagen	—	GS	(Netherlands) Heerenveen (4–1)	
2012–13	Europa League	Rosenborg	(Ukraine) Metalist Kharkiv, (Germany) Bayer Leverkusen, (Austria) Rapid Wien	—	GS	(Northern Ireland) Crusaders (4–0), (Kazakhstan) Ordabasy (4–3), (Poland) Legia Warsaw (3–2), (Switzerland) Servette (3–2), (Poland) Legia Warsaw (3–2)	
2012–13	Europa League	Aalesund	(Cyprus) APOEL	1–3	Q3	(Albania) Tirana (6–1)	
2012–13	Europa League	Tromsø	(Serbia) Partizan	3–3 (a)	PO	(Ukraine) Metalurh Donetsk (2–1), (Slovenia) Olimpija Ljubljana (1–0, a.e.t.)	
2012–13	Europa League	Stabæk	(Finland) JJK	3–4	Q1	—	
2013–14	Champions League	Molde	(Poland) Legia Warsaw	1–1	Q3	(Republic of Ireland) Sligo Rovers (3–0)	
2013–14	Europa League	Molde	(Russia) Rubin Kazan	0–5	PO	—	—
2013–14	Europa League	Tromsø	(England) Tottenham Hotspur, (Russia) Anzhi Makhachkala, (Moldova) Sheriff Tiraspol	—	GS	(Slovenia) Celje (3–2), (Azerbaijan) Inter Baku (2–1), (Luxembourg) Differdange 03 (1–1, 4–3 pen.), (Turkey) Beşiktaş (2–3)	
2013–14	Europa League	Strømsgodset	(Czech Republic) Jablonec	2–5	Q3	(Hungary) Debrecen (5–2)	
2013–14	Europa League	Hødd	(Kazakhstan) Aktobe	1–2	Q2	—	
2013–14	Europa League	Rosenborg	(Scotland) St Johnstone	1–2	Q2	(Northern Ireland) Crusaders (9–3)	
2014–15	Champions League	Strømsgodset	(Romania) Steaua București	0–3	Q2	—	
2014–15	Europa League	Haugesund	(Bosnia and Herzegovina) Sarajevo	2–3	Q2	(Wales) Airbus UK Broughton (3–2)	
2014–15	Europa League	Molde	(Ukraine) Zorya Luhansk	2–3	Q3	(Slovenia) Gorica (5–2)	
2014–15	Europa League	Rosenborg	(Turkey) Karabükspor	1–1 (a)	Q3	(Latvia) Jelgava (6–0), (Republic of Ireland) Sligo Rovers (4–3)	
2014–15	Europa League	Tromsø	(Faroe Islands) Víkingur Gøta	1–2	Q2	(Estonia) Santos Tartu (13–1)	
2015–16	Champions League	Molde	(Croatia) Dinamo Zagreb	3–3 (a)	Q3	(Armenia) Pyunik (5–1)	
2015–16	Europa League	Molde	(Spain) Sevilla	1–3	R32	(Belgium) Standard Liège (3–3, a), (Turkey) Fenerbahçe, (Scotland) Celtic, (Netherlands) Ajax	
2015–16	Europa League	Odd	(Germany) Borussia Dortmund	5–11	PO	(Moldova) Sheriff Tiraspol (3–0), (Republic of Ireland) Shamrock Rovers (4–1), (Sweden) Elfsborg (3–2)	
2015–16	Europa League	Rosenborg	(France) Saint-Étienne, (Ukraine) Dnipro Dnipropetrovsk, (Italy) Lazio	—	GS	(Faroe Islands) Víkingur (2–0), (Iceland) KR (4–0), (Hungary) Debrecen (6–3), (Romania) Steaua București (3–1)	
2015–16	Europa League	Strømsgodset	(Croatia) Hajduk Split	0–4	Q3	(Albania) Partizani (4–1), (Czech Republic) Mladá Boleslav (2–2, a)	
2016–17	Champions League	Rosenborg	(Cyprus) APOEL	2–4	Q3	(Sweden) Norrköping (5–4)	
2016–17	Europa League	Rosenborg	Austria Wien	2–4	PO	—	
2016–17	Europa League	Odd	(Greece) PAS Giannina	3–4 (a.e.t.)	Q2	(Finland) Mariehamn (3–1)	
2016–17	Europa League	Stabæk	(Wales) Connah's Quay Nomads	0–1	Q1	—	
2016–17	Europa League	Strømsgodset	(Denmark) SønderjyskE	3–4 (a.e.t.)	Q2	—	
2017–18	Champions League	Rosenborg	(Scotland) Celtic	0–1	Q3	(Republic of Ireland) Dundalk (3–2)	
2017–18	Europa League	Rosenborg	(Russia) Zenit Saint Petersburg, (Spain) Real Sociedad, (North Macedonia) Vardar	—	GS	(Netherlands) Ajax (4–2)	
2017–18	Europa League	Brann	(Slovakia) Ružomberok	1–2	Q2	—	
2017–18	Europa League	Haugesund	(Poland) Lech Poznań	3–4	Q2	(Northern Ireland) Coleraine (7–0)	
2017–18	Europa League	Odd	(Croatia) Dinamo Zagreb	1–2	Q3	(Northern Ireland) Ballymena United (5–0), (Liechtenstein) Vaduz (2–0)	
2018–19	Champions League	Rosenborg	(Scotland) Celtic	1–3	Q2	(Iceland) Valur (3–2)	
2018–19	Europa League	Rosenborg	(Austria) Red Bull Salzburg, (Scotland) Celtic, (Germany) Leipzig	—	GS	(Republic of Ireland) Cork City (5–0), (North Macedonia) Shkëndija (5−1)	
2018–19	Europa League	Lillestrøm	(Austria) LASK	1–6	Q2	—	
2018–19	Europa League	Molde	(Russia) Zenit Saint Petersburg	3–4	PO	(Northern Ireland) Glenavon (6–3), (Albania) Laçi (5–0), (Scotland) Hibernian (3–0)	
2018–19	Europa League	Sarpsborg 08	(Belgium) Genk, (Sweden) Malmö FF, (Turkey) Beşiktaş	—	GS	(Iceland) ÍBV (6–0), (Switzerland) St. Gallen (2–2, ag), (Croatia) Rijeka (2–1), (Israel) Maccabi Tel Aviv (4–3)	
2019–20	Champions League	Rosenborg	(Croatia) Dinamo Zagreb	1–3	PO	(Northern Ireland) Linfield (6–0), (Belarus) BATE Borisov (3–2), (Slovenia) Maribor (6–2)	
2019–20	Europa League	Rosenborg	(Austria) LASK, (Portugal) Sporting CP, (Netherlands) PSV Eindhoven	—	GS	—	
2019–20	Europa League	Brann	(Republic of Ireland) Shamrock Rovers	3–4	Q1	—	
2019–20	Europa League	Haugesund	(Netherlands) PSV Eindhoven	0–1	Q3	(Northern Ireland) Cliftonville (6–1), (Austria) Sturm Graz (3–2)	
2019–20	Europa League	Molde	(Serbia) Partizan	2–3	PO	(Iceland) KR (7–1), (Serbia) Čukarički (3–1), (Greece) Aris (4–3, a.e.t.)	
2020–21	Champions League	Molde	(Hungary) Ferencváros	3–3 (a)	PO	(Finland) KuPS (5–0), (Slovenia) Celje (2–1), (Azerbaijan) Qarabağ (6–5, pen.)	
2020–21	Europa League	Molde	(Spain) Granada	2–3	R16	(England) Arsenal, (Austria) Rapid Wien, (Republic of Ireland) Dundalk, (Germany) 1899 Hoffenheim (5–3)	
2020–21	Europa League	Bodø/Glimt	(Italy) Milan	2–3	Q3	(Lithuania) Kauno Žalgiris (6–1), (Lithuania) Žalgiris (3–1)	
2020–21	Europa League	Rosenborg	(Netherlands) PSV Eindhoven	0–2	PO	(Iceland) Breiðablik (4–2), (Latvia) Ventspils (5–1), (Turkey) Alanyaspor (1–0)	
2020–21	Europa League	Viking	(Scotland) Aberdeen	0–2	Q2	—	
2021–22	Champions League	Bodø/Glimt	(Poland) Legia Warsaw	2–5	Q1	—	
2021–22	Europa Conference League	Bodø/Glimt	(Italy) Roma	2–5	QF	(Lithuania) Žalgiris, (3–2) (Kosovo) Prishtina (3–2), (Iceland) Valur (6–0), (Italy) Roma, (Ukraine) Zorya Luhansk, (Bulgaria) CSKA Sofia, (Scotland) Cetlic (5–1), (Netherlands) AZ (4–3 a.e.t.)	
2021–22	Europa Conference League	Molde	(Turkey) Trabzonspor	4–4 (3–4p)	Q3	(Switzerland) Servette (3–2)	
2021–22	Europa Conference League	Rosenborg	(France) Rennes	1–5	PO	(Slovenia) Domžale (8–2), (Iceland) FH (6–1)	
2021–22	Europa Conference League	Vålerenga	(Belgium) Gent	2–4	Q2	—	
2022–23	Champions League	Bodø/Glimt	(Croatia) Dinamo Zagreb	2–4	PO	(Faroe Islands) KÍ Klaksvík (4–3), (Northern Ireland) Linfield (8–1), (Lithuania) Žalgiris (6–1)	
2022–23	Europa League	Bodø/Glimt	(England) Arsenal, (Netherlands) PSV Eindhoven, (Switzerland) Zürich	–	GS		
2022–23	Europa Conference League	Bodø/Glimt	(Poland) Lech Poznań	0–1	KPO		
2022–23	Europa Conference League	Molde	(Sweden) Djurgården, (Belgium) Gent, (Republic of Ireland) Shamrock Rovers	–	GS	(Sweden) Elfsborg (6–2), (Hungary) Kisvárda (5–2), (Austria) Wolfsberger AC (4–1)	
2022–23	Europa Conference League	Viking	(Romania) FCSB	3–4	PO	(Czech Republic) Sparta Prague (2–1), (Republic of Ireland) Sligo Rovers (5–2)	
2022–23	Europa Conference League	Lillestrøm	(Belgium) Royal Antwerp	1–5	Q3	(Finland) SJK (6–2)	
2023–24	Champions League	Molde	(Turkey) Galatasaray	3–5	PO	(Finland) HJK Helsinki (2–1), (Faroe Islands) KÍ Klaksvik (3–2)	
2023–24	Europa League	Molde	(Germany) Bayer Leverkusen, (Azerbaijan) Qarabağ, (Sweden) BK Häcken	–	GS		
2023–24	Europa Conference League	Molde	(Belgium) Club Brugge	2–4	R16	(Poland) Legia Warsaw (6-2)	
2023–24	Europa Conference League	Bodø/Glimt	(Netherlands) Ajax	3–4 (a.e.t.)	KPO	(Czech Republic) Bohemians 1905 (7–2), (Armenia) Pyunik (6–0), (Romania) Sepsi OSK (5–4 a.e.t.), (Belgium) Club Brugge, (Turkey) Beşiktaş, (Switzerland) Lugano	
2023–24	Europa Conference League	Rosenborg	(Scotland) Heart of Midlothian	3–4	Q3	(Northern Ireland) Crusaders (5–4)	
2023–24	Europa Conference League	Brann	(Netherlands) AZ	4–4 (5–6 p)	PO	(Portugal) Arouca (4–3)	
2024–25	Champions League	Bodø/Glimt	(Serbia) Red Star Belgrade	2–3	PO	(Latvia) RFS (7–1), (Poland) Jagiellonia Białystok (5–1)	
2024–25	Europa League	Bodø/Glimt	(England) Tottenham Hotspur	1–5	SF	(Portugal) Porto, (Belgium) Union Saint-Gilloise, (Portugal) Braga, (Azerbaijan) Qarabağ, (England) Manchester United, (Turkey) Beşiktaş, (Israel) Maccabi Tel Aviv, (France) Nice, (Netherlands) Twente (6–4 a.e.t.), (Greece) Olympiacos (4–2), (Italy) Lazio (3–3 3–2 p)	
2024–25	Europa League	Molde	(Sweden) Elfsborg	1–1 (2–4 p)	PO	(Denmark) Silkeborg (5–4), (Belgium) Cercle Brugge (3–1)	
2024–25	Conference League	Molde	(Poland) Legia Warsaw	3–4	R16	(Northern Ireland) Larne, (Belgium) Gent, (Poland) Jagiellonia Białystok, (Cyprus) APOEL, (Finland) HJK Helsinki, (Czech Republic) Mladá Boleslav, (Republic of Ireland) Shamrock Rovers (1-1 5-4 p)	
2024–25	Conference League	Brann	(Kazakhstan) Astana	2–3	PO	(Netherlands) Go Ahead Eagles (2–1), (Scotland) St Mirren (4–2)	
2024–25	Conference League	Tromsø	(Scotland) Kilmarnock	2–3	Q3	(Finland) KuPS (2–0)	
2025–26	Champions League	Bodø/Glimt	(Portugal) Sporting	–	R16	(Austria) Sturm Graz (6–2), (Czech Republic) Slavia Prague, (England) Tottenham Hotspur, (Turkey) Galatasaray, (France) Monaco, (Italy) Juventus, (Germany) Borussia Dortmund, (England) Manchester City, (Spain) Atlético Madrid, (Italy) Inter Milan (5-2)	
2025–26	Champions League	Brann	(Austria) Red Bull Salzburg	2–5	Q2		
2025–26	Europa League	Brann	(France) Lille, (Netherlands) Utrecht, (Scotland) Rangers, (Italy) Bologna, (Greece) PAOK, (Turkey) Fenerbahçe, (Denmark) Midtjylland, (Austria) Sturm Graz	–	KPO	(Sweden) Häcken (2–1), (Cyprus) AEK Larnaca (6–1)	
2025–26	Europa League	Fredrikstad	(Denmark) Midtjylland	1–5	Q3		
2025–26	Conference League	Fredrikstad	(England) Crystal Palace	0–1	PO		
2025–26	Conference League	Rosenborg	(Germany) Mainz 05	3–5	PO	(Lithuania) Banga (7–0), (Sweden) Hammarby IF (1–0)	
2025–26	Conference League	Viking	(Turkey) İstanbul Başakşehir	2–4	Q3	(Slovenia) Koper (12–3)	

On 30 August 2013, Beşiktaş was disqualified from the 2013–14 UEFA Europa League as per final ruling by the Court of Arbitration for Sport. They were replaced in the group stage draw by Tromsø, which lost to Beşiktaş in the play-off round.
