= Arthur O. Sandved =

Norwegian philologist (1931–2021)

Arthur O. Sandved (2 February 1931 – 10 April 2021) was a Norwegian philologist.

== Early life ==
He was a son of a carpenter in Bryne. In 1951 he graduated from Rogaland Landsgymnas. He married Ruth Øgaard in August 1953 in Bryne and had three daughters. They took up residence at Billingstad.

== Career ==
Sandved took the cand.philol. degree at the University of Oslo in 1959, was a lecturer in English philology at the Norwegian College of Teaching in Trondheim from 1959 to 1963. He then took up the same position at the University of Oslo, where he took the dr.philos. degree in 1968. He was a docent before serving as professor from 1974. He sat on the Academic College (the university board) from 1982 to 1985, and was head of his Institute in 1984–87 and 1990–95. Among his output was a two-volume work on the history of English as a subject at the University of Oslo.

Sandved was a fellow of the Norwegian Academy of Science and Letters and the Norwegian Academy. He was a member of the Norwegian Language Council for four years in the 1990s. Sandved favoured the Riksmål written standard of Norwegian. Sandved sat on the lexicographic committee of the Norwegian Academy, revising Norsk Riksmålsordbok. As a translator, he was noted for translating five Shakespeare plays as well as Geoffrey Chaucer's Canterbury Tales and John Milton's Paradise Lost.

In 1979 he joined the translation committee of the Norwegian Bible Society, furthermore becoming a deputy board member of the society in 1980. He was involved in his local Holmen Church. A conservative, he was elected to Asker municipal council for the Conservative Party, but resigned his party membership when the Conservative Party accepted abortion. He also supported European integration and was active in the European Movement. He died in April 2021, aged 90.
