= Frank Tandberg =

Norwegian convicted criminal and crime novelist (1959–2021)

- Born: 1959; Ålesund, Norway
- Died: February 2, 2021 (aged 61–62); Torrevieja, Spain
- Occupation(s): Crime novelist Pimp (previously)

Jarl Frank Tandberg (1959 – 2 February 2021), who published under the name J. F. Johnson Tandberg, was a Norwegian convicted criminal and crime novelist.

He was born in Ålesund, but grew up in Bergen from age 2. At age 18 he started as a bartender, and in the 1980s and 1990s became a night club owner and brothel owner. He was convicted for the first time in 1981, on various counts in Copenhagen, and was convicted of pimping for the first time in 1988. Subsequently, he supposedly took up writing in Ullersmo Prison. In parts of the press Tandberg was dubbed "Hallik-Frank" ("Frank the Pimp"). In 1990 Tandberg shot debt collector Espen Lie in the thigh with a 9mm pistol, of which he was acquitted, but also stole a getaway car for which he was convicted of grand theft auto. He was later convicted several times of violence.

Tandberg released the novels Nattens joker in 1995, Løgnernes paradis in 1998, and Siste tog øst in 2002, all on Kolon forlag. In 2002 he left Kolon to supposedly release novels on an independent publishing house Barberblad. He also caused a ruckus in the Norwegian Authors' Union with several libellous attacks.

Nattens joker was reviewed in Norway's largest newspapers VG, Dagbladet and Aftenposten; the largest regional newspapers Bergens Tidende, Adresseavisen and Fædrelandsvennen; and other Oslo newspapers such as Klassekampen, Arbeiderbladet and Morgenbladet. In 2009 Nattens joker was included on Dagbladet's list of Norway's top 25 crime novels of all time. Frank Tandberg died in February 2021 in Torrevieja, Spain.
