= Elbjørg Fjære =

Norwegian politician (1933–2021)

Elbjørg Fjære (12 May 1933 – 2 August 2021) was a Norwegian politician for the Progress Party.

She served as a deputy representative to the Parliament of Norway from Oslo during the terms 1973–1977 and 1981–1985. In total she met during 22 days of parliamentary session.
