= Lotte Sandberg =

Norwegian art historian and journalist (1956–2021)

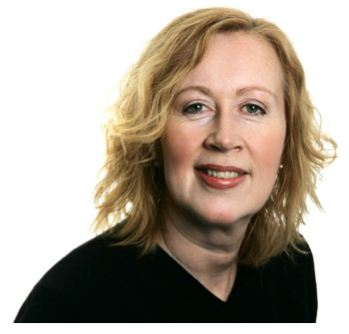
- Born: 1 October 1956; Bodø, Norway
- Died: 11 April 2021 (aged 64)
- Education: University of Bergen (1987), Oslo School of Architecture and Design (2008)
- Occupations: Art historian and Journalist

Lotte Sandberg (1 October 1956 – 11 April 2021) was a Norwegian art historian and journalist. Between 1988 and 1996, Sandberg was co-editor of the Nordic art magazine SIKSI (published by the Nordic Council of Ministers / Nordic Art Center). She was author of the special issue on Norwegian contemporary art (issue 4, 1994). In 1997, she was part of the editorial board of the Norwegian Art Yearbook. She was editor of Billedkunst from 1991 to 1995 and editor of Norsk kunstårbok in 1998 and 1999. A collection of her critiques were issued in 2018, selected by Regine Stokstad.

Sandberg held an MS from the University of Bergen (1987) with the main thesis 'The Italian Transavantgarde - an analysis of the international breakthrough'. She also had a master's degree in urbanism from the Oslo School of Architecture and Design (AHO) from 2008.

Sandberg died on 11 April 2021, aged 64.

== Selected works ==
- Alle snakker om museet. Nasjonalmuseet for kunst fra visjon til virkelighet. Oslo: Pax. 2008. ISBN 9788253031460. OCLC 320951193.
- Kritikker. Selections by Regine Stokstad. Oslo: Scandinavian Academic Press. 2018. ISBN 9788230402276. OCLC 1132683965.
