= Laila Steindal =

Norwegian politician (1932–2021)

Laila Steindal (7 December 1932 – 2 August 2021) was a Norwegian politician for the Centre Party.

She served as a deputy representative to the Parliament of Norway from Sogn og Fjordane during the terms 1981–1985 and 1985–1989. In total, she participated in 172 days of parliamentary sessions. She was also deputy mayor of Flora Municipality and a member of the Sogn og Fjordane county council.

Her daughter also became a local Centre Party politician.
