= Ulla Nævestad =

Norwegian politician (1945–2021)

Ulla Nævestad (12 September 1945 – 26 July 2021) was a Norwegian politician for the Conservative Party.

She served as a deputy representative to the Parliament of Norway from Buskerud during the term 1989–1993. In total she met during 61 days of parliamentary session. She served as mayor of Lier from 1995 to 2011.
