= Roy Strandbakke =

Norwegian footballer (1930–2021)

Personal information
- Full name: Roy Astor Strandbakke
- Date of birth: 12 October 1930
- Place of birth: Raufoss, Norway
- Date of death: 22 April 2021 (aged 90)
- Position: Midfielder

Senior career*
Years	Team	Apps	(Gls)
1948–1970	Raufoss		

International career
1953–1956	Norway B	8	(3)
1953–1957	Norway	2	(0)
- * Club domestic league appearances and goals

Roy Astor Strandbakke (12 October 1930 – 22 April 2021) was a Norwegian footballer who played as a midfielder for Raufoss IL, amassing 629 games across all competitions. He represented Norway as a B and senior international.

He died on 22 April 2021 at the age of 90.
