= Jarle Benum =

Norwegian politician (1928–2021)

Jarle Benum (26 April 1928 - 15 July 2021) was a Norwegian politician for the Liberal Party.

He was born in Sparbu Municipality and served as a deputy representative to the Norwegian Parliament from the county of Nord-Trøndelag during the terms 1965–1969, 1969–1973 and 1973–1977.

He was deputy chairiman of the board of Norges Kooperative Landsforening (NKL, lit. 'Norwegian Cooperative Association', now called Coop Norge) from 1962-1986 and chairman of the board and president from 1986-1994.

Benum was a farmer by occupation and was also involved in local politics in Verdal Municipality from 1959 to 1979.

He chaired the regional chapter of the Young Liberals from 1956 to 1960, the last two years as member of the national board. He chaired the county chapter of the Liberal Party from 1972 to 1973.
