= Hans Kristian Gaarder =

Norwegian conspiracy theorist (1960–2021)

- Born: 30 November 1960
- Died: 6 April 2021 (aged 60)
- Cause of death: COVID-19

Hans Kristian Gaarder (30 November 1960 – 6 April 2021) was a Norwegian conspiracy theorist and COVID-19 denialist who died in 2021 at age 60 after becoming infected with COVID-19. He lived in Gran Municipality in Hadeland, Norway. Prior to his death, he had hosted a number of illegal gatherings. Gaarder had previously been involved in conspiracy theories related to swine flu and the Illuminati.

He is believed to have been one of the creators of the Norwegian online alternative-news magazine "Nyhetsspeilet" ("The News Mirror").
