= Audun Dybdahl =

Norwegian historian and professor (1944–2021)

- Born: 10 September 1944
- Died: 22 June 2021
- Awards: Member of the Royal Norwegian Society of Sciences and Letters; Scandinavian University Press Academic Journal Prize
- Scientific career
- Fields: History
- Institutions: Norwegian University of Science and Technology
- Thesis: Jordeiendomsforhold og godseiere i Trøndelag (1980)

Audun Dybdahl (born 10 September 1944, died 22 June 2021) was a Norwegian historian of the Middle Ages. He was professor of history at the Norwegian University of Science and Technology (NTNU).

== Career and work ==
Audun Dybdahl studied at the universities of Oslo and Trondheim, and earned his cand.philol. degree in 1968 and his dr.philos. degree in 1980 with a dissertation on mediaeval estate owners in Trøndelag. He was a specialist on Norwegian mediaeval history, and his major works included Fosens historie, Trøndelags historie and Klima, uår og kriser i Norge gjennom de siste 1000 år, a monograph on changing climate and crises over the past millennium.

== Honours ==
He was elected as a member of the Royal Norwegian Society of Sciences and Letters. He received the Article of the Year – Scandinavian University Press Academic Journal Prize in 2010.
