= 2007 SK Brann season =

Brann
2007 season
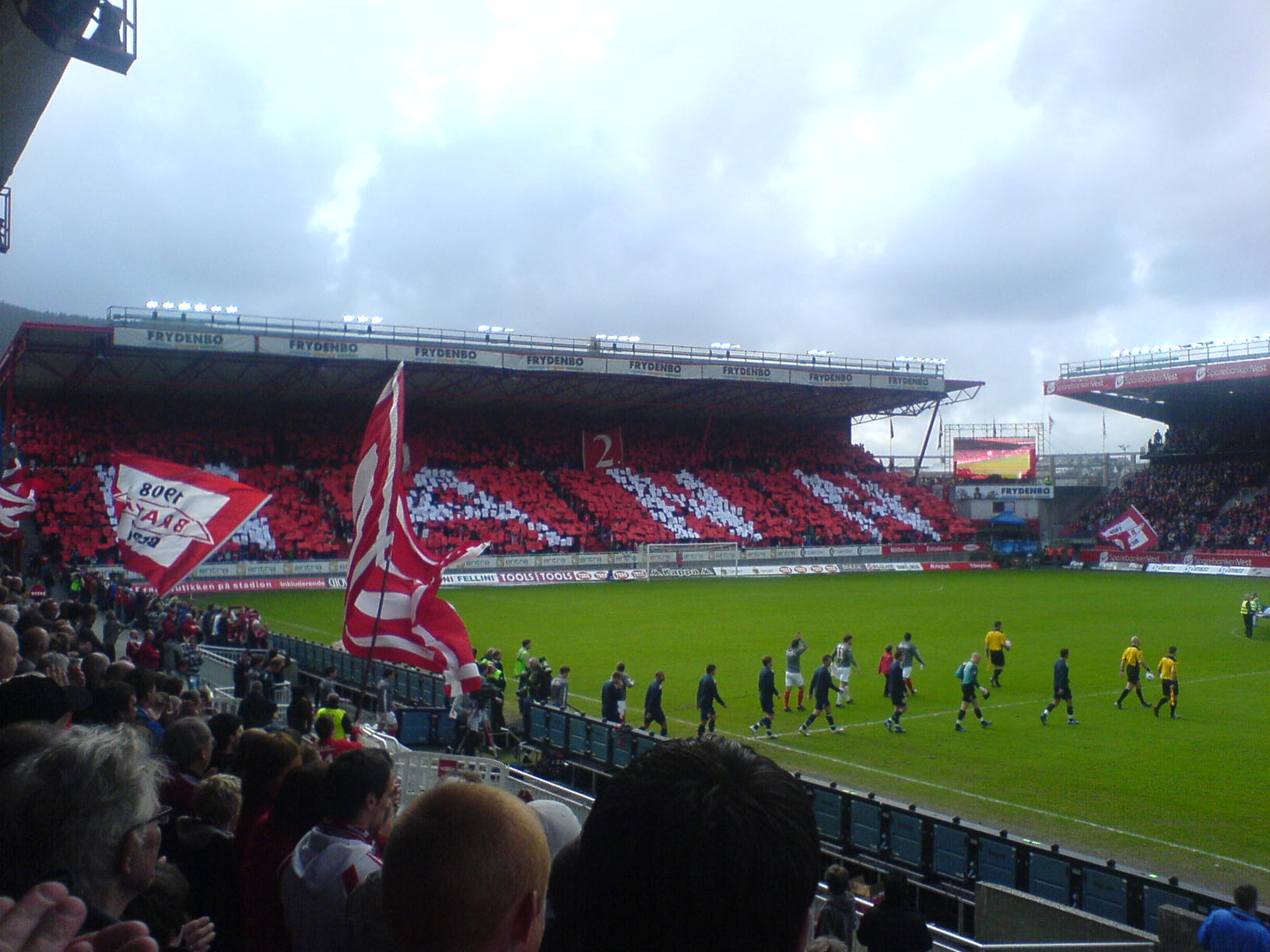
- Brann Stadion before the first home match against Strømsgodset
- Manager: Mons Ivar Mjelde
- Stadium: Brann Stadion
- Tippeligaen: 1st (champions)
- Norwegian Cup: 4th round
- UEFA Cup: Round of 32
- Royal League: Quarter finals
- Top goalscorer: League: Thorstein Helstad (22); All: Thorstein Helstad (27)

The 2007 season was SK Brann's 99th season and their 21st consecutive season in the Tippeligaen. Brann won the Tippeligaen in 2007. In the end, they finished 6 points ahead of their nearest rival, Stabæk. The team did cause a small sensation, and bitter disappointment among tens of thousands of Brann supporters who had gathered in Bergen to watch the game live, on 20 October, by losing to Ålesund 1–2 in the 24th of 26 rounds, a match where a draw would have set aside all doubt about Brann's league win. However two days later, Viking defeated Brann's last rival to the gold medals Stabæk with a 2–1 result, thereby securing Brann the first league championship since 1963.

Brann also qualified for the group stage of the UEFA Cup for the first time after beating Club Brugge from Belgium in the qualifier. The team won its first victory in the group stage of the UEFA Cup by defeating the Croatian side Dinamo Zagreb. On 21 December, the draw for the Round of 32 of The UEFA Cup was made and Brann will face a tough test against Premiership side Everton who won all four of the games in Group A. The first leg was lost at home 0–2, 13 February. The return leg is at Goodison Park a week later. They lost the return leg 6–1.

The Norwegian football cup ended for Brann in the 4th round, as in the 2006 season, where they were defeated by Viking.

== Information ==
Manager: Mons Ivar Mjelde
League: Tippeligaen
Shirt supplier: Kappa
Shirt sponsor: Sparebanken Vest
Average league attendance: 17,225
League: Champions
Norwegian Cup: 4th round (0-2 vs. Viking)
UEFA Cup: Qualified for Round of 32
Top goal scorer: Thorstein Helstad (22 in league, 27 in total)
Player of the year: Thorstein Helstad

== Season events ==
- 5 January: Brann signed the American fullback Ramiro Corrales from Ham-Kam. The deal was worth about NOK 2.000.000.
- 1 February: Charlie Miller's contract was terminated. Miller had stated that he couldn't play under the leadership of Mons Ivar Mjelde. He later signed with the Belgium side Lierse S.K.
- 9 February: Ramiro Corrales was deported from Norway after playing the whole 2006 season without a work permit. Brann appealed the decision, still hoping to keep Corrales in the squad.
- 12 February: Brann signed the young goalie Kenneth Udjus from F.K. Arendal.
- 25 February: Brann lost the seasons first official game 3–2 against OB in the Royal League. Both teams were already qualified for the quarter-finals.
- 26 February: Brann drew Brøndby IF in the Royal League quarter-finals. The match will take place at Brøndby Stadion on 1 March.
- 1 March: Brann was knocked out of the Royal League after a 0–3 defeat against Brøndby.
- 14 March: Ramiro Corrales was granted permanent residency in Norway, and will return to Bergen as soon as possible.
- 16 March: Rosenborg's Jan Gunnar Solli signed a 4-year deal with SK Brann
- 21 March: Steffen Haraldsen left Brann on a free transfer to Fyllingen. The young goalie never played for Brann's first team.
- 28 March: Migen Memelli sold to the Swedish team GAIS.
- 30 March: Arnaud Monkam and Kenneth Udjus were loaned out to Løv-Ham.
- 10 April: Brann opened the Premiership-season with a 1–0 victory against Stabæk away.
- 22 April: Brann crushed fellow Premiership contender Vålerenga 4–1 in their second homematch of the season. Bengt Sæternes made a huge impact by scoring a "golden hat-trick" in the first half, and securing the win with a header after 66 minutes. After three rounds, Brann is the only team in the Tippeligaen with all wins so far.
- 12 May: Brann took a lucky win against Sandefjord away, in their Premiership-match number 1000.
- 20 May: Brann advanced to the 2nd round of the Norwegian cup after an easy 5–0 win against Trio.
- 8 June: Trond Fredrik Ludvigsen was loaned out to Strømsgodset I.F. for the remainder of the 2007-season after the summer transferwindow opened on 1 July.
- 16 June: Brann was humiliated in Oslo after an 0–6 defeat against Lyn, in a match which saw Brann goalkeeper Håkon Opdal sent off after 43 minutes.
- 27 June: Brann advanced to the 4th round of the Norwegian cup after defeating Kopervik in a match where Robbie Winters scored a hat-trick. After this game Brann had won every match in the Norwegian men's football cup 2007 0–5.
- 1 July: Brann beat Tromsø IL 2–1 in their last game before the summer break. Brann ended up with 26 points, an 8-2-3 win-draw-loss ratio, 25 goals scored and 23 goals against. They were second only to Stabæk I.F. who had 28 points after half played season.
- 2 July: Brann brought Knut Walde back from Løv-Ham, 1.5 years after they sold him to the same club.
- 4 July: Brann signed the Swedish talent Joakim Sjöhage from IF Elfsborg. Helge Haugen left Brann after five and a half seasons to try to gain a regular spot on the team of Tromsø IL.
- 10 July: Erik Huseklepp came to an oral agreement with Stabæk I.F. Huseklepp's contract expires in October, and it's not yet known if he'll stay with Brann til then, or if he leaves the club this summer. Bengt Sæternes however, signed with Danish side OB, and have played his last match for Brann.
- 19 July: Brann crushed little Carmarthen Town F.C. 0–8 in the first leg of the First Qualifying Round of the 2007/08 UEFA cup.
- 22 July: Brann, number two in the Premiership beat the league-leader, Stabæk IF 3–0 at home. Brann took over the lead in the Premiership.
- 25 July: One man leaves, one man returns. Ardian Gashi signed with Fredrikstad after only one year in Brann. Hassan El Fakiri returns to Bergen, seven years after he left for AS Monaco.
- 25 July: Brann was knocked out of the Norwegian Cup after a 0–2 loss against Viking F.K.
- 2 August: Brann advanced to the Second Qualifying Round of the 2007/08 UEFA Cup after a 6-3 winn against Carmarthen Town F.C. in the second leg of the First Qualifying Round.
- 3 August: Brann are drawn against Lithuanian side FK Sūduva in the Second Qualifying Round of the 2007/08 UEFA Cup.
- 11 August: Brann beat Rosenborg 3–2 at home, and created a 10-point gap down to the defending Premiership-champions.
- 24 August: Azar Karadas signed a 3-year contract with Brann, 5 years after he left the club. The deal between Brann and Benfica is thought to be NOK 3 million.
- 30 August: Brann advanced to the First Round of the 2007/08 UEFA Cup after beating Sūduva 6–4 over two matches.
- 30 September: Brann took a large step towards the championship after crushing Lillestrøm S.K. 5–1 away, while their closest rivals, Stabæk I.F. stumbled against F.C. Lyn Oslo on Ullevaal Stadion, where they lost 2–3. With 4 matches remaining, Brann had a 7-point gap down to Viking F.K. on second place, a club they would meet in the second to last match.
- 4 October: Brann reached the Group stage of the 2007/08 UEFA Cup on away goals after beating Club Brugge 2–1 away in the return leg.

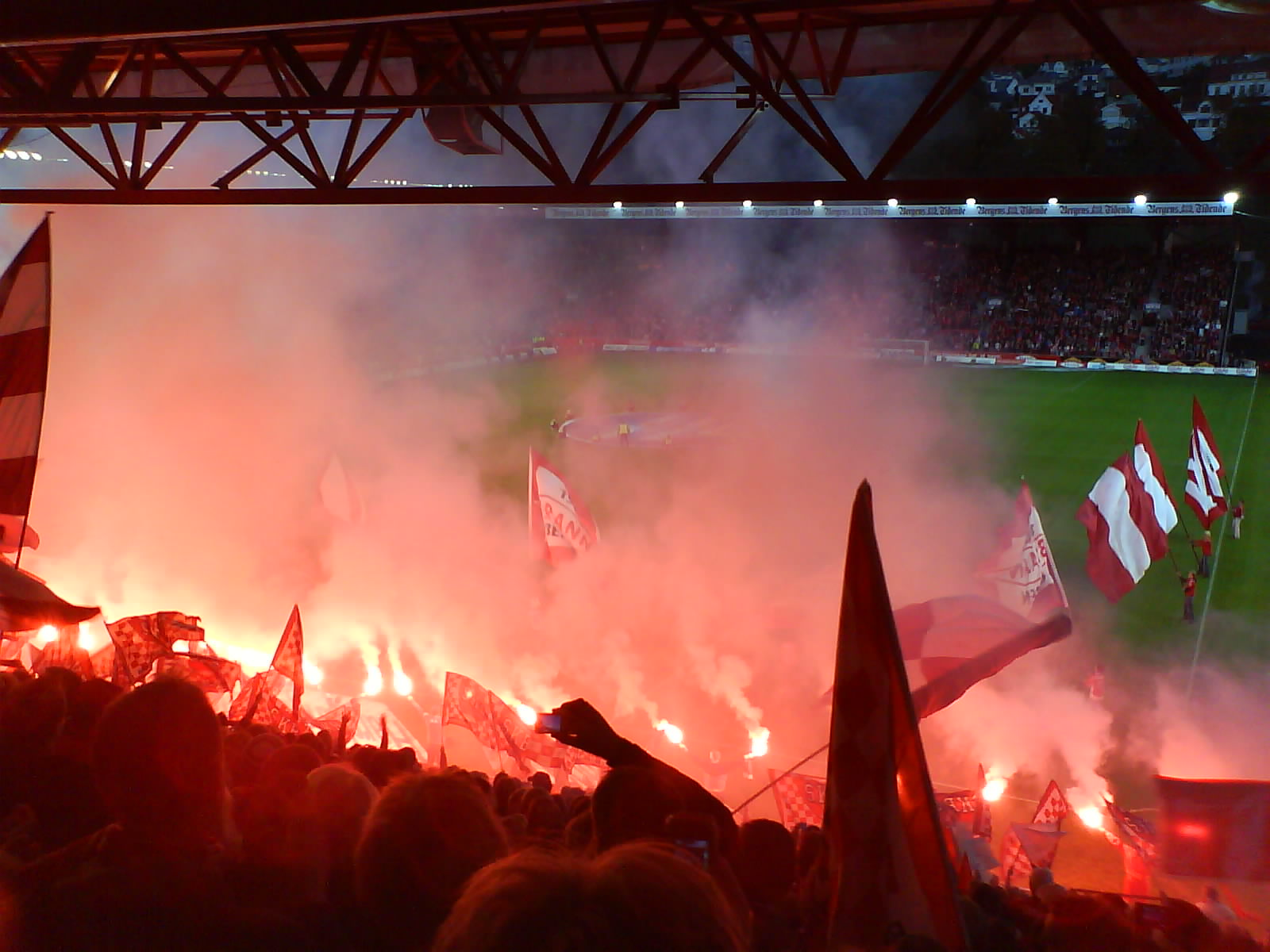

- 8 October: Brann had one hand and four fingers on the trophy after defeating F.C. Lyn Oslo 3–1 at home, thus creating a nine-point gap down to Stabæk I.F. with three rounds remaining. Brann only needed one point, or a Stabæk-loss/draw in one of the last three matches to win the league.
- 22 October: It became official. After Stabæk lost 1–2 against Viking F.K. away, Brann became the champions for the first time in 44 years. Brann had a nine-point gap down to Stabæk, with two rounds remaining, and could thus call themselves champions for the third time in history after their wins in 1962 and 1963.
- 25 October: Brann lost their first game in the Group stage of the 2007/08 UEFA Cup after a 0–1 defeat at home against Hamburger SV.
- 28 October: Brann defeated Viking 5–2 on Brann Stadion, and was awarded the trophy as the 2007 Tippeligaen Champions.
- 5 November: Martin Andresen notified the fans that he would leave Brann after the season. He signed a 3-year deal with Vålerenga on 6 November.

== Squad ==
As of July 2007. Matches and goals updated as of 28 October and is for league only. Note: Flags indicate national team as defined under FIFA eligibility rules; some limited exceptions apply. Players may hold more than one non-FIFA nationality.

No.	Pos.	Nation	Player
1	GK	(Norway) NOR	Johan Thorbjørnsen
3	DF	(Norway) NOR	Bjørn Dahl
4	DF	(Norway) NOR	Cato Guntveit
5	DF	(United States) USA	Ramiro Corrales
6	MF	(Norway) NOR	Helge Haugen (until July 2007)
6	DF	(Norway) NOR	Azar Karadas
7	MF	(Norway) NOR	Hassan El Fakiri
7	MF	(Norway) NOR	Ardian Gashi (until July 2007)
8	MF	(Norway) NOR	Martin Andresen (C)
9	MF	(Norway) NOR	Jan Gunnar Solli
10	FW	(Norway) NOR	Bengt Sæternes (until July 2007)
11	MF	(Norway) NOR	Petter Vaagan Moen
12	GK	(Norway) NOR	Håkon Opdal

No.	Pos.	Nation	Player
13	MF	(Norway) NOR	Erik Huseklepp
14	MF	(The Gambia) GAM	Tijan Jaiteh
15	DF	(Norway) NOR	Erlend Hanstveit
16	FW	(Sweden) SWE	Joakim Sjöhage
17	MF	(Norway) NOR	Eirik Bakke
18	DF	(Iceland) ISL	Ólafur Örn Bjarnason
19	MF	(Norway) NOR	Nicolai Misje
20	FW	(Norway) NOR	Trond Fredrik Ludvigsen (until June 2007)
21	DF	(Iceland) ISL	Kristján Örn Sigurðsson
22	FW	(Norway) NOR	Thorstein Helstad
26	DF	(Norway) NOR	Knut Walde
28	DF	(Iceland) ISL	Ármann Björnsson
77	FW	(Scotland) SCO	Robbie Winters

=== Out on loan ===
Note: Flags indicate national team as defined under FIFA eligibility rules; some limited exceptions apply. Players may hold more than one non-FIFA nationality.

No.	Pos.	Nation	Player
—	MF	(Norway) NOR	Tore Kannelønning (on loan to Løv-Ham)
—	FW	(Norway) NOR	Thor Jørgen Spurkeland (on loan to Fyllingen)
—	MF	(Norway) NOR	Erlend Storesund (on loan to Løv-Ham)
—	MF	(Norway) NOR	Trond Fredrik Ludvigsen (on loan to Strømsgodset)

No.	Pos.	Nation	Player
—	FW	(Norway) NOR	Arve Walde (on loan to Løv-Ham)
—	MF	(Cameroon) CMR	Arnaud Monkam (loan to Løv-Ham)
—	GK	(Norway) NOR	Kenneth Udjus (loan to Løv-Ham)
—	DF	(Norway) NOR	Yaw Ihle Amankwah (on loan to Fana)

== Transfers ==
=== Players in ===
Only first team squad transfers

Winter 2006/07

- Tijan Jaiteh from Gambia Ports Authority.
- Ramiro Corrales from Ham-Kam
- Kenneth Udjus from Arendal
- Jan Gunnar Solli from Rosenborg

Summer 2006/07

- Knut Walde from Løv-Ham
- Joakim Sjöhage from Elfsborg
- Hassan El Fakiri on a free transfer.
- Azar Karadas from Benfica

=== Players out ===
Only first team squad transfers

Winter 2006/07

- Martin Knudsen to Tromsø IL
- Kristian Ystaas to Notodden F.K.
- Charlie Miller to Lierse (released)
- Steffen Haraldsen to Fyllingen
- Migen Memelli to GAIS
- Kenneth Udjus to Løv-Ham (loan)
- Arnaud Monkam to Løv-Ham (loan)

Summer 2006/07

- Trond Fredrik Ludvigsen to Strømsgodset (loan)
- Helge Haugen to Tromsø IL
- Bengt Sæternes to OB
- Ardian Gashi to Fredrikstad

== Competitions ==
=== Royal League ===
25 February 2007 Group stage	Odense (Sweden)	3–2	(Norway) Brann	Odense, Denmark
15:00	Radonjić 19'; Borre 25', 73'	Report	Helstad 30'; Andresen 65'	Stadium: Fionia Park; Attendance: 3,004; Referee: Peter Fröjdfeldt (Sweden)

1 March 2007 Quarter Final	Brøndby (Denmark)	3–0	(Norway) Brann	Brøndby, Denmark
19:00	Ericsson 27' (pen.); Rasmussen 67'; Katongo 69'	Report		Stadium: Brøndby Stadion; Attendance: 5,471; Referee: Martin Hansson (Sweden)

=== Tippeligaen ===
==== Results summary ====
Overall								Home						Away					
Pld	W	D	L	GF	GA	GD	Pts	W	D	L	GF	GA	GD	W	D	L	GF	GA	GD
26	17	3	6	59	39	+20	54	11	2	0	37	14	+23	6	1	6	22	25	−3

==== Results by round ====
Round	1	2	3	4	5	6	7	8	9	10	11	12	13	14	15	16	17	18	19	20	21	22	23	24	25	26
Ground	A	H	H	A	H	A	H	A	H	A	H	A	H	H	A	A	H	A	H	A	H	A	H	A	H	A
Result	W	W	W	L	D	W	D	W	W	L	W	L	W	W	W	L	W	D	W	W	W	W	W	L	W	L
Position	5	2	1	2	2	2	2	2	1	1	1	2	2	1	1	1	1	1	1	1	1	1	1	1	1	1

Updated to match(es) played on 3 November 2007. Source: see below
A = Away; H = Home; W = Win; D = Draw; L = Loss

==== Results ====
10 April 2007 1	Stabæk	0–1	Brann	Bærum
19:00		Report	Helstad 16'	Stadium: Nadderud Stadion; Attendance: 6,262; Referee: Svein Oddvar Moen

16 April 2007 2	Brann	3–1	Strømsgodset	Bergen
19:00	Helstad 7', 55'; Winters 76'	Report	George 5'	Stadium: Brann Stadion; Attendance: 16,161; Referee: Tom Henning Øvrebø

22 April 2007 3	Brann	4–1	Vålerenga	Bergen
20:00	Sæternes 2', 10', 29', 66'	Report	Storbæk 84'	Stadium: Brann Stadion; Attendance: 16,579; Referee: Kjell Alseth

29 April 2007 4	Rosenborg	3–0	Brann	Trondheim
20:00	Sapara 36', 42'; Koppinen 90+3'	Report		Stadium: Lerkendal Stadion; Attendance: 21,850; Referee: Tom Henning Øvrebø

5 May 2007 5	Brann	2–2	Start	Bergen
19:00	Andresen 3'; Moen 50'	Report	Børufsen 24', 39'	Stadium: Brann Stadion; Attendance: 17,106; Referee: Espen Berntsen

12 May 2007 6	Sandefjord	2–3	Brann	Sandefjord
19:00	Munoz 4'; Sigurdsson 6' (o.g.)	Report	Helstad 45'; Winters 89'; Sigurdsson 90'	Stadium: Storstadion; Attendance: 6,872; Referee: Tommy Skjerven

16 May 2007 7	Brann	2–2	Fredrikstad	Bergen
18:00	Corrales 43'; Helstad 74'	Report	Piiroja 42', 61'	Stadium: Brann Stadion; Attendance: 17,886; Referee: Brage Sandmoen

28 May 2007 8	Odd Grenland	0–2	Brann	Skien
18:00		Report	Sigurdsson 58'; Winters 74'	Stadium: Skagerak Arena; Attendance: 5,430; Referee: Tom Harald Hagen

10 June 2007 9	Brann	3–1	Lillestrøm	Bergen
20:00	Andresen 54' (pen.); Helstad 58', 68'	Report	Occéan 88'	Stadium: Brann Stadion; Attendance: 17,455; Referee: Svein Oddvar Moen

16 June 2007 10	Lyn	6–0	Brann	Oslo
19:00	Powell 2'; Obasi 22'; Gíslason 27' (pen.), 45+1', 85' (pen.); Knudtzon 57'	Report		Stadium: Ullevaal Stadion; Attendance: 12,072; Referee: Espen Berntsen

20 June 2007 11	Brann	2–1	Aalesund	Bergen
19:00	Moen 46'; Sæternes 47'	Report	Fjørtoft 89'	Stadium: Brann Stadion; Attendance: 17,112; Referee: Tom Henning Øvrebø

24 June 2007 12	Viking	3–1	Brann	Stavanger
20:00	Ijeh 43'; Gaarde 57'; Berg 85'	Report	Andresen 79' (pen.)	Stadium: Viking Stadion; Attendance: 16,600; Referee: Tom Henning Øvrebø

1 July 2007 13	Brann	2–1	Tromsø	Bergen
20:00	Moen 32'; Andresen 69' (pen.)	Report	Håkonsen 30'	Stadium: Brann Stadion; Attendance: 16,625; Referee: Brage Sandmoen

22 July 2007 14	Brann	3–0	Stabæk	Bergen
18:00	Helstad 8', 83', 87'	Report		Stadium: Brann Stadion; Attendance: 17,182; Referee: Per Ivar Staberg

29 July 2007 15	Strømsgodset	2–4	Brann	Drammen
18:00	Finstad 85', 86'	Report	Sigurdsson 2'; Helstad 53', 70', 79'	Stadium: Marienlyst Stadion; Attendance: 8,198; Referee: Espen Berntsen

5 August 2007 16	Vålerenga	2–0	Brann	Oslo
20:00	Berre 61', 64'	Report		Stadium: Ullevaal Stadion; Attendance: 17,806; Referee: Svein Oddvar Moen

11 August 2007 17	Brann	3–2	Rosenborg	Bergen
19:00	Winters 18', 45'; Bakke 69'	Report	Traoré 73'; Riseth 86'	Stadium: Brann Stadion; Attendance: 17,580; Referee: Roy Helge Olsen

26 August 2007 18	Start	1–1	Brann	Kristiansand
20:00	Hæstad 27'	Report	Björnsson 86'	Stadium: Sør Arena; Attendance: 11,073; Referee: Tom Henning Øvrebø

2 September 2007 19	Brann	1–0	Sandefjord	Bergen
18:00	Sigurdsson 29'	Report		Stadium: Brann Stadion; Attendance: 17,250; Referee: Svein Erik Edvartsen

16 September 2007 20	Fredrikstad	0–4	Brann	Fredrikstad
20:00		Report	El Fakiri 48'; Karadas 61'; Helstad 66', 80'	Stadium: Fredrikstad Stadion; Attendance: 12,277; Referee: Tom Henning Øvrebø

23 September 2007 21	Brann	4–0	Odd Grenland	Bergen
18:00	Andresen 48' (pen.); Huseklepp 68'; Moen 70'; Helstad 77'	Report		Stadium: Brann Stadion; Attendance: 17,398; Referee: Svein Oddvar Moen

30 September 2007 22	Lillestrøm	1–5	Brann	Lillestrøm
20:00	Myklebust 47'	Report	Moen 14'; Björnsson 17'; Andresen 45+2' (pen.); Helstad 77'; Solli 85'	Stadium: Åråsen Stadion; Attendance: 11,426; Referee: Espen Berntsen

8 October 2007 23	Brann	3–1	Lyn	Bergen
19:00	Helstad 15'; Karadas 90+1', 90+4'	Report	Brink 86'	Stadium: Brann Stadion; Attendance: 17,765; Referee: Per Ivar Staberg

20 October 2007 24	Aalesund	2–1	Brann	Ålesund
19:00	Skiri 4'; Aarøy 25'	Report	Solli 34'	Stadium: Color Line Stadion; Attendance: 10,780; Referee: Brage Sandmoen

28 October 2007 25	Brann	5–2	Viking	Bergen
18:00	Karadas 7'; Helstad 29', 42', 49', 89' (pen.)	Report	Berg 78'; Nisja 79'	Stadium: Brann Stadion; Attendance: 17,824; Referee: Tom Henning Øvrebø

3 November 2007 26	Tromsø	3–0	Brann	Tromsø
18:00	Moldskred 32', 53', 56'	Report		Stadium: Alfheim Stadion; Attendance: 7,450; Referee: Kjell Alseth

==== Table ====
Pos	Team	Pld	W	D	L	GF	GA	GD	Pts	Qualification or relegation
1	Brann (C)	26	17	3	6	59	39	+20	54	Qualification for the Champions League second qualifying round
2	Stabæk	26	14	6	6	53	35	+18	48	Qualification for the UEFA Cup second qualifying round
3	Viking	26	14	5	7	50	40	+10	47	Qualification for the UEFA Cup first qualifying round
4	Lillestrøm	26	12	8	6	47	28	+19	44	Qualification for the UEFA Cup second qualifying round (Note: Lillestrøm qualified for the UEFA Cup second qualifying round by winning the Norwegian Cup. Their spot in the Intertoto Cup was passed down to Rosenborg, the first team in the table not already qualified for any European competition.)
5	Rosenborg	26	12	5	9	53	39	+14	41	Qualification for the Intertoto Cup second round

Source: fotball.no
Rules for classification: 1) points; 2) goal difference; 3) number of goals scored.
(C) Champions

=== Norwegian Cup ===
20 May 2007 Round 1	Trio	0–5	Brann	Husnes
18:00		Report	Solli 33', 90'; Sæternes 39', 83'; Haugen 84'	Stadium: Husnes Stadion; Attendance: 2,810; Referee: Chriss Bjorøy

13 June 2007 Round 2	Øygard	0–5	Brann	Straume
18:00		Report	Ludvigsen 29'; Björnsson 63', 66', 88'; Huseklepp 71'	Stadium: Straume Idrettspark; Attendance: 3,000; Referee: Petter Toppe

27 June 2007 Round 3	Kopervik	0–5	Brann	Kopervik
18:00		Report	Guntveit 49'; Winters 82', 84', 90+1'; Helstad 88'	Stadium: Åsebøen Stadion; Attendance: 1,893; Referee: Kristoffer Helgerud

25 July 2007 Round 4	Viking	2–0	Brann	Stavanger
20:00	Gaarde 13'; Berg 84'	Report		Stadium: Viking Stadion; Attendance: 13,184; Referee: Tommy Skjerven

=== UEFA Cup ===
==== Qualifying rounds ====
19 July 2007 First qualifying round 1st leg	Carmarthen Town (Wales)	0–8	(Norway) Brann	Carmarthen, Wales
20:00		Report	Winters 8', 30', 45'; Helstad 17', 28'; Sigurðsson 70'; Solli 83'; A. Björnsson 90+1'	Stadium: Richmond Park; Attendance: 769; Referee: Vitaliy Hodulian (Ukraine)

2 August 2007 First qualifying round 2nd leg	Brann (Norway)	6–3 (14–3 agg.)	(Wales) Carmarthen Town	Bergen, Norway
19:00	Moen 9'; A. Björnsson 19'; Winters 27', 32'; Sigurðsson 56'; Hanstveit 57'	Report	Thomas 36'; Hicks 47', 90'	Stadium: Brann Stadion; Attendance: 4,597; Referee: Robert Schörgenhofer (Austria)

16 August 2007 Second qualifying round 1st leg	Brann (Norway)	2–1	(Lithuania) Sūduva	Bergen, Norway
19:00 CET	Björnsson 24'; Winters 49'	Report	Negreiros 56' (pen.)	Stadium: Brann Stadion; Attendance: 7,400; Referee: Luc Wilmes (Luxembourg)

30 August 2007 Second qualifying round 2nd leg	Sūduva (Lithuania)	3–4 (4–6 agg.)	(Norway) Brann	Marijampolė, Lithuania
16:00	Urbsys 46'; Maciulevičius 78'; Otavio 84'	Report	Moen 37'; Björnsson 45'; Solli 57'; Huseklepp 63'	Stadium: Sūduva Stadium; Attendance: 1,300; Referee: Veaceslav Banari (Moldova)

==== First round ====
20 September 2007 1st leg	Brann (Norway)	0–1	(Belgium) Club Brugge	Bergen, Norway
19:00		Report	Sterchele 84'	Stadium: Brann Stadion; Attendance: 10,471; Referee: Jaroslav Jára (Czech Republic)

4 October 2007 2nd leg	Club Brugge (Belgium)	1–2 (2–2(a) agg.)	(Norway) Brann	Bruges, Belgium
16:00	Clement 76'	Report	Helstad 14'; Winters 39'	Stadium: Jan Breydel Stadium; Attendance: 14,570; Referee: Selçuk Dereli (Turkey)

==== Group stage ====
Pos	Team	Pld	W	D	L	GF	GA	GD	Pts	Qualification
1	(Germany) Hamburger SV	4	3	1	0	7	1	+6	10	Advance to knockout stage
2	(Switzerland) Basel	4	2	2	0	3	1	+2	8	Advance to knockout stage
3	(Norway) Brann	4	1	1	2	3	4	−1	4	Advance to knockout stage
4	(Croatia) Dinamo Zagreb	4	0	2	2	2	5	−3	2	
5	(France) Rennes	4	0	2	2	2	6	−4	2	

25 October 2007 1	Brann (Norway)	0–1	(Germany) Hamburg	Bergen, Norway
19:00		Report	Kompany 62'	Stadium: Brann Stadion; Attendance: 13,029; Referee: Georgios Kasnaferis (Greece)

8 November 2007 2	Rennes (France)	1–1	(Norway) Brann	Rennes, France
19:00	Cheyrou 88' (pen.)	Report	Karadas 24'	Stadium: Stade de la Route de Lorient; Attendance: 11,291; Referee: Gerald Lehner (Austria)

29 November 2007 3	Brann (Norway)	2–1	(Croatia) Dinamo Zagreb	Bergen, Norway
20:15	Bjarnason 45' (pen.); Bakke 72'	Report	Vukojević 49'	Stadium: Brann Stadion; Attendance: 9,962; Referee: Cristian Balaj (Romania)

5 December 2007 4	Basel (Switzerland)	1–0	(Norway) Brann	Basel, Switzerland
20:45	Carlitos 40'	Report		Stadium: St. Jakob-Park; Attendance: 13,731; Referee: Igor Egorov (Russia)

Round of 16 took place during the 2008 season.

== Matches (goals) ==
The table shows matches and goals in the Tippeligaen, Norwegian Cup, Royal League and European Cup/UEFA Cup, and was last updated after the game against FC Basel on 5 December 2007.

No.	Position	Player	Premiership	Norwegian Cup	Europe	Royal League	Total
1	GK	Johan Thorbjørnsen	3 (0)	3 (0)	3 (0)	1 (0)	10 (0)
12	GK	Håkon Opdal	25 (0)	1 (0)	7 (0)	2 (0)	35 (0)
24	GK	Kenneth Udjus	0 (0)	0 (0)	0 (0)	0 (0)	0 (0)
3	DF	Bjørn Dahl	15 (0)	4 (0)	9 (0)	2 (0)	30 (0)
5	DF	Ramiro Corrales	11 (1)	3 (0)	3 (0)	0 (0)	17 (1)
15	DF	Erlend Hanstveit	19 (0)	4 (0)	9 (1)	2 (0)	34 (1)
18	DF	Ólafur Örn Bjarnason	25 (0)	3 (0)	10 (1)	2 (0)	40 (1)
21	DF	Kristján Örn Sigurðsson	24 (4)	3 (0)	7 (2)	0 (0)	34 (6)
26	DF	Knut Walde	3 (0)	0 (0)	1 (0)	0 (0)	4 (0)
6	DF/FW	Azar Karadas	8 (4)	0 (0)	6 (1)	0 (0)	14 (5)
28	DF/FW	Ármann Smári Björnsson	15 (2)	6 (5)	5 (2)	2 (0)	28 (9)
4	DF/MF	Cato Guntveit	16 (0)	2 (1)	7 (1)	2 (0)	27 (2)
6	MF	Helge Haugen	4 (0)	3 (0)	0 (0)	1 (0)	8 (0)
7	MF	Hassan El Fakiri	9 (1)	0 (0)	5 (0)	0 (0)	14 (1)
7	MF	Ardian Gashi	11 (0)	3 (0)	2 (0)	2 (0)	18 (0)
8	MF	Martin Andresen	23 (6)	1 (0)	4 (0)	2 (1)	30 (7)
9	MF	Jan Gunnar Solli	25 (2)	3 (2)	9 (2)	0 (0)	37 (6)
11	MF	Petter Vaagan Moen	25 (5)	2 (0)	8 (2)	2 (0)	37 (7)
13	MF	Erik Huseklepp	22 (1)	4 (0)	10 (1)	2 (0)	38 (2)
14	MF	Tijan Jaiteh	11 (0)	1 (0)	4 (0)	0 (0)	16 (0)
17	MF	Eirik Bakke	10 (1)	3 (0)	7 (1)	0 (0)	20 (2)
19	MF	Nicolai Misje	0 (0)	0 (0)	0 (0)	0 (0)	0 (0)
30	MF	Arnaud Monkam	0 (0)	0 (0)	0 (0)	1 (0)	1 (0)
20	MF/FW	Trond Fredrik Ludvigsen	1 (0)	2 (1)	0 (0)	1 (0)	4 (1)
9	FW	Migen Memelli	0 (0)	0 (0)	0 (0)	1 (0)	1 (0)
10	FW	Bengt Sæternes	10 (5)	1 (2)	0 (0)	1 (0)	12 (7)
16	FW	Joakim Sjöhage	3 (0)	0 (0)	3 (0)	0 (0)	6 (0)
22	FW	Thorstein Helstad	24 (22)	2 (1)	7 (3)	2 (1)	35 (27)
77	FW	Robbie Winters	19 (5)	4 (3)	5 (7)	0 (0)	28 (15)
