= 2006 SK Brann season =

Brann
2006 season
- Manager: Mons Ivar Mjelde
- Stadium: Brann Stadion
- Tippeligaen: 2nd
- Norwegian Cup: 4th round
- UEFA Cup: Second qualifying round
- Top goalscorer: League: Bengt Sæternes (10); All: Bengt Sæternes (11)
- Highest home attendance: 19,348 (vs Rosenborg, 22 October 2006)
- Lowest home attendance: 13,528 (vs Lillestrøm, 18 April 2006)

The 2006 season was SK Brann's 98th season and their 20th consecutive season in the Tippeligaen. The season opened on 10 April, with a tie in Fredrikstad, in a match best remembered by an impressive scissor kick goal from Charlie Miller. 8 month later, on 10 December, Brann finished the season with a tie against Helsingborgs IF in their last group stage match in the 2006-07 Royal League.

== Information ==
Manager: Mons Ivar Mjelde
League: Tippeligaen
Shirt supplier: Umbro (Kappa from 1 December)
Shirt sponsor: Sparebanken Vest
Highest league attendance: 19,348 (v Rosenborg, October 22)
Lowest league attendance: 13,528 (v Lillestrøm, April 18)
Average league attendance: 16,707
League: Silver
Norwegian Cup: 4th round
Europe: UEFA Cup, second qualifying round
Royal League: Quarter finals
Top goalscorer league: Bengt Sæternes, 10 goals
Top goalscorer season: Bengt Sæternes, 11 goals
Player of the year: Håkon Opdal

== Season events ==
- 10 April: Opening day of the season. Brann plays a 1-1 draw against Fredrikstad FK in Fredrikstad, best remembered by a scissor kick goal from Charlie Miller.
- 30 April: Brann beats the reigning champions, Vålerenga 3-1 in Bergen.
- 5 June: Rosenborg-Brann 0-0 in front of 19,215 spectators.
- 8 June: After knocking FBK Voss out of the Norwegian Cup, SK Brann enters the summer break as undefeated league leaders. Their win–loss record in the league is 7-4-0 with 19 goals for and 7 goals against.
- 2 July: Brann resumes the season in the worst possible way. They lose 0-4 in Hamar against the relegation-fighting Ham-Kam.
- 20 July: Brann is eliminated from the Norwegian Cup after a 1-3 loss in Kristiansand against IK Start.
- 27 July: Brann advances to the 2nd UEFA Cup qualifying round, after winning 1-0 against Glentoran FC in both legs.
- 2 August: Brann loses 0-2 against their biggest rival in the race for Premiership-gold, Lillestrøm SK.
- 24 August: Brann gets knocked-out of the UEFA Cup after a defeat on aggregate against the amateurs from the Swedish Åtvidabergs FF.
- 17 September: Brann keeps the gold-dream alive with a 5-3 victory against Sandefjord Fotball.
- 15 October: Brann loses to FC Lyn Oslo. Their two previous matches gave them one victory and one defeat. The gold race seems to come down to the match between Rosenborg and Brann in Bergen. Brann have to win for gold, while Rosenborg is almost guaranteed the gold medal with a victory over Brann.
- 22 October: The Brann-Rosenborg showdown saw Rosenborg win 3-1, taking them six points clear of Brann with two rounds left. With an advantage of +13 over Brann in goal difference, Rosenborg are virtually assured of the title (99%), and can remove any doubt by picking up one point in either of their remaining matches.
- 29 October: Brann beats Ham-Kam 2-0 and secures the silver medals. Rosenborg beats Viking FK, and take home the Tippeligaen trophy for the 20th time.
- 2 November: Sport Director Per Ove Ludvigsen resigned after four year as chief in Brann.
- 5 November: Brann is defeated in Stavanger, when Viking F.K. won 5-0. Brann's Premiership statistics were. Win/loss: 14-4-7, goals scored: 39 goals against: 36, points: 46.
- 6 November: Brann prepares for the Royal League-group stage. Brann is in group 1 with the Norwegian champions Rosenborg, the bronzemedalist from Denmark, Odense Boldklub and the number 4 in the Swedish league, Helsingborgs IF.
- 9 November: Brann wins 3-1 at the Royal League 2006-07 opening game against Rosenborg.
- 24 November: Roald Bruun-Hanssen is hired as new sports director.
- 26 November: Brann-Helsingborg 2-2, in the 2nd round of the Royal League. Cato Guntveit played his first match since 24 August, after being troubled with injuries most of the season.
- 7 December: Brann qualified for the quarterfinals in the Royal League, after defeating Rosenborg 3-2 at home.
- 10 December: Brann tied with Helsingborg in the last group stage match in the 2006-07 Royal League. The match was also Henrik "Henke" Larsson's last match before his loan-transfer to Manchester United. Both Brann and Helsingborg qualified for the quarterfinal in the Royal League, while Odense finished 3rd and qualified to the quarterfinal as one of the two best 3rd placed teams in the group stage. Rosenborg was eliminated from the tournament.

== Squad ==

Brann's most used line-up in 2006 (4-4-2).

Note: Flags indicate national team as defined under FIFA eligibility rules; some limited exceptions apply. Players may hold more than one non-FIFA nationality.

No.	Pos.	Nation	Player
1	GK	NOR	Johan Thorbjørnsen
2	DF	SVN	Janez Zavrl (until October 2006)
3	DF	NOR	Bjørn Dahl
4	DF	NOR	Cato Guntveit (injured whole season)
5	MF	NOR	Martin Knudsen
6	MF	NOR	Helge Haugen
7	FW	SCO	Robbie Winters
8	MF	NOR	Martin Andresen (C)
9	FW	NOR	Thorstein Helstad (from June 2006)
10	FW	NOR	Bengt Sæternes
11	MF	NOR	Petter Vaagan Moen
12	GK	NOR	Håkon Opdal
13	MF	NOR	Erik Huseklepp
14	MF	NOR	Ardian Gashi (from September 2006)

No.	Pos.	Nation	Player
14	MF	HON	Maynor Suazo (until July 2006)
15	DF	NOR	Erlend Hanstveit
16	MF	SCO	Charlie Miller
17	DF	NOR	Christian Kalvenes (until August 2006)
17	MF	NOR	Eirik Bakke (from September 2006)
18	DF	ISL	Ólafur Örn Bjarnason
19	MF	NOR	Nicolai Misje
20	MF	NOR	Trond Fredrik Ludvigsen (injured most of the season)
21	DF	ISL	Kristján Örn Sigurðsson
22	FW	NOR	Kristian Ystaas
24	GK	NOR	Steffen Haraldsen
25	FW	ALB	Migen Memelli
28	DF	ISL	Ármann Björnsson (from August 2006)
30	MF	CMR	Arnaud Monkam

== Competitions ==
=== Tippeligaen ===
==== Results summary ====
Overall								Home						Away					
Pld	W	D	L	GF	GA	GD	Pts	W	D	L	GF	GA	GD	W	D	L	GF	GA	GD
26	14	4	8	39	36	+3	46	9	2	2	26	15	+11	5	2	6	13	21	−8

==== Results by round ====
Round	1	2	3	4	5	6	7	8	9	10	11	12	13	14	15	16	17	18	19	20	21	22	23	24	25	26
Ground	A	H	A	H	A	H	A	H	A	H	A	A	H	A	H	H	A	H	A	H	A	H	A	H	H	A
Result	D	D	W	W	W	D	W	W	W	W	D	L	W	L	W	L	L	W	W	W	L	W	L	L	W	L
Position	4	7	5	3	1	2	2	2	1	1	1	1	1	1	1	1	1	1	1	1	2	2	2	2	2	2

Updated to match(es) played on 5 November 2006. Source: see below
A = Away; H = Home; W = Win; D = Draw; L = Loss

==== Results ====
10 April 2006 1	Fredrikstad	1–1	Brann	Fredrikstad
19:00	Bjørkøy 22'	Report	Miller 31'	Stadium: Fredrikstad Stadion; Attendance: 9,017; Referee: Tom Henning Øvrebø

18 April 2006 2	Brann	1–1	Lillestrøm	Bergen
19:00	Winters 55'	Report	Occean 59'	Stadium: Brann Stadion; Attendance: 13,738; Referee: Espen Berntsen

24 April 2006 3	Start	0–1	Brann	Kristiansand
19:00		Report	Winters 60'	Stadium: Kristiansand Stadion; Attendance: 7,782; Referee: Brage Sandmoen

30 April 2006 4	Brann	3–1	Vålerenga	Bergen
20:00	Haugen 16'; Sæternes 76'; Winters 84'	Report	Jepsen 82'	Stadium: Brann Stadion; Attendance: 16,170; Referee: Olsen

3 May 2006 5	Molde	0–2	Brann	Molde
18:00		Report	Miller 31'; Moen 90+2'	Stadium: Molde Stadion; Attendance: 7,875; Referee: Per Ivar Staberg

7 May 2006 6	Brann	2–2	Stabæk	Bergen
18:00	Memelli 80'; Sigurðsson 88'	Report	Gunnarsson 29'; Nannskog 36'	Stadium: Brann Stadion; Attendance: 14,430; Referee: Kjell Alseth

13 May 2006 7	Sandefjord	0–2	Brann	Sandefjord
16:00		Report	Sigurðsson 3'; Miller 73'	Stadium: Storstadion; Attendance: 6,152; Referee: Tom Henning Øvrebø

16 May 2006 8	Brann	2–1	Tromsø	Bergen
18:05	Moen 32'; Bjarnason 52'	Report	Årst 4'	Stadium: Brann Stadion; Attendance: 18,568; Referee: Brage Sandmoen

21 May 2006 9	Odd Grenland	1–3	Brann	Skien
18:00	Joyce 17'	Report	Winters 8'; Miller 14'; Sæternes 50'	Stadium: Odd Stadion; Attendance: 6,183; Referee: Svein-Erik Edvartsen

28 May 2006 10	Brann	2–0	Lyn	Bergen
20:00	Sæternes 43'; Sæternes 56'	Report		Stadium: Brann Stadion; Attendance: 15,331; Referee: Espen Berntsen

5 June 2006 11	Rosenborg	0–0	Brann	Trondheim
20:00		Report		Stadium: Lerkendal Stadion; Attendance: 19,215; Referee: Tom Henning Øvrebø

2 July 2006 12	HamKam	4–0	Brann	Hamar
18:00	Abiodun 2'; Ringberg 34'; Øren 57'; Kienast 85'	Report		Stadium: Briskeby Gressbane; Attendance: 6,218; Referee: Per Ivar Staberg

17 July 2006 13	Brann	2–0	Viking	Bergen
18:00	Sigurðsson 16'; Sæternes 23'	Report		Stadium: Brann Stadion; Attendance: 16,555; Referee: Roy Helge Olsen

30 July 2006 15	Brann	3–1	Fredrikstad	Bergen
18:00	Andresen 29'; Sæternes 33'; Szekeres 90' (o.g.)	Report	Elyounoussi 5'	Stadium: Brann Stadion; Attendance: 16,282; Referee: Kjell Alseth

2 August 2006 14	Lillestrøm	2–0	Brann	Lillestrøm
19:00	Mifsud 83', 84'	Report		Stadium: Åråsen Stadion; Attendance: 11,582; Referee: Tom Henning Øvrebø

6 August 2006 16	Brann	0–1	Start	Bergen
18:00		Report	Zavrl 18' (o.g.)	Stadium: Brann Stadion; Attendance: 16,426; Referee: Tommy Skjerven

13 August 2006 17	Vålerenga	2–1	Brann	Oslo
18:00	Sørensen 26'; Berre 51'	Report	Wæhler 76' (o.g.)	Stadium: Ullevaal Stadion; Attendance: 16,484; Referee: Skjerven

27 August 2006 18	Brann	2–1	Molde	Bergen
18:00	Winters 56'; Sæternes 82'	Report	Hestad 35'	Stadium: Brann Stadion; Attendance: 17,360; Referee: Svein Oddvar Moen

11 September 2006 19	Stabæk	1–2	Brann	Bærum
19:00	Nannskog 81'	Report	Winters 38'; 87' Miller	Stadium: Nadderud Stadion; Attendance: 6,117; Referee: Roy Helge Olsen

17 September 2006 20	Brann	5–3	Sandefjord	Bergen
20:00	Sæternes 38', 56'; Miller 46'; Bjarnason 88'; Andresen 90+2' (pen.)	Report	Knarvik 68' (pen.); Mjelde 77'; Madsen 83'	Stadium: Brann Stadion; Attendance: 16,900; Referee: Kristoffer Helgerud

24 September 2006 21	Tromsø	3–1	Brann	Tromsø
20:00	Rushfeldt 11'; Bernier 79'	Report	Moen 47'	Stadium: Alfheim Stadion; Attendance: 4,264; Referee: Brage Sandmoen

2 October 2006 22	Brann	1–0	Odd Grenland	Bergen
19:00	Winters 65'	Report		Stadium: Brann Stadion; Attendance: 17,767; Referee: Tom Henning Øvrebø

15 October 2006 23	Lyn	2–0	Brann	Oslo
20:00	Hoff 41'; Sokolowski 73'	Report		Stadium: Ullevaal Stadion; Attendance: 10,643; Referee: Svein-Erik Edvartsen

22 October 2006 24	Brann	1–3	Rosenborg	Bergen
20:00	Andresen 49' (pen.)	Report	Storflor 36'; Iversen 67'; Sapara 86'	Stadium: Brann Stadion; Attendance: 19,254; Referee: Tommy Skjerven

29 October 2006 25	Brann	2–1	HamKam	Bergen
20:00	Helstad 45+1', 58'	Report	Abiodun 43'	Stadium: Brann Stadion; Attendance: 17,930; Referee: Brage Sandmoen

5 November 2006 26	Viking	5–0	Brann	Stavanger
18:00	Ijeh 31', 44', 55', 82'; Sigurðsson 48' (o.g.)	Report		Stadium: Viking Stadion; Attendance: 16,251; Referee: Tom Henning Øvrebø

==== Table ====
Pos	Team	Pld	W	D	L	GF	GA	GD	Pts	Qualification or relegation
1	Rosenborg (C)	26	15	8	3	47	24	+23	53	Qualification for the Champions League second qualifying round
2	Brann	26	14	4	8	39	36	+3	46	Qualification for the UEFA Cup first qualifying round (Note: Lillestrøm qualified for the UEFA Cup first qualifying round through the UEFA Fair Play ranking award.)
3	Vålerenga	26	13	5	8	43	28	+15	44	Qualification for the UEFA Cup first qualifying round
4	Lillestrøm	26	12	8	6	44	33	+11	44	Qualification for the UEFA Cup first qualifying round
5	Stabæk	26	10	9	7	53	36	+17	39	

Source: fotball.no
Rules for classification: 1) points; 2) goal difference; 3) number of goals scored.
(C) Champions

=== Norwegian Cup ===
10 May 2006 Round 1	Follese	0–1	Brann	Bergen
16:00		Report	Huseklepp 76'	Stadium: Follese Gress; Attendance: 1,526; Referee: Håvard Hakestad

8 June 2006 Round 2	Voss	0–4	Brann	Vossavangen
18:00		Report	Memelli 26', 29'; Winters 58' (pen.); Ystaas 88'	Stadium: Prestegardsmoen Kunstgras; Attendance: 2,350; Referee: Håvard Hakestad

5 July 2006 Round 3	Brann	3–1	Levanger	Bergen
18:00	Bjarnason 5' (pen.); Sæternes 53'; Memelli 88'	Report	Bjøraas 63'	Stadium: Brann Stadion; Attendance: 1,948; Referee: Rune Nordby

20 July 2006 Round 4	Start	3–1	Brann	Kristiansand
19:00	Hæstad 5'; Nielsen 45'; Bärlin 70'	Report	Sigurðsson 68'	Stadium: Kristiansand Stadion; Attendance: 4,486; Referee: Svein Oddvar Moen

=== UEFA Cup ===
==== Qualifying rounds ====
13 July 2006 First qualifying round 1st leg	Glentoran (Northern Ireland)	0–1	(Norway) Brann	Belfast, Northern Ireland
20:30		Report	Memelli 69'	Stadium: The Oval; Attendance: 1,743; Referee: Anders Hermansen (Denmark)

27 July 2006 First qualifying round 2nd leg	Brann (Norway)	1–0 (2–0 agg.)	(Northern Ireland) Glentoran	Bergen, Norway
19:30	Bjarnason 85' (pen.)	Report		Stadium: Brann Stadion; Attendance: 3,584; Referee: Jérôme Laperrière (Switzerland)

10 August 2006 Second qualifying round 1st leg	Brann (Norway)	3–3	(Sweden) Åtvidaberg	Bergen, Norway
19:00	Memelli 4', 26', 59'	Report	Haglund 27'; Bergström 28'; Karlsson 83'	Stadium: Brann Stadion; Attendance: 2,684; Referee: Richard Havrilla (Slovakia)

24 August 2006 Second qualifying round 2nd leg	Åtvidaberg (Sweden)	1–1 (4(a)–4 agg.)	(Norway) Brann	Växjö, Sweden
19:30	Haglund 35'	Report	Dahl 85'	Stadium: Värendsvallen; Attendance: 786; Referee: Marek Mikołajewski (Poland)

=== Royal League ===
==== Group stage ====
Pos	Team	Pld	W	D	L	GF	GA	GD	Pts	Qualification
1	(Denmark) Odense BK	6	4	1	1	13	7	+6	13	Advanced to knockout stage
2	(Norway) SK Brann	6	2	3	1	13	11	+2	9	Advanced to knockout stage
3	(Sweden) Helsingborgs IF	6	2	3	1	8	8	0	9	Advanced to knockout stage
4	(Norway) Rosenborg BK	6	0	1	5	7	15	−8	1	

9 November 2006 1	Rosenborg (Norway)	1–3	(Norway) Brann	Trondheim, Norway
19:30	Storflor 4'	Report	Björnsson 11'; Huseklepp 33'; Ystaas 83'	Stadium: Lerkendal Stadion; Attendance: 5,755; Referee: Martin Hansson (Sweden)

26 November 2006 3	Brann (Norway)	2–2	(Sweden) Helsingborg	Bergen, Norway
15:00	Gashi 73'; Memelli 86'	Report	Shelton 10', 58'	Stadium: Brann Stadion; Attendance: 3,535; Referee: Nicolai Vollquartz (Denmark)

3 December 2006 4	Brann (Norway)	1–1	(Denmark) Odense	Bergen, Norway
13:55	Gashi 36'	Report	Christensen 25'	Stadium: Brann Stadion; Attendance: 2,432; Referee: Martin Hansson (Sweden)

7 December 2006 5	Brann (Norway)	3–2	(Norway) Rosenborg	Bergen, Norway
19:30	Huseklepp 20'; Monkam 68'; Ludvigsen 90'	Report	Tettey 25'; Riseth 89'	Stadium: Brann Stadion; Attendance: 3,152; Referee: Daniel Stålhammar (Sweden)

10 December 2006 6	Helsingborg (Sweden)	2–2	(Norway) Brann	Hässleholm, Sweden
16:00	Shelton 14'; Larsson 72'	Report	Huseklepp 3'; Bjarnason 51' (pen.)	Stadium: Österås IP; Attendance: 2,944; Referee: Martin Hansson (Sweden)

Last their match in the Group stage took place during the 2007 season.

== Matches (goals) ==
Matches and goal are for matches in the Tippeligaen, Norwegian Cup, Royal League and European Cup/UEFA Cup, and was last updated after the seasons last game 10 December.

No.	Position	Player	Premiership	Norwegian Cup	Europe	Royal League	Total
1	GK	Johan Thorbjørnsen	1 (0)	2 (0)	3 (0)	2 (0)	8 (0)
12	GK	Håkon Opdal	25 (0)	2 (0)	1 (0)	3 (0)	31 (0)
24	GK	Steffen Haraldsen	0 (0)	0 (0)	0 (0)	0 (0)	0 (0)
2	DF	Janez Zavrl	7 (0)	0 (0)	3 (0)	0 (0)	10 (0)
3	DF	Bjørn Dahl	23 (0)	3 (0)	3 (1)	5 (0)	34 (1)
15	DF	Erlend Hanstveit	24 (0)	3 (0)	4 (0)	0 (0)	31 (0)
17	DF	Christian Kalvenes	5 (0)	2 (0)	2 (0)	0 (0)	9 (0)
18	DF	Ólafur Örn Bjarnason	25 (2)	4 (1)	4 (1)	5 (1)	38 (5)
21	DF	Kristján Örn Sigurðsson	24 (3)	4 (1)	3 (0)	0 (0)	31 (4)
28	DF	Ármann Smári Björnsson	2 (0)	0 (0)	0 (0)	2 (1)	4 (1)
4	DF/MF	Cato Guntveit	0 (0)	0 (0)	2 (0)	4 (0)	6 (0)
5	DF/MF	Martin Knudsen	21 (0)	3 (0)	4 (0)	5 (0)	33 (0)
6	MF	Helge Haugen	23 (1)	4 (0)	4 (0)	5 (0)	36 (1)
8	MF	Martin Andresen	24 (3)	2 (0)	2 (0)	0 (0)	28 (3)
11	MF	Petter Vaagan Moen	24 (3)	4 (0)	1 (0)	4 (0)	33 (3)
13	MF	Erik Huseklepp	11 (0)	4 (1)	3 (0)	5 (3)	23 (4)
14	MF	Maynor Suazo	1 (0)	1 (0)	1 (0)	0 (0)	2 (0)
14	MF	Ardian Gashi	7 (0)	0 (0)	0 (0)	5 (1)	12 (2)
17	MF	Eirik Bakke	7 (0)	0 (0)	0 (0)	1 (0)	8 (0)
19	MF	Nicolai Misje	0 (0)	0 (0)	2 (0)	0 (0)	2 (0)
30	MF	Arnaud Monkam	1 (0)	3 (0)	2 (0)	5 (1)	11 (1)
16	MF/FW	Charlie Miller	20 (6)	2 (0)	3 (0)	1 (0)	26 (3)
20	MF/FW	Trond Fredrik Ludvigsen	4 (0)	2 (0)	1 (0)	4 (0)	11 (0)
7	FW	Robbie Winters	25 (7)	3 (1)	2 (0)	2 (0)	32 (8)
9	FW	Thorstein Helstad	12 (2)	1 (0)	2 (0)	2 (0)	17 (2)
10	FW	Bengt Sæternes	25 (10)	2 (1)	2 (0)	0 (0)	29 (11)
22	FW	Kristian Ystaas	0 (0)	2 (1)	0 (0)	4 (1)	6 (2)
25	FW	Migen Memelli	19 (1)	3 (3)	3 (4)	4 (1)	29 (9)
