= 2005 SK Brann season =

Brann
2005 season
- Chairman: Magne Revheim
- Manager: Mons Ivar Mjelde
- Tippeligaen: 6th
- Norwegian Cup: Quarter-finals
- UEFA Cup: First round
- Royal League: 2nd group stage
- Top goalscorer: Bengt Sæternes (9)
- Highest home attendance: 17,503 (vs Lillestrøm, 16 May 2005)
- Lowest home attendance: 12,282 (vs Lyn, 29 May 2005)

The 2005 season was SK Brann's 97th season as a club and their 19th consecutive season in the Tippeligaen. The year started with a 2-0 loss to Malmø in Royal League 2004-2005, and the Norwegian league opened with a win 2-0 home at Brann Stadion over Molde, in a match best remembered by Paul Scharners efforts for Brann even though his wife was expecting a baby at any minute. Paul Scharner scored and was appointed Man of the match - his daughter was born the following day. On October 29 Brann finished the season with a draw against Ham-Kam and finished 6th in the Tippeligaen. After the season finished Scharner was named Player of the year. The Norwegian cup ended by being eliminated by Vålerenga at Ullevaal Stadion in the Quarterfinals. After the season ended in October construction work started in The Clock End at Brann stadion, where a new stand was built during the winter.

== Squad ==
Note: Flags indicate national team as defined under FIFA eligibility rules; some limited exceptions apply. Players may hold more than one non-FIFA nationality.

No.	Pos.	Nation	Player
1	GK	NOR	Johan Thorbjørnsen
2	DF	NOR	Jan Tore Ophaug
3	DF	NOR	Ragnvald Soma
4	DF	NOR	Cato Guntveit (C)
5	MF	NOR	Martin Knudsen
6	MF	NOR	Helge Haugen
7	FW	SCO	Robbie Winters
8	MF	NOR	Martin Andresen
9	FW	AUS	Dylan Macallister
10	FW	NOR	Bengt Sæternes
11	FW	NOR	Kristian Ystaas
12	GK	NOR	Håkon Opdal
13	MF	NOR	Erik Huseklepp
13	MF	NOR	Erlend Storesund

No.	Pos.	Nation	Player
14	MF	NOR	Arve Walde
15	DF	NOR	Erlend Hanstveit
16	MF	SCO	Charlie Miller
17	DF	NOR	Christian Kalvenes
18	DF	ISL	Ólafur Örn Bjarnason
19	MF	NOR	Tom Sanne
21	DF	ISL	Kristján Örn Sigurðsson
22	MF	GHA	Michael Helegbe
24	GK	NOR	Steffen Haraldsen
25	MF	AUT	Paul Scharner
27	MF	NOR	Raymond Kvisvik
28	DF	NOR	Fredrik Klock
29	MF	NOR	Nicolai Misje
30	FW	NOR	Thor Jørgen Spurkeland

== Competitions ==
=== Royal League ===
==== First group stage ====
Pos	Team	Pld	W	D	L	GF	GA	GD	Pts	Qualification
1	(Norway) Vålerenga IF	6	5	1	0	10	4	+6	16	Advanced to second group stage
2	(Norway) Rosenborg BK	6	3	1	2	10	9	+1	10	Advanced to second group stage
3	(Denmark) Esbjerg fB	6	2	1	3	6	5	+1	7	
4	(Sweden) Djurgårdens IF	6	0	1	5	5	13	−8	1	

Pos	Team	Pld	W	D	L	GF	GA	GD	Pts	Qualification
1	(Denmark) FC Copenhagen	6	4	2	0	8	1	+7	14	Advanced to second group stage
2	(Sweden) IFK Göteborg	6	3	1	2	6	3	+3	10	Advanced to second group stage
3	(Denmark) Brøndby IF	6	2	1	3	7	9	−2	7	
4	(Norway) Tromsø IL	6	0	2	4	3	11	−8	2	

Pos	Team	Pld	W	D	L	GF	GA	GD	Pts	Qualification
1	(Sweden) Malmö FF	6	4	0	2	9	8	+1	12	Advanced to second group stage
2	(Norway) SK Brann	6	3	1	2	8	6	+2	10	Advanced to second group stage
3	(Sweden) Halmstads BK	6	2	2	2	7	6	+1	8	
4	(Denmark) Odense BK	6	1	1	4	7	11	−4	4	

Pos	Team	Pld	W	D	L	GF	GA	GD	Pts	Qualification
1	(Denmark) FC Copenhagen	4	2	1	1	5	4	+1	7	Advanced to final
2	(Sweden) Malmö FF	4	2	0	2	6	6	0	6	
3	(Norway) Rosenborg BK	4	1	1	2	6	7	−1	4	

Pos	Team	Pld	W	D	L	GF	GA	GD	Pts	Qualification
1	(Sweden) IFK Göteborg	4	3	1	0	7	3	+4	10	Advanced to final
2	(Norway) Vålerenga IF	4	1	2	1	6	6	0	5	
3	(Norway) SK Brann	4	0	1	3	2	6	−4	1	

12 February 2005 4	Malmö FF (Sweden)	2–0	(Norway) Brann	Malmö, Sweden
13:30	Osmanovski 54'; Rosenberg 57'	Report		Stadium: Malmö Stadion; Attendance: 3,869; Referee: Anders Hermansen (Denmark)

17 February 2005 5	Brann (Norway)	2–1	(Denmark) Odense	Bergen, Norway
18:30	Macallister 3', 30'	Report	Sørensen 83'	Stadium: Vestlandshallen; Attendance: 3,500; Referee: Stefan Johannesson (Sweden)

24 February 2005 6	Halmstad (Sweden)	0–0	(Norway) Brann	Gothenburg, Sweden
20:35		Report		Stadium: Nya Ullevi; Attendance: 272; Referee: Claus Bo Larsen (Denmark)

==== Second group stage ====
Pos	Team	Pld	W	D	L	GF	GA	GD	Pts	Qualification
1	(Norway) Vålerenga IF	6	5	1	0	10	4	+6	16	Advanced to second group stage
2	(Norway) Rosenborg BK	6	3	1	2	10	9	+1	10	Advanced to second group stage
3	(Denmark) Esbjerg fB	6	2	1	3	6	5	+1	7	
4	(Sweden) Djurgårdens IF	6	0	1	5	5	13	−8	1	

Pos	Team	Pld	W	D	L	GF	GA	GD	Pts	Qualification
1	(Denmark) FC Copenhagen	6	4	2	0	8	1	+7	14	Advanced to second group stage
2	(Sweden) IFK Göteborg	6	3	1	2	6	3	+3	10	Advanced to second group stage
3	(Denmark) Brøndby IF	6	2	1	3	7	9	−2	7	
4	(Norway) Tromsø IL	6	0	2	4	3	11	−8	2	

Pos	Team	Pld	W	D	L	GF	GA	GD	Pts	Qualification
1	(Sweden) Malmö FF	6	4	0	2	9	8	+1	12	Advanced to second group stage
2	(Norway) SK Brann	6	3	1	2	8	6	+2	10	Advanced to second group stage
3	(Sweden) Halmstads BK	6	2	2	2	7	6	+1	8	
4	(Denmark) Odense BK	6	1	1	4	7	11	−4	4	

Pos	Team	Pld	W	D	L	GF	GA	GD	Pts	Qualification
1	(Denmark) FC Copenhagen	4	2	1	1	5	4	+1	7	Advanced to final
2	(Sweden) Malmö FF	4	2	0	2	6	6	0	6	
3	(Norway) Rosenborg BK	4	1	1	2	6	7	−1	4	

Pos	Team	Pld	W	D	L	GF	GA	GD	Pts	Qualification
1	(Sweden) IFK Göteborg	4	3	1	0	7	3	+4	10	Advanced to final
2	(Norway) Vålerenga IF	4	1	2	1	6	6	0	5	
3	(Norway) SK Brann	4	0	1	3	2	6	−4	1	

10 March 2005 1	IFK Göteborg (Sweden)	2–0	(Norway) Brann	Gothenburg, Sweden
18:30	Alexandersson 38'; Mourad 66'	Report		Stadium: Nya Ullevi; Attendance: 4,072; Referee: Nicolai Vollquartz (Denmark)

17 March 2005 2	Brann (Norway)	2–2	(Norway) Vålerenga	Bergen, Norway
20:35	Knudsen 4'; Miller 30'	Report	Ishizaki 66'; Berre 87'	Stadium: Vestlandshallen; Attendance: 3,200; Referee: Martin Ingvarsson (Sweden)

28 April 2005 3	Vålerenga (Norway)	1–0	(Norway) Brann	Oslo, Norway
20:30	Hulsker 9'	Report		Stadium: Ullevaal Stadion; Attendance: 2,780; Referee: Jonas Eriksson (Sweden)

12 May 2005 4	Brann (Norway)	0–1	(Sweden) IFK Göteborg	Bergen, Norway
18:00		Report	Svensson 34'	Stadium: Brann Stadion; Attendance: 1,813; Referee: Claus Bo Larsen (Denmark)

=== Tippeligaen ===
==== Results summary ====
Overall								Home						Away					
Pld	W	D	L	GF	GA	GD	Pts	W	D	L	GF	GA	GD	W	D	L	GF	GA	GD
26	10	7	9	43	32	+11	37	8	3	2	29	11	+18	2	4	7	14	21	−7

==== Results by round ====
Round	1	2	3	4	5	6	7	8	9	10	11	12	13	14	15	16	17	18	19	20	21	22	23	24	25	26
Ground	H	A	H	A	H	A	H	A	H	A	H	A	H	A	H	A	H	A	H	A	H	A	H	A	H	A
Result	W	L	D	W	L	W	W	W	W	D	W	D	W	L	L	D	D	L	W	L	W	L	W	L	D	D
Position	3	6	7	4	5	3	3	4	3	3	2	2	2	4	4	5	6	6	6	6	6	6	6	6	6	6

Updated to match(es) played on 29 October 2005. Source: see below
A = Away; H = Home; W = Win; D = Draw; L = Loss

==== Results ====
11 April 2005 1	Brann	2–0	Molde	Bergen
19:00	Scharner 31'; Winters 63'	Report		Stadium: Brann Stadion; Attendance: 14,106; Referee: Brage Sandmoen

17 April 2005 2	Vålerenga	2–1	Brann	Oslo
20:05	Berre 47', 90'	Report	Sæternes 50'	Stadium: Ullevaal Stadion; Attendance: 15,447; Referee: Roy Helge Olsen

25 April 2005 3	Brann	0–0	Tromsø	Bergen
19:00		Report		Stadium: Brann Stadion; Attendance: 14,664; Referee: Tom Henning Øvrebø

2 May 2005 4	Aalesund	1–3	Brann	Ålesund
19:00	Olsen 77'	Report	Winters 26'; Dos Santos 56' (o.g.); Sæternes 90+3'	Stadium: Color Line Stadion; Attendance: 10,600; Referee: Kjell Alseth

5 May 2005 5	Brann	2–3	Bodø/Glimt	Bergen
20:05	Scharner 5'; Winters 59'	Report	Ludvigsen 59'; Sakariassen 22' (pen.), 38'	Stadium: Brann Stadion; Attendance: 12,880; Referee: Roy Helge Olsen

9 May 2005 6	Fredrikstad	2–3	Brann	Fredrikstad
19:00	Viikmäe 72'; Wiig 74'	Report	Kvisvik 16'; Sæternes 18', 26'	Stadium: Fredrikstad Stadion; Attendance: 8,860; Referee: Per Ivar Staberg

16 May 2005 7	Brann	6–2	Lillestrøm	Bergen
18:00	Soma 30'; Sæternes 35', 57', 66'; Kvisvik 52'; Bjarnason 60'	Report	Mifsud 45'; Koren 86'	Stadium: Brann Stadion; Attendance: 17,503; Referee: Tommy Skjerven

22 May 2005 8	Start	3–2	Brann	Kristiansand
18:00	Johnsen 41'; Pedersen 86'; Midttun Lie 90+1'	Report	Scharner 50'; Andresen 69'	Stadium: Kristiansand Stadion; Attendance: 10,962; Referee: Svein Oddvar Moen

29 May 2005 9	Brann	4–0	Lyn	Bergen
20:10	Miller 1'; Scharner 37'; Kvisvik 57' (pen.); Sæternes 64'	Report		Stadium: Brann Stadion; Attendance: 12,282; Referee: Kjell Alseth

13 June 2005 10	Viking	0–0	Brann	Stavanger
19:00		Report		Stadium: Viking Stadion; Attendance: 14,616; Referee: Roy Helge Olsen

19 June 2005 11	Brann	4–1	Rosenborg	Bergen
20:20	Miller 6' (pen.), 30', 89'; Kvisvik 65'	Report	Storflor 12'	Stadium: Brann Stadion; Attendance: 17,359; Referee: Tom Henning Øvrebø

26 June 2005 12	Odd Grenland	0–0	Brann	Skien
18:00		Report		Stadium: Odd Stadion; Attendance: 4,075; Referee: Svein-Erik Edvartsen

3 July 2005 13	Brann	2–0	HamKam	Bergen
18:00	Winters 28'; Scharner 90+2'	Report		Stadium: Brann Stadion; Attendance: 16,536; Referee: Svein Oddvar Moen

23 July 2005 14	Molde	3–1	Brann	Molde
16:00	Ohr 14'; Rudi 19'; Kallio 53'	Report	Winters 51'	Stadium: Aker Stadion; Attendance: 10,309; Referee: Kjell Alseth

30 July 2005 15	Brann	1–2	Vålerenga	Bergen
19:05	Sæternes 18'	Report	Iversen 26' (pen.) dos Santos 55'	Stadium: Brann Stadion; Attendance: 16,116; Referee: Tommy Skjerven

3 August 2005 16	Tromsø	1–1	Brann	Tromsø
19:00	Årst 63'	Report	Winters 39'	Stadium: Alfheim Stadion; Attendance: 4,302; Referee: Brage Sandmoen

7 August 2005 17	Brann	0–0	Aalesund	Bergen
18:00		Report		Stadium: Brann Stadion; Attendance: 14,115; Referee: Espen Berntsen

14 August 2005 18	Bodø/Glimt	2–1	Brann	Bodø
18:00	Brattbakk 40'; Sakariassen 74'	Report	Knudsen 58'	Stadium: Aspmyra Stadion; Attendance: 5,363; Referee: Stig Rune Krokdal

29 August 2005 19	Brann	4–0	Fredrikstad	Bergen
19:00	Huseklepp 1'; Macallister 57'; Andresen 62' (pen.); Scharner 90+2'	Report		Stadium: Brann Stadion; Attendance: 12,713; Referee: Svein-Erik Edvartsen

11 September 2005 20	Lillestrøm	1–0	Brann	Lillestrøm
20:20	Soma 28' (o.g.)	Report		Stadium: Åråsen Stadion; Attendance: 6,638; Referee: Tom Henning Øvrebø

19 September 2005 21	Brann	1–0	Start	Bergen
19:00	Winters 54'	Report		Stadium: Brann Stadion; Attendance: 14,563; Referee: Brage Sandmoen

25 September 2005 22	Lyn	1–0	Brann	Oslo
18:00	Obasi 9'	Report		Stadium: Ullevaal Stadion; Attendance: 5,723; Referee: Espen Berntsen

3 October 2005 23	Brann	2–1	Viking	Bergen
19:00	Miller 65'; Hanstveit 84'	Report	Østenstad 18'	Stadium: Brann Stadion; Attendance: 14,496; Referee: Per Ivar Staberg

16 October 2005 24	Rosenborg	4–1	Brann	Trondheim
20:05	Helstad 35'; Skjelbred 36'; Johnsen 49', 69'	Report	Knudsen 41'	Stadium: Lerkendal Stadion; Attendance: 19,462; Referee: Roy Helge Olsen

23 October 2005 25	Brann	2–2	Odd Grenland	Bergen
18:00	Winters 10'; Miller 75'	Report	Occéan 15'; Ruud 68'	Stadium: Brann Stadion; Attendance: 15,592; Referee: Brage Sandmoen

29 October 2005 26	HamKam	1–1	Brann	Hamar
18:00	Bjerke 31'	Report	Macallister 78'	Stadium: Briskeby Gressbane; Attendance: 6,141; Referee: Tommy Skjerven

==== Table ====
Pos	Team	Pld	W	D	L	GF	GA	GD	Pts	Qualification or relegation
4	Lillestrøm	26	12	6	8	37	31	+6	42	
5	Viking	26	12	5	9	37	32	+5	41	
6	Brann	26	10	7	9	43	32	+11	37	Qualification for the UEFA Cup first qualifying round (Note: Brann qualified for the UEFA Cup first qualifying round through the UEFA Fair Play ranking award.)
7	Rosenborg	26	10	4	12	50	42	+8	34	
8	Tromsø	26	8	10	8	31	30	+1	34	

Source: fotball.no
Rules for classification: 1) points; 2) goal difference; 3) number of goals scored.

=== Norwegian Cup ===
7 May 2005 Round 1	Gneist	0–5	Brann	Bergen
16:00		Report	Hanstveit 16'; Macallister 30', 47', 56'; Spurkeland 86'	Stadium: Liland Kunstgress; Attendance: 1,525; Referee: Asbjørn Olsen

19 May 2005 Round 2	Radøy/Manger	1–3	Brann	Radøy
18:00	Sanne 79' (o.g.)	Report	Kvisvik 31' (pen.); Hanstveit 72'; Sæternes 90'	Stadium: Sletta Idrettsplass; Attendance: 1,700; Referee: Petter Toppe

16 June 2005 Round 3	Løv-Ham	0–1	Brann	Voss
16:00		Report	Miller 44'	Stadium: Prestegardsmoen Kunstgras; Attendance: 1,013; Referee: Kristoffer Helgerud

29 June 2005 Round 4	Brann	3–2	Aalesund	Bergen
18:00	Guntveit 13'; Miller 64', 73'	Report	Holm 41'; Hoseth 90'	Stadium: Brann Stadion; Attendance: 5,979; Referee: Espen Berntsen

20 August 2005 Quarter Final	Vålerenga	2–1	Brann	Oslo
16:00	Hulsker 15', 24'	Report	Miller 61'	Stadium: Ullevaal Stadion; Attendance: 13,882; Referee: Per Ivar Staberg

=== UEFA Cup ===
==== Qualifying rounds ====
11 August 2005 Second qualifying round 1st leg	Brann (Norway)	0–0	(Finland) AC Allianssi	Bergen, Norway
19:00		Report		Stadium: Brann Stadion; Attendance: 2,597; Referee: Ihor Ishchenko (Ukraine)

25 August 2005 Second qualifying round 2nd leg	AC Allianssi (Finland)	0–2 (0–2 agg.)	(Norway) Brann	Vantaa, Finland
20:00		Report	Ludvigsen 58'; Miller 88'	Stadium: ISS Stadion; Attendance: 1,372; Referee: David Malcolm (Northern Ireland)

==== First round ====
15 September 2005 1st leg	Brann (Norway)	1–2	(Russia) Lokomotiv Moscow	Bergen, Norway
19:00	Winters 45'	Report	Ruopolo 71'; Lebedenko 77'	Stadium: Brann Stadion; Attendance: 5,100; Referee: Dick van Egmond (Netherlands)

29 September 2005 2nd leg	Lokomotiv Moscow (Russia)	3–2 (5–3 agg.)	(Norway) Brann	Moscow, Russia
18:00	Loskov 61'; Asatiani 77'; Bilyaletdinov 90+1'	Report	Macallister 47'; Miller 74'	Stadium: Lokomotiv Stadium; Attendance: 13,425; Referee: Markus Nobs (Switzerland)
