= 2004 Norwegian Football Cup final =

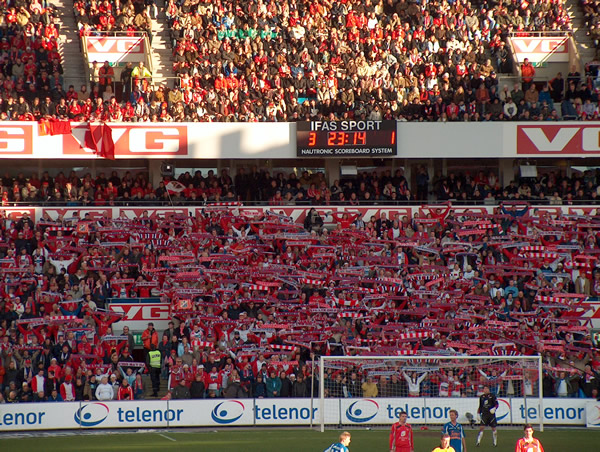
- Lyn's supporters at the final
- Event: 2004 Norwegian Football Cup
Brann	Lyn
4	1
- Date: 7 November 2004
- Venue: Ullevaal Stadion, Oslo
- Referee: Espen Berntsen
- Attendance: 24,458

The 2004 Norwegian Football Cup final was the final match of the 2004 Norwegian Football Cup, the 99th season of the Norwegian Football Cup, the premier Norwegian football cup competition organized by the Football Association of Norway (NFF). The match was played on 7 November 2004 at the Ullevaal Stadion in Oslo, and opposed two Tippeligaen sides Brann and Lyn. Brann defeated Lyn 4–1 to claim the Norwegian Cup for a sixth time in their history.

== Route to the final ==
Brann			Round	Lyn		
Åkra	A	9–0	Round 1	Salangen	A	7–1
Norheimsund	A	5–0	Round 2	Østsiden	A	2–1
Hødd	H	6–0	Round 3	Frigg	H	3–2
Bodø/Glimt	A	3–3 (6–5 p)	Round 4	Vard Haugesund	A	5–0
Bryne	H	3–2	Quarterfinal	HamKam	H	3–1
Stabæk	A	3–1 aet	Semifinal	Lillestrøm	H	1–0

== Match ==
=== Details ===
7 November 2004
13:15 CET (UTC+1)

Brann	4–1	Lyn
Sæternes 4', 13', 34'; Winters 8'	Report	Markstedt 11'

Ullevaal Stadion, Oslo
Attendance: 24,458
Referee: Espen Berntsen (Vang)

Brann	Lyn

Brann:
GK	12	(Norway) Håkon Opdal
DF	2	(Norway) Jan Tore Ophaug
DF	18	(Iceland) Ólafur Örn Bjarnason
DF	8	(Norway) Ragnvald Soma	(yellow card) 29'
DF	15	(Norway) Erlend Hanstveit (c)
MF	5	(Norway) Martin Knudsen		(substituted off) 78'
MF	6	(Norway) Helge Haugen
MF	23	(Austria) Paul Scharner
MF	27	(Norway) Raymond Kvisvik		(substituted off) 86'
FW	7	(Scotland) Robbie Winters		(substituted off) 85'
FW	10	(Norway) Bengt Sæternes
Substitutions:
GK	1	(Norway) Johan Thorbjørnsen
MF	11	(Norway) Kristian Ystaas
FW	14	(Norway) Arve Walde		(substituted on) 86'
MF	16	(Scotland) Charlie Miller	(yellow card) 90'	(substituted on) 85'
MF	19	(Norway) Tom Sanne		(substituted on) 78'
FW	21	(Norway) Thomas Lund
DF	28	(Norway) Fredrik Klock
Coach:
(Norway) Mons Ivar Mjelde

Lyn:
GK	26	(Oman) Ali Al-Habsi
DF	4	(Norway) Kristian Flittie Onstad		(substituted off) 70'
DF	22	(Norway) Tommy Berntsen (c)
DF	5	(Denmark) Steven Lustü
DF	19	(Norway) Yngvar Håkonsen	(yellow card) 90'
MF	7	(Norway) Tomasz Sokolowski
MF	15	(Norway) Øyvind Leonhardsen
MF	2	(Norway) Mounir Hamoud		(substituted off) 60'
MF	23	(Norway) Lars Kristian Eriksen		(substituted off) 45'
FW	25	(Sweden) Peter Markstedt
FW	10	(Norway) Jan Derek Sørensen
Substitutions:
GK	1	(Portugal) Nuno Marques
FW	6	(Norway) Ole Bjørn Sundgot		(substituted on) 70'
MF	9	(South Korea) Cha Ji-Ho		(substituted on) 60'
FW	16	(Norway) Christian Aas
MF	17	(Norway) Christoffer Dahl		(substituted on) 45'
MF	11	(Norway) Bjarne Ingebretsen
MF	66	(Norway) Leif Gunnar Smerud
Coach:
(Norway) Hans Knudsen (Norway) Espen Olafsen
