= Sakariassen =

Sakariassen is a Norwegian surname. Notable people with the surname include:

- Eirik Faret Sakariassen (born 1991), Norwegian politician
- Håvard Sakariassen (born 1976), Norwegian footballer
