= Håkonsen =

Håkonsen is a surname. Notable people with the surname include:

- Kjell Håkonsen (1935–2011), Norwegian harness racing coach and coachman
- Terje Håkonsen (born 1974), Norwegian snowboarder
- Yngvar Håkonsen (born 1978), Norwegian footballer
