= Vetle =

Vetle is a masculine Norwegian given name and may refer to:

- Vetle Andersen (born 1964), Norwegian footballer
- Vetle Auklend (born 2005), Norwegian footballer
- Vetle Vinje (born 1962), Norwegian rower
- Vetle Vislie (1858–1933), Norwegian educator and writer

== See also ==
- Vetle Skagastølstind, mountain in Norway
