= Klaus Murbræch =

Norwegian footballer (born 1975)

Personal information
- Date of birth: 13 January 1975 (age 51)
- Position: Forward

Youth career
- Søgne
- Start

Senior career*
Years	Team	Apps	(Gls)
1993–1996	Start	11	(0)
1996	→ Vigør (loan)		
1997	Ullern		

International career
1994	Norway U18	3	(1)
- * Club domestic league appearances and goals

Klaus Murbræch (born 13 January 1975) is a retired Norwegian football striker.

He played youth football for Søgne IL. He made his debut for IK Start in 1993, and also played a couple of games in the 1994 Eliteserien, but without scoring. In 1996 he went on loan to FK Vigør. After one season in Ullern IF he left that club ahead of the 1998 season.

Murbræch became a physician and took the PhD degree in 2017 with the thesis Cardiovascular status in long term survivors of lymphomas and malignant ovarian germ cell tumors.
