= Sven Fredrik Stray =

Norwegian footballer (born 1985)

Personal information
- Date of birth: 29 January 1985 (age 41)
- Place of birth: Oslo, Norway
- Height: 1.89 m (6 ft 2 in)
- Position: Defender

Team information
- Current team: Fløy
- Number: 4

Youth career
- Vigør

Senior career*
Years	Team	Apps	(Gls)
2004–2006	Mandalskameratene	49	(0)
2007–2009	Odd Grenland	17	(2)
2009	→ Bryne FK (loan)	13	(1)
2010–2012	Flekkerøy	25	(0)
2013–2014	Jerv	31	(2)
2015–2017	Arendal	42	(0)
2017–	Fløy		

International career^{‡}
2005	Norway U21	1	(0)
- * Club domestic league appearances and goals as of 20 July 2017 ‡ National team caps and goals as of 19 January 2005

Sven Fredrik Stray (born 29 January 1985) is a Norwegian professional footballer who plays as a defender for Norwegian club Arendal.

== Club career ==
His former clubs are FK Vigør, Mandalskameratene and Odd Grenland. In 2009, he was loaned out to Bryne FK. Ahead of the 2010 season he joined Flekkerøy IL. Ahead of the 2015 season he went from FK Jerv to Arendal Fotball. In mid-2017 he stepped down two notches to Fløy, wanting more time with his family. Fløy won promotion to the third tier.

== International ==
On 19 January 2005 Stray making his debut after being named in the starting line-up with Norway U21 in a match of friendly match against South Korea U21.
