= Peter Markstedt =

Swedish footballer and manager

Personal information
- Full name: Sven Peter Markstedt
- Date of birth: 11 January 1972 (age 54)
- Place of birth: Västerås, Sweden
- Height: 1.90 m (6 ft 3 in)
- Positions: Centre-back; striker

Youth career
- Västerås SK

Senior career*
Years	Team	Apps	(Gls)
1991–1997	Västerås SK	153	(17)
1997–1999	Barnsley	9	(0)
1999–2001	Helsingborgs IF	9	(0)
2000	→ Västerås SK (loan)	26	(10)
2001–2003	Hammarby IF	61	(20)
2004	Lyn	24	(6)
2005–2006	Västerås SK	35	(2)
2013	Syrianska IF	1	(0)
Total		318	(55)

Managerial career
- 2005: Västerås SK (interim)
- 2010–2011: IK Franke
- 2011: Västerås SK
- 2012–2014: Syrianska IF (assistant)
- 2015: Västerås SK
- * Club domestic league appearances and goals

Sven Peter Markstedt (Swedish pronunciation: [ˈpeː.tɛr ˈmark.stɛt]; born 11 January 1972) is a Swedish former football manager and professional footballer who played as a centre-back and also as a striker.

== Career ==
Born in Västerås, Markstedt started his professional career at hometown club Västerås SK in 1991. He played in the 1997 Allsvenskan campaign which was only the fourth time the team played in the top flight and the first time since 1978, but ended relegated after losing to BK Häcken in the relegation play-offs.

In November 1997, after the end of the Swedish season he was sold to Barnsley for £250k. Playing as a centre back, he made his debut in the Premier League in a shock 1–0 win against Liverpool at Anfield in the same month and also played the whole match when Barnsley defeated Manchester United in the FA Cup in the same season. At the end of the season, the club was relegated to the First Division and the player suffered his second top-flight relegation in less than a year. He barely played in his second season at Barnsley and returned to Sweden in 1999, joining Helsingborgs IF.

At Helsingborg, Markstedt played nine league matches as the club won the 1999 Allsvenskan. He returned to Västerås SK on loan in 2000 and ended as the club's top scorer in the 2000 Superettan. In 2001, the played signed for Hammarby IF, winning his second Allsvenskan title. He was the club top scorer in the 2002 Allsvenskan and joint fourth overall and left the club in the end of 2003 after finishing the league in second place.

He moved to Norwegian-based Lyn in 2004 and scored in the 4–1 defeat to SK Brann at the 2004 Norwegian Football Cup Final. After the birth of his son in March 2005, he decided to move back to Västerås SK in his third spell with the club despite offers from Allsvenkan clubs and retired from playing in 2006, but made a brief comeback in 2013 when working as an assistant manager at Syrianska IF.

== Management career ==
Markstedt had his first job as a coach as an interim manager in 2005 while playing for Västerås SK in a match against Väsby United after being handed the duties one hour before the kick-off. He managed IK Franke in 2010 and 2011, also managing Västerås SK in 2011. He was hired by Syrianska IF as an assistant coach in 2012. He left the club in 2014 after difficults to share the time at the club and his own company.

He returned to his hometown club Västerås SK in 2015 as a joint head coach with Leif Berg. He left the club at the end of the season claiming time constraints with his own business.

== Personal life ==
Markstedt is one of the founders and owners of KidsBrandStore, a Swedish children's clothing shop founded in 2011.

== Honours ==
Helsingborgs IF

- Allsvenskan: 1999

Hammarby IF

- Allsvenskan: 2001

Lyn Fotball

- Norwegian Football Cup: 2004 (runner-up)
