= Tore Løvland =

Norwegian footballer (born 1965)

Personal information
- Date of birth: 8 November 1965 (age 60)
- Positions: Forward; defender (Note: Løvland played a forward earlier in his career, and as a defender later in his career.)

Senior career*
Years	Team	Apps	(Gls)
–1986	Vigør		
1987–1996	Start		
- * Club domestic league appearances and goals

Tore Løvland (born 8 November 1965) is a retired Norwegian football defender.

He joined IK Start from FK Vigør ahead of the 1990 season, and remained there throughout 1996, amassing 163 first-tier games and 11 goals.
