= Lars Martin Engedal =

Norwegian footballer (born 1983)

Personal information
- Date of birth: 11 September 1983 (age 43)
- Position: Defender

Youth career
- FK Vigør

Senior career*
Years	Team	Apps	(Gls)
2003–2008	IK Start		
2009	Moss FK		
2010	Flekkerøy IL		

International career
- Norway U-21 MNT
- * Club domestic league appearances and goals

Lars Martin Engedal (born 11 September 1983) is a Norwegian football defender.

As a youth player Engedal played for FK Vigør. He then joined IK Start at the age of sixteen, debuted for the senior team in 2003 and played there until 2008. He joined Moss FK ahead of the 2009 season. After the 2009 season he joined Flekkerøy IL.

He has been capped for the Norwegian national under-21 team.
