= Leif Otto Paulsen =

Norwegian footballer (born 1985)

Leif Otto Paulsen (born 13 January 1985) is a Norwegian football midfielder who is currently the playing coach of FK Vigør.

Paulsen played youth football for FK Vigør, then made his senior debut for IK Start in 2004, and his Norwegian Premier League debut in 2006. He was later loaned out to Mandalskameratene.

In the latter part of 2009 he was loaned to Bryne FK, and left Start afterwards. He instead became playing coach of FK Vigør.
