= Janez Zavrl (footballer) =

Slovenian footballer

Personal information
- Full name: Janez Zavrl
- Date of birth: 25 December 1982 (age 43)
- Place of birth: Ljubljana, SFR Yugoslavia
- Height: 1.88 m (6 ft 2 in)
- Position: Midfielder

Youth career
- Olimpija

Senior career*
Years	Team	Apps	(Gls)
2001–2003	Olimpija	6	(0)
2003–2005	Ljubljana	47	(8)
2005	Domžale	15	(0)
2006	Brann	7	(0)
2006–2008	Interblock	38	(1)
2009	Celje	15	(0)
2009	Livar	5	(0)
2010	Triglav Kranj	19	(1)
2011–2012	Shenzhen Ruby	13	(0)
2012–2015	Radomlje	88	(12)
2015–2016	SV Dellach/Gail	41	(0)
2017–2018	SV Rosegg	34	(3)
2018–2019	SV Egg	33	(2)
Total		361	(27)

International career
2001–2003	Slovenia U20	5	(0)
2001–2003	Slovenia U21	13	(1)
2006	Slovenia	4	(0)
2006	Slovenia B	2	(0)
- * Club domestic league appearances and goals

Janez Zavrl (born 25 December 1982) is a Slovenian retired footballer.

== Career ==
He has been capped four times for the Slovenian national team. Zavrl signed for Brann in 2006. In October 2006, Zavrl decided to return to Slovenia. Zavrl made seven Tippeligaen and three UEFA Cup appearances for Brann.
