= Vetle Andersen =

Norwegian footballer (born 1964)

Personal information
- Full name: Vetle Gregle Andersen
- Date of birth: 20 April 1964 (age 62)
- Place of birth: Kristiansand, Norway
- Position: Defender

Senior career*
Years	Team	Apps	(Gls)
1983–1984	Start	5	(0)
1984–1986	Blau-Weiß 90 Berlin	6	(0)
1986–1987	Start	16	(0)
1987–1988	Dunfermline Athletic	18	(0)
1988	Viking		
1989	Lyngby		
1989	West Bromwich Albion	1	(0)
1991–1993	Halmstad	78	(3)
1994	Lyngby		
1995	Start	16	(0)
1996	Vigør		
1996–1997	Raith Rovers	18	(0)
1997–1998	Inverness Caledonian Thistle	32	(0)
1998	IS Halmia		
- * Club domestic league appearances and goals

Vetle Gregle Andersen (born 20 April 1964) is a Norwegian former footballer who played as a defender. Andersen played in a number of countries, including most Scandinavian and British nations.
