= Oluwasegun Abiodun =

Nigerian footballer (born 1984)

Segun Abiodun
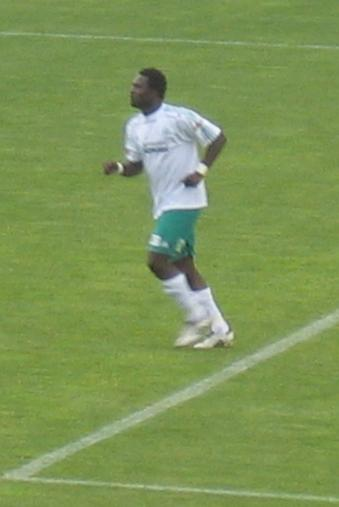
- Abiodun for Hamarkameratene

Personal information
- Full name: Oluwasegun Abiodun
- Date of birth: 5 December 1984 (age 41)
- Place of birth: Maiduguri, Borno State, Nigeria
- Height: 1.82 m (5 ft 11 1/2 in)
- Position: Striker

Youth career
- Shooting Stars

Senior career*
Years	Team	Apps	(Gls)
2001	Julius Berger		
2002	Maccabi Haifa	0	(0)
2003–2004	Al-Wahda		
2004–2008	HamKam	79	(23)
2009–2010	Skeid	46	(17)
2010	Internațional	2	(0)

International career
- Nigeria U-23
- * Club domestic league appearances and goals as of 31 December 2009

Oluwasegun Abiodun (born 5 December 1984) is a Nigerian football striker who currently is free agent. His name, Oluwasegun, means "God has been victorious".

== Career ==
=== Club ===
==== Early career ====
His previous clubs include Nigerian team Julius Berger, Israeli Maccabi Haifa and Al-Wahda in the United Arab Emirates. Abiodun arrived at Maccabi Haifa to replace Yakubu, but after the latter stayed with the Israeli club Abiodun left Haifa. His first match for the club was a successful one since he got onto the scoresheet in an early round UEFA Champions League match after starting the match on the bench.

==== Norway ====
He moved from Al Wahda to Hamarkameratene in September 2004. While at Hamarkameratene he became noted for his goalscoring abilities and speed. In December 2008 it was announced that Abiodun would join Skeid for the 2009 season

=== National team ===
Abiodun has played for the Nigerian Olympic team who came very close at qualifying for the 2004 Olympics. but has never featured for the senior squad.

== Career statistics ==
Season	Club	Division	League		Cup		Continental		Total	
Season	Club	Division	Apps	Goals	Apps	Goals	Apps	Goals	Apps	Goals
2004	HamKam	Tippeligaen	6	0	0	0	0	0	6	0
2005	HamKam	Tippeligaen	13	2	2	0	0	0	15	2
2006	HamKam	Tippeligaen	16	5	2	0	0	0	18	5
2007	HamKam	Adeccoligaen	22	15	0	0	0	0	0	0
2008	HamKam	Tippeligaen	22	1	1	0	0	0	23	1
2009	Skeid	Adeccoligaen	20	7	0	0	0	0	20	7
2010	Skeid	2. divisjon	26	10	0	0	0	0	26	10
2009–10	Internațional	Liga I	2	0	0	0	0	0	2	0
Career Total			127	40	5	0	0	0	132	40
