= Nuno Marques (footballer) =

Portuguese football coach and former player

Personal information
- Full name: Nuno Alexandre Nogueira Marques
- Date of birth: 17 March 1981 (age 45)
- Place of birth: Tomar, Portugal
- Height: 1.87 m (6 ft 2 in)
- Position: Goalkeeper

Youth career
- –1998: União Tomar
- 1998–1999: Benfica
- Estrela Amadora
2004–2005	Lyn Fotball	3	(0)
2005	FK Tønsberg	4	(0)
2006–2008	Bryne FK	5	(0)
2008–2013	Notodden FK	39	(0)

International career
Years	Team	Apps	(Gls)
	Portugal U17	8	(0)
	Portugal U19	6	(0)
	Portugal U21	5	(0)

Managerial career
- 2016–: Notodden FK (goalkeeper coach)

Nuno Alexandre Nogueira Marques (born 17 March 1981) is a Portuguese football coach and former goalkeeper who serves as goalkeeping coach for Notodden FK in Norway.

== Norway ==
Arranging to a two-year agreement with Lyn of the Norwegian Premier League in February 2004, Marques was second-string goalkeeper behind Ali Al-Habsi and was sent to FK Tønsberg for the rest of the 2005 season. Next, he trialed with Bryne, who were in the Norwegian 1. divisjon, earning a contract lasting until 2008. Despite being the second-choice goalkeeper at Bryne, the Benfica youth graduate started the first round of the 2007 Norwegian First Division away to Løv-Ham, earning praise from his coach despite losing the game. However, the Portuguese goalkeeper picked up a knee injury in May that year, leaving him out for the rest of the season. By 2008, Marques was at Notodden FK, then of the Norwegian First Division, repudiating rumors of Greek clubs signing him.
