= Knut Walde =

Norwegian footballer (born 1981)

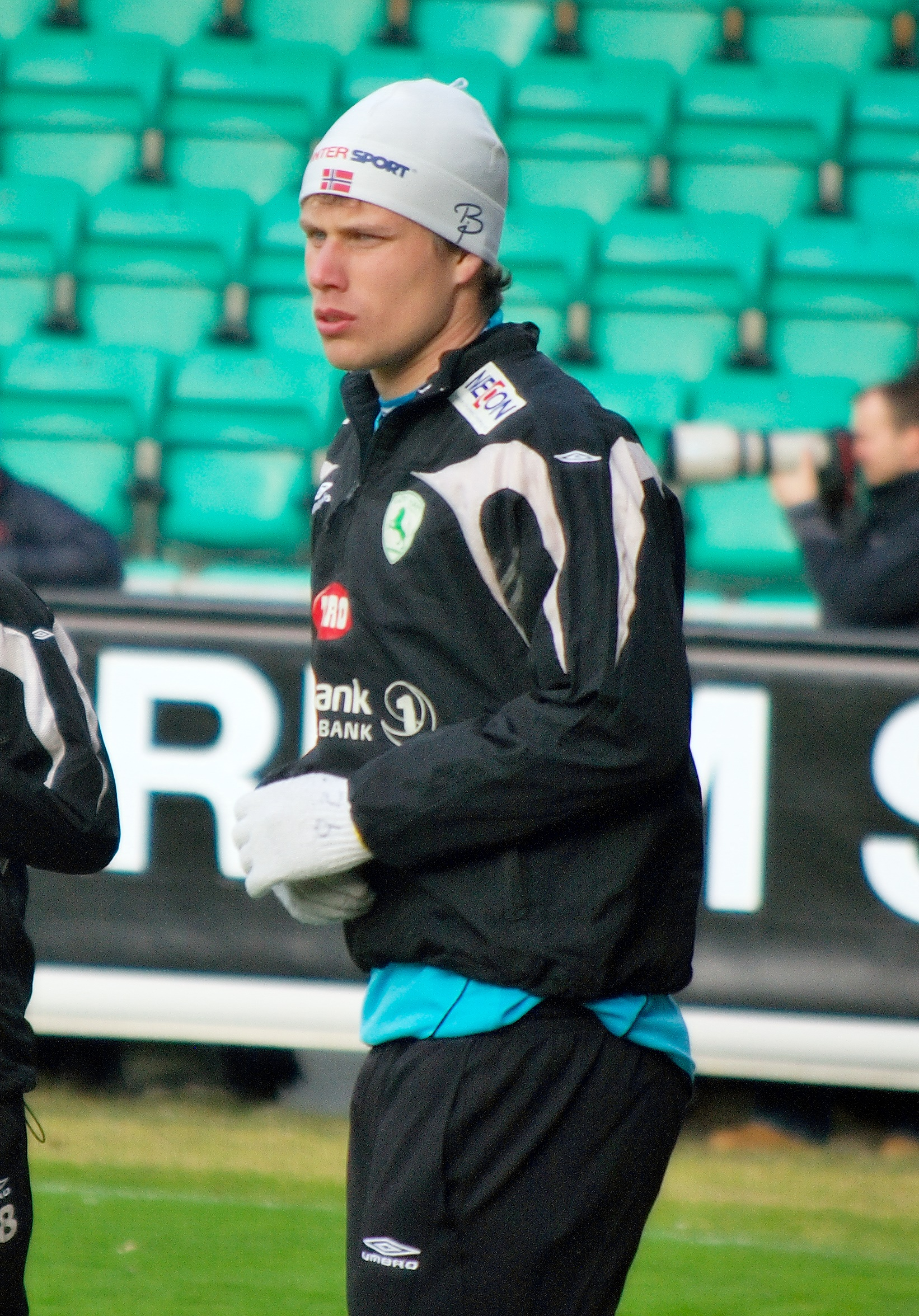

Personal information
- Full name: Knut Grøvan Walde
- Date of birth: 16 June 1981 (age 45)
- Place of birth: Bergen, Norway
- Height: 1.92 m (6 ft 3 1/2 in)
- Position: Centre back

Team information
- Current team: Flekkerøy

Youth career
- Trane
- Fergus Falls High School

Senior career*
Years	Team	Apps	(Gls)
2001–2003	Brann	26	(0)
2004	→ Haugesund (loan)	21	(2)
2005–2007	Løv-Ham	53	(2)
2007–2009	Brann	3	(0)
2008–2009	→ Løv-Ham (loan)	46	(0)
2010–present	Flekkerøy		

International career
2002	Norway U21	2	(0)
- * Club domestic league appearances and goals as of 6 November 2009

Knut Walde (born 16 June 1981) is a Norwegian footballer who currently plays for Flekkerøy IL. He is the older brother of Arve Walde.

== Career ==
Walde found success on the highest level in his first season as a senior. He played 23 of 26 league matches for SK Brann and got two caps for the Norwegian U21 national football team in 2002. Though a good season for Walde personally, SK Branns had a catastrophic 2002 season, and were close to being relegated. The club's coach and the man responsible for Walde's push, Teitur Thordarson, was sacked and the club's junior coach Mons Ivar Mjelde took over as head coach. After Mjelder took over, Walde found it hard to gain a regular spot on the team, with only 3 league matches in 2003. He was loaned out to FK Haugesund in 2004, but could not help the club from being relegated from the Adeccoliga. He returned to Brann in 2005, only to be loaned out again, this time to the local Adeccoliga club Løv-Ham. The transfer was made permanent the autumn of 2005.

=== Løv-Ham ===
Walde impressed both local media and opponents in the Adeccoliga, and was one of the main reasons for Løv-Ham dodging relegation in both 2005 and 2006. Despite being one of the smallest team in the league and close to be relegated, Løv-Ham was one of the clubs in the league with the fewest goals scored against them. This was highly attributed to Walde and his partner in the center defense, Kristian Vange. Walde was also made captain for Løv-Ham before the 2006 seasons. He returned to Løv-Ham on loan again before the 2008-season.

=== Back in Brann ===
After the 2006 season, several Tippeliga teams showed an interest in Walde, but he chose to stay in Løv-Ham, due to his studies in Bergen. He continued to impress in the Adeccoliga and before the transfer-window opened on 1 July 2007, Sandefjord once again tried to get Walde's signature. However, an SK Brann with only 3 centre backs also signaled an interest in Walde. After Brann's first choice, Per "Pelle" Nilsson showed himself too expensive for Brann, the club turned their focus to Walde. The parts came to an agreement on 2 July, and so Walde was once again a part of the SK Brann squad. He did, however, not reach the expectations, and was, once again, loaned out to Løv-Ham the following season.

After the 2009 season, Walde decide to take a break from football to pursuit his studies in physiatrics. He carried out his medical service (turnustjeneste) at Stavanger University Hospital. In the summer of 2010, eight months later, he signed for Second Division team Flekkerøy IL.

== Honours ==
=== Norway ===
- Norwegian Premier League: 2007
