= Vestlandshallen =

Indoor arena in Bergen, Norway

Coordinates: 60°28′7.87″N 5°18′59.03″E

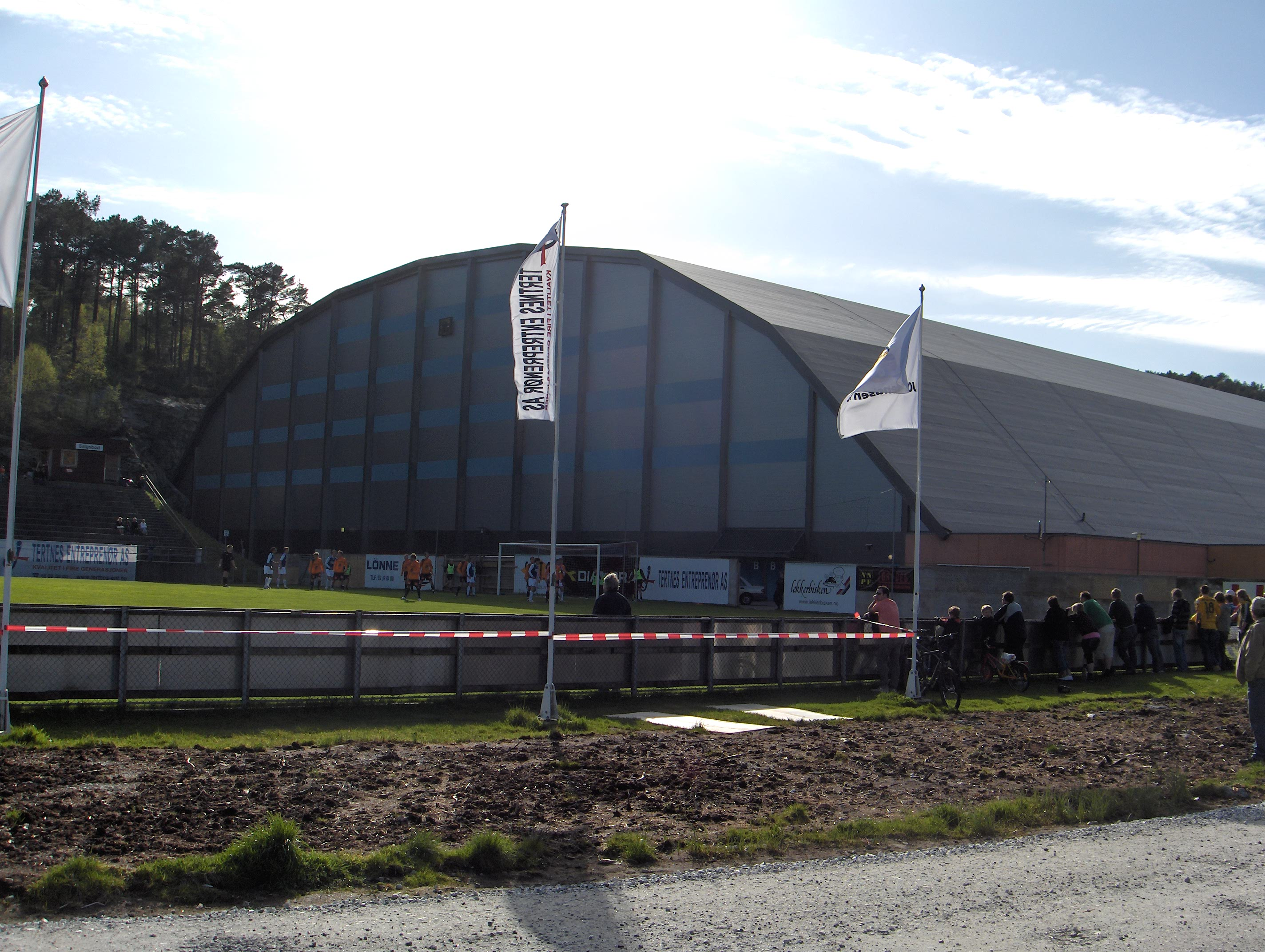

Vestlandshallen is an indoor arena in Bergen, Norway. It has a capacity of 5,000-9,000 people.

It usually hosts various indoor sporting events as well as music concerts.
