= Eirik Faret Sakariassen =

Norwegian politician (born 1991)

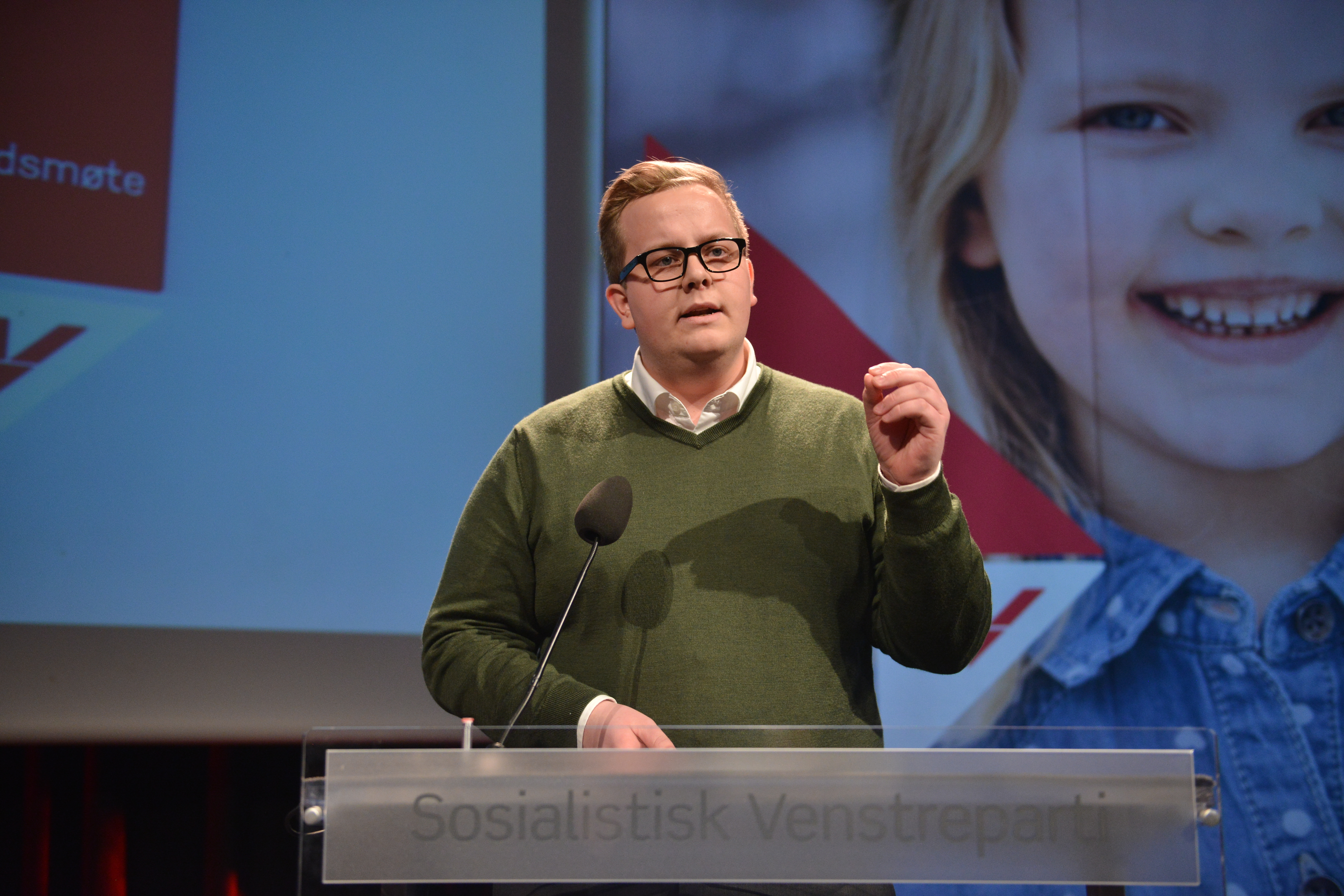
Eirik Faret Sakariassen under Svs landsmøte i 2015

Eirik Faret Sakariassen (born 28 January 1991) is a Norwegian politician for the Socialist Left Party.

He was first elected to Stavanger city council in 2011. He served as a deputy representative to the Parliament of Norway from Rogaland during the term 2017–2021.
