= FK Vigør =

Norwegian football club

Vigør
- Full name: Fotballklubben Vigør
- Nickname: The Talent Factory
- Founded: 5 October 1918; 107 years ago
- Ground: Hellemyr kunstgress, Kristiansand
- Chairman: Helge Konradsen
- Manager: Kjetil Ruthford Pedersen
- League: Fourth Division
- 2024: Third Division group 2, 14th of 14 (relegated)
Home colours	Away colours

FK Vigør is a Norwegian football club from Hellemyr, Kristiansand. Vigør is the Norwegian name for vigor. The club colors are brown and white, and the club was founded on 5 October 1918.

The men's team currently resides in the Fourth Division, the fifth tier of Norwegian football, having last played in the Second Division in 2000. It contested a playoff to win promotion to the First Division in 1996, but failed.

FK Vigør also has a women's section. It fielded a senior team in the league system in 2008, but not in 2023.

== Former players ==
Many former Vigør players have gone on to play professionally in the Norwegian Premier League or elsewhere.

Goalkeepers

- Espen Johnsen
- Rune Nilssen
- Kenneth Udjus
- Benjamin Boujar
- Jasper Silva Torkildsen

Defenders

- Jesper Daland
- Marius Johnsen
- Lars Martin Engedal
- Steffen Hagen
- Knut Henry Haraldsen
- Sven Fredrik Stray
- Yngvar Håkonsen
- Vetle Andersen
- Tore Løvland
- Per Christian Osmundsen

Midfielders

- Tobias Christensen
- Leif Otto Paulsen
- Christer Kleiven
- Kristofer Hæstad
- Sven Otto Birkeland
- Erlend Segberg
- Martin Høyland

Strikers

- Lars-Jørgen Salvesen
- Tore André Dahlum
- Andreas Lund
- Thom Jarle Thomassen
- Kjetil Bøe
- Espen Daland
- Bjørn Vidar Gundersen
