= Søren Berg =

Danish footballer (born 1976)

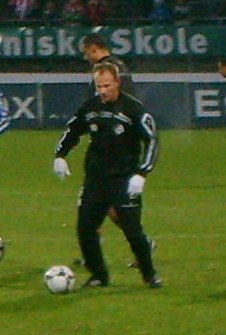

Personal information
- Date of birth: 15 May 1976 (age 50)
- Place of birth: Odense, Denmark
- Positions: Striker; winger

Senior career*
| Years | Team | Apps | (Gls) |
| 1994–1999 | Fjordager | | |
| 2000 | Dalum | | |
| 2000–2006 | OB | 186 | (41) |
| 2006–2007 | Viking | 37 | (6) |
| 2008–2010 | Randers | 91 | (21) |
| 2011–2012 | AGF | 53 | (12) |
| 2013–2014 | FC Vestsjælland | 22 | (1) |

International career^{‡}
| 2003–2006 | Danish League XI | 9 | (1) |
| 2003–2006 | Denmark | 2 | (0) |
- * Club domestic league appearances and goals as of 25 May 2014 ‡ National team caps and goals as of 23 January 2011

Søren Berg (born 15 May 1976) is a Danish retired professional footballer. He has been capped twice for the Denmark national football team.

== Club career ==
Berg was born in Odense, Denmark, and started his career at Danish amateur clubs, before he moved to top-flight club Odense BK in the Danish Superliga in 2000. Playing as either a right winger or striker, he was part of the Odense team that won the 2002 Danish Cup, and he made his debut for the Danish national team in April 2003. After a successful 2005–06 season, where he was called up for his second Danish national team game in March 2006, he attracted the interest of Norwegian team Viking FK. He was spotted in Stavanger by a journalist, where he received a contract offer from the Norwegian club. On 6 June 2006, it was reported that Berg had accepted the contract offer. and the club confirmed the signing three days later.

=== Randers FC ===
However, in the 2007–08 season, in January, Berg decided to move back to Denmark because he liked the Danish play style better than the style in Norway. He signed a three-year binding contract with the Danish SAS liga club Randers FC.

Berg made his first appearance for Randers in the Danish Cup quarter finals where he was in the starting line forming an attack duo with the also newly arrived teammate Marc Nygaard but was forced off the pitch soon after the start whistle due to an injury in his back. However the injury was not serious and Berg was back on the field the next week.

Berg scored his first goal for Randers FC on 19 April 2009. Despite criticism from the media, stating that Berg had not fulfilled the high expectations that was given to him after his transfer to Randers FC, he succeeded in scoring the winning goal against Brondby IF in a 2–1 victory. This result placed Randers FC at sixth place in the Danish Superliga.

=== AGF ===
On 7 December 2010, Berg signed a contract for two years with AGF.

=== FC Vestsjælland ===
In January 2013, Berg signed a 1 1/2-year contract with FC Vestsjælland. In his first season with FCV, the club got promoted to the Danish Superliga.

== Honours ==
OB

- Danish Cup: 2001–02
