= Thomas Lund (footballer) =

Norwegian footballer (born 1970)

Personal information
- Date of birth: 19 November 1970 (age 55)
- Position: Striker

Youth career
- Tertnes
- Hordvik
- Norna-Salhus

Senior career*
| Years | Team | Apps | (Gls) |
| –1987 | Norna-Salhus | | |
| 1988–1993 | Bergen Nord | | |
| 2000–2001 | Åsane | 189 | (123) |
| 2002–2004 | Brann | 30 | (6) |
| 2006 | Åsane | | |
- * Club domestic league appearances and goals

Thomas Lund (born 19 November 1970) is a retired Norwegian football striker.

He started his youth career in the clubs in Åsane borough, Tertnes, Hordvik and Norna-Salhus. He made his senior debut for Norna-Salhus before the club merged with Hordvik to form FK Bergen Nord in 1988. Not an ambitious player, he started a hairdressing saloon together with his wife. Having run his course in Bergen Nord, he was talked into training with Åsane Fotball. He became a decent goalscorer there before breaking through in 1997 with 21 goals in 20 games. After becoming top goalscorer in the 2002 1. divisjon he was finally signed by the city's largest team, SK Brann. He made his first-tier debut at the age of 33 in the 2003 Tippeligaen. In two seasons he scored 6 league goals and 7 cup goals. He retired after becoming 2004 Norwegian Football Cup champion, only to make a brief comeback for Åsane in 2006.
