= Arnaud Monkam =

Cameroonian footballer

Personal information
- Full name: Arnaud Monkam Nguekam
- Date of birth: February 22, 1986 (age 40)
- Place of birth: Douala, Cameroon
- Height: 1.75 m (5 ft 9 in)
- Position: Midfielder

Youth career
- SC Union Brasseries du Cameroun

Senior career*
Years	Team	Apps	(Gls)
2000–2005	Kadji Sports Academy		
2006–2007	SK Brann	1	(0)
2007	→ Løv-Ham (loan)	26	(3)
2008	Løv-Ham	20	(0)
2010–2011	Cotonsport		
2011–2014	US Douala		
2014–2015	AC Léopards		
2016	Bamboutos FC		

International career
2012	Cameroon	1	(0)
- * Club domestic league appearances and goals

Arnaud Monkam Nguekam (born February 22, 1986) is a retired Cameroonian footballer.

== Career ==
=== SK Brann ===
Monkam was set to join Norwegian team SK Brann in January 2006, but after receiving his labour permit, the Norwegian Football Association cancelled his transfer because of their new rules for buying players from other continents.

The Football Association later turned, letting Monkam transfer to Brann because the deal was closed long before the new rules were made. Therefore, Arnaud Monkam joined SK Brann, in February 2006.

Monkam debuted for Brann against Follese in the 1st round of the Norwegian Cup. He's played 3 Norwegian Cup games, 2 UEFA Cup games and 4 Royal League games for Brann. He got his debut in Tippeligaen on November 5, 2006, with seven minutes as a substitute. He was loaned out to Løv-Ham in March 2007. He signed for the 2008 season a permanent contract with Løv-Ham for the season.

== Honours ==
- 2010, 2011, 2012: Elite One champion
- 2011: Cameroonian Cup champion
