= Håvard Sakariassen =

Norwegian footballer (born 1976)

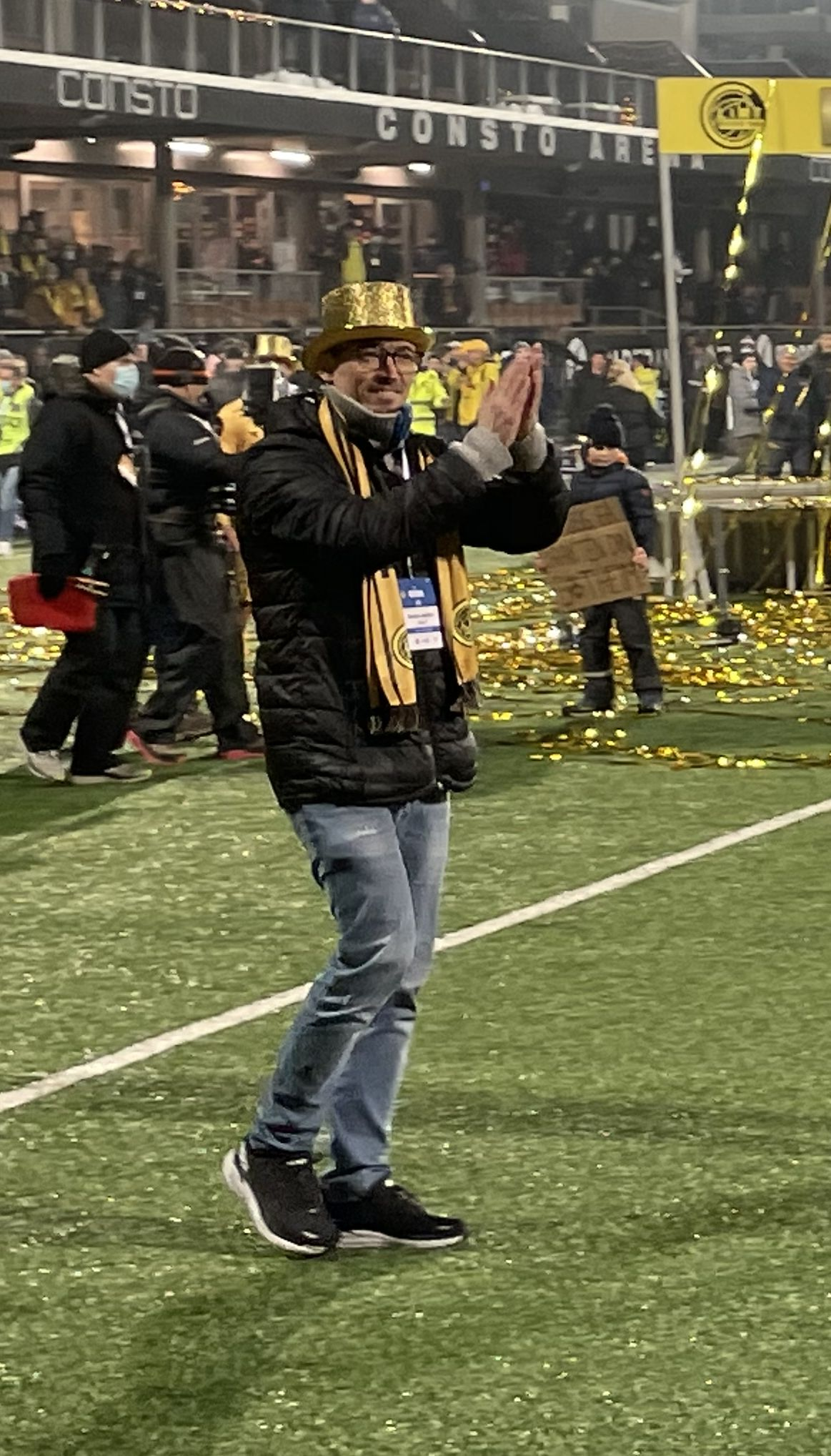

Personal information
- Full name: Håvard Sakariassen
- Date of birth: 28 August 1976 (age 50)
- Place of birth: Bodø, Norway
- Height: 1.91 m (6 ft 3 in)
- Position: Striker

Senior career*
Years	Team	Apps	(Gls)
2003–2004	Moss	59	(20)
2005–2006	Bodø/Glimt	39	(14)
2006–2008	Bryne	48	(18)
2007	→ Aalesund (loan)	8	(0)
2008–2011	Bodø/Glimt	48	(5)
- * Club domestic league appearances and goals as of 2 May 2010

Håvard Sakariassen (born 28 August 1976) is a Norwegian retired football striker he played for FK Bodø/Glimt. He previously played for Aalesunds FK, Bryne FK and Moss FK. He announced his retirement in August 2011.

== Career statistics ==
Season	Club	Division	League		Cup		Total	
Season	Club	Division	Apps	Goals	Apps	Goals	Apps	Goals
2003	Moss	Adeccoligaen	29	5	3	2	32	7
2004	Moss	Adeccoligaen	30	15	1	2	31	17
2005	Bodø/Glimt	Tippeligaen	25	4	4	6	29	10
2006	Bodø/Glimt	Adeccoligaen	14	10	2	4	16	14
2006	Bryne	Adeccoligaen	15	8	0	0	3	2
2007	Bryne	Adeccoligaen	20	6	1	1	21	7
2007	Aalesund	Tippeligaen	8	0	0	0	8	0
2008	Bryne	Adeccoligaen	13	3	0	0	16	3
2008	Bodø/Glimt	Tippeligaen	10	0	1	0	11	0
2009	Bodø/Glimt	Tippeligaen	8	0	3	0	11	0
2010	Bodø/Glimt	Adeccoligaen	20	4	3	3	23	7
2011	Bodø/Glimt	Adeccoligaen	10	1	3	1	13	2
Career Total			202	56	21	19	223	78
