= Erlend Storesund =

Norwegian footballer (born 1985)

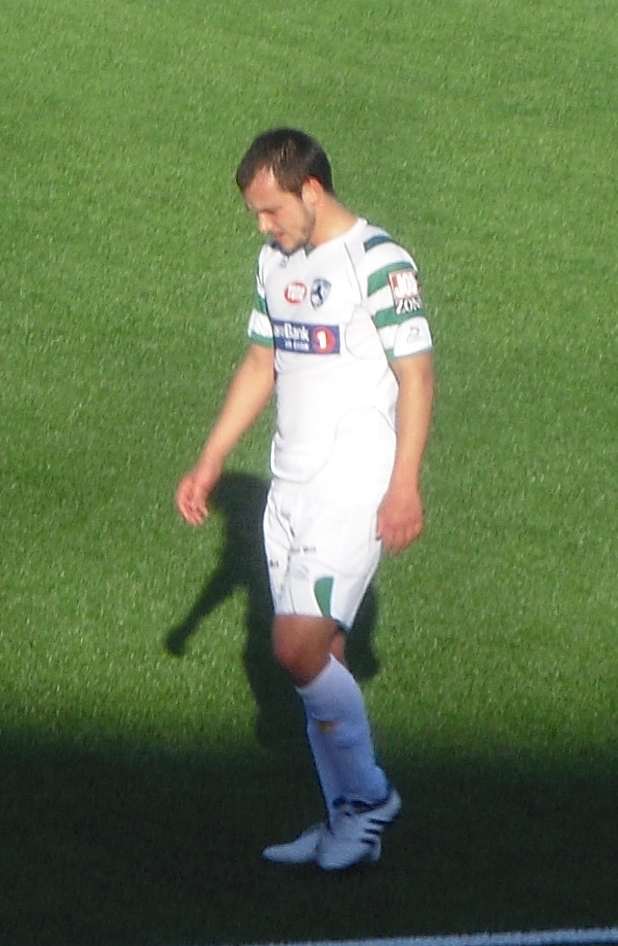

Personal information
- Date of birth: 22 February 1985 (age 41)
- Place of birth: Bergen, Norway
- Height: 1.75 m (5 ft 9 in)
- Position: Left winger

Team information
- Current team: Fyllingsdalen

Youth career
- Brann

Senior career*
Years	Team	Apps	(Gls)
2003–2005	Brann	11	(0)
2005–2007	→ Løv-Ham (loan)	62	(8)
2008–2011	Løv-Ham	60	(6)
2012–	Fyllingsdalen	11	(1)
- * Club domestic league appearances and goals as of 27 April 2008

Erlend Storesund (born 22 February 1985) is a Norwegian footballer. He's a left footed winger, who had played for Brann all his life until he was loaned out to Løv-Ham the summer of 2005.

In January 2006 he signed a new contract with Brann, which was supposed to expire after the 2007 season, but due to Brann having too many players out on loan, it was annulled the summer before it expired, and Storesund signed a contract with Løv-Ham for the rest of the season, a contract that was subsequently prolonged. In 2012 Løv-Ham merged to form FK Fyllingsdalen and Storesund continued to play there.

== Honours ==
=== Norway ===
- Norwegian Cup: 2004
