= Arve Walde =

Norwegian footballer (born 1985)

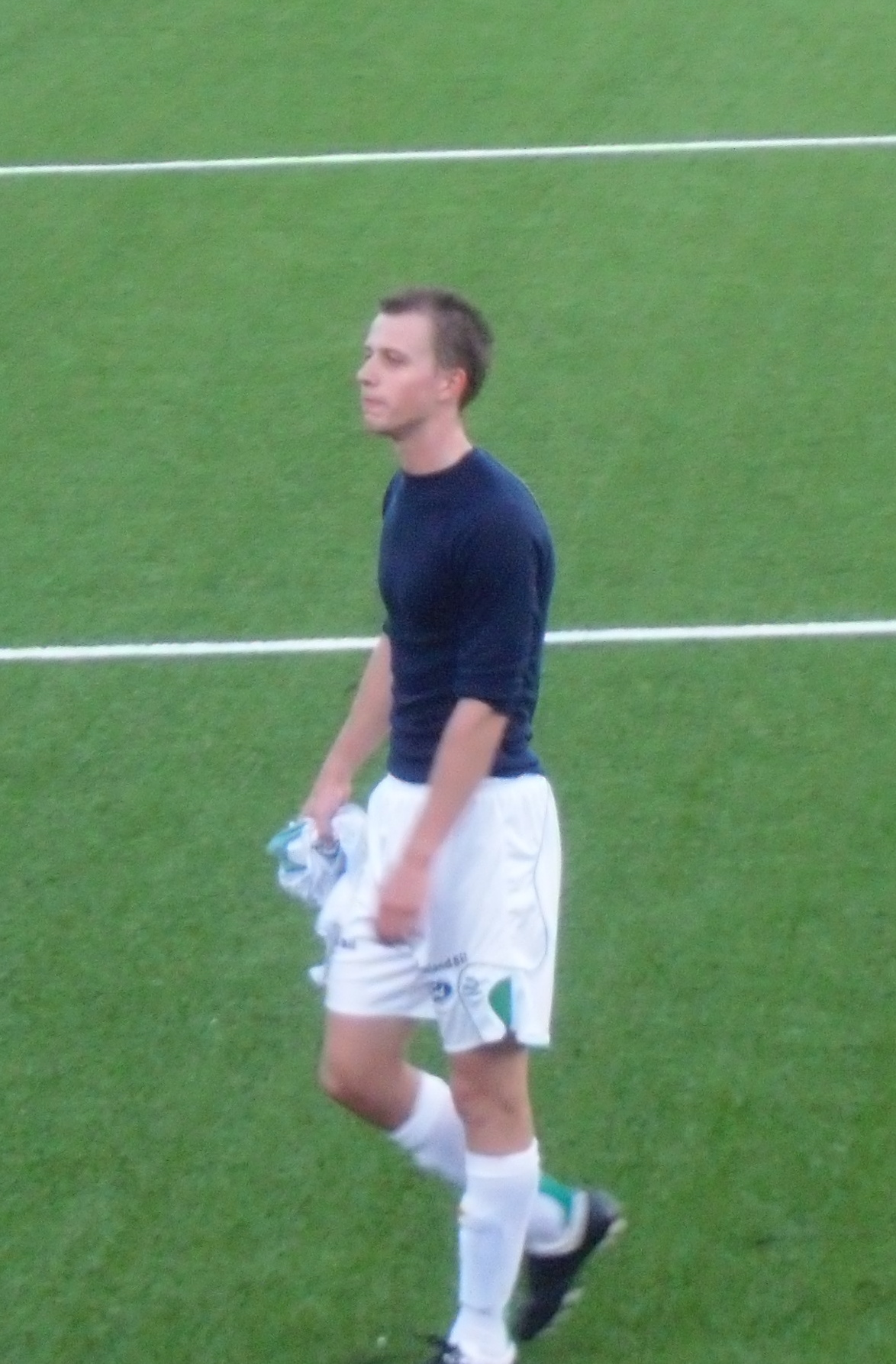

Personal information
- Full name: Arve Grøvan Walde
- Date of birth: 19 May 1985 (age 41)
- Place of birth: Bergen, Norway
- Height: 1.87 m (6 ft 2 in)
- Positions: Left winger; striker

Team information
- Current team: Fyllingsdalen
- Number: 18

Youth career
- Brann

Senior career*
Years	Team	Apps	(Gls)
2003–2005	Brann	21	(1)
2006	→ Løv-Ham (loan)	24	(0)
2007–2011	Løv-Ham	132	(14)
2012–	Fyllingsdalen		

International career
2005	Norway U21	6	(1)
- * Club domestic league appearances and goals as of 24 December 2012

Arve Grøvan Walde (born 19 May 1985) is a footballer playing for Fyllingsdalen. He is a younger brother of former club-colleague Knut Walde.

== Career ==
Walde debuted for Brann's first team in 2003, but apart from a short period in 2004, he never managed to establish himself in the starting line-up. In 2006, Walde was loaned out to the local club Løv-Ham, where he reunited with his brother Knut Walde. The clubs agreed on a one-year loan deal. Walde also signed a two-year contract with Brann before being loaned out to Løv-Ham. Before the 2007 season, however, he signed a contract making him Løv-Ham-player on a permanent basis. In 2012 Løv-Ham merged to form Fyllingsdalen, where Walde continued to play.

== Honors ==
=== Norway ===
- Norwegian football cup: 2004
