= Kristian Ystaas =

Norwegian footballer (born 1982)

Personal information
- Full name: Kristian Ystaas
- Date of birth: 18 February 1982 (age 44)
- Place of birth: Arendal, Norway
- Height: 1.87 m (6 ft 1 1/2 in)
- Position: Striker

Team information
- Current team: Sola

Youth career
- Voss

Senior career*
Years	Team	Apps	(Gls)
1999–2003	Sogndal	89	(16)
2004–2006	Brann	18	(4)
2005	→ Sogndal (loan)	21	(5)
2007–2011	Notodden	20	(3)
2012–	Sola		

International career^{‡}
–2003	Norway U21	25	(6)
- * Club domestic league appearances and goals as of 9 October 2007 ‡ National team caps and goals as of 16 May 2006

Kristian Ystaas (born 18 February 1982) is a strong football striker currently playing for Sola FK. He most notably played for Sogndal and Brann in the Norwegian Premier League.

He had had problems with gaining a regular spot on the Brann team, and in 2005 he was loaned out to his old club Sogndal in the Norwegian First Division where he did not follow up the expectations. Back in Bergen, the competition was hard, and was ranked behind Bengt Sæternes, Robbie Winters, Charlie Miller and Migen Memelli. Ystaas played in the 2006-07 Royal League matches, before he decided to leave the club after his contract expired after the 2006 season. He chose Notodden FK, coached by his former boss in Sogndal, Jan Halvor Halvorsen. Ystaas played 31 matches for Brann, scoring 7 goals.

Ystaas joined Third Division club Sola FK ahead of the 2012 season.

== Honors ==
=== Norway ===
- Norwegian Cup: 2004
