= Yngvar Håkonsen =

Norwegian footballer (born 1978)

Personal information
- Date of birth: 29 January 1978 (age 48)
- Place of birth: Kristiansand, Norway
- Height: 1.86 m (6 ft 1 in)
- Position: Defender

Team information
- Current team: Fløy

Youth career
- Vigør

Senior career*
Years	Team	Apps	(Gls)
1996–1998	Start	26	(0)
1999–2004	Lyn	97	(4)
2005–2006	Gent	19	(0)
2006–2009	Tromsø	29	(3)
2009–2010	Kongsvinger	37	(0)
2011–	Fløy	0	(0)
- * Club domestic league appearances and goals as of 29 January 2010

Yngvar Håkonsen (born 29 January 1978) is a Norwegian footballer playing for Fløy.

Håkonsen has previously played for Tromsø, Lyn, Start and Kongsvinger in Tippeligaen. He has also played for the Belgian club Gent.
