= Martin Knudsen (footballer) =

Norwegian footballer (born 1978)

Personal information
- Full name: Martin Knudsen
- Date of birth: 4 January 1978 (age 48)
- Place of birth: Bergen, Norway
- Height: 1.80 m (5 ft 11 in)
- Position: Midfielder

Youth career
- Midtbygden
- Fyllingen

Senior career*
Years	Team	Apps	(Gls)
1997–1999	Viking	66	(1)
2000–2006	Brann	125	(7)
2007–2009	Tromsø	51	(1)
2010–2011	Staal	?	(?)
2012	Varegg	16	(1)
2013	Staal	?	(?)
2014	Varegg	10	(0)
2015	Nordnes	1	(0)
2015	Djerv	4	(0)

International career^{‡}
1997	Norway U20	1	(0)
1998–1999	Norway U21	6	(0)
- * Club domestic league appearances and goals as of 23 September 2015 ‡ National team caps and goals as of 27 June 2006

Martin Knudsen (born 4 January 1978) is a former footballer from Bergen who played as a midfielder.

He started his senior career in Viking FK.

He came to SK Brann on a free transfer in 2000. Knudsen played over a hundred league matches for the club and played in many different positions on the pitch. He has silver and bronze medals from the Norwegian Tippeligaen and played one of his best matches in his career when Brann won the 2004 cup final against F.C. Lyn Oslo.

At the end of November 2006, Brann was approached by Molde FK, Sandefjord Fotball and Tromsø IL, who all wanted to sign him. Molde later withdrew their offer as they could not afford Knudsen's demanded salary. On 5 December 2006, Knudsen agreed to Tromsø's offer, and played in Tromsø from January 2007. Knudsen choose to leave Tromsø after the 2009 season. He subsequently turned down an offer from newly promoted Norwegian Premier League club Kongsvinger IL as he wanted to live close to his home place, and went on to play for the third division team Staal instead.

== Honours ==
=== Norway ===
- Norwegian cup: 2004
