= Bengt Sæternes =

Norwegian footballer (born 1975)

Personal information
- Full name: Bengt Henning Sæternes
- Date of birth: 1 January 1975 (age 51)
- Place of birth: Egersund, Norway
- Height: 1.87 m (6 ft 2 in)
- Position: Forward

Team information
- Current team: Brøndby IF

Youth career
- Egersund

Senior career*
Years	Team	Apps	(Gls)
1991–1994	Egersund	82	(36)
1994–1996	Eiger	40	(46)
1996–1997	Viking	6	(0)
1997–1998	Odd Grenland	28	(14)
1998–2002	Bodø/Glimt	113	(61)
2002–2004	Club Brugge	40	(13)
2004–2007	Brann	61	(28)
2007–2008	OB	9	(1)
2008–2010	Vålerenga	78	(23)
2010–2011	Viking	21	(4)
Total		478	(226)

International career
1996–1997	Norway U21	3	(0)
2002–2007	Norway	7	(0)

Managerial career
- 2012–2013: UD Vecindario (assistant)
- 2013–2014: Egersund
- 2014–2019: Sandnes Ulf
- 2024–: Brøndby IF
- * Club domestic league appearances and goals

Bengt Sæternes (born 1 January 1975) is a Norwegian former professional footballer who played as a forward from 1991 until 2011.

He began his playing career at local clubs Egersund and Eiger, whilst he had spells at Viking, Odd Grenland, Bodø/Glimt, Club Brugge, Brann, OB, and Vålerenga. Sæternes was capped seven times for Norway.

== Club career ==
Sæternes had short stints in both Viking and Odd Grenland until his career boosted in Bodø/Glimt. He was the club's top scorer in a number of seasons before he was sold to the Belgian First Division club Club Brugge. His stay in Belgium was ruined by multiple injuries, and he decided to return to Norway in the summer of 2004. Despite the general public believed that he would transfer to the champions Rosenborg, Bengt chose Brann instead. He made an instant impact in Bergen by demonstrating great goal scoring abilities clearly proven in the 2004 cup final, when he scored three goals. After a great 2004 season, the 2005 and the beginning of the 2006 season was a disappointment, mainly due to a long lasting injury. Sæternes never managed to copy the success from his first season in Brann. He went on to play both in OB, Vålerenga before returning to Viking.

Ahead of the 2012 season, Viking terminated Sæternes' contract, after only one season at the club.

== International career ==
Sæternes played three matches for Norway U-21 in 1996 and 1997, and was later capped seven times for Norway between 2002 and 2007.

== Coaching career ==
Before the 2012–13 Tercera División, Sæternes joined UD Vecindario as assistant coach on a one-year contract. He rejected offers from Norway in order to "learn everything I can of Spanish football."

== Career statistics ==
Appearances and goals by club, season and competition
Club	Season	League			Cup		Total	
Club	Season	Division	Apps	Goals	Apps	Goals	Apps	Goals
Viking	1996	Tippeligaen	6	0			6	0
Odd Grenland	1997	1. divisjon	24	12			24	12
Bodø/Glimt	1998	Tippeligaen	26	9			26	9
Bodø/Glimt	1999	Tippeligaen	25	16	0	0	25	16
Bodø/Glimt	2000	Tippeligaen	20	13	3	2	23	15
Bodø/Glimt	2001	Tippeligaen	24	11	3	3	27	14
Bodø/Glimt	2002	Tippeligaen	18	12	4	7	22	19
Brann	2004	Tippeligaen	8	5	2	4	10	9
Brann	2005	Tippeligaen	18	9	1	1	19	10
Brann	2006	Tippeligaen	25	9	2	1	27	10
Brann	2007	Tippeligaen	10	5	1	2	11	7
OB	2007–08	Superliga	9	1	0	0	9	1
Vålerenga	2008	Tippeligaen	26	5	6	5	32	10
Vålerenga	2009	Tippeligaen	28	11	5	5	33	16
Vålerenga	2010	Tippeligaen	25	7	2	3	27	10
Viking	2011	Tippeligaen	21	4	3	3	24	7
Career total			313	129	32	36	345	165

== Honours ==
Club Brugge

- Belgian First Division: 2002–03
- Belgian Cup: 2003–04
- Belgian Supercup: 2002, 2003

Brann

- Tippeligaen: 2007
- Norwegian Cup: 2004

Vålerenga

- Norwegian Cup: 2008

Individual

- Kniksen Striker of the Year: 2002
