= List of Norway international footballers with one cap =

The Norway national football team represents Norway in international association football. It is fielded by The Football Association of Norway, NFF, the governing body of football in Norway, and competes as a member of the Union of European Football Associations (UEFA), which encompasses the countries of Europe. Norway competed for the first time on 12 July 1908, in a match the team lost 3–11 against Sweden.

Norway have competed in numerous competitions, and all players who have played in only one match, either as a member of the starting eleven or as a substitute, are listed below. Each player's details include his usual playing position while with the team, the number of caps earned and goals scored in all international matches, and details of the first and most recent matches played in. The names are initially ordered by number of caps (in descending order), then by date of debut, then by alphabetical order. All statistics are correct up to 31 March 2026.

== Key ==
Player
This colour background and the * symbol indicate that the player was active at club level as at the date specified above.

Positions key
Pre-1960s		1960s–	
GK	Goalkeeper		
FB	Full back	DF	Defender
HB	Half back	MF	Midfielder
FW	Forward		

Position
Playing positions are listed according to the tactical formations that were employed at the time. Thus the change in the names of defensive and midfield positions reflects the tactical evolution that occurred from the 1960s onwards.
Caps and goals
Caps and goals comprise those in the FIFA World Cup and UEFA European Championship, their associated qualification matches and international friendly tournaments and matches.

== Players ==
Player	Pos.	Caps	Goals	Appearance		Refs.
Player	Pos.	Caps	Goals	Date	Opponent	Refs.
Arvid Arisholm	FB	1	0	12 July 1908	Sweden	
Minotti Bøhn	HB	1	2	12 July 1908	Sweden	
Wilhelm Brekke	FB	1	0	12 July 1908	Sweden	
Tryggve Gran	HB	1	0	12 July 1908	Sweden	
Paul Hauman	FB	1	0	12 July 1908	Sweden	
Sverre Lie	GK	1	0	12 July 1908	Sweden	
Frithjof Skonnord	HB	1	0	12 July 1908	Sweden	
Sverre Blix	FB	1	0	11 September 1910	Sweden	
Sigurd Brekke	HB	1	0	11 September 1910	Sweden	
Carl Frølich-Hanssen	FW	1	0	11 September 1910	Sweden	
Knut Heyerdahl-Larsen	HB	1	0	11 September 1910	Sweden	
Paul Due	FB	1	0	23 June 1912	Hungary	
Thoralf Grubbe	HB	1	0	23 June 1912	Hungary	
Thorbjørn Damgaard	FB	1	0	3 November 1912	Sweden	
Samuel Knutzen	HB	1	0	3 November 1912	Sweden	
Georg Waitz	FB	1	0	3 November 1912	Sweden	
Alf Andersen	FB	1	0	14 September 1913	Russia	
Georg Andersen	HB	1	0	14 September 1913	Russia	
Frode Bjerkholt	FB	1	0	14 September 1913	Russia	
Johan Hallberg	FB	1	0	14 September 1913	Russia	
Bjarne Hansen	HB	1	0	14 September 1913	Russia	
Johan Lauritzen	FW	1	1	14 September 1913	Russia	
Bjarne Gulbrandsen	FB	1	0	26 October 1913	Sweden	
Olaf Iversen	HB	1	0	25 October 1914	Sweden	
Gustav Edén	FB	1	0	27 June 1915	Sweden	
Peder Henriksen	FB	1	0	19 September 1915	Denmark	
Thorleif Tharaldsen	FB	1	0	19 September 1915	Denmark	
Wilhelm Strand	FB	1	0	25 June 1916	Denmark	
Peder Puck	HB	1	0	19 August 1917	Sweden	
Trygve Smith	HB	1	0	7 October 1917	Denmark	
Erling Gustavsen	HB	1	0	26 May 1918	Sweden	
Olaf Hegnander	HB	1	0	26 May 1918	Sweden	
Einar Nordlie	HB	1	0	26 May 1918	Sweden	
Frantz Magnussen	FB	1	0	12 June 1919	Denmark	
Harald Schønfeldt	HB	1	0	12 June 1919	Denmark	
Alf Lagesen	GK	1	0	26 September 1920	Sweden	
Erland Ellingsen	FW	1	0	23 August 1922	Sweden	
Johan Gaarder	FB	1	0	10 September 1922	Denmark	
Bertel Ulrichsen	FW	1	1	16 September 1923	Sweden	
Nils Berntsen	FB	1	0	15 June 1924	Germany	
Sigmund Frogn	FW	1	0	14 September 1924	Denmark	
Sigurd Eek	FB	1	0	21 September 1924	Sweden	
Harald Halvorsen	FW	1	0	7 June 1925	Finland	
Anker Hansen	FB	1	0	7 June 1925	Finland	
Folke Kirkemo	FB	1	0	7 June 1925	Finland	
Bjarne Olsen	HB	1	0	21 June 1925	Denmark	
Arne Johansen	GK	1	0	23 August 1925	Sweden	
Alf Hansen	FB	1	0	6 June 1926	Finland	
Bredo Wass	HB	1	0	6 June 1926	Finland	
Alf Johansen	HB	1	0	10 October 1926	Poland	
Sverre Pettersen	FB	1	0	10 October 1926	Poland	
Einar Sandberg	HB	1	0	10 October 1926	Poland	
Einar Larsen	FW	1	0	15 June 1927	Finland	
Trygve Løken	FB	1	0	15 June 1927	Finland	
Ingvald Frøysa	GK	1	0	30 October 1927	Denmark	
Robert Danielsen	HB	1	0	23 September 1928	Germany	
Knut Ellingsrud	FB	1	0	23 September 1928	Germany	
Karl Pedersen	HB	1	0	23 September 1928	Germany	
Sverre Fredriksen	HB	1	0	29 September 1929	Sweden	
Erling Lindberg	FB	1	0	29 September 1929	Sweden	
Knut Andersen	FB	1	0	19 June 1930	Switzerland	
Israel Krupp	HB	1	1	19 June 1930	Switzerland	
Fritz Amundsen	FB	1	0	6 July 1930	Sweden	
Alf Nielsen	HB	1	1	2 November 1930	Germany	
Bjarne Larsen	FB	1	0	21 June 1931	Germany	
Leif Børresen	FW	1	1	6 September 1931	Finland	
Petter Ravn	HB	1	0	6 September 1931	Finland	
Ingolf Olsen	FB	1	0	27 September 1931	Sweden	
Arne Riberg	HB	1	0	27 September 1931	Sweden	
William Eriksen	HB	1	0	5 June 1932	Estonia	
Reidar Karlsen	HB	1	0	5 June 1932	Estonia	
Helge Helgesen	FW	1	1	28 May 1933	Wales	
Arne Svendsen	HB	1	0	28 May 1933	Wales	
Thorleif Hartung	HB	1	0	3 September 1933	Finland	
Arne Yven	HB	1	0	3 September 1933	Finland	
Arthur Kvammen	FW	1	1	5 November 1933	Germany	
Leif Eriksen	FB	1	0	31 May 1935	Hungary	
Håkon Askerød	HB	1	0	3 November 1935	Switzerland	
Sverre Kvammen	GK	1	0	3 November 1935	Switzerland	
Kjell Pettersen	HB	1	0	3 November 1935	Switzerland	
Arne Sørensen	HB	1	0	3 November 1935	Switzerland	
Godfred Bysheim	HB	1	0	6 September 1936	Finland	
Hans Andersen	FB	1	0	13 June 1937	Denmark	
Kjell Eeg	HB	1	0	7 November 1937	Irish Free State	
Per Frøistad	FW	1	1	3 September 1939	Finland	
Johannes Stensletten	HB	1	0	3 September 1939	Finland	
Arne Ileby	FW	1	0	17 September 1939	Sweden	
Olav Navestad	FW	1	1	17 September 1939	Sweden	
Bjørn Berger	FB	1	0	9 September 1945	Denmark	
Sverre Zachariassen	FB	1	0	9 September 1945	Denmark	
Per Frantzen	FB	1	0	28 June 1946	Finland	
Fritz Kristoffersen	FW	1	0	20 October 1946	Denmark	
Arne Røisland	FW	1	0	28 June 1947	Sweden	
Alf Svendsrud	FW	1	0	28 June 1947	Sweden	
Odd Fredriksen	HB	1	0	7 September 1947	Finland	
Erling Gripp	FB	1	0	21 September 1947	Denmark	
Øivind Høibak	FB	1	0	21 September 1947	Denmark	
Karsten Johannesen	FB	1	0	5 October 1947	Sweden	
Thor Lunde	FB	1	0	26 May 1948	Netherlands	
Inge Paulsen	HB	1	0	19 September 1948	Sweden	
Odd Andersen	HB	1	0	18 May 1949	England	
Henry Henriksen	FB	1	0	19 June 1949	Yugoslavia	
Knut Sørensen	HB	1	0	19 June 1949	Yugoslavia	
Sverre Olsen	HB	1	0	8 July 1949	Finland	
Arild Andresen	GK	1	0	24 September 1950	Sweden	
Oddvar Kruge	FB	1	0	30 September 1951	Sweden	
Rolf Eriksen	FB	1	0	10 June 1952	Finland	
Knut Andersen	FW	1	0	25 June 1952	Yugoslavia	
Gunnar Eide	FB	1	0	25 June 1952	Yugoslavia	
Dagfinn Nilsen	FB	1	0	25 June 1952	Yugoslavia	
Jan Sagvaag	FW	1	1	25 June 1952	Yugoslavia	
Asbjørn Andersen	FW	1	0	24 June 1953	Saar	
Pål Angell-Hansen	MF	1	1	30 August 1953	Finland	
Bernhard Johansen	HB	1	0	13 September 1953	Denmark	
Knut Brogaard	FB	1	0	4 July 1954	Iceland	
Willy Buer	FW	1	0	4 July 1954	Iceland	
Even Hansen	FB	1	0	4 July 1954	Iceland	
Håkon Kindervåg	HB	1	0	4 July 1954	Iceland	
Anton Løkkeberg	FB	1	0	4 July 1954	Iceland	
John Olsen	HB	1	0	4 July 1954	Iceland	
Odd Pettersen	FB	1	0	4 July 1954	Iceland	
Reidar Sundby	FW	1	1	19 September 1954	Sweden	
Ragnar Berge	FB	1	0	25 May 1955	Republic of Ireland	
Hans Nylund	HB	1	0	28 May 1958	Netherlands	
Jan Ørke	FB	1	0	13 August 1958	East Germany	
Frank Nervik	GK	1	0	13 September 1959	Denmark	
Hans Saksvik	FB	1	0	4 November 1959	Netherlands	
Kåre Bjørnsen	DF	1	0	26 May 1960	Denmark	
Wilhelm Eliassen	FW	1	0	26 May 1960	Denmark	
Jan Nilsen	DF	1	0	9 June 1960	Iceland	
Kåre Aasgaard	GK	1	0	28 August 1960	Finland	
Eldar Hansen	MF	1	1	1 July 1961	Soviet Union	
Anders Svela	DF	1	0	21 June 1962	Sweden	
Odd Oppedal	MF	1	0	26 August 1962	Finland	
Roald Paulsen	FW	1	0	26 August 1962	Finland	
Per Sønstabø	DF	1	0	26 September 1965	Denmark	
Karl Johan Johannessen	MF	1	0	6 November 1968	France	
Kjell Wangen	DF	1	0	13 November 1969	Guatemala	
Bjørn Rime	FB	1	0	20 July 1970	Iceland	
Tor Wæhler	MF	1	0	26 May 1971	Iceland	
Svein Hammerø	MF	1	0	1 November 1972	Netherlands	
Stein Karlsen	FW	1	0	31 October 1973	Belgium	
Egil Solberg	FW	1	0	3 November 1973	Luxembourg	
Børge Josefsen	FB	1	0	29 October 1975	Northern Ireland	
Finn Vådahl	FW	1	0	24 March 1976	Republic of Ireland	
Ole Kristian Olsen	FW	1	0	19 May 1976	Iceland	
Erik Karlsen	MF	1	0	26 May 1977	Sweden	
Rune Hansen	DF	1	0	1 June 1977	Denmark	
Birk Engstrøm	DF	1	0	18 August 1977	Finland	
Steinar Nilssen	MF	1	0	31 May 1979	Republic of Ireland	
Kurt Tunheim	MF	1	0	26 September 1979	West Germany	
Lasse Opseth	MF	1	0	15 June 1982	Denmark	
Steinar Aulie	DF	1	0	13 November 1982	Kuwait	
Hans Deunk	DF	1	0	13 November 1982	Kuwait	
Tonning Hammer	MF	1	0	13 November 1982	Kuwait	
Jarle Ødegaard	DF	1	0	19 May 1983	Denmark	
Jo Bergsvand	MF	1	0	30 June 1983	Poland	
Nick Sandberg	MF	1	0	30 June 1983	Poland	
Ingvar Dalhaug	MF	1	0	29 October 1983	East Germany	
Trond Sirevåg	DF	1	0	20 June 1984	Iceland	
Hans Brandtun	DF	1	0	5 June 1985	Wales	
Per-Mathias Høgmo	MF	1	0	8 November 1986	Switzerland	
Olav Klepp	MF	1	0	6 May 1987	Turkey	
Cato Erstad	MF	1	0	26 May 1987	Bulgaria	
Lars Gaute Bø	GK	1	0	28 October 1987	East Germany	
Glenn Holm	MF	1	0	26 April 1988	Sweden	
Jan Vidar Madsen	DF	1	0	26 April 1988	Sweden	
Tor Pedersen	DF	1	0	4 November 1988	Czechoslovakia	
Leif Rune Salte	DF	1	0	4 November 1988	Czechoslovakia	
Per-Ove Ludvigsen	DF	1	0	6 June 1990	Denmark	
Tor André Grenersen	GK	1	0	7 November 1990	Tunisia	
Ole Bjørn Sundgot	FW	1	0	25 May 1995	Ghana	
Jørn Jamtfall	GK	1	0	18 January 1997	South Korea	
Bjørn Tore Kvarme	DF	1	0	8 October 1997	Colombia	
Bjørn Viljugrein	MF	1	0	8 October 1997	Colombia	
Hai Ngoc Tran	DF	1	0	22 January 1999	Estonia	
Mike Kjølø	DF	1	0	4 February 2000	Sweden	
Tommy Øren	MF	1	0	24 January 2001	South Korea	
Morten Berre	FW	1	0	28 February 2001	Northern Ireland	
Karl Oskar Fjørtoft	MF	1	0	22 January 2004	Sweden	
Rune Buer Johansen	MF	1	0	25 January 2004	Honduras	
Bjørn Dahl	DF	1	0	28 January 2004	Singapore	
Rune Lange	FW	1	0	27 May 2004	Wales	
Knut Borch	GK	1	0	28 January 2005	Jordan	
Stian Ohr	MF	1	0	29 January 2006	United States	
Steinar Pedersen	DF	1	0	29 January 2006	United States	
Tomasz Sokolowski	MF	1	0	29 January 2006	United States	
Atle Roar Håland	DF	1	0	1 March 2006	Senegal	
Trond Olsen	MF	1	0	19 November 2008	Ukraine	
Morten Skjønsberg	DF	1	0	19 November 2008	Ukraine	
Morten Fevang	DF	1	0	10 June 2009	Netherlands	
Thomas Sørum	FW	1	0	15 January 2012	Denmark	
Thomas Drage *	MF	1	0	18 January 2012	Thailand	
Mushaga Bakenga *	FW	1	0	18 January 2014	Poland	
Kenneth Høie	GK	1	0	18 January 2014	Poland	
Stian Ringstad *	DF	1	0	27 May 2014	France	
Fredrik Brustad	FW	1	0	27 August 2014	United Arab Emirates	
Thomas Grøgaard *	DF	1	0	27 August 2014	United Arab Emirates	
Niklas Gunnarsson *	DF	1	0	29 May 2016	Portugal	
Pål Alexander Kirkevold *	FW	1	0	11 November 2017	Macedonia	
Kristoffer Askildsen *	MF	1	0	18 November 2020	Austria	
Per Kristian Bråtveit *	GK	1	0	18 November 2020	Austria	
Håkon Evjen *	MF	1	0	18 November 2020	Austria	
Daniel Granli *	DF	1	0	18 November 2020	Austria	
Sondre Tronstad *	MF	1	0	18 November 2020	Austria	
Andreas Vindheim *	DF	1	0	18 November 2020	Austria	
Tokmac Nguen *	MF	1	0	24 March 2021	Gibraltar	
Dennis Johnsen *	MF	1	0	11 October 2021	Montenegro	
Thomas Lehne Olsen *	FW	1	0	16 November 2021	Netherlands	
Kristoffer Velde *	MF	1	0	20 June 2023	Cyprus	
Brice Wembangomo *	DF	1	0	20 June 2023	Cyprus	
Osame Sahraoui *	FW	1	0	7 September 2023	Jordan	
Markus Solbakken *	MF	1	0	7 September 2023	Jordan	
Mathias Dyngeland *	GK	1	0	16 November 2023	Faroe Islands	
Sindre Walle Egeli *	FW	1	0	6 September 2024	Kazakhstan	
Colin Rösler *	DF	1	0	17 November 2024	Kazakhstan	
Kristian Arnstad *	MF	1	0	14 October 2025	New Zealand	
Eivind Helland *	DF	1	0	14 October 2025	New Zealand	
Sverre Nypan *	MF	1	0	14 October 2025	New Zealand	
Sebastian Sebulonsen *	DF	1	0	14 October 2025	New Zealand	
Odin Bjørtuft *	DF	1	0	31 March 2026	Switzerland	

== See also ==
- List of Norway international footballers, covering players with twenty-five or more caps
- List of Norway international footballers (10–24 caps)
- List of Norway international footballers (2–9 caps)
