= 1975 Norwegian Football Cup =

Norgesmesterskapet i fotball for menn 1975

Tournament details
- Country: Norway
- Teams: 128 (main competition)

Final positions
- Champions: Bodø/Glimt (1st title)
- Runners-up: Vard

Norwegian Cup Winners 1975: Bodø/Glimt
Jon Abrahamsen, Tor Eriksen, Einar Kolstad, Oddbjørn Kristoffersen, Trond Tidemann, Arild Olsen, Harald Johan "Dutte" Berg, Jakob Klette, Ove Andreassen, Arne Hanssen, Terje Mørkved, Sturla Solhaug and Trygve Nygård, Truls Klausen.

The 1975 Norwegian Football Cup was the 70th edition of the Norwegian annual knockout football tournament. The Cup was won by Bodø/Glimt after beating Vard in the cup final with the score 2–0. This was Bodø/Glimt's first Norwegian Cup title.

== First round ==
Team 1	Score	Team 2
28 May 1975
Odd	0–1	Tjølling
29 May 1975
Aksla	0–10	Molde
Arna	1–3	Varegg
Askim	3–2 (a.e.t.)	Aurskog
Baune	1–0	Florvåg
Bodø/Glimt	3–0	Kabelvåg
Brann	1–0	Bjarg
Brumunddal	3–0	Faaberg
Dale Fjaler	1–4	Eid
Djerv 1919	1–1 (a.e.t.)	Haugar
Eidsvold Turn	4–0	Øvrevoll
Eik	2–0	Larvik Turn
Falken	0–1	Nessegutten
Fana	0–2	Ny-Krohnborg
Fauske/Sprint	0–2	Mo
Folldal	0–2 (a.e.t.)	Tynset
Fram (Larvik)	1–0	Brevik
Grorud	3–0	Ull/Kisa
Gvarv	0–4	Pors
HamKam	4–0	Ottestad
Henning	3–5	Stjørdals/Blink
Hof	0–2	Grue
Hødd	1–0	Sykkylven
Jarl	1–4	Viking
Jevnaker	1–2	Gjøvik-Lyn
Kirkenes	2–1 (a.e.t.)	Norild
Kongsvinger	3–2 (a.e.t.)	Ørje
Kopervik	2–3 (a.e.t.)	Vard
Kristiansund	0–3	Clausenengen
Kvinesdal	1–2	Vigrestad
Landsås	2–0	Mjølner
Leksvik	1–2	Strindheim
Lillestrøm	2–1	Røa
Lisleby	1–0	Borgen Sarpsborg
Løkken	1–4	Rosenborg
Mjøndalen	6–0	Teie
Moss	1–0 (a.e.t.)	Kvik (Halden)
Namsos	1–0	Steinkjer
Navestad	3–2	Fredrikstad
Neset	2–1	Nidelv
Nybergsund	4–2	Otta
Raufoss	1–2	Vardal
Sarpsborg	5–2	Greåker
Skarbøvik	2–0	Bergsøy
Sogndal	0–1	Jotun
Sola	0–1	Bryne
Stabæk	0–4	Lyn
Stavanger	2–1 (a.e.t.)	Brodd
Stord	2–1 (a.e.t.)	Odda
Strømmen	2–4	Frigg
Strømsgodset	5–1	Oppsal
Tistedalen	0–3	Østsiden
Tromsø	2–0	Stein
Træff	0–1	Aalesund
Urædd	2–0	Drafn
Vidar	3–2	Ulf
Vigør	0–2	Start
Vikersund	0–1	Skeid
Voss	0–3	Os
Vålerengen	1–0	Speed
Ørn	3–1	Skiold
Ørsta	2–3	Langevåg
Åndalsnes	0–1	Sunndal
Åssiden	0–1	Kongsberg
Replay: 5 June 1975
Haugar	2–1	Djerv 1919

== Second round ==
Team 1	Score	Team 2
11 June 1975
Askim	1–3	Moss
Bryne	2–1	Stavanger
Eid	0–3	Aalesund
Frigg	1–1 (a.e.t.)	Ørn
Gjøvik-Lyn	0–2	Lillestrøm
Grorud	2–1 (a.e.t.)	Sarpsborg
Grue	5–2	Eidsvold Turn
Jotun	0–3	Brann
Kongsberg	1–3	Vålerengen
Kongsvinger	0–1	HamKam
Landsås	1–7	Bodø/Glimt
Langevåg	1–3	Hødd
Lisleby	2–1	Eik
Mo	3–0	Namsos
Molde	5–0	Skarbøvik
Nessegutten	0–2	Neset
Nybergsund	0–4	Brumunddal
Os	4–2	Ny-Krohnborg
Pors	3–2	Lyn
Skeid	2–2 (a.e.t.)	Navestad
Start	2–0	Urædd
Strindheim	1–0	Stjørdals/Blink
Sunndal	0–1	Clausenengen
Tjølling	1–2	Strømsgodset
Tromsø	3–1	Kirkenes
Tynset	0–3	Rosenborg
Vard	7–1	Stord
Vardal	3–4	Mjøndalen
Varegg	3–1	Baune
Vigrestad	1–1 (a.e.t.)	Haugar
Viking	3–0	Vidar
Østsiden	3–1	Fram (Larvik)
Replay: 18 June 1975
Haugar	2–1	Vigrestad
Navestad	1–3	Skeid
Ørn	2–0	Frigg

== Third round ==
Team 1	Score	Team 2
25 June 1975
Vålerengen	0–0 (a.e.t.)	Østsiden
Bryne	0–0 (a.e.t.)	Start
Clausenengen	3–0	Hødd
Bodø/Glimt	4–0	Tromsø
Os	3–7 (a.e.t.)	Vard
Lillestrøm	3–0	Pors
HamKam	1–0	Grue
Aalesund	1–0	Molde
26 June 1975
Haugar	0–3	Viking
Brann	1–0	Varegg
Rosenborg	5–1	Neset
1 July 1975
Moss	2–0	Ørn
2 July 1975
Mjøndalen	5–0	Grorud
3 July 1975
Mo	2–0	Strindheim
Brumunddal	1–2 (a.e.t.)	Skeid
Strømsgodset	1–3	Lisleby
Replay: 2 July 1975
Østsiden	1–2	Vålerengen
Replay: 11 July 1975
Start	2–1 (a.e.t.)	Bryne

== Fourth round ==
Team 1	Score	Team 2
17 August 1975
Vard	2–1	Brann
Lillestrøm	1–2	Moss
HamKam	3–2	Vålerengen
Skeid	1–1 (a.e.t.)	Bodø/Glimt
Viking	5–0	Clausenengen
Lisleby	0–1	Mjøndalen
Mo	0–1	Rosenborg
Start	3–1	Aalesund
Replay: 21 August 1975
Bodø/Glimt	3–1	Skeid

== Quarter-finals ==
7 September 1975

Bodø/Glimt	2–1	Viking
A. Hansen 33'; Klette 36'		Sundgot 63'

Aspmyra Stadion, Bodø
Attendance: 12,033
Referee: Ivar Fredriksen

7 September 1975

Moss	0–2	Vard
		Økland 24'; Reine 38'

Melløs Stadion, Moss
Attendance: 6,700
Referee: Rolf Haugen

7 September 1975

Start	3–2	HamKam
T. Pedersen 5'; Birkeland 24'; Ommundsen 80'		Jacobsen 14'; Stensrud 70'

Kristiansand Stadion, Kristiansand
Attendance: 6,877
Referee: Kaare Lindboe

7 September 1975

Rosenborg	2–1	Mjøndalen
Iversen 37'; Rime 75'		Solberg 20'

Lerkendal Stadion, Trondheim
Attendance: 9,900
Referee: Odd Johannessen

== Semi-finals ==
8 October 1975

Bodø/Glimt	1–0	Start
Solhaug 61'

Aspmyra Stadion, Bodø
Attendance: 8,940
Referee: Rolf Nyhus

8 October 1975

Vard	4–2	Rosenborg
Hammerø 15', 42'; Risanger 70'; Thunshelle 74'		Rime 14'; J. Hansen 62'

Haugesund Stadion, Haugesund
Attendance: 12,000
Referee: Egil Bergstad

== Final ==
26 October 1975
13:15 CET (UTC+1)

Bodø/Glimt	2–0	Vard
Solhaug 70'; Hanssen 88'	Report

Ullevaal Stadion, Oslo
Attendance: 24,778
Referee: Kaare Lindboe (Vidar)

This was the first time a team from Northern Norway played in (and won) a cup final. Both teams played in the second division at the time.
