= Ålgård FK =

Norwegian football club

Ålgård
- Full name: Ålgård Fotballklubb
- Founded: 1915
- Ground: Ålgård stadion, Ålgård, Norway
- Capacity: 3,000
- Chairman: Tor Eivind Moss
- Manager: Geir Midtsian
- League: Second Division
- 2012: Second Division/ 3, 6th
Home colours	Away colours

Ålgård Fotballklubb is a men's football club located in Ålgård, Norway that was founded in 1915. Ålgård played in Hovedserien, then the highest division in Norway, for several years after World War II. The club has been playing mainly at the third tier level, and was last promoted to 2. divisjon in 2002.

In Rogaland, Ålgård has one of the largest groups of participants in the sport of football in the clubs and has many teams in the youth league. The available talent keeps the club in 2. divisjon. When Bryne FK was promoted to Eliteserien in 1975, many players were transferred to the club in Jæren. Bryne is only 16 km from Ålgård. Players like Birk Engstrøm, Kåre Sivertsen, Sverre Kristian Vaule, Rune Medalen, and Jørgen Rangnes have played for Bryne in Eliteserien. Engstrøm earned a cap for Norway.

The last players to be transferred to the larger clubs, are Marius Helle (Bryne), Edwin Kjeldner (FC Lyn Oslo) and Robert Tveit (Sandnes Ulf). Women players such as Sissel Grude and Dagny Mellgren have transferred out of the area to Klepp IL. Mellgren scored team Norway's winning goal in the finals of the 2000 Summer Olympics.

== History ==
It was long presumed that the club was founded on 30 March 1925; its 50th anniversary in 1975 was celebrated. It was on a trophy cup after the celebration was completed that the inscription: "ÅFK 1915" was found. The 1925 date was when the club was reformed in 1925.

=== The golden age ===
Ålgård FK joined Rogaland Fotballkrets in 1928, and finished in the final of the kretsmesterskapet (KM, "area championship") against Jarl, losing 5–2. In 1936 they won against EIK 2–1 in the qualification at Sandnes Idrettspark and were promoted to class A. In the 1938/39 season, the Ålgård reputation grew in Norgesserien and they were leading after the matches in the autumn. In the last match of the season, Ålgård lost the championship to SIF 1–0. Ålgård made their best effort in the cup ever in 1939, but finally lost against Drafn in Drammen in the 4th round.

In the 1930s, Ravn Tollefsen moved from SIF, to Ålgård to work as a police officer, where he had played for "kretslaget" (a local team made of players without club association). He maintained discipline in the team using his skills as a police officer. Those that acted badly previous to a game would be benched. Ålgård attracted players from Figgjo and had strong support from DFU which was a dominating company in the region. A player move to Ålgård could count on a DFU job in one of its factories. 1945 to 1950 are regarded as the golden age of Ålgård. The culmination came in 1948 when Sportsmanden ranked Ålgård as the seventh best club of Norway after a strong run in Hovedserien:

The divisions great surprise was surely Ålgård, the club from Rogaland. Never have so few done so much – abusing Churchills famous words. It's a known fact that Ålgård only can rely on 15–20 active players. We first doubted Ålgårds right to be in Hovedserien, but were later forced to revise our view. Ålgård has now earned respect among the other clubs in Hovedserien, most of the teams arrive Ålgård with a bad feeling. You have to give Ålgård acknowledgement for having Hovedseriens best fighting spirit, and their impressing results speaks for themselves. What else can you say about victories like 3–1 against Brann in Bergen, two victories against Viking and 2–1 against Skeid. Simply amazing. We can not see any reason that the club should be relegated this season. Sportsmanden

In 1949, DFU construction was underway so all their home matches were played at Sandnes. The new venue was opened in September 1950 with an inaugural match against Mjøndalen attracting 2000 attendants.

=== Decline ===
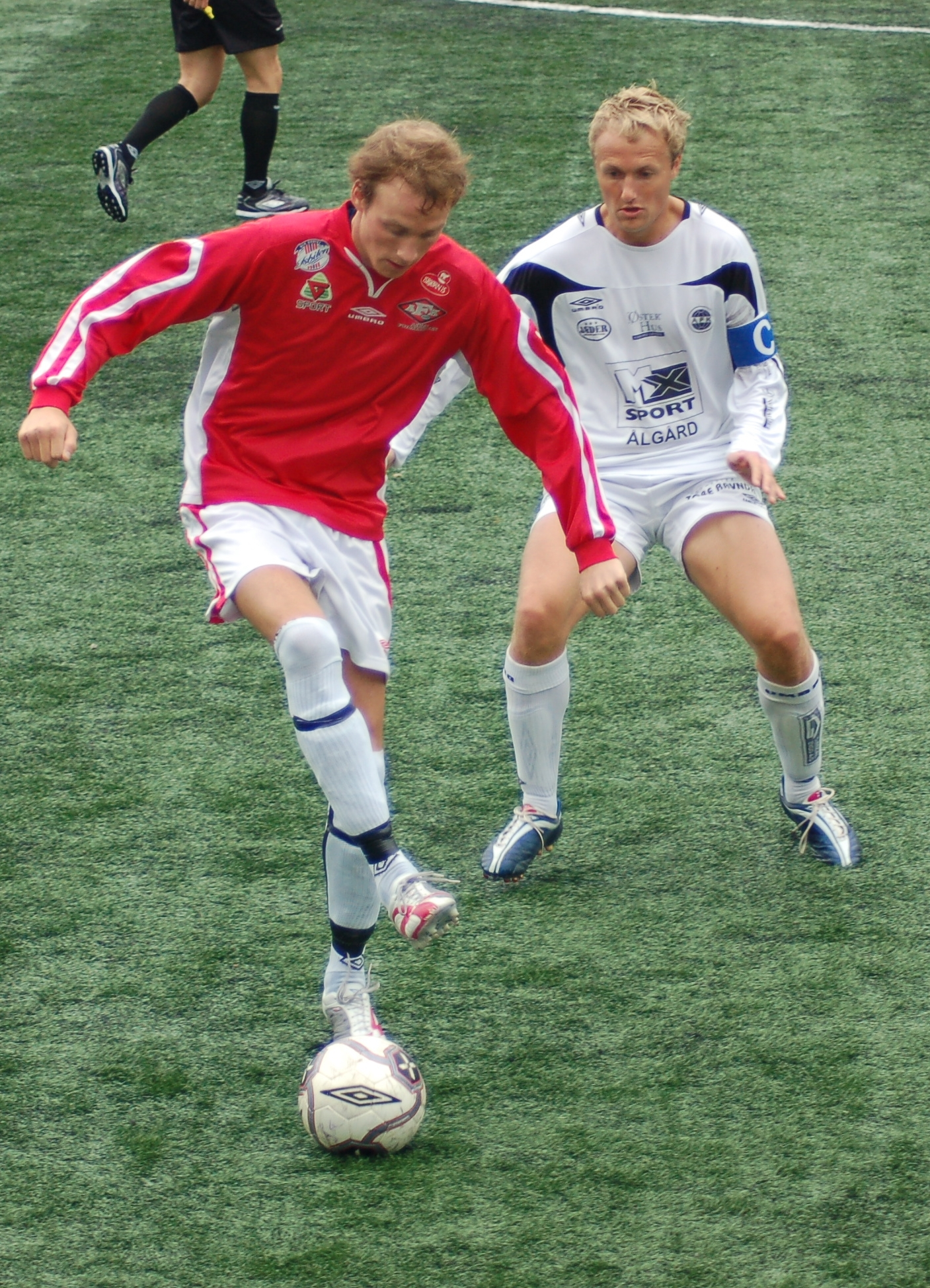
Ålgårds captain, Oddbjørn Sivertsen (white jersey), with an Askøy–player, in the match in 2. divisjon at Kleppestø 4 August 2007. Photo: Rune Sattler

The club celebrated its 25th anniversary in 1950. Ålgårds would attract Talent Alf Ravndal on its rooster but many players on the team remained from its previous seasons. Gunnar Stensland and Sigurd Ravndal, two decent players, moved to Stavanger and joined Viking. Sverre Fredriksen became the coach, but this was not enough, the club did not secure their place in Hovedserien and was relegated, home matches were played in Sandnes. Ålgård reached the qualification for Hovedserien the next year, but Gjøvik-Lyn, Årstad and Snøgg were too strong. But Ålgård still attracted 2000 attendants against Årstad in Haugesund, even though Årstad is from Bergen.

Ålgård again reached the 3rd of the cup in 1951 and was again drawn against Viking. The teams had played each other ten times after the war before this match. Ålgård had won five, Viking four and one draw. The match attracted 4500 attendants. After a 0–0 draw, a rematch was played in Stavanger with 6000 attendees.

Before the season of 1951/52, 1st division became "Landsdelsserien". Ålgård ended this season as the last one, winning the league of Rogaland. Once again the club had reached the qualification. This time was Varegg from Bergen opponents in Haugesund. The match ended 2–2 in front of 2000 spectators. The decision finally came after extra time in the rematch, and Varegg could celebrate after winning 2–1.

Ålgård lost their first home match at the new ground in the autumn of 1952, two years after the ground was opened, when Djerv 1919 won 2–1. ÅFK got nine out of ten points in the spring of 1953, but the team had been too weak in the autumn and was not able to win the league this year. The first of the "great" players from the end of the 1940s had retired, and new players were added. 1952/53 was a good year for the team, the last time the team had scored as many goals was in 1947, but the economy was bad. The team was going to put this straight in the cup, and after an easy win against Klepp, the team was drawn against Donn in Kristiansand. But Ålgård surprisingly lost, and the club missed an income of several thousands kroner.

The next season was disappointing, but 1955 was considerably better. The team reached the 3rd round of the cup and SK Brann visited Ålgård. But Ålgård was unable to repeat the achievement from 1946 and lost 6–2. The club was relegated from Landsdelsserien in the spring of 1955 but was back in 1957. But the season of 1957/58 became the last one in Landsdelsserien. After the league system was remade in 1961, Ålgård has never been higher than the third highest division. 1958 is remembered for the 1st round cup match against Viking, where a controversial decision by the referee, in the end, gave Viking a 3–2 victory after extra time. Jørgen Madland, the Ålgård goalkeeper, turned while he had the ball in his hands, and the referee decided that the ball had crossed the goal line. The referee had to be protected as he went to the dressing room after the match, as angry Ålgård players meant that the ball could not have crossed the line.

1957/58 became Ålgårds weakest season until then, and the club did not qualify for the cup for the first time in 1959. Ålgårds under-19s team won KM in 1956, but many of these players left the club or could not strengthen the team.

=== 4th division ===
In the beginning of the 1960s, ÅFK was struggling in the 4th division. But even though their results were poor, many youths made the team, which would make a positive impact. In 1964 the tide changed, and players who played many games earlier, lifted Ålgård to a great season. Buøy IL became to strong in the qualification in the end, but the team only lost one game in the league. 1964 was the best season in many years, since other teams in the club also had a good season.

The international footballer Reidar Kvammen was appointed coach the next year aside Alf Ravndal. The results did not change significantly from the earlier years in the beginning of the 60s, but the club won KM in under-19s and under-16s. The club had many decent talents, but the club was not able support them. Marvin Skjæveland was one of the most promising players, but he left ÅFK for Ulf.

The club was promoted to 3rd division in 1966 after nine consecutive seasons in 4th division. It was no surprise, as Rogalands Avis expressed:

This year Ålgård, who was relegated to 4th division in 1958, has a very good team. It's a balanced and strong team in all positions. In defence all players have good heading and tackling ability, and Alf Egil Jensen is a quality goalkeeper. The runners Kåre Lima, Torjus Sivertsen, and Johnny Engstrøm always make things happen in the midfield. It's been a long time since Ålgård had such a good team. Rogalands Avis

The first ever Ålgård-player got a cap for a Norwegian national youth team when Birk Engstrøm appeared in a Nordic tournament in Finland. He transferred to Bryne later the same year, which caused reactions among the elder members of the club.

The club had great expectations for playing in the 3rd division in 1967, especially after Vålerenga was beaten with their best players at Ålgård in a friendly match before the season started. But the season brought loss upon loss, and the club dived straight back to 4th division.

=== A new era ===
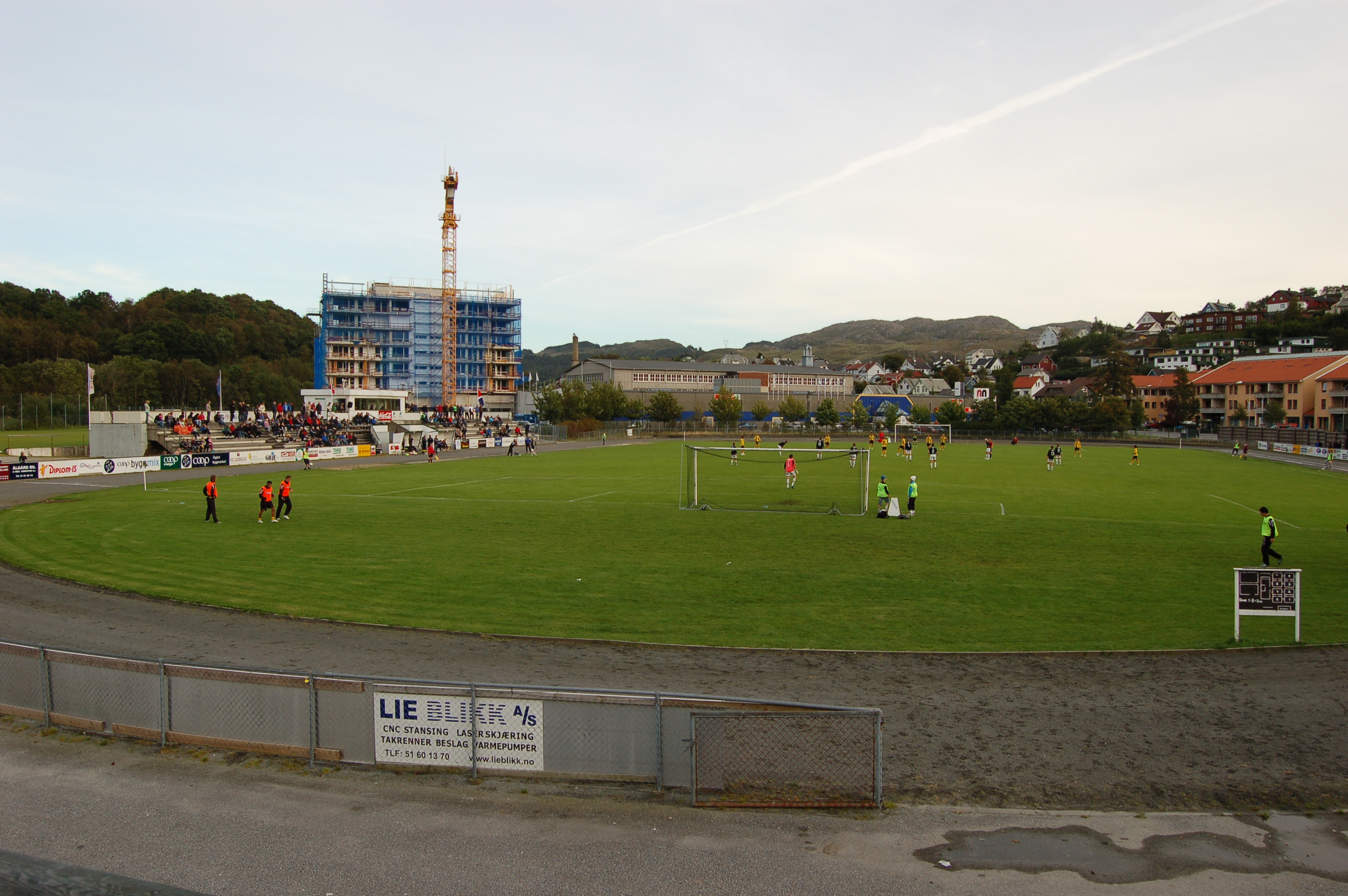
Ålgård stadion: Start 2 is taking kick off after Gunnar Valsson scored for Ålgård 4 September 2007. Photo: Rune Sattler

1969 became an important year by two reasons. The new pitch was finished at Ålgård stadion, and November brought changes in the club. Young inexperienced leaders took almost total control over the general assembly and got the most important positions in the club. A new era started with a new generation leaders whom introduced objectives. Elderly ÅFK-members were disappointed and expected everything to go from bad to worse. The club was not promoted this year, but the club was in motion. The new leaders made the foundations for growth both in the economy and on the pitch, in quality and quantity, which gave results in the 70s and which made the foundation for today's club. The club hired a manager full-time in 1970, and the club was promoted to 3rd division again.

ÅFK avoided relegation in 1971 and 1972, but the club struggled. The clubhouse was built in 1972 after many years of planning and was opened 21 March 1973. In 1973 women were given voting rights in the club, and the club had their first female officials.

Ålgård was relegated in 1972, and was almost promoted the next year. It got especially heated when Djerv 1919 visited Ålgård. Djerv was up by 2–0 with only a couple of minutes to go, but the match ended by a 3–2 win for Ålgård. The players from Haugesund attacked the referee after the match, and the local police officer had to restore order. Several fines were given after the match. In the end Djerv 1919 won the promotion.

The next year became victorious when the club finally promoted after qualification against Odda and Flekkefjord, the same year the club celebrated their 50th anniversary. The team could not meet the expectations the following year, but was back in 3rd division only one year later. The club had an excellent youth team with players which would make an impact on the club in the years to come, like Peder Skårland, Gaute Engstrøm and Kåre Sivertsen. In addition, Sverre Kristian Vaule made the team.

The club avoided relegation with Trond Tengesdal as manager. Before Tengesdal took charge, the club had a committee which picked the team for matches. This committee usually consisted of three persons. With Tengesdal this committee was removed, and the manager picked the team himself. The club got its second national player when Lars Hovland made his debut at Norway's Under-16.

1979 was the last season where 3rd division had a league with only teams from Rogaland. Only the top five teams would qualify for the following years 3rd division. But Ålgård made a fine 2nd place which was far better than expected.

=== 1980s ===
Sivertsen transferred to Bryne in 1980, and the team was struggling before the summer break. ÅFK was the favorite for relegation, but Ålgård finally got their first home win in the end of August with 6–0 against Sandviken. The club ended at 6th place in the end of the season.

1981 brought a fine cup season with 1–0 against Ulf. The team had reached 2nd round for the first time in 13 years. Extra time divided Ålgård and Viking after Ålgård took the lead at Ålgård stadion. Viking won 3–2 after extra time. Gaute Engstrøm transferred to Bryne in the summer, which caused concern in the club, while Sivertsen returned injured from Bryne. Ålgård had in 1981 for the first time a team for girls, a youth team, whom won their division and Vidar Cup.

Again a slow start made Ålgård struggling in 1983, and in the summer the board chose to get a new manager to the club. The struggle for continued play in the 3rd division continued to the last game, but Ålgård was relegated. The team improved the next season and lost only one game, home against Figgjo IL. Figgjo won 3–1, led by Bjarne Berntsen. Ålgård finished 2nd behind Figgjo as they drew more than Figgjo.

1985 became one of the worst seasons in ÅFKs history. The team did not win a single match from 11 May to 23 August. In the end, the team reached 9th place, only three goals ahead of Hovsherad who were relegated to 5th division. The club lost several players before the season of 1986, but Jan Erik Aunevik was back from military service and young promising Rune Medalen was promoted to the senior squad. Ålgård won 4th division by a ten points gap to Sola FK og won the regional championship through defeating Åkra 1–0 at Karmøy and 2–2 at home.

In five years the club had doubled its activities and had 28 teams which played 709 matches in 1988. The "Match of the Century" this year away against Figgjo drew a lot of attention, a match ÅFK surprisingly won 2–1. Figgjo later got their revenge at Ålgård stadion by a late goal. Ålgård became 6th in their first season in 3rd division. 1989 became ÅFKs best season in the 80s. Among the new players were Nils Ove Hellvik and Jørgen Rangnes. The team used three goalkeepers as their first choice in 1989, first Roger Årdal from Hana, then Øyvind Bjelland from Oltedal and finally U-19s Einar Fjeldheim. Ålgård ended in 3rd place.

=== 2nd division ===
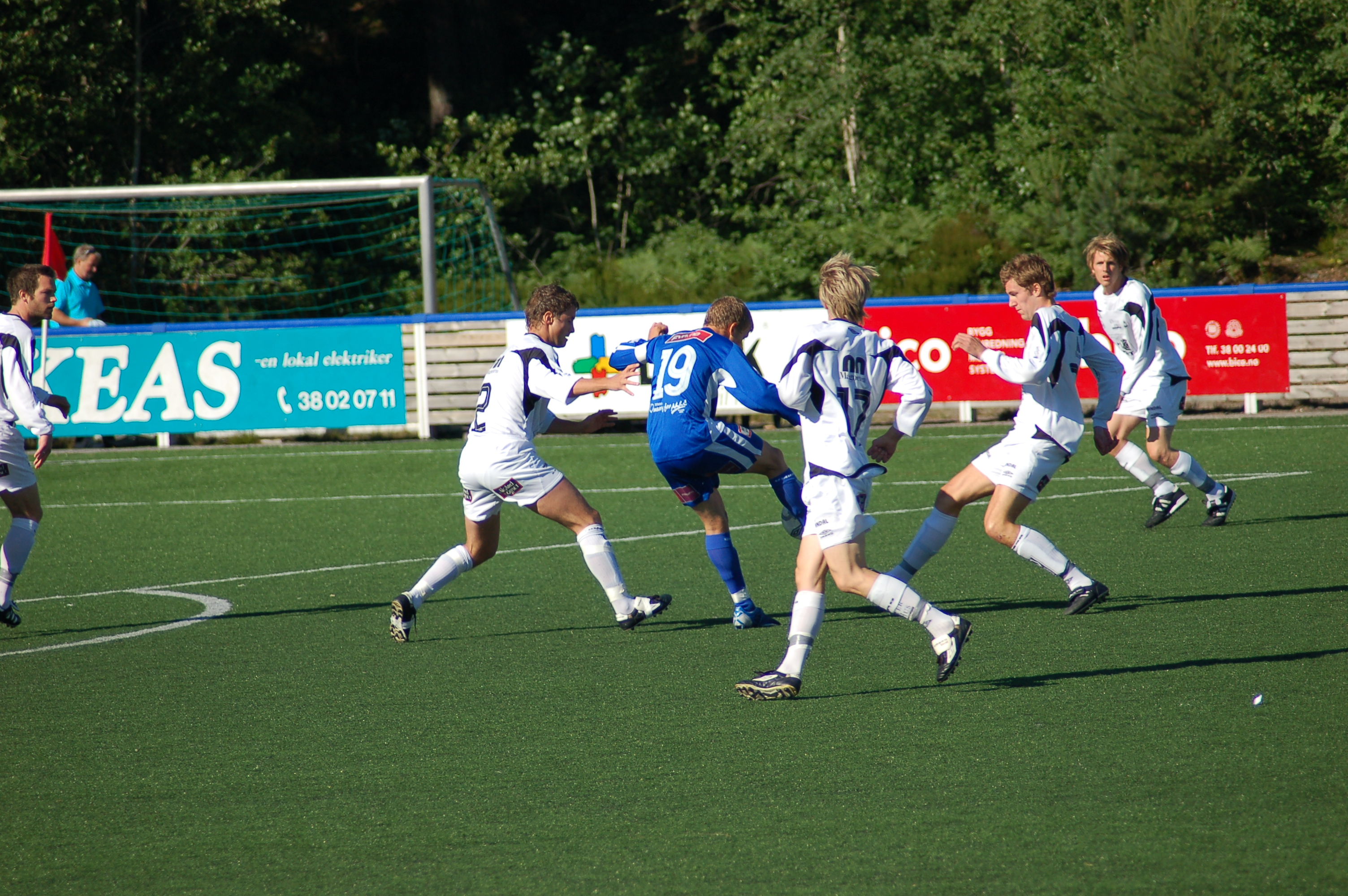
Ålgård in white shirts away against Fløy in June 2007. Photo: Rune Sattler

The club remained at the 3rd level of Norwegian football from 1988 through twelve consecutive seasons before the club ended last in 1999. Ålgård lost many players to other teams in the 90s, Rune Medalen (Viking), Jørgen Rangnes (Bryne), Pål Endre Oftedal (Bryne), Tord Oftedal (Bryne), Arne Eigil Aksnes (Bryne), Odd Arne Tjåland (Bryne) and Knut Terje Stava (Sandnes) among others. But the team won 3rd division in their first season, became regional champions, but lost qualification matches against FK Jerv and Sandnes Ulf. Ålgård was promoted after defeating Vaulen IL in 2002, 6–2 at home and 2–2 away in Stavanger. Following the promotion, the club has many times struggled against relegation but has so far secured their place in 2nd division.

Helge Aune got a bad start in the season of 2005. After playing half the games, Ålgård only had seven points and needed badly a win against local rival EIK. Ålgård got former ÅFK-player Espen Sola on loan from Bryne, and Kim Cassim made a comeback from the reserve team. The club needed a win to have a chance of remaining in 2nd division, but was trashed 4–0 in Egersund. But Ålgård got ten points in the next four games and ended in 6th place at 35 points. Ålgård was the best club of the division in the autumn, while EIK was relegated to 3rd division.

Egil Svendsen became new manager in 2006, and the season started like the previous ended, ÅFK made a good start. The team stayed for a while at second place, but ended in a new 6th place. They claimed 38 points, best result since 1994. Striker Marius Helle transferred to Bryne halfway through the season and was replaced by Geir Tharaldsen from SK Nord.

=== 2007– ===
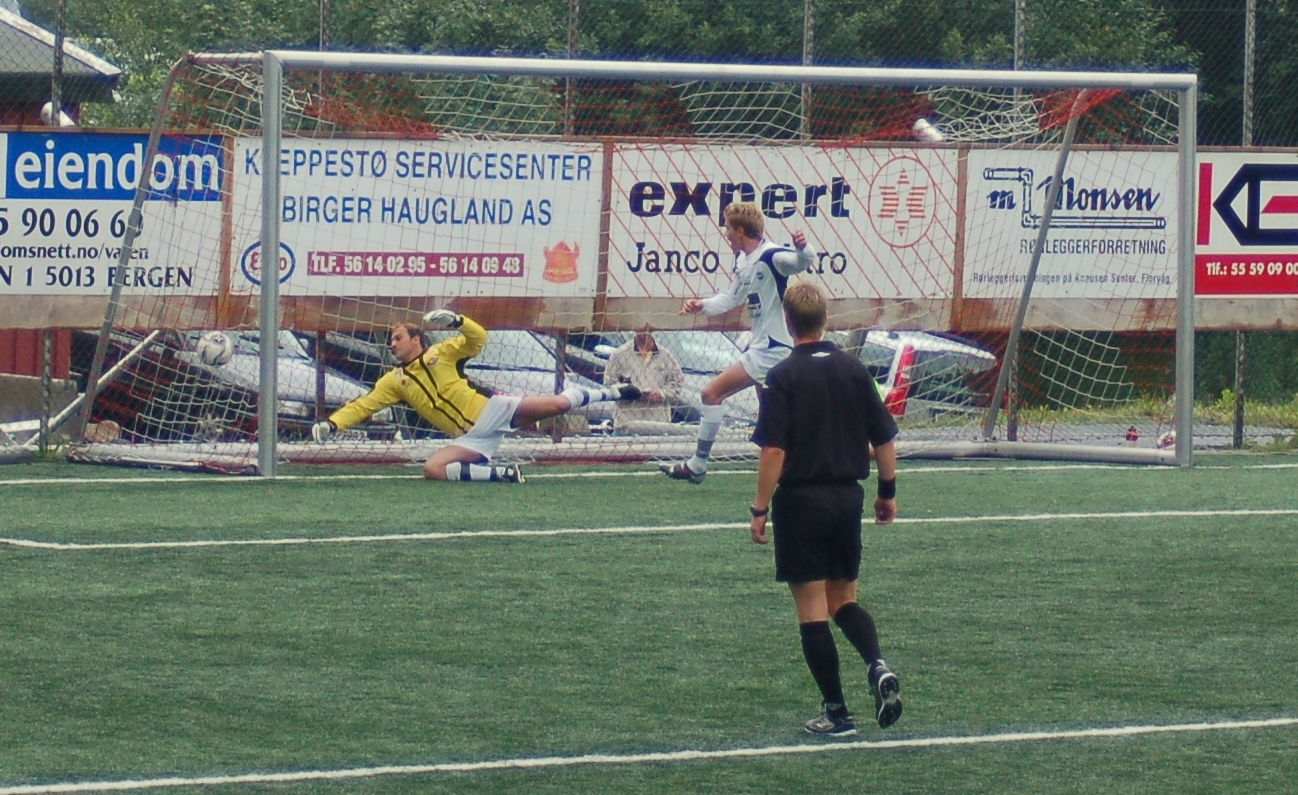
Ålgård takes the lead 1–0 away against Askøy after 8 minutes. The match ended with a 3–2 victory for Ålgård in August 2007. Photo: Rune Sattler

Tommy Bergersen replaced Svendsen as manager in 2007. He came from Bryne where he had to retire due to injuries. Eirik Sanne, Tharaldsen, Gustav Kjølberg and Ingve Aarrestad left the club, while Håkon Eikrem and Arnt Ove Ivesdal transferred from Bjerkreim, Jan Tore Lende Fadnes from Bryne and Espen Skogen from EIK. In the summer break, the team was strengthened by Geir Andre Herrem and Oddgeir Salte from Bryne on loan for the remaining part of the season.

Ålgård got a weak start of the season 2007 through defeats by relegation contenders Askøy and Os, but defeated Fana IL at home. ÅFK was helpless against a strong Viking 2. Bergersen protested in Stavanger Aftenblad later in the season against what he and SIF manager Cato A. Hansen felt were destructive use of players after Viking 2 in several matches used their youth team in some matches and strong teams in others.

The club surprised against relegated Manglerud Star and fought a draw at home, then won an important victory away at Fyllingen after a late goal by Rogvi Baldvinsson. The team needed a victory home against FK Arendal, but things looked lost at halftime when Arendal were two up after goals by Geir Tungesvik and former Odd Grenland Armin Sistek. The team did not give in and Urstad headed ÅFK back into the game after only three minutes of second half. Eikrem was sent up the field as striker aside Skogen and equalized only two minutes after Urstads goal. The match was finally turned when Sivertsen six minutes later curled the ball passed Arendals goalkeeper after getting a freekick just outside the penalty area.

No goals were scored in the next two matches, but drew against Vard Haugesund before winning 2–0 away at Åsane. ÅFK then lost 4–1 in a friendly match against Luton Town at Ålgård stadion where the team was reinforced by SIF-players Cato A. Hansen and Rolf Magne Olsen.

Fall started with nine points in four games, followed by two points in the three next. The last six games were lost. Things was not better in other relegation battling teams, except for Åsane who fought their way back from being hopelessly lost to getting a last chance against Ålgård in the last match of the season. If winning by two goals Åsane would stay while Ålgård was relegated. ÅFK got many chances to finish Åsanes hope early on, but Åsane still took the lead in first half and went two up with only ten minutes to go. Ålgård was as good as relegated. Two minutes before full-time, Jonas Vølstad Fjeldsbø got a freekick at the edge of the penalty area by the goal line. Oddbjørn Sivertsen struck the ball into the box where Baldvinsson headed the ball down to the feet of Håvard Urstad who forced the ball over the line. Ålgård had avoided relegation.

After the season ended, Ålgård was left with 11 players from 2007, and the club started building a new team. ÅFK got Joakim Bjordal (from reserves), Stein Morten Hansen (Flekkefjord), Henrik Karlsen (Hana), Alexander Idland (Buøy) and Bård Tommy Karstensen (Sandnes Ulf) as replacements for players like Robert Tveit (Sandnes Ulf), Eikrem, Sivertsen (retired), Høvring and Lende Fadnes. Later Geir André Herrem returned through loan from Bryne after first joining SIF. Goalkeeper Ole Fredrik Bergseth was also lost. Commotion followed the club's attempt to get Ole Gunnar Solskjær to the club.

== Recent history ==
Season		Pos.	Pl.	W	D	L	GS	GA	Pts	Cup	Notes
2006	2. divisjon	6	26	11	5	10	48	51	38	Second round	
2007	2. divisjon	11	26	7	4	15	29	49	25	First round	
2008	2. divisjon	8	26	9	6	11	47	60	33	Second round	
2009	2. divisjon	3	26	15	5	6	55	34	50	Second round	
2010	2. divisjon	10	26	8	10	8	45	36	34	First round	
2011	2. divisjon	8	26	8	10	8	45	43	34	First round	
2012	2. divisjon	6	26	11	5	10	36	48	38	Second round	
2013	2. divisjon	9	26	9	6	11	38	37	33	First round	
2014	2. divisjon	↓ 14	26	7	2	17	32	63	23	First round	Relegated to 3. divisjon
