= Einar Larsen =

Einar Larsen may refer to:

- Einar Bruno Larsen (1939–2021), Norwegian footballer and ice hockey player
- Einar Larsen (footballer, born 1904) (1904–1977), Norwegian footballer
- Einar Larsen (Danish footballer) (1900–1981)
