= Paul Due =

Paul Due may refer to:

- Paul Due (architect) (1835–1919), Norwegian architect
  - Paul Armin Due (1870–1926), Norwegian architect and son of the above
- Paul Due (footballer) (1889–1972), Norwegian international footballer
