= Medalen =

Medalen is a surname. Notable people with the surname include:

- Linda Medalen (born 1965), Norwegian footballer
- Rune Medalen (born 1970), Norwegian footballer
