= Georg Andersen =

Georg Andersen may refer to:

- Georg Andersen (athlete) (born 1963), Norwegian shot putter
- Georg Andersen (footballer) (1893–1974), Norwegian footballer

== See also ==
- George Anderson (disambiguation)
- George Andersen (1900–1965), American lawyer
