= Ole Hjelmhaug =

Norwegian footballer (born 1976)

Personal information
- Date of birth: 27 May 1976 (age 50)
- Place of birth: Lærdal, Norway
- Height: 1.84 m (6 ft 0 in)
- Position: Defender

Youth career
- Sogndal

Senior career*
Years	Team	Apps	(Gls)
1997–1998	Sogndal	39	(3)
1999–2003	Bryne	110	(12)
2004–2006	Sogndal	75	(13)

International career
1992	Norway U15	2	(0)
1993	Norway U16	2	(1)
1994	Norway U17	7	(1)
1995	Norway U18	9	(1)
1996	Norway U21	1	(0)

Managerial career
- 2010–2011: Stord
- 2012–2016: Bryne (assistant)
- 2016–2018: Bryne
- 2020–2021: Ålgård
- * Club domestic league appearances and goals

Ole Hjelmhaug (born 27 May 1976) is a retired Norwegian football defender and later manager.

He played two periods for Sogndal and one for Bryne, and was capped on most youth levels for Norway.

Hjelmhaug started a coaching career in 2010, being hired in Stord IL. In 2012 he rejoined Bryne as assistant manager, being promoted to manager in 2016. He was sacked in 2018. In September 2020 he was hired by Ålgård FK.
