= Kirkemo =

Kirkemo is a Norwegian surname that may refer to the following notable people:

- Folke Kirkemo (1899–1967), Norwegian football player
- H. E. Kirkemo (1894–1987), American architect
- Leland Kirkemo (1920–2010), United States Navy captain of Norwegian origin
