= Sverre Lie =

Sverre Lie may refer to:

- Sverre Lie (footballer) (1888–1983), Norwegian international footballer
- Sverre Lie (tennis) (1926–1983), Norwegian tennis player
