= Tunheim (surname) =

Tunheim is a surname. Notable people with the surname include:

- Jim Tunheim (born 1941), American politician
- John R. Tunheim (born 1953), American lawyer
- Kurt Tunheim (born 1950), Norwegian footballer
