= Tshimanga =

Tshimanga is both a masculine given name and surname. Notable people with the surname include:

== Given name ==
- Christian Tshimanga Kabeya (born 1987), Belgian footballer
- Tshimanga "Tim" Biakabutuka (born 1974), American football player
- Xavier Tshimanga Kamaluba Ntite Mukendi Mpoyi Mbuyamba (born 2001), Dutch footballer
- Zacharie Tshimanga Wa Tshibangu (born 1941), Congolese historian and writer

== Surname ==
- Betu Adolphe Tshimanga (born 1980), Congolese footballer
- Christophe Mulumba-Tshimanga (born 1993), Canadian football player
- Derrick Tshimanga (born 1998), Belgian footballer
- Ebenezer Tshimanga (born 2002), South African rugby player
- Holly Tshimanga (born 1997), Belgian footballer
- Jordy Tshimanga (born 1996), Canadian basketball player
- Kabongo Tshimanga (born 1997), DR Congolese footballer
