= Truls Klausen =

Norwegian footballer (born 1946)

Personal information
- Full name: Rolf Fredrik Klausen
- Date of birth: 23 March 1946 (age 80)
- Position: Defender

Senior career*
Years	Team	Apps	(Gls)
- Frigg Oslo
- Vålerenga Fotball
- FK Bodø/Glimt
- * Club domestic league appearances and goals

Rolf Fredrik "Truls" Klausen (born 23 March 1946) is a Norwegian former professional footballer who played as defender. After starting his career with Frigg Oslo and Vålerenga Fotball in the early 1970s, he spent most of his career, from 1975 to 1984, at FK Bodø/Glimt, who won the 1975 Norwegian Football Cup in his first season and were promoted the following season to Eliteserien. He was team captain from 1981 and subsequently worked with the team as a coach and physiotherapist.

== Playing career ==
Raised in Narvik, Klausen distinguished himself in youth football at Nor before beginning his professional career in Oslo, where he played for Frigg in Eliteserien, the Norwegian top league. After moving to Bodø in 1975, he joined Bodø/Glimt and was on their Norwegian Cup-winning team that year as well as the team that came second in their first season after promotion to Eliteserien in 1977. In summer 1980 he was on short-term loan to Nor; in 1981 he succeeded Harald Berg as team captain at Bodø/Glimt, retiring in 1984.

== Physiotherapy and coaching ==
Starting in the 1970s, Klausen also worked as a physiotherapist. For over 40 years he had a clinic in Bodø specialising in sports injuries, and he was also a qualified coach; he taught health in schools, coached the first team at Bodø-Glimt for a couple of years, and coached youth teams while his sons were playing. On 16 May 1995, he was working for Glimt as a physiotherapist at a match against Tromsø Idrettslag when Harald Aabrekk, the Tromsø coach, fell on the sidelines and was carried off and taken to a hospital; Aabrekk said that Klausen had "tackled" him, occasioning wide press coverage. Klausen denied doing more than accidentally touch Aabrekk. He retired in 2013.

== Personal life ==
In 1970, Klausen married Ann-Karin Bodøgaard, then a pop singer and later a teacher of ballet and dance instruction; they have three sons and a daughter, Maria Bodøgaard. They restored and lived in the oldest house in Bodø, Bodøgård. After his retirement they moved to Son, where he became the groundskeeper for HSV Fotball.
