= Rune Medalen =

Norwegian footballer (born 1970)

Personal information
- Date of birth: 13 April 1970 (age 56)
- Height: 1.84 m (6 ft 0 in)
- Position: Striker

Senior career*
Years	Team	Apps	(Gls)
–1992	Ålgård		
1993	Bryne		
1994–1995	Viking	36	(6)
1996	Sogndal		
1997–2003	Bryne	128	(37)
- * Club domestic league appearances and goals

Rune Medalen (born 13 April 1970) is a retired Norwegian football striker.

A first cousin of Linda Medalen, he went from third-tier Ålgård FK in 1992 to being Bryne FK's top goalscorer in 1993 and securing a contract with Viking FK in 1994. In 1996 he was shipped on to Sogndal Fotball, returning to Rogaland and Bryne FK in 1997. The transfer fees went from 195,000 kr to Viking, 170,000 kr to Sogndal and 175,000 kr to Bryne.

In 2003, his contract was due to expire at the end of the year, and at the onset of the season Medalen faced long-term injury, meaning that he never returned to professional football.
