= Karsten Johannessen =

Norwegian footballer and coach (1925–2018)

Personal information
- Date of birth: 30 November 1925
- Date of death: 16 December 2018 (aged 93)
- Place of death: Kristiansand, Norway

Senior career*
Years	Team	Apps	(Gls)
1945–?	Start		

Managerial career
- 1954–1955: Start
- 1957: Start
- 1961: Start
- 1967–1968: Start
- 1971–1974: Start
- 1978–1981: Start
- 1985: Start
- 1988–1989: Start
- 1996: Start
- * Club domestic league appearances and goals

Karsten Johannessen (30 November 1925 – 16 December 2018) was a Norwegian footballer and coach for IK Start.

== Biography ==
=== Playing career ===
Johannessen played for Start after World War II. In 1945, he got his debut for the club aged 19, only few months after he was released from Grini detention camp.

=== Coaching career ===
Karsten Johannessen is historically the most significant coach for the club, having held the position as coach in eighteen seasons, in nine different terms; starting in 1954 and ending in 1996. IK Start has won its two only victories in the Norwegian top division (in 1978 and 1980) under Johannessen's tenure as coach. Start finished third in the league in both 1973 and 1979. In 2011, he was awarded the King's Medal of Merit in silver for his efforts for football in Southern Norway.

== Political views ==
Besides football, Johannessen was also active in local politics. He was a councillor in the Kristiansand city council for the Progress Party in two terms, until he helped found the Democrats party.

== Honours ==
Head coach
Start

- Norwegian top division: 1978, 1980
