= Knut Tørum =

Norwegian football coach (born 1971)

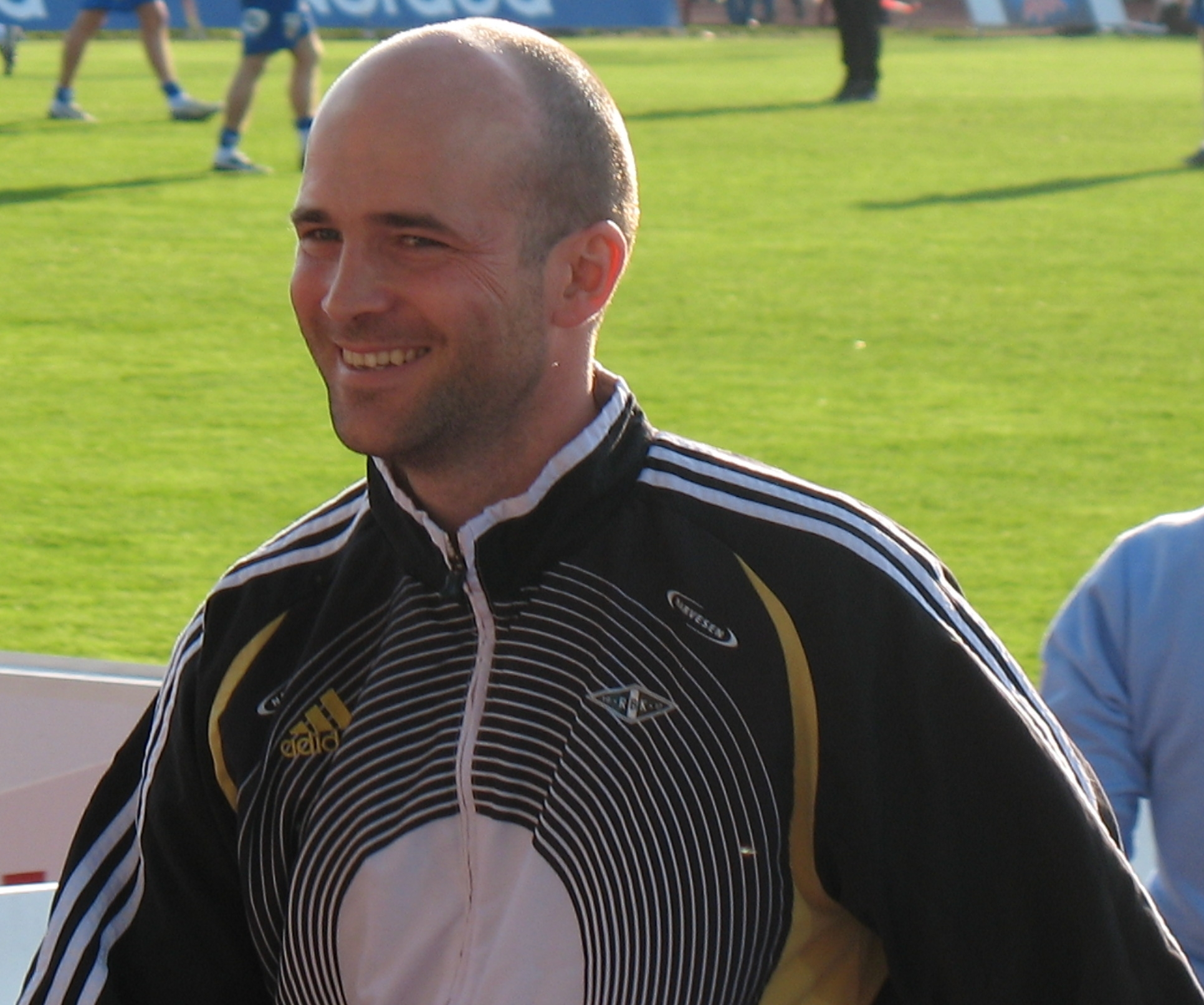

Personal information
- Date of birth: 16 August 1971 (age 55)
- Place of birth: Bergen, Norway
- Position: Midfielder

Managerial career
- Years: Team
- 2006–2007: Rosenborg
- 2008–2011: Start
- 2013–2014: Norway U21
- 2014–2017: Arendal

Knut Kjartan Tørum (born 16 August 1971) is a Norwegian football coach. He is a former manager for Moss FK, leading the team to the Tippeliga play-off's in 2005. He is also a former assistant coach for Stabæk Fotball.

In August 2006, Per Mathias Høgmo took a two-month sick leave from Rosenborg BK as its head football coach; Tørum (at the time the club's assistant coach) took over as substitute head-coach. Rosenborg was very successful under his guidance starting with a club record eight consecutive game wins and earned Tørum the title coach of the month for August and October 2006. Despite Tørums success, Rosenborg announced that Høgmo would return to his job after the season. Rosenborg led in league competition that season earning gold medals. On 31 October, Høgmo decided to retire as Rosenborg head coach. Tørum was offered the job as new head coach in Rosenborg, accepted and would eventually be named coach of the year for 2006.

The 2006 season success was not replicated in the 2007 season, but Rosenborg managed to qualify for the UEFA Champions League where the club impressed in the group stage with a 1-1 draw away against Chelsea FC and beating Valencia CF 2-0 twice. Tørum resigned the day after the latter match against Valencia.

Tørum was appointed as head-coach of IK Start in December 2008. He resigned this position 22 June 2011, hours before a cup match against Strømsgodset IF. After leaving his job at Start, Tørum and his family wanted to stay in Kristiansand, and in December 2011 he got a non-football job in Kristiansand. In January 2013, he was appointed as Tor Ole Skullerud's assistant coach of the Norway under-21 team.

He has his education from the Norwegian School of Sport Sciences.

== Honours ==
Norway

- Tippeligaen: 2006

Individual

- Tippeligaen Coach of the Month: August 2006, October 2006
- Kniksen Award Coach of the Year: 2006
