= Gunnar Stensland =

Norwegian footballer and coach (1922-2011)

Personal information
- Date of birth: 11 January 1922
- Place of birth: Ålgård, Norway
- Date of death: 24 November 2011 (aged 89)
- Position: Midfielder

Senior career*
Years	Team	Apps	(Gls)
1937–1946	Ålgård	98	(?)
1947–1950	Viking	58	(2)
1950–1951	FC Nancy	2	(0)

Managerial career
- 1951–1952: Viking
- 1956: Ålgård
- 1979: Stålkameratene
- * Club domestic league appearances and goals

Gunnar Stensland (11 January 1922 – 24 November 2011) was a Norwegian association football midfielder and coach.

In Norway he played for Ålgård FK and Viking FK. He played 58 games and scored two goals for Viking from 1947 to 1950. In his time with Viking, he was part of their Cup winning team against Skeid in 1947. Later, he played two games for FC Nancy in France, the forerunner of AS Nancy. He was coach of Viking from 1951 to 1952, Ålgård in 1956 and Stålkameratene in 1965.

He was born in Ålgård, attended school in Ålgård and Hana and police academy in Sweden. He worked in the police until retiring in 1979. He died in November 2011.
