= Lasse Opseth =

Norwegian footballer (born 1956)

Personal information
- Date of birth: 27 January 1956 (age 70)
- Place of birth: Førde, Norway

Senior career*
Years	Team	Apps	(Gls)
1973–1979	Førde		
1980–1983	Sogndal	86	(55)
1984	Lillestrøm	22	(3)
1985–1991	Sogndal	143	(50)
1992–1993	Kaupanger		

International career
1982	Norway	1	(0)
- * Club domestic league appearances and goals

Lasse Opseth (born 27 January 1956) is a former Norwegian footballer. Opseth played as a striker, and spent the majority of his career at Sogndal. In 1982, he became the first-ever Sogndal player to be selected for Norway's senior national team.

Opseth grew up in Førde. He played seven seasons for his local team Førde IL, and was top scorer in the 4th Division in 1979. He transferred to Sogndal ahead of the 1980 season. In 1981, he scored 17 goals and helped Sogndal achieve promotion to the Norwegian top division for the first time.

On 15 June 1982, Opseth was selected for Norway as the first-ever Sogndal player to make an appearance for the national team, coming on as a second-half substitute for Gabriel Høyland in a friendly against Denmark, which is also notable as the international debut of Michael Laudrup. This match turned out to be Opseth's only appearance for the national team.

Making his debut in the top flight in 1982, Opseth scored ten goals, but was unable to save Sogndal from relegation. In 1984, he moved to Lillestrøm, but failed to make much of an impact, scoring only three goals, and returned to Sogndal after one season.

In 1987, Opseth was Sogndal's top scorer as they won promotion back to the top flight. In 1988, he was instrumental as Sogndal finished 6th, and avoided relegation in a season where Sogndal as a team scored only 27 goals, ten of which were scored by Opseth. The following season, Sogndal were relegated.

Opseth retired from top-level football at the end of the 1991 season, but did play sporadically in the lower leagues for Kaupanger the next couple of years.

== Personal life ==
Lasse Opseth is the father of Kristian Opseth, who also became a footballer, and currently plays for Stabæk. He was also the nephew of politician Kjell Opseth (Labour Party) who was Norway's Minister of Transportation from 1990 to 1996.
