= Trond Sirevåg =

Norwegian football player (born 1955)

Personal information
- Date of birth: 17 October 1955 (age 71)
- Position: Defender

Senior career*
Years	Team	Apps	(Gls)
1984–1986	Bryne	44	(1)

International career
1973	Norway U-19	4	(0)
1976	Norway U-21	1	(0)
1984	Norway	1	(0)

Managerial career
- 1994–1996: Bryne
- 2009: Bryne
- * Club domestic league appearances and goals

Trond Sirevåg (born 17 October 1955) is a Norwegian former professional footballer and former football manager. He played most of his career at Bryne FK and later became a manager of the sider for two different stints. He made only one cap for the Norway national team, which was during a friendly against Iceland in 1984 which ended in a 1–0 win.
