= Lars Hirschfeld =

Canadian soccer player (born 1978)

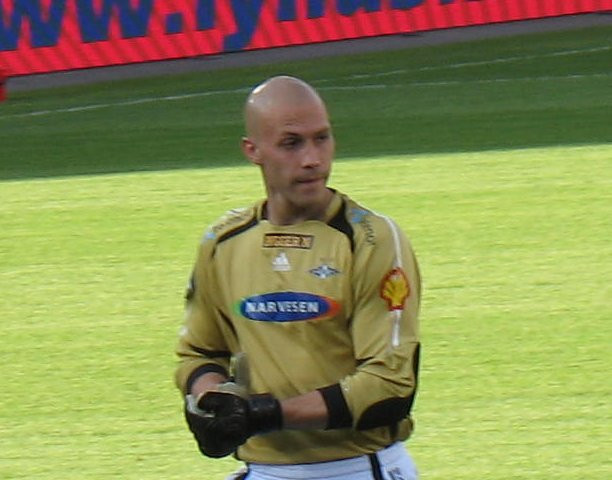
- Hirschfeld with Rosenborg in 2007

Personal information
- Full name: Lars Justin Hirschfeld
- Date of birth: 17 October 1978 (age 48)
- Place of birth: Edmonton, Alberta, Canada
- Height: 1.90 m (6 ft 3 in)
- Position: Goalkeeper

Youth career
- 1997: Edmonton Ital-Canadians

Senior career*
Years	Team	Apps	(Gls)
1997–1998	Edmonton Drillers (indoor)	1	(0)
1998–2000	Energie Cottbus II	60	(0)
2000	Calgary Storm	20	(0)
2001	Vancouver Whitecaps	1	(0)
2001–2002	Calgary Storm	32	(0)
2002–2004	Tottenham Hotspur	0	(0)
2003	→ Luton Town (loan)	5	(0)
2004	→ Gillingham (loan)	2	(0)
2004–2005	Dundee United	2	(0)
2005	Leicester City	1	(0)
2005	Tromsø	11	(0)
2006–2007	Rosenborg	52	(0)
2008–2009	CFR Cluj	5	(0)
2009	Energie Cottbus	0	(0)
2010–2015	Vålerenga	93	(0)
2016	KFUM	30	(0)
Total		314	(0)

International career
1999	Canada U23	4	(0)
2000–2013	Canada	48	(0)

Managerial career
- 2018-2019: St. FX Academy Edmonton (goalkeeper coach)
- 2019-2021: FC Edmonton (goalkeeper coach)
- MacEwan Griffins (goalkeeper coach)
Medal record
Representing Canada
Men's soccer
CONCACAF Gold Cup
Third place	2002 United States
- * Club domestic league appearances and goals

Lars Justin Hirschfeld (born 17 October 1978) is a Canadian retired soccer player who played as a goalkeeper. Hirschfeld was inducted to the Canada Soccer Hall of Fame in 2025.

== Club career ==
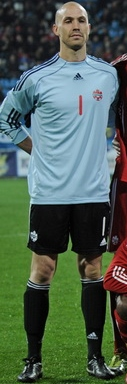

Born in Edmonton, Alberta, of German descent, Hirschfeld started his career with the Edmonton Drillers, playing indoor soccer. He also played with Energie Cottbus in Germany, Calgary Storm, and Vancouver Whitecaps.

=== England and Scotland ===
In September 2002, Hirschfeld joined Premier League club Tottenham Hotspur, but never featured for the first team. He went on loan to Luton Town and Gillingham before being released and joining Dundee United in August 2004. A move to Leicester City followed in January 2005, but Hirschfeld only made one appearance, keeping a clean sheet in a 0–0 draw against Plymouth Argyle on the last day of the season.

=== Norway ===
Tromsø IL then signed Hirschfeld as a replacement goalkeeper for the remainder of the 2005 Tippeligaen. Hirschfeld made some crucial saves during Tromsø's campaign to avoid relegation and was a key figure in the UEFA Cup matches against Esbjerg fB and Galatasaray, both of which Tromsø won. Nordlys, a local newspaper, called Hirschfeld the greatest goalkeeper ever to play for Tromsø IL after only six matches at his new club, ranking him ahead of Einar Rossbach, Knut Borch and Bjarte Flem.

The following season, Hirschfeld won the Norwegian Tippeligaen with Rosenborg, having beaten Espen Johnsen for first-string goalie at the club. Hirschfeld was in goal when Rosenborg defeated Valencia CF twice in the 2007–08 UEFA Champions League group stage, recording two clean sheets in home-and-away 2–0 wins. He made a number of saves in his side's 1–1 draw away to English club Chelsea, the last match in charge of Chelsea for manager José Mourinho.

=== CFR Cluj ===
Hirschfeld played for CFR Cluj in Romania after joining from Rosenborg for €1.3 million on 6 January 2008. With Cluj he immediately won the domestic double but he only played in five games in that first (half) season and he did not play at all for them in 2008/2009.

=== Energie Cottbus ===
Hirschfeld signed a two-year contract with Energie Cottbus on 26 June 2009.

=== Return to Norway ===
On 15 January 2010, he left his club Energie Cottbus and signed for Oslo club Vålerenga Fotball in Norway.

On 21 January 2016, he signed with KFUM which were promoted to the OBOS-ligaen (Norwegian second level) for the first time in 2015.

== Coaching career ==
In January 2019 Hirschfeld joined FC Edmonton as their goalkeeping coach.

== International career ==
Hirschfeld made his debut for Canada in a January 2000 friendly match against Bermuda but had to compete with Pat Onstad for the national goalkeeper's jersey. By November 2009, he earned a total of 29 caps. He has represented Canada in 6 FIFA World Cup qualification matches. Hirschfeld's big break with Canada came at the 2002 CONCACAF Gold Cup, where he was named the best goalkeeper of the tournament after allowing only four goals in five matches and recording an impressive semifinal shutout against the United States. This caused English club Tottenham Hotspur F.C. to take interest, and Hirschfeld signed with them in September 2002. On 8 June 2012, Hirschfeld was sent off in a 2014 World Cup qualifier against Cuba for handling the ball outside his penalty area, but Canada prevailed by a score of 1–0 despite the numerical disadvantage.

== Honours ==
=== Player ===
Rosenborg

- Norwegian Premier League: 2006

CFR Cluj

- Liga I: 2007–08
- Romanian Cup: 2008–09

Canada

- CONCACAF Gold Cup: 3rd place, 2002

=== Individual ===
- CONCACAF Gold Cup Most Valuable Goalkeeper: 2002
- The Voyageurs Player of the Year third place: 2007
- Canada Soccer Hall of Fame: 2025
