= Marius Helle =

Norwegian footballer (born 1983)

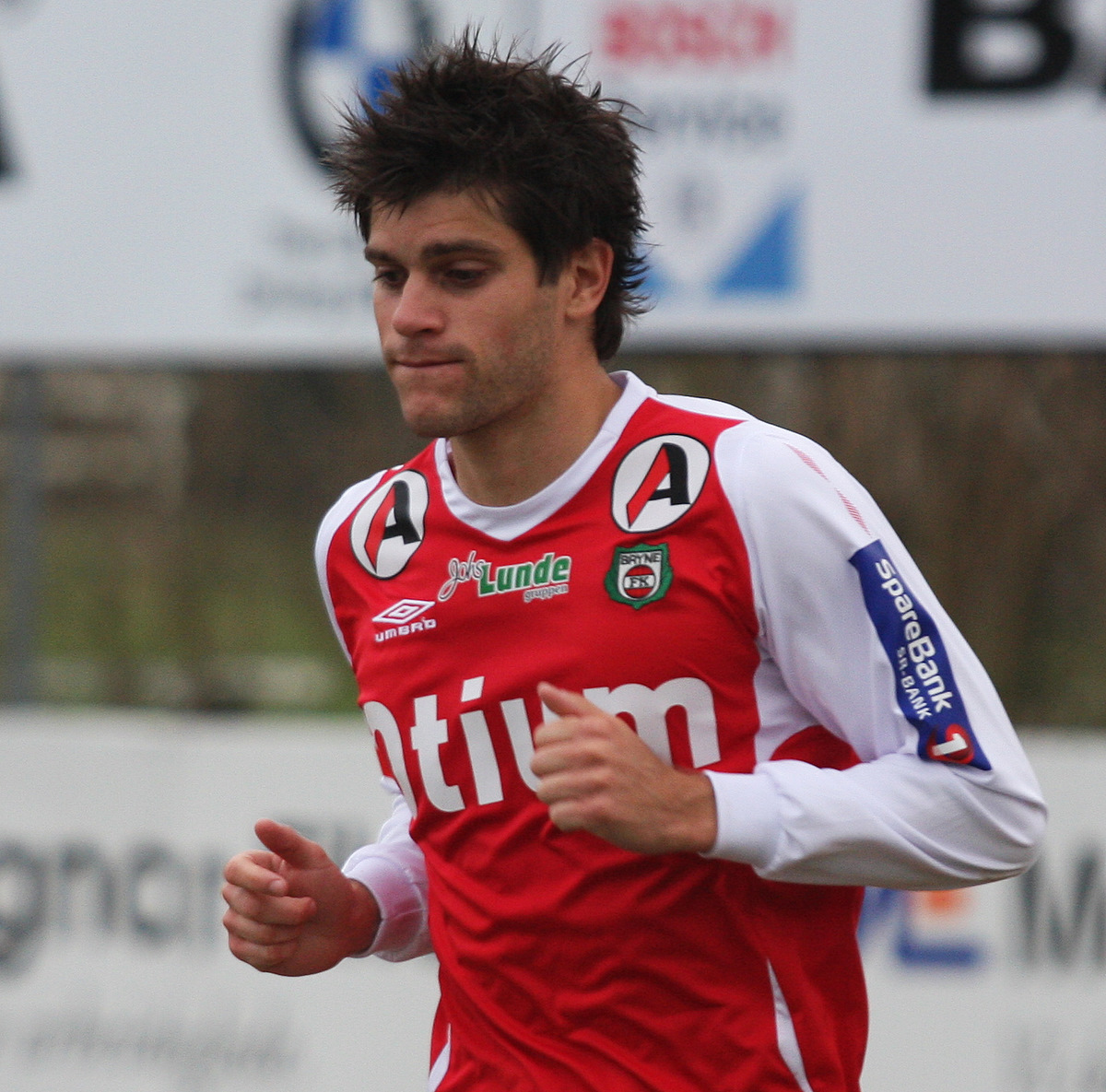

Personal information
- Date of birth: 11 August 1983 (age 43)
- Place of birth: Stavanger, Norway
- Height: 6 ft 0 in (1.83 m)
- Position: Forward

Senior career*
Years	Team	Apps	(Gls)
–2005	Ålgård	?	(?)
2006–2010	Bryne	110	(47)
2010	Stabæk	7	(2)
2011–2012	Bryne	44	(12)
2012–2016	Sandnes Ulf	106	(12)
2016	Bryne	13	(5)
- * Club domestic league appearances and goals as of 2 November 2016

Marius Helle (born 11 August 1983) is a former Norwegian footballer.

== Club career ==
Marius Helle became top scorer for Ålgård in 2005, creating huge interest from many Norwegian football clubs. Marius Helle had trials with various Norwegian clubs, including Bodø/Glimt, Brann, Bryne and Viking. He ended up signing for Bryne in 2006.

Marius Helle transferred from Bryne to Tippeligaen side Stabæk in August 2010. On 22 August 2010, on his debut for Stabæk, he scored his first goal for the club in the 4-0 away win against Hønefoss.

He later returned to Bryne, but in mid-2012 he signed for Sandnes Ulf. On 31 October 2016 Helle decided to retire after Bryne was relegated.

== Career statistics ==
As of 2 November 2016

Season	Club	Division	League		Cup		Total	
Season	Club	Division	Apps	Goals	Apps	Goals	Apps	Goals
2006	Bryne	Adeccoligaen	12	3	0	0	12	3
2007	Bryne	Adeccoligaen	27	7	1	1	28	8
2008	Bryne	Adeccoligaen	27	6	0	0	27	6
2009	Bryne	Adeccoligaen	29	14	2	1	31	15
2010	Bryne	Adeccoligaen	15	17	3	4	18	21
2010	Stabæk	Tippeligaen	7	2	0	0	7	2
2011	Bryne	Adeccoligaen	28	8	1	0	29	8
2012	Bryne	Adeccoligaen	16	4	2	1	18	5
2012	Sandnes Ulf	Tippeligaen	12	1	0	0	12	1
2013	Sandnes Ulf	Tippeligaen	27	6	1	2	28	8
2014	Sandnes Ulf	Tippeligaen	24	0	1	0	25	0
2015	Sandnes Ulf	OBOS-ligaen	29	4	1	0	30	4
2016	Sandnes Ulf	OBOS-ligaen	14	1	3	1	17	2
2016	Bryne	OBOS-ligaen	13	5	0	0	13	5
Career Total			280	78	15	10	295	88
