= Helge Aune =

Norwegian footballer (born 1973)

Personal information
- Date of birth: 6 September 1973 (age 53)
- Height: 1.88 m (6 ft 2 in)
- Position: Defender

Senior career*
Years	Team	Apps	(Gls)
1994	Rosenborg	2	(0)
1995–2000	Bodø/Glimt	46	(3)

Managerial career
- 2004–2005: Ålgård
- * Club domestic league appearances and goals

Helge Aune (born 6 September 1973) is a retired Norwegian football defender.

He played for Rosenborg BK and the Norwegian under-21 national team early in his career. In 1995, he joined Bodø/Glimt. However, he was often injured, and never fully broke into the first team. He retired as an active player after the 2000 season. In 2004 and 2005 he coached Ålgård FK.
