= Rune Ottesen =

Norwegian footballer (born 1954)

Personal information
- Full name: Rune Ottesen
- Date of birth: 7 February 1954
- Position: Midfielder

Senior career*
Years	Team	Apps	(Gls)
1975–1976	Vard Haugesund		
1977–1984	Bryne		

International career
1975–1981	Norway	17	(1)
- * Club domestic league appearances and goals

Rune Ottesen (born 7 February 1954) is a former Norwegian footballer who played as a midfielder for Vard Haugesund and Bryne. He won seventeen caps for Norway between 1975 and 1981 and scored one goal, in a 2–1 win over Sweden in 1977.
