= Arne Riberg =

Norwegian footballer (1909–1982)

Personal information
- Date of birth: 23 June 1909
- Date of death: 3 April 1982 (aged 72)

International career
Years	Team	Apps	(Gls)
1931	Norway	1	(0)

Arne Riberg (23 June 1909 – 3 April 1982) was a Norwegian footballer. He played in one match for the Norway national football team in 1931.
