= Peder Henriksen =

Norwegian footballer (1890–1975)

Personal information
- Date of birth: 9 June 1890
- Date of death: 9 November 1975 (aged 85)

International career
Years	Team	Apps	(Gls)
1915	Norway	1	(0)

Peder Henriksen (9 June 1890 – 9 November 1975) was a Norwegian footballer. He played in one match for the Norway national football team in 1915.
