= Frantz Magnussen =

Norwegian footballer (1892–1963)

Personal information
- Date of birth: 27 December 1892
- Date of death: 27 May 1963 (aged 70)

International career
Years	Team	Apps	(Gls)
1919	Norway	1	(0)

Frantz Magnussen (27 December 1892 – 27 May 1963) was a Norwegian footballer. He played in one match for the Norway national football team in 1919.
