= Bjørn Berger =

Norwegian footballer (1919-1995)

Personal information
- Date of birth: 19 December 1919
- Date of death: 27 April 1995 (aged 75)
- Position: Defender

International career
Years	Team	Apps	(Gls)
1945	Norway	1	(0)

Bjørn Berger (19 December 1919 – 27 April 1995) was a Norwegian footballer. He played in one match for the Norway national football team in 1945.
