= Henry Henriksen =

Norwegian footballer (1921-1984)

Personal information
- Date of birth: 25 August 1921
- Date of death: 17 January 1984 (aged 62)

International career
Years	Team	Apps	(Gls)
1949	Norway	1	(0)

Henry Henriksen (25 August 1921 – 17 January 1984) was a Norwegian footballer. He played in one match for the Norway national football team in 1949.
