= Erland Ellingsen =

Norwegian footballer (1900-1973)

Personal information
- Date of birth: 27 September 1900
- Place of birth: Drammen, Norway
- Date of death: 17 January 1973 (aged 72)
- Position: Forward

International career
Years	Team	Apps	(Gls)
1922	Norway	1	(0)

Erland Ellingsen (27 September 1900 – 17 January 1973) was a Norwegian footballer. He played in one match for the Norway national football team in 1922.
