= Johan Hallberg =

Norwegian footballer (1891-1967)

Personal information
- Date of birth: 18 October 1891
- Date of death: 17 April 1967 (aged 75)

International career
Years	Team	Apps	(Gls)
1913	Norway	1	(0)

Johan Hallberg (18 October 1891 – 17 April 1967) was a Norwegian footballer. He played in one match for the Norway national football team in 1913.
