= Arne Svendsen (footballer) =

Norwegian footballer (1909–1983)

Personal information
- Date of birth: 13 July 1909
- Date of death: 28 April 1983 (aged 73)

International career
Years	Team	Apps	(Gls)
1933	Norway	1	(0)

Arne Svendsen (13 July 1909 – 28 April 1983) was a Norwegian footballer. He played in one match for the Norway national football team in 1933.
