= Ole Kristian Olsen =

Norwegian footballer (born 1950)

Personal information
- Date of birth: 25 July 1950 (age 76)

International career
Years	Team	Apps	(Gls)
1976	Norway	1	(0)

Ole Kristian Olsen (born 25 July 1950) is a Norwegian footballer. He played in one match for the Norway national football team in 1976.
