= Gabriel Høyland =

Norwegian footballer and manager (born 1955)

Personal information
- Full name: Gabriel Høyland
- Date of birth: 10 February 1955 (age 71)
- Place of birth: Bryne, Norway
- Positions: Midfielder; striker

Youth career
- Bryne

Senior career*
Years	Team	Apps	(Gls)
1971–1986	Bryne	294	(69)
1987–1988	Klepp		

International career
1974–1982	Norway	23	(3)

Managerial career
- 2001: Bryne
- 2009: Bryne
- * Club domestic league appearances and goals

Gabriel Høyland (born 10 February 1955) is a former Norwegian footballer who played for Norwegian team Bryne. Høyland began his career as a striker, and later became an attacking midfielder. He is widely regarded as Bryne's greatest player of all time, and was a key player in the team's 1980s glory days, when the team finished second in the Norwegian top division twice (1980 and 1982). In all competitions, including friendlies, Høyland played 596 first-team matches and scored 170 goals for Bryne, including 294 matches and 69 goals in league competition. He also won 23 caps for Norway, and scored three international goals.

He is a member of the Braut footballing family and the great-uncle of Erling Haaland.
