= Erling Lindberg =

Norwegian footballer (1903-1968)

Personal information
- Date of birth: 4 March 1903
- Date of death: 29 May 1968 (aged 65)

International career
Years	Team	Apps	(Gls)
1929	Norway	1	(0)

Erling Lindberg (4 March 1903 – 29 May 1968) was a Norwegian footballer. He played in one match for the Norway national football team in 1929.
