= Frithjof Skonnord =

Norwegian footballer (1887-1971)

Personal information
- Date of birth: 2 April 1887
- Date of death: 30 September 1971 (aged 84)

International career
Years	Team	Apps	(Gls)
1908	Norway	1	(0)

Frithjof Skonnord (2 April 1887 – 30 September 1971) was a Norwegian footballer. He played in one match for the Norway national football team in 1908.
