= Erling Gustavsen =

Norwegian footballer (1896-1981)

Personal information
- Date of birth: 6 September 1896
- Date of death: 22 October 1981 (aged 85)

International career
Years	Team	Apps	(Gls)
1918	Norway	1	(0)

Erling Gustavsen (6 September 1896 – 22 October 1981) was a Norwegian footballer. He played in one match for the Norway national football team in 1918.
