= Olaf Iversen =

Norwegian footballer (1894-1921)

Personal information
- Date of birth: 27 August 1894
- Date of death: 11 September 1921 (aged 27)
- Place of death: Lillehammer

International career
Years	Team	Apps	(Gls)
1914	Norway	1	(0)

Olaf Iversen (27 August 1894 – 11 September 1921) was a Norwegian footballer. He played in one match for the Norway national football team in 1914. Iversen died in a traffic collision near Lillehammer.
