= Thorleif Hartung =

Norwegian footballer (1907-1982)

Personal information
- Date of birth: 1 July 1907
- Date of death: 6 June 1982 (aged 74)

International career
| Years | Team | Apps | (Gls) |
| 1933 | Norway | 1 | (0) |

Thorleif Hartung (1 July 1907 – 6 June 1982) was a Norwegian footballer. He played in one match for the Norway national football team in 1933.
