= Erling Gripp =

Norwegian footballer (1923-1957)

Personal information
- Date of birth: 15 January 1923
- Date of death: 25 January 1957 (aged 34)

International career
Years	Team	Apps	(Gls)
1947	Norway	1	(0)

Erling Gripp (15 January 1923 – 25 January 1957) was a Norwegian footballer. He played in one match for the Norway national football team in 1947. Gripp died of a brain hemorrhage.
