= Nils Berntsen =

Norwegian footballer (1901-1929)

Personal information
- Full name: Nils Anton Owren Berntsen
- Date of birth: 17 January 1901
- Place of birth: Oslo, Norway
- Date of death: 31 May 1929 (aged 28)
- Position: Midfielder

International career
Years	Team	Apps	(Gls)
1924	Norway	1	(0)

Nils Berntsen (17 January 1901 – 31 May 1929) was a Norwegian footballer. He played in one match for the Norway national football team in 1924.
