= Johannes Stensletten =

Norwegian footballer (1912-1981)

Personal information
- Date of birth: 15 December 1912
- Date of death: 21 September 1981 (aged 68)

International career
Years	Team	Apps	(Gls)
1939	Norway	1	(0)

Johannes Stensletten (15 December 1912 – 21 September 1981) was a Norwegian footballer. He played in one match for the Norway national football team in 1939.
