= Olaf Hegnander =

Norwegian footballer (1897-1958)

Personal information
- Date of birth: 28 October 1897
- Date of death: 24 February 1958 (aged 60)

International career
Years	Team	Apps	(Gls)
1918	Norway	1	(0)

Olaf Hegnander (28 October 1897 – 24 February 1958) was a Norwegian footballer. He played in one match for the Norway national football team in 1918.
