= Samuel Knutzen =

Norwegian footballer (1892-1975)

Personal information
- Date of birth: 15 January 1892
- Date of death: 30 April 1975 (aged 83)

International career
Years	Team	Apps	(Gls)
1912	Norway	1	(0)

Samuel Knutzen (15 January 1892 – 30 April 1975) was a Norwegian footballer. He played in one match for the Norway national football team in 1912.
