= Birk Engstrøm =

Norwegian footballer (born 1950)

Personal information
- Date of birth: 24 March 1950 (age 76)
- Position: Defender

Senior career*
Years	Team	Apps	(Gls)
1967	Ålgård FK		
1968–1983	Bryne FK		

International career
1977	Norway MNT	1	(0)
- * Club domestic league appearances and goals

Birk Engstrøm (born 24 March 1950) is a former Norwegian football striker.

He first played for Ålgård FK, but spent most of his career at Bryne, most notably in the Norwegian Premier League between 1976 and 1983.

He was selected once for the Norwegian national team, in 1977.
