= Betu Adolphe Tshimanga =

Congolese footballer (born 1980)

Betu
Personal information
- Full name: Betu Adolphe Tshimanga
- Date of birth: 21 June 1980 (age 46)
- Place of birth: Kinshasa, DR Congo
- Position: Midfielder

Senior career*
Years	Team	Apps	(Gls)
2000–2002	AS Vita Club	39	(10)
2002–2005	Jomo Cosmos	?	(?)
2005	Bryne FK	?	(?)
2006	AC Sodigraf	?	(?)
2007–2009	FC Saint Eloi Lupopo	?	(?)
2009–2011	Al Sahel	?	(?)

International career
2001	DR Congo	1	(0)
- * Club domestic league appearances and goals as of 14:43, 18 February 2011 (UTC)

Betu Adolphe Tshimanga (born 21 June 1980), commonly known as Betu, is a Congolese former footballer.
