= Alf Johansen =

Norwegian footballer (1903–1974)

Personal information
- Date of birth: 1 January 1903
- Date of death: 3 July 1974 (aged 71)

International career
Years	Team	Apps	(Gls)
1926	Norway	1	(0)

Alf Johansen (1 January 1903 – 3 July 1974) was a Norwegian footballer. He played in one match for the Norway national football team in 1926.
