= Wilhelm Strand =

Norwegian footballer (1892-1975)

Personal information
- Date of birth: 27 August 1892
- Date of death: 21 September 1975 (aged 83)

International career
Years	Team	Apps	(Gls)
1916	Norway	1	(0)

Wilhelm Strand (27 August 1892 – 21 September 1975) was a Norwegian footballer. He played in one match for the Norway national football team in 1916.
