= Kjell Pettersen =

Norwegian footballer (1912-1967)

Personal information
- Date of birth: 1 March 1912
- Date of death: 26 December 1967 (aged 55)

International career
Years	Team	Apps	(Gls)
1935	Norway	1	(0)

Kjell Pettersen (1 March 1912 – 26 December 1967) was a Norwegian footballer. He played in one match for the Norway national football team in 1935.
