= Harald Schønfeldt =

Norwegian footballer (1896-1950)

Personal information
- Date of birth: 20 April 1896
- Date of death: 23 October 1950 (aged 54)

International career
Years	Team	Apps	(Gls)
1919	Norway	1	(0)

Harald Schønfeldt (20 April 1896 – 23 October 1950) was a Norwegian footballer. He played in one match for the Norway national football team in 1919.
