= Wilhelm Brekke =

Norwegian footballer (1887-1938)

Personal information
- Date of birth: 24 February 1887
- Date of death: 17 May 1938 (aged 51)
- Position: Defender

International career
Years	Team	Apps	(Gls)
1908	Norway	1	(0)

Wilhelm Brekke (24 February 1887 – 17 May 1938) was a Norwegian footballer. He played in one match for the Norway national football team in 1908.
