= Øivind Høibak =

Norwegian footballer (1916-1974)

Personal information
- Date of birth: 25 January 1916
- Place of birth: Mjøndalen, Norway
- Date of death: 11 January 1974 (aged 57)

International career
Years	Team	Apps	(Gls)
1947	Norway	1	(0)

Øivind Høibak (25 January 1916 – 11 January 1974) was a Norwegian footballer. He played in one match for the Norway national football team in 1947.
