= Svein Hammerø =

Norwegian footballer (born 1947)

Personal information
- Full name: Svein Kåre Hammerø
- Date of birth: 10 November 1947 (age 78)
- Place of birth: Stavanger, Norway
- Position: Midfielder

Senior career*
Years	Team	Apps	(Gls)
1966-1973	Viking	121	(32)
1974-1978	Vard		
1979	Stord		
1980-1981	Trio		

International career
1969-1973	Norway U21	14	(1)
1972	Norway	1	(0)

Managerial career
- 1975-1977: Vard (player-manager)
- 1979: Stord (player-manager)
- 1980-1981: Trio (player-manager)
- 1982: Start
- 1983-1985: Vard
- 1986-1988: Djerv 1919
- 1990-1992: Vard
- 2003: FK Haugesund (assistant)
- * Club domestic league appearances and goals

Svein Hammerø (born 10 November 1947) is a Norwegian former footballer.

Hammerø was born in Stavanger, and grew up in nearby Tananger. He was a striker in his early years, later a midfielder, who made his senior debut for Viking in 1966. He played eight seasons for Viking where he won the Norwegian League in 1972 and 1973.

A teacher by profession, Hammerø moved to Haugesund Municipality in 1974 where he joined Vard and was appointed player-manager in 1975. As manager of Vard, he guided the club to the 1975 Norwegian Cup final and also gained promotion to the top division for the first time in the club's history.

At international level, Hammerø had been a regular for Norway Under-21 in his younger days, but only played once for Norway's full national team: the 0-9 defeat against the Netherlands in 1972, which is tied for Norway's heaviest defeat since 1945.

Hammerø ended his playing career in the lower divisions as player-manager of Stord and Trio. In 1982, he was appointed manager of first-tier club Start, but left the club after one season. He also guided Djerv 1919 to the club's first and only season in the top flight in 1988. He has also had two additional spells in charge of his old club Vard. In 2003, he was assistant manager for FK Haugesund.
