= Paul Hauman =

Norwegian footballer (1883-1978)

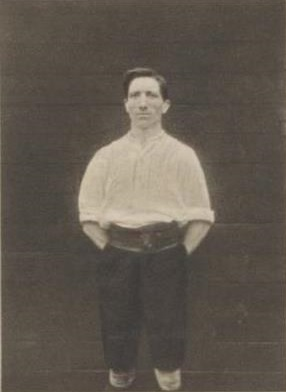

Personal information
- Date of birth: 13 August 1883
- Date of death: 21 February 1978 (aged 94)

International career
Years	Team	Apps	(Gls)
1908	Norway	1	(0)

Paul Hauman (13 August 1883 – 21 February 1978) was a Belgian-Norwegian footballer. He played in one match for the Norway national football team in 1908.
