= Trygve Løken =

Norwegian footballer (1898-1955)

Personal information
- Date of birth: 9 September 1898
- Date of death: 19 August 1955 (aged 56)

International career
Years	Team	Apps	(Gls)
1927	Norway	1	(0)

Trygve Løken (9 September 1898 – 19 August 1955) was a Norwegian footballer. He played in one match for the Norway national football team in 1927.
