= Knut Borch =

Norwegian footballer (born 1980)

Personal information
- Full name: Knut Håkon Borch
- Date of birth: 29 January 1980 (age 46)
- Place of birth: Tromsø, Norway
- Height: 1.94 m (6 ft 4 1/2 in)
- Position: Goalkeeper

Youth career
- Tromsø IL

Senior career*
Years	Team	Apps	(Gls)
1997–2008	Tromsø IL	94	(0)

International career
2005	Norway	1	(0)
- * Club domestic league appearances and goals

Knut Håkon Borch (born 29 January 1980) is a retired football goalkeeper from Tromsø in Norway. He served his military service as an athletics assistant in the Royal Norwegian Navy from July 1999 to June 2000 at Olavsvern Naval Base located in Ramfjorden outside of Tromsø.

Borch studied medicine at the University of Tromsø, and graduated in June 2007 to become a medical doctor.

== Club career ==
As a goalkeeper Borch played for Tromsø IL for his entire career was at the club since 1986. Borch finally secured an undisputed first team position ahead of the 2004 season and played particularly well in the last half of the season.

The 2005 and 2006 season, Borch was plagued with injury problems. Tromsø enlisted Lars Hirschfeld to fill in for Borch during the 2005 season, while Kenny Stamatopoulos and Sead Ramović played for Tromsø during the 2006 season. Borch became injury free during the 2007-season. However, Ramović was Tromsø's first choice even after Borch's return to football. Borch did get one match, a 2-1 loss to Fredrikstad, that Ramović could not play due to suspension.

Borch retired in the summer of 2008, because of his injury problems.

== International career ==
As a result of his great 2004 season, Borch was featured in the first national team call up in 2005. However, he was capped only once for the Norwegian national team.
