= Arvid Arisholm =

Norwegian footballer (1888-1963)

Personal information
- Full name: Arvid Johannessen Arisholm
- Date of birth: 18 September 1888
- Place of birth: Fredrikstad, Norway
- Date of death: 2 February 1963 (aged 74)
- Position: Midfielder

International career
Years	Team	Apps	(Gls)
1908	Norway	1	(0)

Arvid Arisholm (18 September 1888 – 2 February 1963) was a Norwegian footballer. He played in one match for the Norway national football team in 1908.
