= Einar Larsen (footballer, born 1904) =

Norwegian footballer (1904-1977)

Personal information
- Date of birth: 11 September 1904
- Date of death: 24 September 1977 (aged 73)

International career
Years	Team	Apps	(Gls)
1927	Norway	1	(0)

Einar Larsen (11 September 1904 – 24 September 1977) was a Norwegian footballer. He played in one match for the Norway national football team in 1927.
