= Georg Andersen (footballer) =

Norwegian footballer (1893-1974)

Personal information
- Date of birth: 8 November 1893
- Place of birth: Porsgrunn, Norway
- Date of death: 1 January 1974 (aged 80)
- Position: Midfielder

International career
Years	Team	Apps	(Gls)
1913	Norway	1	(0)

Georg Andersen (8 November 1893 – 1 January 1974) was a Norwegian footballer. He played in one match for the Norway national football team in 1913.
