= Sverre Fredriksen =

Norwegian footballer (1906-1961)

Personal information
- Date of birth: 18 February 1906
- Place of birth: Horten, Norway
- Date of death: 8 January 1961 (aged 54)
- Position: Forward

International career
Years	Team	Apps	(Gls)
1929	Norway	1	(0)

Sverre Fredriksen (18 February 1906 – 8 January 1961) was a Norwegian footballer. He played in one match for the Norway national football team in 1929.
