= Bryne FK =

Norwegian association football club

Bryne
- Full name: Bryne Fotballklubb
- Nickname: Jærens superlag (Jæren's super team)
- Founded: 10 April 1926; 100 years ago
- Ground: Bryne Stadion; Bryne; Norway
- Capacity: 5,000 (2,507 seated)
- Chairman: Nils Steinsland
- Head Coach: Ørjan Heiberg
- League: 1. divisjon
- 2026: 1. divisjon, 6th of 16
- Website: brynefk.no
Home colours

Bryne Fotballklubb (Norwegian pronunciation: [ˈbrỳːnə]) is a professional football club located in Bryne, Norway, which competes in the Norwegian First Division, the second tier of Norwegian football. Founded on 10 April 1926 as Bryne Fotball-lag, the club joined the Norwegian Football Federation in 1929 and has played its home matches at Bryne Stadion since 1945.

== History ==
=== Foundation and early years (1926–1946) ===
Prior to 1937, the club did not maintain formal records, resulting in limited documentation of its early history. The team's activities initially consisted of private matches until 1929, when Bryne played its first official fixture against the neighboring club Klepp, ending in a 4–4 draw.

During its early years, Bryne played its home matches on various pastures throughout the Jæren region, with the location of the playing fields often determined by grazing conditions. For much of the 1930s and early 1940s, the club used a small, rented field next to Bryne Mill. Towards the end of the 1930s, the club acquired the site that would become its permanent home, Bryne Stadion. In 1945, after years of playing on borrowed grounds, the club completed the construction of its own stadium. Upon its inauguration in September 1946, Bryne Stadion featured a grass pitch that was among the largest in Norway, a marked improvement from the dimensions of the Bryne Mill field, which measured just 85 by 55 meters.

In 1937, Bryne secured the district championship by defeating Vard Haugesund 3–1 in the final. Notable players from this period included Leonard Lura, brothers Sigurd, Ingvar, and Bjarne Løge, Kåre Hansen, and Bjarne Thu.

Football activities were largely suspended during World War II, though some matches were played clandestinely. Following the war, Bryne experienced renewed success. In 1946, the junior team claimed the Western Norway championship with a 2–1 victory over Pallas in Bergen. Many players from this junior team would go on to form the backbone of the senior squad for years to come. Key players from this era included Laurits B. and Odd H. Sirevaag, Karl Vaaland, and Martin and Kåre Thu, with Laurits B. Sirevaag emerging as a particularly significant figure in the team's development.

In November 2023, former youth player Erling Haaland financed train and bus travel expenses totaling approximately 175,000 Norwegian kroner (£13,000) for around 200 Bryne supporters to attend the club's promotion playoff fixture against IK Start in Kristiansand, marking Bryne's first appearance in the national promotion playoffs since 2006.

=== Local league and rise to national top tier (1949–1975) ===
In 1949, Bryne won the local third tier, earning promotion to the local second tier. The club continued to progress, achieving promotion to the local first tier in 1964 after several near misses. Key players during this era included Kjell Lura, Kristian Hamre, Olav Sigbjørnsen, Gaute Skrudland, Per Undheim, Tor Jan Skretting, Aasbjørn Aasland, Reidar Omdal, Torbjørn Reime, Magnus Grødem, Bjarne Undheim, and Johannes Vold. Since then, Bryne has consistently competed at the middle and top levels of Norwegian football.

In the early 1970s, Bryne faced relegation to the third division for a season, necessitating a period of renewal. A promising youth team emerged during this time, winning the county championship with a decisive 10–1 victory over Sola in the final. Many of these young talents later became pivotal members of the squad that achieved promotion to the top division in 1975.

Although Bryne had come close to reaching the national first division on multiple occasions, they often faltered in the final stages. Ahead of the 1975 season, the club set a clear goal of securing direct promotion to the first division. To achieve this, Gustav Hult returned as head coach, training sessions increased from three to four per week, and funds were allocated for a summer training camp for players and their families. The squad was further bolstered by the addition of three new players: Charles Tjessem from Figgjo, Arild Aadnesen from Nærbø, and Nils Steinsland from Orre. Additionally, three junior players—Kjell Tjåland, Gunnar Orre, and Jan Øvernes—were promoted to the first team, further strengthening the team.

The 1975 season began strongly for Bryne, with victories over Ålesund, Frigg, and Lyn. By the midway point of the season, Bryne led the league with 16 points. Their closest competitors were Vard Haugesund, featuring players Arne Larsen Økland and Rune Ottesen, with 13 points, and Steinkjer with 12 points. As the season progressed, Vard Haugesund and Lyn maintained a strong run of form, closing in on Bryne with only two matches remaining.

In the penultimate round, Bryne faced Vard Haugesund at Haugesund Stadium in what was effectively a promotion decider. Bryne, leading the league by a single point, needed a win to secure their position. The match, witnessed by a crowd of over 12,000 spectators, ended in a 1–0 victory for Bryne, with Nils Steinsland scoring the decisive goal through a header midway through the first half.

The season concluded the following weekend with Bryne hosting Hødd. A commanding 3–0 victory sealed the team's promotion. Bryne finished the season with 32 points from 18 games, achieving 15 wins, 2 draws, and only 1 loss, with an impressive goal difference of 41–10. Vard Haugesund finished second with 29 points and earned promotion through qualification matches.

=== Years in top tier and cup win (1976–1987) ===
Bryne had a successful run in the 1970s and 1980s. In the first season of the top division in 1976, Gustav Hult served as coach and managed to keep the team in the league, finishing 9th. The following three seasons were led by Kjell Schou-Andreassen, who had previously achieved success with Viking and as a national team coach. Under his leadership, Bryne steadily improved and finished in 4th place in the league in 1979, just two points behind the bronze medal position.

In 1980, Englishman Brian Green took over as coach and brought with him a new training and football philosophy that emphasized lighter training sessions and more ball play. He led Bryne to two silver medals in the league in 1980 and 1982 and subsequent European Cup appearances. While Green played a significant role in these successes, it was built upon the foundation laid by Schou-Andreassen in the previous years.

In 1983, Kent Karlsson from Sweden took over as coach and led the team for three seasons, achieving a 4th place finish in the league in 1984.

Before the 1986 season, Bjarne Berntsen was appointed as the new coach on a long-term contract. In his first year, Bryne finished 6th in the league and made it to the 4th round of the cup. The following year, the team seemed poised for great success, with three rounds left in the league they were still in contention for the title and had already secured a place in the cup final. However, they faltered in the last few matches and ultimately finished in 5th place behind Moss, Molde, Kongsvinger, and Rosenborg.

After trailing 0–2 against Rosenborg in the semi-finals of the cup at Lerkendal, Bryne managed to turn the game in their favor. Bryne eventually won 2–3 and the club was ready for their first cup final.

Their opponent was Brann, and Bryne lost the draw for jersey colors, and had to play with white tops. The game ended 0–0 after regular time. The first extra time was almost over when Bryne defender Kolbjørn Ekker put the ball behind Brann goalkeeper Bjarni Sigurðsson. The second extra time ended goalless and Bryne could celebrate the club's first title in its 61-year history.

=== Relegation from top tier (1988–1998) ===
1988 turned out to be a disastrous year. The reigning cup champions were knocked out in the third round. There was also relegation from Eliteserien after a qualification match against Start. The match was played at Stavanger Stadion with thousands of Viking fans in the stands dressed in yellow and black, as Bryne Stadium was under renovation. Although Berntsen had a long-term contract, his coaching engagement was terminated after the 1988 season.

In 1989, Arne Larsen Økland was hired as coach, with Trond Sirevåg as assistant coach. Although neither of them had extensive coaching experience, it was expected that with their playing experience and experience from several talented coaches, they would be a good choice. The season was reasonably good, almost earning a qualification spot. The same two continued into the following season, which resulted in a qualification spot, but with a loss to Lillestrøm in the final qualifying match, and remained in the 1. divisjon.

There was now a change of coach, with Kjell Tennfjord being hired. He had coaching experience from the Eliteserien. Trond Sirevåg continued as assistant coach. This duo coached the team in 1991 and 1992, with a qualification spot in 1991 being the best result. However, a loss to Brann in the final and decisive match meant they missed out. In 1993, there was another change of coach, with Gary Goodchild being appointed with Birk Engstrøm as assistant coach. They achieved a qualification spot, but again lost in the final and decisive match away against Strømsgodset. After this season, some key players left. The following season Bryne gained few points, and towards the end of the season they were close to relegation. The coach and assistant coach were replaced, with Trond Sirevåg becoming the head coach and Tor Fosse the assistant coach. The place in the division was saved in the final match against Vidar in Stavanger. Trond Sirevåg continued in 1995 and 1996, the first year with Geir Olsen and Svein Enersen as assistant coaches and the last year with Geir Olsen as assistant coach. The first year was not particularly successful, but in 1996, they achieved a 3rd place, one spot below qualification.

In 1997, it was time for a new foreigner, Kenneth Rosén was appointed as coach, having experience from a relatively high level both in Sweden and Norway. Rosèn stayed at Bryne until the end of the 2000 season. During his time there, Rosèn achieved good results. The first season was a bit mixed, with the team being close to both the qualifying and relegation places. The second season was a bit better, with the team doing well until August, when they suffered a collapse and ended up in the lower half of the table.

=== Return to top tier and cup final loss (1999–2001) ===
1999 was a successful year, with Bryne being promoted to Eliteserien after an absence of 11 years. The spring season was average, but the fall season was better, securing the team a second-place finish in a dramatic match against Lyn at home. The second-place finish gave Bryne direct promotion to Eliteserien. The first season in Eliteserien was challenging for Bryne. The team was expected to lose from the start and throughout the season, but managed to avoid relegation in the last match against Odd at home.

Before the 2001 season, Rosèn left Bryne and Erik Brakstad was hired as the new coach. Brakstad was an experienced coach with good results from Eliteserien, and optimism was high. However, it was a troubled season in many ways, and Brakstad left the club before the halfway point. Assistant coach Hans Olav Frette took over together with former Bryne player Gabriel Høyland, until the Swede Reine Almqvist with coaching experience from both Norway and Sweden was hired. Hans Olav Frette continued as assistant coach.

The season was a struggle, with the club being a bottom team for most of the year. It was not until the last match of the season that they secured a place in the qualification round, and through the qualification, they secured a spot in Eliteserien. However, the team did much better in the cup competition, reaching the final, which they lost 3–0 to Viking.

=== Return to second tier (2002–2015) ===
Almqvist continued as coach in 2002 and 2003. The first of these years was good, with a 9th place finish in Eliteserien and reaching the 4th round of the cup. The 2003 season was another disaster, with the team not winning any away matches, finishing last in Eliteserien and being knocked out in the 3rd round of the cup. This meant another relegation from Eliteserien after four seasons.

Hans Olav Frette took over as head coach in 2004 with Asle Andersen and Gabriel Høyland as assistants. The team started with a clean slate and many new local players. They were reasonably satisfied with a 7th place finish in the league and reaching the quarterfinals of the cup. Frette continued as coach with Andersen as assistant in 2005, resulting in a 5th place finish in the league and reaching the 4th round of the cup. After this season, Frette resigned and a new Swede, Magnus Johanson, took over as coach, with Andersen continuing as assistant. He was later replaced by Kenneth Eidsaunet during the season. The season resulted in a 3rd place finish and a qualification round for Eliteserien, as well as reaching the 4th round of the cup. However, they lost both qualification matches against Odd.

The 2007 season did not go as expected. Coach Magnus Johannson resigned after the spring season, and Hans Olav Frette took over. Kenneth Eidsaunet continued as assistant coach. The team ended up in 6th place in the league and reached the 3rd round of the cup.

Before the 2008 season, Rolf Teigen was hired as coach, with Mathias Haugaasen as analyst and assistant, Erik Fuglestad as player developer, and Kurt Hegre as goalkeeper coach. Despite the investment, the season was not successful. The team finished 11th in the league and reached the 3rd place in the cup.

The 2009 season began with the same coaching team. After a poor start with lackluster results (last place) and dull play, the coaching duo of Teigen and Haugaasen were dismissed in May. During a transitional period, the team was led by Trond Sirevåg and Gabriel Høyland. Mons Ivar Mjelde was hired as head coach in August, with Øystein Tveit as assistant coach. After Mons Ivar Mjelde's arrival, the team gained momentum and steadily collected points, eventually finishing in 8th place. In the cup, they were eliminated in the 4th round after beating Viking in a dramatic 3rd round match that was decided on penalties. Mons Ivar Mjelde's role as coach ended after the end of the season.

Before the 2010 season, former Bryne player Tommy Bergersen was hired as head coach, with Erik Fuglestad as assistant coach and Kurt Hegre as goalkeeper coach. Since Bergersen lacked coaching experience in the top divisions and had limited financial resources at his disposal, expectations for the season were not too high. The season started well, but as time went on, the team struggled to collect points. They were in the relegation battle throughout the autumn, but some late wins secured a safe 9th place finish.

=== Relegation from second tier and return (2016–present) ===
The 2016 season can be described as extremely turbulent. During this time, the academy player Erling Haaland was promoted to the first team and played 16 games, emerging as a positive contributor to the team's performance. After six points in six games, head coach Gaute Larsen was released from his contract. In came Alf Ingve Berntsen. Berntsen led the team in nine games, during which the team picked up five points. Berntsen resigned and was replaced by Ole Hjelmhaug and assistant coach Even Sel. By that time, the team had played 15 games and had only accumulated 11 points. The summer transfer window offered two solid reinforcements. Bajram Ajeti and Marius Helle resolved what had been the team's Achilles' heel throughout the season, namely scoring goals. In addition, Marius Lode was once again ready to play after being banned for illegal use of methylphenidate.

Despite being written off, Bryne fought to stay in the 1. divisjon until the very end. But when the referee blew the final whistle on the final match of the season on 30 October at home against Fredrikstad, relegation was a fact. For the first time since 1973, Bryne was outside of the elite company of the top two levels of Norwegian football.

Ole Hjelmhaug remained as Bryne coach until the end of the 2018 season, but failed to secure promotion. Ahead of the 2019 season, he was replaced by Jan Halvor Halvorsen, while Even Sel continued as assistant coach. Halvorsen initiated a squad overhaul and implemented a 4–3–3 formation, which led to significant changes in the team's dynamics. However, Bryne's performance in the 2019 season was far from satisfactory, and they ended up in a disappointing 10th place with only 28 points.

The COVID-19 pandemic caused a delay in the 2020 league season, eventually leading to an abbreviated season with a single round-robin system followed by a play-off. Bryne emerged as champions, finishing 7 points clear of the second-place team. They managed to win all their home games, securing their promotion to the second tier after spending four seasons in the third tier. Halvorsen continued as coach for the following season, successfully securing a place in the second tier with a 10th place finish. Upon the expiry of Halvorsen's contract ahead of the 2021 season, Kevin Knappen was appointed as his replacement.

Bryne concluded the 2024 season by achieving direct promotion to the Eliteserien. Although their early form was inconsistent, a run of crucial victories during the summer propelled the club into a strong position in the league table. Defensive stability and steady goal-scoring proved decisive in sustaining their momentum through the final rounds of competition.

Promotion was officially secured on 2 November in a home win against local rivals Egersunds IK, a result that guaranteed Bryne second place in the table.

Bryne has spent a total of 17 seasons in the top flight of Norwegian football since their debut in 1976. Their longest spell was 13 consecutive top tier seasons, from 1976 until 1988. The club's last period in the top division lasted for four seasons from 2000 until the 2003 season.

== Stadium ==
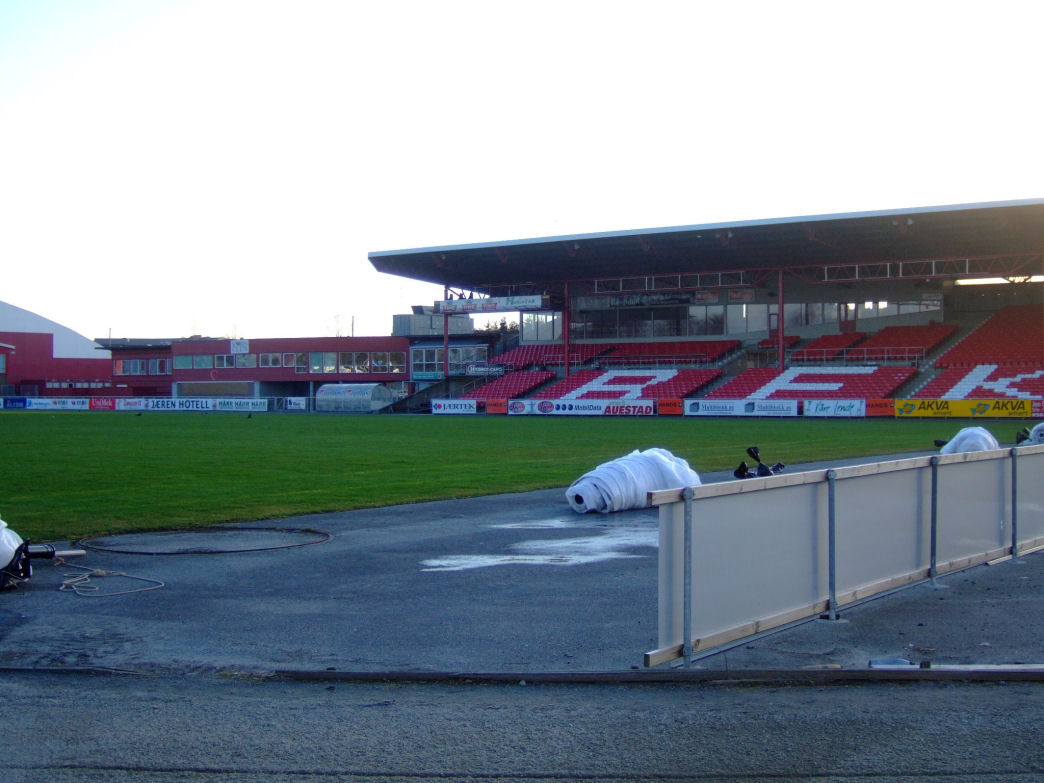
Bryne Stadion

Bryne Stadion currently has a capacity of 4,000, out of which 2,507 are seating arrangements. The record attendance for the stadium was on 26 May 1980, when Bryne defeated Viking, and 13,621 paying spectators were in attendance. However, an earlier game between the two rivals on 9 October 1977 was estimated to have been witnessed by as many as 14,500 individuals. Although the club considers 13,621 to be the official record, as the earlier fixture had only 12,236 paying spectators.

In recent years, Bryne has been exploring the possibility of redeveloping their home ground or constructing a new stadium elsewhere to increase revenue and comply with the Norwegian Football Association's regulations for hosting top-tier football matches. On 14 February 2006, the club unveiled plans for the Jæren Arena, an 8,688-capacity stadium designed by the same architects who created Viking Stadion. The project was estimated to cost 150 million NOK, and on 12 December 2006, the club announced that it had secured financing for the stadium.

Initially, the stadium was planned to be located on the border between Time and Klepp. However, obtaining a construction permit for the site proved difficult due to its agricultural zoning, and the club eventually settled for a new location approximately 900 meters south of the current stadium. Bryne intended to have the stadium completed in time for the 2008 season, but unfortunately, the project hit a snag in 2010 when developer Jæren Arena AS went bankrupt, and the plans were abandoned. As a result, Bryne is currently planning to redevelop their current stadium.

== European Cup appearances ==
Season	Competition	Round	Country	Club	Home	Away	Aggregate
1981–82	UEFA Cup	First round	(Belgium)	KFC Winterslag	0–2	2–1	2–3
1983–84	UEFA Cup	First round	(Belgium)	Anderlecht	0–3	1–1	1–4
1988–89	Cup Winners' Cup	Preliminary round	(Hungary)	Békéscsaba Előre SSC	0–3	2–1	2–4

== Honours ==
- Norwegian top flight:
  - Runners-up (2): 1980, 1982
- Norwegian Cup:
  - Winners (1): 1987
  - Runners-up (1): 2001

== Records ==
- Greatest home victory: 7–0 vs. Bodø/Glimt, 5 October 1980
- Greatest away victory: 5–2 vs. Fredrikstad, 22 August 1976
- Heaviest home loss: 0–5 vs. Lillestrøm, 8 July 2001
- Heaviest away loss: 0–9 vs. Rosenborg, 15 October 2000
- Highest attendance, Bryne Stadion: 13,621 vs. Viking, 26 May 1980
- Highest average attendance, season: 6,283, 1977
- Most appearances, total: 596, Gabriel Høyland 1970–1986
- Most appearances, league: 227, Gabriel Høyland 1970–1986
- Most goals scored, total: 274, Johannes Vold 1961–1970
- Most goals scored, league: 59, Arne Larsen Økland 1980–1987

== Recent history ==
Season		Pos.	Pl.	W	D	L	GS	GA	P	Cup	Notes
2000	Tippeligaen	11	26	7	6	13	32	60	27	Third round	
2001	Tippeligaen	12	26	6	4	16	33	61	22	Final	Avoided relegation through playoffs
2002	Tippeligaen	9	26	8	7	11	38	39	31	Fourth round	
2003	Tippeligaen	↓ 14	26	7	1	18	35	56	22	Third round	Relegated to the 1. divisjon
2004	1. divisjon	7	30	11	9	10	54	45	42	Quarter-final	
2005	1. divisjon	5	30	14	8	8	55	33	50	Fourth round	
2006	1. divisjon	3	30	14	10	6	52	44	52	Fourth round	
2007	1. divisjon	6	30	14	7	9	57	38	49	Third round	
2008	1. divisjon	11	30	10	6	14	38	53	36	Third round	
2009	1. divisjon	8	30	10	10	10	41	39	40	Fourth round	
2010	1. divisjon	9	28	10	5	13	57	52	35	Third round	
2011	1. divisjon	9	30	11	11	8	47	36	44	First round	
2012	1. divisjon	10	30	10	8	12	41	53	38	Second round	
2013	1. divisjon	7	30	13	7	10	55	50	46	Fourth round	
2014	1. divisjon	9	30	13	3	14	48	55	42	Second round	
2015	1. divisjon	10	30	10	6	14	43	50	36	Third round	
2016	1. divisjon	↓ 13	30	7	9	14	33	48	30	Second round	Relegated
2017	2. divisjon	3	26	13	8	5	52	37	47	Second round	
2018	2. divisjon	5	26	11	8	7	45	38	41	Quarter-final	
2019	2. divisjon	10	26	7	7	12	30	41	28	Third round	
2020	2. divisjon	↑ 1	19	13	5	1	47	23	44	Cancelled	Promoted
2021	1. divisjon	10	30	11	4	15	44	48	37	Third round	
2022	1. divisjon	11	30	9	8	13	42	52	35	Fourth round	
2023	1. divisjon	6	30	13	5	12	40	36	44	Second round	
2024	1. divisjon	↑ 2	30	18	4	8	50	29	58	Fourth round	Promoted
2025	Eliteserien	↓ 14	30	8	7	15	37	56	31	Fourth round	Relegated to the 1. divisjon through play-offs
2026	1. divisjon	6	30	14	4	12	46	42	46	Quarter-final	

== Players ==
=== Current squad ===
As of 31 August 2026

Note: Flags indicate national team as defined under FIFA eligibility rules; some limited exceptions apply. Players may hold more than one non-FIFA nationality.

No.	Pos.	Nation	Player
1	GK	NOR	Magnus Rugland Ree
2	DF	NOR	Sander Elias Fjelldalselv
3	DF	NOR	Patrick Wik
5	DF	DEN	Jacob Haahr
6	MF	NOR	Remi-André Svindland
7	MF	NOR	Mats Thornes
8	MF	NOR	Lars Erik Sødal
9	FW	NOR	Sjur Jonassen
10	MF	NOR	Kristian Håland
11	FW	KEN	Alfred Scriven
12	GK	NED	Jan de Boer
14	DF	NOR	Anders Molund

No.	Pos.	Nation	Player
15	DF	NOR	Kristoffer Hay
16	DF	GAM	Dadi Gaye
17	DF	NOR	Lasse Qvigstad
18	FW	NOR	Luka Fajfric
19	MF	NOR	Torjus Englebakken
21	MF	NOR	David Aksnes
23	FW	NOR	David Motland
28	FW	NOR	Jaran Eikem Østrem
29	MF	NOR	Martin Åmot Lye
33	DF	NOR	Adrian Røragen Hermansen
77	MF	SWE	Paya Pichkah

=== Out on loan ===
Note: Flags indicate national team as defined under FIFA eligibility rules; some limited exceptions apply. Players may hold more than one non-FIFA nationality.

No.	Pos.	Nation	Player

=== Notable former players ===
Had senior international cap(s) for their respective countries. Players whose name is listed in bold represented their countries while playing for Bryne FK.

- (Democratic Republic of the Congo) Betu
- (Faroe Islands) **Rógvi Baldvinsson**
- (Norway) Bård Borgersen
- (New Zealand) **Kris Bright**
- (Norway) Jonatan Braut Brunes
- (Norway) André Danielsen
- (Nigeria) Prince Efe Ehiorobo
- (Finland) **Anders Eriksson**
- (Norway) Magnus Retsius Grødem
- (Norway) Alf-Inge Haaland
- (Norway) Erling Haaland
- (Lebanon) Adnan Haidar
- (Norway) **Hugo Hansen**
- (Norway) **Nils Ove Hellvik**
- (Norway) Erik Holtan
- (Norway) Kenneth Høie
- (Norway) Jon Inge Høiland
- (Namibia) **Quinton Jacobs**
- (Norway) **Tom Rüsz Jacobsen**
- (Costa Rica) Carlos Johnson
- (Norway) **Ulf Karlsen**
- (Estonia) **Marek Lemsalu**
- (Norway) Marius Lode
- (Kenya) **Bonaventure Maruti**
- (Norway) Mons Ivar Mjelde
- (Norway) Erik Mykland
- (Norway) Roger Nilsen
- (Faroe Islands) **Meinhard Olsen**
- (Norway) **Rune Ottesen**
- (Kenya) **Paul Oyuga**
- (Canada) Chris Pozniak
- (Iceland) Baldur Sigurðsson
- (Norway) Ragnvald Soma
- (Norway) Stefan Strandberg
- (Costa Rica) Daniel Torres
- (Finland) **Ville Väisänen**
- (Norway) **Arne Larsen Økland**

== Coaches ==
- Committee (1926–1929)
- (Norway) Andreas Gabrielsen (1930)
- Committee (1931–1937)
- (Norway) Jens Håland and committee (1938–1939)
- Committee (1940)
- Committee (1945–1947)
- (Norway) Alf Rasmussen and committee (1948–1950)
- Committee (1951–1952)
- (Norway) Einar Jensen and committee (1953)
- (Norway) Inge Paulsen and committee (1954)
- (Norway) Georg Monsen (1955)
- Committee (1956)
- (Norway) Reidar Kvammen (1957)
- Committee (1958–1959)
- (Norway) Reidar Kvammen (1960–1963)
- (Norway) John Larsen (1964–1965)
- (Norway) Reidar Kvammen (1966)
- (Norway) Olav Sigbjørnsen (1967–1968)
- (Norway) Einar Jacobsen (1969)
- (Norway) Olav Sigbjørnsen (1970)
- (Norway) Gunnar Steen (1971–1972)
- (Norway) Gustav Hult (1973)
- (Norway) Claus Ellingsen (1974)
- (Norway) Gustav Hult (1975–1976)
- (Norway) Kjell Schou-Andreassen (1977–1979)
- (England) Brian Green (1980–1982)
- (Sweden) Kent Karlsson (1983–1985)
- (Norway) Bjarne Berntsen (1986–1988)
- (Norway) Arne Larsen Økland (1989–1990)
- (Norway) Kjell Tennfjord (1991–1992)
- (England) Gary Goodchild (1993–1994)
- (Norway) Trond Sirevåg (1994–1996)
- (Sweden) Kenneth Rosén (1997–2000)
- (Norway) Erik Brakstad (2001)
- (Norway) Hans Olav Frette (2001)
- (Norway) Gabriel Høyland (2001)
- (Sweden) Reine Almqvist (2001–2003)
- (Norway) Hans Olav Frette (2004–2005)
- (Sweden) Magnus Johansson (2006–2007)
- (Norway) Hans Olav Frette (2007)
- (Norway) Rolf Teigen (2008–2009)
- (Norway) Trond Sirevåg (2009)
- (Norway) Gabriel Høyland (2009)
- (Norway) Mons Ivar Mjelde (2009)
- (Norway) Tommy Bergersen (2010–2012)
- (Norway) Gaute Larsen (2012–2016)
- (Norway) Alf Ingve Berntsen (2016)
- (Norway) Ole Hjelmhaug (2016–2018)
- (Norway) Jan Halvor Halvorsen (2018–2021)
- (Norway) Kevin Knappen (2022–2025)
