= Sverre Lie (footballer) =

Norwegian footballer (1888-1983)

Personal information
- Date of birth: 8 January 1888
- Date of death: 13 January 1983 (aged 95)

International career
Years	Team	Apps	(Gls)
1908	Norway	1	(0)

Sverre Lie (8 January 1888 – 13 January 1983) was a Norwegian footballer. He played in one match for the Norway national football team in 1908.
