= Kurt Tunheim =

Norwegian footballer (born 1950)

Personal information
- Date of birth: 25 December 1950 (age 75)

International career
Years	Team	Apps	(Gls)
1979	Norway	1	(0)

Kurt Tunheim (born 25 December 1950) is a Norwegian footballer. He played in one match for the Norway national football team in 1979.
