= Folke Kirkemo =

Norwegian footballer (1899-1967)

Personal information
- Date of birth: 28 March 1899
- Date of death: 14 October 1967 (aged 68)

International career
Years	Team	Apps	(Gls)
1925	Norway	1	(0)

Folke Kirkemo (28 March 1899 – 14 October 1967) was a Norwegian footballer. He played in one match for the Norway national football team in 1925.
