= Bjørn Rime =

Norwegian footballer (born 1945)

Personal information
- Date of birth: 18 January 1945 (age 81)
- Position: Defender

Youth career
- –1959: Fagernes
- 1960–1963: Gjøvik-Lyn

Senior career*
Years	Team	Apps	(Gls)
1963–1965	Gjøvik-Lyn		
1966	Nor		
1966–1967	Gjøvik-Lyn		
1968–1977	Rosenborg	123	(3)

International career
1970	Norway	1	(0)

Managerial career
- 1977: Rosenborg
- * Club domestic league appearances and goals

Bjørn Rime (born 18 January 1945) is a Norwegian former football player and coach. He played 130 matches in the Eliteserien; nine seasons with Rosenborg BK and one with SK Gjøvik-Lyn. Being a defender he scored only four goals in these matches. He was capped once for Norway national football team. He was head coach for Rosenborg BK in the 1977 season.

== Career ==
Bjørn Rime grew up in Fagernes and played youth football for Fagernes IL before transferring to SK Gjøvik-Lyn in February 1960. He was selected for a youth national team training camp in 1963. He played for SK Gjøvik-Lyn when the club was in the Norwegian top division in the 1963 season.

In the spring of 1966 Rime played for Nor in Narvik, due to his being stationed in the area for military service. In the latter half of 1966 he featured for Gjøvik-Lyn again, but resided in Oslo and trained with Skeid during the winter break. Gjøvik-Lyn secured his services for 1967 as well.

He came to in Rosenborg in 1968 and quickly became regular as defender. Rime was capped once for Norway national football team in a match versus Iceland in 1971.

Rime was head coach of Rosenborg BK in the 1977 season. Rime now lives in Trondheim, managing a steel company.

== Honours ==
Rosenborg BK

- Norwegian Premier League champion: 1969, 1971,
- Norwegian Premier League runner up: 1970, 1973
- Norwegian Cup win: 1971
- Norwegian Cup runner up: 1972, 1973
