= IK Start =

Norwegian football club

- Full name: Idrettsklubben Start
- Founded: 19 September 1905; 121 years ago
- Ground: Sparebanken Norge Arena Kristiansand; Kristiansand
- Capacity: 14,563
- Head coach: Azar Karadas
- League: Eliteserien
- 2025: First Division, 2nd of 16 (promoted)
- Website: www.ikstart.no
Home colours	Away colours

Idrettsklubben Start (or simply IK Start) is a Norwegian football club from the city of Kristiansand that currently plays in the Eliteserien, the top tier of the Norwegian football league system. The club was founded on 19 September 1905. The club's current head coach is Azar Karadas. The team plays in yellow jerseys, black shorts and socks at home, and black jerseys, yellow shorts and socks away.

They play their home matches at Sør Arena, opened in 2007. Before moving to Sør Arena, IK Start played their games at Kristiansand Stadion. The team’s official supporter club, “Tigerberget,” existed until 2017, when the IK Start board decided to discontinue having an official supporter club.

== History ==
Start were Norwegian champions in 1978 and 1980. They participated in the European Cup in 1979 and 1981, as well as being qualified for the UEFA Champions League 2006–07. The years since 1995 have been turbulent, but recent investments have given greater expectations for the future. In 2004 they won the Norwegian 1. division and were promoted to the top flight.

In 2005 they reached second place, following Vålerenga, after a strong comeback season in the Tippeligaen. For this, Start earned a place in the UEFA Cup 2006.

In 2006, after beating Skála of the Faroe Islands in the first qualifying round of the UEFA Cup, and Drogheda United of Ireland in the second qualifying round (after penalties), they reached the first round of the UEFA Cup, where they were knocked out by Ajax of the Netherlands.

2007 was a bad year for Start, with problems working as a team and management issues. It led to a disappointing 13th place, leading to Start's relegation to 1. divisjon. In 2008 the club got financial problems. The local government saved the club from bankruptcy. The financial difficulties has plagued Start for several seasons, due to the financial crisis and the Norwegian footballteams overspending, Start being no exception. The last couple of seasons, Start has downsized and saved money, for example by changing the turf on Sør Arena, the hopes being that the savings will keep the wheels turning in Start.

Ahead of the 2009 season, Knut Tørum was appointed head coach of Start. The next two seasons, Start was positioned at the lower half of Tippeligaen although achieving some strong results, like being the only team to beat Rosenborg in 2009, at Rosenborgs homeground Lerkendal, delaying their gold celebration. On 22 June 2011, Start had 13 points in 12 matches, and Tørum decided to resign hours before a cup-match against Strømsgodset, a match Start won without Tørum. Mons Ivar Mjelde replaced Tørum as head coach, but was not able to save Start from relegation. Start started the 2012 1. divisjon in strong fashion, leading the division and winning important matches and won promotion at the end of the season.

Start defeated Stabæk 4–1 on 4 July 2015. From 12 July 2015 to 18 September 2016, Start played 39 consecutive games without a win in Tippeligaen. This is the longest run without winning a single game across any top division in Europe.

== Badge ==
Former logo of IK Start, used between 2018 and 2021.

Since the club was founded in 1905, the club badge had been a blue and white pennant. In November 2017, the badge was replaced with a more modernised version in all black. The new crest was in use for four years, before Start decided to return to the old one in March 2022.

== Honours ==
- Eliteserien:
  - Winners (2): 1978, 1980
  - Runners-up (1): 2005
  - Third place (7): 1973, 1975, 1979, 1983, 1984, 1991, 1992
- Norwegian Cup:
  - Semi finalist (7): 1975, 1978, 1988, 2000, 2006, 2011, 2018
- 1. divisjon:
  - Winners (4): 1968, 1972, 2004, 2012
  - Promotion: 1958–59, 1988, 1999, 2001, 2008, 2017

== Recent history ==
Season		Pos.	Pl.	W	D	L	GS	GA	P	Cup	Notes
2002	Tippeligaen	↓ 14	26	2	5	19	21	72	11	Fourth round	Relegated to the 1. divisjon
2003	1. divisjon	9	30	12	4	14	53	50	40	Third round	
2004	1. divisjon	↑ 1	30	24	2	4	71	28	74	Third round	Promoted to the Tippeligaen
2005	Tippeligaen	2	26	13	6	7	47	35	45	Fourth round	
2006	Tippeligaen	6	26	10	7	9	29	32	37	Semi-final	
2007	Tippeligaen	↓ 13	26	6	8	12	34	44	26	Fourth round	Relegated to the 1. divisjon
2008	1. divisjon	↑ 3	30	17	8	5	58	34	59	Fourth round	Promoted to the Tippeligaen
2009	Tippeligaen	9	30	10	10	10	46	52	40	Third round	
2010	Tippeligaen	8	30	11	9	10	57	60	42	Quarter-final	
2011	Tippeligaen	↓ 15	30	7	5	18	39	61	26	Semi-final	Relegated to the 1. divisjon
2012	1. divisjon	↑ 1	30	20	6	4	71	35	66	Fourth round	Promoted to the Tippeligaen
2013	Tippeligaen	9	30	10	8	12	43	46	38	Quarter-final	
2014	Tippeligaen	12	30	10	5	15	47	60	35	Fourth round	
2015	Tippeligaen	14	30	5	7	18	35	64	22	Second round	
2016	Tippeligaen	↓ 16	30	2	10	18	23	59	16	Third round	Relegated to the 1. divisjon
2017	1. divisjon	↑ 2	30	16	7	7	57	36	55	Second round	Promoted to the Eliteserien
2018	Eliteserien	↓ 15	30	8	5	17	30	54	29	Semi-final	Relegated to the 1. divisjon
2019	1. divisjon	↑ 3	30	19	5	6	54	31	62	First round	Promoted to the Eliteserien
2020	Eliteserien	↓ 15	30	6	9	15	33	56	27	Cancelled	Relegated to the 1. divisjon
2021	1. divisjon	9	30	10	8	12	59	59	38	Fourth round	
2022	1. divisjon	3	30	16	6	8	63	38	54	Fourth round	
2023	1. divisjon	5	30	12	10	8	49	30	46	Third round	
2024	1. divisjon	12	30	9	8	13	45	57	35	First round	
2025	1. divisjon	↑ 2	30	16	7	7	58	35	55	Second round	Promoted to the Eliteserien
2026 (in progress)	Eliteserien	16	27	6	4	17	29	60	22	Second round	

== Current squad ==
As of 31 August 2026

Note: Flags indicate national team as defined under FIFA eligibility rules; some limited exceptions apply. Players may hold more than one non-FIFA nationality.

No.	Pos.	Nation	Player
2	DF	NOR	Fredrik Pålerud
3	DF	NOR	Altin Ujkani
4	DF	DEN	Johan Meyer
5	DF	NOR	Sander Aske Granheim
6	DF	NOR	John Olav Norheim
8	FW	SRB	Nikola Jojić
9	FW	CYP	Nikolas Koutsakos
10	MF	CMR	Stève Mvoué
11	MF	NOR	Eirik Schulze (captain)
12	DF	NOR	Deni Dashaev
13	DF	GER	Sebastian Griesbeck
15	MF	NOR	Marius Nordal

No.	Pos.	Nation	Player
17	FW	DEN	Jesper Cornelius
18	MF	NOR	Mikael Ugland
19	DF	NOR	Kristoffer Tønnessen
20	FW	NOR	Håkon Lorentzen
23	MF	NOR	Erlend Segberg
24	GK	NOR	Storm Strand-Kolbjørnsen
26	GK	NOR	Magnus Sjøeng (on loan from Vålerenga)
27	DF	NOR	Ousmane Diallo Toure
28	DF	NOR	Jens Husebø
29	DF	NOR	Erlend Dahl Reitan
35	FW	SWE	Santino Samuyiwa
45	GK	SRB	Filip Manojlović (on loan from Djurgården)

=== Out on loan ===
Note: Flags indicate national team as defined under FIFA eligibility rules; some limited exceptions apply. Players may hold more than one non-FIFA nationality.

No.	Pos.	Nation	Player
1	GK	DEN	Jacob Pryts (at Sarpsborg 08 until 31 December 2026)
7	FW	NOR	Alexander Gurendal (at Hønefoss until 30 November 2026)
25	FW	NGR	Terry Benjamin (at Strømmen until 30 November 2026)

No.	Pos.	Nation	Player
21	FW	NOR	Felix Kutsche Eriksen (at Ull/Kisa until 30 November 2026)
31	MF	NOR	Jonas Seim (at Pors until 31 December 2026)
30	MF	NOR	Lukas Gausdal (at Sogndal Fotball until 30 November 2026)

=== Coaching staff ===
Position	Name
Head coach	(Norway) Azar Karadas
Assistant coach	(Iceland) Jóhannes Harðarson
Goalkeeping coach	(Norway) Alexander Aaser
Fitness coach	(Norway) Kristian Gjøstøl
Sports coordinator	(Norway) Øyvind Evjen
Head of Physio	(Norway) Jørgen Rostrup
Analysist	(Norway) Kristoffer Vangen Lysgård

=== Former head coaches ===
IK Start coaching history from 1947 to present
- Håkon Hertzberg (1947–48)
- Karsten Johannessen (1 Jan 1954 – Dec 31, 1955)
- Håkon Hertzberg (1956) ·
- Karsten Johannessen (1 Jan 1957 – Dec 31, 1957)
- Håkon Hertzberg (1958–60)
- Karsten Johannessen (1 Jan 1961 – Dec 31, 1961)
- Håkon Hertzberg (1966)
- Karsten Johannessen (1 Jan 1967 – 1968)
- Kjell B. Petersen (1968-69)
- Karl Durspekt (1970)
- Karsten Johannessen (1 Jan 1971 – Dec 31, 1974)
- Tor Røste Fossen (1975–77)
- Karsten Johannessen (1 Jan 1978 – Dec 31, 1981)
- Svein Hammerø (1982) ·
- Karsten Johannessen (1 Jan 1985 – Dec 31, 1985)
- Brian Green (1986–87)
- Karsten Johannessen (1988 – Dec 31, 1989)
- Steve Perryman (1995)
- Teddy Moen (1 Jan 1996 – July 7, 1996)
- Karsten Johannessen (8 July 1996 – Dec 31, 1996)
- Jan Halvor Halvorsen (1 Jan 1999 – June 30, 2002)
- Guðjón Þórðarson (1 July 2002 – Dec 31, 2002)
- Bård Wiggen (2003)
- Tom Nordlie (1 Jan 2004 – July 14, 2006)
- Stig Inge Bjørnebye (15 July 2006 – Sept 5, 2007)
- Benny Lennartsson (Sept 9, 2007 – Dec 31, 2007)
- Arne Sandstø (1 Jan 2008 – Dec 31, 2008)
- Knut Tørum (1 Jan 2009 – July 9, 2011)
- Mons Ivar Mjelde (10 July 2011 – Sept 4, 2015)
- Bård Borgersen (Sept 4, 2015 – Dec 31, 2015)
- Steinar Pedersen (1 Jan 2016 – Sep 29, 2017)
- Mick Priest (30 Sep 2017 – Dec 1, 2017)
- Mark Dempsey (1 Dec 2017 – May 18, 2018)
- Mick Priest (18 May 2018 – 1 June 2018)
- Kjetil Rekdal (1 June 2018 – 2 April 2019)
- Jóhannes Harðarson (2 April 2019 – 14 June 2021)
- Sindre Tjelmeland (14 June 2021 – 9 January 2024)
- Azar Karadas (8 February 2024 – )

== European record ==
Season	Competition	Round	Club	Home	Away	Agg.
1974–75	UEFA Cup	First round	(Sweden) Djurgården	1–2	0–5	1–7
1976–77	UEFA Cup	First round	(Austria) Wacker Innsbruck	0–5	1–2	1–7
1977–78	UEFA Cup	First round	(Iceland) Fram	6–0	2–0	8–0
1977–78	UEFA Cup	Second round	(Germany) Eintracht Braunschweig	1–0	0–4	1–4
1978–79	UEFA Cup	First round	(Denmark) Esbjerg	0–0	0–1	0–1
1979–80	European Cup	First round	(France) Strasbourg	1–2	0–4	1–6
1981–82	European Cup	First round	(Netherlands) AZ	1–3	0–1	1–4
2006–07	UEFA Cup	First qualifying round	(Faroe Islands) Skála	3–0	1–0	4–0
2006–07	UEFA Cup	Second qualifying round	(Republic of Ireland) Drogheda United	1–0	0–1	1–1 (11–10 (p))
2006–07	UEFA Cup	First round	(Netherlands) Ajax	2–5	0–4	2–9
