= 1986 Norwegian Football Cup final =

- Event: 1986 Norwegian Football Cup
Tromsø	Lillestrøm
4	1
- Date: 26 October 1986
- Venue: Ullevaal Stadion, Oslo
- Referee: Egil Nervik
- Attendance: 22,000

The 1986 Norwegian Football Cup final was the final match of the 1986 Norwegian Football Cup, the 81st season of the Norwegian Football Cup, the premier Norwegian football cup competition organized by the Football Association of Norway (NFF). The match was played on 26 October 1986 at the Ullevaal Stadion in Oslo, and opposed two First Division sides Tromsø and Lillestrøm. Tromsø defeated Lillestrøm 4–1 to claim the Norwegian Cup for a first time in their history.

== Route to the final ==
Tromsø			Round	Lillestrøm		
Skarp	H	3–0	Round 1	Jevnaker	A	5–0
Vardø	A	2–0	Round 2	Teie	H	3–0
Mjølner	H	2–2 (4–2 p)	Round 3	Lyn	H	5–1
HamKam	A	2–1 aet	Round 4	Hødd	A	2–0
Start	H	2–1	Quarterfinal	Kongsvinger	H	1–0
Djerv 1919	A	1–0	Semifinal	Rosenborg	H	2–0

== Match ==
=== Details ===
26 October 1986
13:15 CET (UTC+1)

Tromsø	4–1	Lillestrøm
Solstad 2'; Espejord 7'; Jenssen 65'; Rismo 74'	Report	Bjerkeland 50'

Ullevaal Stadion, Oslo
Attendance: 22,000
Referee: Egil Nervik (Freidig)

Tromsø:
GK	(Norway) Bjarte Flem	(substituted off) 89'
DF	(Norway) Nils Solstad
DF	(Norway) Tore Nilsen
DF	(Norway) Tor Pedersen
DF	(Norway) Trond Steinar Albertsen
MF	(Norway) Truls Jenssen
MF	(Norway) Lars Espejord
MF	(Norway) Tore Rismo
MF	(Norway) Sigmund Forfang
FW	(Norway) Trond Johansen
FW	(Norway) Per-Mathias Høgmo	(substituted off) 87'
Substitutions:
GK	(Norway) Gunnar Gamst	(substituted in) 89'
DF	(Norway) Lars Bang
DF	(Norway) Yngvar Bendiksen	(substituted in) 87'
FW	(Norway) Eivind Andreassen
FW	(Norway) Jan Nilsen
Coach:
(Norway) Dagfinn Rognmo

Lillestrøm:
GK	(Norway) Arne Amundsen
DF	(Norway) Ole Dyrstad
DF	(Norway) Tor Inge Smedås
DF	(Norway) Bård Bjerkeland
DF	(Norway) Gunnar Halle
MF	(Norway) Rune Richardsen
MF	(Norway) Kjetil Osvold
MF	(Norway) Tom Sundby
MF	(Norway) Bjarne Sognnæs
FW	(Norway) Sten Glenn Håberg
FW	(Norway) André Krogsæter
Coach:
(Norway) Tom Lund
