= List of Norwegian Football Cup finals =

List of Norwegian Football Cup champions. Clubs from Northern Norway were not allowed to participate in the Norwegian Football Cup until 1963.

== List ==
Year	Winner	Score	Runner-up	Date	Venue	Attendance	Ref
1902	Grane	2–0	Odd	16 June	Gamle Frogner Stadion, Kristiania (Oslo)	—	
1903	Odd	1–0	Grane	22 September	Gamle Frogner Stadion, Kristiania (Oslo)	—	
1904	Odd	4–0	Porsgrund	4 September	Sportsplassen, Skien	800	
1905	Odd	2–1	Akademisk	10 September	Gamle Frogner Stadion, Kristiania (Oslo)	3,000	
1906	Odd	1–0	Sarpsborg	9 September	Gamle Frogner Stadion, Kristiania (Oslo)	—	
1907	Mercantile	3–0	Sarpsborg	22 September	Nedre Frednes Stadion, Porsgrunn	4,000	
1908	Lyn	3–2	Odd	13 September	Gamle Frogner Stadion, Kristiania (Oslo)	—	
1909	Lyn	4–3 (aet)	Odd	26 September	Gamle Frogner Stadion, Kristiania (Oslo)	—	
1910	Lyn	4–2	Odd	25 September	Gamle Frogner Stadion, Kristiania (Oslo)	5,000	
1911	Lyn	5–2	Urædd	8 October	Gamle Frogner stadion, Kristiania (Oslo)	5,000	
1912	Mercantile	6–0	Fram Larvik	20 October	Gamle Frogner Stadion, Kristiania (Oslo)	2,000	
1913	Odd	2–1	Mercantile	13 October	Urædd Stadion, Porsgrunn	10,000	
1914	Frigg	4–2	Gjøvik/Lyn	11 October	Frogner Stadion, Kristiania (Oslo)	10,000	
1915	Odd	2–1	Kvik	10 October	Sarpsborg Stadion, Sarpsborg	6,000	
1916	Frigg	2–0	Ørn	8 October	Øya Stadion, Trondhjem (Trondheim)	4,000	
1917	Sarpsborg	4–1	Brann	14 October	Stavanger Stadion, Stavanger	10,000	
1918	Kvik	4–0	Brann	13 October	Marienlyst Stadion, Drammen	12,000	
1919	Odd	1–0	Frigg	12 October	Fram Sportsplass, Larvik	10,000	
1920	Ørn	1–0	Frigg	17 October	Gressbanen, Kristiania (Oslo)	14,000	
1921	Frigg	2–0	Odd	17 October	Gressbanen, Kristiania (Oslo)	20,000	
1922	Odd	5–1	Kvik	15 October	Brann Stadion, Bergen	8,000	
1923	Brann	2–1	Lyn	14 October	Odds Gressbane, Skien	8,000	
1924	Odd	3–0	Mjøndalen	2 October	Sorgenfri Stadion, Trondhjem (Trondheim)	7,000	
1925	Brann	3–0	Sarpsborg	18 October	Fredrikstad Stadion, Fredrikstad	10,000	
1926	Odd	3–0	Ørn	17 October	Ullevaal Stadion, Oslo	16,000	
1927	Ørn	4–0	Drafn	16 October	Sandefjord Stadion, Sandefjord	—	
1928	Ørn	2–1	Lyn	14 October	Halden Stadion, Halden	6,717	
1929	Sarpsborg	2–1 (aet)	Ørn	20 October	Stavanger Stadion, Stavanger	13,000	
1930	Ørn	4–2	Drammen	19 October	Brann Stadion, Bergen	6,000	
1931	Odd	3–1	Mjøndalen	18 October	Lovisenlund Idrettsplass, Larvik	13,000	
1932	Fredrikstad	6–1	Ørn	16 October	Marienlyst Stadion, Drammen	17,000	
1933	Mjøndalen	3–1	Viking	15 October	Ullevaal Stadion, Oslo	23,000	
1934	Mjøndalen	2–1 (aet)	Sarpsborg	14 October	Sorgenfri Stadion, Trondheim	8,000	
1935	Fredrikstad	4–0	Sarpsborg	20 October	Sarpsborg Stadion, Sarpsborg	15,200	
1936	Fredrikstad	2–0	Mjøndalen	25 October	Ullevaal Stadion, Oslo	20,000	
1937	Mjøndalen	4–2	Odd	17 October	Urædd Stadion, Porsgrunn	17,000	
1938	Fredrikstad	3–2 (aet)	Mjøndalen	16 October	Briskeby Gressbane, Hamar	12,000	
1939	Sarpsborg	2–1	Skeid	15 October	Tønsberg Gressbane, Tønsberg	8,000	
1940	Fredrikstad	3–0	Skeid	15 October	Ullevaal Stadion, Oslo	30,000	
1945	Lyn	1–1 (aet); 1–1 (aet); 4–0	Fredrikstad	14 October; 28 October; 5 November	Ullevaal stadion, Oslo; Sarpsborg Stadion, Sarpsborg; Bislett Stadion, Oslo	34,162; 18,000; 31,412	
1946	Lyn	3–2 (aet)	Fredrikstad	15 October	Ullevaal Stadion, Oslo	35,000	
1947	Skeid	2–0	Viking	19 October	Brann Stadion, Bergen	35,000	
1948	Sarpsborg	1–0	Fredrikstad	17 October	Ullevaal Stadion, Oslo	35,000	
1949	Sarpsborg	3–1	Skeid	23 October	Ullevaal Stadion, Oslo	36,000	
1950	Fredrikstad	3–0	Brann	22 October	Ullevaal Stadion, Oslo	35,367	
1951	Sarpsborg	3–2 (aet)	Asker	21 October	Ullevaal Stadion, Oslo	30,639	
1952	Sparta	3–2	Solberg	26 October	Ullevaal Stadion, Oslo	30,639	
1953	Viking	2–1	Lillestrøm	25 October	Ullevaal Stadion, Oslo	31,102	
1954	Skeid	3–0	Fredrikstad	24 October	Ullevaal Stadion, Oslo	34,794	
1955	Skeid	5–0	Lillestrøm	23 October	Ullevaal stadion, Oslo	33,825	
1956	Skeid	2–1	Larvik Turn	21 October	Ullevaal Stadion, Oslo	33,444	
1957	Fredrikstad	4–0	Sandefjord	20 October	Ullevaal Stadion, Oslo	33,073	
1958	Skeid	1–0	Lillestrøm	19 October	Ullevaal Stadion, Oslo	32,579	
1959	Viking	2–1 (aet)	Sandefjord	25 October	Ullevaal Stadion, Oslo	28,195	
1960	Rosenborg	3–3 (aet); 3–2 (aet)	Odd	23 October; 30 October	Ullevaal Stadion, Oslo	31,135; 29,743	
1961	Fredrikstad	7–0	Haugar	22 October	Ullevaal Stadion, Oslo	30,273	
1962	Gjøvik/Lyn	2–0	Vard	28 October	Ullevaal Stadion, Oslo	31,157	
1963	Skeid	2–1 (aet)	Fredrikstad	27 October	Ullevaal Stadion, Oslo	31,444	
1964	Rosenborg BK	2–1	Sarpsborg	25 October	Ullevaal Stadion, Oslo	24,665	
1965	Skeid	2–2 (aet); 1–1 (aet); 2–1	Frigg	24 October; 31 October; 7 November	Ullevaal stadion, Oslo	18,821; 8,826; 8,990	
1966	Fredrikstad	3–2	Lyn	30 October	Ullevaal Stadion, Oslo	30,335	
1967	Lyn	4–1	Rosenborg BK	29 October	Ullevaal Stadion, Oslo	27,389	
1968	Lyn	3–0	Mjøndalen	27 October	Ullevaal Stadion, Oslo	21,101	
1969	Strømsgodset	2–2 (aet); 5–3	Fredrikstad	26 October; 2 November	Ullevaal Stadion, Oslo	27,529; 24,022	
1970	Strømsgodset	4–2	Lyn	25 October	Ullevaal Stadion, Oslo	25,744	
1971	Rosenborg BK	4–1	Fredrikstad	24 October	Ullevaal stadion, Oslo	25,180	
1972	Brann	1–0	Rosenborg BK	22 October	Ullevaal Stadion, Oslo	17,700	
1973	Strømsgodset	1–0	Rosenborg BK	21 October	Ullevaal Stadion, Oslo	23,209	
1974	Skeid	3–1	Viking	21 October	Ullevaal Stadion, Oslo	14,276	
1975	Bodø/Glimt	2–0	Vard	26 October	Ullevaal Stadion, Oslo	24,778	
1976	Brann	2–1	Sogndal	24 October	Ullevaal Stadion, Oslo	22,834	
1977	Lillestrøm	1–0	Bodø/Glimt	24 October	Ullevaal Stadion, Oslo	22,648	
1978	Lillestrøm	2–1	Brann	22 October	Ullevaal Stadion, Oslo	23,534	
1979	Viking	2–1	Haugar	22 October	Ullevaal Stadion, Oslo	23,534	
1980	Vålerengen	4–1	Lillestrøm	26 October	Ullevaal Stadion, Oslo	23,000	
1981	Lillestrøm	3–1	Moss	25 October	Ullevaal Stadion, Oslo	22,895	
1982	Brann	3–2	Molde	24 October	Ullevaal Stadion, Oslo	24,000	
1983	Moss	2–0	Vålerengen	23 October	Ullevaal Stadion, Oslo	23,000	
1984	Fredrikstad	3–3 (aet); 3–2	Viking	28 October; 4 November	Ullevaal Stadion, Oslo	23,668; 15,993	
1985	Lillestrøm	4–1	Vålerengen	20 October	Ullevaal Stadion, Oslo	18,500	
1986	Tromsø	4–1	Lillestrøm	26 October	Ullevaal Stadion, Oslo	22,000	
1987	Bryne	1–0 (aet)	Brann	25 October	Ullevaal Stadion, Oslo	23,080	
1988	Rosenborg BK	2–2 (aet); 2–0	Brann	23 October; 30 October	Ullevaal Stadion, Oslo	23,500; 23,700	
1989	Viking	2–2 (aet); 2–1	Molde	22 October; 29 October	Ullevaal Stadion, Oslo	23,000; 9,856	
1990	Rosenborg BK	5–1	Fyllingen	21 October	Ullevaal Stadion, Oslo	30,000	
1991	Strømsgodset	3–2	Rosenborg BK	20 October	Ullevaal Stadion, Oslo	27,240	
1992	Rosenborg BK	3–2	Lillestrøm	25 October	Ullevaal Stadion, Oslo	28,217	
1993	Bodø/Glimt	2–0	Strømsgodset	24 October	Ullevaal Stadion, Oslo	26,315	
1994	Molde	3–2	Lyn	23 October	Ullevaal Stadion, Oslo	24,524	
1995	Rosenborg BK	1–1 (aet); 3–1	Brann	29 October; 5 November	Ullevaal Stadion, Oslo	27,561; 20,076	
1996	Tromsø	2–1	Bodø/Glimt	27 October	Ullevaal Stadion, Oslo	22,683	
1997	Vålerenga	4–2	Strømsgodset	26 October	Ullevaal Stadion, Oslo	22,678	
1998	Stabæk	3–1 (aet)	Rosenborg BK	1 November	Ullevaal Stadion, Oslo	23,151	
1999	Rosenborg BK	2–0	Brann	30 October	Ullevaal Stadion, Oslo	25,296	
2000	Odd Grenland	2–1	Viking	29 October	Ullevaal Stadion, Oslo	24,864	
2001	Viking	3–0	Bryne	4 November	Ullevaal Stadion, Oslo	25,823	
2002	Vålerenga	1–0	Odd Grenland	3 November	Ullevaal Stadion, Oslo	25,481	
2003	Rosenborg BK	3–1 (aet)	Bodø/Glimt	9 November	Ullevaal Stadion, Oslo	25,447	
2004	Brann	4–1	Lyn	7 November	Ullevaal Stadion, Oslo	25,458	
2005	Molde	4–2 (aet)	Lillestrøm	6 November	Ullevaal Stadion, Oslo	25,128	
2006	Fredrikstad	3–0	Sandefjord	12 November	Ullevaal Stadion, Oslo	25,102	
2007	Lillestrøm	2–0	Haugesund	12 November	Ullevaal Stadion, Oslo	24,361	
2008	Vålerenga	4–1	Stabæk	9 November	Ullevaal Stadion, Oslo	24,823	
2009	Aalesund	2–2 (aet) (5–4) (p)	Molde	8 November	Ullevaal Stadion, Oslo	25,109	
2010	Strømsgodset	2–0	Follo	13 November	Ullevaal Stadion, Oslo	24,532	
2011	Aalesund	2–1	Brann	6 November	Ullevaal Stadion, Oslo	25,032	
2012	Hødd	1–1 (aet) (4–2) (p)	Tromsø	25 November	Ullevaal Stadion, Oslo	24,217	
2013	Molde	4–2	Rosenborg BK	24 November	Ullevaal Stadion, Oslo	24,824	
2014	Molde	2–0	Odd	23 November	Ullevaal Stadion, Oslo	26,582	
2015	Rosenborg	2–0	Sarpsborg 08	22 November	Ullevaal Stadion, Oslo	26,507	
2016	Rosenborg	4–0	Kongsvinger	20 November	Ullevaal Stadion, Oslo	26,912	
2017	Lillestrøm	3–2	Sarpsborg 08	3 December	Ullevaal Stadion, Oslo	25,091	
2018	Rosenborg	4–1	Strømsgodset	2 December	Ullevaal Stadion, Oslo	22,182	
2019	Viking	1–0	Haugesund	8 December	Ullevaal Stadion, Oslo	21,895	
2021	Molde	1–0	Bodø/Glimt	1 May 2022	Ullevaal Stadion, Oslo	19,567	
2022	Brann	2–0	Lillestrøm	20 May 2023	Ullevaal Stadion, Oslo	25,532	
2023	Molde	1–0	Bodø/Glimt	9 December	Ullevaal Stadion, Oslo	19,178	
2024	Fredrikstad	0–0 (aet) (5–4) (p)	Molde	7 December	Ullevaal Stadion, Oslo	23,058	
2025	Lillestrøm						
2026	Bodø/Glimt						
