= 1985 Norwegian Football Cup final =

- Event: 1985 Norwegian Football Cup
Lillestrøm	Vålerengen
4	1
- Date: 20 October 1985
- Venue: Ullevaal Stadion, Oslo
- Referee: Tore Hollung
- Attendance: 18,500

The 1985 Norwegian Football Cup final was the final match of the 1985 Norwegian Football Cup, the 80th season of the Norwegian Football Cup, the premier Norwegian football cup competition organized by the Football Association of Norway (NFF). The match was played on 20 October 1985 at the Ullevaal Stadion in Oslo, and opposed two First Division sides Lillestrøm and Vålerengen. Lillestrøm defeated Vålerengen 4–1 to claim the Norwegian Cup for a fourth time in their history.

== Route to the final ==
Lillestrøm			Round	Vålerengen		
Lørenskog	1–1 aet (H)	10–0 (A)	Round 1	Bjørkelangen	2–1 (A)	
Kjelsås	2–0 (A)		Round 2	Sarpsborg	4–0 (H)	
Manglerud/Star	5–0 (H)		Round 3	Sprint/Jeløy	2–1 (A)	
Kongsvinger	3–3 aet (H)	3–2 (A)	Round 4	Odd	2–1 (A)	
HamKam	1–0 (A)		Quarterfinal	Strindheim	9–1 (H)	
Tromsø	2–0 (H)		Semifinal	Faaberg	3–3 aet (H)	4–1 (A)

== Match ==
=== Details ===
20 October 1985
13:15 CEST (UTC+2)

Lillestrøm	4–1	Vålerengen
Krogsæter 26', 34', 74', 85'	Report	Davidsen 57'

Ullevaal Stadion, Oslo
Attendance: 18,500
Referee: Tore Hollung (Østsiden)

Lillestrøm:
GK	(Norway) Arne Amundsen
DF	(Norway) Ole Dyrstad
DF	(Norway) Georg Hammer
DF	(Norway) Bård Bjerkeland
DF	(Norway) Tor Inge Smedås	(substituted off) 79'
MF	(Norway) Rune Richardsen
MF	(Norway) Kjetil Osvold
MF	(Norway) Arne Erlandsen
AM	(Norway) Tom Sundby
FW	(Norway) Joar Vaadal	(substituted off) 88'
FW	(Norway) André Krogsæter
Substitutions:
DF	(Norway) Bjørnar Erlandsen	(substituted in) 88'
DF	(Norway) Gunnar Halle	(substituted in) 79'
DF	(Norway) Bjarne Sognnæs
Coach:
(Norway) Tom Lund

Vålerengen:
GK	(Norway) Espen Muggebye
DF	(Norway) Jan Erik Aalbu
DF	(Norway) Jo Bergsvand
DF	(Norway) Lasse Eriksen
DF	(Norway) Per Edmund Mordt
MF	(Norway) Tore Nilsen	(substituted off) 80'
MF	(Norway) Knut Arild Løberg
MF	(Norway) Vidar Davidsen
MF	(Norway) Egil Johansen	(substituted off) 88'
FW	(Norway) Jørn Andersen
FW	(Norway) Paal Fredheim
Substitutions:
MF	(Norway) Steinar Enerly	(substituted in) 80'
FW	(Norway) Henning Lund	(substituted in) 88'
Coach:
(Sweden) Olle Nordin
