= 1983 Norwegian Football Cup final =

- Event: 1983 Norwegian Football Cup
Moss	Vålerengen
2	0
- Date: 23 October 1983
- Venue: Ullevaal Stadion, Oslo
- Referee: Thorodd Presberg
- Attendance: 23,000

The 1983 Norwegian Football Cup final was the final match of the 1983 Norwegian Football Cup, the 78th season of the Norwegian Football Cup, the premier Norwegian football cup competition organized by the Football Association of Norway (NFF). The match was played on 23 October 1983 at the Ullevaal Stadion in Oslo, and opposed two First Division sides Moss and Vålerengen. Moss defeated Vålerengen 2–0 to claim the Norwegian Cup for a first time in their history.

== Route to the final ==
Moss			Round	Vålerengen		
Tønsberg-Kameratene	A	5–1	Round 1	Oppsal	A	3–2
Østsiden	H	6–0	Round 2	Lillehammer	H	6–0
Strømsgodset	A	3–2	Round 3	Stranda	A	2–0
Rosenborg	H	3–2	Round 4	Lillestrøm	H	2–0
Mjøndalen	A	2–1	Quarterfinal	Strømmen	A	2–1
Kongsvinger	H	3–1	Semifinal	Steinkjer	H	1–0

== Match ==
=== Details ===
23 October 1983
13:15 CEST (UTC+2)

Moss	2–0	Vålerengen
Kollshaugen 9' (pen.); Henæs 84'	Report

Ullevaal Stadion, Oslo
Attendance: 23,000
Referee: Thorodd Presberg (Strømsgodset)

Moss:
GK	1	(Norway) Nils Espen Eriksen	(substituted off) 89'
RB	2	(Norway) Rune Gjestrumbakken
CB	3	(Norway) Morten Vinje
CB	4	(Norway) Tore Gregersen
LB	5	(Norway) Svein Grøndalen	(substituted off) 62'
MF	6	(Norway) Per Heliasz
MF	7	(Norway) Stein Kollshaugen
MF	8	(Norway) Ole Johnny Henriksen
FW	9	(Norway) Geir Henæs
FW	10	(Norway) Jan Rafn
FW	11	(Norway) Brede Halvorsen
Substitutions:
GK	12	(Norway) Odd Skauen	(substituted in) 89'
DF	13	(Norway) Lars Ragnar Kristiansen
MF	14	(Norway) Anders Eriksen
MF	15	(Norway) Pål Grønstad
DF	16	(Norway) Hans Deunk	(substituted in) 62'
Coach:
(Norway) Per Mosgaard

Vålerengen:
GK	1	(Norway) Tom R. Jacobsen
RB	2	(Norway) Per Gunnar Bredesen
CB	3	(Norway) Trond Sollied
CB	4	(Norway) Dag Austmo
LB	5	(Norway) Tor Brevik	(red card) 7'
MF	6	(Norway) Henning Bjarnøy
MF	7	(Norway) Stein Gran
MF	8	(Norway) Vidar Davidsen
MF	9	(Norway) Egil Johansen
FW	10	(Norway) Lasse Eriksen	(substituted off) 61'
FW	11	(Norway) Jo Bergsvand	(substituted off) 61'
Substitutions:
GK	12	(Norway) Jon Ole Moe
FW	13	(Norway) Paal Fredheim	(substituted in) 61'
FW	14	(Norway) Pål Jacobsen	(substituted in) 61'
DF	15	(Norway) Tore Nilsen
MF	16	(Norway) Bengt Eriksen
Coach:
(Norway) Svein Ivar Sigernes
