= 1981 Norwegian Football Cup final =

- Event: 1981 Norwegian Football Cup
Lillestrøm	Moss
3	1
- Date: 23 October 1981
- Venue: Ullevaal Stadion, Oslo
- Referee: Jan Erik Olsen
- Attendance: 22,895

The 1981 Norwegian Football Cup final was the final match of the 1981 Norwegian Football Cup, the 76th season of the Norwegian Football Cup, the premier Norwegian football cup competition organized by the Football Association of Norway (NFF). The match was played on 25 October 1981 at the Ullevaal Stadion in Oslo, and opposed two First Division sides Lillestrøm and Moss. Lillestrøm defeated Moss 3–1 to claim the Norwegian Cup for a third time in their history.

== Route to the final ==
Lillestrøm			Round	Moss		
Lørenskog	A	2–0	Round 1	Skotterud	A	7–0
Snøgg	H	5–0	Round 2	Eidsvold Turn	H	5–1
Strømmen	A	2–0	Round 3	Pors	A	2–1
Rosenborg	H	4–2 aet	Round 4	Fredrikstad	H	6–0
Bryne	A	1–0	Quarterfinal	Start	A	3–0
Vålerengen	A	2–0	Semifinal	Viking	H	2–0

== Match ==
=== Details ===
25 October 1981
13:15 CET (UTC+1)

Lillestrøm	3–1	Moss
Krogsæter 16'; Lund 32' (pen.); Lønstad 49'	Report	Kollshaugen 89'

Ullevaal Stadion, Oslo
Attendance: 22,895
Referee: Jan Erik Olsen (Drammens BK)

Lillestrøm:
GK	(Norway) Arne Amundsen	(substituted off) 90'
DF	(Norway) Erik Solér
DF	(Norway) Frank Grønlund
DF	(Norway) Tore Kordahl
DF	(Norway) Tor Inge Smedås
MF	(Norway) Bård Bjerkeland	Booked
MF	(Norway) Ole Dyrstad
MF	(Norway) Gunnar Lønstad
MF	(Norway) André Krogsæter
FW	(Norway) Tom Lund
FW	(Norway) Roger Skjåstad	(substituted off) 84'
Substitutions::
GK	(Norway) Tor Helge Bergan	(substituted in) 90'
MF	(Norway) Jon Erik Andersen	(substituted in) 84'
FW	(Norway) Arne Dokken
FW	(Norway) Stein Eilertsen
Coach:
(Norway) Kjell Schou-Andreassen

Moss:
GK	(Norway) Odd Skauen
DF	(Norway) Jon Pettersen
DF	(Norway) Hans Deunk
DF	(Norway) Morten Vinje
DF	(Norway) Svein Grøndalen
MF	(Norway) Roar Breivik	(substituted off) 53'
MF	(Norway) Stein Kollshaugen
MF	(Norway) Per Heliasz
FW	(Norway) Geir Henæs
FW	(Norway) Ole Johnny Henriksen
FW	(Norway) Kurt Tunheim	(substituted off) 86'
Substitutions:
	(Norway) Per Otto Karlsen	(substituted in) 53' (yellow card)
	(Norway) Jan Erik Fredriksen	(substituted in) 86'
Coach:
(Norway) Anders Fægri
