= 1985 Norwegian Football Cup =

Norgesmesterskapet i fotball for herrer

Tournament details
- Country: Norway
- Teams: 128 (main competition)

Final positions
- Champions: Lillestrøm (4th title)
- Runners-up: Vålerengen

The 1985 Norwegian Football Cup was the 80th edition of the Norwegian annual knockout football tournament. The Cup was won by Lillestrøm after beating Vålerengen in the cup final with the score 4–1. This was Lillestrøm's fourth Norwegian Cup title.

== First round ==
Team 1	Score	Team 2
24 May 1985
Bjørkelangen	1–2	Vålerengen
Drafn	0–5	Ørn-Horten
Rosenborg	1–0	Røros
28 May 1985
Nybergsund	5–1	Cartherud
Raufoss	2–1	Vikersund
29 May 1985
Sødal	2–5	Start
Kjelsås	1–0	Brumunddal
Lillestrøm	1–1 (a.e.t.)	Lørenskog
Tjølling	0–0 (a.e.t.)	Slemmestad
Sola	1–0	Figgjo
Sandane	1–5	Ørsta
Spjelkavik	1–2	Åndalsnes
Nidelv/Falken	0–3	Orkdal
30 May 1985
Florvåg	1-4	Fyllingen
Vidar	1–0	Klepp
Pors	1–0	Sandefjord BK
Ullern	1–2	Moss
Sprint/Jeløy	4–3	Teie
Sarpsborg	3–1	Skeid
Sandnessjøen	1–3	Mo
Bodø/Glimt	1–0 (a.e.t.)	Mjølner
Steinkjer	5–0	Namsos
Strindheim	1–1 (a.e.t.)	Fram Skatval
Åsane	1–2	Brann
Norna-Salhus	2–4	Varegg
Valder	0–2	Hødd
Orkanger	0–2	Kristiansund
Clausenengen	2–0	Molde
Lillehammer	1–1 (a.e.t.)	Faaberg
Larvik Turn	0–4	Eik-Tønsberg
Vigør	2–1	Grane (Arendal)
Sykkylven	1–1 (a.e.t.)	Aalesund
Brekken	0–1	Alvdal
Nessegutten	1–0	Ekne
Stryn	3–0	Hareid
Sogndal	9–0	Jotun
Sunndal	3–1	Todalen
HamKam	7–0	Løten
Jevnaker	0–4	Mjøndalen
Charlottenlund	4–0	Stjørdals/Blink
Fauske/Sprint	2–0	Junkeren
Stålkameratene	0–0 (a.e.t.)	Grand Bodø
Bærum	0–2	Manglerud/Star
Fredrikstad	1–0	Østsiden
Kolbotn	1–4	Gjøvik-Lyn
Kongsvinger	4–0	Skotterud
Abildsø	0–2	Råde
Kvik Halden	2–0	Lisleby
Os	1–2 (a.e.t.)	Lyngbø
Fana	4–2	Ny-Krohnborg
Egersund	1–3	Viking
Vard Haugesund	0–2	Djerv 1919
Karnes	2–7	Tromsø
Alta	1–2	Kautokeino
Lyngen	1–0	Tromsdalen
Harstad	1–0 (a.e.t.)	Andenes
Fram Larvik	3–0	Tollnes
Mosterøy	0–5	Bryne
Randaberg	2–1	Haugar
Åssiden	0–1	Lyn
Strømsgodset	6–1	Bødalen
Eidsvold Turn	0–7	Strømmen
Asker	1–0	Moelven
Jerv	0–2	Odd
Replay: 5 June 1985
Faaberg	5–2	Lillehammer
Aalesund	2–1	Sykkylven
Slemmestad	4–1	Tjølling
Grand Bodø	0–0 (4–5 p)	Stålkameratene
Replay: 6 June 1985
Fram Skatval	1–2	Strindheim
Lørenskog	0–10	Lillestrøm

== Second round ==
Team 1	Score	Team 2
11 June 1985
Strømmen	3–1 (a.e.t.)	Asker
12 June 1985
Odd	3–0	Pors
Mo	1–0	Bodø/Glimt
Steinkjer	3–3 (a.e.t.)	Strindheim
Start	1–3	Sola
Brann	4–0	Varegg
Åndalsnes	0–2 (a.e.t.)	Hødd
Kristiansund	3–0	Clausenengen
Faaberg	4–2 (a.e.t.)	Nybergsund
Eik-Tønsberg	3–1	Vigør
Ørsta	0–2	Aalesund
Alvdal	0–2	Nessegutten
Stryn	0–2	Sogndal
Slemmestad	1–4	HamKam
Mjøndalen	4–1	Raufoss
Fauske/Sprint	2–1	Stålkameratene
Manglerud/Star	1–0	Fredrikstad
Gjøvik-Lyn	1–3	Kongsvinger
Råde	2–1	Kvik Halden
Viking	3–0	Djerv 1919
Tromsø	6–1	Kautokeino
Lyngen	1–0	Harstad
Bryne	4–1	Randaberg
Lyn	1–2	Strømsgodset
13 June 1985
Fyllingen	2–3	Vidar
Lyngbø	2–3	Fana
Moss	1–3	Sprint/Jeløy
Vålerengen	4–0	Sarpsborg
Kjelsås	0–2	Lillestrøm
Charlottenlund	0–4	Rosenborg
Ørn-Horten	1–2 (a.e.t.)	Fram Larvik
18 June 1985
Orkdal	0–1	Sunndal
Replay: 19 June 1985
Strindheim	2–1	Steinkjer

== Third round ==
Team 1	Score	Team 2
26 June 1985
Vidar	0–1 (a.e.t.)	Odd
Sprint/Jeløy	1–2	Vålerengen
Mo	1–3	Strindheim
Sola	0–1	Brann
Hødd	3–2	Kristiansund
Faaberg	4–2 (a.e.t.)	Eik-Tønsberg
Aalesund	2–1	Nessegutten
Sogndal	3–0	Sunndal
HamKam	4–1 (a.e.t.)	Mjøndalen
Rosenborg	4–0	Fauske/Sprint
Kongsvinger	3–2	Råde
Tromsø	4–0	Lyngen
Fram Larvik	1–1 (a.e.t.)	Bryne
Strømsgodset	3–1	Strømmen
29 June 1985
Lillestrøm	5–0	Manglerud/Star
Fana	0–2	Viking
Replay: 24 July 1985
Bryne	1–2	Fram Larvik

== Fourth round ==
31 July 1985

Odd	1–2	Vålerengen
Røise 90'		Andersen 8', 53'

Odd Stadion, Skien
Attendance: 5,500
Referee: Harald Hansen

31 July 1985

Strindheim	2–0	Brann
Høvik 26'; Jørgensen 47'

Lerkendal Stadion, Trondheim
Attendance: 788
Referee: Arlid Haugstad

31 July 1985

Hødd	2–3	Faaberg
Roppen 4', 53' (pen.)		Haugstad 13'; Tøftum 42', 60'

Høddvoll Stadion, Ulsteinvik
Attendance: 2,200
Referee: Thorbjørn Aass

31 July 1985

Aalesund	2–1	Sogndal
Brogstad 3', 13'		Bakke 58'

Kråmyra Stadion, Ålesund
Attendance: 2,000
Referee: Kaare Lindboe

31 July 1985

HamKam	3–2	Rosenborg
Erstad 27'; Jacobsen 62'; Sundmoen 79'		Angvik 37'; Sørloth 40'

Briskeby gressbane, Hamar
Attendance: 5,017
Referee: Kåre Erlandsen

31 July 1985

Lillestrøm	3–3 (a.e.t.)	Kongsvinger
Osvold 32'; Sundby 49', 108'		Holtet 9', 116'; Nystuen 21'

Åråsen Stadion, Lillestrøm
Attendance: 3,846
Referee: Jan Erik Olsen

31 July 1985

Viking	2–2 (a.e.t.)	Tromsø
Lundal 8'; Hammer 55'		Jensen 48'; Johansen 80'

Stavanger Stadion, Stavanger
Attendance: 3,085
Referee: Thorodd Presberg

31 July 1985

Fram Larvik	0–1	Strømsgodset
		Storskogen 73'

Framparken, Larvik
Attendance: c. 3,000
Referee: Tore Hollung

=== Replay ===
7 August 1985

Kongsvinger	2–3	Lillestrøm
Nystuen 65'; Erlandsen 85' (o.g.)		Krogsæter 34', 42', 63'

Gjemselund Stadion, Kongsvinger
Attendance: 4,077
Referee: Kjell Nordby

15 August 1985

Tromsø	3–1 (a.e.t.)	Viking
Høgmo 9', 110'; Jensen 99'		Lundal 25'

Alfheim Stadion, Tromsø
Attendance: 3,105
Referee: Einar Halle

== Quarter-finals ==
21 August 1985

Faaberg	2–0	Aalesund
Ahlsen 68'; Haugstad 83'

Jorekstad Stadion, Fåberg
Attendance: 3,486
Referee: Svein-Inge Thime

21 August 1985

HamKam	0–1	Lillestrøm
		Kristiansen 9' (o.g.)

Briskeby gressbane, Hamar
Attendance: 6,890
Referee: Egil Nervik

21 August 1985

Tromsø	5–0	Strømsgodset
Unknown 3' (o.g.); T. Johansen 34', 46'; Høgmo 58'; Forfang 59'

Alfheim Stadion, Tromsø
Attendance: 6,387
Referee: Espen Larsen

22 August 1985

Vålerengen	9–1	Strindheim
Aalbu 15'; Fredheim 35', 88'; Løberg 41', 56', 78'; Andersen 52'; Bergsvand 81'; Johansen 83'		Jørgensen 61'

Bislett Stadion, Oslo
Attendance: 4,939
Referee: Erling Haugen

== Semi-finals ==
22 September 1985

Vålerengen	3–3 (a.e.t.)	Faaberg
Davidsen 55' (pen.); Mordt 62'; Fredheim 73'		Haugstad 24'; Hammershaug 29'; Tøftum 79'

Bislett Stadion, Oslo
Attendance: 17,006
Referee: Thorbjørn Aass

22 September 1985

Lillestrøm	2–0	Tromsø
Sundby 44'; Vaadal 84'

Åråsen Stadion, Lillestrøm
Attendance: 9,030
Referee: Per Arne Larsgård

=== Replay ===
8 October 1985

Faaberg	1–4	Vålerengen
Evensen 16'		Fredheim 4'; Bergsvand 13'; Løberg 50'; Andersen 87'

Jorekstad Stadion, Fåberg
Attendance: 10,850
Referee: Einar Halle

== Final ==
20 October 1985
13:15 CEST (UTC+2)

Lillestrøm	4–1	Vålerengen
Krogsæter 26', 34', 74', 85'	Report	Davidsen 57'

Ullevaal Stadion, Oslo
Attendance: 18,500
Referee: Tore Hollung (Østsiden)
