= 1938 in Norwegian football =

Football in Norway
Men's football
- Norgesserien: Fredrikstad
- NM: Fredrikstad

Results from Norwegian football (soccer) from 1938.

== Norgesserien 1937/38 ==
=== District I ===
Pos	Team	Pld	W	D	L	GF	GA	GD	Pts	Qualification or relegation
1	Fredrikstad FK (C)	12	9	1	2	30	10	+20	19	Qualification for the championship play-offs quarter-final
2	Kvik Halden FK	12	8	2	2	27	17	+10	18	
3	Sarpsborg FK	12	7	1	4	37	19	+18	15	
4	Moss FK	12	5	1	6	28	31	−3	11	
5	Torp IF	12	3	2	7	17	26	−9	8	
6	Lisleby FK	12	3	2	7	18	33	−15	8	
7	Selbak TIF (R)	12	2	1	9	11	32	−21	5	Relegation

(C) Champions; (R) Relegated

=== District II, Group A ===
Pos	Team	Pld	W	D	L	GF	GA	GD	Pts	Qualification or relegation
1	SFK Lyn	12	9	2	1	41	10	+31	20	Qualification for the championship play-offs preliminary round
2	SK Drafn	12	9	1	2	26	11	+15	19	
3	Geithus IL	12	6	2	4	20	26	−6	14	
4	SK Strong	12	5	1	6	24	22	+2	11	
5	Frigg Oslo FK	12	3	3	6	16	23	−7	9	
6	Lillestrøm SK	12	3	1	8	20	32	−12	7	
7	Drammens BK (R)	12	1	2	9	13	36	−23	4	Relegation

(R) Relegated

=== District II, Group B ===
Pos	Team	Pld	W	D	L	GF	GA	GD	Pts	Qualification or relegation
1	Mjøndalen IF	12	10	1	1	53	8	+45	21	Qualification for the championship play-offs preliminary round
2	Jevnaker IF	12	5	5	2	25	19	+6	15	
3	SK Gjøa	12	5	4	3	34	25	+9	14	
4	Vålerengens IF	12	4	4	4	16	24	−8	12	
5	Nydalen IL	12	5	0	7	27	26	+1	10	
6	SBK Skiold	12	4	2	6	23	24	−1	10	
7	Fredensborg (R)	12	1	0	11	6	58	−52	2	Relegation

(R) Relegated

=== District III ===
Pos	Team	Pld	W	D	L	GF	GA	GD	Pts	Qualification or relegation
1	FK Lyn (Gjøvik)	12	8	1	3	29	18	+11	17	Qualification for the championship play-offs quarter-final
2	Fremad	12	7	1	4	26	25	+1	15	
3	Hamar IL	12	6	2	4	38	22	+16	14	
4	Vardal IF	12	6	2	4	30	21	+9	14	
5	Raufoss IL	12	6	1	5	27	26	+1	13	
6	Kapp IF	12	3	1	8	18	30	−12	7	
7	Moelven IL (R)	12	2	0	10	11	37	−26	4	Relegation

(R) Relegated

=== District IV, Group A ===
Pos	Team	Pld	W	D	L	GF	GA	GD	Pts	Qualification or relegation
1	Odd BK	12	10	0	2	43	9	+34	20	Qualification for the championship play-offs preliminary round
2	IF Urædd	12	7	1	4	24	21	+3	15	
3	IF Borg	12	5	3	4	34	35	−1	13	
4	Ørn	12	5	2	5	24	29	−5	12	
5	SK Snøgg	12	4	3	5	18	25	−7	11	
6	Larvik TIF	12	3	1	8	20	31	−11	7	
7	IF Tønsberg-Kameratene (R)	12	2	2	8	13	26	−13	6	Relegation

(R) Relegated

=== District IV, Group B ===
Pos	Team	Pld	W	D	L	GF	GA	GD	Pts	Qualification or relegation
1	IF Fram	12	9	1	2	32	10	+22	19	Qualification for the championship play-offs preliminary round
2	IF Pors	12	8	2	2	33	23	+10	18	
3	Storm BK	12	7	1	4	31	13	+18	15	
4	Berger IL	12	6	0	6	34	25	+9	12	
5	Skiens BK	12	6	0	6	25	35	−10	12	
6	Tønsberg TF	12	3	0	9	16	33	−17	6	
7	Halsen IF (R)	12	1	0	11	10	42	−32	2	Relegation

(R) Relegated

=== District V, Group A ===
Pos	Team	Pld	W	D	L	GF	GA	GD	Pts	Qualification or relegation
1	FK Vigør	10	8	2	0	34	9	+25	18	Qualification for the championship play-offs preliminary round
2	Flekkefjord FK	10	7	1	2	38	12	+26	15	
3	IK Grane	10	5	2	3	24	15	+9	12	
4	IK Start	10	4	2	4	18	21	−3	10	
5	FK Donn	10	1	1	8	6	25	−19	3	
6	Kragerø TF (R)	10	1	0	9	10	48	−38	2	Relegation

(R) Relegated

=== District V, Group B ===
Pos	Team	Pld	W	D	L	GF	GA	GD	Pts	Qualification or relegation
1	Viking FK	12	9	0	3	37	13	+24	18	Qualification for the championship play-offs preliminary round
2	Stavanger IF	12	9	0	3	31	13	+18	18	
3	SK Jarl	12	8	0	4	35	25	+10	16	
4	SK Vard	12	5	2	5	15	20	−5	12	
5	Ulf-Sandnes	12	5	1	6	28	26	+2	11	
6	BK Brodd	12	1	4	7	16	32	−16	6	
7	SK Djerv 1919 (R)	12	1	1	10	12	45	−33	3	Relegation

(R) Relegated

=== District VI ===
Pos	Team	Pld	W	D	L	GF	GA	GD	Pts	Qualification or relegation
1	SK Djerv	10	10	0	0	46	16	+30	20	Qualification for the championship play-offs quarter-final
2	SK Brann	10	5	2	3	31	21	+10	12	
3	SK Hardy	10	4	2	4	30	25	+5	10	
4	Årstad IL	10	3	1	6	20	31	−11	7	
5	SK Viggo	10	2	3	5	16	29	−13	7	
6	Minde IL (R)	10	2	0	8	19	40	−21	4	Relegation

(R) Relegated

=== District VII ===
Pos	Team	Pld	W	D	L	GF	GA	GD	Pts	Qualification or relegation
1	Kristiansund FK	10	8	1	1	46	17	+29	17	Qualification for the championship play-offs quarter-final
2	Aalesunds FK	10	5	1	4	23	17	+6	11	
3	SPK Rollon	10	4	1	5	21	26	−5	9	
4	IL Braatt	10	3	2	5	20	18	+2	8	
5	Clausenengen FK	10	3	2	5	18	30	−12	8	
6	Veblungsnes FK (R)	10	3	1	6	17	37	−20	7	Relegation

(R) Relegated

=== District VIII ===
Pos	Team	Pld	W	D	L	GF	GA	GD	Pts	Qualification or relegation
1	Neset FK	12	8	3	1	38	15	+23	19	Qualification for the championship play-offs quarter-final
2	Ranheim IL	12	8	3	1	28	14	+14	19	
3	Steinkjer FK	12	5	5	2	34	23	+11	15	
4	SK Brage	12	5	1	6	25	24	+1	11	
5	National	12	3	2	7	28	35	−7	8	
6	Rosenborg BK	12	4	0	8	22	37	−15	8	
7	Orkanger IF (R)	12	1	2	9	21	48	−27	4	Relegation

(R) Relegated

=== Championship rounds ===
==== First round ====
May 22
Odd-Fram Larvik 0-1
Viking-Vigør 3-0

May 26
Mjøndalen-Lyn 1-2

==== Second round ====
May 29
Fram Larvik-Odd 1-1 (Total: 2-1)
Vigør-Viking 0-0 (Total: 0-3)
Lyn-Mjøndalen 0-0 (Total: 2-1)

==== Championship quarter-finals ====
===== First leg =====
June 12
Fredrikstad-Fram Larvik 1-0
Lyn-Gjøvik/Lyn 5-1
Viking-Djerv 6-2
Kristiansund-Neset 2-0

===== Second leg =====
June 19
Fram Larvik-Fredrikstad 1-3 (Total:1-4)
Gjøvik/Lyn-Lyn 2-2 (Total:3-7)
Djerv-Viking 4-0 (Total:6-6, Djerv goes to the next round)
Neset-Kristiansund 2-5 (Total: 2-7)

==== Championship semi-finals ====
June 26
Djerv-Lyn 2-3
Fredrikstad-Kristiansund 3-2

==== Championship final ====
===== First leg =====
July 3
Lyn-Fredrikstad 0-0

===== Second leg =====
August 28
Fredrikstad-Lyn 4-0

== Promotion ==
Fjell, Holmestrand, Nordlandet, Sandefjord, Skeid, Skiens-Grane, Skreia, Strømsgodset, Tistedalen, Verdal, Voss, Ålgård

== Norwegian Cup ==
=== Final ===
16 October 1938

Fredrikstad	3–2 (a.e.t.)	Mjøndalen
Larsen 5'; Brynildsen 40' (pen.); Ileby 110'	Report	Halvorsen 60'; Hval 63'

Briskeby, Hamar
Attendance: 12,000
Referee: Finn Amundsen (Lyn)

== Northern Norwegian Cup ==
=== Final ===
Harstad	2–1	Narvik/Nor
	Report

== National team ==
31 May 1938 Friendly	Norway	1–0	Estonia	Aker, Norway
19:15 (UTC+1); Match 128	Brustad 65'	Report		Stadium: Ullevaal Stadion; Attendance: 19,200; Referee: Einar Lundström (Finland)

5 June 1938 1938 FIFA World Cup; Round of 16	Italy	2–1 (a.e.t.)	Norway	Marseille, France
19:15 (UTC+1); Match 129	Ferraris 2'; Piola 94'	Report	Brustad 83'	Stadium: Stade Vélodrome; Attendance: 18,826; Referee: Alois Beranek (Germany)

17 June 1938 1937–47 Nordic Championship	Norway	9–0	Finland	Aker, Norway
19:30 (UTC+1); Match 130	Isaksen 3'; Brustad 11', 22', 25', 33'; Kvammen 17' (pen.), 51'; Andersen 67'; Arnesen 70'	Report		Stadium: Ullevaal Stadion; Attendance: 28,000; Referee: Valdemar Laursen (Denmark)

4 September 1938 Friendly	Norway	2–1	Sweden	Aker, Norway
13:15 (UTC+1); Match 131	Arnesen 22'; Brynildsen 62'	Report	Hansson 15'	Stadium: Ullevaal Stadion; Attendance: 33,098; Referee: Valdemar Laursen (Denmark)

18 September 1938 1937–47 Nordic Championship	Norway	1–1	Denmark	Aker, Norway
13:15 (UTC+1); Match 132	Arnesen 33'	Report	K. Hansen 42'	Stadium: Ullevaal Stadion; Attendance: 33,065; Referee: Rudolf Eklöw (Sweden)

2 October 1938 1937–47 Nordic Championship	Sweden	2–3	Norway	Solna, Sweden
14:00 (UTC+1); Match 133	Persson 27'; Nyberg 66'	Report	Brustad 16'; Brynildsen 18'; Nordahl 35'	Stadium: Råsunda Stadium; Attendance: 38,000; Referee: James Jewell (England)

23 October 1938 Friendly	Poland	2–2	Norway	Warsaw, Poland
14:00 (UTC+1); Match 134	Piec 73'; Wilimowski 80'	Report	Nordahl 6'; A. Martinsen 41'	Stadium: Polish Army Stadium; Attendance: 16,000; Referee: John Langenus (Belgium)

9 November 1938 Friendly	England	4–0	Norway	Newcastle upon Tyne, England
14:30 (UTC); Match 135	Smith 13', 40'; Dix 20'; Lawton 35'	Report		Stadium: St James' Park; Attendance: 39,887; Referee: James Martin (Scotland)
