= Morten Kræmer =

Norwegian footballer (born 1967)

Personal information
- Date of birth: 10 July 1967 (age 59)
- Position: Defender

Youth career
- Kroken
- Tromsdalen

Senior career*
Years	Team	Apps	(Gls)
–1985	Tromsdalen		
1986–1988	Tromsø	16	(0)
1988	Tromsdalen		
1989	Tromsø	1	(0)
1990	Skarp		
1991–2001	Tromsø	193	(4)
2002	Skarp		
2003–2004	Tromsdalen		

Managerial career
- 2002: Skarp (assistant)
- 2004: Tromsdalen (assistant)
- 2007–2012: Tromsø (director of sports)
- * Club domestic league appearances and goals

Morten Kræmer (born 10 July 1967) is a retired Norwegian football defender.

He hails from Krokelvdalen and started his youth career in Kroken IL before joining Tromsdalen UIL. He made his senior debut for TUIL at the age of fifteen, but was signed by first-tier club Tromsø IL ahead of the 1986 season. The club won the 1986 Norwegian Football Cup, albeit without Kræmer playing the cup final, and contested the 1987–88 European Cup Winners' Cup. Kræmer mostly played for Tromsø until July 2001, and played when Tromsø won the 1996 Norwegian Football Cup.

In June 1988, he left Tromsø for the first time, training with FK Mjølner. Kræmer then chose to activate a clause in his contract that allowed him to move back to Tromsdalen. He was allowed to return to Tromsø ahead of the 1989 season, being signed as the 20th and last player.

The seasons 1989 through 1992 were greatly marred by several injuries. He first injured his meniscus and cruciate ligament in early 1989, then both feet and his left knee again, leading to multiple surgeries. For that reason, Kræmer also played the 1990 season on a lower level, in the 1990 2. divisjon for IF Skarp. He was yet again allowed to rejoin Tromsø ahead of the 1991 season.

Kræmer seldomly scored for Tromsø. He scored a goal in 1991; the next came in 1995, a brace from 20 metres which was the only goal at home against Strindheim.

In 2002 he was playing assistant manager of IF Skarp. After playing for Tromsdalen in 2004, he continued in 2004 as playing assistant manager. He was injured already in the second round of the 2004 1. divisjon, and Kræmer left as player and assistant in June. He would work as a real estate agent. He then worked a period for ISS. In October 2006, Kræmer was hired as the new director of sports in Tromsø, commencing in 2007. He resigned in 2012.

== Personal life ==
Morten Kræmer was married and had two daughters.

Morten Kræmer should not be confused for a journalist by the same name, also from Tromsø, who among others has worked for TV 2.
