= 1938 Norwegian Football Cup =

Norgesmester i fotball for menn 1938

Tournament details
- Country: Norway
- Teams: 128 (main competition)

Final positions
- Champions: Fredrikstad (3rd title)
- Runners-up: Mjøndalen

The 1938 Norwegian Football Cup was the 37th season of the Norwegian annual knockout football tournament. The tournament was open for all members of NFF, except those from Northern Norway. The final was played at Briskeby in Hamar on 16 October 1938, and was contested by the defending champions Mjøndalen and the three-time former winners Fredrikstad. Fredrikstad secured their fourth title with a 3–2 win after extra time in the final. Fredrikstad's cup-victory completed the first Norwegian double, having also won the inaugural League of Norway.

== First round ==
Team 1	Score	Team 2
Askim	1–5	Mjøndalen
Berger	0–8	Skeid
Brage	3–5	Nordlandet
Brann	4–0	Minde
Briskebyen	1–2	Moss
Brodd	1–2 (a.e.t.)	Hardy
Clausenengen	5–3	Orkanger
Djerv 1919	0–7	Stavanger
Donn	0–1 (a.e.t.)	Skotfoss
Drafn	1–1 (a.e.t.)	Skiens-Grane
Eidsvold IF	0–3	Torp
Flekkefjord	3–2	Egersund
Fredensborg	0–3	Raufoss
Fremad Lillehammer	1–5	Braatt
Frigg	5–2	Hamar
Gimsøy	0–1	Sarpsborg
Gleng	1–3	Strong
Grane	1–0	Drammens BK
Halsen	2–1	Kvik (Halden)
Jevnaker	6–1	Vang
Kjelsås	2–1	Borg
Kvik (Trondheim)	7–1	Sverre
Larvik Turn	6–0	Kragerø
Lillestrøm	3–0	Kapp
Lisleby	1–0	Mercantile
Liv	1–1 (a.e.t.)	Tønsberg Turn
Moelven	0–9	Nydalen
Nessegutten	0–2	Rosenborg
Odd	5–2	Sundjordet
Pallas	0–2	Vard
Pors	6–1	Hafslund
Ranheim	3–2 (a.e.t.)	National
Rollon	3–1	Molde
Selbak	2–2 (a.e.t.)	Strømsgodset
Skreia	0–5	Gjøa
Snøgg	1–2	Speed
Steinkjer	10–1	Tempo
Storm	2–0	Haga
Tistedalen	0–1	Skiold
Tønsberg-Kameratene	3–3 (a.e.t.)	Vigør
Ulf	1–1 (a.e.t.)	Start
Urædd	5–4	Eiker
Vardal	2–6	Geithus
Veblungsnes	2–1	Aalesund
Viggo	0–3	Jarl
Vålerengen	7–2	Skiens BK
Ørn	4–2	Strømmen
Ålgård	4–1	Årstad
Replay
Skiens-Grane	1–1 (a.e.t.)	Drafn
Start	0–1	Ulf
Strømsgodset	0–2	Selbak
Tønsberg Turn	1–0	Liv
Vigør	4–1	Tønsberg-Kameratene
2nd replay
Drafn	2–1 (a.e.t.)	Skiens-Grane

- Fredrikstad, Lyn, Djerv, Kristiansund, Lyn (Gjøvik), Fram (Larvik), Viking and Neset had a walkover.

== Second round ==
Team 1	Score	Team 2
Braatt	0–2	Kjelsås
Fram (Larvik)	3–1	Selbak
Geithus	0–2	Ørn
Gjøa	0–2	Storm
Lyn (Gjøvik)	2–4	Frigg
Hardy	2–2 (a.e.t.)	Ulf
Jarl	0–1	Brann
Kvik (Trondheim)	2–4	Veblungsnes
Mjøndalen	3–1	Grane
Moss	3–0	Halsen
Nordlandet	1–2	Neset
Nydalen	3–2 (a.e.t.)	Ranheim
Pors	3–0	Drafn
Raufoss	2–3	Jevnaker
Rollon	0–1	Speed
Rosenborg	1–2	Steinkjer
Sarpsborg	1–3	Lillestrøm
Skeid	4–0	Lisleby
Skiold	0–1	Larvik Turn
Skotfoss	1–3 (a.e.t.)	Vålerengen
Stavanger	3–5	Flekkefjord
Strong	6–0	Clausenengen
Torp	2–4	Urædd
Tønsberg Turn	0–4	Odd
Vard	0–1	Viking
Vigør	2–0 (a.e.t.)	Ålgård
Replay
Ulf	0–2	Hardy

- Fredrikstad, Lyn, Djerv and Kristiansund had a walkover.

== Third round ==
Team 1	Score	Team 2
Brann	1–8	Skeid
Frigg	1–0	Djerv
Odd	3–1	Flekkefjord
Jevnaker	2–2 (a.e.t.)	Fram (Larvik)
Viking	2–0	Hardy
Kjelsås	0–2	Mjøndalen
Kristiansund	8–0	Veblungsnes
Larvik Turn	0–1	Vigør
Lillestrøm	8–1	Speed
Storm	3–1	Moss
Steinkjer	1–2	Neset
Ørn	2–0	Nydalen
Vålerengen	1–0	Pors
Urædd	3–1	Strong
Replay
Fram (Larvik)	2–1 (a.e.t.)	Jevnaker

- Fredrikstad and Lyn had a walkover.

== Fourth round ==
Team 1	Score	Team 2
Vålerengen	3–0	Fram (Larvik)
Fredrikstad	7–0	Storm
Vigør	3–2	Frigg
Kristiansund	1–3	Lillestrøm
Lyn	1–2	Ørn
Mjøndalen	2–1	Urædd
Neset	0–2	Odd
Skeid	4–5 (a.e.t.)	Viking

== Quarter-finals ==
Team 1	Score	Team 2
Odd	4–5 (a.e.t.)	Fredrikstad
Mjøndalen	4–2	Lillestrøm
Vålerengen	0–1	Vigør
Viking	4–0	Ørn

== Semi-finals ==
Team 1	Score	Team 2
Fredrikstad	2–0	Viking
Vigør	0–2	Mjøndalen

== Final ==
16 October 1938

Fredrikstad	3–2 (a.e.t.)	Mjøndalen
Larsen 5'; Brynildsen 40' (pen.); Ileby 110'	Report	Halvorsen 60'; Hval 63'

Briskeby, Hamar
Attendance: 12,000
Referee: Finn Amundsen (Lyn)

== See also ==
- 1937–38 League of Norway
- 1938 in Norwegian football
