= Tor H. Pedersen =

Norwegian footballer (born 1964)

Personal information
- Full name: Tor Herold Pedersen
- Date of birth: 14 February 1964 (age 62)
- Height: 1.85 m (6 ft 1 in)
- Position: Defender

Youth career
- Skarp
- Tromsø

Senior career*
Years	Team	Apps	(Gls)
1981–1994	Tromsø		
1995–1996	Skarp		

International career
1988	Norway	1	(0)

Managerial career
- 1995: Skarp (player-manager)
- * Club domestic league appearances and goals

Tor H. Pedersen (born 14 February 1964) is a retired Norwegian football defender.

Hailing from Bukta in Tromsø, Soleng joined Tromsø IL as a child and became a stalwart in central defense. He helped win the 1986 Norwegian Football Cup, and was also capped once for Norway. In 1995 he went into semi-retirement with two seasons for IF Skarp, the first as player-manager.

He settled as a banker in Tromsø.
