= Erik Nevland =

Norwegian footballer (born 1977)

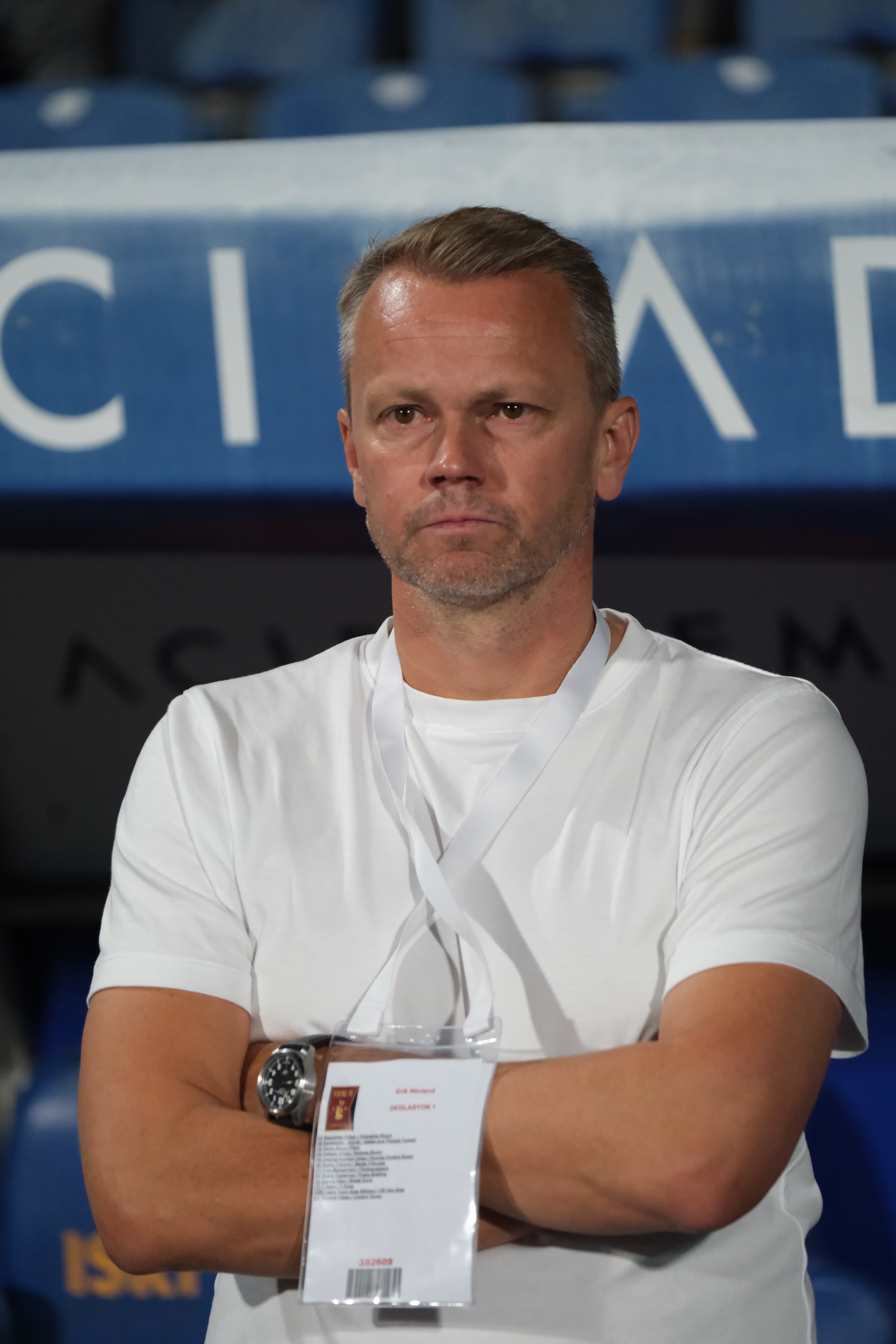
- Nevland in 2025

Personal information
- Full name: Erik Nevland
- Date of birth: 10 November 1977 (age 48)
- Place of birth: Stavanger, Norway
- Height: 1.78 m (5 ft 10 in)
- Position: Forward

Youth career
- Viking
- Manchester United

Senior career*
Years	Team	Apps	(Gls)
1995–1997	Viking	14	(5)
1997–2000	Manchester United	1	(0)
1998	→ Viking (loan)	8	(3)
1999	→ IFK Göteborg (loan)	4	(0)
2000–2004	Viking	113	(54)
2004–2008	Groningen	95	(43)
2008–2010	Fulham	52	(9)
2010–2012	Viking	54	(16)
Total		341	(130)

International career
1996–1997	Norway U20	3	(1)
1997–1999	Norway U21	22	(1)
2002	Norway B	2	(0)
2001–2010	Norway	8	(0)

Managerial career
- 2021–: Viking (sporting director)
- * Club domestic league appearances and goals

Erik Nevland (born 10 November 1977) is a Norwegian former professional footballer who played as a forward. He is currently the sporting director of Viking. He played for clubs in Norway, England, Sweden and the Netherlands, and earned eight caps for the Norway national football team from his debut in 2001. After retiring, Nevland worked as a car salesman.

== Club career ==
Nevland was born in Stavanger, Rogaland. He started his career at Viking, but in 1997 he was sold to Manchester United at the age of 19, before he had played a single first team match for the Norway side. What prompted Manchester United to sign him was a succession of hat-tricks in three games when he was on trial with them. His only goal for the United first team was in a League Cup match against Bury in October 1998. He never managed to establish himself in the United team, with a successful loan spell at Viking and an unsuccessful one at IFK Göteborg. He only ever made one league appearance for United, as a substitute against Southampton on 19 January 1998.

He returned to Viking on a permanent contract in January 2000, winning the Norwegian Cup in 2001 and scoring the two deciding goals in their famous UEFA Cup victory over Chelsea in 2002. He joined Groningen on a free transfer in November 2004, and went on to become a cult hero. In his first half-season for his new club, he scored 16 times in 20 matches. Nevland scored the first ever goal in Groningen's new Euroborg stadium.

On 27 April 2007, Nevland signed a new three-year contract with Groningen. In December 2007, Nevland was voted 'Groninger of the Year' by television viewers in Groningen, although having been born outside the Netherlands.

On 28 January 2008, he signed with Premier League side Fulham for a fee of €2.5 million (£1.85 million), plus a further €0.5 million (£370k) if Fulham retained Premier League status, which they did. On 3 February, he made only his second ever Premier League appearance when Fulham played Aston Villa at Craven Cottage.

After making over 50 league appearances for Fulham, and despite Roy Hodgson's wish to keep him at the club, Nevland once again returned to Viking in June 2010. He was assigned the role as captain.

== International career ==
He has eight international caps for the Norway national football team; his first cap was in 2001.

He also has 22 caps and one international goal to his name with the U-21 side. He participated in the 1998 UEFA European Under-21 Football Championship where Norway achieved a third-place finish.

== Later career ==
On 5 August 2021, Nevland was appointed sporting director of Viking.

== Career statistics ==
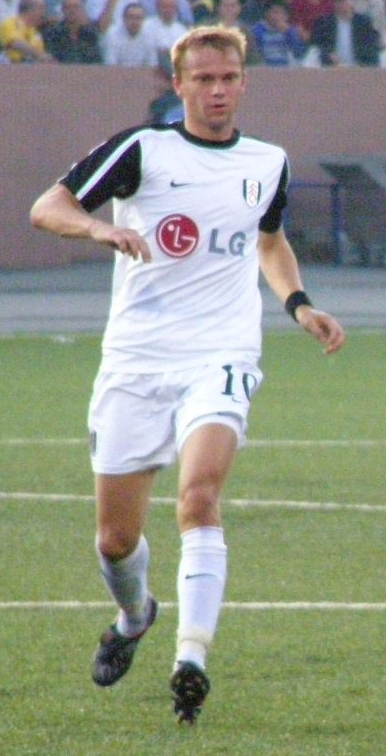
Nevland playing for Fulham in 2009

Club performance			League		Cup		Total	
Season	Club	League	Apps	Goals	Apps	Goals	Apps	Goals
Norway			League		Norwegian Cup		Total	
1996	Viking	Tippeligaen	1	0	0	0	1	0
1997	Viking	Tippeligaen	13	5	3	5	16	10
England			League		FA Cup		Total	
1997–98	Manchester United	Premier League	1	0	3	0	4	0
Norway			League		Norwegian Cup		Total	
1998	Viking	Tippeligaen	8	3	1	0	9	3
Sweden			League		Svenska Cupen		Total	
1999	IFK Göteborg	Allsvenskan	4	0				
England			League		FA Cup		Total	
1999–2000	Manchester United	Premier League	0	0	0	0	0	0
Norway			League		Norwegian Cup		Total	
2000	Viking	Tippeligaen	20	13	2	0	22	13
2001	Viking	Tippeligaen	25	14	6	3	31	17
2002	Viking	Tippeligaen	20	10	4	6	24	16
2003	Viking	Tippeligaen	25	11	4	1	29	12
2004	Viking	Tippeligaen	23	6	2	4	25	10
Netherlands			League		KNVB Cup		Total	
2004–05	Groningen	Eredivisie	20	16	0	0	20	16
2005–06	Groningen	Eredivisie	29	8	5	2	34	10
2006–07	Groningen	Eredivisie	27	13	1	0	28	13
2007–08	Groningen	Eredivisie	12	6	1	0	13	6
England			League		FA Cup		Total	
2007–08	Fulham	Premier League	8	2	0	0	8	2
2008–09	Fulham	Premier League	21	4	3	0	24	4
2009–10	Fulham	Premier League	23	3	1	1	24	4
Norway			League		Norwegian Cup		Total	
2010	Viking	Tippeligaen	12	6	1	0	13	6
2011	Viking	Tippeligaen	28	8	5	5	33	13
2012	Viking	Tippeligaen	14	2	1	1	15	3
Total	Norway		189	78	29	25	218	103
Total	England		53	9	7	1	60	10
Total	Sweden		4	0				
Total	Netherlands		88	43	7	2	95	45
Career total			334	130	43	28	373	158

== Honours ==
Fulham

- UEFA Europa League runner-up: 2009–10
