= 1986 Norwegian Football Cup =

Norgesmesterskapet i fotball for herrer

Tournament details
- Country: Norway
- Teams: 128 (main competition)

Final positions
- Champions: Tromsø (1st title)
- Runners-up: Lillestrøm

The 1986 Norwegian Football Cup was the 81st edition of the Norwegian annual knockout football tournament. The Cup was won by Tromsø after they beat Lillestrøm in the cup final with the score 4–1. This was Tromsø's first Norwegian Cup title.

The penalty shoot-outs, instead of replays in the second and third round were introduced because a strike by municipality stadium officials was postponed many first round matches.

== First round ==
Team 1	Score	Team 2
28 May 1986
Stranda	3–2	Hareid
Hødd	3–1	Førde
Åndalsnes	2–1 (a.e.t.)	Skarbøvik
Brumunddal	1–2	Vinstra
Overhalla	0–7	Steinkjer
Fram Skatval	0–4	Ranheim
Nessegutten	2–3	Namsos
Follese	2–2 (a.e.t.)	Ny-Krohnborg
Aalesund	2–1	Langevåg
Hemne	1–1 (a.e.t.)	Kristiansund
Kapp	1–4	Raufoss
Redalen	1–2 (a.e.t.)	Gjøvik-Lyn
Vang	1–12	Faaberg
Eidsvold Turn	1–4 (a.e.t.)	HamKam
Lørenskog	2–1	Strømsgodset
Tromsø	3–0	Skarp
Skjervøy	2–0	Kåfjord
Odd	4–1	Drangedal
Fram Larvik	3–1	Urædd
Tune	1–2	Fredrikstad
Jerv	2–0	Donn
Svolvær	2–1	Harstad
Slemmestad	2–2 (a.e.t.)	Lyn
Hof (Solør)	1–4	Kongsvinger
Råde	0–0 (a.e.t.)	Lisleby
Ringsaker	0–3 (a.e.t.)	Nybergsund
Vardø	1–0	Alta
Bjørkelangen	2–0	Bærum
3 June 1986
Sandefjord BK	7–2	Rygge
9 June 1986
Charlottenlund	0–4	Freidig
10 June 1986
Ørn-Horten	4–1 (a.e.t.)	Tjølling
Valder	0–0 (a.e.t.)	Vigra
11 June 1986
Træff	0–5	Molde
Jevnaker	0–5	Lillestrøm
Teie	1–0	Eik-Tønsberg
Moss	5–0	Borre
Mjøndalen	0–1	Åssiden
Vålerengen	4–0	Bøler
Skeid	3–0	Frigg
Sunndal	4–2 (a.e.t.)	Alvdal
Rosenborg	1–0	Nidelv/Falken
Landsås	2–5	Bodø/Glimt
Grand Bodø	4–2	Fauske/Sprint
Mosjøen	2–4	Mo
Stjørdals/Blink	2–1	Ekne
Viking	2–0	Figgjo
Kopervik	0–1	Haugar
Sola	2–6	Vidar
Orkanger	2–0	Strindheim
Os	2–1	Varegg
Djerv 1919	2–1	Randaberg
Sandviken	0–2	Brann
Kjelsås	6–0	Sprint/Jeløy
Fjøra	1–3	Sogndal
Staal	0–3	Bryne
Sødal	2–1	Klepp
Stord	2–3	Vard Haugesund
Fyllingen	4–1	Lyngbø
Drøbak/Frogn	3–2 (a.e.t.)	Asker
Narvik/Nor	1–3	Mjølner
Grane	2–4 (a.e.t.)	Start
Kvik Halden	1–0	Borgen
Snøgg	1–2	Pors
12 June 1986
Strømmen	2–0 (a.e.t.)	Aurskog
Replay: 4 June 1986
Kristiansund	4–0	Hemne
Replay: 11 June 1986
Lyn	1–0	Slemmestad
Lisleby	1–3	Råde
Replay: 17 June 1986
Vigra	1–2	Valder
Replay: 18 June 1986
Ny-Krohnborg	3–1	Follese

== Second round ==
Team 1	Score	Team 2
16 June 1986
Freidig	0–1	Rosenborg
18 June 1986
Åssiden	1–1 (3–4 p)	Vålerengen
Kongsvinger	4–0	Bjørkelangen
23 June 1986
Molde	1–0	Åndalsnes
Lillestrøm	3–0	Teie
24 June 1986
Haugar	0–1	Viking
25 June 1986
Stranda	0–1	Hødd
Lyn	2–1 (a.e.t.)	Moss
Sandefjord BK	6–5 (a.e.t.)	Ørn-Horten
Råde	0–1	Skeid
Vinstra	0–7	Sunndal
Bodø/Glimt	3–2 (a.e.t.)	Grand Bodø
Steinkjer	4–2	Ranheim
Mo	3–0	Svolvær
Namsos	2–1 (a.e.t.)	Stjørdals/Blink
Vidar	2–1	Ny-Krohnborg
Valder	1–5	Aalesund
Kristiansund	3–0	Orkanger
Os	2–3 (a.e.t.)	Djerv 1919
Brann	3–1 (a.e.t.)	Kjelsås
Nybergsund	0–2	Raufoss
Sogndal	1–0	Gjøvik-Lyn
Bryne	8–1	Sødal
Vard Haugesund	2–0	Fyllingen
Faaberg	4–1	Drøbak/Frogn
HamKam	10–1	Lørenskog
Vardø	0–2	Tromsø
Mjølner	6–0	Skjervøy
Strømmen	1–3	Odd
Start	2–0	Fram Larvik
Fredrikstad	2–1	Kvik Halden
Pors	3–0	Jerv

== Third round ==
Team 1	Score	Team 2
1 July 1986
Viking	3–1	Vidar
Djerv 1919	1–0	Brann
2 July 1986
Hødd	2–0	Molde
Lillestrøm	5–1	Lyn
Sandefjord BK	1–3	Kongsvinger
Vålerengen	2–0 (a.e.t.)	Skeid
Sunndal	1–2	Rosenborg
Bodø/Glimt	2–0	Steinkjer
Mo	0–1	Namsos
Aalesund	1–2	Kristiansund
Raufoss	2–2 (3–5 p)	Sogndal
Bryne	1–0	Vard Haugesund
Faaberg	0–4	HamKam
Tromsø	2–2 (4–2 p)	Mjølner
Odd	0–1	Start
Fredrikstad	2–1	Pors

== Fourth round ==
30 July 1986

Hødd	0–2	Lillestrøm
		Sognnæs 38'; Osvold 46'

Høddvoll Stadion, Ulsteinvik
Attendance: 1,500
Referee: Arild Haugstad

30 July 1986

Kongsvinger	1–0	Vålerengen
Engerbakk 21'

Gjemselund Stadion, Kongsvinger
Attendance: 1,800
Referee: Rolf Haugen

30 July 1986

Rosenborg	4–0	Bodø/Glimt
Brandhaug 12' (pen.), 86'; Svorkmo 35'; Wiggen 50'

Lerkendal Stadion, Trondheim
Attendance: 9,983
Referee: Kaare Lindboe

30 July 1986

Namsos	1–0 (a.e.t.)	Viking
Ertsås 107'

Kleppen Stadion, Namsos
Attendance: 2,230
Referee: Einar Halle

30 July 1986

Kristiansund	2–3	Djerv 1919
Solheim 75', 83'		Cheek 11'; Langeseter 28'; Helgeland 68'

Gressbanen, Kristiansund
Attendance: 1,700
Referee: Rolf Madsen

30 July 1986

Sogndal	3–0	Bryne
Nord 61'; Torvanger 81' (pen.); Christiansen 88'

Fosshaugane, Sogndalsfjøra
Attendance: 1,600
Referee: Thorodd Presberg

30 July 1986

HamKam	1–2 (a.e.t.)	Tromsø
Kristiansen 13'		Espejord 57'; Høgmo 115'

Briskeby gressbane, Hamar
Attendance: 2,971
Referee: Harald Hansen

30 July 1986

Start	3–1	Fredrikstad
Seland 48', 72'; Klepp 82'		Olsen 24'

Kristiansand Stadion, Kristiansand
Attendance: 2,554
Referee: Per Arne Larsgård

== Quarter-finals ==
27 August 1986

Lillestrøm	1–0	Kongsvinger
Osvold 29'

Åråsen Stadion, Lillestrøm
Attendance: 3,148
Referee: Thorbjørn Aass

27 August 1986

Rosenborg	1–0	Namsos
Sørloth 26'

Lerkendal Stadion, Trondheim
Attendance: 9,983
Referee: Kjell Nordby

27 August 1986

Djerv 1919	2–1 (a.e.t.)	Sogndal
Melkevik 56'; Cheek 109'		Skartun 87'

Haugesund Stadion, Haugesund
Attendance: 5,000
Referee: Erting Haugen

27 August 1986

Tromsø	2–1	Start
T. Johansen 19'; Forfang 47'		Mathisen 88'

Valhall Stadion, Tromsø
Attendance: 2,278
Referee: Arlid Haugstad

== Semi-finals ==
20 September 1986

Djerv 1919	0–1	Tromsø
		Høgmo 78'

Haugesund Stadion, Haugesund
Attendance: 6,514
Referee: Tore Hollung

21 September 1986

Lillestrøm	2–0	Rosenborg
Bjerkeland 57'; Krogsæter 89'

Åråsen Stadion, Lillestrøm
Attendance: 8,143
Referee: Svein-Inge Thime

== Final ==
26 October 1986
13:15 CET (UTC+1)

Tromsø	4–1	Lillestrøm
Solstad 2'; Espejord 7'; Jenssen 65'; Rismo 74'	Report	Bjerkeland 50'

Ullevaal Stadion, Oslo
Attendance: 22,000
Referee: Egil Nervik (Freidig)
