= Bergsvand =

Bergsvand is a surname. Notable people with the surname include:

- Guro Bergsvand (born 1994), Norwegian footballer
- Jo Bergsvand (born 1960), Norwegian footballer
