= Tore Nilsen (footballer, born 1960) =

Norwegian footballer

Personal information
- Date of birth: 10 May 1960 (age 66)
- Height: 1.87 m (6 ft 2 in)
- Position: Defender

Youth career
- 1967: Fløya
- 1968–1977: Tromsø

Senior career*
Years	Team	Apps	(Gls)
1977–1992	Tromsø		
- * Club domestic league appearances and goals

Tore Nilsen (born 10 May 1960) is a retired Norwegian football defender.

Hailing from Dramsvegen in Tromsø, Soleng joined Tromsø IL as an eight-year old and after making his first-team debut in 1977 he became a stalwart in central defense. He helped win the 1986 Norwegian Football Cup. A one-club man, he amassed 384 games across all competitions, and also had a brother Bjørn Nilsen who played two games for Tromsø.
