= Slemmestad IF =

Norwegian football club

- Full name: Slemmestad Idrettsforening
- Founded: 27 June 1914
- Ground: Slemmestad stadion, Slemmestad
- League: Fifth Division
- 2025: 10th

Slemmestad Idrettsforening is a Norwegian multi-sports club from Slemmestad, Røyken. It has sections for association football, team handball and floorball.

The club was founded on 27 June 1914 as IF Kvikk. The club took the name Slemmestad IF in the 1910s. The club was then a founding member of the Workers' Federation of Sports in 1924. In 1932, Slemmestad IF entered the Communist sport association Red Sport instead, leading to the foundation of Slemmestad SBK in the Workers' Federation. These then merged to form Slemmestad SK. Later, the name again became Slemmestad IF.

Before World War II, the club had active sections for football, skiing, athletics, wrestling and sport shooting. The team colours are white with black shorts.

In the Workers' Confederation of Sports, Slemmestad lost the first cup final in 1924, won the cup in 1925, and lost another cup final in 1933. After the Second World War, the Workers' Confederation of Sports was incorporated into the Norwegian Confederation of Sports, and Slemmestad was allowed to contest the highest league for men, the 1947–48 League of Norway. Finishing dead last in their group with only losses, Slemmestad was relegated.

The men's football team reached the second round of the cup in 1985, bowing out to Hamkam. After that, they followed with a string of reaching the first round. This happened in 1986, 1987, 1988, 1989, 1990 and 1991. Their most notable result came in 1986, when they held Lyn to a draw, which at that time meant a second leg. Slemmestad proceeded to lose 1–0 away. The team had spells in the Third Division, the fourth tier, first lasting until 1995, and then from 1997 to 2002 plus one standalone season in 2008.

The men's football team currently plays in the Fifth Division, the sixth tier of football in Norway. The club currently fields no women's team.
