= Biong Arkitekter =

Norwegian architecture firm

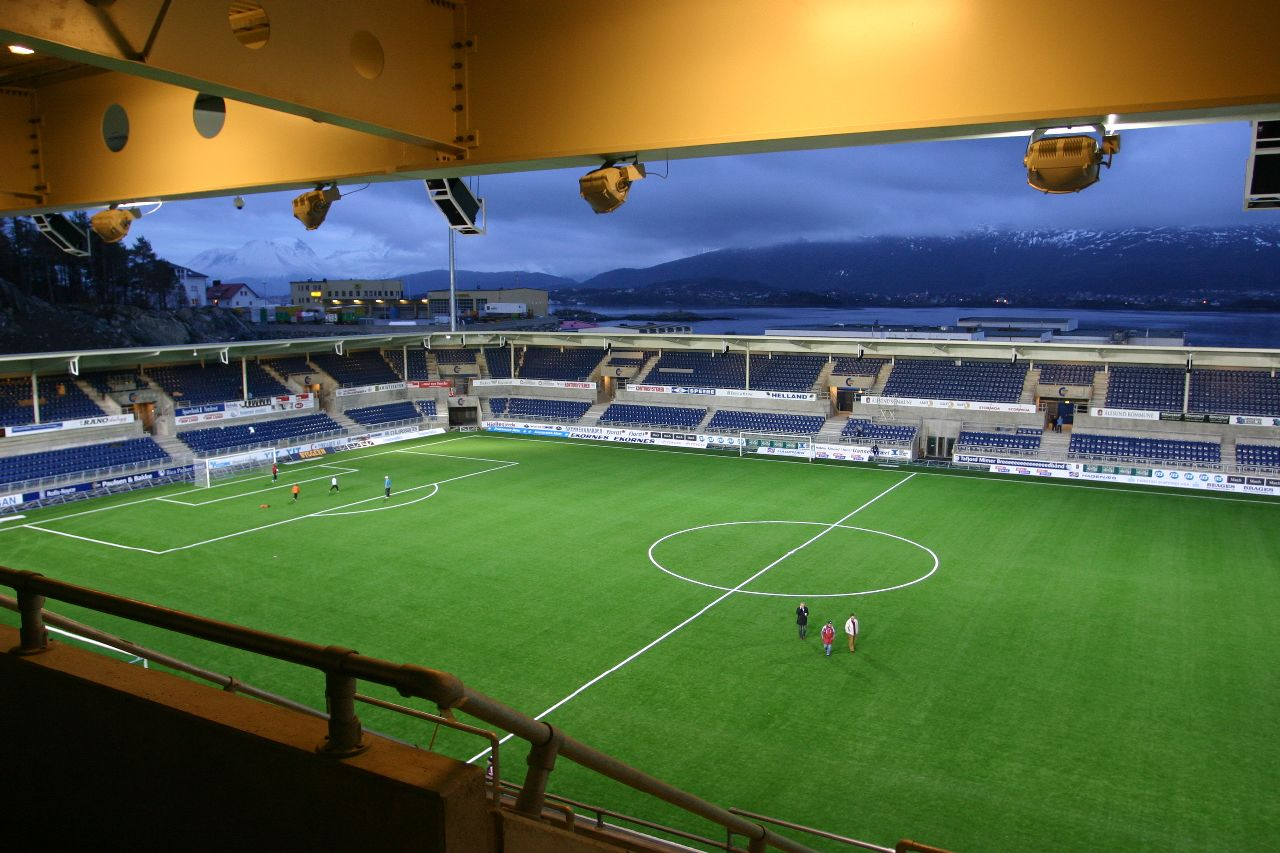
Color Line Stadion was designed by Biong Arkitekter

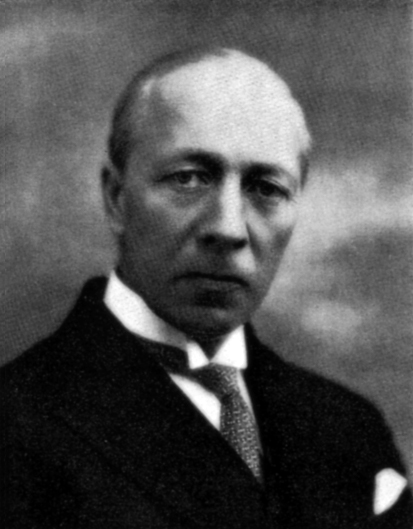
Kristian Biong ca 1930

Biong Arkitekter AS (previously known as Biong & Biong Arkitektfirma A/S); is a Norwegian architecture firm.

The company was established in 1900 by Kristian Biong (1870-1959) . In 1930, he and his son Henrik Biong (1904-2000) established the firm under the name Biong & Biong. Since the 1990s, the company has specialized in sports venues.

Among the buildings designed by Biong Arkitekter are the Kongsseteren, Ullevaal Stadion, Briskeby Arena, Color Line Stadion, Åråsen Stadion, Vikingskipet and Vallhall Arena.
