= The Royal Lodge, Holmenkollen =

Coordinates: 59°58′25.306″N 10°39′37.7″E

The Royal Lodge Kongsseteren
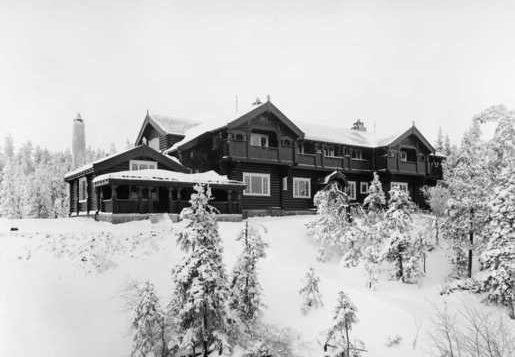
- Interactive map of the The Royal Lodge; Kongsseteren area

General information
- Type: Villa for the Norwegian royal family
- Architectural style: Neo-Baroque; Dragestil
- Location: Holmenkollen; Oslo, Norway
- Completed: 1911

Technical details
- Structural system: Timber Logs.

Design and construction
- Architect: Kristian Hjalmar Biong

The Royal Lodge or The Royal Villa (Norwegian: Kongsseteren, The King's Seter) is located in Holmenkollen in Oslo, Norway, and is in the Norwegian royal family's private possession. The property is used mainly in winter, and the royal family usually celebrates Christmas there, and stays at the Royal Lodge during the Holmenkollen Ski Festival every year.

King Haakon VII and Queen Maud received the Royal Lodge as a gift from the Norwegian people for the coronation in 1906. It was financed by a fundraising campaign. The villa was designed by architect Kristian Hjalmar Biong, who won the architectural competition with their project "Slot over Slot." Some of the details are taken from the Norwegian stabbur tradition, especially the corners of the building. Otherwise, the character of the neo-baroque style with some elements of Art Nouveau. The Baroque can be found particularly in the gable walls symmetrical plant ornamentation in strong colors, which is inspired by Norwegian wood carving art in the 18th century. The Royal Lodge was completed in 1911.

King Olav V often resided at the Royal Lodge. On 17 January 1991, while staying at the lodge, he became ill and died there.
