= 1938 Norwegian Football Cup final =

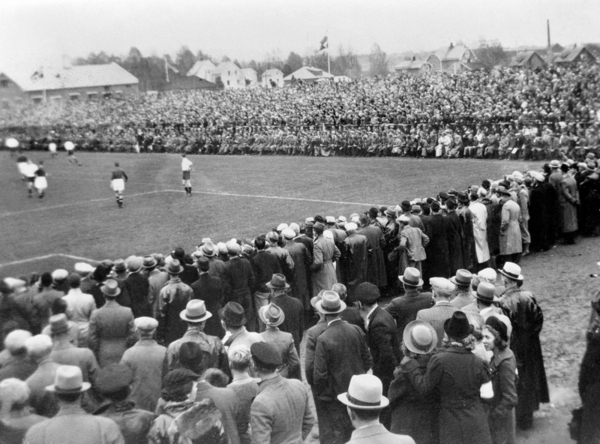
- Event: 1938 Norwegian Football Cup
Fredrikstad	Mjøndalen
3	2
- Date: 16 October 1938
- Venue: Briskeby gressbane, Hamar
- Referee: Finn Amundsen (Lyn)
- Attendance: 12,000

The 1938 Norwegian Football Cup final was the 37th final of the Norwegian Football Cup. It took place on 16 October 1938 at Briskeby gressbane in Hamar. The match was contested between Fredrikstad and Mjøndalen. The match was Fredrikstad's fourth and Mjøndalen's seventh appearance overall and Mjøndalen's third consecutive final appearance.

Fredrikstad won the match 3–2, after the game had ended at a 2–2 draw after ordinary time. Goals were scored by Thorleif Larsen after five minutes and Knut Brynildsen, on a penalty kick after 40 minutes for Fredrikstad; Mjøndalen reduced with goals by Trygve Halvorsen and Jørgen Hval after 60 and 63 minutes, respectively. The decisive goal was scored by Arne Ileby after 100 minutes, securing Fredrikstad their fourth cup title. 12,000 spectators attended the game, with still stands as Briskeby's record attendance.
