= Nils Solstad =

Norwegian footballer (born 1963)

Personal information
- Full name: Nils Arne Solstad
- Date of birth: 27 July 1963 (age 63)
- Height: 1.82 m (6 ft 0 in)
- Position: Defender

Youth career
- Fløya

Senior career*
Years	Team	Apps	(Gls)
1980	Fløya	1	(0)
1981–1993	Tromsø		
1997	Porsanger		

Managerial career
- 1997: Porsanger
- 1999–2000: Tromsø (assistant, junior)
- 2000: Skarp
- 2002: Skarp
- Tromsø (scout)
- * Club domestic league appearances and goals

Nils Solstad (born 27 July 1963) is a retired Norwegian football defender.

Hailing from Mortensnes in Tromsø, Solstad played youth football for IF Fløya and got one senior match before moving to Tromsø IL in 1981. He made his debut in 1982 and became a stalwart until his retirement after the 1993 season. He helped win the 1986 Norwegian Football Cup.

In 1997 he was player-manager of Porsanger IL. He later coached Tromsø IL's junior team and IF Skarp in two terms, first in the latter half of 2000 together with Trond Johansen, then in 2002 until he resigned in August that year. He returned to Tromsø IL and their scouting program Barents Fotball Academy.
