= Cato Erstad =

Norwegian footballer (born 1964)

Personal information
- Full name: Stig Cato Erstad
- Date of birth: 31 January 1964 (age 62)
- Place of birth: Hamar, Norway
- Position: Defender

Senior career*
Years	Team	Apps	(Gls)
–1981	Hamar		
1982–1994	Hamkam		
1995	Gjøvik-Lyn		
1996	Vang		

International career
1980	Norway U16	2	(0)
1981	Norway U19	2	(0)
1982–1985	Norway U21	16	(1)
1987	Norway	1	(0)

Managerial career
- 1996: Vang (player-manager)
- 1997–1998: Hamkam (assistant)
- * Club domestic league appearances and goals

Cato Erstad (born 31 January 1964) is a Norwegian footballer.

== Football career ==
Erstad played on the fourth tier for Hamar IL before joining Hamarkameratene in 1982. He made his senior debut for Hamkam in April 1982, scoring in his debut against Moss. He played in one match for the Norway national football team in 1987.

After the 1994 season, he left Hamkam and signed for fellow Mjøsa club Gjøvik-Lyn, who harbored ambitions to play on the second tier by 1998. He held the record in Hamkam for most games played, 506 matches across all competitions.

Ahead of the 1996 season he was announced as player-manager of Vang FL, the club having suffered relegation from the 1995 3. divisjon. Erstad stated that 90% of the player base changed from the previous season to the next.

After Erstad steered Vang to win re-promotion to the 1997 3. divisjon, the coach went on to Hamkam ahead of the 1997 season, where he would coach the B team. After Hamkam's manager Ivar Hoff left in May 1997, Erstad took on the role as assistant manager. Stein Kollshaugen took over Erstad's old job. In June 1998, both were relieved of their positions.

== Bandy ==
Erstad also played bandy for Hamar IL, and captained the boys' national team.
