= Tore Rismo =

Norwegian footballer (born 1961)

Personal information
- Date of birth: 29 January 1961 (age 65)
- Height: 1.80 m (5 ft 11 in)
- Position: Midfielder

Youth career
- Sørreisa

Senior career*
Years	Team	Apps	(Gls)
–1982	Sørreisa		
1983	Mjølner		
1984–1990	Tromsø		

Managerial career
- Tromsø (junior coach, director of sports, player developer, managing director)
- 1993: Tromsdalen
- * Club domestic league appearances and goals

Tore Rismo (born 29 January 1961) is a retired Norwegian football midfielder.

Hailing from Sørreisa Municipality, he lived with his family in Belgium from age 12 to 15, then returned home and started playing senior football for Sørreisa IL. After one season in FK Mjølner he studied at the University of Tromsø and played for Tromsø IL between 1984 and 1990. He helped win the 1986 Norwegian Football Cup.
