= Tjuvholmen, Hedmark =

Peninsula in Norway

Geography of Tjuvholmen
- Coordinates: 60°47′18″N 11°04′23″E
- Terrain: Coastal

Tjuvholmen is a peninsula penetrating Mjøsa in Hamar, Norway. It is largely a recreational area and features a marina.
