= Henning Bjarnøy =

Norwegian footballer (born 1964)

Personal information
- Date of birth: 16 April 1964 (age 62)
- Position: Forward

International career
Years	Team	Apps	(Gls)
1983–1984	Norway	6	(1)

Henning Bjarnøy (born 16 April 1964) is a Norwegian footballer. He played in six matches for the Norway national football team from 1983 to 1984.
