= Svein Grøndalen =

Norwegian footballer (born 1955)

Personal information
- Full name: Svein Grøndalen
- Date of birth: 8 February 1955 (age 71)
- Place of birth: Halden, Norway

Youth career
- Kvik Halden
- –1971: Raufoss

Senior career*
Years	Team	Apps	(Gls)
1971–1974	Raufoss		
1975–1980	Rosenborg	123	(6)
1981–1984	Moss	84	(3)
1985–1986	Ås		
1987	Moss	4	(0)

International career
1973–1984	Norway	77	(0)
- * Club domestic league appearances and goals

Svein Grøndalen (born 8 February 1955) is a Norwegian former footballer.

He was born in Halden, and as a youngster, he lived in Halden, Drammen, Halden again, and Hunndalen. He played youth football for Kvik Halden and Raufoss, and senior football for Raufoss, Rosenborg, Moss, and Ås. In total, he got 77 caps for Norway, between 1973 and 1984.

Grøndalen played left back or central defender and was noted for his "physical" style of play. Many people remember him best for a brutal tackle that injured Swede Ralf Edström during a 1977 international match. He is also remembered for missing a World Cup qualification match due to a bizarre injury, while running in the forest before the game Grøndalen ran into a moose and injured himself so badly he couldn't play the next game.

He took education at the Norwegian Institute of Technology.
