= Lists of one-club men =

List of one-club men may refer to:

- List of one-club men in association football
- List of one-club men in rugby league
- List of Major League Baseball players who spent their entire career with one franchise
- List of National Football League players who spent their entire career with one franchise
- List of NBA players who have spent their entire career with one franchise
- List of NHL players who spent their entire career with one franchise
