= Hans Deunk =

Norwegian footballer (born 1962)

Personal information
- Full name: Hans Jørgen Deunk
- Date of birth: 27 September 1962 (age 64)
- Place of birth: Moss, Norway
- Position: Defender

International career
Years	Team	Apps	(Gls)
1982	Norway	1	(0)

Hans Deunk (born 27 September 1962) is a Norwegian footballer. He played in one match for the Norway national football team in 1982.
