= Finn Amundsen =

Norwegian sports journalist

Finn Amundsen (29 May 1897 – 18 May 1958) was a Norwegian sports journalist, radio reporter, non-fiction writer and translator. He was born in Kristiania. He was journalist and later editor of the sports magazine Idrætsliv, until 1932, and from then sports editor of the newspaper Morgenbladet. He became legendary as radio sports reporter, in particular on skating. He was also active for SFK Lyn and refereed the 1938 Norwegian Football Cup Final.
