= Bjarne Sognnæs =

Norwegian footballer (born 1966)

Personal information
- Date of birth: 14 August 1966 (age 60)
- Position: Defender

Youth career
- Hakadal
- –1983: Løvenstad

Senior career*
Years	Team	Apps	(Gls)
1984–1995	Lillestrøm	185	(12)

International career
1982	Norway u-16	4	(0)
1983	Norway u-17	3	(1)
1984	Norway u-20	7	(1)
1986–1987	Norway u-21	8	(2)
- * Club domestic league appearances and goals

Bjarne Sognnæs (born 14 August 1966) is a retired Norwegian football defender.

He started his childhood career in Hakadal IL. Joining Lillestrøm SK from Løvenstad FK at the age of 17, he was a one-club man on senior level from 1984 through 1995. He also represented Norway up until under-21 level.

After retiring he has served on Lillestrøm SK's administrative staff and board of directors.
