= Jørgen Hval =

Norwegian footballer (1911–1992)

Personal information
- Date of birth: 8 February 1911
- Date of death: 24 September 1992 (aged 81)

International career
| Years | Team | Apps | (Gls) |
| 1933–1937 | Norway | 6 | (0) |

Jørgen Hval (8 February 1911 – 24 September 1992) was a Norwegian footballer. He played in six matches for the Norway national football team from 1933 to 1937. He was also part of Norway's team for their qualification matches for the 1938 FIFA World Cup.
