= Tor Inge Smedås =

Norwegian footballer (born 1957)

Personal information
- Date of birth: 25 August 1957 (age 69)

International career
Years	Team	Apps	(Gls)
1986–1987	Norway	2	(0)

Tor Inge Smedås (born 25 August 1957) is a Norwegian footballer. He played in two matches for the Norway national football team from 1986 to 1987.
