= Egil Johansen (footballer) =

Norwegian footballer (1962–2023)

Personal information
- Full name: Egil Flemming Johansen
- Date of birth: 30 April 1962
- Place of birth: Oslo, Norway
- Date of death: 19 September 2023 (aged 61)
- Place of death: Oslo, Norway
- Height: 1.74 m (5 ft 9 in)
- Position: Midfielder

Senior career*
| Years | Team | Apps | (Gls) |
| 1979–1982 | Bøler IF | | |
| 1983–1987 | Vålerenga | 104 | (25) |
| 1987–1988 | Beveren | 9 | (3) |
| 1988–1989 | Frigg | | |
| 1990–1991 | Vålerenga | 20 | (4) |

International career
| 1984–1987 | Norway | 12 | (1) |
- * Club domestic league appearances and goals

Egil Flemming Johansen (30 April 1962 – 19 September 2023) was a Norwegian footballer who played as a midfielder.

== Career ==
Johansen was born in Oslo on 30 April 1962. He grew up in the eastern suburb of Bøler, and joined Vålerenga in 1983. He spent the majority of his football career at Vålerenga, where he won two league titles (1983 and 1984). He also had a brief spell in the Belgian league where he played for KSK Beveren, and also spent two seasons at Frigg.

On international level, Johansen was capped 12 times for Norway, scoring one goal, which came in his international debut against Iceland. Three of those matches came in the football competition at the 1984 Summer Olympics in Los Angeles.

As a technically skilled midfielder who was also an Eastern Oslo native who had grown up as a supporter of the club, Johansen became a crowd favorite among the Vålerenga fans. He was nicknamed "Snapper'n" which referenced the fact that he had been an ice hockey goaltender in his youth.

== Personal life and death ==
In April 2023, Johansen revealed that he had been diagnosed with the terminal neuromuscular disease Amyotrophic lateral sclerosis (ALS) the previous spring. He died on 19 September 2023, at the age of 61.
