= Jo Bergsvand =

Norwegian footballer (born 1960)

Personal information
- Full name: Jo Kristoffer Bergsvand
- Date of birth: 25 October 1960 (age 66)
- Place of birth: Oslo, Norway
- Position: Midfielder

International career
Years	Team	Apps	(Gls)
1983	Norway	1	(0)

Jo Bergsvand (born 25 October 1960) is a Norwegian footballer. He played in one match for the Norway national football team in 1983.
