= Bård Bjerkeland =

Norwegian footballer (born 1961)

Personal information
- Full name: Bård Ivar Bjerkeland
- Date of birth: 8 December 1961 (age 64)
- Position: Defender

International career
| Years | Team | Apps | (Gls) |
| 1986–1987 | Norway | 3 | (0) |

Bård Bjerkeland (born 8 December 1961) is a Norwegian footballer. He played in three matches for the Norway national football team from 1986 to 1987.
