= Briskeby Stadion =

Stadium in Hamar Municipality, Norway

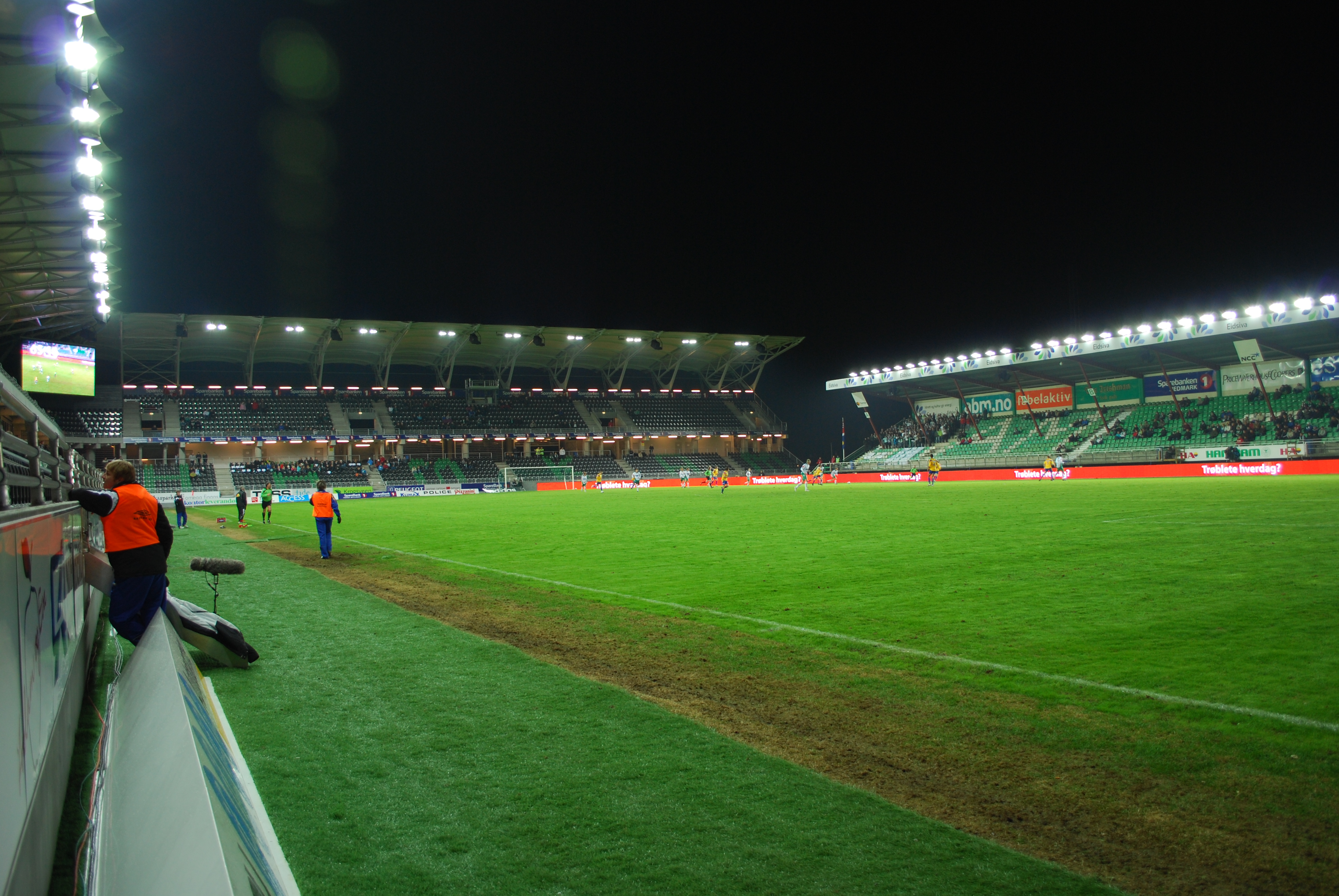
- Interactive map of Briskeby Stadion
- Former names: Briskeby gressbane
- Location: Hamar, Norway
- Coordinates: 60°47′44″N 11°5′32″E
- Owner: Hamar Municipality
- Operator: Hamar Sportsanlegg
- Capacity: 7,600
- Surface: Artificial turf
- Record attendance: 14,500
- Field size: 105 m × 68 m (115 yd × 74 yd)

Construction
- Groundbreaking: 26 April 1934
- Opened: 28 June 1936
- Cost: 32,036 kr (1934–36); 3.5 million kr (1984–86); 111 million kr (2007–08)
- Architect: Biong Arkitekter

Tenants
- Briskebyen FL (1936–45); Norwegian Football Cup final (1938); Hamarkameratene (1946–)

Briskeby Stadion, previously known as Briskeby gressbane, is an all-seater football stadium located at Briskebyen in the town of Hamar, Norway. It is home to the Norwegian First Division side Hamarkameratene (Ham-Kam) and is owned by Hamar Municipality. The venue has artificial turf, three stands, and a capacity for 8,068 spectators. It was used for the 1938 Norwegian Football Cup final—which saw the venue's record 14,500 spectators—and has also hosted five Norway national under-21 football team matches between 1984 and 2011.

Construction started in 1934, and the venue opened on 28 June 1936 as the first home venue for Briskebyen FL. The club merged with Hamar AIL in 1946 to form Ham-Kam. The new club has played since 1970, playing 22 seasons in the top tier, having been relegated eight times, most recently in 2008. Ham-Kam's record home attendance is 11,500, dating from a 1976 match against Lillestrøm. In 1984, the clubhouse was rebuilt with luxury boxes and a new 2,400-seat East Stand was built. The investments led the club into financial distress, and in 1993, the municipality had to purchase the venue to save the club. Planning of a new or upgraded venue started in 2001, construction started in 2007, and the first stage was completed the following year. It cost 111 million kr, having suffered large cost overruns.

== History ==
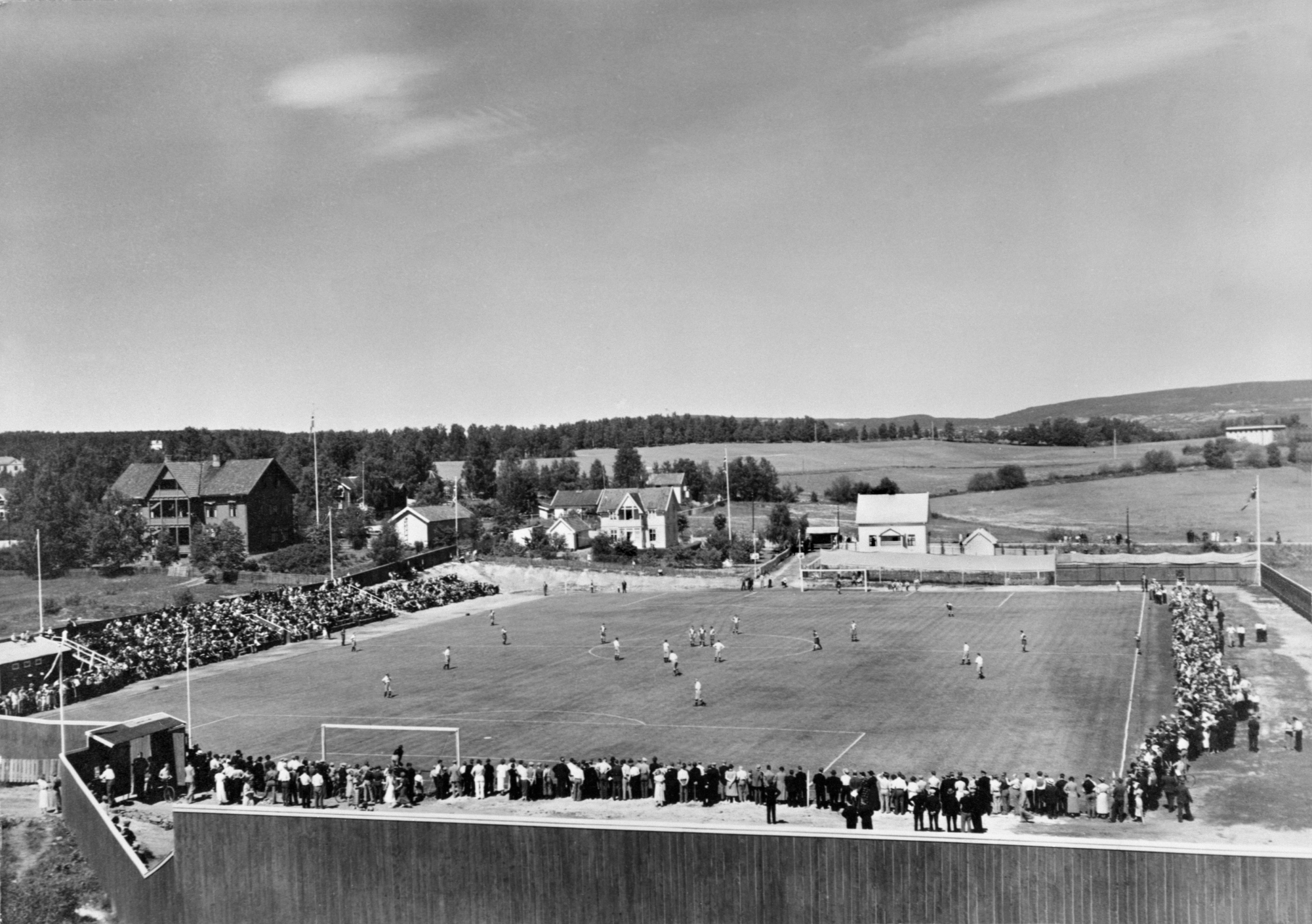
Briskeby during a match in the 1930s

=== Construction and early years ===
Freidig was established in 1918 as a local team for Briskebyen in what was then Vang Municipality. At the time there was a severe lack of pitches in Hamar, so the club was forced to sneak into unused venues and play until they were chased by the groundskeeper. The club was accepted as a member of the Football Association of Norway (NFF) in 1927, changing its name to Briskebyen FL. This forced it to formalize its pitch renting so it would have a single home venue for each season. In 1928 and 1929, it played at Vangsbanen, from 1930 through 1933 at Ottestad bane, and from 1934 at Hamar stadion.

As the club was dissatisfied with this arrangement, it launched plans to establish its own venues. First, it needed to secure a lot, and in the late 1920s, it set its eyes on a parcel of land owned by Hamar Jernstøperi. However, the lot was sold to Oplandske Kreditbank in 1930, and the club had to negotiate purchasing the lot from the bank. The club established a new committee to look into the stadium issue. Hamar IL was invited to become part-owner of the venue, but they chose to remain at Hamar stadion. As Briskebyen was not able to secure a partner to share the costs with, opposition towards the project grew within the club. Yet, the decision to build the venue was taken by Briskebyen FL's annual meeting on 15 April 1934, with construction starting on 26 April.

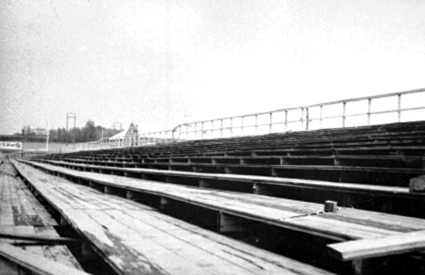
The venue's terraces in 1945

The venue was estimated to cost 26,500 kr. Financing included a 3,000 kr grant from NFF, 1,500 kr from the municipality and 1,800 kr from the club. The rest was secured through various charity events, 320 of 1,500-man-days being volunteer work and a 8,000 kr loan from NFF. Construction in 1934 consisted of removing 5,600 cubic meters (200,000 cu ft) of earthwork and laying sewer pipes. The following year, 200 cubic meters (7,100 cu ft) of rock was blasted, and the pitch was sown on 3 and 4 September. Construction of the terraces and dressing rooms took place in 1936. Work was not concluded until the morning of the inauguration match on 28 June 1936, when the last fence was mounted. Briskeby was the first grass pitch in Hedmark and was inaugurated with a match against Lyn, who won 4–1. The venue cost 32,036.28 kr, leaving the club with a debt of 18,688.93 kr. The venue was awarded the 1938 Norwegian Football Cup final, which required additional upgrades, largely conducted through volunteer work.

The venue was confiscated by the German occupation forces during World War II, who built a cold storage facility south of the pitch. In 1945, after five years of occupation, the pitch was in a detrimental state. The stadium received a major renovation, including a new pitch and the replacement of half the wooden terraces with concrete stands. The cold facility was converted to a clubhouse, and a basement was dug out and used as a changing room. In 1946, parts of Vang, including Briskebyen, were amalgamated with Hamar. The same year, Hamar Municipality signed an agreement with the club whereby municipal subsidies would cover the operating costs in exchange for the club allocating training time to other clubs.

The ground was also referred to as the Utstillingsplassen after the war, and it hosted motorcycle speedway for a short time. The track held the final of the Norwegian Individual Speedway Championship in 1954.

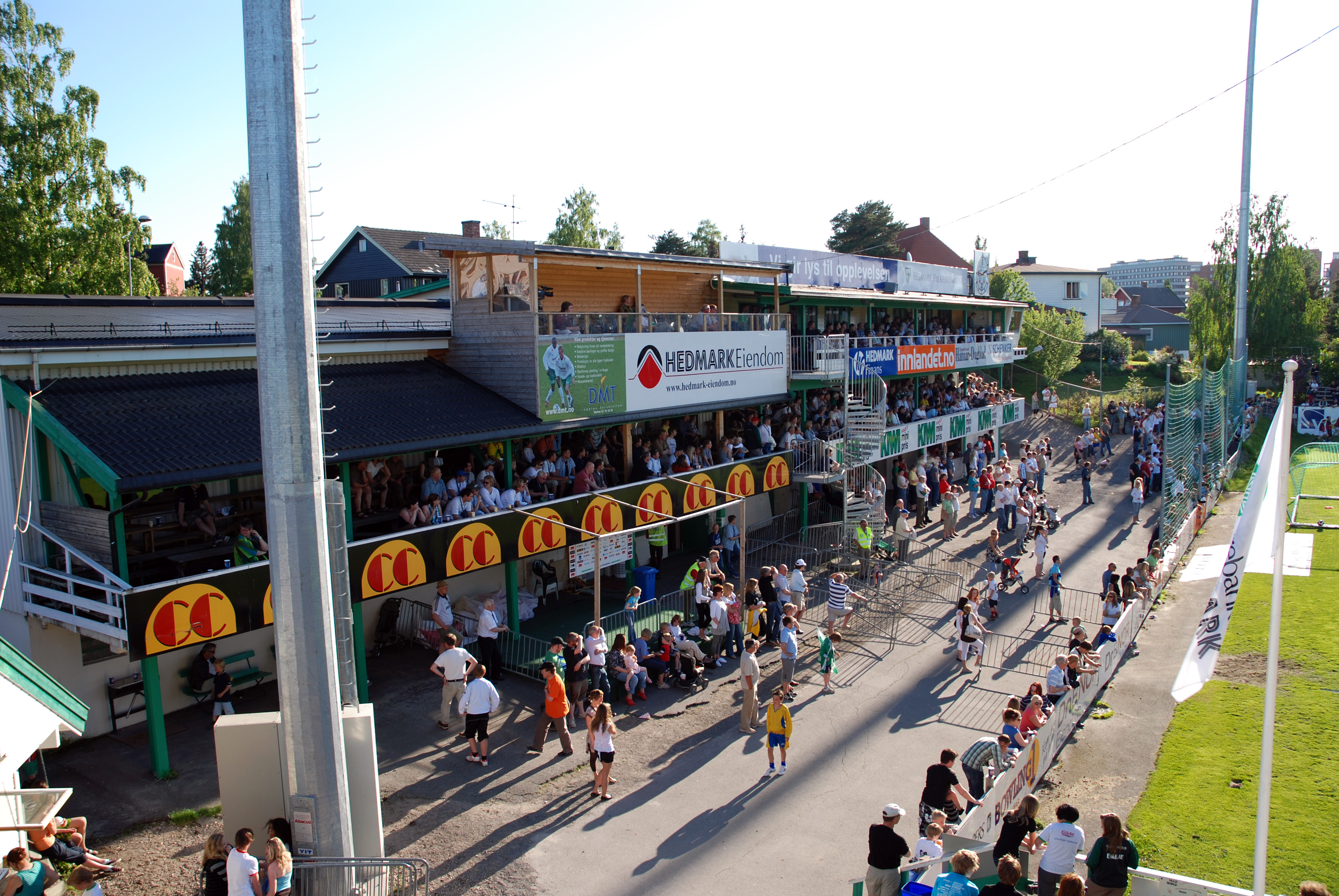
The old club house and luxury boxes installed in 1984

=== Debt and municipalization ===
In 1982, the club decided that it would build a new 2,400-seat stand on the eastern long side. A low construction cost was secured because the construction industry was going through a slump. The costs were covered by 2.5 million kr in national lottery grants and 2 million kr in loans, which were planned to be repaid through increased sponsor and ticket revenues from increased attendance. The upgrade also included a reconstruction of the clubhouse to facilitate luxury boxes. They were made available for sponsors, who were allowed to bring guests. The boxes and the vestibule became an important informal meeting area for the town's political and business elite.

The new stand became a financial burden for the club. Operating costs increased after Norwegian clubs were allowed to wage players from 1984. In addition, interest rates rose quickly, making the club unable to meet its financial obligations. At the same time, the club experienced falling attendance. In 1985, the club's auditor warned that the club was heading into financial distress. In 1986, the club spent 1 million kr to build terraces between the clubhouse and the pitch on the northern short side, and terraces on the southern short side. In 1990, Hamar Municipality gave Ham-Kam a grant of 1.7 million kr in an attempt to save the club's finances, in part because of the club's debt on the venue.

In 1993, Ham-Kam proposed selling the stadium, including its 1.0-hectare (2.5-acre) lot, for 6 million kr, to pay off its debt. In addition, NFF required that the stadium be renovated for 2 million kr. The club launched the sales plans to the municipality in September 1993, stating that if they did not purchase the venue, the club would probably be forced to file for bankruptcy. At the time, Lillestrøm and Brann were the only other top division clubs to own their own stadiums. Ham-Kam's three star players, Vegard Skogheim, Petter Belsvik and Ståle Solbakken, threatened to sign with other clubs within days unless the municipality saved the club.

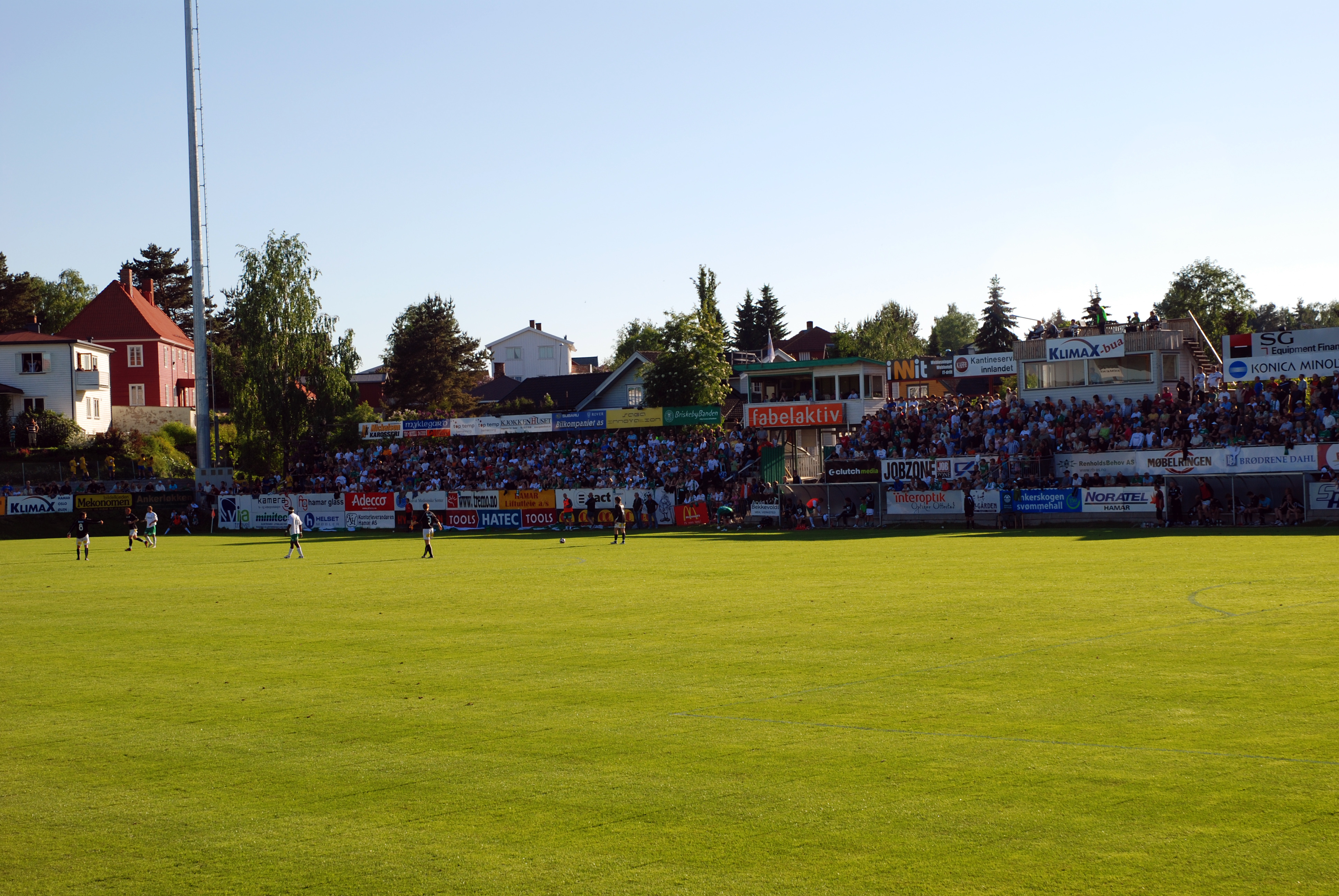
The old West Stand

On 20 October 1993, the municipal council voted in favor of purchasing the stadium. The proposal was supported by the Labour Party and Centre Party, who had 28 of 49 councilors, but opposed by the rest of the council. Along with two banks, the municipality established a limited company which would own the venue. The municipality and banks would pay for the club's debt of 5.4 million kr, and take over the stadium's operating costs of roughly 1 million kr per year. Ham-Kam would have to pay rent on the stadium. The transaction took place on 26 January 1994, and included a clause granting Ham-Kam the right to buy back the stadium at a later date. The municipality issued a loan of 4 million kr to Ham-Kam in 2003 to allow them to install floodlighting at Briskeby.

=== Stadion ===
By 2001 NFF was in the process of implementing new stadium requirements in the top leagues, and Briskeby would no longer be permitted to be used in the top tier. Ham-Kam entered an alliance with Totalprosjekt—a real estate development company working on Lillestrøm's Åråsen Stadion—who presented a concept to finance a new venue: The municipality would transfer property to a limited company jointly owned by the municipality and the major sports clubs, the real estate would be re-regulated to increase their value, and the company would use this capital to build a new professional and a new recreational stadium. Parallel with this, a municipal commission made a report that recommended a consolidation in the number of venues in town and the conversion of gravel and grass fields to artificial turf. The commission recommended that a new professional football venue be built either at Briskeby or Hamar stadion.

Hamar Sportsanlegg (HSA) was established in 2003 to execute the plan. It was owned 34 percent by the municipality, and 22 percent each by Ham-Kam, Hamar IL, and Storhamar Dragons. In 2004, Storhamar's share was transferred to Hamar Olympiske Anlegg, a municipal company which owns Vikingskipet Olympic Arena and Hamar Olympic Amphitheater. A report estimated the technical value of Briskeby to 6 million kr, while the sales price of the lot was estimated at 30 million kr. The municipal council voted on 18 February 2004 to transfer the ownership of the two stadiums to the new company. Ham-Kam rented the venues from HSA, with HSA's deficit for the first four years being covered by the municipality. Of the 20.8 million kr in value transferred to the company, 14.5 million kr was paid by HSA taking over the municipality's obligation to build a new athletics venue should Hamar stadion be closed, and 5 million kr was debt.

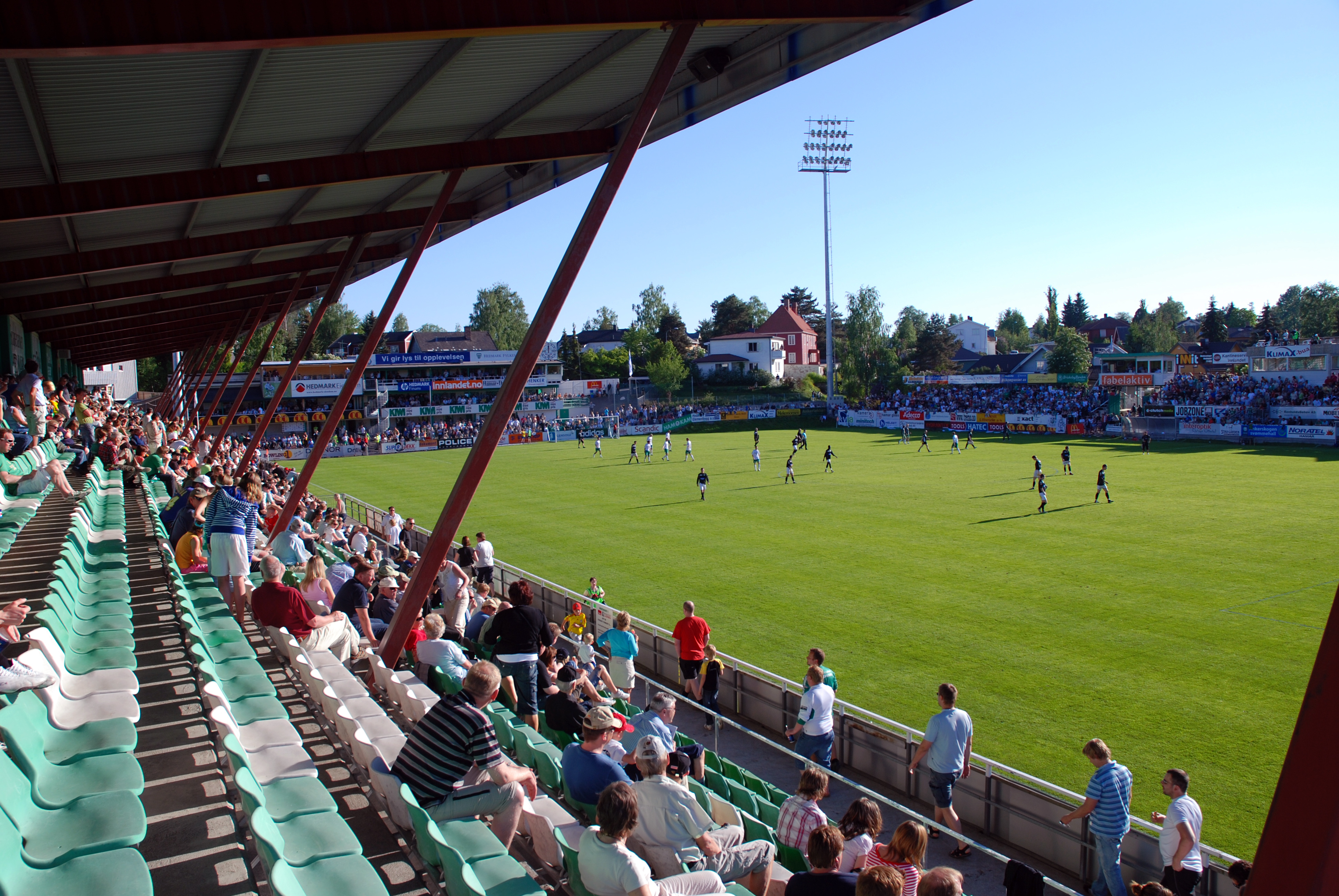
The venue in 2007

In October 2004, Totalprosjekt presented the concept Skibladner Stadion, which would have been located on Tjuvholmen, a peninsula which sticks out into Mjøsa. In addition to a 9,000-seat stadium, the project included a cultural center with an 800-seat auditorium and a 22-story hotel. However, Tjvuholmen is a popular recreational areas and a process to regulate the area as such had just been completed. The location would also cause problems for the railway, who wanted to expand Hamar Station. The Tjvuholmen project was rejected by the municipal executive committee on 8 December, and on 16 March 2005, the municipal council voted to continue working on a new venue at Briskeby. This caused Totalproject to leave the project.

In 2004, Biong Arkitekter was contracted to design the stadium, with Byggeråd as structural engineers. Five proposals for Briskeby were launched, estimated to cost between 61 and 150 million kr. Three of them retained the current alignment and would give a capacity of between 8,800 and 10,200 spectators, and two of these again contained commercial and residential properties within the stadium complex. The two other proposals involved turning the pitch 90 degrees, which would give the least encroachment on neighbor properties. The residents' association demanded that an impact study be made and that more specific plans be presented before municipal approval. The municipality concluded that neither was required. The municipal council passed a regulation plan on 1 February 2006, which involved building a 10,200-seat venue, but with the smaller of the two possible commercial property sizes. The residents' association appealed to the county governor, who rejected the appeal on 1 September.

The organizational structure of Hamar Sportsanlegg

At the time, NFF awarded an annual license to clubs, which permitted them to play in the top two divisions. This included a series of criteria that the home venue needed to meet. As Briskeby was severely substandard to the criteria, Ham-Kam was required to apply for annual exemptions. These were only awarded to clubs that were actively working on upgrading or building new venues. If an exception was not granted, the club would either be relegated to the Second Division (the third tier), or would have to play their home games at an approved stadium in another town.

In December 2006, HSA sold Briskeby to a new company, Briskeby Gressbane AS (BG), which was owned 50 percent each by Ham-Kam and HSA. Another company, Briskeby Eiendom 1 AS (BE1), was established and owned 66 percent by HSA and 34 percent by BG. The latter was also given 50 percent of the shares in Hamar stadion. BG was non-commercial and was to own the stadium itself, while BE1 was commercial and was to rent out the commercial property. The two shared the board, managing director, and accountant. In May 2007, NCC was awarded the contract to build the new venue by BG and BE1. Although NCC was 8 million kr more expensive than the cheapest bid, they offered four months shorter construction time. Briskeby's lot needed to be expanded, which was done by purchasing neighbor lots for 34 million kr. Hamar stadion and the neighbor lot Fuglsetmyra were sold for 295 million kr in June 2007, of which 9 million kr was paid to BG and another 175 million kr was a guarantee which would be paid after the lot was re-regulated.

Construction was financed through a loan of 218 million kr from Handelsbanken, which was secured on the revenue which would be generated from the sale of Hamar stadion and Fuglsetmyra. However, the bank was not willing to lend money secured based on the sales price of Hamar stadion, which was based on the re-regulation of the lot. The municipality was pressed for time by the possibility of NFF denying Ham-Kam the right to play at Briskeby. Hamar Energi Holding AS (HEH), which owns Hamar Municipality's share of Eidsiva Energi, had large assets. Both HEH and BE1 had as chair Hans Kolstad, who proposed that HEH could issue a guarantee of 75 million kr for BG and BE1, which was issued in September 2007. This allowed construction to start, but the project was still under-financed by 50 million kr. HEH therefore issued another guarantee the same month, for 58.75 million kr. Because of delays in the regulation work, HEH issued another two guarantees, 60 million kr in March and 25 million kr in June 2008.

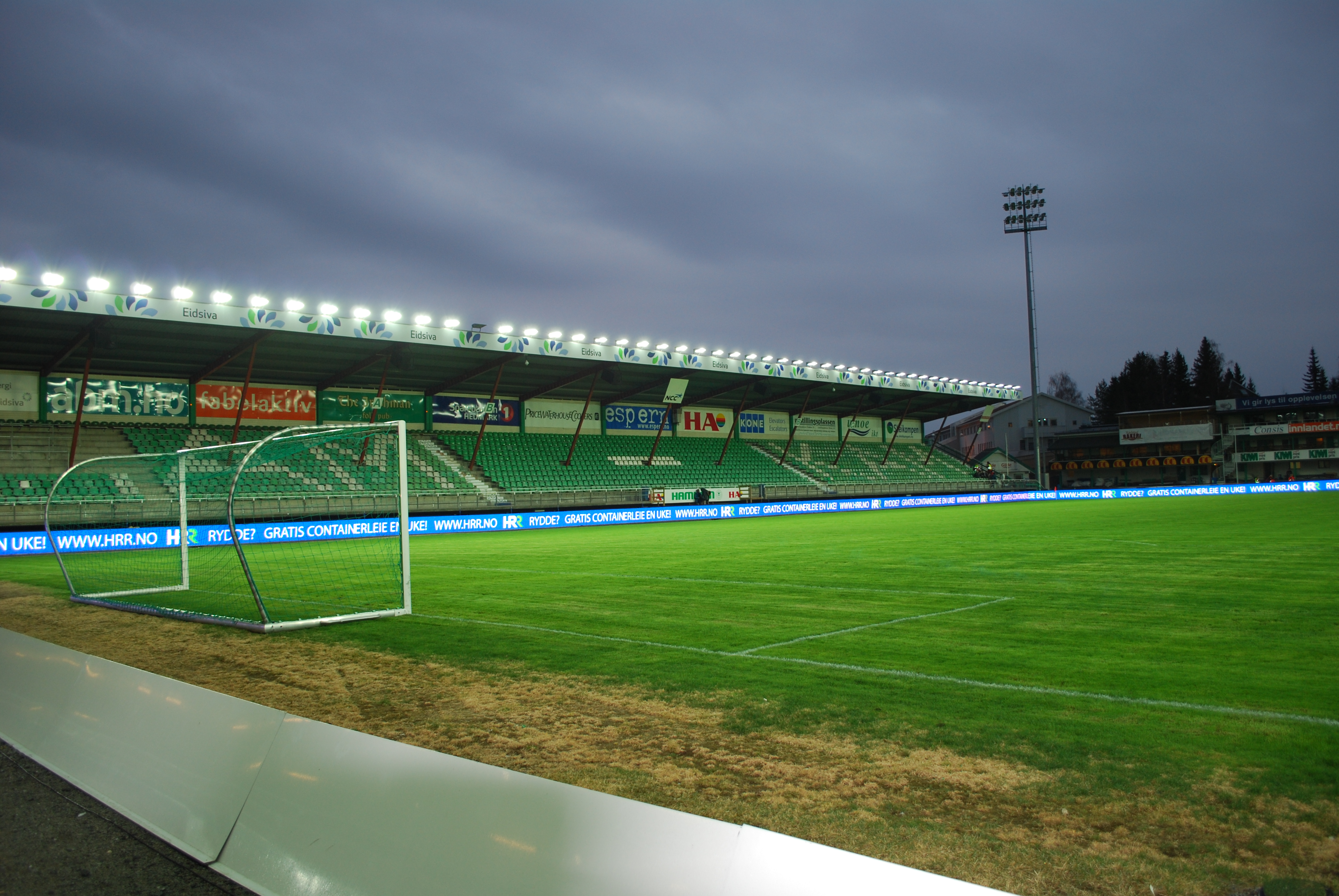
The East Stand after the reconstruction

In August 2007, the stadium was planned to be built in three stages, with a combined budget of 156.6 million kr. The first stage would involve the northern and western sides and cost 78.4 million kr, the second stage would involve the eastern side and cost 43 million kr, while the third stage would involve the southern side and cost 35.1 million kr. After construction started, BG changed two specifications, moving public rest rooms from the basement to the ground floor, and changing the angle of roof. Both of these gave increased construction costs and alteration of the architectural design plans.

During this entire period, BE1 was insolvent. The bank, therefore, required that the entire sales price of Hamar stadion be transferred to BG, even though 50 million kr was to go to the construction of Børstad Idrettspark (BIP). Therefore, Hamar Municipality decided to finance BIP to secure sufficient funding for Briskeby, essentially subsidizing Briskeby with a further 50 million kr. In 2007, BG paid 3.4 million kr in compensation to Ham-Kam for lost ticket sales during the construction time and for the club house, which would be demolished.

In 2008, Ham-Kam tried to sell the naming rights of the stadium for between 5 and 8 million kr per year, but neither of their main sponsors, Eidsiva Energi and Sparebanken Hedmark, was interested. The first stage of the stadium opened on 10 August 2008, after which further construction was terminated. Stage one cost 92.5 million kr to build and 19 million kr for purchase of real estate. By April 2010, BG had combined negative assets, debt and received grants of 240 million kr. Of this, 78 million kr was written off as bad debts to BE1, and 19 million kr was the purchase of lots. On 25 September 2009, Hamar Municipality bought HSA, BG, BIP and BE1 for 73,000 kr. In December 2009, the municipality increased the share capital in BG with 16 million kr and in BE1 with 32 million kr.

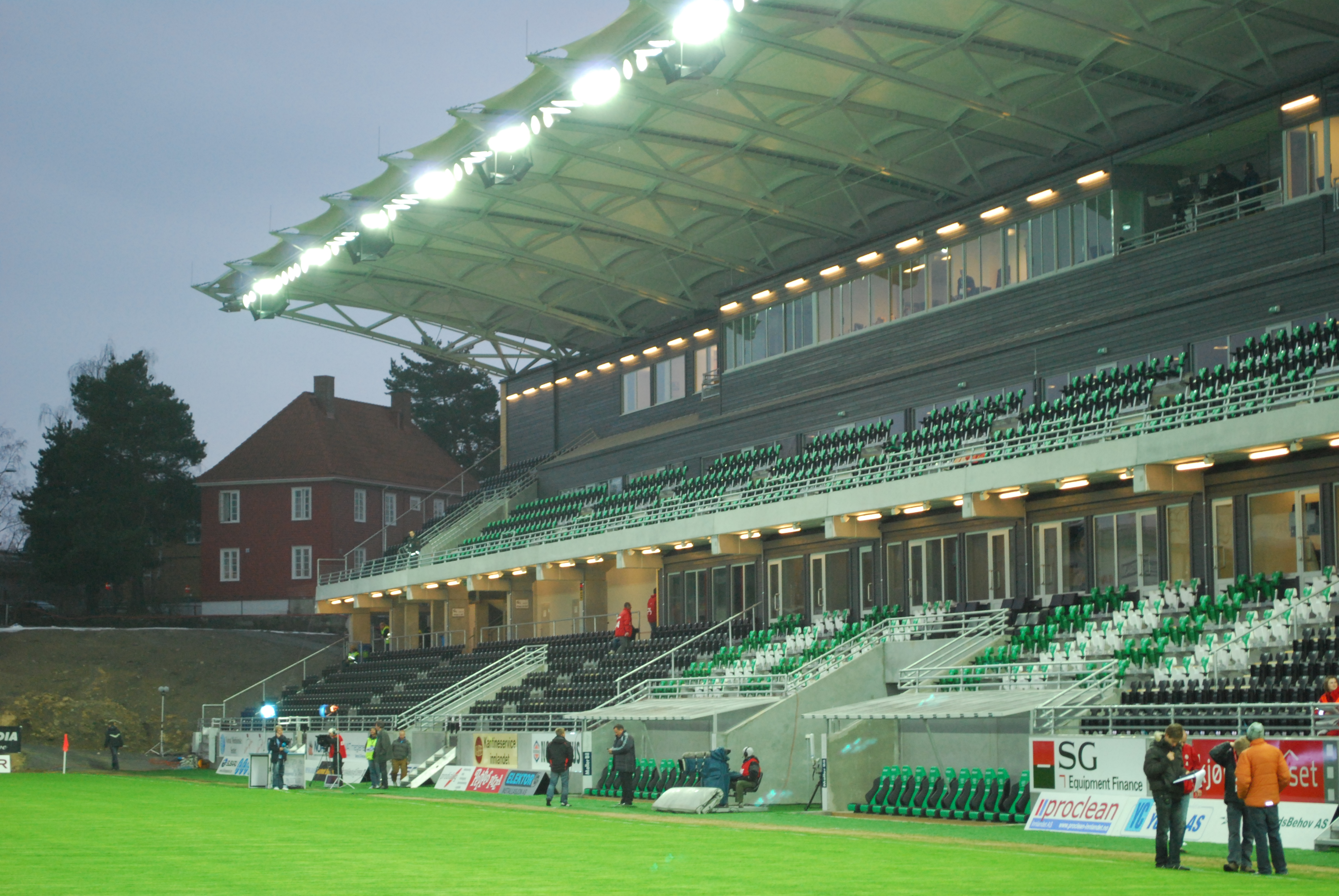
The new West Stand

With then opening of the venue, Ham-Kam rented 2,000 square meters (22,000 sq ft), consisting of 1,300 square meters (14,000 sq ft) of lounges and 700 square meters (7,500 sq ft) for its offices, for which the team played 2 to 3 million kr per year. In the 2010 season, Ham-Kam played in the Second Division, resulting in the entire VIP area remaining unused. Artificial turf was laid on the stadium in August 2011.

In August 2011, an investigation of the HSA affair was initiated by the municipality, with the investigation costing 7 million kr. The report concluded that a large number of illegal action had been taken in the process: HSA had used money reserved for sport for commercial development; irregular executive work in HEH and lack of correction were conducted after errors were discovered in 2007; important instructions from the municipal council were not followed; illegal executive work was undertaken in the holding companies; BE1 did not file for bankruptcy after it had lost its equity; the use of an unnecessarily complex company structure; violation on the laws of public sector procurements; violation on European Economic Area law on public grants; expensive consulting contracts, without tender, which gave the consultants too much influence on the process; and that the board composition in the companies was in violation with good corporate governance practices.

== Facilities ==
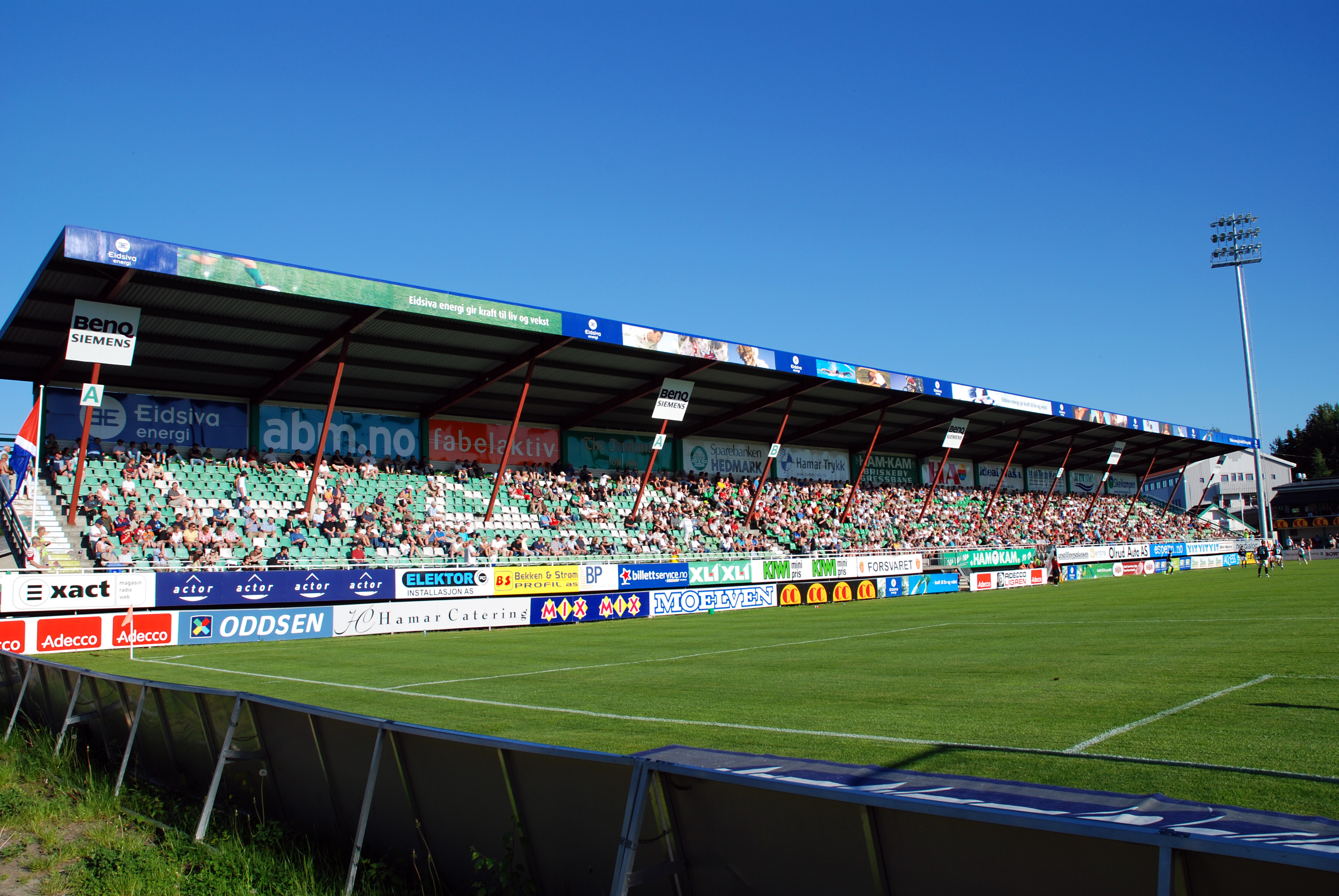
The East Stand opened in 1984

The new section of Briskeby has the same style and building materials as the two other main sports venues in Hamar, Vikingskipet and Hamar Olympic Amphitheatre, which were built for the 1994 Winter Olympics. The venue has capacity for 8,068 spectators and has club seating 600 people. The pitch is 105 by 68 meters (344 by 223 ft) artificial turf. Around the pitch are 180 digital advertising board. There are two 40-square-meter (430 sq ft) scoreboard screens. The stands have 13 concession stands, all of which are built to allow a view of the pitch while standing in a queue.

== Events ==
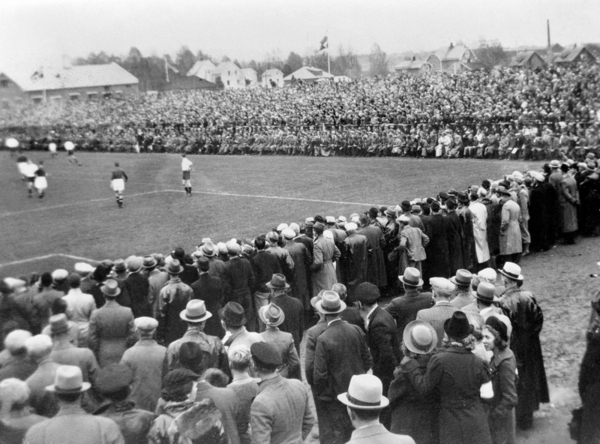
The record 12,000 crowd that attended the 1938 Cup final between Fredrikstad and Mjøndalen

The venue was home ground for Briskebyen from its opening. In its inaugural season, the club was newly relegated to Class B, as most of the club's effort had gone to building the venue. From 1937, the club again played in Class A. The venue was also used for matches where a mixed Briskebyen and Hamar IL played friendlies against foreign teams. No official matches were played during the Second World War. In April 1946, Briskebyen FL merged with Hamar AIL to create Hamarkameratene.

Ham-Kam remained at lower levels in the league system until the 1960s, when it was promoted to the Second Division (then the second tier) after the 1967 season. Ham-Kam was promoted to the First Division (then the top tier) ahead of the 1970 season. They have since played in the top league in the periods 1970–74, 1976–77, 1979, 1981–84, 1986–87, 1992–95, 2004–06 and 2008. The club's eight relegation from the top league is a Norwegian record. After the 2009 season, the club was further relegated to the Second Division, but returned to the First Division (now the second tier) in 2011. For a Ham-Kam match, the record attendance is 11,500, which dates from 27 May 1976 league match against Lillestrøm.

The venue hosted the 1938 Norwegian Football Cup final on 16 October 1938, where Fredrikstad beat Mjøndalen 3–2. The match attracted 14,500 spectators, which still stands as Briskeby's record attendance. Briskeby has hosted five Norway national under-21 football team matches, having played 0–0 against Poland on 28 August 1984, 3–0 against Switzerland on 2 June 1992, 2–1 against Switzerland on 16 August 2005, 2–1 against Hungary on 28 May 2010 and 1–4 against Sweden on 2 June 2011.
