= Kjetil Osvold =

Norwegian footballer (born 1961)

Personal information
- Full name: Kjetil Osvold
- Date of birth: 5 June 1961 (age 65)
- Place of birth: Ålesund, Norway
- Height: 5 ft 10 in (1.78 m)
- Position: Midfielder

Senior career*
Years	Team	Apps	(Gls)
1981–1985	IK Start	88	(7)
1985–1986	Lillestrøm SK	44	(7)
1986–1988	Nottingham Forest	7	(0)
1987	→ Leicester City (loan)	4	(0)
1988	Djurgården	21	(3)
1988–1990	PAOK	17	(1)
1990–1993	Lillestrøm SK	56	(4)
1993	Skeid Fotball	?	(?)

International career
1984–1989	Norway	37	(3)
- * Club domestic league appearances and goals

Kjetil Osvold (born 5 June 1961) is a Norwegian retired footballer. Between 1984 and 1989 he scored 2 goals in 37 caps for Norway. On club level he played for Start, Lillestrøm, Nottingham Forest, Leicester City, Djurgården, PAOK og Skeid.

A midfielder was known for his technical abilities, he performed a nutmeg on legend player Diego Maradona in a 1986 friendly match. People also remembered him for hitting the stadium clock on Åråsen stadium from a corner kick.

== Personal life ==
Osvold is the father of professional footballer Joachim Osvold.
