= IF Skarp =

Norwegian football club

Skarp
- Full name: Idrettsforeningen Skarp
- Founded: 30 June 1919
- Ground: Skarpmarka
- Chairman: Dag Vassbotn
- Head coach: Tore Rismo
- League: Third Division
- 2012: Third division / 12, 7th
Home colours	Away colours

Idrettsforeningen Skarp is a Norwegian association football club from Tromsø, which currently plays in the Third Division, the fourth tier of Norwegian football. The club was founded 30 June 1919 and its colors are black and white. It is the third best football team in Tromsø, after Tromsø IL and Tromsdalen UIL.

== Football ==
The men's team played in the Second Division for many years, but was relegated after the 2008 season. In 2010 it contested a playoff to win promotion, and succeeded by beating Kirkenes IF 7–4 on aggregate. In 2011, Skarp finished last in their Second Division group, and was again relegated.

=== Recent history ===
Season		Pos.	Pl.	W	D	L	GS	GA	P	Cup	Notes
2006	D2	12	26	9	2	15	46	73	29	2nd round	
2007	D2	11	26	9	2	15	45	70	29	1st round	
2008	D2	13	26	5	0	21	28	83	15	2nd round	Relegated
2009	D3	2	22	16	4	2	93	30	52	1st round	
2010	D3	1	22	19	1	2	98	22	58	1st qualifying round	Promoted
2011	D2	14	26	2	5	19	29	85	11	2nd round	Relegated
2012	D3	7	22	8	3	11	64	56	27	1st qualifying round	
2013 (in progress)	D3	5	18	8	2	8	48	44	26	1st round	

== Other sports ==
The club was formerly active in athletics. Kaare Meidell-Sundal won the Norwegian championships in hammer throw in 1939 (silver medal in 1938), and took a bronze medal in the shot put in 1939. Kaare Nerdrum also won a bronze medal in the 800 metres in 1930.
