= André Krogsæter =

Norwegian footballer (born 1961)

Personal information
- Date of birth: 12 May 1961 (age 65)
- Place of birth: Oslo, Norway
- Position: Forward

Senior career*
Years	Team	Apps	(Gls)
1977–1979	Årvoll		
1980–1986	Lillestrøm		
1987–1988	Frigg Oslo		

International career
1984–1985	Norway	4	(0)
- * Club domestic league appearances and goals

André Krogsæter (born 12 May 1961), nicknamed "Kråka", is a Norwegian football player. He was born in Oslo. He played for the club Lillestrøm, and also for the Norwegian national team. He competed at the 1984 Summer Olympics in Los Angeles.

He became Norwegian champion with the club Lillestrøm in 1981 and 1985. In 1985, he scored all four goals for Lillestrøm in the final against Vålerengen.
