= 1982 Norwegian Football Cup =

Norgesmesterskapet i fotball for herrer

Tournament details
- Country: Norway
- Teams: 128 (main competition)

Final positions
- Champions: Brann (5th title)
- Runners-up: Molde

The 1982 Norwegian Football Cup was the 77th edition of the Norwegian annual knockout football tournament. The Cup was won by Brann after beating Molde in the final with the score 3–2. This was Brann's fifth Norwegian Cup title.

== First round ==
Team 1	Score	Team 2
25 May 1982
Stag	0–3	Eik-Tønsberg
26 May 1982
Avaldsnes	0–6	Vard Haugesund
Eidsvold Turn	1–3	Sprint/Jeløy
Kristiansund	3–2	Træff
Sander	0–4	Strømmen
Sparta	1–3	Kvik Halden
Strindheim	0–2	Fram Skatval
Sunndal	2–0	Clausenengen
27 May 1982
Baune	0–3	Os
Bergsøy	1–0	Langevåg
Brumunddal	5–0	Jevnaker
Bryne	7–0	Varhaug
Bærum	2–1	Bøler
Donn	0–2	Vidar
Eid	3–2	Ørsta
Fana	3–0	Sandviken
Fram Larvik	0–3	Ørn-Horten
Fredrikstad	5–0	Navestad
Frigg	2–0	Rolvsøy
Faaberg	0–1	Raufoss
Geithus	0–5	Vålerengen
Gjøvik-Lyn	0–4	HamKam
Grand Bodø	0–0 (a.e.t.)	Stålkameratene
Grane (Arendal)	0–3	Start
Hald	0–1	Varegg
Hareid	0–3	Aalesund
Haugar	2–0	Sola
Jerv	0–0 (a.e.t.)	Vigør
Klepp	0–6	Viking
Kopervik	2–1	Djerv 1919
Leksvik	0–3	Rosenborg
Lillestrøm	2–0	Skiold
Lyn	2–0	Finstadbru
Lyngen	1–3	Kåfjord
Lærdal	0–2	Sogndal
Manglerud/Star	0–1	Kongsvinger
Mjølner	3–1 (a.e.t.)	Harstad
Mjøndalen	2–2 (a.e.t.)	Ullern
Mo	6–2	Sandnessjøen
Molde	3–0	Åndalsnes
Morild	1–2	Bodø/Glimt
Mosjøen	1–2 (a.e.t.)	Henning
Moss	6–0	Lørenskog
Namsos	0–3	Steinkjer
Nessegutten	4–1	Tydal
Nybergsund	0–1	Lillehammer
Odd	6–0	Birkebeineren
Røros	1–0	Folldal
Sandane	1–3 (a.e.t.)	Tornado
Sarpsborg	2–0	Kjelsås
Skarbøvik	3–1	Hødd
Skeid	5–0	Grue
Stein	0–2	Alta
Stjørdals/Blink	2–0	Falken
Strømsgodset	0–3	KFUM Oslo
Teie	2–2 (a.e.t.)	Drafn
Tromsø	3–0	Skøelv
Tynset	3–1	Sverresborg
Ulf	3–1	Egersund
Urædd	0–4	Pors
Voss	0–3	Brann
Østsiden	3–2	Drammens BK
Åssiden	1–1 (a.e.t.)	Råde
28 May 1982
Tjølling	2–1	Asker
Replay: 2 June 1982
Vigør	4–2	Jerv
Replay: 3 June 1982
Drafn	1–3	Teie
Råde	0–3	Åssiden
Stålkameratene	1–2	Grand Bodø
Ullern	0–1	Mjøndalen

== Second round ==
Team 1	Score	Team 2
22 June 1982
HamKam	2–0 (a.e.t.)	Brumunddal
Kåfjord	0–5	Mjølner
Lillehammer	2–4	Strømmen
Pors	4–0	Vigør
Sprint/Jeløy	0–4	Fredrikstad
Start	4–0	Ulf
Teie	2–1	Odd
Ørn-Horten	0–2	Mjøndalen
23 June 1982
Bodø/Glimt	2–0	Grand Bodø
Brann	7–1	Fana
Eik-Tønsberg	4–2	Tjølling
Fram Skatval	1–2 (a.e.t.)	Mo
Henning	0–3	Steinkjer
KFUM Oslo	0–3	Lillestrøm
Kongsvinger	7–1	Bærum
Kopervik	1–2	Haugar
Kristiansund	1–5	Stjørdals/Blink
Kvik Halden	2–1 (a.e.t.)	Østsiden
Os	2–1	Varegg
Raufoss	3–1 (a.e.t.)	Frigg
Rosenborg	1–0 (a.e.t.)	Nessegutten
Røros	0–2	Tynset
Sarpsborg	2–5	Moss
Sogndal	6–1	Eid
Sunndal	1–0	Bergsøy
Tornado	0–1	Molde
Vard Haugesund	1–4	Viking
Vidar	1–0 (a.e.t.)	Bryne
Vålerengen	2–1	Skeid
Aalesund	0–2	Skarbøvik
Åssiden	2–0	Lyn
24 June 1982
Alta	0–3	Tromsø

== Third round ==
Team 1	Score	Team 2
1 July 1982
Haugar	0–1	Brann
2 July 1982
Viking	1–0	Os
Mjølner	2–0	Tromsø
3 July 1982
Strømmen	3–0	Vidar
Mo	0–0 (a.e.t.)	Bodø/Glimt
4 July 1982
Mjøndalen	2–1	Teie
Moss	3–1	Kvik Halden
6 July 1982
Tynset	0–2	HamKam
7 July 1982
Pors	0–3	Start
Steinkjer	2–1 (a.e.t.)	Stjørdals/Blink
Lillestrøm	3–1 (a.e.t.)	Åssiden
Kongsvinger	3–2	Vålerengen
Raufoss	0–2	Sogndal
Molde	1–0	Sunndal
Fredrikstad	3–2	Eik-Tønsberg
Skarbøvik	1–0	Rosenborg
Replay: 8 July 1982
Bodø/Glimt	0–0 (10–9 p)	Mo

== Fourth round ==
25 July 1982

Sogndal	2–5 (a.e.t.)	Molde
Bakke 52'; Opseth 57'		Tennfjord 15', 105', 117'; Henden 37'; Ulvestad 99'

Fosshaugane, Sogndalsfjøra
Attendance: 1,824
Referee: Reinar Bjørnestad

25 July 1982

Fredrikstad	4–1	Skarbøvik
Andersen 8'; Lund 17', 79' (pen.); Ahlsen 66'		Skuseth 40'

Fredrikstad Stadion, Fredrikstad
Attendance: 2,633
Referee: Arlid Haugstad

28 July 1982

Bodø/Glimt	1–4	Brann
Thoresen 71'		Dalhaug 28'; Austvik 34'; Krogh 83'; Pedersen 87'

Aspmyra Stadion, Bodø
Attendance: 1,225
Referee: Frank Aase

28 July 1982

Steinkjer	1–2	Mjøndalen
Granamo 39'		Kortgaard 60'; Johnsen 64'

Guldbergaunet Stadion, Steinkjer
Attendance: 2,800
Referee: Einar Halle

28 July 1982

Lillestrøm	0–1	Moss
		Rafn 87'

Åråsen Stadion, Lillestrøm
Attendance: 3,078
Referee: Espen Larsen

28 July 1982

Mjølner	2–1	Kongsvinger
Normark 47' (pen.), 84'		Jansen 17'

Narvik Stadion, Narvik
Attendance: 692
Referee: Jens Peter Jensen

28 July 1982

Start	4–0	HamKam
Håberg 33'; Ervik 50'; Mathisen 69'; Aase 89'

Kristiansand Stadion, Kristiansand
Attendance: 2,300
Referee: Svein-Inge Thime

28 July 1982

Viking	2–0	Strømmen
Henriksen 7'; Risanger 69'

Stavanger Stadion, Stavanger
Attendance: 2,287
Referee: Erik Geelmuyden

== Quarter-finals ==
25 August 1982

Brann	4–2	Mjøndalen
Møller 50'; MacLeod 54'; Dalhaug 85'; Pettersen 89'		Johnsen 31', 44'

Brann Stadion, Bergen
Attendance: 16,286
Referee: Rolf Nyhus

25 August 1982

Moss	2–0	Mjølner
Kollshaugen 63' (pen.), 75'

Melløs Stadion, Moss
Attendance: 2,762
Referee: Frank Skadal

25 August 1982

Start	1–1 (a.e.t.)	Viking
Håberg 31'		Goodchild 43'

Kristiansand Stadion, Kristiansand
Attendance: 4,373
Referee: Thorodd Presberg

25 August 1982

Molde	2–1 (a.e.t.)	Fredrikstad
Ulvestad 47'; Hestad 112'		Ahlsen 12' (pen.)

Molde Stadion, Molde
Attendance: 3,572
Referee: Roald Håvåg

=== Replay ===
1 September 1982

Viking	4–0	Start
Kvia 7'; Goodchild 20', 84'; Johannessen 38'

Stavanger Stadion, Stavanger
Attendance: 8,614
Referee: Per Arne Larsgård

== Semi-finals ==
19 September 1982

Brann	3–1 (a.e.t.)	Moss
Pedersen 71', 97'; Pettersen 101'		Henæs 44'

Brann Stadion, Bergen
Attendance: 22,209
Referee: Svein-Inge Thime

19 September 1982

Viking	0–1	Molde
		Berg 52'

Stavanger Stadion, Stavanger
Attendance: 11,176
Referee: Jan Erik Olsen

== Final ==
24 October 1982
13:15 CEST (UTC+2)

Brann	3–2	Molde
Austvik 18'; Dalhaug 43'; MacLeod 60'	Report	Ulvestad 22'; Henden 36'

Ullevaal Stadion, Oslo
Attendance: 24,000
Referee: Torbjørn Aass (Brage)
