= 1984 Norwegian Football Cup final =

- Event: 1984 Norwegian Football Cup
Fredrikstad	Viking
Fredrikstad	Viking
3	3
- After extra time
- Date: 21 October 1984
- Venue: Ullevaal Stadion, Oslo
- Referee: Per Arne Larsgård
- Attendance: 23,668

Replay
Fredrikstad	Viking
3	2
- Date: 28 October 1984
- Venue: Ullevaal Stadion, Oslo
- Referee: Einar Halle
- Attendance: 15,993

The 1984 Norwegian Football Cup final was the final match of the 1984 Norwegian Football Cup, the 79th season of the Norwegian Football Cup, the premier Norwegian football cup competition organized by the Football Association of Norway (NFF). The final was played at the Ullevaal Stadion in Oslo, and opposed two First Division sides Fredrikstad and Viking. As the inaugural final match finished 3–3, the final was replayed seven days later at the same venue with the Fredrikstad defeated Viking 3–2 to claim the Norwegian Cup for a tenth time in their history.

== Route to the final ==
Fredrikstad			Round	Viking		
Frigg	6–1 (A)		Round 1	Madla	3–0 (H)	
Lillehammer	2–2 aet (H)	4–3 aet (A)	Round 2	Stord	2–0 (H)	
Brumunddal	1–0 (A)		Round 3	Vard	1–0 (A)	
Jerv	4–1 (H)		Round 4	Harstad	4–0 (H)	
Rosenborg	3–3 aet (H)	2–0 (A)	Quarterfinal	Strømmen	2–0 (H)	
Brann	4–2 (A)		Semifinal	Odd	1–1 aet (A)	4–0 (H)

== Matches ==
=== First match details ===
21 October 1984
13:15 CEST (UTC+2)

Fredrikstad	3–3 (a.e.t.)	Viking
Andersen 42'; Hansen 78'; Ahlsen 96'	Report	Audsen 22' (o.g.); Refvik 80'; Goodchild 107'

Ullevaal Stadion, Oslo
Attendance: 23,668
Referee: Per Arne Larsgård (Sandefjord)

Fredrikstad:
(Norway) Jan Erik Olsen
(Norway) Lars Sørlie
(Norway) Per Egil Ahlsen
(Norway) Jan Erik Audsen
(Norway) Hans Deunk
(Norway) Espen Engebretsen
(Norway) Terje Jensen	(substituted off) 61'
(Norway) Reidar Lund	(substituted off) 104'
(Norway) Vidar Hansen
(Norway) Jørn Andersen
(Norway) Atle Kristoffersen
Substitutions:
(Norway) Vidar Kristoffersen	(substituted on) 61'
(Norway) Morten Thomassen	(substituted on) 104'
Coach:
(Norway) Per Mosgaard

Viking:
(Norway) Erik Thorstvedt
(Norway) Isak Arne Refvik
(Norway) Per Henriksen
(Norway) Arild Ravndal	(substituted off) 110'
(Norway) Einar Sæbø
(Norway) Torbjørn Svendsen
(Norway) Ivar Hauge
(Norway) Tonning Hammer
(Norway) Kjell Lundal
(Norway) Nils Ove Hellvik
(England) Gary Goodchild
Substitutions:
(Norway) Knut Inge Svela	(substituted on) 110'
Coach:
(Norway) Svein Kvia

=== Replay match details ===
28 October 1984
13:15 CET (UTC+1)

Fredrikstad	3–2	Viking
Andersen 4'; Ahlsen 18' (pen.); Jensen 68'	Report	Lundahl 63'; Hellvik 69'

Ullevaal Stadion, Oslo
Attendance: 15,993
Referee: Einar Halle (Molde)

Fredrikstad:
(Norway) Jan Erik Olsen	(substituted off) 89'
(Norway) Lars Sørlie
(Norway) Per Egil Ahlsen
(Norway) Hans Deunk
(Norway) Morten Thomassen
(Norway) Espen Engebretsen
(Norway) Terje Jensen	(substituted off) 87'
(Norway) Reidar Lund
(Norway) Vidar Hansen
(Norway) Jørn Andersen
(Norway) Atle Kristoffersen
Substitutions:
(Norway) Tom Espen Fingarsen	(substituted on) 87'
(Norway) Arild Andreassen	(substituted on) 89'
Coach:
(Norway) Per Mosgaard

Viking:
(Norway) Erik Thorstvedt
(Norway) Svein Fjælberg
(Norway) Per Henriksen	(substituted off) 29'
(Norway) Arild Ravndal
(Norway) Isak Arne Refvik
(Norway) Torbjørn Svendsen
(Norway) Ivar Hauge
(Norway) Tonning Hammer
(Norway) Kjell Lundal
(Norway) Nils Ove Hellvik
(England) Gary Goodchild
Substitutions:
(Norway) Einar Sæbø	(substituted on) 29'
Coach:
(Norway) Svein Kvia
