= 1984 Norwegian Football Cup =

Norgesmesterskapet i fotball for herrer

Tournament details
- Country: Norway
- Teams: 128 (main competition)

Final positions
- Champions: Fredrikstad (10th title)
- Runners-up: Viking

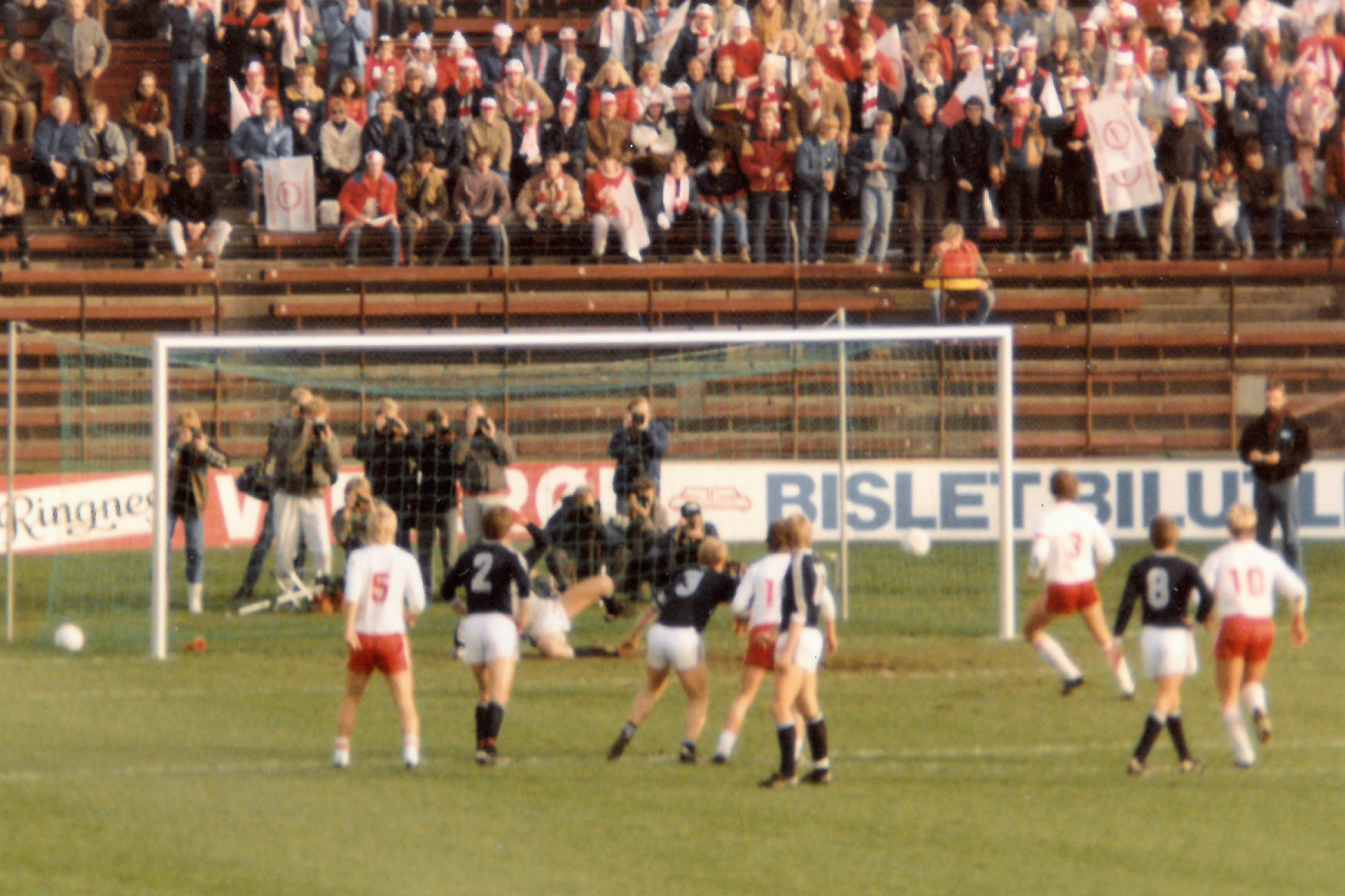
the replay of the Norwegian Football Cup final of 1984.

The 1984 Norwegian Football Cup was the 79th edition of the Norwegian annual knockout football tournament. The Cup was won by Fredrikstad after beating Viking in the cup final. It took a replay to decide the winner. This was Fredrikstad's tenth Norwegian Cup title. They had to wait 22 years for their eleventh title, in 2006.

== First round ==
Team 1	Score	Team 2
23 May 1984
Skjervøy	2–4 (a.e.t.)	Kåfjord
29 May 1984
Bærum	4–1	Kongsberg
Ny-Krohnborg	0–2	Fyllingen
30 May 1984
Andenes	1–1 (a.e.t.)	Harstad
Bryne	6–1	Ålgård
Eidsvold Turn	3–1	Lyn
Figgjo	2–1 (a.e.t.)	Vidar
Kongsvinger	7–1	Nordstrand
Kopervik	0–2	Egersund
Kristiansund	0–2	Sunndal
Lillehammer	3–1	Kjellmyra
Molde	3–1	Spjelkavik
Nordre Trysil	0–3	HamKam
Ranheim	1–1 (a.e.t.)	Steinkjer
Røros	2–0	Nybergsund
Sola	1–2	Klepp
Sprint/Jeløy	0–2	Skeid
Stag	1–3 (a.e.t.)	Pors
Stjørdals/Blink	0–4	Tydal
Åndalsnes	0–1	Clausenengen
Åssiden	3–0	Raufoss
31 May 1984
Brann	5–0	Florvåg
Brekken	1–2	Falken
Brumunddal	4–0	Grue
Bødalen	0–5	Lillestrøm
Djerv 1919	1–1 (a.e.t.)	Haugar
Fram Skatval	2–1	Kvik (Trondheim)
Frigg	1–6	Fredrikstad
Gjerdrum	1–2	Vålerengen
Grand Bodø	1–2	Bodø/Glimt
Halsnøy	0–2	Vard Haugesund
Jerv	1–0	Vigør
Jotun	1–4	Førde
Karnes	2–2 (a.e.t.)	Lyngen
KFUM Oslo	1–0	Gjøvik-Lyn
Kolbotn	1–2	Lisleby
Kvik Halden	5–0	Bækkelaget
Langevåg	2–1	Eid
Madla	0–3	Viking
Mjølner	7–1	Fauske/Sprint
Mjøndalen	8–0	Tønsberg Turn
Mo	3–1	Junkeren
Moss	2–0	Rygge
Namsos	1–1 (a.e.t.)	Nessegutten
Nanset	0–1	Strømsgodset
Norild	2–1	Tromsø
Odd	2–1 (a.e.t.)	Tollnes
Opphaug	1–5	Strindheim
Orkanger	0–1	Rosenborg
Sandefjord BK	1–7	Eik-Tønsberg
Sandnessjøen	2–1	Stålkameratene
Sarpsborg	1–2	Abildsø
Start	4–1	Donn
Stord	3–2	Os
Strømmen	2–0	Oppsal
Sørumsand	0–2 (a.e.t.)	Råde
Ullern	2–4	Faaberg
Varegg	1–2	Lyngbø
Vågå	0–6	Sogndal
Ørn-Horten	3–0 (a.e.t.)	Jevnaker
Aalesund	4–1	Bergsøy
Unknown date
Hareid	1–0	Hødd
Rollon	6–2	Skarbøvik
Teie	2–0	Larvik Turn
Replay: 5 June 1984
Haugar	6–0	Djerv 1919
Steinkjer	2–0	Ranheim
Replay: 6 June 1984
Harstad	2–0	Andenes
Lyngen	1–1 (0–3 p)	Karnes
Nessegutten	5–0	Namsos

== Second round ==
Team 1	Score	Team 2
13 June 1984
Abildsø	0–1	Moss
Falken	1–2 (a.e.t.)	Nessegutten
Sandnessjøen	3–0	Mo
14 June 1984
Bærum	2–2 (a.e.t.)	Odd
Clausenengen	1–1 (a.e.t.)	Aalesund
Eik-Tønsberg	2–3 (a.e.t.)	KFUM Oslo
Figgjo	1–2	Start
Fredrikstad	2–2 (a.e.t.)	Lillehammer
Fyllingen	0–1	Haugar
Førde	2–4	Brann
Faaberg	1–1 (a.e.t.)	Mjøndalen
HamKam	3–1	Teie
Hareid	0–4	Molde
Harstad	1–0	Bodø/Glimt
Klepp	0–4	Bryne
Kåfjord	2–1	Karnes
Lillestrøm	4–0	Eidsvold Turn
Lisleby	1–2	Jerv
Norild	0–1 (a.e.t.)	Mjølner
Pors	1–3	Ørn-Horten
Røros	1–3 (a.e.t.)	Brumunddal
Råde	0–3	Strømmen
Skeid	0–0 (a.e.t.)	Kongsvinger
Sogndal	4–1	Lyngbø
Steinkjer	3–0	Fram Skatval
Strindheim	6–0	Rollon
Strømsgodset	4–1	Kvik Halden
Sunndal	4–1 (a.e.t.)	Langevåg
Tydal	0–4	Rosenborg
Vard Haugesund	4–1	Egersund
Viking	2–0	Stord
Vålerengen	3–0	Åssiden
Replay: 20 June 1984
Odd	3–1	Bærum
Aalesund	5–0	Clausenengen
Replay: 21 June 1984
Kongsvinger	3–1	Skeid
Mjøndalen	4–2	Faaberg
Replay: 22 June 1984
Lillehammer	3–4 (a.e.t.)	Fredrikstad

== Third round ==
Team 1	Score	Team 2
22 June 1984
Molde	2–1	Sunndal
Vard Haugesund	0–1	Viking
28 June 1984
Brann	6–3	Sogndal
Aalesund	0–4	Lillestrøm
Ørn-Horten	1–0	Vålerengen
Brumunddal	0–1	Fredrikstad
Jerv	1–0	Kongsvinger
Rosenborg	0–0 (a.e.t.)	Mjøndalen
Moss	2–2 (a.e.t.)	Odd
Nessegutten	1–3	Strindheim
Haugar	3–5	Bryne
Start	3–2 (a.e.t.)	Strømsgodset
Harstad	5–0	Kåfjord
Mjølner	1–0	Sandnessjøen
KFUM Oslo	1–6	HamKam
Strømmen	3–2	Steinkjer
Replay: 3 July 1984
Mjøndalen	0–3	Rosenborg
Replay: 4 July 1984
Odd	2–1	Moss

== Fourth round ==
2 July 1984

Viking	4–0	Harstad
Hellvik 68'; Lundal 79'; Svendsen 88'; Ravndal 89'

Stavanger Stadion, Stavanger
Attendance: 1,237
Referee: Erling Haugen

4 July 1984

Fredrikstad	4–1	Jerv
Andersen 3'; Audsen 38'; Johannessen 57'; Ahlsen 89' (pen.)		Mathisen 75'

Fredrikstad Stadion, Fredrikstad
Attendance: 1,635
Referee: Thorodd Presberg

4 July 1984

Bryne	2–1 (a.e.t.)	Start
Herrem 40'; Totland 109'		Ødegaard 70' (pen.)

Bryne Stadion, Bryne
Attendance: 1,757
Referee: Svein-Inge Thime

4 July 1984

HamKam	1–2 (a.e.t.)	Strømmen
Stensrud 40'		Andreassen 90+2'; Fekete 112'

Briskeby gressbane, Hamar
Attendance: 2,401
Referee: Espen Larsen

25 July 1984

Odd	3–1	Strindheim
Seland 52'; Hogstad 59'; Halvorsen 88'		Jørgensen 98'

Odd Stadion, Skien
Attendance: 3,500
Referee: Jan Erik Olsen

1 August 1984

Mjølner	0–3	Brann
		Hadler-Olsen 4', 19'; Møller 85'

Narvik Stadion, Narvik
Attendance: 1,406
Referee: Jens P. Jensen

22 August 1984

Lillestrøm	5–1	Ørn-Horten
Sundby 8', 71'; Krogsæter 29'; Stordahl 68'; Vaadal 78'		Preus 53'

Åråsen Stadion, Lillestrøm
Attendance: 1,410
Referee: Kjell Nordby

22 August 1984

Molde	2–7	Rosenborg
Sorthe 41'; Dahl 85'		Hansen 20'; Eggen 23'; Angvik 28', 33', 49', 90'; Jenshus 52'

Molde Stadion, Molde
Attendance: 5,149
Referee: Steinar Aas

== Quarter-finals ==
5 September 1984

Brann	1–0	Lillestrøm
Fjeldstad 42'

Brann Stadion, Bergen
Attendance: 15,475
Referee: Sveinn-Inge Thime

5 September 1984

Fredrikstad	3–3 (a.e.t.)	Rosenborg
Lund 65' (pen.); Andersen 91'; Hansen 117'		Florholmen 36'; Dokken 101'; Strickert 115'

Fredrikstad Stadion, Fredrikstad
Attendance: 4,418
Referee: Rolf Nyhus

5 September 1984

Odd	2–0	Bryne
Moen 45', 65'

Odd Stadion, Skien
Attendance: 6,000
Referee: Per Arne Larsgård

5 September 1984

Viking	2–0	Strømmen
Hellvik 37', 90+1'

Stavanger Stadion, Stavanger
Attendance: 3,048
Referee: Kjell Nordby

=== Replay ===
19 September 1984

Rosenborg	0–2	Fredrikstad
		Andersen 18'; Engebretsen 31'

Lerkendal Stadion, Trondheim
Attendance: 12,414
Referee: Einar Halle

== Semi-finals ==
23 September 1984

Brann	2–4	Fredrikstad
Johannessen 7', 84'		Kristoffersen 14', 76'; Andersen 57'; Hansen 61'

Brann Stadion, Bergen
Attendance: 20,285
Referee: Rolf Haugen

23 September 1984

Odd	1–1 (a.e.t.)	Viking
Moen 35'		Hellvik 72'

Odd Stadion, Skien
Attendance: 8,852
Referee: Thorodd Presberg

=== Replay ===
28 September 1984

Viking	4–0	Odd
Hellvik 36'; Lundal 71', 90'; Fjælberg 76'

Stavanger Stadion, Stavanger
Attendance: 11,326
Referee: Thorbjørn Aass

== Final ==
=== First match ===
21 October 1984
13:15 CEST (UTC+2)

Fredrikstad	3–3 (a.e.t.)	Viking
Andersen 42'; Hansen 78'; Ahlsen 96'	Report	Audsen 22' (o.g.); Refvik 80'; Goodchild 107'

Ullevaal Stadion, Oslo
Attendance: 23,668
Referee: Per Arne Larsgård (Sandefjord)

=== Replay match ===
28 October 1984
13:15 CET (UTC+1)

Fredrikstad	3–2	Viking
Andersen 4'; Ahlsen 18' (pen.); Jensen 68'	Report	Lundahl 63'; Hellvik 69'

Ullevaal Stadion, Oslo
Attendance: 15,993
Referee: Einar Halle (Molde)
