= List of highest-scoring Eliteserien matches =

This is a summary of the highest scoring matches and biggest winning margins in the Eliteserien since its establishment as a one-group top flight in the 1963 season. The record for the biggest win is Rosenborg's 10–0 victory against Brann at Lerkendal Stadion on 5 May 1996. Lyn are the only club to have scored eleven goals in a Norwegian top flight game - in their 11–2 victory over Viking in Oslo on 28 July 1968. Strømsgodset are the third club that have scored 10 goals or more, a feat the team achieved in their 10–1 victory over Lyn at Marienlyst Stadion on 16 June 1968. Stabæk holds the records for both the most goals scored in an away game and the biggest winning margin away from home with an 9–0 victory over Sogndal at Fosshaugane in Sogndalsfjøra on 25 October 1998.

The highest scoring game is Lyn's 11–2 win against Viking on 28 July 1968.

== Highest scoring games ==
Goals scored	Date	Home team	Result	Away team	Goalscorers	Ref.
13	28 July 1968	Lyn	11–2	Viking	Dybwad-Olsen 30', 47', 49', 62', Berg 31', 40', 75', 87', 89', Johannessen 32', Austnes 68' Own goal 39', Knudsen 72'	
12	11 May 1972	Strømsgodset	9–3	Fredrikstad	Unknown×9 Nilsen×3	
11	16 June 1968	Strømsgodset	10–1	Lyn	S. Pettersen×5, Presberg×2, Olsen×2, I. Pettersen Dybwad-Olsen	
11	4 May 1978	Molde	6–5	Bodø/Glimt	Hestad×2, Hareide×2, Brakstad, Moen Unknown×5	
11	8 August 1982	Lillestrøm	7–4	Molde	Lund×2, Himanka×2, Giske 48', Sjåstad 53', ?' Malmedal, Lyngstad, Berg, Tennfjord	
11	9 October 1983	Brann	9–2	Viking	Giske×4, Dalhaug×3, Pedersen, Pettersen Unknown×2	
11	24 September 1995	VIF Fotball	9–2	Strindheim	Nysæther 3', 30', 59', 71', Aga 8', Bergersen 28', Kruse 50', Haug 60' Høsøien 51', Støbakk 85'	
11	22 July 2001	Lillestrøm	7–4	Strømsgodset	Berget 13' Powell 15', 24', 36', 60', Zane 43', Hansén 80' Flo 20', 62', Hanssen 45', 51'	
10	27 September 1964	Fredrikstad	9–1	Raufoss	Pedersen×3, Høili×2, Kristoffersen, Borgen, Own goal Unknown	
10	17 August 1965	Fredrikstad	7–3	Skeid	Unknown×7 Unknown×3	
10	20 August 1967	Steinkjer	2–8	Lyn	Unknown×2 H. Berg×4, Johannessen×2, K. Berg, Østlien	
10	30 July 1978	Brann	9–1	Steinkjer	MacLeod×3, Aase×2, Tronstad×2, Huseklepp, Pedersen Unknown	
10	27 April 1980	Lillestrøm	6–4	Lyn	Nilsen 28', Dokken 39', 46', Lund 43', 55', Erlandsen 70' Alexander 22', Bredesen 42', Solvåg 48', 85'	
10	7 September 1986	Viking	6–4	HamKam	Fjælberg 35', Hellvik 40', Antonsen 49', 71', 86', Enersen 58' Skogheim 51', 56', Erstad 74', Fjørtoft 89'	
10	1 October 1989	Vålerengen	2–8	Rosenborg	Christensen 76', 78' Jakobsen 10', 53', Løken 18', Brandhaug 55', 58', Sørloth 63', Svorkmo 82', 85'	
10	27 September 1992	Lyn	7–3	Sogndal	Finbråten 9', 51', Bergersen 32', 38', Bjerkeland 37', 76', Sørensen 54' Flo 40', 42', 67'	
10	17 October 1993	Brann	3–7	Lyn	Eskelinen 6', Soltvedt 87', 90' Michelsen 12', 82', Johnsen 35', Kaasa 51', 56', Kolle 73', Amundsen 76'	
10	2 September 1995	Rosenborg	9–1	HamKam	Brattbakk 26', 57', 75', Løken 43', 89', Jakobsen 61', Iversen 65', 73', 81' Nestorovic 72'	
10	5 May 1996	Rosenborg	10–0	Brann	Brattbakk 4', 15', 26', 35', 53', Own goal 20', Strand 29', Jakobsen 66' (pen.), 75', 77' –	
10	14 September 1997	Kongsvinger	4–6	Brann	Evensen 4', Gullerud 7', Karlsrud 17', Jørstad 89' Mjelde 9', 66', Pedersen 13', 87', Brendesæter 16', Hasund 40'	
10	9 September 1998	Kongsvinger	2–8	Rosenborg	Gullerud 5', Bergman 77' Strand 19', 33', Rushfeldt 41', 72', 83', 86', Skammelsrud 65', Bergdølmo 70'	
10	12 September 1999	Tromsø	8–2	Skeid	Hafstad 16', 34', Guðmundsson 45', B. Johansen 54', 64', Ru. Lange 78', S. Johansen 82', Ro. Lange 86' Sletten 55', Fjeller 73'	
10	2 August 2014	Viking	5–5	Vålerenga	Sigurðsson 44', Thioune 57', Nisja 75', 84', Sverrisson 90' Larsen 9', Kjartansson 39', 61', 68', Zahid 66'	
10	30 April 2023	Viking	7–3	HamKam	D'Agostino 48', Svendsen 50', Bjørshol 61', Salvesen 69', Pattynama 72', Tripić 78' (pen.), Tangen 85' Kirkevold 23', Norheim 74', Melgalvis 83'	

== Biggest winning margin ==
Goals margin	Date	Home team	Result	Away team	Goalscorers	Ref
10	5 May 1996	Rosenborg	10–0	Brann	Brattbakk 4', 15', 26', 35', 53', Own goal 20', Strand 29', Jakobsen 66' (pen.), 75', 77' –	
9	16 June 1968	Strømsgodset	10–1	Lyn	S. Pettersen×5, Presberg×2, Olsen×2, I. Pettersen Dybwad-Olsen	
9	28 July 1968	Lyn	11–2	Viking	Dybwad-Olsen 30', 47', 49', 62', Berg 31', 40', 75', 87', 89', Johannessen 32', Austnes 68' Own goal 39', Knudsen 72'	
9	21 September 1994	Rosenborg	9–0	Brann	Strand 5', Brattbakk 15', 34', 60', Bergersen 58', 76', Kaasa 79', 84', Støbakk 81' −	
9	25 October 1998	Sogndal	0–9	Stabæk	– Olsen 24', Belsvik 36', 47', 57', Andresen 38', 44', 49', Sigurðsson 59', Finstad 80'	
9	15 October 2000	Rosenborg	9–0	Bryne	Strand 4', 44', Skammelsrud 17', 89', Knutsen 30', Belsvik 60', 68', 86', Johnsen 76' –	
8	27 September 1964	Fredrikstad	9–1	Raufoss	Pedersen×3, Høili×2, Kristoffersen, Borgen, Own goal Unknown	
8	30 July 1978	Brann	9–1	Steinkjer	MacLeod×3, Aase×2, Tronstad×2, Huseklepp, Pedersen Unknown	
8	3 July 1988	Rosenborg	8–0	Djerv 1919	Sørloth 13', 36', 89', Brandhaug 55', Berg 69', Hansen 84', 87' –	
8	20 June 1993	Bodø/Glimt	8–0	Lyn	Bjørkan 20', R. Berg 35', 43', Johnsen 49', Staurvik 57', Brattbakk 62', Hansen 63', A. Berg 79' –	
8	2 September 1995	Rosenborg	9–1	HamKam	Brattbakk 26', 57', 75', Løken 43', 89', Jakobsen 61', Iversen 65', 73', 81' Nestorovic 72'	
8	21 April 1996	Molde	8–0	Moss	Solskjær 9', 23', 80', Sundgot 18', 55', Stavrum 35', 47', 69' –	
8	10 August 1997	Strømsgodset	8–0	Kongsvinger	Tanasić 6', Hagen 10', 44', 50', Flo 32, 87', Olsen 39', Nyan 85' –	
8	29 October 2006	Stabæk	8–0	Molde	Tchoyi 21', Keller 29', Nannskog 31, 47', 76', Gunnarson 45', 49', Hauger 79' –	
