= 1978 Norwegian Football Cup =

Norgesmesterskapet i fotball for menn 1978

Tournament details
- Country: Norway
- Teams: 128 (main competition)

Final positions
- Champions: Lillestrøm (2nd title)
- Runners-up: Brann

The 1978 Norwegian Football Cup was the 73rd edition of the Norwegian annual knockout football tournament. The Cup was won by Lillestrøm after beating Brann in the cup final with the score 2–1. This was Lillestrøm's second Norwegian Cup title.

== First round ==
Team 1	Score	Team 2
7 June 1978
Brann	5–0	Nordnes
Rosenborg	3–1	Sverresborg
Urædd	1–0	Odd
Alta	1–1 (a.e.t.)	Norild
8 June 1978
Aurskog	1–1 (a.e.t.)	Bærum
Beitstad	2–4	Strindheim
Bodø/Glimt	4–1	Stålkameratene
Brekken	3–1	Neset
Brumunddal	3–1	Lillehammer
Brønnøysund	1–4	Mosjøen
Buøy	0–2	Ulf
Bøn	0–6	Lyn
Clausenengen	1–1 (a.e.t.)	Orkanger
Djerv 1919	1–2	Haugar
Donn	2–6	Start
Drafn	3–2	Kvik (Halden)
Drammens BK	2–2 (a.e.t.)	Strømmen
Eik	3–0	Strømsgodset
Fana	0–3	Os
Flisa	0–1	Lillestrøm
Fredrikstad	5–3	Rosenhoff
Hamar	3–1	Grue
Harstad	3–1	Kabelvåg
Henning	2–6	Nessegutten
Hødd	4–0	Rollon
Jotun	3–3 (a.e.t.)	Lunner
Kongsvinger	3–2	Lørenskog
Larvik Turn	2–0	Jevnaker
Lyngen	1–0 (a.e.t.)	Fløya
Mandalskameratene	0–1	Bryne
Mjølner	4–0	Tromsdalen
Mjøndalen	1–0	Holmestrand
Molde	7–0	Dovre
Namsos	3–1	Stjørdals/Blink
Ranheim	0–0 (a.e.t.)	Falken
Raufoss	3–0	Ringsaker
Råde	0–1 (a.e.t.)	Frigg
Sander	5–1	Finstadbru
Sandnessjøen	0–6	Mo
Sandviken	1–3	Ny-Krohnborg
Sarpsborg	1–3	Sparta
Sel	0–6	HamKam
Skarbøvik	4–1	Herd
Skeid	6–0	Ørje
Ski	1–7	Moss
Skreia	2–1	Eidsvold Turn
Sogndal	4–0	Lærdal
Sola	1–0	Vigrestad
Stavanger	0–3	Vidar
Stord	2–3	Varegg
Storm	1–2	Vigør
Strinda	0–2	Steinkjer
Tjølling	1–4	Pors
Tornado	5–1	Eid
Tromsø	2–0	Grand Bodø
Tynset	3–1 (a.e.t.)	Sunndal
Tønsberg Turn	0–4	Fram (Larvik)
Viking	3–0	Brodd
Vålerengen	7–2	Tønsberg-Kameratene
Ørn	5–2	Stag
Ørsta	3–2	Bergsøy
Østsiden	1–1 (a.e.t.)	Åssiden
Aalesund	0–1	Kristiansund
Årstad	0–3	Vard
Replay: 15 June 1978
Bærum	1–1 (a.e.t.)	Aurskog
Falken	1–2 (a.e.t.)	Ranheim
Lunner	0–2	Jotun
Norild	2–1	Alta
Orkanger	1–1 (a.e.t.)	Clausenengen
Strømmen	5–1	Drammens BK
Åssiden	1–2	Østsiden
2nd replay: 22 June 1978
Aurskog	1–0	Bærum
Clausenengen	3–0	Orkanger

== Second round ==
Team 1	Score	Team 2
29 June 1978
Aurskog	0–3	Skeid
Bodø/Glimt	2–0	Norild
Brekken	1–2	Molde
Brumunddal	4–3	Mjøndalen
Bryne	4–1	Sola
Eik	0–2	Lyn
Fram (Larvik)	2–2 (a.e.t.)	Larvik Turn
Frigg	1–0	Drafn
HamKam	6–0	Sander
Harstad	4–0	Lyngen
Haugar	0–4	Viking
Jotun	0–2	Sogndal
Lillestrøm	5–0	Hamar
Mo	3–0	Mosjøen
Moss	5–1	Skreia
Nessegutten	2–1	Ranheim
Ny-Krohnborg	1–0	Os
Pors	5–2	Fredrikstad
Skarbøvik	0–1	Hødd
Sparta	1–3	Vålerengen
Start	3–1	Vidar
Steinkjer	3–2	Namsos
Strindheim	0–2	Clausenengen
Strømmen	3–2 (a.e.t.)	Ørn
Tromsø	3–1	Mjølner
Tynset	1–2 (a.e.t.)	Raufoss
Ulf	3–1	Vard
Varegg	1–3	Brann
Vigør	0–1 (a.e.t.)	Urædd
Ørsta	1–1 (a.e.t.)	Tornado
Østsiden	2–0	Kongsvinger
2 July 1978
Kristiansund	0–3	Rosenborg
Replay: Unknown date
Larvik Turn	0–1	Fram (Larvik)
Tornado	1–0 (a.e.t.)	Ørsta

== Third round ==
Team 1	Score	Team 2
25 July 1978
HamKam	1–3 (a.e.t.)	Moss
26 July 1978
Molde	1–0	Tornado
Lillestrøm	6–0	Østsiden
Urædd	1–5	Start
Brann	9–1	Ny-Krohnborg
Vålerengen	5–2	Pors
Bryne	2–1	Ulf
Clausenengen	0–0 (a.e.t.)	Steinkjer
27 July 1978
Fram (Larvik)	2–3	Viking
29 July 1978
Tromsø	3–2	Harstad
30 July 1978
Rosenborg	5–0	Brumunddal
Hødd	0–2	Nessegutten
Raufoss	1–0	Skeid
Sogndal	1–2	Frigg
2 August 1978
Mo	1–0	Bodø/Glimt
3 August 1978
Lyn	1–0	Strømmen
Replay: 2 August 1978
Steinkjer	2–3	Clausenengen

== Fourth round ==
Team 1	Score	Team 2
23 August 1978
Frigg	0–1	Bryne
Start	5–1	Raufoss
Rosenborg	2–0	Molde
Nessegutten	0–2 (a.e.t.)	Brann
Mo	0–3	Lillestrøm
24 August 1978
Moss	3–2	Lyn
Viking	4–0	Tromsø
Clausenengen	2–1 (a.e.t.)	Vålerengen

== Quarter-finals ==
6 September 1978

Brann	1–0	Bryne
Dalhaug 81'

Brann Stadion, Bergen
Attendance: 11,255
Referee: Ivar Fredriksen

6 September 1978

Lillestrøm	1–0	Moss
Tomteberget 17'

Åråsen Stadion, Lillestrøm
Attendance: 4,081
Referee: Jan Erik Olsen

6 September 1978

Rosenborg	1–1 (a.e.t.)	Start
Didrichsen 72'		Mathisen 31'

Lerkendal Stadion, Trondheim
Attendance: 12,800
Referee: Reinar Bjørnstad

6 September 1978

Viking	5–0	Clausenengen
Johannessen 30', 47', 75'; Svendsen 54', 88'

Stavanger Stadion, Stavanger
Attendance: 5,553
Referee: Thorbjørn Aass

=== Replay ===
15 September 1978

Start	2–1	Rosenborg
Mathisen 47' (pen.); Skuseth 61'		Børset 90'

Kristiansand Stadion, Kristiansand
Attendance: 4,149
Referee: Einar Halle

== Semi-finals ==
4 October 1978

Brann	2–1 (a.e.t.)	Viking
Aase 8', 93'		Kvia 55'

Brann Stadion, Bergen
Attendance: 17,390
Referee: Rolf Haugen

4 October 1978

Start	0–0 (a.e.t.)	Lillestrøm

Kristiansand Stadion, Kristiansand
Attendance: 8,308
Referee: Svein-Inge Thime

=== Replay ===
11 October 1978

Lillestrøm	1–0	Start
Lund 2' (pen.)

Åråsen Stadion, Lillestrøm
Attendance: 8,243
Referee: Kaare Lindboe

== Final ==
22 October 1978
13:15 CET (UTC+1)

Lillestrøm	2–1	Brann
V. Hansen 74', 76'	Report	Aase 20'

Ullevaal Stadion, Oslo
Attendance: 23,534
Referee: Reidar Bjørnestad (Sandviken)

Lillestrøm's winning squad: Arne Amundsen, Per Berg (Arne Dokken 45), Jan Birkelund, Tore Kordahl, Georg Hammer, Frank Grønlund, Gunnar Lønstad, Øivind Tomteberget, Leif Hansen, Tom Lund, Vidar Hansen and Rolf Nordberg.

Brann's team: Jan Knudsen, Helge Karlsen, Bjørn Brandt, Terje Rolland, Tore Nordtvedt, Kjell Rune Pedersen (Ingvar Dalhaug 81), Atle Hellesø, Neil MacLeod, Ingvald Huseklepp, Steinar Aase and Bjørn Tronstad.
