= 1979 Norwegian Football Cup final =

- Event: 1979 Norwegian Football Cup
Viking	Haugar
2	1
- Date: 21 October 1979
- Venue: Ullevaal Stadion, Oslo
- Referee: Ivar Fredriksen
- Attendance: 25,000

The 1979 Norwegian Football Cup final was the final match of the 1979 Norwegian Football Cup, the 74th season of the Norwegian Football Cup, the premier Norwegian football cup competition organized by the Football Association of Norway (NFF). The match was played on 21 October 1979 at the Ullevaal Stadion in Oslo, and opposed two First Division sides and the clubs from Rogaland, Viking and Haugar. Viking defeated Haugar 2–1 to claim the Norwegian Cup for a third time in their history.

== Route to the final ==
Viking		Round	Haugar		
Mosterøy	5–0 (H)	Round 1	Sandviken	3–0 aet (A)	
Sola	4–0 (A)	Round 2	Stord	5–2 (H)	
Klepp	1–0 aet (A)	Round 3	Os	1–1 aet (A)	1–0 (H)
Raufoss	3–0 aet (H)	Round 4	Start	2–0 (H)	
Rosenborg	1–0 (A)	Quarterfinal	Bryne	5–0 (A)	
Brann	1–0 (H)	Semifinal	Mjøndalen	3–1 (A)	

== Match ==
=== Details ===
21 October 1979
13:15 CET (UTC+1)

Viking	2–1	Haugar
Berntsen 55' (pen.); Vikanes 62' (o.g.)	Report	Mooney 25'

Ullevaal Stadion, Oslo
Attendance: 25,000
Referee: Ivar Fredriksen (Lillestrøm)

Viking:
GK	(Norway) Erik Johannessen
DF	(Norway) Bjarne Berntsen
DF	(Norway) Svein Fjælberg
DF	(Norway) Per Henriksen
MF	(Norway) Tor Reidar Brekke
MF	(Norway) Tonning Hammer
MF	(Norway) Inge Valen
MF	(Norway) Svein Kvia
FW	(Norway) Finn Krogh
FW	(Norway) Trygve Johannessen
FW	(Norway) Isak Arne Refvik	(substituted off) 87'
Substitutions
MF	(Norway) Trond Ekholdt	(substituted in) 87'
MF	(Norway) Torbjørn Svendsen
FW	(Norway) Magnus Flatestøl
Coach:
(England) Tony Knapp

Haugar:
GK	(Northern Ireland) Steve Hobson
DF	(Norway) Rune Larsen	(substituted off) 73'
DF	(Norway) Leif Birkeland
DF	(Norway) Jens Egil Vikanes
DF	(England) Dennis Burnett
MF	(Norway) Terje Solberg
MF	(Norway) Harald Undahl
MF	(Norway) Eivind Hovland	(substituted off) 90'
MF	(Norway) Tor Nilsen
MF	(Norway) Dag Christophersen
FW	(England) Dean Mooney
Substitutions
	?	(substituted in) 73'
DF	(Norway) Åge Sørensen	(substituted in) 90'
Coach:
(England) Dennis Burnett
