= 1976 Norwegian Football Cup =

Norgesmesterskapet i fotball for menn 1976

Tournament details
- Country: Norway
- Teams: 128 (main competition)

Final positions
- Champions: Brann (4th title)
- Runners-up: Sogndal

The 1976 Norwegian Football Cup was the 71st edition of the Norwegian annual knockout football tournament. The Cup was won by Brann after beating Sogndal in the cup final with the score 2–1. This was Brann's fourth Norwegian Cup title.

Sogndal played in the third division at this time.

== First round ==
Team 1	Score	Team 2
2 June 1976
Brann	3–0	Stord
Orkanger	0–1	Rosenborg
Teie	0–2	Odd
3 June 1976
Alta	1–1 (a.e.t.)	Honningsvåg
Alvdal	0–5	Røros
Aurskog	1–0	Østsiden
Baune	0–1	Fana
Beitstad	0–3	Steinkjer
Bodø/Glimt	4–0	Furuflaten
Bryne	3–1 (a.e.t.)	Vidar
Clausenengen	3–2	Træff
Drafn	2–1 (a.e.t.)	Ørn
Eik	0–4	Skiold
Flisa	0–5	Brumunddal
Florvåg	3–0	Erdal
Fredrikstad	5–0	Abildsø
Gjøvik-Lyn	3–0	Eidsvold Turn
Grorud	0–3	Frigg
Hamar	5–1	Vardal
Henning	2–1	Neset
Hødd	2–0	Ørsta
Jerv	3–1	Kvinesdal
Jevnaker	0–1	Redalen
Kirkenes	2–1	Norild
Kongsvinger	2–0	Skreia
Kopervik	1–2	Djerv 1919
Kragerø	1–5	Pors
Kvik (Trondheim)	0–2	Falken
Landsås	1–0	Harstad
Larvik Turn	1–0 (a.e.t.)	Tjølling
Lillehammer	1–1 (a.e.t.)	HamKam
Lillestrøm	1–0	Kråkerøy
Lisleby	0–2	Moss
Madla	0–2	Viking
Mandalskameratene	0–4	Start
Mjølner	6–1	Mo IF
Mjøndalen	3–0	Ski
Mo IL	3–0	Grand Bodø
Molde	4–0	Varfjell
Nessegutten	3–0	Stjørdals/Blink
Nybergsund	3–1	Grue
Raufoss	0–1 (a.e.t.)	Manglerud/Star
Sandviken	0–4	Os
Sarpsborg	1–0 (a.e.t.)	Navestad
Selbak	2–3	Stabæk
Selfors	0–3	Stålkameratene
Skarbøvik	2–2 (a.e.t.)	Aalesund
Skeid	4–1	Rakkestad
Slemmestad	0–1	Lyn
Snøgg	0–2	Fram (Larvik)
Sogndal	3–0	Jotun
Sprint/Jeløy	0–3	Åssiden
Spydeberg	0–3	Strømsgodset
Stavanger	4–1	Vigrestad
Strindheim	1–1 (a.e.t.)	Ranheim
Strømmen	3–2	Askim
Sunndal	3–0	Bryn
Tornado	2–3	Bergsøy
Ulf	4–1 (a.e.t.)	Brodd
Urædd	2–3	Herkules
Vard	1–0	Haugar
Varegg	2–0 (a.e.t.)	Ny-Krohnborg
Vålerengen	2–1	Birkebeineren
Åndalsnes	2–3	Folldal
Replay: Unknown date
HamKam	2–1	Lillehammer
Honningsvåg	1–0	Alta
Ranheim	0–1	Strindheim
Aalesund	2–1	Skarbøvik

== Second round ==
Team 1	Score	Team 2
29 June 1976
Skiold	1–2	Odd
30 June 1976
Florvåg	0–6	Brann
Røros	4–0	Rosenborg
1 July 1976
Bergsøy	2–0	Hødd
Bodø/Glimt	4–1	Stålkameratene
Clausenengen	1–2	Molde
Djerv 1919	2–1	Bryne
Falken	0–4	Nessegutten
Fana	1–0	Varegg
Folldal	2–1	Brumunddal
Fram (Larvik)	3–1	Stabæk
Frigg	1–4	Aurskog
HamKam	7–0	Redalen
Herkules	0–4	Mjøndalen
Kirkenes	4–1	Honningsvåg
Landsås	1–2	Mjølner
Lillestrøm	1–0	Nybergsund
Lyn	1–3	Kongsvinger
Manglerud/Star	2–4	Fredrikstad
Mo IL	0–1	Henning
Moss	8–1	Hamar
Os	0–1	Sogndal
Pors	3–2	Skeid
Sarpsborg	1–1 (a.e.t.)	Drafn
Start	2–0	Jerv
Stavanger	0–1	Vard
Steinkjer	3–1	Strindheim
Strømmen	0–1	Vålerengen
Strømsgodset	1–0	Gjøvik-Lyn
Viking	4–0	Ulf
Aalesund	2–0	Sunndal
Åssiden	3–1	Larvik Turn
Replay: Unknown date
Drafn	2–3	Sarpsborg

== Third round ==
Team 1	Score	Team 2
25 July 1976
Mjølner	3–1	Kirkenes
Henning	0–6	Steinkjer
Nessegutten	0–2	Bodø/Glimt
Folldal	3–3 (a.e.t.)	Aalesund
28 July 1976
Vard	5–1	Djerv 1919
Mjøndalen	0–0 (a.e.t.)	Pors
Kongsvinger	0–10	Moss
Vålerengen	8–0	Røros
Fredrikstad	5–0	Åssiden
29 July 1976
Molde	2–1	Bergsøy
Brann	4–1	Fana
Sogndal	2–1	Viking
Start	3–0	Fram (Larvik)
Odd	2–0	Strømsgodset
Aurskog	1–3	HamKam
Sarpsborg	1–0	Lillestrøm
Replay: 29 July 1976
Aalesund	1–0	Folldal
Replay: 4 August 1976
Pors	0–1	Mjøndalen

== Fourth round ==
Team 1	Score	Team 2
15 August 1976
Vålerengen	2–0	Mjøndalen
HamKam	0–1	Sogndal
Odd	2–1	Fredrikstad
Vard	5–0	Sarpsborg
Moss	0–4 (a.e.t.)	Start
Aalesund	2–4	Brann
18 August 1976
Bodø/Glimt	5–2 (a.e.t.)	Molde
Steinkjer	3–0	Mjølner

== Quarter-finals ==
5 September 1976

Brann	1–0	Bodø/Glimt
Tronstad 59'

Brann Stadion, Bergen
Attendance: 23,847
Referee: Rolf Haugen

5 September 1976

Odd	2–1 (a.e.t.)	Vard
Marcussen 52'; Tørdal 111'		Økland 15'

Odd Stadion, Skien
Attendance: 9,500
Referee: Ivar Fredriksen

5 September 1976

Vålerengen	3–3 (a.e.t.)	Steinkjer
Olavsen 8'; Andersen 29'; Iversen 42'		Fiske 4', 38'; Singsaas 56'

Bislett Stadion, Oslo
Attendance: 9,156
Referee: Bjørn Johansen

5 September 1976

Sogndal	1–0	Start
Bakke 18'

Fosshaugane, Sogndalsfjøra
Attendance: 5,628
Referee: Reidar Bjørnerstad

=== Replay ===
29 September 1976

Steinkjer	3–2 (a.e.t.)	Vålerengen
Fiske 40'; Jenshus 76', 78'		Olavsen 20'; Bjørke 78'

Guldbergaunet Stadion, Steinkjer
Attendance: 7,200
Referee: Einar Halle

== Semi-finals ==
6 October 1976

Brann	3–0	Odd
Hellesø 30', 85'; Larsen 82'

Brann Stadion, Bergen
Attendance: 18,013
Referee: Kjell Wahlen

6 October 1976

Steinkjer	1–3	Sogndal
Vådahl 31'		Bakke 12', 54', 80'

Guldbergaunet Stadion, Steinkjer
Attendance: c. 9,000
Referee: Kaare Lindboe

== Final ==
24 October 1976
13:15 CET (UTC+1)

Brann	2–1	Sogndal
Aase 66'; Tronstad 86'	Report	Christiansen 80'

Ullevaal Stadion, Oslo
Attendance: 22,834
Referee: Odd Johannessen (Vang)

Brann's winning squad: Jan Knudsen, Tore Nordtvedt, Helge Karlsen, Atle Bilsback, Per Egil Pedersen, Ingvald Huseklepp (Rune Pedersen 84), Atle Hellesø (Frode Larsen 46), Neil MacLeod, Egil Austbø, Steinar Aase and Bjørn Tronstad.

Sogndal's squad: Leon Hovland, Willy Ljøsne (Jarle Skartun 88), Jon Navarsete, Torodd Helle, Gunnar S. Haare, Magdalon Sæthre, Ingvar Stadheim, Johan Johannesen, Svein Bakke, Knut Christiansen and Rolf Navarsete (Terje Nysæther 89).
