= 1982 Norwegian Football Cup final =

- Event: 1982 Norwegian Football Cup
Brann	Molde
3	2
- Date: 24 October 1982
- Venue: Ullevaal Stadion, Oslo
- Referee: Torbjørn Aass
- Attendance: 24,000

The 1982 Norwegian Football Cup final was the 77th final of the Norwegian Football Cup. The final took place at Ullevaal Stadion in Oslo on 24 October 1982. SK Brann were in their 9th final (4 wins and 4 runners-up), while Molde were in their first ever final and therefore had the chance to win the first major trophy in the club's history.

The final between the two teams ended with a 3–2 victory for Brann. The goal scorers for the winning team were Geir Austvik after 17 minutes, Ingvar Dalhaug after 42 minutes and Neil MacLeod after 58 minutes. For Molde, Rune Ulvestad scored in the 21st minute, and Steinar Henden scored in the 37th minute. Øyvind Pettersen was sent off for Brann in the 88th minute. 24,000 spectators watched the match at Ullevaal Stadion in Oslo. The referee was Torbjørn Aass.

== Route to the final ==
Brann		Round	Molde	
Voss (D4); A 3–0	Møller 32', MacLeod 35', Pettersen 73'	First round	Åndalsnes (D3); H 3–0	Berg 29', Aase 74', Sorthe 85'
Fana (D3); H 7–1	MacLeod 6', Møller 24', Dalhaug 25', 32', Pedersen 72', 86', Kleppa 84'	Second round	Tornado (D3); A 1–0	Ulvestad 20'
Haugar (D2); A 1–0	Johansen 85'	Third round	Sunndal (D2); H 1–0	Ulvestad 88'
Bodø/Glimt (D2); A 4–1	Dalhaug 28', Austvik 34', Krogh 83', Pedersen 87'	Fourth Round	Sogndal (D1); A 5–2 (a.e.t.)	Tennfjord 15', Henden 37', 105', 117, Ulvestad 99'
Mjøndalen (D1); H 4–2	Møller 50', MacLeod 54', Dalhaug 85', Pettersen 89'	Quarter-finals	Fredrikstad (D1); H 2–1 (a.e.t.)	Ulvestad 47', Hestad 112'
Moss (D1); H 3–1 (a.e.t.)	Pedersen 71', 97', Pettersen 101'	Semi-finals	Viking (D1); A 1–0	Berg 52'

- (D1) = 1. divisjon team
- (D2) = 2. divisjon team
- (D3) = 3. divisjon team
- (D3) = 4. divisjon team

== Match ==
=== Details ===
24 October 1982
13:15 CEST (UTC+2)

Brann	3–2	Molde
Austvik 18'; Dalhaug 43'; MacLeod 60'	Report	Ulvestad 22'; Henden 36'

Ullevaal Stadion, Oslo
Attendance: 24,000
Referee: Torbjørn Aass (Brage)

Brann	Molde

Brann:
GK	1	(Norway) Stein Nordstad
RB		(Norway) Hans Brandtun
CB		(Norway) Bjørn Brandt
CB		(Norway) Tor Strand
LB		(Norway) Asgeir Kleppa
CM		(Norway) Kjell Rune Pedersen	(substituted off) 83'
CM		(Norway) Arne Møller
CM	9	(England) Neil MacLeod (c)
RW		(Norway) Ingvar Dalhaug	(substituted off) 64'
CF		(Norway) Finn Einar Krogh
LW	11	(Norway) Geir Austvik
Substitutions:
MF		(Norway) Terje Rolland	(substituted in) 83'
MF		(Norway) Øyvind Pettersen	(substituted in) 64'
Head Coach:
(Norway) Arve Mokkelbost

Molde:
GK	1	(Norway) Inge Bratteteig
RB		(Norway) Tor Gunnar Hagbø
CB		(Norway) Bertil Stranden
CB		(Norway) Ulrich Møller (c)
LB		(Norway) Per Arne Aase	(substituted off) 87'
CM		(Norway) Geir Malmedal
CM	7	(Norway) Rune Ulvestad
CM		(Norway) Ivar Helge Mittet	(substituted off) 74'
RW	9	(Norway) Stein Olav Hestad
CF		(Norway) Jan Berg
LW		(Norway) Steinar Henden
Substitutions:
LB		(Norway) Stig Monsen	(substituted in) 87'
MF		(Norway) Einar Sekkeseter	(substituted in) 74'
Head Coach:
(Norway) Jan Fuglset

== See also ==
- 1982 Norwegian Football Cup
- 1982 1. divisjon
- 1982 2. divisjon
- 1982 in Norwegian football
