= 1977–78 European Cup Winners' Cup =

Final positions
- Champions: (Belgium) Anderlecht (2nd title)
- Runners-up: Austria Wien

The 1977–78 European Cup Winners' Cup was won by Anderlecht in the final against Austria Wien. It was Anderlecht's third consecutive final, the best record in the competition, of which they won two.

== Qualifying match ==
Team 1	Agg.	Team 2	1st leg	2nd leg
Rangers (Scotland)	3–2	(Switzerland) Young Boys	1–0	2–2

=== First leg ===
17 August 1977

Rangers (Scotland)	1–0	(Switzerland) Young Boys
Greig	Summary

Ibrox Park, Glasgow
Attendance: 30,000

=== Second leg ===
31 August 1977

Young Boys (Switzerland)	2–2	(Scotland) Rangers
Johnstone (o.g.); Leuzinger	Summary	Johnstone; Smith

Wankdorf Stadium, Bern
Attendance: 21,000

Rangers won 3–2 on aggregate and qualified for the competition.

== First round ==
Team 1	Agg.	Team 2	1st leg	2nd leg
Progrès Niedercorn (Luxembourg)	0–10	(Denmark) VB	0–1	0–9
PAOK (Greece)	4–0	(Poland) Zagłębie Sosnowiec	2–0	2–0
Rangers (Scotland)	0–3	(Netherlands) Twente	0–0	0–3
Brann (Norway)	5–0	(Iceland) ÍA Akranes	1–0	4–0
Köln (West Germany)	2–3	(Portugal) Porto	2–2	0–1
Saint-Étienne (France)	1–3	(England) Manchester United	1–1	0–2
Hamburg (West Germany)	13–3	(Finland) Lahden Reipas	8–1	5–2
Lokomotiv Sofia (Bulgaria)	1–8	(Belgium) Anderlecht	1–6	0–2
Coleraine (Northern Ireland)	3–6	(East Germany) Lokomotive Leipzig	1–4	2–2
Real Betis (Spain)	3–2	(Italy) Milan	2–0	1–2
Valletta (Malta)	0–7	(Soviet Union) Dynamo Moscow	0–2	0–5
Olympiakos Nicosia (Cyprus)	1–8	(Romania) Universitatea Craiova	1–6	0–2
Cardiff City (Wales)	0–1	Austria Wien	0–0	0–1
Lokomotiva Košice (Czechoslovakia)	2–2 (a)	(Sweden) Öster	0–0	2–2
Beşiktaş (Turkey)	2–5	(Hungary) Diósgyőri VTK Miskolc	2–0	0–5
Dundalk (Republic of Ireland)	1–4	(Socialist Federal Republic of Yugoslavia) Hajduk Split	1–0	0–4

=== First leg ===
14 September 1977

Progrès Niedercorn (Luxembourg)	0–1	(Denmark) VB
	Report	Thychosen 70'

Stade Jos Haupert, Niederkorn
Attendance: 1,100
Referee: Jan Peeters (Belgium)

14 September 1977

Saint-Étienne (France)	1–1	(England) Manchester United
Synaeghel 80'		Hill 78'

Saint-Étienne
Attendance: 33,678

14 September 1977

Real Betis (Spain)	2–0	(Italy) Milan
García Soriano 13'; Eulate 73'

Estadio Benito Villamarín, Seville
Attendance: 37,000
Referee: Michel Kitabdjian (France)

13 September 1977

Lokomotiv Sofia (Bulgaria)	1–6	(Belgium) Anderlecht
Kolev 57'		Van der Elst 2', 6', 11' (pen.), 60'; Nielsen 32'; Van Poucke 89'

Vasil Levski, Sofia
Referee: Gonella (Italy)

14 September 1977

Beşiktaş (Turkey)	2–0	(Hungary) Diósgyőri VTK
Zekeriya Alp 2'; Paunović 83'

İnönü, Istanbul
Referee: Josef Bucek (Austria)

14 September 1977

Rangers (Scotland)	0–0	(Netherlands) Twente

Ibrox Park, Glasgow
Referee: Wolfgang Riedel (East Germany)

14 September 1977

Köln (West Germany)	2–2	(Portugal) Porto
Löhr 5'; D. Müller 65'		Gabriel 60'; Octavio 69'

Müngersdorfer Stadion, Cologne
Attendance: 21,000
Referee: Clive Thomas (Wales)

14 September 1977

Hamburg (West Germany)	8–1	(Finland) Lahden Reipas
Keller 6', 34', 38', 73'; Volkert 19' (pen.); Buljan 60'; Steffenhagen 77'; Reimann 83'		Sandberg 88'

Volksparkstadion, Hamburg
Referee: Alozjiy Jargusz (Poland)

14 September 1977

Dundalk (Republic of Ireland)	1–0	(Socialist Federal Republic of Yugoslavia) Hajduk Split
Flanagan 86'

Oriel Park, Dundalk
Referee: Jan Keizer (Netherlands)

14 September 1977

Coleraine (Northern Ireland)	1–4	(East Germany) Lokomotive Leipzig
Tweed 52'		Eichhorn 2'; Kühn 38'; Löwe 44', 69'

The Showgrounds, Coleraine
Referee: Magnus Petursson (Iceland)

14 September 1977

PAOK (Greece)	2–0	(Poland) Zagłębie Sosnowiec
Pellios 25'; Anastasiadis 80'

Toumba Stadium, Thessaloniki
Referee: Alberto Michelotti (Italy)

14 September 1977

Brann (Norway)	1–0	(Iceland) ÍA Akranes
Aase 37'	Report

Brann Stadion, Bergen
Attendance: 7,050

15 September 1977

Olympiakos Nicosia (Cyprus)	1–6	(Romania) Universitatea Craiova
Aristidou 84' (pen.)	Report	Balaci 12', 54'; Cârțu 51'; Marcu 61'; Crișan 81'; Irimescu 86'

GSP Stadium, Nicosia
Attendance: 4,000
Referee: Dimitar Parmakov (Bulgaria)

=== Second leg ===
28 September 1977

VB (Denmark)	9–0	(Luxembourg) Progrès Niedercorn
Sørensen 15'; Østergaard 19', 85'; Eg 20'; Nørregaard 50', 59', 64'; Jacquet 77'; Thychosen 80'	Report

Vejle Stadium, Vejle
Attendance: 8,400
Referee: Svein Thime (Norway)

VB won 10–0 on aggregate

5 October 1977

Manchester United (England)	2–0	(France) Saint-Étienne
Pearson 32'; Coppell 65'

Home Park, Plymouth^{1}
Attendance: 31,634

Manchester United won 3–1 on aggregate.

28 September 1977

Milan (Italy)	2–1	(Spain) Real Betis
Tosetto 34'; Capello 59'		López 63'

San Siro, Milan
Attendance: 60,000
Referee: Orhan Cebe (Turkey)

Real Betis won 3–2 on aggregate.

28 September 1977

Porto (Portugal)	1–0	(West Germany) Köln
Murca

Cidade de Coimbra, Porto
Attendance: 30,000
Referee: Patrick Partridge (England)

Porto won 3–2 on aggregate.

28 September 1977

Universitatea Craiova (Romania)	2–0	(Cyprus) Olympiakos Nicosia
Marcu 15'; Cârțu 83'	Report

Stadionul Central, Craiova
Attendance: 12,000
Referee: Vojtech Christov (Czechoslovakia)

Universitatea Craiova won 8–1 on aggregate.

28 September 1977

ÍA Akranes (Iceland)	0–4	(Norway) Brann
	Report	Aase 36', 76'; Dalhaug 82'; Tronstad 89'

Akranesvöllur, Akranes
Attendance: 1,800

Brann won 5–0 on aggregate.

Notes

- Manchester United were banned from playing within 200 kilometres (120 mi) of Old Trafford, following crowd trouble in the first leg.

== Second round ==
Team 1	Agg.	Team 2	1st leg	2nd leg
VB (Denmark)	4–2	(Greece) PAOK	3–0	1–2
Twente (Netherlands)	4–1	(Norway) Brann	2–0	2–1
Porto (Portugal)	6–5	(England) Manchester United	4–0	2–5
Hamburg (West Germany)	2–3	(Belgium) Anderlecht	1–2	1–1
Lokomotive Leipzig (East Germany)	2–3	(Spain) Real Betis	1–1	1–2
Dynamo Moscow (Soviet Union)	2–2 (3-0p)	(Romania) Universitatea Craiova	2–0	0–2 (aet)
Austria Wien	1–1 (a)	(Czechoslovakia) Lokomotíva Košice	0–0	1–1
Diósgyőri VTK Miskolc (Hungary)	3–3 (3-4p)	(Socialist Federal Republic of Yugoslavia) Hajduk Split	2–1	1–2 (aet)

=== First leg ===
19 October 1977

Porto (Portugal)	4–0	(England) Manchester United
Duda 8', 24', 54'; Oliveira 60'

Estádio das Antas, Porto
Attendance: 70,000
Referee: Ernst Dörflinger Switzerland

19 October 1977

Dynamo Moscow (Soviet Union)	2–0	(Romania) Universitatea Craiova
Kazachyonok 23'; Minayev 39'	Report

Central Dynamo Stadium, Moscow
Attendance: 5,000
Referee: Timoleon Latsios (Greece)

19 October 1977

Twente (Netherlands)	2–0	(Norway) Brann
Gritter 42', 57'	Report

Diekman Stadion, Enschede
Attendance: 13,000

=== Second leg ===
2 November 1977

Manchester United (England)	5–2	(Portugal) Porto
Coppell 8', 65'; Murça 39', 90' (o.g.); Nicholl 44'		Seninho 29', 85'

Old Trafford, Manchester
Attendance: 51,831
Referee: Heinz Einbeck (East Germany)

Porto won 6–5 on aggregate.

2 November 1977

Universitatea Craiova (Romania)	2–0 (a.e.t.)	(Soviet Union) Dynamo Moscow
Cârțu 18'; Beldeanu 27'	Report
Penalties
Beldeanu (penalty missed); Ștefănescu (penalty missed); Negrilă (penalty missed)	0–3	(penalty scored) Kazachyonok; (penalty scored) Maksimenkov; (penalty scored) Petrushin

Stadionul Central, Craiova
Attendance: 25,000
Referee: Marijan Rauš (Yugoslavia)

2–2 on aggregate; Dynamo Moscow won on penalties.

2 November 1977

Brann (Norway)	1–2	(Netherlands) Twente
Tronstad 18'	Report	Gritter 55'; Thoresen 86'

Brann Stadion, Bergen
Attendance: 12,000

Twente won 4–1 on aggregate.

== Quarter-finals ==
Team 1	Agg.	Team 2	1st leg	2nd leg
VB (Denmark)	0–7	(Netherlands) Twente	0–3	0–4
Porto (Portugal)	1–3	(Belgium) Anderlecht	1–0	0–3
Real Betis (Spain)	0–3	(Soviet Union) Dynamo Moscow	0–0	0–3
Austria Wien	2–2 (3-0p)	(Socialist Federal Republic of Yugoslavia) Hajduk Split	1–1	1–1 (aet)

=== First leg ===
1 March 1978

(Portugal) Porto	1–0	Anderlecht (Belgium)
Gomes 36'

Estádio das Antas, Porto
Attendance: 45,000
Referee: John Carpenter (Republic of Ireland)

=== Second leg ===
15 March 1978

Anderlecht (Belgium)	3–0	(Portugal) Porto
Rensenbrink 28' (pen.); Nielsen 31'; Vercauteren 81'

Stade Émile Versé, Brussels
Attendance: 28,228
Referee: Walter Hungerbühler (Switzerland)

Anderlecht won 3–1 on aggregate.

== Semi-finals ==
Team 1	Agg.	Team 2	1st leg	2nd leg
Twente (Netherlands)	0–3	(Belgium) Anderlecht	0–1	0–2
Dynamo Moscow (Soviet Union)	4–5 (p)	Austria Wien	2–1	1–2 (aet)

== Final ==
3 May 1978

Anderlecht (Belgium)	4–0	Austria Wien
Rensenbrink 13', 44'; Van Binst 45', 82'	Report Report 2

Parc des Princes, Paris
Attendance: 48,679
Referee: Heinz Aldinger (West Germany)

== See also ==
- 1977–78 European Cup
- 1977–78 UEFA Cup
