= Stadheim =

Stadheim is a Norwegian surname. Notable people with the surname include:

- Anders Stadheim (born 1980), Norwegian footballer
- Ingvar Stadheim (born 1951), Norwegian footballer and manager
