= Jarle Skartun =

Norwegian politician

Jarle Skartun (born 14 June 1956) is a Norwegian footballer and politician for the Centre Party.

As a footballer, Skartun played for Sogndal IL, reaching the Norwegian cup final in 1976 and the highest Norwegian league in the 1980s. Belonging to the same player generation as Svein Bakke, Skartun also played with the next generation including Frode Grodås and Atle Torvanger. He married Kari Marie Navarsete, a sister of Sogndal IL leader Rolf Navarsete.

Skartun was a member of the municipal council for Sogndal Municipality and the Sogn og Fjordane county council, including nine years as mayor of Sogndal Municipality from 1994 to 2003. He was elected as a deputy representative to the Parliament of Norway from Sogn og Fjordane for the terms 1993–1997 and 1997–2001. He met during five days of parliamentary session. He was also a member of the Centre Party central board.

Skartun also became known in his region as chairman of the board in Fjord1. In 2012 he was hired as the chief administrative officer of Luster Municipality.
