= 1979 Norwegian Football Cup =

Norgesmesterskapet i fotball for menn 1979

Tournament details
- Country: Norway
- Teams: 128 (main competition)

Final positions
- Champions: Viking (3rd title)
- Runners-up: Haugar

The 1979 Norwegian Football Cup was the 74th edition of the Norwegian annual knockout football tournament. The Cup was won by Viking after beating Haugar in the cup final with the score 2–1. This was Viking's third Norwegian Cup title.

== First round ==
Team 1	Score	Team 2
28 May 1979
Rosenborg	5–0	Kvik (Trondheim)
Brevik	1–4	Mjøndalen
30 May 1979
Arna	1–2	Brann
Asker	0–2	Kongsvinger
Bergsøy	3–3	Rollon
Bærum	1–3 (a.e.t.)	Brumunddal
Drafn	0–2	Storm
Egersund	0–3	Bryne
Eidsvold Turn	1–0 (a.e.t.)	Åssiden
Finstadbru	2–4 (a.e.t.)	Sarpsborg
Fram (Larvik)	5–0	Herkules
Faaberg	3–4 (a.e.t.)	Raufoss
Gjøvik-Lyn	0–3	Vålerengen
HamKam	5–1	Hamar
Jerv	2–1	Vigør
Jevnaker	0–1	Lillehammer
Jotun	1–0	Sogndal
Kabelvåg	1–1 (a.e.t.)	Mjølner
Kjelsås	2–3	Eik
Klepp	1–0	Donn
Kristiansund	3–0	Clausenengen
Landsås	1–2	Bodø/Glimt
Lillestrøm	4–0	Grorud
Lyngen	4–1	Kautokeino
Lærdal	2–3	Dale Fjaler
Lørenskog	0–4	Skeid
Magnor	1–4	Moss
Mo	2–1	Saltdalkameratene
Molde	1–0	Træff
Mosjøen	4–1	Stålkameratene
Neset	3–0	Sverre
Nessegutten	3–0	Namsos
Oppsal	1–3	Ørn
Os	1–0	Hald
Pors	3–1	Stag
Røros	1–0 (a.e.t.)	Folldal
Sandviken	0–3 (a.e.t.)	Haugar
Skiold	1–2	Strømsgodset
Sola	1–1 (a.e.t.)	Stavanger
Sprint/Jeløy	1–4	Larvik Turn
Start	1–0	Vindbjart
Steinberg	1–0	Aurskog
Stjørdals/Blink	3–1	Freidig
Stord	1–0	Baune
Strindheim	3–1	Flå
Strømmen	1–2	Kvik (Halden)
Sunndal	1–0	Falken
Teie	1–5	Frigg
Tistedalen	0–4	Fredrikstad
Tornado	2–1	Eid
Tromsø	7–0	Sørild
Tryggkam	1–3 (a.e.t.)	Steinkjer
Tynset	2–1	Brekken
Vang	0–1	Ull/Kisa
Vard	0–1	Djerv 1919
Varegg	3–0	Ny-Krohnborg
Vidar	1–0	Ulf
Vigrestad	0–2	Brodd
Viking	5–0	Mosterøy
Ørje	0–1	Sander
Ørsta	3–1	Hødd
Aalesund	0–1	Skarbøvik
31 May 1979
Snøgg	2–2 (a.e.t.)	Odd
1 June 1979
Lyn	2–1	Grue
Replay: 6 June 1979
Mjølner	6–2	Kabelvåg
Odd	2–1	Snøgg
Rollon	1–2 (a.e.t.)	Bergsøy
Stavanger	0–2	Sola

== Second round ==
Team 1	Score	Team 2
29 June 1979
Brann	6–1	Jotun
4 July 1979
Rosenborg	4–1	Tynset
Sarpsborg	0–2	Lyn
5 July 1979
Bergsøy	3–1	Ørsta
Brodd	0–4	Klepp
Brumunddal	3–4 (a.e.t.)	Raufoss
Bryne	3–0	Vidar
Dale Fjaler	0–3	Varegg
Djerv 1919	1–3 (a.e.t.)	Os
Eik	1–0	Fram (Larvik)
Haugar	5–2	Stord
Jerv	0–1	Start
Kongsvinger	1–2	Fredrikstad
Kristiansund	1–2	Molde
Kvik (Halden)	1–0	Frigg
Larvik Turn	2–1	Skeid
Lillehammer	3–1	Røros
Lyngen	0–3	Tromsø
Mjølner	2–0	Bodø/Glimt
Mjøndalen	3–0	Strømsgodset
Mo	3–0	Mosjøen
Moss	8–1	Steinberg
Neset	0–2	Nessegutten
Sander	1–4	Lillestrøm
Skarbøvik	2–0	Tornado
Sola	0–4	Viking
Steinkjer	1–0	Stjørdals/Blink
Storm	1–3	Pors
Sunndal	0–2	Strindheim
Ull/Kisa	2–0	HamKam
Vålerengen	0–1	Eidsvold Turn
Ørn	4–0	Odd

== Third round ==
Team 1	Score	Team 2
24 July 1979
Nessegutten	3–1	Mo
25 July 1979
Fredrikstad	1–0 (a.e.t.)	Kvik (Halden)
Lyn	3–1	Larvik Turn
Lillestrøm	3–0	Eik
Eidsvold Turn	1–1 (a.e.t.)	Mjøndalen
Lillehammer	1–0	Moss
Raufoss	4–1	Ull/Kisa
Pors	0–1	Bryne
Start	3–1	Ørn
Klepp	0–1 (a.e.t.)	Viking
Os	1–1 (a.e.t.)	Haugar
Varegg	1–3 (a.e.t.)	Brann
Bergsøy	1–3	Rosenborg
Molde	4–2	Skarbøvik
Strindheim	3–1	Steinkjer
Tromsø	1–2	Mjølner
Replay: 2 August 1979
Mjøndalen	1–1 (a.e.t.)	Eidsvold Turn
Haugar	1–0	Os
2nd replay: 8 August 1979
Eidsvold Turn	2–3 (a.e.t.) (Note: Played at Nadderud Stadion in Bærum.)	Mjøndalen

== Fourth round ==
Team 1	Score	Team 2
12 August 1979
Fredrikstad	6–2 (a.e.t.)	Nessegutten
Lillehammer	0–3	Lillestrøm
Mjøndalen	3–0	Lyn
Bryne	4–0	Molde
Viking	1–0 (a.e.t.)	Raufoss
Haugar	2–0	Start
Brann	2–1	Strindheim
Mjølner	3–3 (a.e.t.)	Rosenborg
Replay: 16 August 1979
Rosenborg	4–2	Mjølner

== Quarter-finals ==
26 August 1979

Fredrikstad	0–3	Mjøndalen
		Solberg 18' (pen.); Olsen 60'; Sarr 83'

Fredrikstad Stadion, Fredrikstad
Attendance: 8,713
Referee: Ivar Fredriksen

26 August 1979

Haugar	5–0	Bryne
Hovland 5', 90'; Mooney 22'; Christophersen 78'; Larsen 82'

Haugesund Stadion, Haugesund
Attendance: 8,200
Referee: Frank Skadal

26 August 1979

Rosenborg	0–1	Viking
		Svendsen 45'

Lerkendal Stadion, Trondheim
Attendance: 9,444
Referee: Einar Halle

27 August 1979

Lillestrøm	1–2	Brann
Erlandsen 20'		Pedersen 47'; Tronstad 90'

Åråsen Stadion, Lillestrøm
Attendance: 4,615
Referee: Thorbjørn Aass

== Semi-finals ==
23 September 1979

Mjøndalen	1–3	Haugar
Olsen 86'		Larsen 24'; Nilsen 35', 80'

Nedre Eiker Stadion, Mjøndalen
Attendance: 9,311
Referee: Reidar Bjørnestad

23 September 1979

Viking	1–0	Brann
Svendsen 15'

Stavanger Stadion, Stavanger
Attendance: 15,720
Referee: Henry Øberg

== Final ==
21 October 1979
13:15 CET (UTC+1)

Viking	2–1	Haugar
Berntsen 55' (pen.); Vikanes 62' (o.g.)	Report	Mooney 25'

Ullevaal Stadion, Oslo
Attendance: 25,000
Referee: Ivar Fredriksen (Lillestrøm)
