= Dean Mooney =

English footballer

Personal information
- Date of birth: 24 July 1956 (age 70)
- Place of birth: Paddington, England
- Position: Forward

Senior career*
Years	Team	Apps	(Gls)
1974–1976	Orient	22	(3)
1976–1978	Walthamstow Avenue		
1978–1979	Haugar		
1980	GAIS	21	(7)
1980–1982	Bournemouth	27	(10)
1982–1983	Vasalund		
1983	IF Viken	2	(0)
1983–1984	Road Sea Southampton		
1984	Trowbridge Town	3	(0)
1984–1985	Torquay United	15	(2)
1985–1986	Road Sea Southampton		
- * Club domestic league appearances and goals

Dean Francis Mooney (born 24 July 1956) is an English former professional footballer who played in the Football League as a forward.

== Career ==
Mooney went abroad to Norway in 1978 to play 3rd Division football with Haugar, joining fellow Englishmen Dennis Burnett (manager) and Barry Salvage. Mooney was a great hit from the start and was the club's top scorer for the two season he was at the club. After winning promotion to the second division in 1978, Haugar went all the way to the 1979 Norwegian Football Cup final, and Mooney put them 1-0 up against Viking with a trademark header. A dubious penalty and an own-goal turned the match around after half-time, in what was to be Mooney's last game for the club. He then joined GAIS for the 1980 season, in which he played 21 matches and scored seven goals.
