= Saihou =

Saihou is a Gambian masculine given name. Notable people with the name include:

- Saihou Gassama (born 1993), Gambian football midfielder
- Saihou Jagne (born 1986), Swedish-Gambian football striker
- Saihou Sarr (born 1951), Gambian footballer
