= List of Beşiktaş J.K captains =

This is a list of Beşiktaş J.K captains.

== Captains ==
Period	Name
1911–1931	(Turkey) Şeref Bey
1931–1948	(Turkey) Hakkı Yeten
1948–1954	(Turkey) Süleyman Seba
1954–1959	(Turkey) Recep Adanır
1959–1962	(Turkey) Nazmi Bilge
1962–1968	(Turkey) Necmi Mutlu
1968–1975	(Turkey) Sanlı Sarıalioğlu
1975–1978	(Turkey) Zekeriya Alp
1978–1980	(Turkey) Rasim Kara
1980–1983	(Turkey) Mehmet Ekşi
1983–1988	(Turkey) Samet Aybaba
1988–1996	(Turkey) Rıza Çalımbay
1996–1998	(Turkey) Recep Çetin
1998–2001	(Turkey) Mehmet Özdilek
2001–2006	(Turkey) Tayfur Havutçu
2006–2008	(Turkey) İbrahim Üzülmez
2008–2009	(Argentina) Matías Delgado
2009–2011	(Turkey) İbrahim Üzülmez
2011–2014	(Turkey) İbrahim Toraman
2014–2019	(Turkey) Tolga Zengin
2019–2020	(Turkey) Burak Yılmaz
2020–2023	(Canada) Atiba Hutchinson
2023–2025	(Turkey) Necip Uysal
2025–present	(Turkey) Orkun Kökçü
