= Ronny van Poucke =

Dutch footballer

Personal information
- Full name: Ronny van Poucke
- Date of birth: 10 February 1957
- Place of birth: IJzendijke, Netherlands
- Date of death: 3 October 2016 (aged 59)
- Place of death: IJzendijke, Netherlands
- Position: Striker

Senior career*
Years	Team	Apps	(Gls)
1975–1978	RSC Anderlecht	39	(19)
1978–1979	KV Kortrijk	33	(15)
1979–1980	Lierse SK	25	(5)
1980–1981	Thor Waterschei	18	(12)
1981–1984	K Beerschot VAC	61	(23)
1984–1989	RAA Louviéroise	82	(70)
Total		258	(144)

International career
1977–1978	Netherlands U21	7	(1)
- * Club domestic league appearances and goals

Ronny van Poucke (10 February 1957, in IJzendijke – 3 October 2016, in IJzendijke) was a Dutch footballer who played as striker. From his youth until his retirement he was active in Belgium.

== Honours ==
=== Player ===
RSC Anderlecht

- Belgian Cup: 1975-76
- European Cup Winners' Cup: 1975–76 (winners), 1976-77 (runners-up), 1977–78 (winners)
- European Super Cup: 1976
- Amsterdam Tournament: 1976
- Tournoi de Paris: 1977
- Jules Pappaert Cup: 1977
- Belgian Sports Merit Award: 1978
