= Eirik Bakke =

Norwegian footballer (born 1977)

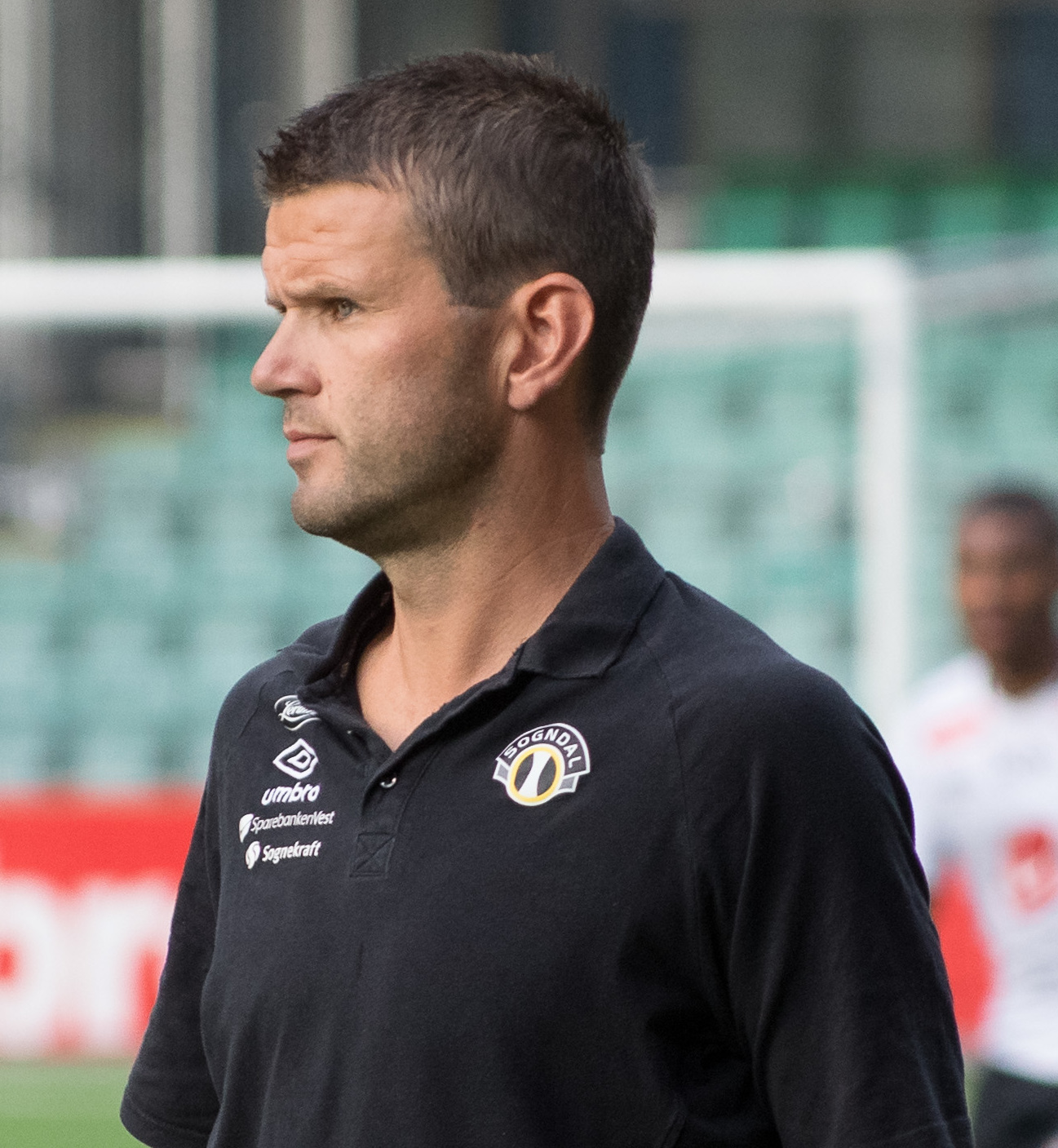
- Bakke with Sogndal in 2016

Personal information
- Date of birth: 13 September 1977 (age 49)
- Place of birth: Sogndal, Norway
- Height: 1.88 m (6 ft 2 in)
- Position: Midfielder

Youth career
- Sogndal

Senior career*
Years	Team	Apps	(Gls)
1993–1999	Sogndal	99	(18)
1999–2006	Leeds United	143	(8)
2005–2006	→ Aston Villa (loan)	14	(0)
2006–2010	Brann	82	(8)
2011–2012	Sogndal	38	(1)
Total		386	(35)

International career
1996–1999	Norway U21	28	(2)
1999–2008	Norway	27	(0)

Managerial career
- 2015–2021: Sogndal
- 2023: Lillestrøm (caretaker)
- 2024–2026: Åsane
- 2026–: Sogndal (caretaker)
- * Club domestic league appearances and goals

Eirik Bakke (born 13 September 1977) is a Norwegian football coach and a former professional player who played as a midfielder.

His son Johan Johanessen Bakke, is also a footballer, currently playing for Strømsgodset.

== Club career ==
=== Sogndal (1993–1999) ===
Bakke played 99 matches for Sogndal. His father Svein had previously also played for the team.

=== Leeds United (1999–2006) ===
Bakke was bought by Leeds United in 1999 from Sogndal for £1.75 million. After an encouraging start to his career at Leeds in 1999 and 2000, injuries and poor form meant that he was never a first-team regular, even after the club was relegated from the Premiership in 2004.

Bakke's career was set back by recurring knee injuries. Patella tendinitis kept him out of the team for the start of the 2004–05 season and he tore a cruciate ligament on his return in January 2005. In August 2005, having recovered from his injury, Bakke was loaned to Aston Villa, but the loan was ended early after Leeds told Aston Villa that they wished to let Bakke go permanently, rather than on loan, and Villa chairman Doug Ellis decided against buying him.

Speculation continued over Bakke's future when he was left out of the Leeds United squad for the match against Sheffield Wednesday on 27 August 2006, with some in the press and supporters speculating that this was due to an imminent transfer. The club released a statement on 29 August 2006 effectively confirming that Bakke would be leaving Leeds United, but Bakke said that he would like to stay, and continued training with Leeds despite not playing, not wanting to return to playing in Norway at that time. The problem arose due to his £23,000-a-week wages and £4,000 appearance fees, which were originally agreed during Peter Ridsdale's chairmanship, but which the club could no longer afford. Leeds United tried to resolve the issue by offering Bakke lower wages to stay at the club, but his agent stated he wanted the contractually agreed wage. Eventually, Bakke left the club, as part of a wider attempt by Leeds United to reduce expenditure on player wages.

=== Brann (2006–2010) ===
On 31 August 2006, Bakke signed a two-year deal with Brann, and returned to Norway. The deal was financed by Hardball. Some media outlets claimed that Bakke and Brann had a "gentlemen's agreement", that Bakke could leave Brann if a larger club wanted to sign him, which Brann denied.

Bakke debuted for Brann on 11 September 2006 against Stabæk. He started the 2007 season playing for Brann second team while returning to full fitness from his injury problems. He experienced an erratic season, making his first full Tippeliga start on 26 June 2007. He scored the winning goal against the club's arch-rivals Rosenborg on 11 August 2007.

Bakke promised Brann that when he was close to retirement he would finish his career in Norway with the club, playing a further one or two seasons. In the run-up to the 2008 season, Bakke became captain of Brann. On 30 May 2008, Bakke extended his Brann deal to 2010, but with a clause permitting him to re-evaluate his deal if the club decided to lay artificial turf at Brann Stadion. A few weeks later, Brann announced that the club would continue with natural grass as the turf at Brann Stadion for the coming years.

=== Sogndal (2011–2012) ===
Bakke signed a two-year deal with Sogndal in 2011. In November 2012 he retired from active football.

== International career ==
Bakke made his debut for Norway in a January 1999 friendly against Israel, coming on as a substitute for Egil Østenstad, and earned 26 caps, without scoring any goals. His last international match was a March 2008 friendly against Montenegro, coming on as a substitute for Martin Andresen.

== Career statistics ==
Appearances and goals by club, season and competition
Club	Season	League			National cup (Note: includes FA Cup, and Norwegian Football Cup.)		League cup		Continental (Note: Include Champions League and UEFA Cup.)		Total	
Club	Season	Division	Apps	Goals	Apps	Goals	Apps	Goals	Apps	Goals	Apps	Goals
Leeds United	1999–2000	Premier League	29	2	3	4	2	0	10	2	44	8
Leeds United	2000–01	Premier League	29	2	2	0	1	0	12	1	44	3
Leeds United	2001–02	Premier League	27	2	0	0	2	1	6	1	35	4
Leeds United	2002–03	Premier League	34	1	4	2	1	0	6	1	45	4
Leeds United	2003–04	Premier League	10	1	1	0	0	0	–		11	1
Leeds United	2004–05	Championship	1	0	0	0	0	0	–		1	0
Leeds United	2005–06	Championship	9	0	0	0	0	0	–		9	0
Leeds United	2006–07	Championship	3	0	0	0	1	1	–		4	1
Leeds United	Total		142	8	10	6	7	2	34	5	193	21
Aston Villa (loan)	2005–06	Premier League	14	0	0	0	3	0	–		14	0
Brann	2006	Tippeligaen	7	0	0	0	–		–		7	0
Brann	2007	Tippeligaen	10	1	3	0	–		0	0	13	1
Brann	2008	Tippeligaen	21	0	1	0	–		2	0	24	0
Brann	2009	Tippeligaen	18	2	3	1	–		–		21	3
Brann	2010	Tippeligaen	26	5	0	0	–		–		26	5
Brann	Total		82	8	7	1	0	0	2	0	91	9
Sogndal	2011	Tippeligaen	19	1	0	0	–		–		19	1
Sogndal	2012	Tippeligaen	19	0	1	0	–		–		20	0
Sogndal	Total		38	1	1	0	0	0	0	0	39	2
Career total			276	17	18	7	10	2	36	5	340	31

== Managerial statistics ==
Updated 8 November 2026

Team	From	To	Record				
Team	From	To	G	W	D	L	Win %
Sogndal	1 January 2015	31 December 2021	222	100	50	72	45.05
Lillestrøm	20 August 2023	21 December 2023	12	4	2	6	33.33
Åsane	30 July 2024	6 February 2026	50	17	13	20	34.00
Sogndal (caretaker)	26 June 2026		20	6	4	10	30.00
Total			304	127	69	108	41.78

== Honours ==
Brann

- Norwegian Premier League: 2007

Individual

- Norwegian Football Association Gold Watch – 11 June 2003
