= Arve Mokkelbost =

Former Norwegian football coach

Personal information
- Date of birth: 9 August 1945 (age 81)
- Place of birth: Norway

Managerial career
- Years: Team
- 1978–1979: Karlstad BK
- 1980–1981: Djurgårdens IF
- 1982–1983: Brann

Arve Mokkelbost (born 9 August 1945) is a former Norwegian football coach and official.

Mokkelbost hails from Frei Municipality (now part of Kristiansund Municipality). He was a talented footballer and speed skater and was a part of Clausenengen administrative staff in addition to coaching the wrestlers in Kristiansund Atletklubb. Mokkelbost moved to Oslo at the age of 18 to study school of education, and the next year he became head coach of the football club KFUM-Kameratene Oslo.

Mokkelbost later studied at Norwegian School of Sport Sciences and Winona State University and was coaching the Norwegian under-19 football team at the age of 25. He also coached Frigg, Ready and Holmen, and has worked in the Football Association of Norway.

Mokkelbost was in charge of the Swedish club Karlstad BK between 1978 and 1979 and Djurgårdens IF between 1980 and 1981. He was the head coach of Norwegian club Brann between 1982 and 1983, where he won the Norwegian Cup in 1982. From 1984 to 1989 he was working as marketing director at Brann. From 2005 to 2006 he was administrative director of Fredrikstad.
