= Anders Stadheim =

Norwegian footballer (born 1980)

Personal information
- Full name: Anders Fossøy Stadheim
- Date of birth: 14 August 1980 (age 46)
- Place of birth: Sogndal, Norway
- Height: 1.91 m (6 ft 3 in)
- Position: Midfielder

Youth career
- Heming/Ready

Senior career*
Years	Team	Apps	(Gls)
1999–2006	Sogndal	157	(18)
2006–2008	Fredrikstad	8	(0)
2007	→ Sogndal (loan)	9	(1)
2008	→ Sogndal (loan)	20	(2)
2009	Sogndal	12	(1)

International career
2001	Norway U21	2	(0)
2004	Norway	2	(1)
- * Club domestic league appearances and goals

Anders Fossøy Stadheim (born August 14, 1980) is a former Norwegian footballer, who played for Fredrikstad FK and Sogndal. His position was as a midfielder. He was capped twice for Norway, scoring one goal.

His father Ingvar is a former player and manager of the Norwegian national side.
