= Dennis Burnett =

English footballer

Personal information
- Full name: Dennis Henry Burnett
- Date of birth: 27 September 1944 (age 82)
- Place of birth: Bermondsey, London, England
- Position: Defender

Youth career
- West Ham United

Senior career*
| Years | Team | Apps | (Gls) |
| 1965–1967 | West Ham United | 50 | (0) |
| 1967–1974 | Millwall | 257 | (3) |
| 1974–1975 | Hull City | 46 | (2) |
| 1974–1975 | → Millwall (loan) | 6 | (2) |
| 1975 | St. Louis Stars | 21 | (4) |
| 1975–1977 | Brighton & Hove Albion | 44 | (1) |
| 1977 | Ilford | | |
| 1977 | St. Louis Stars | 19 | (0) |
| 1977 | Shamrock Rovers | 10 | (0) |
| 1978–1981 | SK Haugar | | |
| 1994 | Lancing | | |
- * Club domestic league appearances and goals

Dennis Burnett (born 27 September 1944) is an English former football defender.

== Club career ==
He started his career as a youth team player at West Ham United, making his first team debut in October 1965. He played 66 games in all competitions for West Ham scoring three goals. In 1967 Burnett moved to Millwall, for £15,000, where he made over 250 appearances, taking over the captaincy whenever Harry Cripps was injured. In October 1973, for £70,000, he signed for Hull City. He also played for St. Louis Stars, Brighton & Hove Albion and Shamrock Rovers.

Burnett signed for Shamrock Rovers under John Giles in October 1977 and made his debut the same day as Gordon Banks made his League of Ireland debut. He made a total of 11 appearances before departing in December 1977. Burnett went on to be assistant manager with Sussex side, Lancing and played in their 2–1 defeat by Horsham YMCA in the FA Cup in 1994, a month before his 50th birthday.

With Norwegian club SK Haugar he lost the 1979 Norwegian Football Cup final.

== After football ==
Burnett ran a painting and decorating firm in the south of England after retiring from football and has been involved in club hospitality for West Ham United at Upton Park.

== Honours ==
West Ham United

- Football League Cup runner-up: 1965–66

== Sources ==
- Paul Doolan; Robert Goggins. The Hoops. ISBN 0-7171-2121-6.
