= Ab Gritter =

Dutch footballer

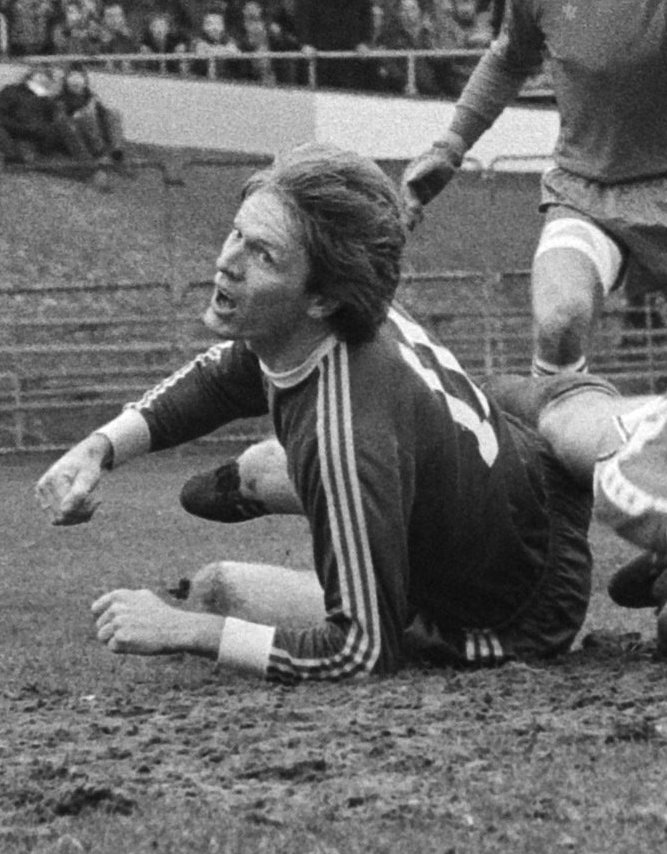
- Ab Gritter against Utrecht, 1981.

Personal information
- Full name: Albert Jan Gritter
- Date of birth: 22 July 1949 (age 77)
- Place of birth: Beilen, Netherlands
- Date of death: 16 October 2008 (aged 59)
- Place of death: Havelte, Netherlands
- Position: Striker

Senior career*
Years	Team	Apps	(Gls)
1968–1972	ACV		
1972–1975	Groningen	103	(37)
1975–1982	Twente	218	(55)
1982–1983	Kolding		
1983–1986	Heracles	79	(6)
Total		400	(98)

Managerial career
- 1989–1990: Heerenveen
- * Club domestic league appearances and goals

Albert Jan "Ab" Gritter (22 July 1949 – 16 October 2008) was a Dutch footballer who played as a forward.

Born in Beilen, he played for ACV Assen before starting his professional career in 1972 at FC Groningen. He totalled 43 goals in 116 official games for the club. Gritter then spent several years in FC Twente, before spending his later career in Danish club Kolding IF and back home with SC Heracles '74. Over 10 seasons in the Eredivisie, Gritter amassed 312 games and 73 goals. Outside of the Netherlands, he is best known as the overall (joint) top goalscorer of the 1977–78 European Cup Winners' Cup.

Gritter was a coach after his playing career, managing Heerenveen and working for two Danish clubs, Heracles, Dundee United, MSC Meppel and lastly for amateur team Wacker-Van Dijk in De Wijk.

He lived in Havelte and worked as a gym teacher in Emmen when he passed away in October 2008, only 59 years old.
