= Isak Arne Refvik =

Norwegian footballer and coach (born 1956)

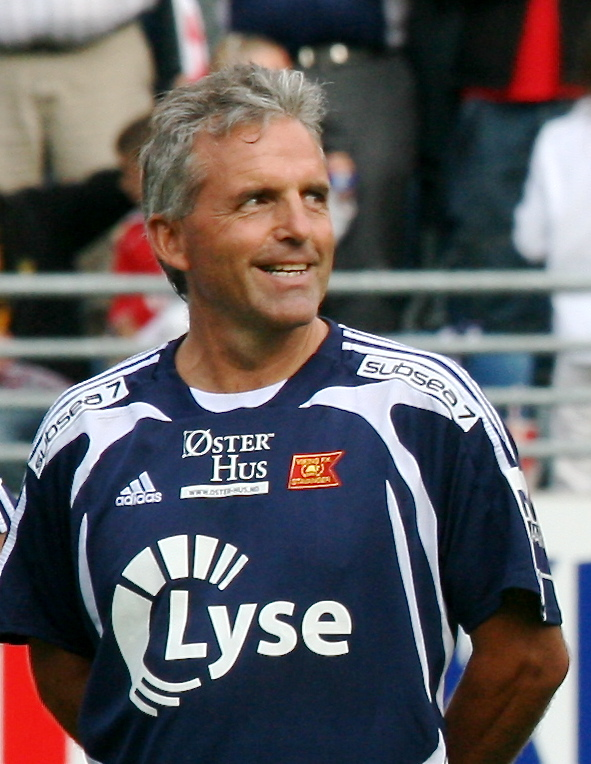

Personal information
- Date of birth: 25 December 1956 (age 69)
- Place of birth: Bergen, Norway
- Height: 1.69 m (5 ft 7 in)
- Position: Forward

Senior career*
Years	Team	Apps	(Gls)
1976–1978	Viking FK	114	(41)
1978–1979	Hibernian	7	(2)
1979–1986	Viking FK	293	(45)
Total		414	(88)

International career
1978–1983	Norway	7	(1)
- * Club domestic league appearances and goals

Isak Arne Refvik (born 25 December 1956) is a Norwegian association football coach and former player. He scored 86 goals in 407 games for Viking FK, and played in one season for Scottish team Hibernian together with fellow Norwegian Svein Mathisen. Refvik was capped seven times by Norway.

Isak Arne Refvik became league champion for Viking in 1979 and 1982, and helped win the cup title against SK Haugar in 1979.

Standing at 1.69 metres tall, Refvik was known as a nimble and quick player who dispreferred aerial play.
