= Steinar Aase =

Norwegian footballer (born 1955)

Personal information
- Full name: Steinar Aase
- Date of birth: 15 April 1955 (age 71)
- Place of birth: Bergen, Norway
- Position: Forward

Youth career
- –1973: Brann

Senior career*
Years	Team	Apps	(Gls)
1973–1979	Brann	119	(50)
1980–1983	Start	72	(28)
1984–1985	Brann	35	(13)
Total		226	(91)

International career
1974–1978	Norway U21	7	(1)
1976–1978	Norway	6	(0)
- * Club domestic league appearances and goals

Steinar Aase (born 15 April 1955) is a retired Norwegian footballer who played for Brann and Start as a forward. He was capped six times by Norway at the international level and scored 81 goals in 211 appearances at the highest level of Norwegian football.

== Club career ==
Aase began his career with Brann and made his debut in a Norwegian Cup match against Arna-Bjørnar in 1973, coming on as a substitute to score a hat-trick. He scored nine league goals in his first three seasons, with seven of them scored during the 1975 First Division campaign where Brann finished as runners-up behind Viking. Aase formed a partnership with Bjørn Tronstad upon the latter's arrival. They both scored in the 1976 Norwegian Cup Final as Brann defeated Sogndal 2–1 to claim their fourth title. Aase scored 15 goals in 22 league games during the 1976 season. Brann finished in mid-table over the next two campaigns with Aase scoring 26 league goals during that time before a knee injury suffered ahead of the 1979 season meant he missed the entire campaign. Without him, Brann were relegated to the Second Division.

Having recovered from injury, Aase was transferred to Start ahead of the 1980 season. Joining Svein Mathisen in attack, Start were crowned Norwegian champions for the second time. Aase scored the decisive goal in a 4–3 win against Rosenborg on the final day of the season as Start won the title by virtue of a better goal difference than Bryne. He spent three more seasons with Start, scoring 28 league goals for the club in total, before returning to Brann in 1984. Aase scored ten goals in 15 league games during the 1984 campaign as Brann was promoted back to the First Division. He retired at the end of the 1985 season. Aase returned to Brann in the 1990s as a coach and went on to be employed by the club's marketing department.

== International career ==
He made his senior international debut for Norway against Denmark on 25 August 1976. He appeared again the following month against Sweden and went on to gain four more caps over the next two years. Prior to being selected for the senior team, Aase represented Norway at the under-21 level. He made seven appearances over a four-year period, scoring one goal – against Finland.

== Honours ==
Brann

- Norwegian Cup: 1976

Start

- Norwegian First Division: 1980
