= Ronny Støbakk =

Norwegian footballer (born 1973)

Personal information
- Date of birth: 11 March 1973 (age 53)
- Position: Midfielder

Youth career
- –1992: Rosenborg

Senior career*
Years	Team	Apps	(Gls)
1993–1994	Rosenborg	9	(2)
1995–1997	Strindheim		
- Malvik
- Gimse
- * Club domestic league appearances and goals

Ronny Støbakk (born 11 March 1973) is a retired Norwegian football midfielder.

He played for the junior team of Rosenborg BK, and ahead of the 1993 season he was drafted into the first team. Together with Helge Aune he was the first player in recent years to achieve this feat.

In 1993 and 1994 he amassed nine league games, scoring two goals. He also got four games in the Norwegian Football Cup as well as one UEFA Champions League game without scoring. He then joined Strindheim IL, who had won promotion to the Norwegian Premier League. The team was relegated, and after the 1997 season Støbakk mainly played for Malvik IL. He is a lifelong Ipswich Town FC supporter and won the Norwegian Supporters cup playing for Ipswich Norway in 2018 where he was named best player of the tournament and again in 2019 competing against 36 other Norwegian supporter clubs of British football clubs.
