= Ivar J. Hauge =

Norwegian politician (1936–2017)

Ivar Johannes Hauge (16 May 1936 – 5 March 2017) was a Norwegian agronomist, teacher and politician for the Centre Party.

He was born at Boslangen in Våler, Østfold. After finishing his secondary education in Moss he eventually graduated from the Norwegian College of Agriculture in 1962. He was hired as a teacher at Tomb Agricultural School in 1966. In 1990 he was hired as a rural area developer in Landbruksbanken, retiring in 2000. He was married, had three daughters and resided at the family farm Boslangen from 1973. Hauge was also an avid local historian, and engaged in the local church.

Hauge was elected to Våler municipal council and Østfold county council, both for three terms, and also served as deputy mayor of Våler. He served as a deputy representative to the Parliament of Norway from Østfold during the term 1973–1977. In total he met during 21 days of parliamentary session. He was decorated with the King's Medal of Merit.
