= Ulf Moen =

Norwegian footballer (born 1958)

Personal information
- Date of birth: 6 April 1958 (age 68)

International career
Years	Team	Apps	(Gls)
1984–1985	Norway	4	(0)

Ulf Moen (born 6 April 1958) is a Norwegian footballer. He played in four matches for the Norway national football team from 1984 to 1985.
