= Ingvald Huseklepp =

Norwegian footballer (born 1949)

Johan Ingvald Huseklepp (born 17 August 1949) is a Norwegian former footballer who played four seasons for SK Brann. He won the Norwegian Football Cup with Brann in 1976 and was losing finalist in 1978.

He is the father of Erik Huseklepp.
