= Tonning Hammer =

Norwegian footballer (born 1956)

Personal information
- Full name: Tonning Geir Hammer
- Date of birth: 4 August 1956 (age 70)
- Position: Left back

Senior career*
Years	Team	Apps	(Gls)
1976–1977	Vidar		
1978–1985	Viking	152	(6)
1986	Madla		
1987	Vidar		

International career
1974–1975	Norway U19	11	(0)
1975–1977	Norway U21	10	(0)
1982	Norway	1	(0)
- * Club domestic league appearances and goals

Tonning Hammer (born 4 August 1956) is a Norwegian footballer who spent most of his career in Viking. He was a youth and U21 international and played in one match for the Norway national football team in 1982.

== Honours ==
Viking

- League champion: 1979, 1982
- Cup champion: 1979
