= Yngve Andersen =

Norwegian footballer (born 1948)

Personal information
- Date of birth: 6 June 1948 (age 78)
- Position: Midfielder

International career
| Years | Team | Apps | (Gls) |
| 1978 | Norway | 2 | (0) |

Yngve Andersen (born 6 June 1948) is a Norwegian footballer. He played in two matches for the Norway national football team in 1978.
