= Finn Vådahl =

Norwegian footballer (born 1950)

Personal information
- Date of birth: 19 September 1950 (age 76)

International career
Years	Team	Apps	(Gls)
1976	Norway	1	(0)

Finn Vådahl (born 19 September 1950) is a Norwegian footballer. He played in one match for the Norway national football team in 1976.
