= Jarle Ødegaard =

Norwegian footballer (born 1959)

Personal information
- Date of birth: 9 March 1959 (age 67)

International career
Years	Team	Apps	(Gls)
1983	Norway	1	(0)

Jarle Ødegaard (born 9 March 1959) is a Norwegian footballer. He played in one match for the Norway national football team in 1983.
