= Arnt Kortgaard =

Norwegian footballer (born 1957)

Personal information
- Date of birth: 13 October 1957 (age 69)

International career
Years	Team	Apps	(Gls)
1983–1987	Norway	4	(0)

Arnt Kortgaard (born 13 October 1957) is a Norwegian footballer. He played in four matches for the Norway national football team from 1983 to 1987.
