= Per Henriksen (Norwegian footballer) =

Norwegian footballer (1952–2024)

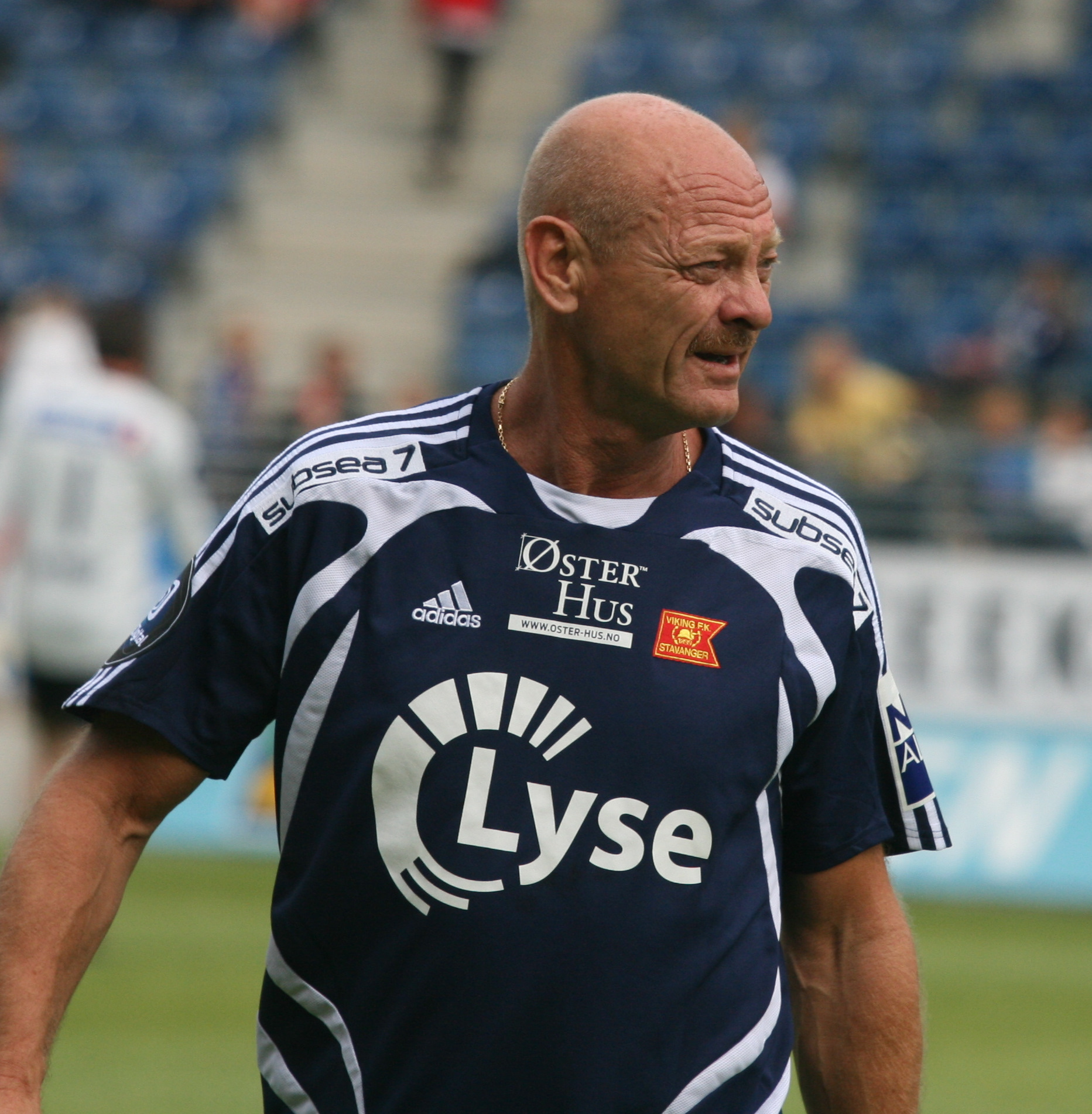
- Henriksen in 2008

Personal information
- Date of birth: 10 April 1952
- Place of birth: Stavanger, Norway
- Date of death: 17 April 2024 (aged 72)
- Place of death: Stavanger, Norway
- Position: Central defender

Senior career*
Years	Team	Apps	(Gls)
1978–1986	Viking	180	(11)

International career
1983–1984	Norway	10	(0)
- * Club domestic league appearances and goals

Per Henriksen (10 April 1952 – 17 April 2024) was a Norwegian footballer who played as a central defender.

A native of Stavanger, Henriksen spent the early years of his career with lower-division Brodd before joining Viking in 1978 at the relatively mature age of 26, as replacement for Reidar Goa who had retired at the end of the previous season. In nine seasons at Viking, Henriksen won the Norwegian League twice (1979 and 1982), and won the Norwegian Cup in 1979. He was capped ten times for Norway.

He died on 17 April 2024, at the age of 72.

== Honours ==
Viking

- Norwegian First Division: 1979, 1982
- Norwegian Cup: 1979
