= Saihou Sarr =

Gambian footballer (born 1951)

Personal information
- Full name: Sereign Saihou Sarr
- Date of birth: 16 August 1951 (age 75)
- Place of birth: The Gambia
- Position: Midfielder

Senior career*
Years	Team	Apps	(Gls)
- Real de Banjul FC
1976-1979	Mjøndalen IF		

International career
1979-1983	The Gambia	2+	(0+)
- * Club domestic league appearances and goals

Saihou Sarr (born 16 August 1951 in The Gambia) is a Gambian retired footballer.
