= Zekeriya Alp =

Turkish footballer, businessman, and sports executive

Personal information
- Full name: Zekeriya Alp
- Date of birth: 1 January 1948 (age 78)
- Place of birth: Tetovo, SFR Yugoslavia
- Position: Defender

Youth career
- 1965–1966: Feriköy S.K.

Senior career*
| Years | Team | Apps | (Gls) |
| 1966–1968 | Feriköy S.K. | 30 | (1) |
| 1968–1978 | Beşiktaş | 235 | (6) |

International career
| 1967 | Turkey U-18 | 2 | (0) |
| 1970 | Turkey U-21 | 3 | (0) |
| 1964–1971 | Turkey | 22 | (0) |
- * Club domestic league appearances and goals

Zekeriya Alp (born 1 January 1948) is a Turkish former international association football player and, current businessman and sports executive. He represented Turkey at senior level in 22 international encounters. Alp formerly took role of "Head of Central Referee Commission" at TFF.

== Career ==
Following his youth and first two senior years at 1. Lig, Alp joined Beşiktaş in 1968–69 season. He played at Beşiltaş until the end of his professional career.

Zekeriya Alp was appointed twice as Head of Central Referee Commission at TFF. His first appointment was between 2012 and 2014 during the presidency of Yıldırım Demirören. In 2019, he appointed once again for same title following election of Nihat Özdemir.

== Honours ==
Beşiktaş

- Turkish Cup (1): 1974–75 Turkish Cup
- Presidential Cup (1): 1974
- Prime Minister's Cup (2): 1974, 1977
- TSYD Cup (3): 1971–72, 1972–73, 1974–75
- Spor Toto Cup (1): 1969

=== Individual ===
- Beşiktaş J.K. Squads of Century (Golden Team)
