= Ingvar Stadheim =

Norwegian footballer and coach (born 1951)

Personal information
- Date of birth: 9 February 1951 (age 75)
- Place of birth: Norway

Senior career*
Years	Team	Apps	(Gls)
- Sogndal

Managerial career
- 1979–1980: Sogndal
- 1983–1984: Sogndal
- 1986: Kongsvinger
- 1986–1988: Norway U21
- 1988–1990: Norway
- * Club domestic league appearances and goals

Ingvar Stadheim (born 9 February 1951) is a Norwegian football coach and former player. His son Anders is also a football player.

== Playing career ==
Stadheim played for Sogndal.

== Coaching career ==
Stadheim managed Norwegian clubs Sogndal and Kongsvinger, and later managed the Norwegian under-21 side between 1986 and 1988, and the Norwegian national side between 1988 and 1990.
