= Nils Ove Hellvik =

Norwegian footballer (born 1962)

Personal information
- Full name: Nils Ove Hellvik
- Date of birth: 25 July 1962 (age 64)
- Place of birth: Stavanger, Norway
- Position: Striker

Youth career
- Frøyland

Senior career*
Years	Team	Apps	(Gls)
1979–1982	Bryne	55	(14)
1983–1987	Viking	97	(37)
1988	Bryne	22	(3)
1989–1990	Ålgård		

International career
1982–1987	Norway	5	(0)
- * Club domestic league appearances and goals

Nils Ove Hellvik (born 25 July 1962) is a Norwegian former professional footballer who as a striker played for Bryne FK and Viking FK. In the Norwegian top league Hellvik played 77 games and scored 17 goals for Bryne, and played 97 games and scored 37 goals for Viking between 1983 and 1987. He won five caps for Norway.

Hellvik's transfer from Bryne to Viking in 1982 became one of the most bitter and controversial transfers in Norwegian football history. At this time, a player who moved to a new club had to serve a 12-month "quarantine" before he was cleared to play for his new club, unless the old club agreed to waive the quarantine, which in practice usually meant paying a transfer fee. Hellvik was under contract with Bryne until the end of the 1982 season, and when he announced that he intended to join Viking, Bryne flat-out refused to negotiate until his contract had expired, and Hellvik refused to return to Bryne. For this reason, Hellvik was forced to sit out the entire 1982 season.
