= Svein Bakke =

Norwegian footballer (1953-2015)

Personal information
- Date of birth: 23 June 1953
- Date of death: 16 December 2015 (aged 62)

Senior career*
Years	Team	Apps	(Gls)
1971–1990	Sogndal	514	(321)
- * Club domestic league appearances and goals

Svein Bakke (23 June 1953 – 16 December 2015) was a Norwegian footballer who played for Sogndal Fotball from 1971 to 1990. Bakke was central player when Sogndal, faced Brann in the 1976 Norwegian Football Cup. Bakke played 514 matches over his nineteen-year career and scored 321 goals (in all competitions, including friendlies).

Bakke served Sogndal in an administrative position until 2005, aside from one year (1999) with Wimbledoon in England. Bakke later worked in the private sector.

Svein Bakke was the father of former Leeds United and Norway midfielder Eirik Bakke, who was Sogndal's manager 2015-2021.
