= Gary Goodchild =

English footballer (born 1958)

Personal information
- Date of birth: 27 January 1958 (age 68)
- Place of birth: Chelmsford, England
- Position: Forward

Senior career*
Years	Team	Apps	(Gls)
1974–1976	Arsenal	0	(0)
1976–1977	Hereford United	4	(0)
1977–1978	Reading	1	(0)
1978–1979	Kramfors		
1979–1981	Crystal Palace	2	(0)
1981–1985	Viking	78	(24)
Total		375	(5)

International career
1973	England Schoolboys	2	(0)

Managerial career
- 1993–1994: Bryne FK
- 2007–2016: Viking (scout)
- 2012: Viking (caretaker)
- 2017–: Wolverhampton Wanderers (scout)
- * Club domestic league appearances and goals

Gary Goodchild (born 27 January 1958 in Chelmsford) is an English former footballer who played in the Football League for Arsenal, Crystal Palace, Hereford United and Reading.

He works as a scout for Wolverhampton Wanderers.
