= Arne Møller =

Norwegian footballer (born 1960)

Personal information
- Date of birth: 6 April 1960 (age 66)
- Position: Midfielder

Senior career*
Years	Team	Apps	(Gls)
1978	Helgerød IL		
1979–1988	Brann		
1988–1990	Aris Thessaloniki	47	(1)

International career
1986–1987	Norway	4	(0)

Managerial career
- 1992–1994: Fana
- 1999: Voss
- 2005–2010: Sandviken
- 2014: Avaldsnes
- * Club domestic league appearances and goals

Arne Møller (born 6 April 1960) is a Norwegian former professional football player and coach.

== Career ==
Møller played as a midfielder for Helgerød IL, Brann and Aris Thessaloniki.

He earned four caps for the Norwegian national team.

Following his retirement from playing, Møller was the head coach of Fana IL from 1992 to 1994, Voss in 1999, IL Sandviken from 2005 to 2010, and Avaldsnes IL in 2014. He was the managing director of Sandefjord BK in 1991 and a member of the board at Brann from February 1996 to the summer of 1998, and later the club's sporting director from 2000 to 2002.
