= Svein Mathisen =

Norwegian footballer (1952-2011)

Personal information
- Full name: Svein Erling Mathisen
- Date of birth: 30 September 1952
- Place of birth: Sauda, Norway
- Date of death: 27 January 2011 (aged 58)
- Place of death: Kristiansand, Norway
- Height: 1.80 m (5 ft 11 in)
- Position: Attacking midfielder

Youth career
- IK Start

Senior career*
Years	Team	Apps	(Gls)
1973–1989	IK Start	327	(106)
1978	Hibernian	3	(0)

International career
1975–1984	Norway	25	(2)
- * Club domestic league appearances and goals

Svein Erling "Matta" Mathisen (30 September 1952 – 27 January 2011) was a Norwegian footballer. With the exception of a short spell with Scottish club Hibernian in 1978, "Matta" played for IK Start throughout his career, where he won the Norwegian league title in 1978 and 1980. Mathisen was capped 25 times for Norway, scoring twice.

Playing attacking midfielder or striker, Mathisen played 327 top-tier league matches, and scored 106 goals. Both numbers are club records, and when he retired in 1989 he also held the domestic "matches played" record. It has later been beaten by Ola By Rise, Roar Strand, Christer Basma, Erik Hoftun and Bjørn Johansen.

In 2010, Mathisen was diagnosed with stomach cancer, and began treatment for it, but he continued to play football and appear on television. In an interview with Verdens Gang, Mathisen said the sickness had taught him to love the little things in life, and that he was optimistic about his recovery.

Svein Mathisen died in his sleep from cancer in the early hours of 27 January 2011, nearly six months after being diagnosed. His last public appearance had been at a local football tournament just a few days prior. Several football personalities expressed grief over his death, and his old club IK Start cancelled all activities for the day.

Mathisen's son Jesper is also a footballer, who plays as a central defender or defensive midfielder for IK Start. He is also a former under-21 international for Norway.
