= Ingvar Dalhaug =

Norwegian footballer (born 1957)

Personal information
- Date of birth: 10 July 1957 (age 69)
- Position: Forward

International career
Years	Team	Apps	(Gls)
1983	Norway	1	(0)

Ingvar Dalhaug (born 10 July 1957) is a Norwegian footballer. He played in one match for the Norway national football team in 1983.
