= Torbjørn Svendsen =

Norwegian footballer (born 1954)

Personal information
- Date of birth: 1 June 1954 (age 72)
- Position: Forward

Senior career*
Years	Team	Apps	(Gls)
1973–1986	Viking		

International career
1979	Norway	7	(0)
- * Club domestic league appearances and goals

Torbjørn Svendsen (born 1 June 1954) is a Norwegian former footballer who played as a forward for Viking. He made seven appearances for the Norway national team in 1979.
