= Bjørn Tronstad =

Norwegian footballer (born 1957)

Personal information
- Full name: Bjørn Tronstad
- Date of birth: 11 April 1957 (age 69)
- Place of birth: Bergen, Norway
- Position: Striker

Youth career
- SK Brann

College career
Years	Team	Apps	(Gls)
1979–1981	San Francisco Dons	73	(40)

Senior career*
Years	Team	Apps	(Gls)
1976–1979	Brann	112	(62)
1981	???	4	(1)

International career
1976	Norway	4	(0)
- * Club domestic league appearances and goals

Bjørn Tronstad (born 11 April 1957) is a retired Norwegian football player. Tronstad played at SK Brann from 1974 to 1979. During his 5 years at Brann Tronstad scored a total of 127 goals during 222 matches, and became one of the top-scoring players in the history of the club. Tronstad was looked upon by many as the new Roald 'Kniksen' Jensen. Tronstad retired when he was only 25 years old because he wanted to study in the United States. It is told that he was a major scorer in the local football teams and college teams.

Tronstad had a small comeback in 1981, but he only played 4 games and scored 1 goal.

== Collegiate career ==
Tronstad retired from professional football in 1979 to play college soccer in the United States at the University of San Francisco. While at San Francisco, Tronstad lead the NCAA (U.S. college sports organisation) in scoring during the 1979 season, scoring 29 goals in 26 appearances. Tronstad played three years of collegiate soccer finishing with 40 goals in 73 matches. He is ranked fifth all-time in goals scored for the university.
