= SK Haugar =

Norwegian football club

- Full name: Sportsklubben Haugar
- Nickname: Terrierne
- Founded: 19 October 1939; 86 years ago
- Ground: Sakkestad Idrettspark, Haugesund
- Chairman: John-Steinar Pedersen
- Head coaches: Kent Michael Bøe (Men) and Hellen Cathrine Våge (Ladies)
- League: 2. Divisjon (women); 5. Divisjon (men); Fourth Division / 3, 7th (men)
- Website: haugar.spoortz.no
Home colours	Away colours

Sportsklubben Haugar is an association football club from Haugesund, Norway, established in 1939. Its top women's team plays in the Second Division and the top men's team plays in the Fifth Division.

The men's team has played two Norwegian Football Cup finals, losing 0–7 against Fredrikstad in 1961 and 2–1 against Viking in 1979. This qualified the team for the 1980–81 European Cup Winners' Cup: in the first round, Haugar drew Sion 1–1 away and then beat them 2–0 at home. In the second round, Haugar tied Newport County 0–0 at home, but lost 0–6 away.

The team played their last season in the top division in 1981. In 1993, it merged its elite teams with Djerv 1919 to create FK Haugesund. Haugar continued to compete in lower divisions.

== European record ==
Season	Competition	Round	Club	Home	Away	Aggregate
1980–81	European Cup Winners' Cup	First round	(Switzerland) Sion	2–0	1–1	3–1
1980–81	European Cup Winners' Cup	Second round	(Wales) Newport County	0–0	0–6	0–6

== Honours ==
- Norwegian Cup:
  - Runners-up (2): 1961, 1979
