= Sogndal Fotball =

Sogndal IL's association football section

Sogndal
- Full name: Sogndal Fotball
- Founded: 19 February 1926; 100 years ago
- Ground: Fosshaugane Campus; Sogndal Municipality
- Capacity: 5,622
- Chairman: Tor Arne Ness
- Head coach: Eirik Bakke (interim)
- League: 1. divisjon
- 2026: 1. divisjon, 14th of 16
- Website: www.sogndalfotball.no
Home colours	Away colours

Sogndal Fotball is the football department of Norwegian sports club Sogndal IL from Sogndal Municipality in Vestland. The club was founded in 1926. The men's team currently plays in second tier 1. divisjon of the Norwegian football league system. The club's home matches are played at the 5,622 capacity Fosshaugane Campus.

The men's team contests for the Norwegian Cup. They achieved for the first time play in the 1976 Norwegian Cup final phase. They were unsuccessful in the pursuit of the 1976 Norwegian Cup as runner-up in the 1976 Norwegian Cup, losing to SK Brann 2-1. Sogndal became the first third-tier side to play in a Norwegian Cup final. Sogndal men's team contests in the top division Eliteserien. They contested in the 2017 season.

== History ==
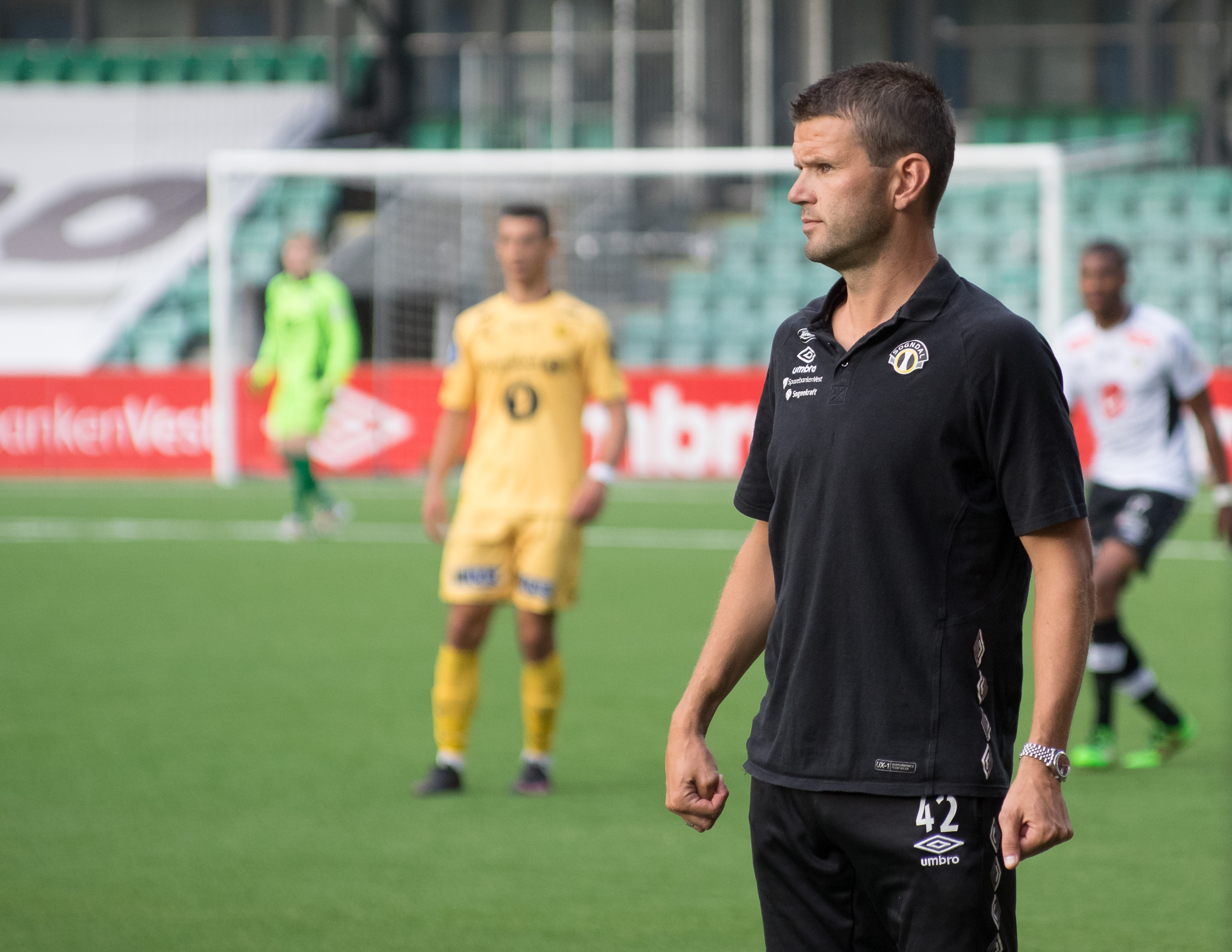
Eirik Bakke had two spells at Sogndal was head coach at the club from 2015 to the 2020–21 season where halfway into the season stated would be the last at his club, ending his 6-year spell as head coach.

Sogndal IL was founded 19 February 1926. They contested their first top division season in 1982, and ended the season in 11th position; relegation returned them to the second tier.The club's breakthrough in Norwegian football came in 1976, when they as a third-tier side they for their first time reached the final of the 1976 Norwegian Cup. Sogndal lost that final to Brann at Ullevaal Stadion 2–1; Knut Christiansen scored Sogndal's only goal.

Sogndal's second season in the first tier 1988 Norwegian First Division, they finished in sixth place, their then best finishing position. The club was relegated to the second tier in the 1989 season. Sogndal won group A in the 1990 2. divisjon and won promotion. During the 1990s, Sogndal played five seasons in the first tier. In 1999, Sogndal received a transfer fee reported to be around NOK 40 million when Eirik Bakke was sold to Leeds United. From 2001 to 2004, Sogndal played four consecutive seasons in the top division, an achievement they repeated in the seasons 2011–14. The men's team were promoted to the 2011 Tippeligaen after winning the 2010 1. divisjon. Sogndal won the 2015 Norwegian First Division, their sixth successive second tier title. They share this distinction with HamKam and Lyn, the only other clubs with six Norwegian second tier titles.

In 2017, Sogndal received relegated an eighth time from Eliteserien, after losing the relegation play-offs on a penalty shoot-out against Ranheim.

== Stadium ==
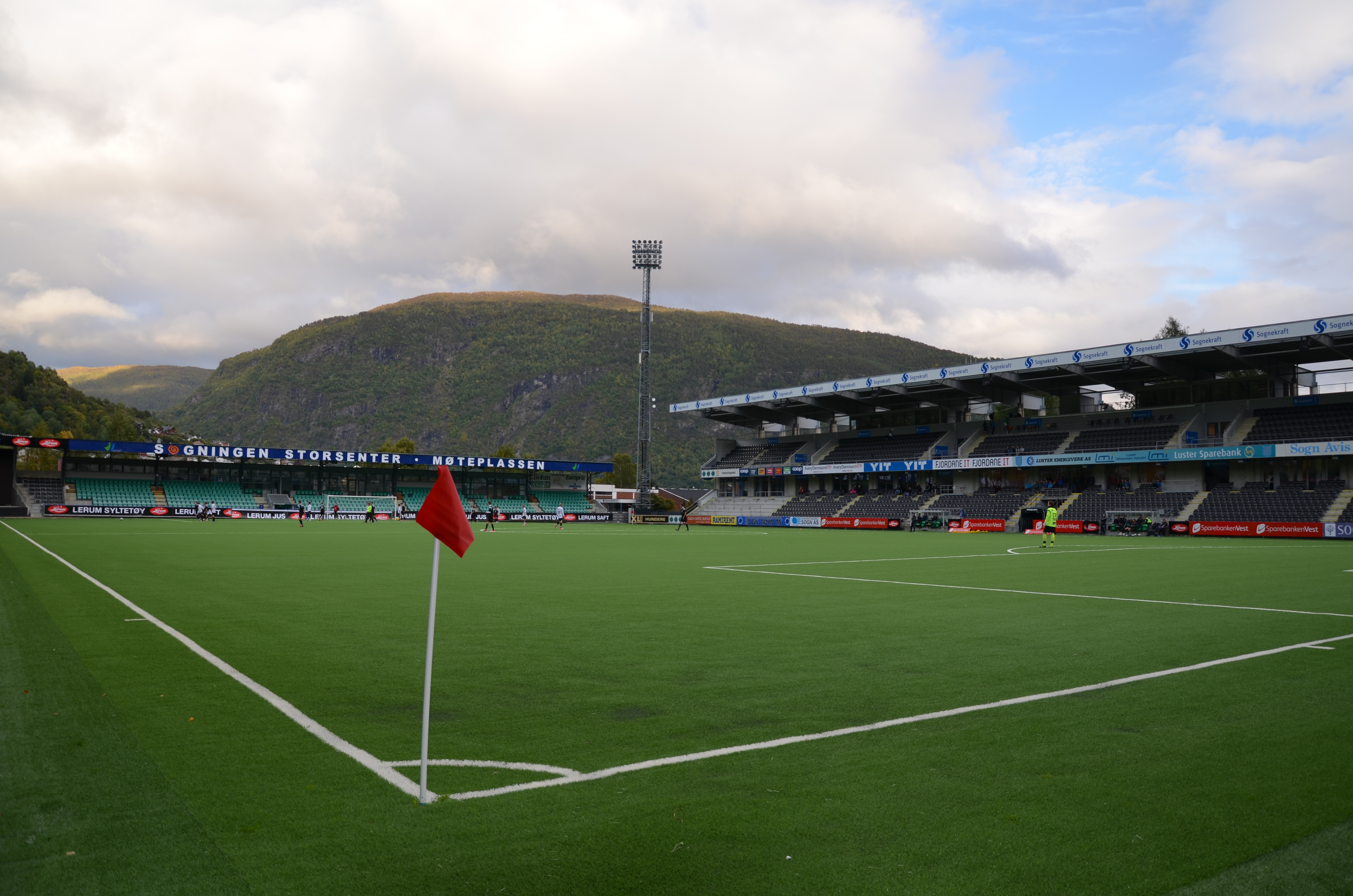
Fosshaugane Campus in September 2012.

The club's stadium is Fosshaugane Campus. The stadium was renovated and reopened in 2006 and the name Campus was added because the local Sogn og Fjordane University College and high school is located in the stadium. The capacity is 5,622.

The attendance record of 7,025 spectators dates from the 1976 Norwegian Cup quarter-final against Start.

== Recent seasons ==
Season		Pos.	Pl.	W	D	L	GS	GA	P	Cup	Notes
2004	Tippeligaen	↓ 14	26	5	7	14	39	57	22	Third round	Relegated to 1. divisjon
2005	1. divisjon	7	30	11	8	11	47	51	41	Third round	
2006	1. divisjon	6	30	11	8	8	43	41	44	Fourth round	
2007	1. divisjon	7	30	13	5	12	48	44	44	First round	
2008	1. divisjon	4	30	15	9	6	53	36	54	Fourth round	
2009	1. divisjon	4	30	14	12	4	46	29	54	Fourth round	
2010	1. divisjon	↑ 1	28	17	5	6	51	28	56	Quarter-final	Promoted to Tippeligaen
2011	Tippeligaen	14	30	8	10	12	24	31	34	Fourth round	
2012	Tippeligaen	12	30	8	10	12	29	37	34	First round	
2013	Tippeligaen	12	30	8	9	13	33	48	33	Fourth round	
2014	Tippeligaen	↓ 15	30	6	6	18	31	49	24	Fourth round	Relegated to 1. divisjon
2015	1. divisjon	↑ 1	30	18	8	4	59	31	62	Third round	Promoted to Tippeligaen
2016	Tippeligaen	11	30	8	12	10	33	37	36	Third round	
2017	Eliteserien	↓ 14	30	8	8	14	38	48	32	Third round	Relegated to 1. divisjon
2018	1. divisjon	4	30	15	6	9	47	31	51	Second round	
2019	1. divisjon	6	30	13	6	11	51	38	45	Third round	
2020	1. divisjon	3	30	15	6	9	57	36	51	Cancelled	
2021	1. divisjon	6	30	11	9	10	40	35	42	Third round	
2022	1. divisjon	7	30	12	7	11	55	53	43	Fourth round	
2023	1. divisjon	7	30	12	7	11	45	45	43	Fourth round	
2024	1. divisjon	13	30	9	7	14	34	40	34	Third round	
2025	1. divisjon	8	30	12	7	11	49	48	43	Third round	
2026	1. divisjon	14	30	8	7	15	48	63	31	First round	

== Achievements ==
- Eliteserien
  - 6th place: 1988
  - 8th place: 2001, 2003
- Norwegian Cup; Runners-up: 1976
- 1. Divisjon / 2. Divisjon (6): 1981, 1987, 1990, 1993, 2010, 2015

== Players ==
=== First-team squad ===
As of 3 September 2026

Note: Flags indicate national team as defined under FIFA eligibility rules; some limited exceptions apply. Players may hold more than one non-FIFA nationality.

No.	Pos.	Nation	Player
1	GK	NOR	Lars Jendal
4	DF	NOR	Even Hovland
5	DF	NOR	Kristoffer Lassen Harrison (on loan from Moss)
6	MF	NOR	Martin Høyland
8	MF	NOR	Lukas Gausdal (on loan from Start)
9	FW	NGR	Kparobo Arierhi (on loan from Lillestrøm)
10	MF	NOR	Kasper Skaanes
11	FW	GHA	Emmanuel Mensah
14	DF	GHA	Jamal Deen Haruna
15	FW	FIN	Onni Helén
16	MF	LAT	Lūkass Vapne
17	FW	POR	Fábio Sturgeon

No.	Pos.	Nation	Player
18	MF	NOR	Vegard Haugerud Hagen
19	MF	FIN	Tuomas Pippola
20	FW	NOR	Preben Asp
23	DF	ISL	Atli Barkarson
24	GK	POL	Kacper Bieszczad
32	DF	NOR	Mathias Øren
35	DF	NOR	Emil Lunde Hillestad
38	GK	NOR	Ard Ragnar Sundal
39	MF	NOR	Elias Flo
88	DF	KEN	Rooney Onyango
—	GK	NOR	Daniel Gjerde Sætren

For season transfers, see List of Norwegian football transfers winter 2024–25, and List of Norwegian football transfers summer 2025.

=== Out on loan ===
Note: Flags indicate national team as defined under FIFA eligibility rules; some limited exceptions apply. Players may hold more than one non-FIFA nationality.

No.	Pos.	Nation	Player
36	MF	NOR	Marius Årøy (at Lysekloster IL until 31 December 2026)

== Coaching and administrative staff ==
Head coach	Eirik Bakke (interim)
Assistant coach	Rune Bolseth
Assistant coach	Marius Lenni Bøe
Goalkeeping coach	Geir Stenehjem
Head of medical/Physical Coach	Didrik Sundsbø
Chairman	Rolf Navarsete
Director	Yngve Hallèn
Director Sport	Anders Giske

== Records ==
- Most appearances: 611, Asle Hillestad
- Most goals: 321, Svein Bakke
- Most goals, Eliteserien: 46, Håvard Flo
- Biggest win, Eliteserien: 5–0 vs. Odd, 15 June 2003
- Biggest defeat, Eliteserien: 0–9 vs. Stabæk, 25 October 2009

== Managerial history ==
- Ingvar Stadheim (1979–80, 1983–84)
- Harald Aabrekk (1990–92)
- Michael Speight (1999–00)
- Torbjørn Glomnes (1 January 2000 – 31 December 2002)
- Jan Halvor Halvorsen (1 January 2003 – 30 November 2004)
- Trond Fylling (2005)
- Stig Nord (2006 – 31 December 2006)
- Karl Oskar Emberland (1 January 2007 – 6 November 2009)
- Harald Aabrekk (1 January 2010 – 31 December 2011)
- Jonas Olsson (1 January 2012 – 31 December 2014)
- Eirik Bakke (1 January 2015 – 31 December 2021)
- Tore André Flo (1 January 2022 – 30 September 2024)
- Morten Kalvenes (1 October 2024 – 31 December 2024)
- Luís Pimenta (1 January 2025 – 7 September 2026)
- Eirik Bakke (caretaker) (26 June 2026 – )

== Controversy ==
In 2025, the CEO of long-time key sponsor Lerum announced a reduction of the company's support, citing communication problems and alleged lack of respect shown by the club.

In June 2026, a letter to the management signed by the first team players was leaked to the local press. In the letter, the players claimed that there had been harassment of Sogndal Fotball's African players. Luis Pimenta, the head coach, who had been hired by Sogndal despite Sportbladet's allegations of bullying and an "alleged reign of terror" during his time at Brommapojkarna, was temporarily suspended by the club, pending an investigation of the claims. The move by the players came as Sogndal's 20 year old goalkeeper warned the local newspaper about his experience of exclusion at the club. Despite being a recent call-up with the Norway national under-21 football team, the player was not featured on the bench, apparently being Sogndal's fifth choice as a goalkeeper. In a formal response, the club claimed that the player had been treated fairly, like any other player. Pimenta was fired by the club in September 2026 and replaced by Eirik Bakke. Pimenta has challenged the club's decision, claiming that he has not discriminated players based on ethnicity, and that the external investigation confirms this.
