= Spaceballs (demogroup) =

Norwegian demogroup

Spaceballs is a Norwegian Amiga demogroup, originally formed in Halden in 1988–1989. The group is particularly known for its demos in the early 1990s, such as Wayfarer, State of the Art and 9 Fingers, which won awards at international demo parties. It is the oldest existing demogroup in Norway.

== History ==
The group was founded by Rune Winsevik, a young computer enthusiast, and named after the 1987 Mel Brooks film Spaceballs. Winsevik used the pseudonym "Dark Helmet", inspired by the villain of the film. The group was soon joined by Lone Starr, Major Asshole, Defender (later President Screw), Yoghurt and Vinnie. Most of the other members also based their nicknames on characters from the film.

Spaceballs began producing and releasing demos in 1990. In June 1991, the group presented one of their first demos, Spasmolytic, at the Amega Party 1991, held in Porsgrunn. The demo finished in 5th place, though it received positive feedback due to the coding by Lone Starr and Major Asshole and the music composed by Vinnie, despite the group not having a graphics artist. In Lone Star's case, people were impressed by his ability to make his own 3D vector graphics engine at a young age, faster than the other older coders. In April 1992, Spaceballs presented Wayfarer at The Gathering in Lillestrøm, which ranked in 1st place and won.

Spaceballs' first breakthrough was State of the Art, released at The Party. The demo, produced between the summer of 1992 and December, made use of graphic effects and footage of dancing women synchronised to techno music, using a trackloader. Lone Starr was inspired by an animation created by Major Asshole with Deluxe Paint to program a genlock overlay tool. Jannicke Selmer-Olsen (b. July 1976) (who was dating Lone Starr at the time) and Anne-Lene Løvig Glomsrød were specially requested since they were entrants to disco dancing competitions at the time. The group created the demo by videotaping the dancers' movements and converting the footage to vector data using Lone Starr's tool, with the footage itself rendered via geometric shapes. They also vectorised dance scenes from music videos by Marky Mark and the Funky Bunch, shown on MTV, and the women from the title sequence of the James Bond film Licence to Kill. In order to fully achieve the effects, the group hacked the Amiga's chipset to use the hardware's processing power. The demo also used memory from an extension port instead of the original Amiga 500. The spot illustrations and graphics were done by TMB Designs. The "loader" song was composed by Vinnie, while the song "Condom Corruption" was composed by Rune Svendsen, who used the pseudonym "Travolta", inspired by his love of disco and John Travolta. Svendsen cited his viewings of MTV's Party Zone, recordings of Essential Mix, 808 State, Orbital, Snap!, The Future Sound of London, and Moby as his influences. "Condom Corruption" was inspired by the "Hoover sound" in "James Brown Is Dead" by L.A. Style. The track was originally longer and was cut down to fit the demo's duration.

Despite ranking 1st place and winning, opinion was split on State of the Art. It was well-received and considered impressive at the time, though other demogroups were jealous of the demo, criticising it for its focus on visuals and usage of techno music, compared to other demos which focused on outperforming each other, and arguing that it did not rely on realtime processing. The demo would attain a cult following in recent years. It only ran on one floppy disk on an Amiga 500, but crashed when running on the Amiga 1000 and Amiga 1200. In 1993, the demo was fixed by Stingray from Skid Row, another demogroup, in order to make it run properly on other Amiga models, during which he added a message at the end about the demo winning, calling its coding "lame" and its trackloader "useless". State of the Art was broadcast on MTV and other television channels, such as France Régions 3 on the program Micro Kid's. Other releases by the group included Mobile: Destination Unknown at The Gathering in April 1993 (3rd place), 9 Fingers at The Party in December 1993 (4th place), and The Last Finger at The Gathering in April 1995 (2nd place), with the group themselves competing with other demogroups. Lone Starr came up with the name for 9 Fingers when he broke one of his fingers during production, and thus had to finish the coding with only nine fingers. The footage of the dancers was recorded by Major Asshole, with each frame digitised and traced using the NewTek DigiView and Lone Starr's program. The demo utilised high-resolution polygons and details on the dancers instead of silhouettes. 9 Fingers ran on two floppy disks and was also popular, although not as much as its predecessor.

As a result of Spaceball's success, other demosceners left their groups to join them, including Danny, Slummy, SuperNao, Facet, and Magnar/Lizard. In April 1993, the group also recruited Lord Helmet, Perplex and Kingpin, the producers of the disk magazine R.A.W, for which they released nine issues. In 1994, Spaceballs and another demogroup, Reality, had plans to organise the demoparty Somewhere in Holland in the Maaspoort in 's-Hertogenbosch, but it was eventually cancelled. In 1995–1997, Spaceballs' early success faded as many members left the group to work at game companies, such as Funcom (on Winter Gold) and Innerloop Studios (on Joint Strike Fighter); Lone Starr, going under his real name Paul Endre Endresen, used his program on Winter Gold to convert real video footage into filtered polygon graphics. During this time, Reality released a parody of 9 Fingers called One Finger at Symposium in April, which ranked in 5th place. Slummy, the group's only remaining coder, quietly released some demos, such as Trip '96, Pinch, FastLoff and The October Session. Following a long period of absence, Yoghurt reorganised the group in early 1997, hiring new members (Zack, Duck-Hunter, Loverbee, Hardfire, Boo, Psalt, Thor, Useless, Wipe) and bringing back some of the old members (Kingpin, Major Asshole, Sator, Scott, Vinnie). Spaceballs ranked in 1st place in the intro and demo categories at many demoparties, including The Gathering with Hippie Machinery and Quakeroo in 1998, Fusion Is No Good For Me and Supermonster in 1999, Hypnopolis in 2000, and BadAss 5000 in 2001; Kindergarden with N2O in 1998, and Remedy with Popjunkie and Deja-Vu with Sci-Fi and BetaMAX in 1999.

In 2007, members Useless and Loverbee formed a synthpop band, Supercraft. Jannicke Selmer-Olsen worked for the Norwegian Design Council, and currently runs Solgård Design with her husband Øivind Solgård-Jensen in Drøbak, working for brands such as Lerum, Kolonihagen, Mesterbakeren and Baxt. As of 2024, the group still remains active to this day.

== Members ==
=== Current members ===
- Yoghurt/Joghurt a.k.a. Tomas Andersen (composer, graphics artist, coder)
- Slummy a.k.a. Remi Johan Pedersen (coder, graphics artist, composer, co-organiser)
- Menace a.k.a. Glenn Lunder (graphics artist, co-organiser, editor)
- Useless a.k.a. Egil Thomas Hansen (composer)
- Boo a.k.a. Ulf Dahl (graphics artist, composer)
- Duck-Hunter a.k.a. Dihn Hai Nguyen (composer)
- tEiS a.k.a. Craig Bynum (composer)
- Loverbee a.k.a. Geir-Arne Johansen (composer)
- Thor a.k.a. Mahavishnu Nisse Borin (graphics artist)
- Zack a.k.a. Arild Ravlosve (graphics artist)
- Hardfire a.k.a. Johan Roirand (composer, graphics artist)
- lug00ber a.k.a. Ola Christian Gundelsby (composer)
- Exocet a.k.a. Hervé Piton (graphics artist)
- Dominei a.k.a. Reid Hauke Tønnesen (composer)

=== Former members ===
- Dark Helmet a.k.a. Rune Winsevik (founder, graphics artist, coder)
- Lone Starr a.k.a. Paul Endre Endresen (graphics artist, coder, editor)
- Major Asshole a.k.a. Sverre Rekvin (coder, graphics artist)
- Defender/President Screw a.k.a. Andre Hubert Johansen (coder, graphics artist)
- Vinnie a.k.a. Pål Granum (composer)
- Sator a.k.a. Tom Erik Larsen (graphics artist, editor)
- Scott a.k.a. Trond Christer Berg (composer)
- Travolta a.k.a. Rune Svendsen (composer)
- TMB Designs a.k.a. Tore Blystad (graphics artist)
- Danny a.k.a. Danny Geursten (graphics artist)

== Selected productions ==
- Spasmolytic (5th at The Amega Party, June 1991)
- Wayfarer (winner of The Gathering, April 1992)
- State of the Art (winner of The Party, December 1992)
- Mobile: Destination Unknown (3rd at The Gathering, April 1993)
- 9 Fingers (4th at The Party, December 1993)
- The Last Finger (2nd at The Gathering, April 1995)
- Hippie Machinery (winner of The Gathering, April 1998)
- Hypnopolis (winner of The Gathering, April 2000)
- King of Fuck (2nd at Assembly, August 2001)
