= Lillestrøm (town) =

- Town
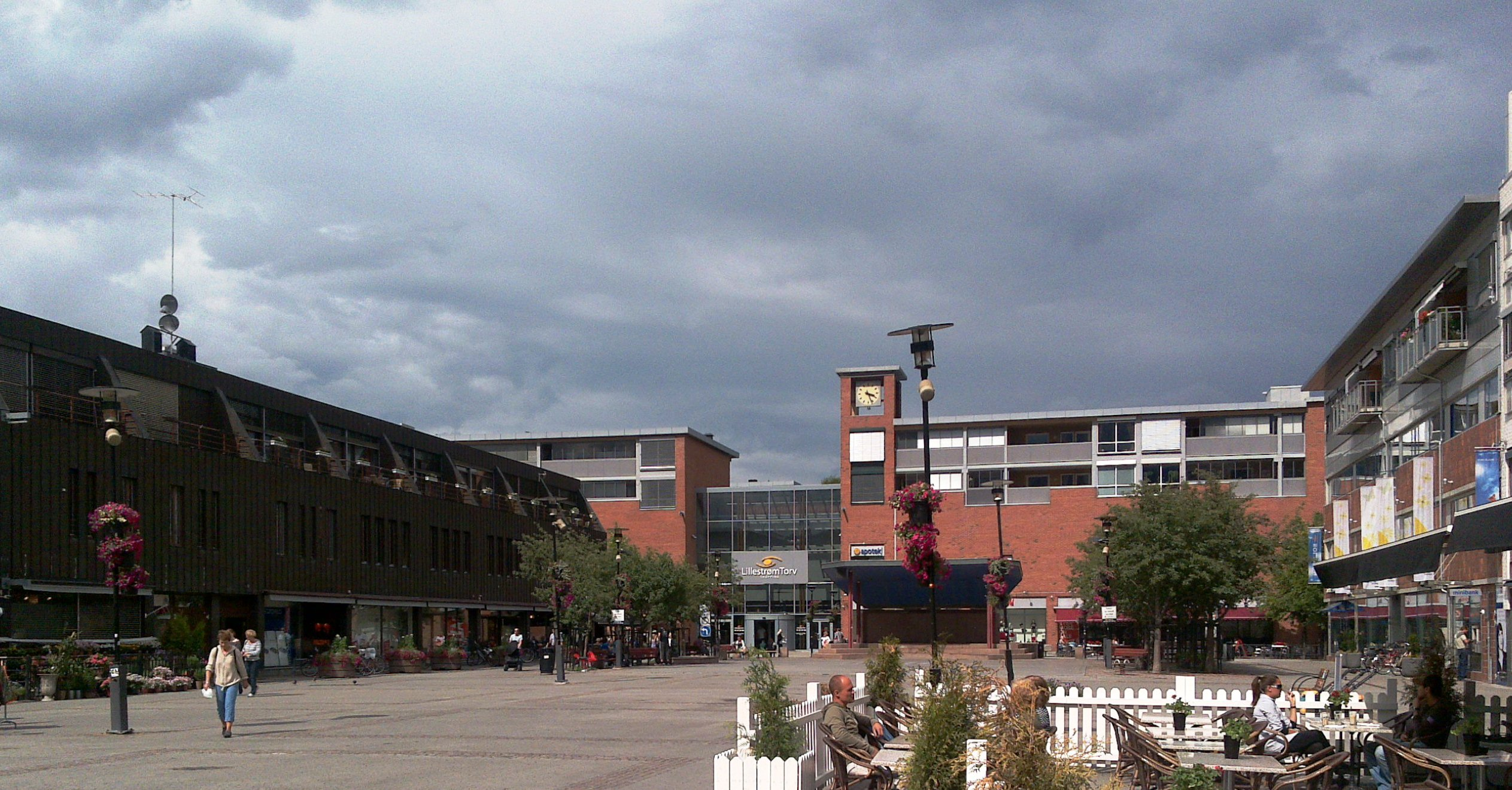
- Square in central Lillestrøm

- Location within Norway
- Coordinates: 59°57′N 11°05′E
- Country: Norway
- County: Akershus
- District: Romerike
- Municipality: Lillestrøm
- Elevation: 109 m (358 ft)
- Time zone: UTC+1 (CET)
  - Summer (DST): UTC+2 (CEST)
- Postal code: 2000-2004

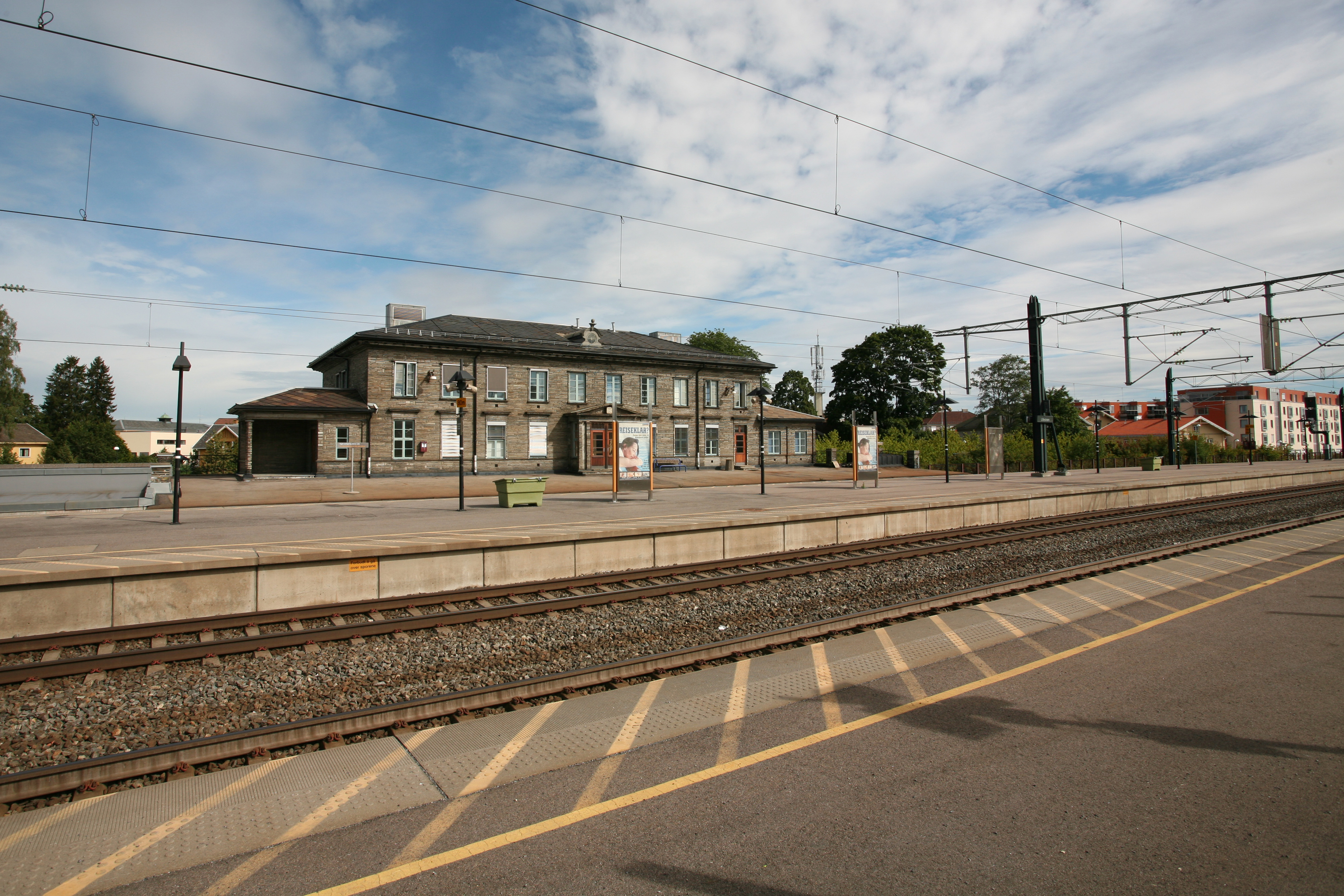
Lillestrøm railway station

Lillestrøm is a town located some 18 km (11 mi) east-northeast of Oslo, the capital city of Norway. With a population of 14,379 inhabitants (18,805 including Kjeller), it is the administrative centre of Lillestrøm Municipality in Akershus County, and lies within the traditional district of Romerike.

== Etymology ==
The name means "the little [part of] Strøm", Strøm being the name of an old and large farm (Old Norse: straumr, which also meant "stream" as well).

== History ==
Lillestrøm's history dates back to the times river powered sawmills came into use for the production of building materials. Later Lillestrøm got its own steam sawmill which laid the base for the development of the area that became the town. The area was, by and large, a moss covered swamp-like area, at the time considered almost uninhabitable. However, the almost non-existent property values were judged to be a fair exchange and so the workers started living and settling in the area around the sawmill, and Lillestrøm was born.

On 1 January 1908 Lillestrøm became a municipality of its own, having been split from Skedsmo. At that time Lillestrøm municipality had a population of 4,351. On 1 January 1962 the two municipalities were reunited under the name Skedsmo. Before the merger Lillestrøm municipality had a population of 10,840.

In 1997, Skedsmo municipal council declared Lillestrøm to be a town (by) in its own right (an honorary status which has no effect upon the organization of local government). The event is commemorated annually with a 4-day street fair.

In 2020, Skedsmo was merged with the neighbouring municipalities Sørum and Fet to form a new municipality named Lillestrøm.

== Transport ==
=== Road ===
Norwegian national road 159 is a four-lane motorway connecting central Lillestrøm and Oslo. The E6 motorway bypasses Lillestrøm a few kilometres to the west on its way from Oslo to the north of the country. National road 22, running from northwest to southeast, passes through the north of the town.

=== Rail ===
Lillestrøm is connected to Oslo by three separate railway lines. The Trunk Line (opened 1854) running south to Oslo via the Grorud valley is used mostly by commuter and freight trains, while the northern part of the line carries frequent local passenger trains as far as Dal as well as freight trains to Eidsvoll, Lillehammer, and Trondheim. Non-stop commuter, airport express, and long-distance express trains use the high-speed Gardermoen Line (opened 1999), which runs mostly through tunnels from Oslo to Lillestrøm, is used by airport express trains, regional trains to Eidsvoll and Lillehammer, and long-distance passenger services to Trondheim to the north. The Kongsvinger Line (opened 1862), running northeast from Lillestrøm conveys hourly local trains to Kongsvinger as well as a number of longer-distance passenger and freight trains to and from Sweden.

=== Air ===
Kjeller, a town contiguous with the north of Lillestrøm, is the site of Kjeller Airfield, which has a long history of both military and civilian use. Founded in 1912, it is one of the world's oldest airports. Today, the airfield is used mainly by light aircraft, and major air traffic is routed to the international airport at Gardermoen (opened 1998). In November 2016, the Norwegian government decided that they would close the airfield by 2023 and plans to redevelop the land for housing and small businesses.

== Education ==
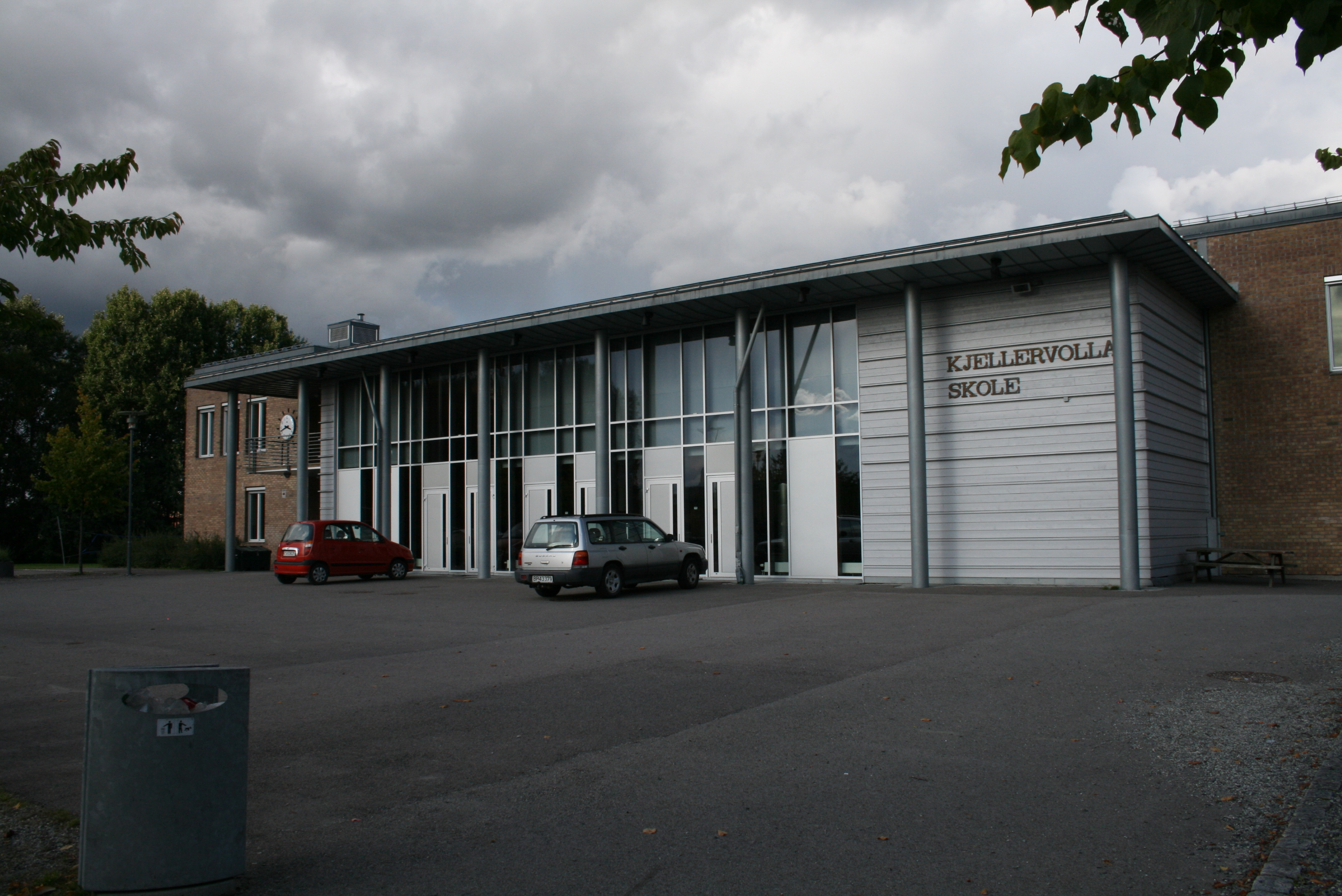
Kjellervolla lower secondary school

Lillestrøm is home to three primary schools (Vigernes, Volla and Kjeller), a lower secondary school (Kjellervolla), and two upper secondary schools (Lillestrøm and Skedsmo). The town also hosts a Folkeuniversitet campus, the Norwegian Correctional Service's college and a satellite campus of Oslo Metropolitan University.

== Government ==
The municipality in Lillestrøm is controlled by the local Labor party. Since 2011, Ole Jacob Flæten has been Lillestrøm's mayor.

The head office of Accident Investigation Board Norway is located in Lillestrøm.

== Sport ==
The local football club, Lillestrøm SK was founded in 1917 and currently plays in the Norwegian first division. The club is among the most successful in Norwegian football and has won five league titles in addition to six cups. During the 70s, the club went through the divisions with back-to-back promotions before eventually winning the double in 1977, largely thanks to their legendary player Tom Lund. Their home ground is Åråsen Stadion which accommodates 10,540 spectators.

- League champion:
  - Winners (5): 1958–59, 1976, 1977, 1986, 1989
  - Runners-up (8): 1959–60, 1978, 1983, 1985, 1988, 1994, 1996, 2001
- Norwegian Cup:
  - Winners (6): 1977, 1978, 1981, 1985, 2007, 2017
  - Runners-up (8): 1953, 1955, 1958, 1980, 1986, 1992, 2005, 2022
- Royal League:
  - Runners-up (1): 2005-06

The nearby Lillestrøm stadion is used for training, and was an ice hockey venue at the 1952 Winter Olympics. There are also two indoor arenas, one multi-purpose (Skedsmohallen) and one for football (LSK-Hallen), and in 2007 a track and field stadium Romerike Friidrettsstadion was built as a cooperation between the municipalities Skedsmo, Rælingen and Lørenskog.

The local track and field club is named Minerva. Athletes such as Hanne Haugland and Håkon Särnblom have represented the club.

Rugby league is represented by newly formed rugby league club Lillestrøm Lions RLK, who are Scandinavia's first ever rugby league club.

== Notable people associated with Lillestrøm ==
- Arild Andersen (1945–), jazz musician
- Pål Steffen Andresen (1982–), footballer
- Peder Borgen (1928–), theologian
- Sasha Gabor (1945–2008), actor
- Fredrik Gulbrandsen (1992–), footballer
- Chris Holsten (1993–), singer, songwriter
- Anne Holt (Larvik 1958–), crimewriter, politician
- Carl Fredrik Lowzow (Oslo 1992–2009), politician
- Jan Mangerud (Oslo 1937–), geologist
- Bjarne Andre Myklebust (1972–), media professional
- Bjørn Nyland (1962–), speed skater
- Thomas Skoglund (1993–), handball player
- Kjell Sørensen (1930–), sports shooter
- Kay Stenshjemmet (1953–), speed skater

== Culture ==
Nitja Center of contemporary Art is located in Lillestrøm.
