= The Gathering (LAN party) =

Annual computer party in Norway

The Gathering 2006 Logo

The Gathering (abbreviated as "TG" for short) is a computer party which is held annually in Vikingskipet Olympic Arena in Hamar, Norway, and lasts for five consecutive days (starting on the Wednesday in Easter each year). Each year, TG attracts more than 5200 (mostly young) people, with attendance increasing every year.

== History ==
=== Beginning ===
In early 1991, Vegard Skjefstad and Trond Michelsen, members of the demogroup Deadline, decided that they wanted to organize a big demoparty in Norway. In the late 1980s and early 1990s, it was common that demoparties (more commonly called "copyparties" at this time) were organized by large demogroups. Because of this, and the fact that Deadline was not particularly well known, Skjefstad suggested that the group Crusaders be involved. At the time, Crusaders was one of Norway's most popular Amiga groups, partly because of their music disks, but also because of their disk magazine, the Eurochart. At first, Crusaders were not too keen on the idea of organizing a party, but when Skjefstad reminded them about the fact that they always complained about the other parties of the same sort, and that this was their chance to show everyone how it should be done, which caused Crusaders to agree.

After briefly considering having the party during the fall of 1991, it was decided that it would be held during Easter. All schools are closed during Easter week (the period from Maundy Thursday to Easter Monday are official holidays in Norway). This meant that most of the target audience would have time off to attend TG, and all organizers and crew could work full-time with TG with a minimum usage of vacation days.

=== 1992–1995 ===
In 1992, 1100 people gathered in Skedsmohallen at Lillestrøm, way more than the expected count of about 800. The following years, TG continued to grow. In 1993, Skedsmohallen again was the venue with 1400 people visiting the party. This was more than the capacity of the venue, making it clear that a bigger venue was required. In 1994 the venue was Rykkinnhallen in Bærum, and the visitor count had risen to 1800 - again more than the venue could hold, which led to intervention by the local fire department who banned indoor sleeping. Consequently, the organizers had to hire a large construction tent and some heavy duty heating equipment (there was still snow on the ground).

No bigger venue could be found, so Skjefstad and Crusaders declined to arrange the party in 1995. A group from Stavanger led by Magnar Harestad proposed to host the party instead, and got approval and some backing from the TG crew. The party was held at Stavanger Ishall, renamed "Gathering 95". However, this caused a sharp drop in attendance, as barely 500 people attended, not even filling the hall to half capacity. This may have been due to moving the event away from the Eastern, more densely populated part of Norway - while the previous events had been held well within one hours drive from the capital of Oslo, Stavanger is over 470 km from Oslo, taking more than 7 hours to drive.

=== 1996-current ===
Meanwhile, the venues built for the 1994 Winter Olympics were made available for hire, and prices were increasingly reasonable due to lack of interest. Amongst these were the Vikingskipet ice skating arena in Hamar, at the time Norway's largest indoor arena - located 1 1/2 hours' drive from central Oslo, and with good infrastructure (power, parking etc.). Skjefstad and Crusaders decided to rent it and have another go, and The Gathering 1996 attracted around 2500 visitors. The organizers then decided to create a separate organization, KANDU (Kreativ Aktiv Norsk Data Ungdom - 'Creative, Active Norwegian Computer Youth') for the specific purpose of running TG every year, and thus promote creativity and computer literacy.

Since then The Gathering continued to grow. By 1998, the maximum capacity of Vikingskipet, of about 5200 attendees, were reached. KANDU have not, however, decided to switch venues again although even larger venues such as the Telenor Arena at Fornebu outside of Oslo are now available. Instead, tickets for the event have sold out increasingly quickly. During The Gathering 2016, a concert of electronic music was performed on stage by Kebu.

The Gathering 2020 was cancelled after recommendations by local health authorities due to the COVID-19 pandemic. Instead, it was to be arranged online under the hashtag TG:Online. The same was done in 2021 and 2022 until in-person events resumed in 2023. However, in January 2024, The Gathering announced via X (formerly Twitter) that the event had been cancelled for 2024, with a promise to release more information in the future. The Gathering was set to return in 2025, following an announcement on X, looking for volunteers.

The Gathering 2025 RE:Start sold out, and set the stage for future events. The attendance at TG25 was lower than previous years, but the response was excellent. After the cancellation of the previous year's TG, KANDU signed a three-year contract with Hamar Olympiske Anlegg (HOA), the organization that manages Vikingskipet.

== Daily life ==
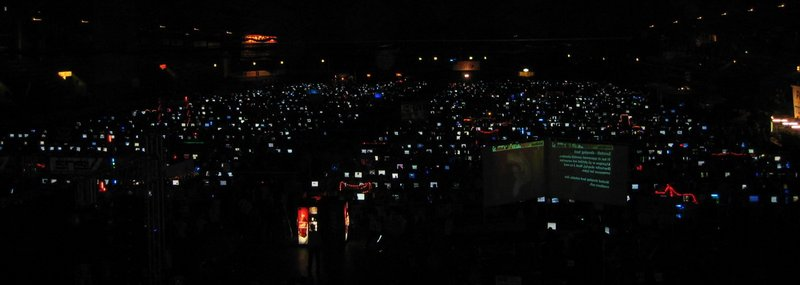
Overview of The Gathering 2005

TG lasts for five days (from Holy Wednesday to Easter Sunday every year), and is both longer and bigger than most other computer parties. Most people tend to let their daily rhythm go and instead sleep as they see fit (many simply in front of their computer, but most people on the arena stands); for a lot of people most of the time is usually spent in front of a computer, but many like to use the opportunity to meet new or old friends in real life.

== Happenings and the demoscene ==
TG has been a hub for young people to compete in events including; demo coding, music, graphics, animation, games, hardware-modification and Dance Dance Revolution to name a few; in addition, there are concerts and other things happening live on stage once or twice a day, as well as seminars etc.

In the first years, the focus on TG was pretty much on demos, but as TG is held at the same time as Breakpoint, a German scene-only party (and the earlier Mekka & Symposium), many European demosceners have left TG in favour of BP, and TG, like the majority of other computer parties, has become more of a gamer event. The scene at TG still lives on, though, as TG has introduced features such as a demoscene-only area, "creative cashback" (those handing in entries to the creative competitions get a discount) and other demo-oriented events. In fact, you have to go back as far as 1996 to match the number of entries handed in to the creative competitions at TG04.

== Crew ==
The organization Kreativ Aktiv Norsk Dataungdom (KANDU) is formally responsible for hosting TG. In addition, there are around 500 volunteers participating to make TG possible every year; these are collectively called the crew.

The TG crew is split into multiple sub-crews, such as a democrew (Event:Demo), a gamecrew (Event:Game), a first-aid crew (Security:Medic), a network crew (Tech:Net), a server crew (Tech:Server), as well as a logistics crew (Core:Logistikk) etc.. (The exact list varies somewhat from year to year.) Each of these has a chief who reports upwards, and is responsible for some aspect of the party.

All crew members are volunteers and unpaid; the only advantages a crew member has over a normal visitor are free entrance, access to a crew-only sleeping room and hot food served a few times a day. All members of the crew must arrive at the party place one day before the party itself starts, and stay one day after the party to aid in cleaning up afterwards. (Some people, such as chiefs, typically come even sooner.)

Everybody who wants can become crew (except for the Security and logistics crews, where there is a minimum age of 18), by applying at a special interface called wannabe. The chiefs usually pick their own crew, based on the applications coming in and previous experience. Crew members from earlier years must re-apply every year if they want to be crew again, but it is rare for a person having done a good job not to be selected the next year.

== Ticket sale controversy ==
Up to and including TG01, TG tickets (as all other tickets to everything else happening in Vikingskipet) were sold by Billettservice, a company closely related to the postal service in Norway. Partly sold via the Internet, partly by phone (but always picked up at a local post office), the Billettservice system broke down hard every year as thousands of people tried to order tickets to the event simultaneously.

To try to make the ticket sales a bit more smooth, a group of people closely related to the administration of TG made a separate company called Partyticket (or Partyticket.net, PTN for short), selling unified ticket-related services (such as ordering, payment, seating, handling competitions etc.) to smaller and larger computer parties. Partyticket went online for the first time in 2002, and like Billettservice instantly went down under the massive load, partly due to a problem at the third-party service authorizing credit card transactions. However, the tickets were still sold out in a matter of hours.

2003 was not much better; a lot of problems had been fixed (and PTN had successfully managed the ticket sales for several other computer parties), but there were still problems left, and it was decided to postpone the ticket sales by one day to fix the problems that had been discovered. The sales went relatively smooth the next day.

In 2004, one hoped that one would finally see the end of the problems, especially as a new queuing system and new hardware was installed; however, the server again buckled under the enormous load, and the queueing system was found to be severely buggy, apparently shuffling people around in the queue at random. This frustrated a lot of visitors, many of which never got tickets at all. Many people blame the ticket-sales problems directly at PTN and has tried to pressure TG into choosing some other solution.

In 2005 the queuing system was changed. Instead of buying actual tickets, people were put in a virtual queue, thus loading the server a lot less during the peak hours. The next day, people were processed from the start of the queue (but no more than 200 at a time). This system ended up working a lot better than the queueing system from 2004, despite some misconceptions in the media. Since 2006, however, there have been no major issues.

In 2007 the Norwegian Tax Authority demanded that taxes were to be paid for the tickets sold from 2001 to 2008, as it did not consider The Gathering to be a cultural event (all cultural events in Norway are exempt from paying taxes). Although the management of TG sent a complaint to the Tax Authority, it did not reconsider the demands. By August 8, the management of TG was required to pay 988,536 NOK in unpaid taxes, which could have caused the 2009 staging of The Gathering to be cancelled. If no money was paid by the August 8 deadline, the event could have been closed for good. However, on August 16, 2008, KANDU and The Gathering won the tax case and will temporarily be exempted from paying taxes for the tickets sold in 2006, 2007, 2008 and the future. Also, the law will be amended to secure this for all other computer parties in Norway. The stated reason for this decision is that The Gathering's purpose is to gather youth from inland and abroad so these can get together to cultivate a computer culture, and the Storting has declared in a white paper that computer gaming is considered culture.

For The Gathering 2011 KANDU has signed an agreement for ticket sales with a company called Unicornis and their ticket system Geekevents. This agreement was for a three years period.

KANDU has signed a new contract with Geekevents AS, for a four-year period.

== Name ==
Most years, TG has a name or "tagline"; the tagline doesn't really mean much, but it still influences the logo (or the other way round) and some other material. A list of names includes:

Year	Tagline	Inspiration
2000	"The Gathering 1900 - Follow the Flow"	The Millennium bug
2001	"A Cyberspace Odyssey"	The movie 2001: A Space Odyssey
2003	"The Gathering: Reloaded"	The movie The Matrix Reloaded, and a reference to the endless reloading to get a ticket on PTN
2004	"Rescue of Fractalus"	The Lucasfilm Games's game Rescue on Fractalus!
2005	"We Are The Robots"	The Kraftwerk song "The Robots" from the album The Man-Machine
2006	"The Dark Side of Pluto"	NASA's first probe to Pluto
2007	"Still Puzzled?"	The famous "fifteen puzzle"
2008	"Optimus Prime"	The Transformers character Optimus Prime, the fact that this is the 17th Gathering (a prime number) and Prime numbers' relations to computers.
2009	"Fire and Ice"	As if making its way through "fire and ice" due to the tax issues, the event still managed to pull off.
2010	"Submerged"	After having seen "Vikingskipet" dressed in fire and ice last year, we dive under water for TG10 and present The Gathering 2010 - Submerged.
2011	"Partly Cloudy with a Chance of Lightning"	The theme points to both that we have now risen from the depths (TG10 - Submerged), and that "cloud computing" is becoming increasingly important in the world of computers.
2012	“At the End of the Universe"	Douglas Adams' The Hitchhiker's Guide to the Galaxy (With e.g. a sperm whale hanging from the ceiling, and a restaurant called Milliways.)
2013	"Singularity"	The technological Singularity. Simon McCallum at TG12.
2014	"Transylvania"	After the Movie Hotel Transylvania
2015	"The Future is Back"	After the movie Back to the Future, released 30 years earlier.
2016	"Switched On"	Binary, the base of how computers work. On or off, also known as bit.
2017	"#Secrets"	Surveillance, hacking and cyber security.
2018	"Social Reality"	Social media and its effects.
2019	"Eve"	The AI known as "Eve" is trying to bring Humans and AI closer
2023	"Gaia"	"Eve"'s darker agenda is set aplay
2024	"Generations"	In honour of the generations of gamers that has attended The Gathering. (Event cancelled)
2025	"RE:Start"	
2026	"RE:Union"	Celebrating 30 years of The Gathering in Vikingskipet.

== Demo and intro competition winners ==
The Gathering demo/intro compo winners, 1992–2011
Year	Platform	Demo	40-64k intro
1992	Amiga	Wayfarer (Spaceballs)	N/A
1993	Amiga	Desert Dream (Kefrens)	40k Intro (Lemon.)
1993	PC	The Search For The Holy Halibut (Twilight Zone)	N/A
1994	Amiga	Sequential (Andromeda)	Bjarne (Stone Arts)
1994	PC	Superunknown (Five And Then Some)	Das Grelle (Gollum)
1995	Amiga	Deep (CNCD & Parallax)	Jobbo TG'95 Intro (Spaceballs)
1995	PC	Dope (Complex)	Fluid Motion (Valhalla)
1996	Amiga	Tint (The Black Lotus)	Lights (Stellar)
1996	PC	Inside (CNCD)	You Am I, You Am The Robot (Orange)
1997	Amiga	Captured Dreams (The Black Lotus)	Gene (Fudge)
1997	PC	CNCD Vs. Orange (CNCD & Orange)	Gene (Fudge)
1998	Amiga	Rise (TRSi)	Imitation None (The Black Lotus)
1998	PC	Non-3D: Dimension (Gods)	Jive 2 (Sublogic)
1998	PC	3D: Planet Cornball (Complex)	Jive 2 (Sublogic)
1999	Amiga	Supermonster (Spaceballs)	Fusion Is No Good For Me (Spaceballs)
1999	PC	Yume 2000 (Future World Mix) (INF)	Public Demand (Purple)
2000	Combined	Hypnopolis (Spaceballs)	glAss (Psikorp)
2001	Amiga	Powergod (Spaceballs)	mx.9kru (Nocturnal)
2001	PC	Triple Five Tsunami (Fadeout)	mx.9kru (Nocturnal)
2002	Amiga	Scrimm (Spaceballs)	Masse Lego (Nocturnal)
2002	PC	Thermo Plastique (INF)	Masse Lego (Nocturnal)
2003	Combined	World Domination (Odd)	LOL 2K (Neon & Lug00ber)
2004	Combined	Our Demo (Outracks)	Nemesis (Excess & Kvasigen)
2005	Combined	Meet The Biots (Portal Process)	Cubism 2 (Kvasigen)
2006	Combined	Animal Attraction (ASD)	Smoke This (Portal Posse)
2007	Combined	Gamma (Outracks)	Mupé (PlayPsyCo)
2008	Combined	Camden Town (PlayPsyCo vs. Kvasigen)	konami / raze (PlayPsyCo)
2009	Combined	Rupture (Andromeda Software Development)	N/A
2010	Combined	Phon (PlayPsyCo)	Magnus (Youth Uprising)
2011	Combined	We Crave Sustenance (PlayPsyCo)	Michigan (Loonies)
2012	Combined	Cortez (Gammel Opland af 1891)	
2013	Combined	Mathog (PlayPsyCo)	
2014	Combined	Nu (Elix)	
2015	Combined	Underworld (Rootkids & Krillbite)	
2016	Combined		
2017	Combined	Proximity (Beginnings)	
2018	Combined	Qb (Pinillya)	
2019	Combined	Rainbow Butterfly (Ida aka. Pinillya)	
2020	Combined		
2021	Combined	This last year has been... (Oklien)	
2022	Combined	Journey (Espen Sande-Larsen)	
2023	Combined	eScape (Dr.CiRCUiT)	
2025	Combined	Mother Loving Indigo (Indigo Demo Edition)	
2026	Combined	Singularity (Dr.CiRCUiT)	
