= Anette Carnarius Elseth =

Norwegian politician (born 1973)

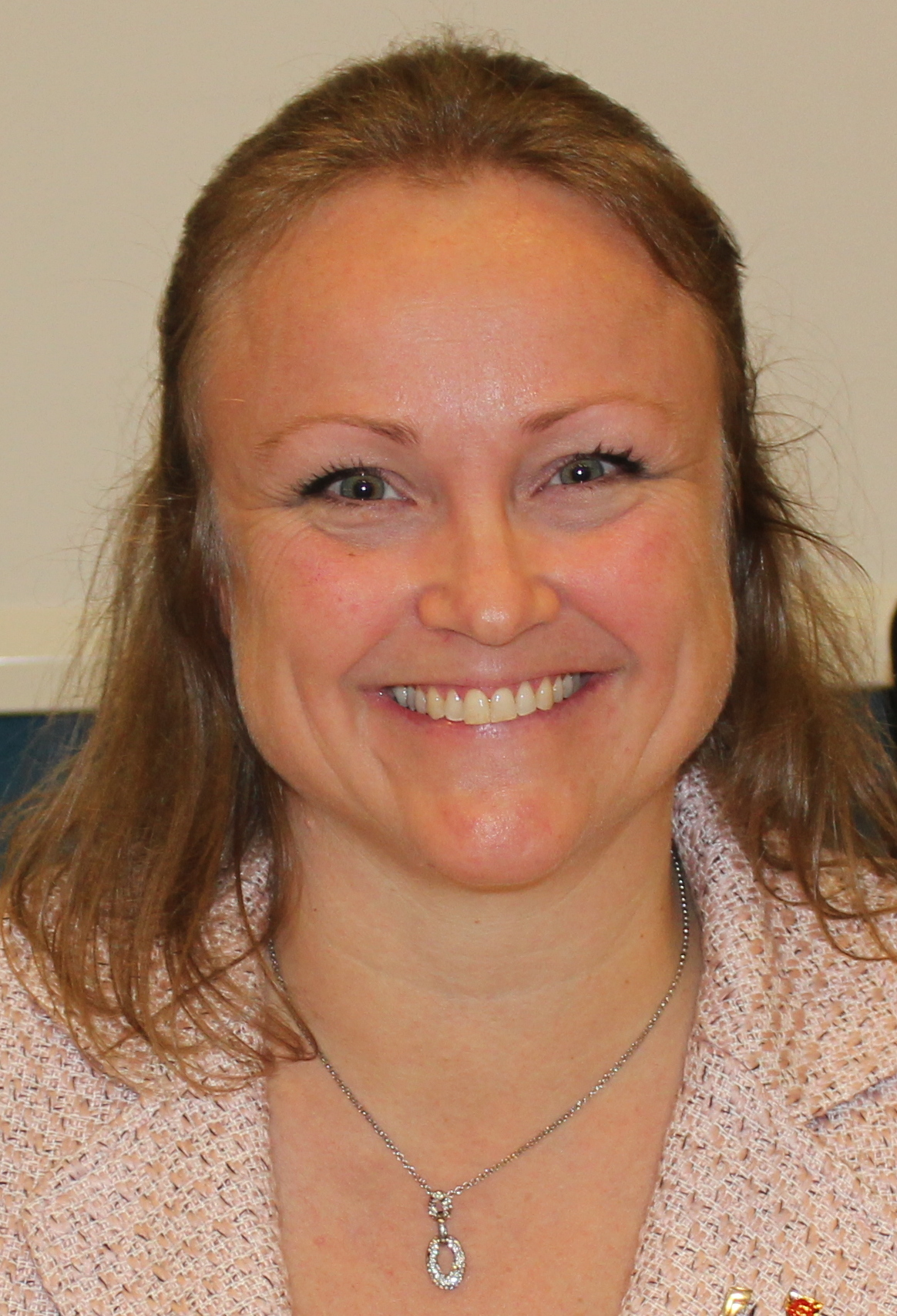

Member of the Storting
- Incumbent
- Assumed office 1 October 2025
- Constituency: Akershus

Deputy Mayor of Lillestrøm
- In office 12 October 2023 – 8 October 2025
- Mayor: Kjartan Berland (H)
- Preceded by: Thor Grosås (Sp)
- Succeeded by: Brede Andreas Rørhus (FrP)

Deputy Mayor of Sørum
- In office 14 October 2015 – 31 December 2019
- Mayor: Marianne Grimstad Hansen (H)
- Preceded by: Ivar Egeberg (Sp)
- Succeeded by: none (Sørum merged into Lillestrøm)

Personal details
- Born: 30 July 1973 (age 52)
- Party: Progress

Anette Carnarius Elseth (born 30 July 1973) is a Norwegian politician from the Progress Party (FrP).

== Career ==
Elseth was a police chief who worked as a political advisor to Minister of Justice and Public Security Anders Anundsen. She was also deputy mayor of Sørum from 2015 to 2019 (when Sørum, Fet and Skedsmo municipalities was merged into the new Lillestrøm municipality). She was also deputy mayor of Lillestrøm from 2023 and until she got elected to the Storting in the 2025 Norwegian parliamentary election.
