= Kebu =

Kebu may refer to:

- Kebu language, also known as Akebu, one of the Ghana–Togo Mountain languages spoken by the Akebu people of southern Togo and southeastern Ghana
- Kebu Stewart, American retired basketball player
- Kebu, Finnish alternative name for kebab (both are used)
- Kebu (musician) (Sebastian Teir), Finnish composer and musician
