= Joint Strike Fighter (disambiguation) =

Joint Strike Fighter may refer to one of the following:

- F-35 Lightning II, a fighter aircraft under development by Lockheed Martin for the militaries of the US and several other nations
  - Lockheed Martin F-35 Lightning II procurement
- Joint Strike Fighter program, the U.S. Department of Defense contract competition that resulted in the F-35's selection
- Joint Strike Fighter (video game), a computer game portraying aircraft from the competition
