= Spaceball =

Spaceball(s) or variation, may refer to:

== TV and film ==
- "Spaceball" (Galactica 1980), a 1980 television episode
- Spaceballs, a 1987 science fiction spoof film directed by and starring Mel Brooks
- Spaceballs: The Animated Series, an animated television spin-off of the 1987 film
- Spaceballs: The New One, a 2027 sequel to the 1987 film

== Music ==
- Spaceball (album), a 1976 album by Larry Young

== Other uses ==
- space ball, a carefully weighted ball used in skydiving
- space-ball, a 3-ball
- Spaceball (computing), a 6DOF input device
- Spaceballs (demogroup), a Norwegian Amiga demogroup

== See also ==
- Spaceball Revolution, a game published and developed for the Wii in 2009
