= Sega Extreme Sports =

2000 video game

- Developer: Innerloop Studios
- Publishers: Dreamcast: JP/PAL: Sega; NA: Infogrames; Microsoft Windows: NA: Infogrames; EU: Empire Interactive
- Platforms: Dreamcast, Microsoft Windows
- Release: Dreamcast: EU: October 27, 2000; NA: November 28, 2000; JP: September 6, 2001; Windows: NA: 2001; EU: December 7, 2001
- Genre: Sports
- Modes: Single player Multiplayer

Sega Extreme Sports is a sports game developed by Norwegian video game development company Innerloop Studios. It was released under a variety of names and published by many companies.

The Dreamcast version features a soundtrack licensed from the electronic music label Ninja Tunes and includes tracks from artists such as Amon Tobin, Coldcut, and DJ Food.

== Gameplay ==
In the Dreamcast version, there are six extreme sports including bungee jumping and skysurfing. Players will have the opportunity to skirt down the side of mountain vistas and surf through the air on a snowboard, barrel over rocky trails on an all-terrain vehicle (ATV), hurtle off bridges on a bungee cord, hang glide through canyons and crevices, and race on a mountain bike.

Unlike other multi-sport games, which often has each event as a separate component, Xtreme Sports utilizes multi-event tracks, where players might snowboard down the side of a mountain and then get on an ATV that will take them to a cliff which they will sail off of on a hang-glider. There are 12 different tracks, each having a different order in which the various events take place, some incorporating each of the different sports. These tracks are situated in environments that seek to emulate real-life locations, such as Mount Kilimanjaro, Maui, Scotland, Stryn and the Himalayas.

== Development and release ==
The game was going to be a launch title for the European release of the game for Dreamcast but was delayed. While the title was reported to have also been developed for Nintendo 64, Innerloop Studios CEO Henning Rokling clarified in an interview that a Nintendo 64 version was never planned. He cited the vast large levels as something that was not possible to run on the Nintendo 64's hardware. The game was only ever in development for PC initially, and then Sega Dreamcast. The original publisher of the game was to be Eidos Interactive but didn't work out, and Innerloop Studios were still looking for a publisher for the game. Infogrames chose to publish the game along with other games for Dreamcast. Laddie Ervin commented, "Xtreme Sports is a fly-by-the-seat-of-your-pants virtual thrill-ride [...] Whether a player is hang gliding, snowboarding or bungee jumping, they will feel totally alive -- and totally out of control!" The game had official licenses for the gear worn by the main characters and for the soundtrack of the game. It was to have a list of online options for players to upload and download high scores through a global server. It was also to have ghost riders and bonus tracks and was set for an October 2000 release. The game was released under the name of Xtreme Sports in the United States.

The European version was published by Sega instead of Infogrames and the title was renamed as Sega Extreme Sports, featuring prominent "Sega Sports" branding.

The European PC release was released under the name of Pepsi Max Extreme Sports with Pepsi Max branding and was published by Empire Interactive. Infogrames, Inc. remained as publisher for the US release, which was known as Maximum Sports Extreme.

== Reception ==
Reception

Aggregate score
Aggregator	Score
Metacritic	69/100

Review scores
Publication	Score
AllGame	2.5/5
CNET Gamecenter	6/10
Electronic Gaming Monthly	6.67/10 (Note: In Electronic Gaming Monthly's review of the Dreamcast version, one critic gave it 7/10, and the rest gave it each a score of 6.5/10.)
EP Daily	5.5/10
Famitsu	28/40
Game Informer	7/10
GameRevolution	B−
GameSpot	7/10
GameZone	7/10
IGN	7/10
Next Generation	2/5

The Dreamcast version received "average" reviews according to the review aggregation website Metacritic.

Jon Thompson of AllGame commented, "Xtreme Sports looks good but doesn't play well, a classic example of effort being put into visuals but not enough into the game's heart. When it comes to video games, style is important, but the substance that is paramount when it comes to rating a title. And while Xtreme Sports offers a distinct experience in the way it combines a number of different events into a single track, it doesn't focus enough on the gameplay of the individual sports to make the whole package compelling." Frank Provo of GameSpot noted, "If you're expecting six perfect games wrapped up in one title, you'll only find disappointment. However, if you're in the mood for a game where each event is reasonably well designed and integrated into a greater, meatier whole, then Infogrames' Xtreme Sports should prove satisfying." Jeremy Dunham of IGN stated, "Certainly not the greatest game to ever slide down the pipe, Xtreme Sports is still not without some charm. Yes, it could have been better had a couple of the events been tightened up in the gameplay department, and yeah, it would have made a lot more sense had the characters been more diverse from one another (Is it me, or is EVERYONE five foot nine?), but I guess that's what sequels are for. A party game best set for rental, Innerloop, and Infogrames gives it the old university try!" Evan Shamoon of NextGen stated, "Coulda, shoulda, woulda... didn't. Poor texture swapping, muddy control, and sloppy collision do not a good game make." In Japan, where said console version was ported and published by Sega on September 6, 2001, Famitsu gave it a score of 28 out of 40. GamePro said that the game "probably won't appear on anyone's 'Top 100 Games' list. Still, its combo of exciting action and a fresh approach to racing means everyone should at least rent it, while racing buffs will probably get hooked enough to spring for a purchase." (Note: GamePro gave the Dreamcast version two 4/5 scores for graphics and fun factor, and two 3.5/5 scores for sound and control.)

European reviews were mixed to positive. British magazine Official Dreamcast Magazine gave Sega Extreme Sports 5 out of 10, praising its graphics and challenge but criticising its steep learning curve and considering some of the included sports poorly implemented. French magazine Consoles+ was considerably more positive, awarding the game 89%. The magazine particularly praised its colourful graphics, music and generally accessible controls, while being less impressed by its presentation and longevity.

German magazine MAN!AC gave the game 80 out of 100, praising its visual presentation and computer-controlled opponents while criticising its limited selection of modes and courses. Spanish magazine Revista Oficial Dreamcast awarded the game 8 out of 10, praising the variety offered by its five extreme sports and finding the game entertaining despite uneven elements among the individual disciplines.
