= Spawn installation =

In personal computer games, a spawn installation is an installed copy of a game that may only be used to play in multiplayer mode, or otherwise limits the amount of single-player content accessible to the user. Additionally, some spawn implementations only allow the user to join games hosted by the installer's cd-key. There are several purposes for a spawn installation, including but not limited to creating added value by allowing the owner of the game to experience the multiplayer mode with friends and demonstrating the game to more potential buyers.

A similar concept (for example, in some Command & Conquer games) is the use of multiple game discs. Each disc contains a discrete portion of the game, such as an individual campaign. Sharing a disc with a friend allows both the owner and the friend to experience the full content of each respective disc, but not at the same time. In contrast with spawn installations, the disadvantage to the multiple-disc approach was that the game could only be shared among as many people as there were discs, while spawn installations could be used on any number of systems.

This concept is very similar to the single-card-multiplayer "Download Play" option that some Nintendo DS games offer (such as Super Mario 64 DS). The difference here, however, is that a spawn installation is installed on the system like a normal program, whereas the Nintendo DS only keeps its downloaded copy in memory while it is powered on.

== Games with spawn installation ==
- Carmageddon
- Joint Strike Fighter - Innerloop
- Need for Speed III: Hot Pursuit - Electronic Arts
- Diablo - Blizzard Entertainment
- Diablo II - Blizzard Entertainment
- StarCraft - Blizzard Entertainment
- StarCraft II - Blizzard Entertainment
- Warcraft: Orcs & Humans - Blizzard Entertainment
- Warcraft II: Tides of Darkness - Blizzard Entertainment
- Earth 2150 - Reality Pump
- Total Annihilation - Cavedog Entertainment
- Disciples: Sacred Lands - Strategy First
- Enemy Territory: Quake Wars - id Software
- Halo Custom Edition - Gearbox Software
- Dr. Mario Online Rx - Nintendo
- Age of Empires - Microsoft
- Age of Empires: The Rise of Rome - Microsoft
- Age of Empires II: The Age of Kings - Microsoft
- Age of Empires II: The Conquerors Expansion - Microsoft
- Heroes of Might and Magic II - The 3DO Company
- Heroes of Might and Magic III - The 3DO Company
- Gruntz - Monolith Productions
- Wolfenstein: Youngblood - Bethesda Softworks
