= Madis (musician) =

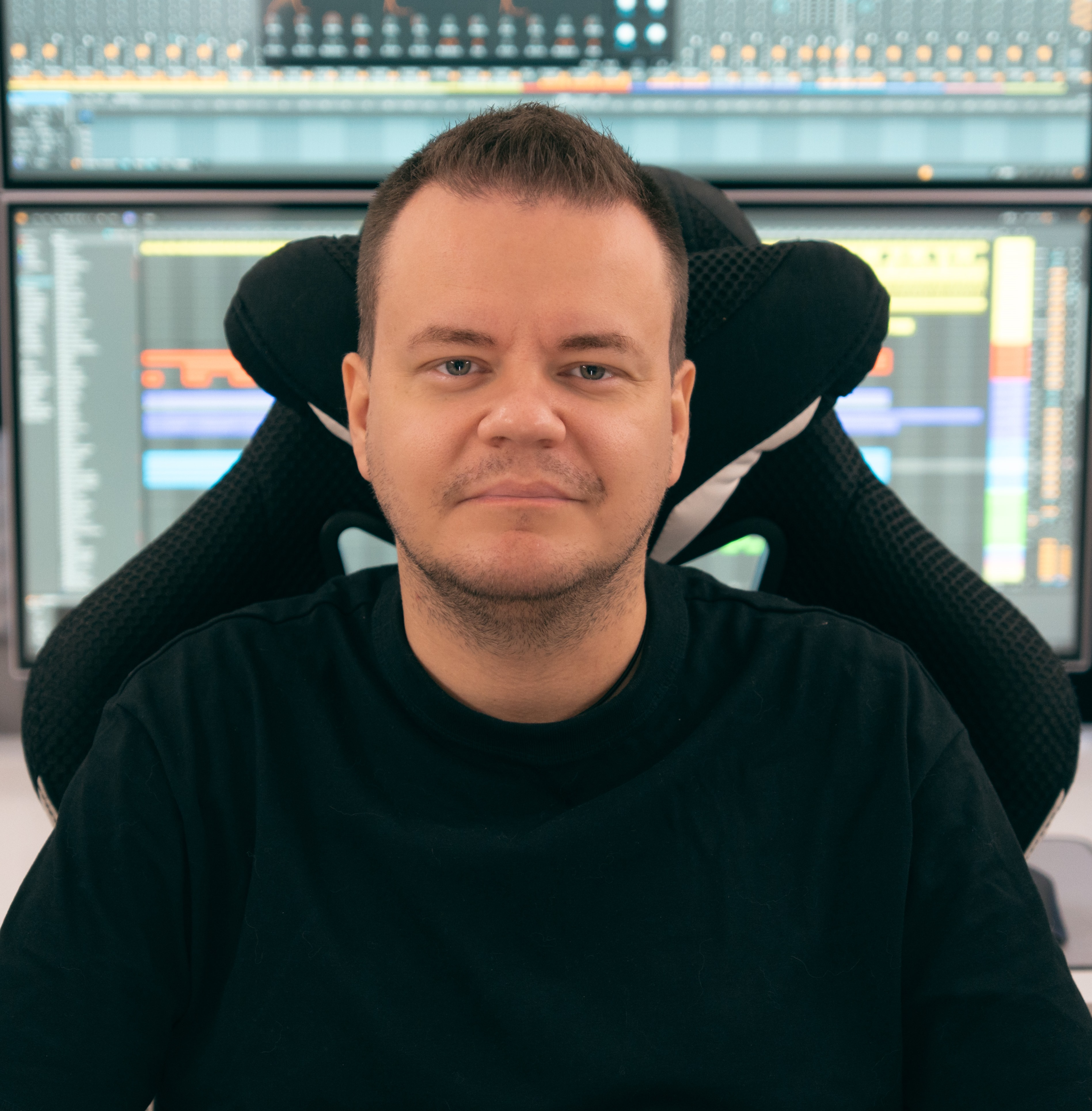

Background information
- Also known as: Madis
- Born: Amadeusz Małkowski; 31 October 1987 (age 38); Kraków
- Origin: Poland
- Genres: electronic music
- Occupations: Composer, music producer
- Instruments: Synthesizer, piano, laser harp
- Years active: 2005–present
- Publisher: Spacebound Music
- Website: www.madis-music.com

Amadeusz Małkowski better known as Madis (born October 31, 1987, in Kraków), is a Polish composer and electronic music producer.

== Career ==
Amadeusz grew up listening to electronic music by artists such as: Jean-Michel Jarre, Tangerine Dream, Klaus Schulze, and Kraftwerk — influences that would later shape his musical path. His first instrument was an electronic keyboard gifted by his parents. Amadeusz left the music school, drawn instead to electronic music. He dreamed of becoming a DJ, which led of residencies in various clubs across Kraków. However, over time, the club scene's mainstream direction began to clash with his artistic vision. DJing no longer fulfilled him, and he started yearning to create his own music. In 2005, 12 years later, DJs began performing in Krakow's music clubs, creating mixes using mashup, a combination of songs from various musical styles, e.g. R’n’B, hip-hop and house with a touch of pop. His first compositions were created in 2013, this work culminated in the release of his debut EP, Ocean Rain. His career gained momentum in 2015 after he remixed Hans Zimmer's Interstellar theme in an electronic trance style. The remix quickly resonated with listeners, amassing over 25 million views on YouTube. Encouraged by this success, he decided to focus on original compositions. In 2019, Madis was inspired by the story of astronaut Mike Collins and wrote a musical piece which he released as a single titled "Carrying the Fire". The track in YouTube garnering over 10 million streams (September 2025)

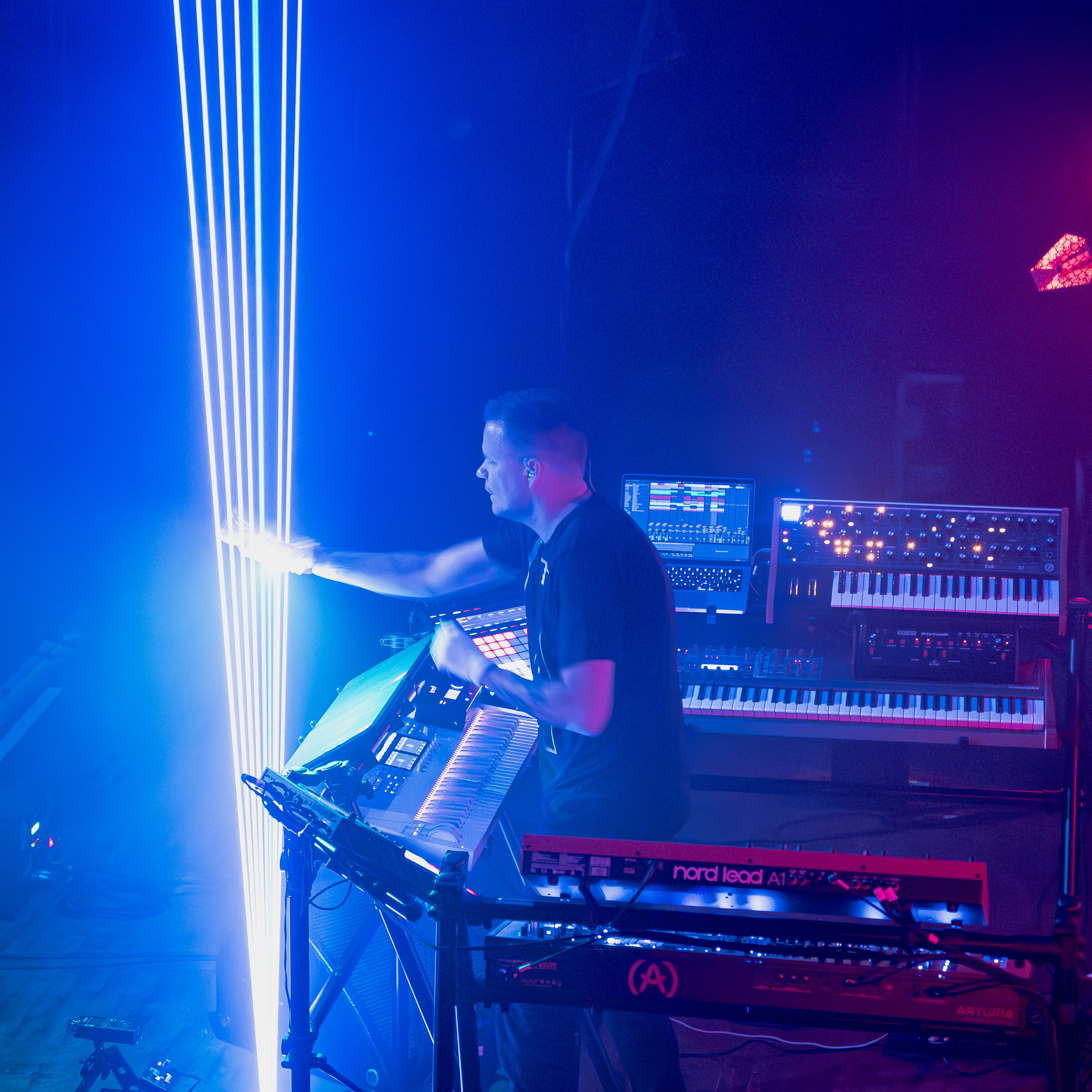
Concert in Warsaw, club "Stodoła"; Madis is playing on laser harp

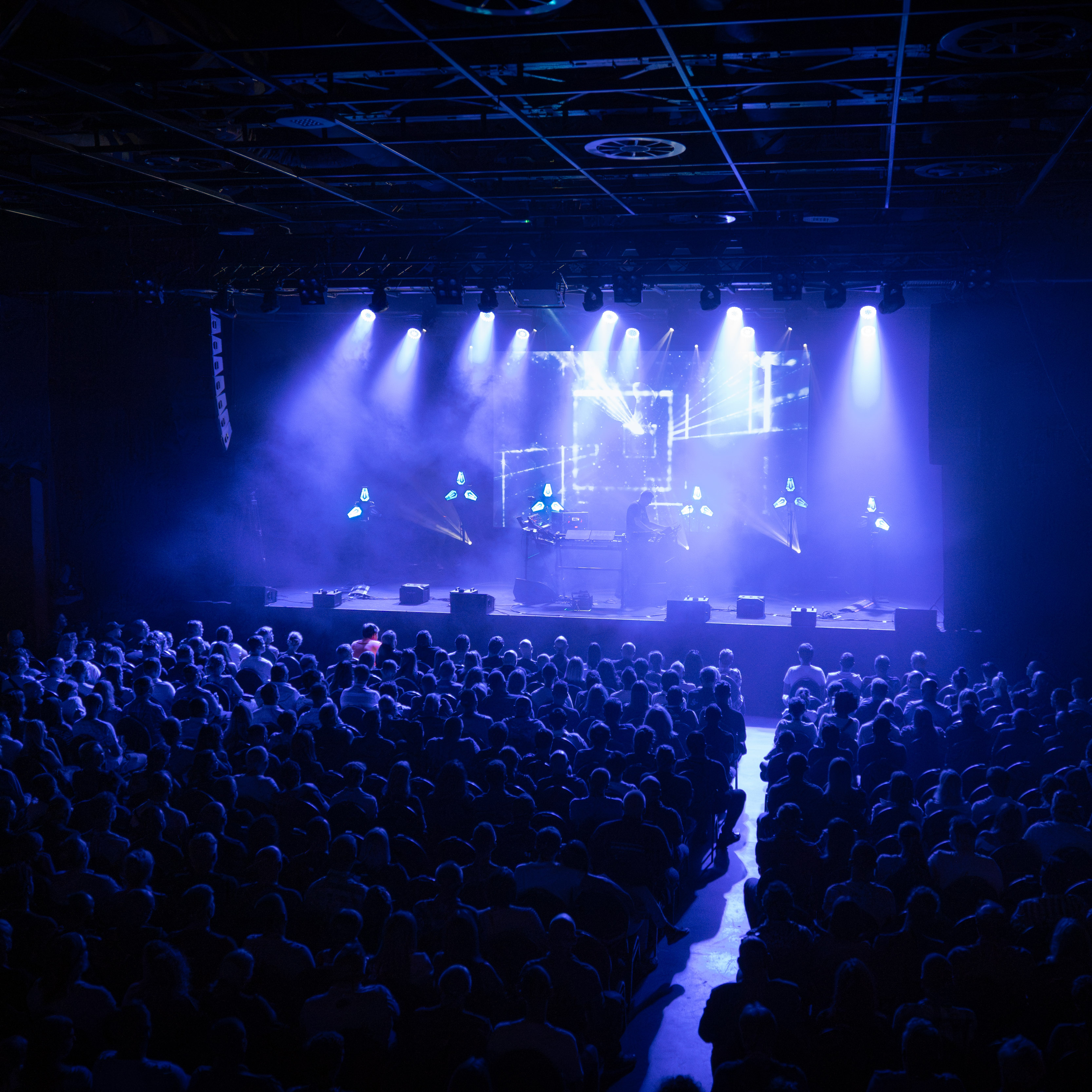
Madis on concert in "Studio" club in Kraków

That same year, he began collaborating with Finnish electronic music artist Kebu, which eventually led to the release of their joint single Mentes Determinadas in June 2025. In March 2025, he released Elements of Life, the final album of the trilogy – though it serves as the first chronologically.

== Discography ==
Source of information

=== Albums ===
- March 27, 2020 – Sea Of Tranquility
- April 29, 2022 – Sail
- August 18, 2023 – Plains of Elysium
- March 28, 2025 – Elements of Life
- October 5, 2025 – Reflecte

=== EPs ===
- 2013 – Ocean Rain EP
- May 1, 2020 – Sea of Tranquility (Ambient Edit)
- September 4, 2020 – Hometown EP

=== Live albums ===
- October 20, 2023 – Live in Krakow

=== Singles (selected) ===
- 2013 – Under The Sea
- March 31, 2018 – Nightwalk
- October 14, 2018 – Desert of Lost Souls
- July 20, 2019 – Carrying the Fire
- August 27, 2020 – Cracow Sunset
- December 4, 2020 – Ironworks
- December 24, 2021 – Sea of Tranquility Part 1 (Re-Vision)
- April 15, 2022 – Siren's Symphony (feat. Kyrah Aylin)
- May 13, 2022 – Meduza
- July 7, 2023 – Mount Olympus
- August 4, 2023 – Redstorm
- September 1, 2023 – Plains of Elysium
- June 28, 2024 – Mount Olympus (Re-Vision)
- July 12, 2024 – Cracow Sunset (Re-Vision)
- December 20, 2024 – Northern Lights
- March 14, 2025 – Deus Solis
- April 18, 2025 – Elements of Life
- June 20, 2025 – Mentes Determinadas (feat. Kebu)
- November 13, 2025 – Distante (with Justyna Bujak and Jacek Królik)
