= I.G.I.-2: Covert Strike =

2003 first-person shooter video game

- Developer: Innerloop Studios
- Publisher: Codemasters
- Director: Stein Pedersen
- Designer: Jolyon Leonard
- Programmer: Morten B. Ofstad
- Artists: Waqas Zia Chaudhry; Kjetil Nystuen
- Writers: Jolyon Leonard; Terje Johansen
- Composer: Kim M. Jensen
- Platform: Microsoft Windows
- Release: PAL: 21 February 2003; NA: 4 March 2003
- Genre: Tactical shooter
- Modes: Single player, Multiplayer

I.G.I.-2: Covert Strike, known in the PAL region as Project I.G.I. 2, is a 2003 tactical shooter video game developed by Innerloop Studios and released by Codemasters. The game is a stealth-based first-person shooter. It is the sequel to Innerloop's Project I.G.I.. The original, published by Eidos Interactive, offered only single-player play, and no game saves. Covert Strike added multiplayer play and limited save game capability. Chris Ryan, a former Special Air Service operative best known for being the lone successful escapee of Bravo Two Zero, served as a consultant to the game.

The game's plot features a rogue Chinese General, "Wu Xing" as the primary antagonist. Xing orchestrates various events (such as armed robbery of advanced prototype technology from the Russian mafia) in order to get electromagnetic pulse (EMP) weaponry on a space rocket that he has launch control over.

The game was banned in China after six months of sales (having passed censor inspection with an incomplete copy of the game that lacked the final six levels of Chinese content), because it was perceived to damage the Chinese army's image.

== Plot ==
The game's protagonist, David Llewellyn Jones, an agent working for the Institute for Geotactical Intelligence and former British SAS operator, is sent to the Carpathian Mountains to recover a set of prototype EMP chips stolen by a group of Russian mafia from a high-tech US facility. After HALO jumping and infiltrating a weather station via a mineshaft, Jones successfully retrieves a chip that was stolen. The researchers at IGI conclude after close examination that the chip that Jones found was actually an improved version of the stolen chip. His mission director (Phillip White having replaced an injured Rebecca Anya) then commands him to retrieve the remaining EMP chips so that IGI can launch a full-scale research on the chips to determine their real usage for which they were stolen. He is then transported via helicopter to a local Russian storage facility near the Ukrainian border where a convoy carrying the chips is due to arrive. He is instructed to obtain C4 explosives from the facility and destroy the bridge on which the convoy would pass and retrieve the chips by intercepting the convoy. Afterwards, Jones is then transported to a Russian weapons production facility to get the blueprints of the chip and destroy the equipment making the chips. After he completes his objective, he is betrayed by his helicopter pilot, Robert Quest and mission director, Phillip White as they steal the EMP chips obtained by Jones from the IGI headquarters. Jones is forced to jump from the helicopter in which he was being carried after being held at gunpoint by Quest. He survives the jump and finds himself at the borders of Ukraine and Romania, where he is forced to evade the incoming border patrols while being ill-equipped.

The IGI is unable to find the whereabouts of White and Quest after this incident but after Jones recovers from his injuries and is debriefed by Senator Pat Lenahan, he learns from him that the two men took years to infiltrate the IGI and gain its trust and that White had made several weapons and military deals with Jach Priboi in Libya. Anya returns as Jones' mission director, and he sets off to Libya under the orders of Senator Lenahan to search for Priboi for more information on his deals with White. Priboi is in custody of the Libyan Intelligence as he was supplying weapons to the rebel forces. After Jones finds Priboi, he is captured by the Libyan intelligence commander Major Zaleb Said. The two are then transported to a heavily guarded Libyan prison. While they are being transported, Priboi asks Jones about his purpose of seeking him out and Jones responds by saying that he is after his former mission director Phillip White and that the IGI knows that White made weapon deals with him. Priboi then reveals that he made a lot of deals with White and sold him advanced military equipment. His last order from Priboi was a Russian A-90 Orlyonok ekranoplan which was awaiting delivery on a port in Egypt. Priboi further reveals that the shipping papers of this order were in a safe in Priboi's villa which was currently taken over by Major Said and being used as his base of operations.

After rescuing Priboi and escaping from the prison in a military truck, Jones and Priboi arrive at his villa which is crawling with Major Said's guards. After infiltrating the villa and taking care of the guards, Priboi discovers that Major Said had taken away the shipping papers from the villa. He asks Jones to retrieve his armored Kamov Ka-27 helicopter gunship along with his store of weapons from a nearby airfield currently in control by Major Said's forces. Jones agrees to help him get his goods in exchange for information on the shipment. The two men then fly to Major Said's base after dealing with and stopping the advances of reinforcement convoys and retrieve the papers after killing Major Said. Upon returning to his villa, Priboi informs Jones after inspecting the papers that the trade he made with David's former mission director was on Port Bur Safaga in Egypt and that Robert Quest would be taking delivery of the vehicle in 3 days.

Jones sets off to the port with this information, where he is instructed by Anya to find the Ekranoplan and a crate of stolen EMP chips. While searching the logbooks to find the ekranoplan, Jones discovers that Quest and White were actually cooperating with an unknown country to operate the chips. He is confronted and captured by Quest in the process who orders his men to get rid of Jones by dumping him in the sea. Jones ambushes Quest's men and kills him after a confrontation. He then leaves Egypt on the ekranoplan to the unknown country which is later revealed to be the Spratly Islands near China, where, according to Anya, suspicious activities are being carried out throughout the time being. Upon arriving at the Islands, Jones finds his former mission director cooperating in secrecy with a Chinese general, whose identity is confirmed later to be General Wu Xing.

After Jones infiltrates the General Xing's underground weapons lab, he finds out White executed by General Xing, after the two have a heated argument about Quest's whereabouts and White accuses General Xing of killing Quest at his disdain for the matter. Anya meanwhile finds out that General Xing intends to launch an EMP cannon via a rocket into outer space in order to take out military satellites and gain control of the military network thus setting the stage for World War III. Jones confronts General Xing at the lab and kills him after taking care of his forces.

Jones then travels to a heavily guarded rocket launch pad where the rocket loaded with the canon is ready for its launch. Anya, who is also travelling with CIA teams onboard a helicopter, asks him to disable the system immediately before the launch is made. Jones succeeds in preventing the rocket from heading towards its programmed destination and to detonate somewhere safe and CIA teams take control of the launch pad.

== Gameplay ==
=== Missions ===
The game is divided into 19 missions. The story is presented in cutscenes, shown before and after every mission, with animated characters rendered in real-time and pre-recorded speech. Missions have objectives that must be completed before the mission ends.

Straightforward approaches are not encouraged, with stealthy and covert movement giving the player a better rating, rank and chance of survival, with the highest attainable ranking entitled 'David Jones'.

Most missions can be completed many ways, with the most straightforward being combat. Certain missions must be completed entirely in stealth.

At the start of a new game, a difficulty level can be chosen, changing the number of bullets Jones takes before dying, the intelligence of the enemy and group AI, and the number of save-games available.

=== Covert operation ===
Jones is equipped with lock picks, and safe crackers making him capable of forced entry into any locked room or safe, enabling noiseless and stealthy entry into restricted areas and buildings, and obtaining military secrets or private information, and objects. Remote-controlled CR-4 explosives are also available for use on certain ground targets, meaning large structures can be destroyed safely, from a distance, leaving Jones undetected. Air strikes can be called for on certain missions, using the laser designator to pinpoint ground targets for bombing.

== Reception ==
Reception

Aggregate score
Aggregator	Score
Metacritic	64/100

Review scores
Publication	Score
Computer Games Magazine	3/5
Computer Gaming World	1.5/5
Edge	5/10
Eurogamer	8/10
Game Informer	7.25/10
GameRevolution	C−
GameSpot	5.6/10
GameZone	7.5/10
IGN	8/10
PC Gamer (US)	59%
Entertainment Weekly	B+

The game received "mixed" reviews according to the review aggregation website Metacritic. IGN gave it a favourable review over a month before its U.S. release date.
