= Project I.G.I. =

2000 first-person shooter video game

- North American cover art
- Developer: Innerloop Studios
- Publisher: Eidos Interactive
- Director: Andrew Wensley
- Producers: Richard Carter; Frank Hom
- Designer: Gavin Skinner
- Programmer: Ole Marius Liabo
- Artist: Olav-Rasmus Vorren
- Composer: Kim M. Jensen
- Platform: Microsoft Windows
- Release: December 8, 2000
- Genre: Tactical shooter
- Mode: Single player

Project I.G.I. (released in North America as Project I.G.I.: I'm Going In) is a tactical first-person shooter video game. It was developed by Innerloop Studios and released in December 2000 by Eidos Interactive. The game received mixed reviews due to shortcomings including a poorly programmed A.I., lack of a mid-game save option, and the lack of multiplayer features. However, it was praised for its sound design and graphics, thanks in part to its use of a proprietary game engine that was previously used in Innerloop's Joint Strike Fighter.

It was followed up in 2003 by I.G.I.-2: Covert Strike.

A prequel titled I.G.I. Origins was announced by publisher Toadman Interactive in 2019 and was being developed by AntiMatter Games with no release date announced. In May 2023, Antimatter Games announced the closure of the development studio.

== Plot ==
Former British SAS agent David Llewellyn Jones is sent by the Pentagon to Tallinn, Estonia, where he is to track down and extract a kidnapped Estonian arms dealer Josef Priboi, who has vital information regarding the recent theft of an American W-88 nuclear warhead from a storage depot in Germany. Aided by his Pentagon handler Rebecca Anya, Jones follows Josef's trail through several military bases and eventually locates him in a compound operated by Priboi's organization. A team of ex Green Berets led by Captain Harrison is sent out to extract Priboi with Jones providing sniper cover. Upon being rescued, Josef, who was kidnapped by his uncle Jach, reveals that Jach is attempting to sell the warhead to a mysterious party.

After hacking into the comms network operated by Jach with the aid of Jones, Anya discovers that Jach has proceeded to sell the warhead to the mysterious party. Anya locates Jach to one of his remote bases of operation and sends out Captain Harrison and his team to capture Jach with the aid of Jones. However, their helicopter pilot is wounded during the exchange between Jach's armed men and Harrison's team when their convoy of vehicles is intercepted by Captain Harrison and his men after which Jones agrees to pilot the helicopter to extract Jach. The helicopter is shot down by two Russian Sukhoi Su-27 fighter jets near the Russian border after Jones fails to direct the helicopter to a bearing reiterated by an unknown radio transmission. A group of Spetsnaz soldiers arrive to investigate the crash site; the group's mysterious female commander, known only by her call sign 'Ekk', orders them to capture Jach and execute Jones, but Jones manages to escape his attackers and crosses the border back to Estonia, where he is rescued by a helicopter.

Anya informs Jones that Jach is being transported by train to an unknown location; the two surmise that Ekk is likely a rogue military or ex-KGB officer. Jones intercepts and hijacks the train carrying Jach, but the train is derailed by the same fighter jets from before, sent by Ekk. Jones and Jach escape Ekk's forces and evacuate the area via another helicopter.

Soon after, Jones is ordered to retrieve the warhead and capture Ekk at her base of operations - a former KGB training camp, located in a ruined mountain castle. Jones infiltrates the complex but fails to prevent Ekk from escaping and finds the warhead dismantled. Anya deduces that Ekk has used components of the warhead to construct a suitcase nuke, and tracks Ekk's Mil Mi-24 helicopter to an old plutonium refinement plant, which houses a functional nuclear reactor. Jones infiltrates the facility and grants Anya remote access to its communication network. Anya arrives at the plant to disable the warhead after it is discovered that Ekk has made the warhead operational. During the ensuing encounter, Jones kills Ekk in a duel which results in Anya getting wounded. The final cutscene shows Jones conversing with a wounded Anya before they are extracted.

== Reception ==
Reception

Aggregate score
Aggregator	Score
Metacritic	70/100

Review scores
Publication	Score
AllGame	3/5
CNET Gamecenter	7/10
Computer Games Strategy Plus	3/5
Computer Gaming World	2.5/5
Edge	6/10
Eurogamer	8/10
Game Informer	3.5/10
GameRevolution	C
GameSpot	7.5/10
GameSpy	74%
IGN	7/10
Next Generation	2/5
PC Gamer (US)	49%

The game received "average" reviews according to the review aggregation website Metacritic. Samuel Bass of NextGen said that the game "quickly transforms itself into a frustratingly mediocre experience." Air Hendrix of GamePro called it "a tough but addictive covert-ops mission that's definitely worth volunteering for." (Note: GamePro gave the game three 4.5/5 scores for graphics, control, and fun factor, and 4/5 for sound.)

It received a "Silver" sales award from the Entertainment and Leisure Software Publishers Association (ELSPA), indicating sales of at least 100,000 units in the U.K.
