= Kjartan Berland =

Norwegian politician

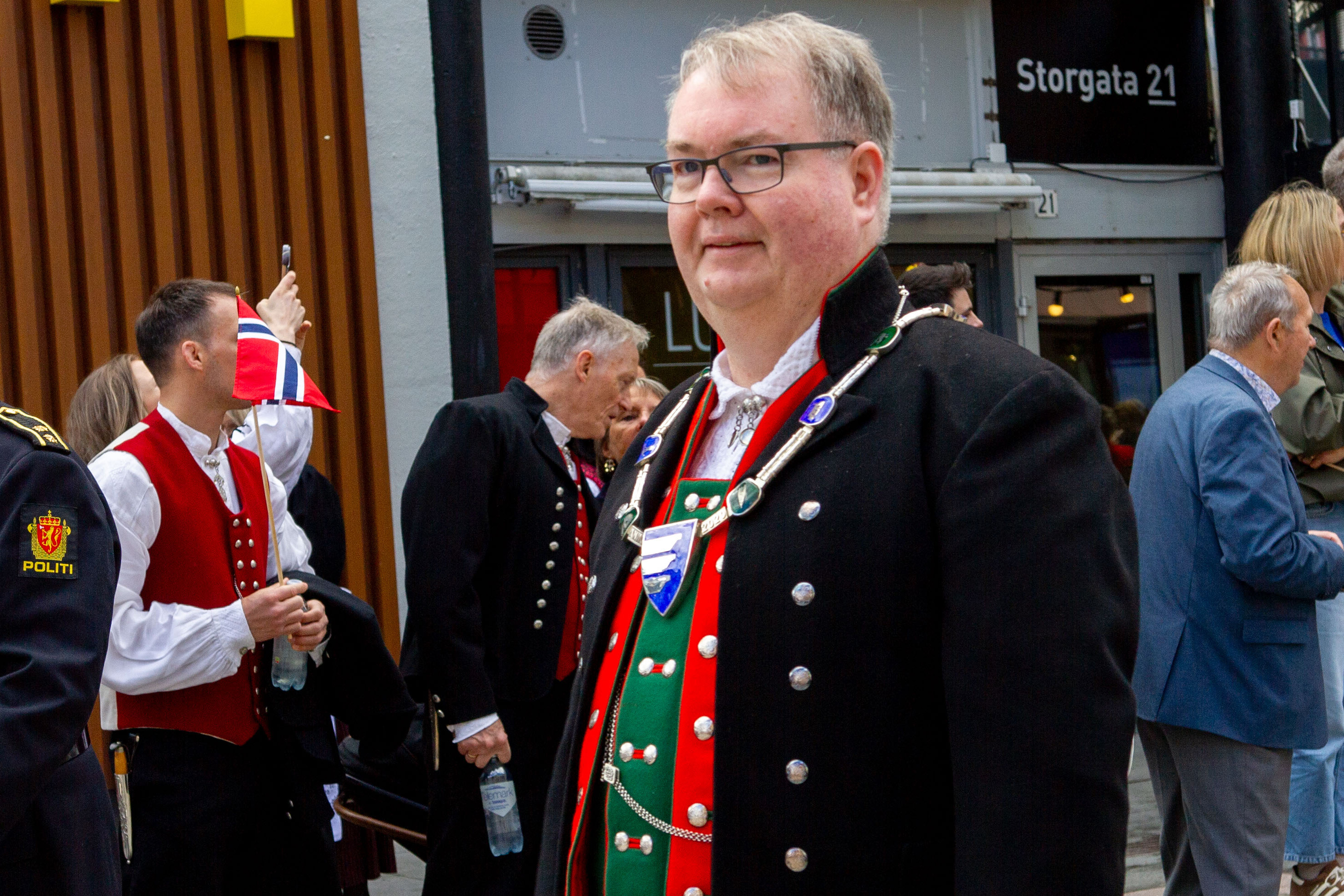

Mayor of Lillestrøm
- Incumbent
- Assumed office 12 October 2023
- Deputy: Anette Carnarius Elseth (FrP); Brede Andreas Rørhus (FrP)
- Preceded by: Jørgen Vik (Ap)

Deputy Member of the Storting
- In office 1 October 2013 – 30 September 2021
- Constituency: Akershus

Personal details
- Born: 28 September 1972 (age 53)
- Party: Conservative

Kjartan Berland (born 28 September 1972) is a Norwegian politician for the Conservative Party (H). He is the current mayor of Lillestrøm municipality since 2023.

He was elected as deputy representative to the Parliament of Norway from Akershus for the terms 2013–2017 and 2017–2021. Berland has been a member of Skedsmo municipal council and Akershus county council. He has also been a board member of Lillestrøm SK and the Football Association of Norway.
