= Innerloop Studios =

Norwegian video game developer

- Company type: Video game developer
- Industry: Video games
- Founded: May 28, 1996
- Defunct: June 2003; 23 years ago
- Headquarters: Oslo, Norway

Innerloop Studios (commonly just Innerloop) was a Norwegian video game developer operating from 1996 to 2003. The company was founded as Innerloop Technologies in May 1996 by a group of ex-employees of the Oslo-based video game company Funcom. After entering into a partnership with the video game developer and publisher Eidos Interactive, Innerloop merged with DiMaga Studios in 1997 and changed its name to Innerloop Studios to reflect the merger. In the fall of 2000, Swedish electronic entertainment company Vision Park acquired the studio. In 2002, Innerloop once again became an independent company before shutting its doors in June 2003. The company was unable to obtain funding to create future titles, so they finally decided to shut down the studio.

== History ==
Company staff numbers ranged between 15 and 25 at various times throughout the company's existence.

Innerloop was widely known for its graphics technology, first on display in the flight simulator JSF - Joint Strike Fighter, and its most popular games series 'I.G.I'. The sports game Sega Extreme Sports for Sega Dreamcast, Innerloop chose to develop exclusively for the PC platform, since their graphics technology would not work on consoles without considerable compromises to performance.

Co-founder Henning Rokling was the company's managing director until the studio shut down its operations in 2003. In addition to working with Eidos Interactive, Innerloop also worked with Infogrames, Sega, Empire Interactive and Codemasters.

== Games ==
Game	Release	Format
JSF - Joint Strike Fighter	1997	Microsoft Windows
Project I.G.I.	2000	Microsoft Windows
Xtreme Sports	2000	Sega Dreamcast, Microsoft Windows
Jul i Blåfjell	2001	Microsoft Windows
I.G.I.-2: Covert Strike	2003	Microsoft Windows
