= Kebu (musician) =

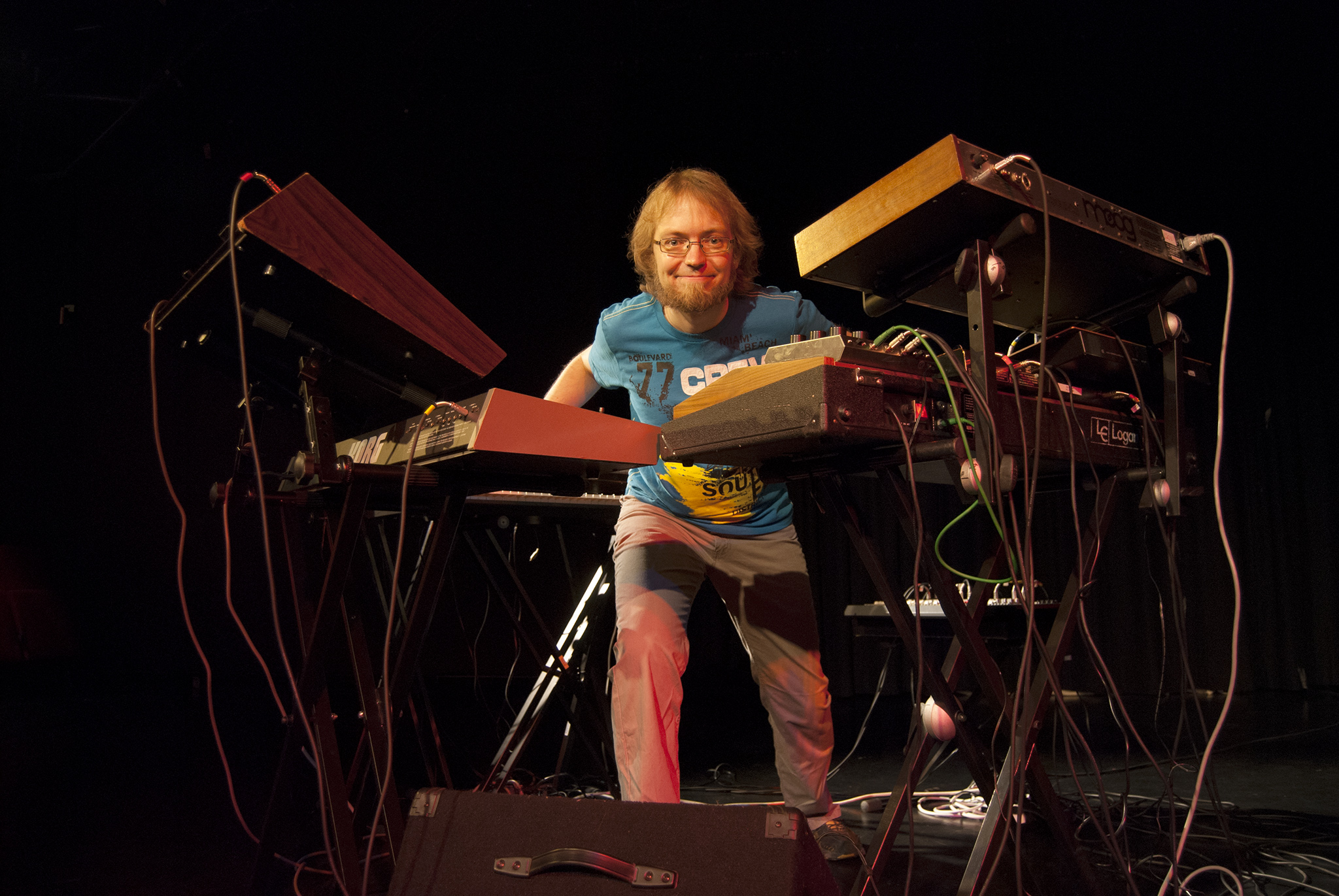
- Sebastian Teir in 2011

Background information
- Also known as: Kebu
- Born: Sebastian Teir; 1977 (age 48–49); Kristinestad, Finland
- Origin: Finland
- Genres: Electronic music
- Instrument: Keyboards
- Years active: 1999 - present
- Label: Secret Entertainment
- Website: kebu.fi

Sebastian "Kebu" Teir (born 1977 in Finland) is a Finnish keyboard player, arranger and composer.

== Career ==
Teir's musical career began in 1999, playing keyboards in the progressive rock band Prime Mover, with whom he released three albums and a demo. He has also played keyboards in the progressive metal band Kouzin Bedlam. In 2008 he joined the soul/funk band Vinyl Jam on their single Test of Wind (2008) where he played organ, Moog synthesizer, and Hohner Clavinet. The band recorded their vinyls with the principle that everything in the signal chain had to be analog. This inspired Teir to make his debut album in a similar way, with the addition of using analog synthesizers as the only instruments.

Teir recorded his debut solo album under the pseudonym Kebu in 2012, To Jupiter and Back (2012), which is inspired by the electronic music of world-renowned composers who create music on analog synthesizers, e.g. Jean-Michel Jarre, Jan Hammer, Vangelis and Giorgio Moroder. The album debuted on the Finnish Albums Chart where it peaked at number 28. To Jupiter and Back was nominated for the best album of the year at the prestigious Schallwelle Music Awards, where Kebu was also nominated as the best artist for the first time. Kebu won the award as best international artist 2017 and 2021. He gave concerts in 2015 in Stockholm (Italo Disco Party with the Swedish singer Johan Becker), in 2013 he performed during the Assembly demoparty, in 2016 in Norway (he performed during The Gathering (LAN party) in the Vikingskipet hall).

While working on his second album, Perplexagon (2016), he was inspired by the music of the 70s and 80s and contemporary electro music. The album debuted on the Finnish Albums Chart where it peaked at number 6 . In 2017, during the Perplexagon Tour 2017, he played fifty concerts throughout Europe. One of the concerts in Oslo in December 2017 was recorded and released on a DVD album. In 2017, Teir was invited by the TED organization where he gave a lecture: Analog music in a digital world. In 2018, he performed with a choir at a concert at Kristinehallen in Kristinestad, which commemorated the 100th anniversary of the founding of Finland . In 2018, the EP Kring havet - Meren ympärillä (6 tracks) with material from the concert was released. Kebu is also popular on YouTube, over 325,000 users subscribe to his channel, which has received 123 million views worldwide (from 2010 to April 2026). His most popular video is his cover of Jan Hammer's song Crockett's Theme (2012), which has received over 32 million views (April 2026). Kebu has also composed the title track (intro) and background music for the science radio program Kvanthopp, a program broadcast weekly on Finnish national radio Yle Vega. In 2020, Teir participated in the recording of the new album of the Finnish power metal band Amberian Dawn, where he provided additional keyboards. Kebu released his third studio album, Urban Dreams in 2021. In 2024, during the Synthesizer legends tour Kebu visited 13 countries outside of Finland, in Europe, with film maker Sara Langvik documenting life behind and on scene. The awaited premier of the roughly 1 hour long documentary film Kebu- space for synth is currently being decided. In June 2025, Kebu and Polish electronic music creator Madis together created a single titled Mentes Determinadas.

== Discography ==
=== Albums ===
- 2012: To Jupiter and Back
- 2016: Perplexagon
- 2019: Live In Oslo (2CD+DVD)
- 2021: Urban Dreams
- 2021: Live Online
- 2023: Trance Remixes
- 2023: Synthesizer Legends - Volume 1
- 2026: Urban Skies

=== Singles ===
- 2014: "Deep Blue" (Maxi single)
- 2018: Kring havet – Meren ympärillä (EP)
- 2021: "Hope"
- 2021: "Hope" (Talla 2XLC Remix)
- 2021: "Fleeting Lights"
- 2021: "Late for the Meeting in the Maze"
- 2022: "Super Troopers"
- 2022: "To Jupiter and Back" (Talla 2XLC Remix)
- 2022: "Clear Skies"
- 2023: "Michael's Anthem" (Daniel Kandi Remix)
- 2023: "Perplexagon Part 3" (Daniel Kandi Remix)
- 2025: "Mentes Determinadas" (Kebu&Madis)
- 2025: "Future Friday"
- 2025: Twilight (Maxi single)

== Concerts ==
- 2017: Perplexagon Tour
- 2019: Film Music Prague
- 2021: Kebu - Live Online
- 2026: Urban Skies Tour
