= Lillestrøm =

Lillestrøm Municipality Lillestrøm kommune
- Municipality
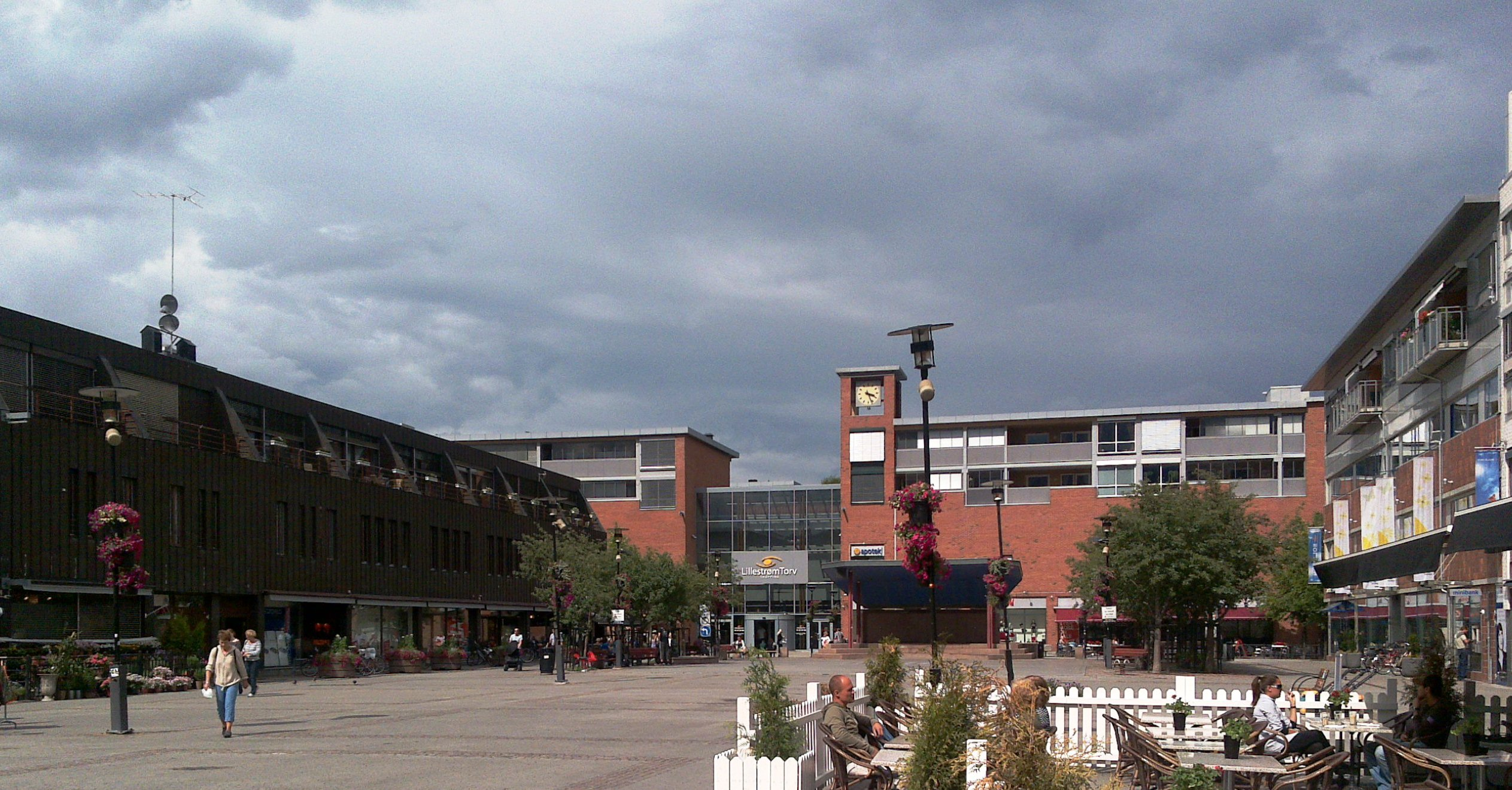
- Square in central Lillestrøm

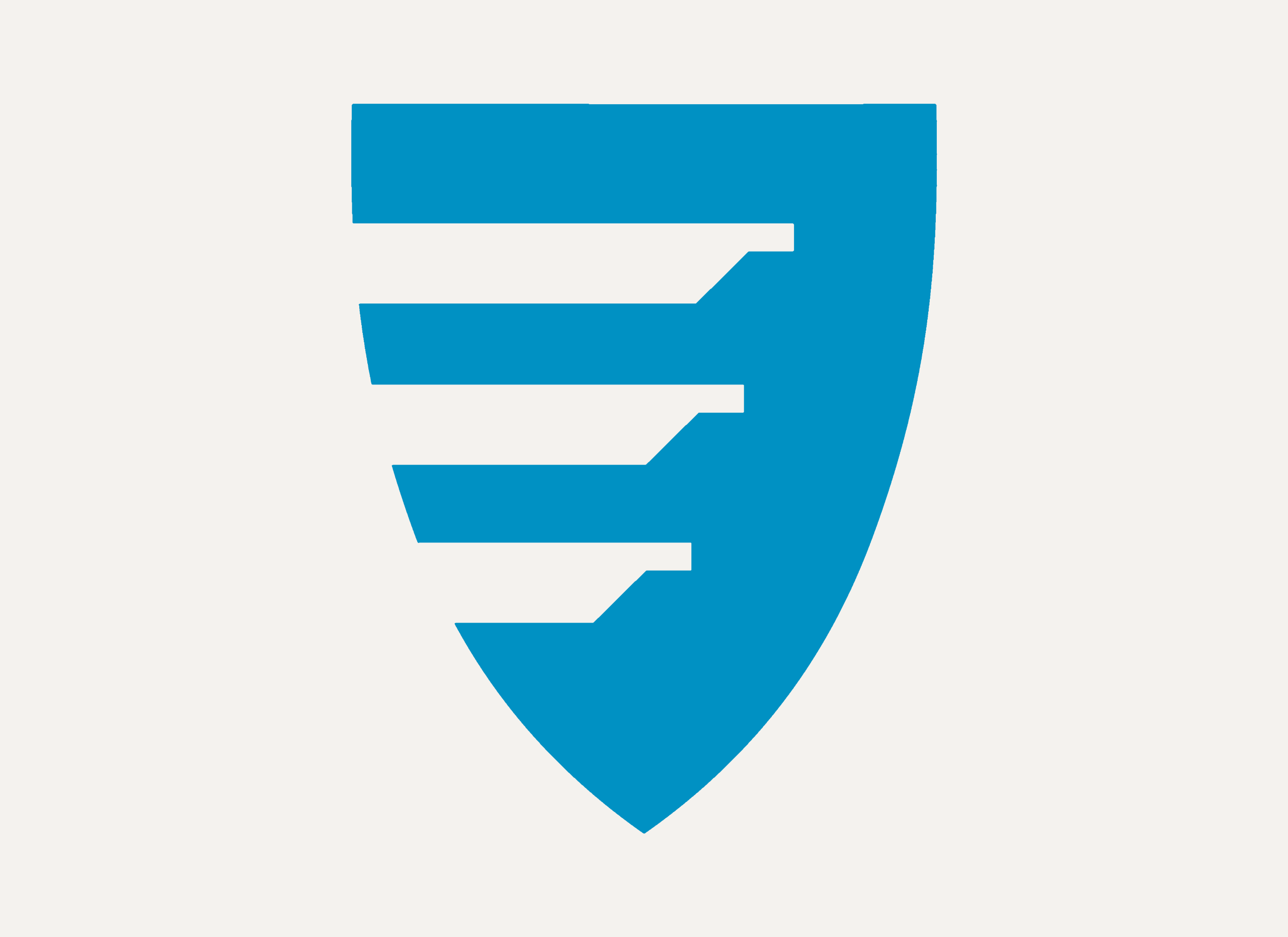
- Flag Coat of arms

- Akershus within Norway

- Lillestrøm within Akershus
- Coordinates: 59°57′N 11°05′E
- Country: Norway
- County: Akershus
- District: Romerike
- Established: 1 January 2020
- Administrative centre: Lillestrøm

Government
  - Mayor (2023): Kjartan Berland (H)

Area
  - Total: 456.61 km^{2} (176.30 sq mi)
  - Land: 422.71 km^{2} (163.21 sq mi)
  - Water: 33.9 km^{2} (13.1 sq mi)

Population (2021)
  - Total: 89,684
  - Density: 207.6/km^{2} (538/sq mi)
- Demonym: Lillestrømling

Official language
  - Norwegian form: Bokmål
- Time zone: UTC+01:00 (CET)
  - Summer (DST): UTC+02:00 (CEST)
- ISO 3166 code: NO-3205
- Website: Official website

Lillestrøm [ˈlɪlːəˌstrœm] is a municipality in Akershus county. It is located in the traditional district of Romerike. With a population of 85,757 inhabitants, it is the fourth most populated municipality in Viken. It was founded on 1 January 2020 as a merger between former municipalities Fet, Skedsmo and Sørum. The administrative centre of the municipality is the town of Lillestrøm. The town of Lillestrøm is a part of the Oslo metropolitan area.

== History ==
Lillestrøm municipality's suggested coat of arms (1961) was not chosen as the new coat of arms for the municipality established in 2020.

The name means "the little [part of] Strøm", Strøm being the name of an old and large farm (Old Norse: straumr, which also meant "stream" as well).

Lillestrøm's history dates back to the times river powered sawmills came into use for the production of building materials. Later Lillestrøm got its own steam sawmill which laid the base for the development of the area which became the town. The area was, by and large, a moss covered swamp-like area, at the time considered almost uninhabitable. However, the almost non-existent property values were judged to be a fair exchange and so the workers started living and settling in the area around the sawmill, and Lillestrøm was born. On 1 January 1908 Lillestrøm became a municipality of its own, having been split from Skedsmo. At that time Lillestrøm municipality had a population of 4,351. On 1 January 1962 the two municipalities were reunited under the name Skedsmo. Before the merger Lillestrøm municipality had a population of 10,840.

In 1997, Skedsmo municipal council declared Lillestrøm to be a town (by) in its own right (a purely honorary status which has no effect upon the organization of local government, but is a matter of local pride nonetheless). The event is commemorated in an annual 4-day street fair, which includes music by high-profile Norwegian artists on several outdoor stages, food stalls, retail business exhibitions, and thrill rides. The whole thing (with free admission to all) is held in Lillestrøm's main thoroughfare and its connecting streets, which are closed to all vehicles for the duration.

In 2002, Norway Trade Fairs moved from Skøyen to Lillestrøm.

On 26 April 2026, at 09:24:54, a M_{L} 3 earthquake with an epicenter near Lillestrøm was recorded. The earthquake was felt throughout Eastern Norway. The earthquake was measured to be c. 5 km (3.1 mi) deep. NORSAR believed the earthquake was M_{L} 3.3. Berit Marie Storheim of Norsk nasjonalt seimisk nettverk said the earthquake was registered at M_{L} 3.6. As of 26 April 2026, Oslo Police District were investigating if there were any damages. In Oslo Police District, there were no reported material damages or injuries.

== Transport ==
=== Road ===
Norwegian national road 159 is a four-lane motorway connecting central Lillestrøm directly to Oslo. The European route E6 bypasses Lillestrøm a few kilometres to the west on its way from Oslo to the north of the country. National road 22, running from northwest to southeast, passes through the northern outskirts of the conurbation.

=== Rail ===
Lillestrøm is connected to Oslo by two separate railway lines. The Trunk Line (opened 1854) runs to Oslo via the Grorud valley and is used mostly by commuter trains calling at all stations, as well as freight trains. Non-stop commuter trains, airport express trains, and long-distance expresses use the high-speed Gardermoen Line (opened 1999), which runs mostly in tunnel to Oslo.

The Trunk Line north of Lillestrøm carries frequent local passenger trains as far as Dal as well as freight trains to Eidsvoll, Lillehammer, and Trondheim.

The Gardermoen Line (the stretch of which north of Lillestrøm opened in 1998) is used by airport express trains, regional trains to Eidsvoll and Lillehammer, and long-distance passenger services to Trondheim.

Running north-east from Lillestrøm, the Kongsvinger Line (opened 1862) conveys hourly local trains to Kongsvinger as well as a number of longer-distance trains, passenger and freight, to and from Sweden.

=== Air ===
Kjeller, a village 2 km (1 mi) north of the town of Lillestrøm, is the site of Kjeller Airfield, founded in 1912, which has the closest operational runway to Oslo city centre. However, this is overshadowed by the much larger international airport at Gardermoen (opened 1998), which is 25 km (16 mi) further north but just 12 minutes away from Lillestrøm railway station by high-speed rail.

== Education ==
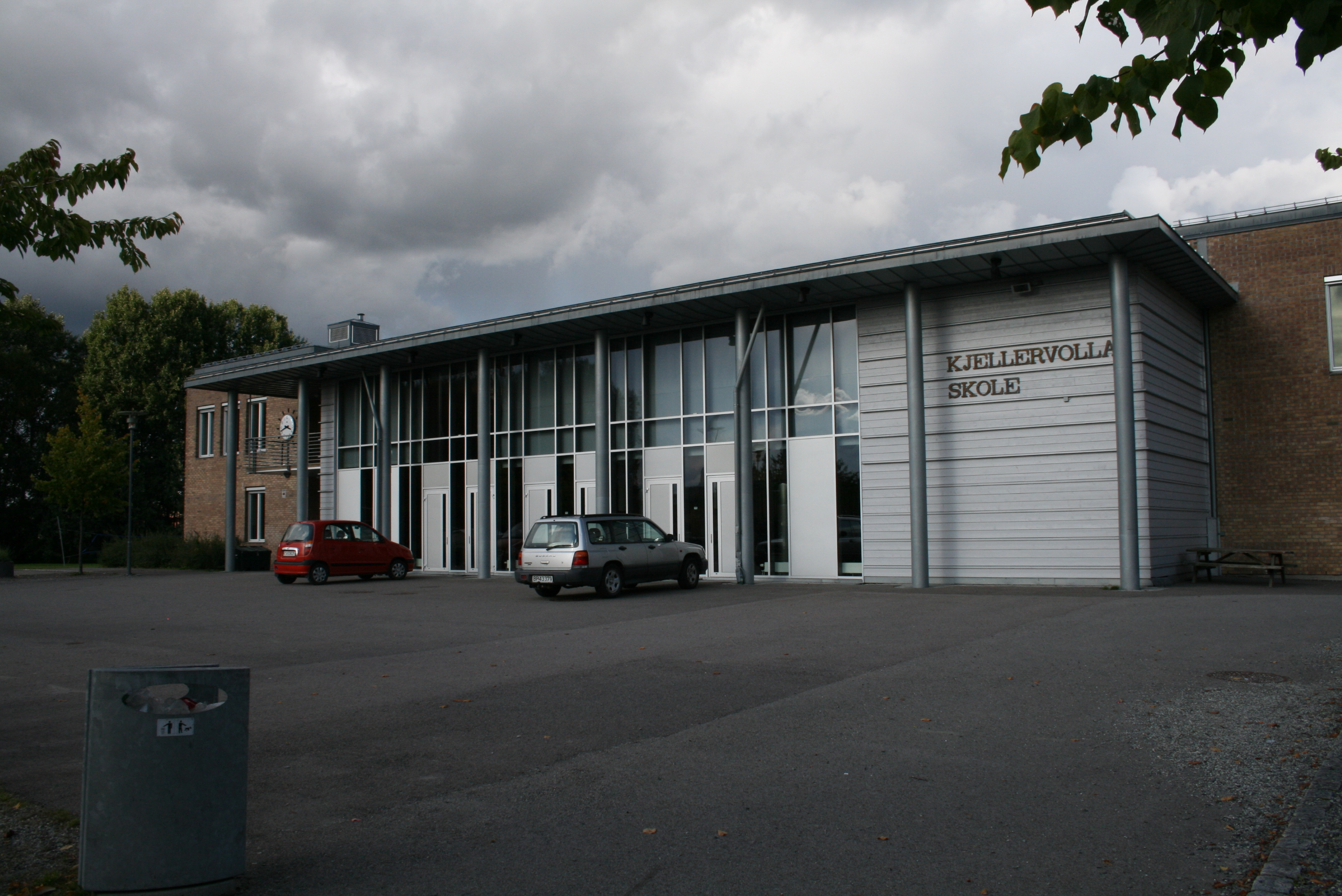
Kjellervolla lower secondary school

Lillestrøm is home to the following primary, lower secondary, and upper secondary schools:

=== Primary ===
- Asak skole
- Åsenhagen skole
- Branås skole
- Bråtejordet skole
- Dalen skole
- Garderåsen skole
- Gjellerås skole
- Haugtun skole
- Hovinhøgda skole
- Kjeller skole
- Riddersand skole
- Sagdalen skole
- Skjetten skole
- Sørum skole
- Sørumsand skole
- Stav skole
- Sten-Tærud skole
- Vardeåsen skole
- Vesterskaun skole
- Vigernes skole
- Volla skole

=== Lower secondary ===
- Asak skole
- Bingsfoss ungdomsskole
- Bråtejordet skole
- Frogner skole
- Kjeller skole
- Kjellervolla skole
- Sophie Radich skole
- Stav skole
- Østersund ungdomsskole

=== Upper secondary ===
- Lillestrøm videregående skole
- Skedsmo videregående skole
- Strømmen videregående skole
- Sørumsand videregående skole

== Government ==
Lillestrøm municipality's first mayor following the 2020 merger was Jørgen Vik of the Labour Party (Note: Not to be confused with the Tromsø-based soccer player of the same name.). As of the 2023 Norwegian local elections, the incumbent and second mayor of the municipality is Kjartan Berland of the Conservative Party.

The head office of Accident Investigation Board Norway is located in Lillestrøm.

The University College of Norwegian Correctional Service (Kriminalomsorgens høgskole og utdanningssenter, KRUS) is in Lillestrøm.

== Facilities ==
Facilities in Lillestrøm include hotels, Norway trade fairs, a brand new cinema, a mall, Lillestrøm torv, restaurants, a high speed commuter train that reaches both Oslo and Gardermoen airport (the Gardermoen Line), a community cultural house (kulturhus), and a community outdoor swimming pool complex. At Kjeller, just outside the city, there is a military airport (1912) and several research institutes.

== Sport ==
The local football club, Lillestrøm SK was founded in 1917 and currently plays in the Norwegian top division. The club is among the most successful in Norwegian football and has won five league titles in addition to seven cups. During the 70s, the club went through the divisions with back-to-back promotions before eventually winning the double in 1977, largely thanks to their legendary player Tom Lund. Their home ground is Åråsen Stadion which accommodates 10,540 spectators.

- League champion:
  - Winners (5): 1958–59, 1976, 1977, 1986, 1989
  - Runners-up (8): 1959–60, 1978, 1983, 1985, 1988, 1994, 1996, 2001
- Norwegian Cup:
  - Winners (7): 1977, 1978, 1981, 1985, 2007, 2017, 2025
  - Runners-up (8): 1953, 1955, 1958, 1980, 1986, 1992, 2005, 2022
- Royal League:
  - Runners-up (1): 2005-06

The nearby Lillestrøm stadion is used for training, and was an ice hockey venue at the 1952 Winter Olympics. There are also two indoor arenas, one multi-purpose (Skedsmohallen) and one for football (LSK-Hallen), and in 2007 a track and field stadium Romerike Friidrettsstadion was built as a cooperation between the municipalities Skedsmo, Rælingen and Lørenskog.

The local track and field club is named Minerva. Athletes such as Hanne Haugland and Håkon Särnblom have represented the club.

Rugby is represented by newly formed Rugby League club Lillestrøm Lions RLK.

== Notable people ==
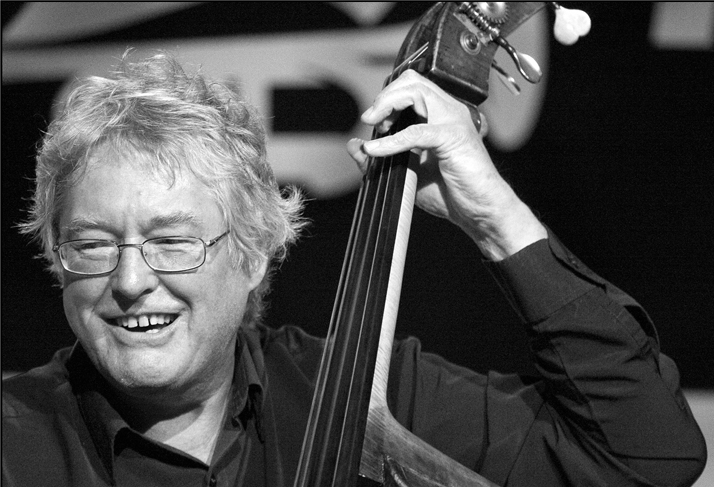
Arild Andersen, 2007

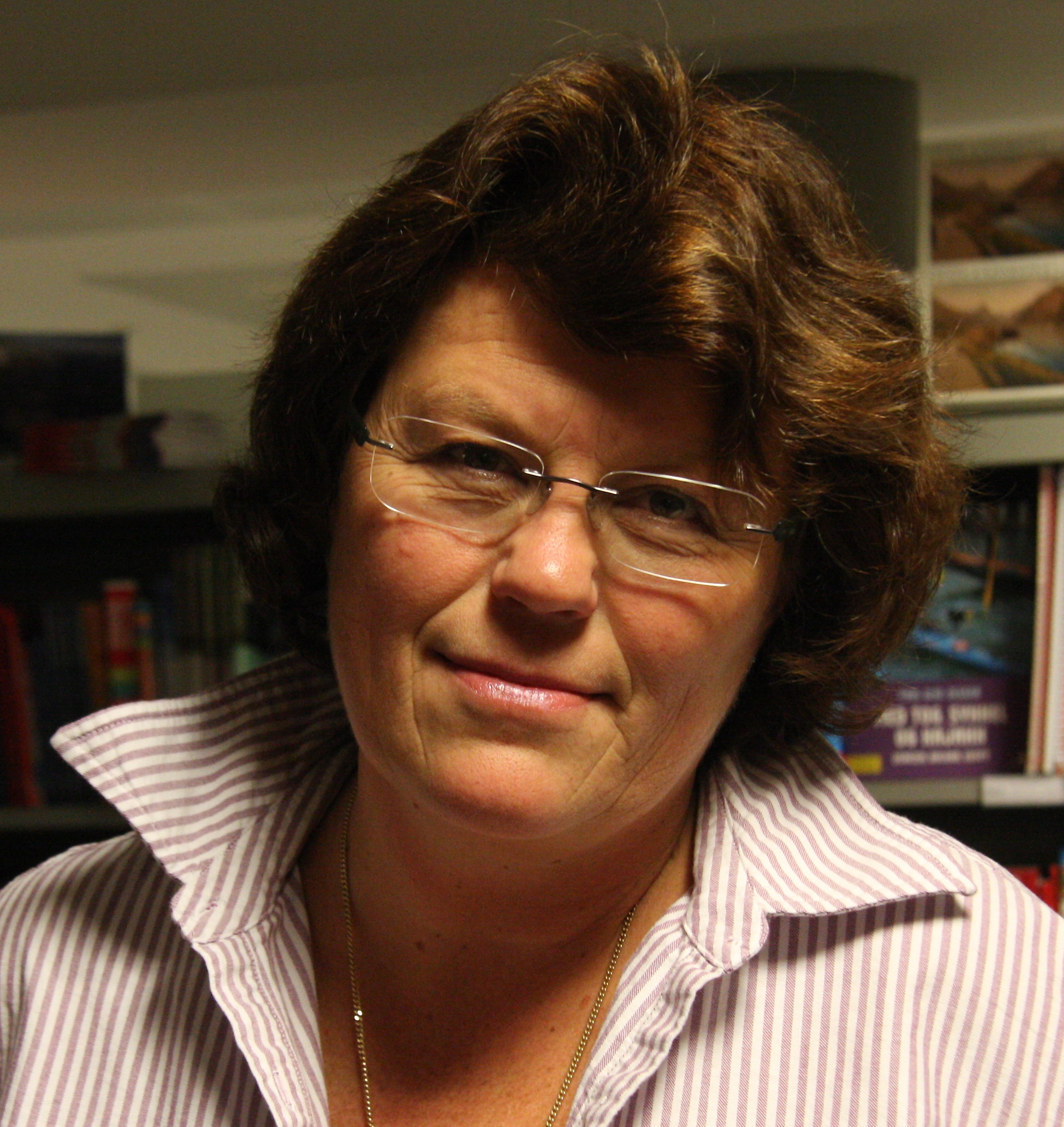
Anne Holt, 2009

- Claus Wiese (1924–1987), a Norwegian actor and American-based radio broadcaster
- Ole Edvard Borgen (1925–2009), a Norwegian theologian and Methodist bishop
- Carl Fredrik Lowzow (1927–2009), local and national politician
- Peder Borgen (1928–2023), a Norwegian Methodist minister, researches the Dead Sea Scrolls
- Gerd Grønvold Saue (1930–2022), journalist, novelist, hymnwriter and peace activist
- Jan Mangerud (born 1937), geologist, grew up in Lillestrøm
- Arild Andersen (born 1945), a Norwegian jazz bass player, born in Strømmen
- Sasha Gabor (1945–2008), a Hungarian-Norwegian actor and director
- Ole Kristian Ruud (born 1958), a conductor at the Norwegian Academy of Music
- Anne Holt (born 1958), author, lawyer and politician; grew up in Lillestrøm
- Bjarne Andre Myklebust (born 1972), media professional for NRK
- Chris Holsten (born 1993), a Norwegian singer and songwriter

=== Sport ===
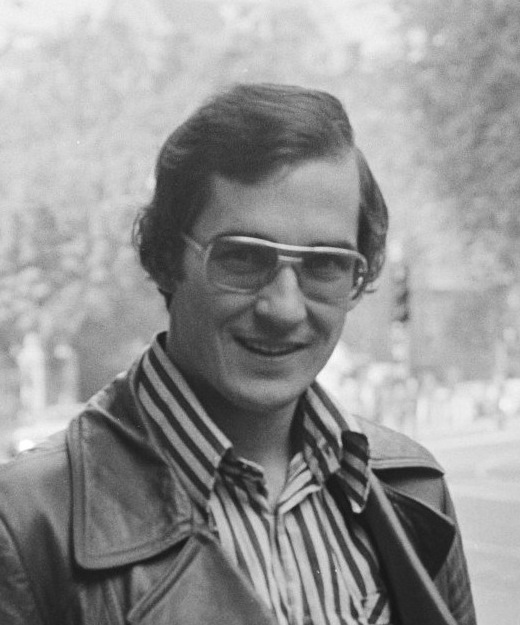
Tom Lund, 1977

- Tom Lund (1950–2026), footballer, 247 club caps with Lillestrøm SK and 47 for Norway
- Kay Stenshjemmet (born 1953), speed skater, two silver medals at the 1980 Winter Olympics
- Erik Solér (born 1960), a footballer with 39 caps with Norway national football team
- Bjørn Nyland (born 1962), a Norwegian speed skater
- Bente Nordby (born 1974), a former football goalkeeper, with 172 caps with Norway women
- Pål Steffen Andresen (born 1982), footballer with over 320 club caps
- Thomas Skoglund (born 1983), handball player, 41 matches with the Norwegian national team
- Fredrik Gulbrandsen (born 1992), footballer with over 220 club caps
