= Joint Strike Fighter (video game) =

1997 video game

- Developer(s): Innerloop Studios
- Publisher(s): Eidos Interactive
- Designer(s): Thomas Hagen
- Programmer(s): Thomas Hagen
- Artist(s): Rune Spaans
- Composer(s): Kim M. Jensen
- Platform(s): Microsoft Windows
- Release: December 10, 1997
- Genre(s): Air combat simulation
- Mode(s): Single-player, multiplayer

Joint Strike Fighter is a 1997 combat flight simulator designed by Innerloop Studios and published by Eidos Interactive. Innerloop produced the game chiefly to be a showcase for their cutting edge game engine, which they planned to license to other game developers. The game engine was later adapted to Project I.G.I..

== Gameplay ==
The game lets the player assume the role of wing commander of an unnamed western alliance campaigning in four different (fictional) war scenarios taking place in Afghanistan, Colombia, Korea, and the Kola Peninsula. The player may pilot either of the two prototype multi-role combat aircraft that contended in the Joint Strike Fighter Program: the Lockheed Martin X-35 (later selected for production) and the Boeing X-32. The player is accompanied in air combat by up to three AI-controlled wingmen. Alternatively, the player can engage in pure dogfighting against either the computer or human opponents through online multiplayer and spawn installation modes.
