= Skedsmohallen =

Indoor arena in Lillestrøm, Norway

Coordinates: 59°57′44″N 11°04′11″E

Skedsmohallen is an indoor arena located in Lillestrøm, Norway. It was built between 1981 and 1982. Today it is primarily used for handball, but was used extensively for concerts in the 1980s and early 1990s. Its viability as a concert venue deteriorated with the opening of the Oslo Spektrum in 1990. Notable artists that performed at Skedsmohallen include Billy Idol, Eric Clapton, Alice Cooper, Santana, Kiss and Def Leppard.
