= Bjarne Andre Myklebust =

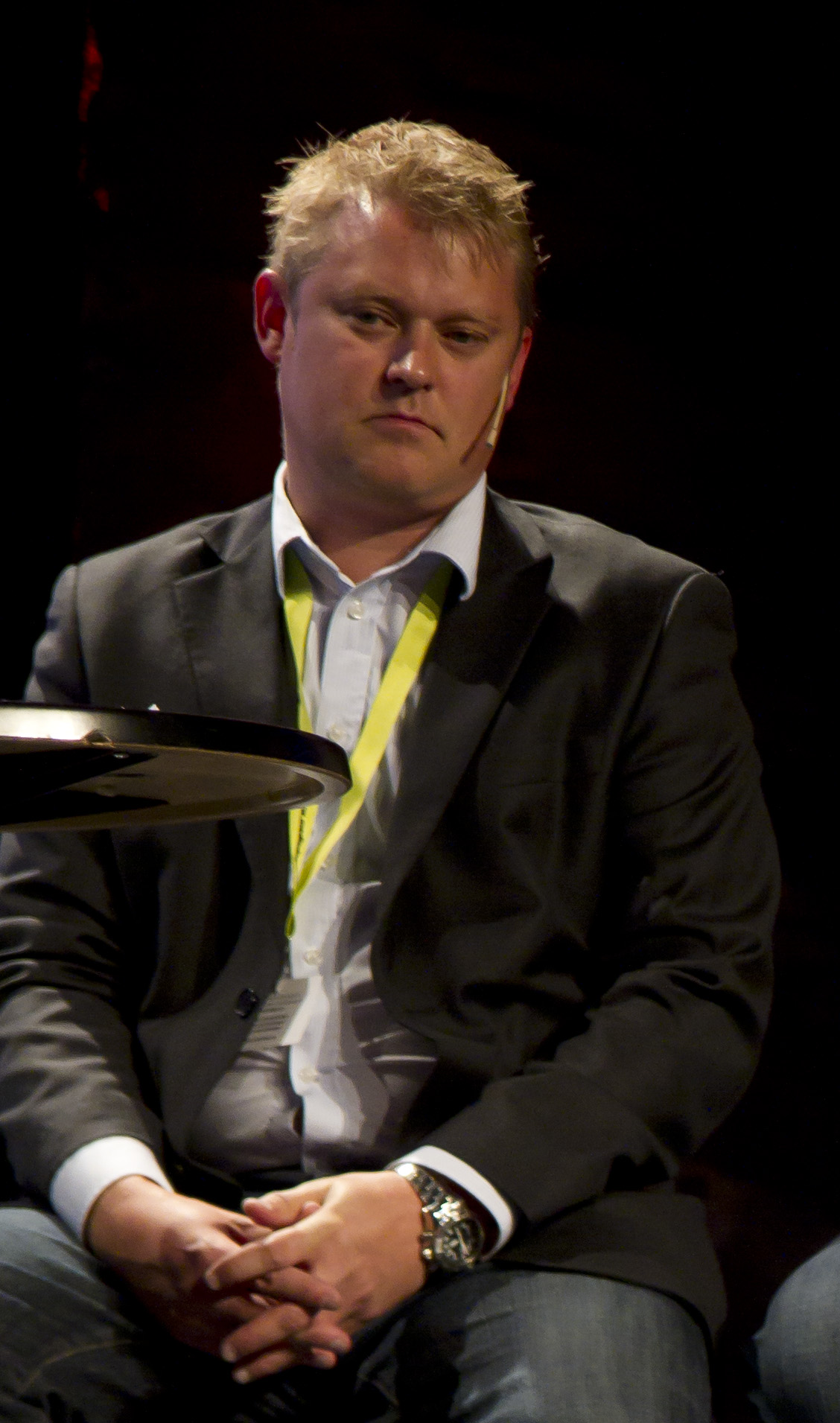
Bjarne André Myklebust, 2011

Bjarne Andre Myklebust (born 27 September 1972) is a Norwegian media professional and Head of Distribution at Norwegian Broadcasting Corporation NRK.

He has developed and implemented Internet strategies for the Norwegian Broadcasting Corp. through roles as Development Manager, CTO, Managing Editor and Chief Editor and Head of new media for nrk.no and yr.no.

In 2008 he received award as "Best innovative editor" of Oslo Editors' Association. The jury pointed in particular on the success of the weather service yr.no contributed to NRK growth. yr.no is a joint service by the Norwegian Meteorological Institute and has over 3,000,000 unique visitors a week.

In March 2014 Myklebust was recognized and named as the most influential person in the "new television industry» Nordic region by VODProfessional.com for his longstanding commitment on using the internet as a platform for modern distribution of television content. Myklebust topped the list again in 2015.
