= List of Rosenborg BK managers =

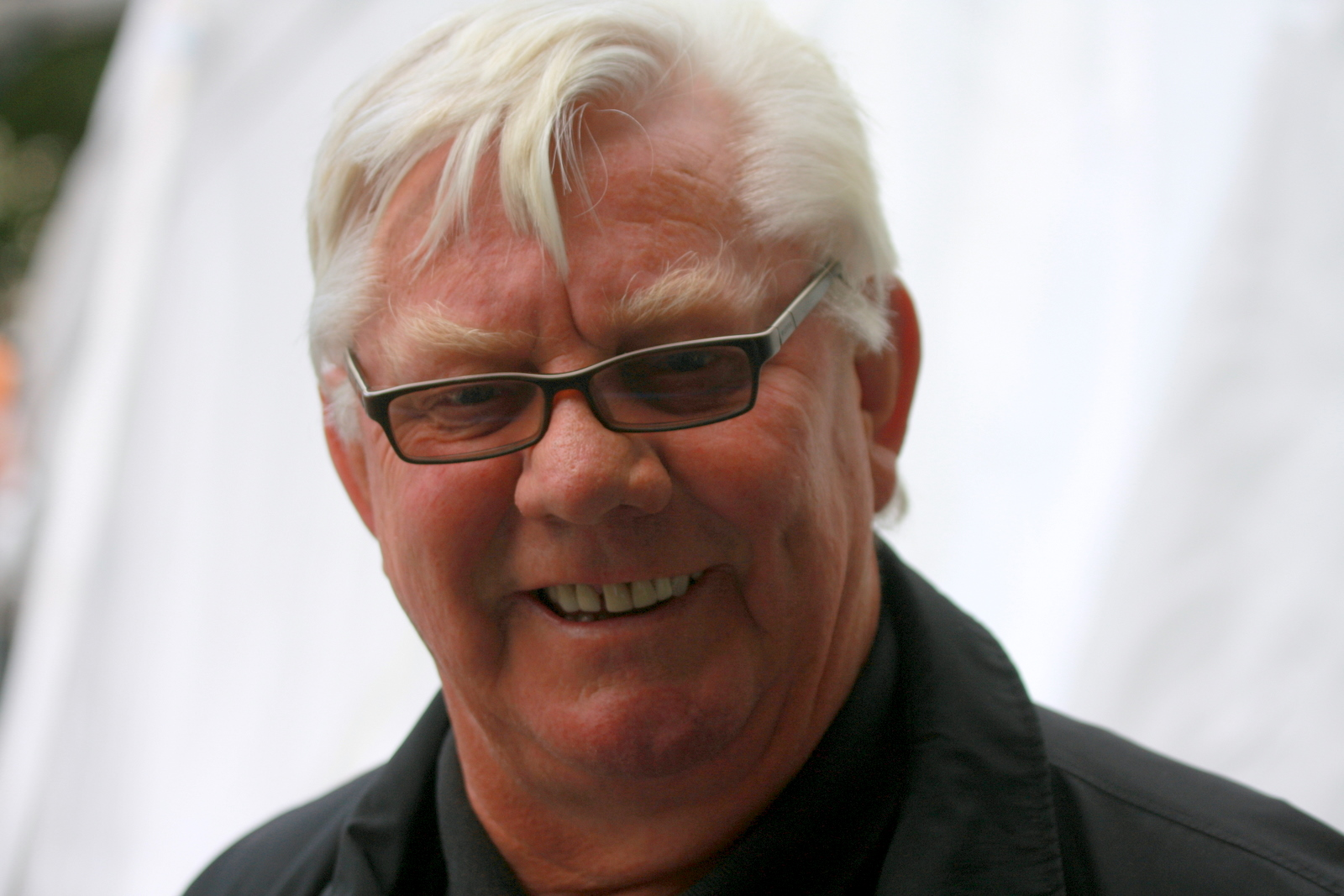
Nils Arne Eggen has been manager for 729 matches and 22 seasons in five spurs between 1971 and 2010.

Rosenborg Ballklub is an association football club based in Trondheim, Norway. Twenty people have been manager of Rosenborg since 1965, when the position was created. Rosenborg reached the First Division (from 1992 the Norwegian Premier League) in 1967 and has played at that level ever since, except in 1978. Nils Arne Eggen is the club's longest-serving manager, having led the team for 22 seasons in five spurs between 1971 and 2010. He won the premiership in his inaugural season and has led the team for 14 of the club's 23 league-winning seasons. Eggen is also the one with the most matches as manager of Rosenborg, with 729 matches, while Tor Røste Fossen and Jon Jönsson, who are split second on the list, only were in charge of the team for 89 matches. Erik Hamrén managed the team for 85 matches between 2008 and 2010, before he took over the Sweden national team. Per Joar Hansen, who led the team for one season in 2006, has been the manager since 2013.

== Managers ==
The following is a list of Rosenborg BK's managers. It lists the manager's name, nationality, period, number of games played (P), top domestic league titles and other honors. When only a year is given, it indicates that the manager started before the beginning of the season or left after the end of the season.

List of Rosenborg BK managers
Name	Nationality	From	To	P	League titles	Other honors
Knut Næss	Norway	1965	1968	—	1967	1966 Second Division; Norwegian Football Cup: 1960, 1964
George Curtis	England	1969	1970	49	1969	—
Nils Arne Eggen	Norway	1971	1971	30	1971	1971 Norwegian Football Cup
Nils Arne Eggen and Tor Røste Fossen	Norway	1972	1972	32	—	—
Tor Røste Fossen	Norway	1973	1974	57	—	—
Jan Christiansen	Norway	1975	1975	28	—	—
George Curtis	England	1976	27 August 1976	17	—	—
Nils Arne Eggen	Norway	27 August 1976	1976	7	—	—
Bjørn Rime	Norway	1977	1977	26	—	—
Nils Arne Eggen	Norway	1978	1982	129	—	1978 Second Division
Tommy Cavanagh	England	1983	1 September 1983	21	—	—
Harald Sunde	Norway	1 September 1983	1983	5	—	—
Bjørn Hansen	Norway	1984	22 August 1985	47	1985	—
Arne Dokken	Norway	22 August 1985	1985	8	1985	—
Torkild Brakstad	Norway	1986	1 July 1986	8	—	—
Arne Dokken	Norway	1 July 1986	1987	50	—	—
Nils Arne Eggen	Norway	1988	1997	339	1988, 1990, 1992, 1993, 1994, 1995, 1996, 1997	Norwegian Football Cup: 1988, 1990, 1992, 1995
Trond Sollied	Norway	1998	1998	39	1998	—
Nils Arne Eggen	Norway	1999	2002	159	1999, 2000, 2001, 2002	1999 Norwegian Football Cup
Åge Hareide	Norway	2003	2003	41	2003	2003 Norwegian Football Cup
Ola By Rise	Norway	2004	2004	46	2004	—
Per Joar Hansen	Norway	2005	8 August 2005	28	—	—
Per-Mathias Høgmo	Norway	8 August 2005	8 June 2006	31	2006	—
Knut Tørum	Norway	8 June 2006	26 October 2007	61	2006	—
Trond Henriksen (Caretaker)	Norway	26 October 2007	31 May 2008	16	—	—
Erik Hamrén	Sweden	1 June 2008	25 May 2010	85	2009, 2010	2008 Intertoto Cup; 2010 Superfinalen
Nils Arne Eggen	Norway	25 May 2010	2010	33	2010	—
Jan Jönsson	Sweden	2011	2012	89	—	—
Per Joar Hansen	Norway	2013	21 July 2014	63	—	—
Kåre Ingebrigtsen	Norway	21 July 2014	19 July 2018	176	2015, 2016, 2017	Norwegian Football Cup: 2015, 2016; Mesterfinalen: 2017, 2018
Rini Coolen (Caretaker)	Netherlands	19 July 2018	2018	29	2018	2018 Norwegian Football Cup
Eirik Horneland	Norway	2019	25 June 2020	51	—	—
Trond Henriksen (Caretaker)	Norway	26 June 2020	31 August 2020	14	—	—
Åge Hareide	Norway	1 September 2020	31 December 2021	55	—	—
Kjetil Rekdal	Norway	1 January 2022	16 June 2023	47	—	—
Svein Maalen (Caretaker)	Norway	16 June 2023	31 December 2023	23	—	—
Alfred Johansson	Sweden	1 January 2024	—	41	—	—
