= Frode Grodås =

Norwegian footballer (born 1964)

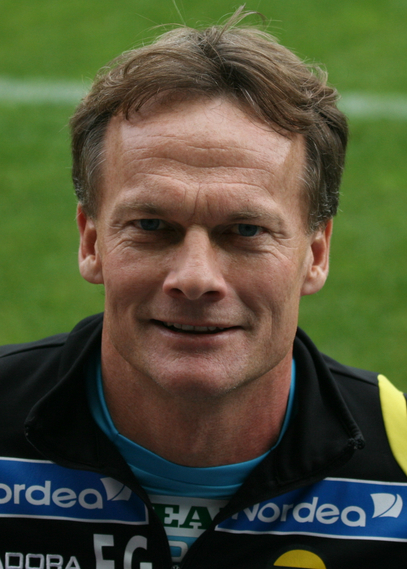
- Grodås in 2008 as Lillestrøm coach

Personal information
- Full name: Frode Grodås
- Date of birth: 24 October 1964 (age 61)
- Place of birth: Volda, Norway
- Height: 1.87 m (6 ft 2 in)
- Position: Goalkeeper

Team information
- Current team: AGF (goalkeeping coach); Norway (goalkeeping coach)

Youth career
- –1982: Hornindal

Senior career*
Years	Team	Apps	(Gls)
1982–1986	Sogndal		(0)
1987–1996	Lillestrøm	182	(1)
1996–1998	Chelsea	21	(0)
1998	Tottenham Hotspur	0	(0)
1998–2002	Schalke 04	3	(0)
1999	→ Racing Santander (loan)	6	(0)
2002–2003	Hønefoss	49	(0)
2007	Lillestrøm	0	(0)

International career
1981	Norway U-16	2	(0)
1982	Norway U-19	3	(0)
1989	Norway U-21	5	(0)
1991–2002	Norway	50	(0)

Managerial career
- 2006: HamKam
- 2007–2010: Lillestrøm (goalkeeping coach)
- 2010–: Norway (goalkeeping coach)
- 2024: AGF (goalkeeping coach)
- * Club domestic league appearances and goals

Frode Grodås (born 24 October 1964) is a Norwegian football coach and former national team goalkeeper. He participated at the 1998 FIFA World Cup as well as being an unused substitute at the 1994 FIFA World Cup.

== Early life ==
Originally from Hornindal Municipality in Sogn og Fjordane, Grodås was born in Volda, Norway.

== Playing career ==
During his career he played for several Norwegian clubs. After his ten-year spell at Lillestrøm he spent six years abroad, in England, Germany and Spain. He won the English FA Cup in 1997 with Chelsea, keeping a clean sheet in a 2–0 win in the final. He rounded off his career with Norwegian Division One team Hønefoss.

Grodås was last capped in 2002, aged 37 years and 318 days, and is the fourth oldest player at the Norwegian national team.

== Coaching career ==
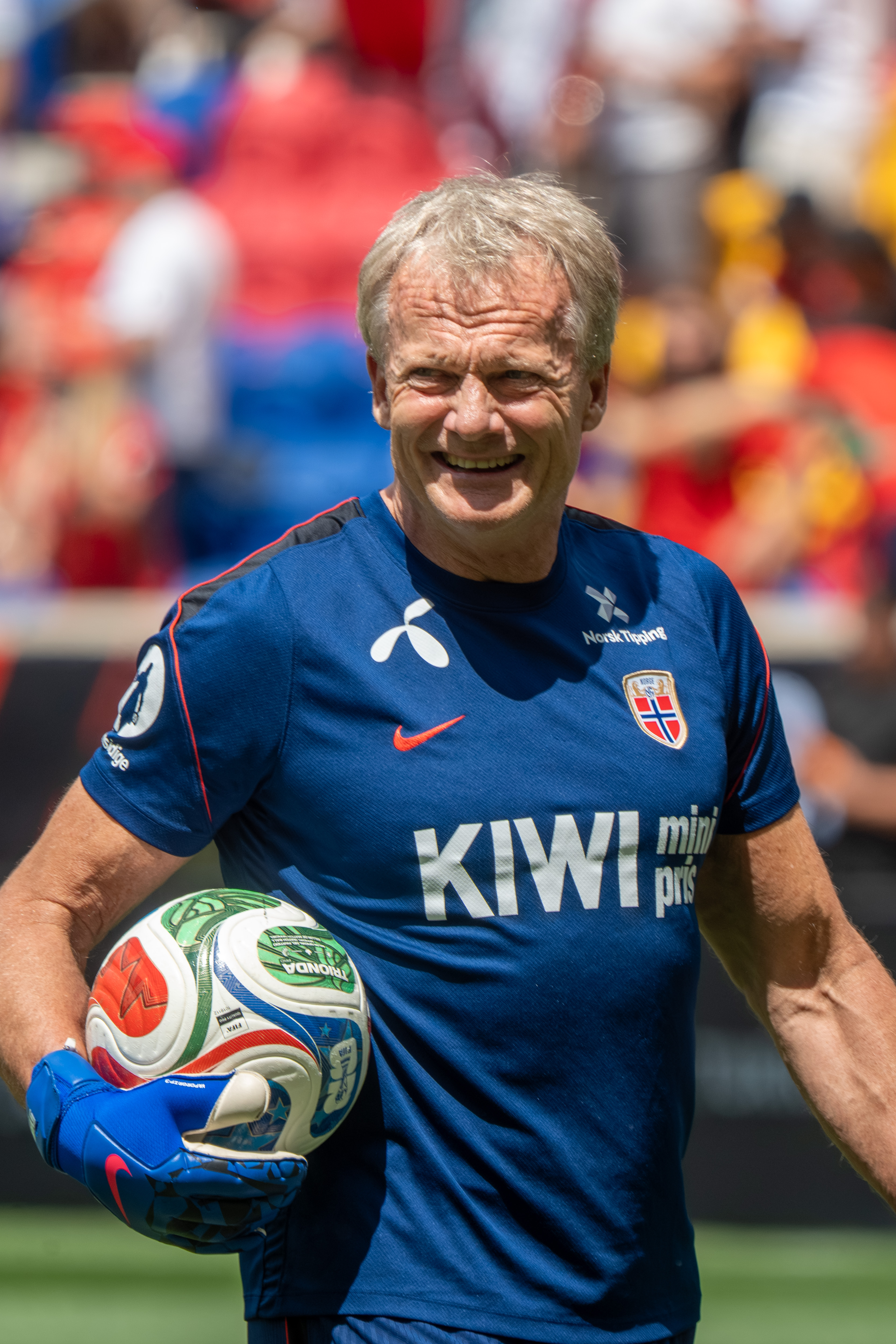
Grodås with Norway in 2026

He has education from the Norwegian School of Sport Sciences. After retiring as a player, Grodås received the highest level of football coach education in Norway and took over HamKam from 1 December 2005. However, Grodås couldn't deliver the results, and Ham-Kam was relegated. Grodås was fired on 7 November 2006.

In December 2006, Grodås signed a three-year contract with Lillestrøm as a goalkeeper-coach. Grodås is then back in what he regards as his home club. He has also acted as the third-choice goalkeeper for the club. In June 2007 Lillestrøm's first-choice goalkeeper Heinz Müller received a two match suspension after hitting Geir Ludvig Fevang with his left knee. As a result of this, Grodås sat on the substitute bench as backup goalie during the Tippeliga-match against Sandefjord later that month. He returned to the bench in August 2007 after an injury to Müller.

After Lillestrøm manager Tom Nordlie had resigned on 29 May 2008, Grodås stepped in as caretaker together with former Chelsea teammate Erland Johnsen.

In 2010, Grodås ended his term with Lillestrøm in a mutual agreement and took over as goalkeeper-coach for the Norwegian national team. On 8 January 2024, Grodås signed a short contract with Danish Superliga club AGF until the summer of 2024. He would continue to fulfill his position on the Norwegian national team at the same time.

== Personal life ==
Grodås' son, Victor Grodås, is also a footballer, playing for Hødd from Ulsteinvik.

== Career statistics ==
=== Club ===
Appearances and goals by club, season and competition
Season	Club	League			National cup (Note: Includes Norwegian Cup, FA Cup, DFB-Pokal, Copa del Rey.)		League cup (Note: Includes League Cup, DFB-Ligapokal.)		Europe		Other		Total	
Season	Club	Division	Apps	Goals	Apps	Goals	Apps	Goals	Apps	Goals	Apps	Goals	Apps	Goals
Lillestrøm	1986	1. divisjon	0	0	0	0	–		0	0	–		0	0
Lillestrøm	1987	1. divisjon	0	0	0	0	–		0	0	–		0	0
Lillestrøm	1988	1. divisjon	22	0	3	0	–		–		–		25	0
Lillestrøm	1989	1. divisjon	22	0	6	0	–		2	0	–		30	0
Lillestrøm	1990	1. divisjon	7	0	2	0	–		0	0	0 (Note: League play-offs)	0	9	0
Lillestrøm	1991	Tippeligaen	22	1	6	0	–		–		–		28	1
Lillestrøm	1992	Tippeligaen	22	0	7	0	–		–		–		29	0
Lillestrøm	1993	Tippeligaen	19	0	4	0	–		4	0	–		27	0
Lillestrøm	1994	Tippeligaen	22	0	3	0	–		4	0	–		29	0
Lillestrøm	1995	Tippeligaen	25	0	7	0	–		4	0	–		36	0
Lillestrøm	1996	Tippeligaen	21	0	3	0	–		3	0	–		27	0
Lillestrøm	Total		182	1	41	0	0	0	17	0	0	0	240	1
Chelsea	1996–97	Premier League	21	0	5	0	1	0	–		–		27	0
Chelsea	1997–98	Premier League	0	0	0	0	0	0	0	0	–		0	0
Chelsea	Total		21	0	5	0	1	0	0	0	0	0	27	0
Tottenham Hotspur	1997–98	Premier League	0	0	0	0	0	0	–		–		0	0
Schalke 04	1998–99	Bundesliga	2	0	1	0	1	0	0	0	–		4	0
Schalke 04	1999–2000	Bundesliga	0	0	0	0	0	0	–		–		0	0
Schalke 04	2000–01	Bundesliga	1	0	0	0	0	0	–		–		1	0
Schalke 04	2001–02	Bundesliga	0	0	0	0	1	0	0	0	–		1	0
Schalke 04	Total		3	0	1	0	2	0	0	0	0	0	6	0
Racing Santander (loan)	1998–99	La Liga	6	0	0	0	–		–		–		6	0
Hønefoss	2002	1. divisjon	19	0	1	0	–		–		–		20	0
Hønefoss	2003	1. divisjon	30	0	3	0	–		–		–		33	0
Hønefoss	Total		49	0	4	0	0	0	0	0	0	0	53	0
Career total			322	1	51	0	3	0	17	0	0	0	393	1

=== International ===
Appearances and goals by national team and year
National team	Year	Apps	Goals
Norway	1991	1	0
Norway	1992	6	0
Norway	1993	2	0
Norway	1994	6	0
Norway	1995	5	0
Norway	1996	7	0
Norway	1997	8	0
Norway	1998	12	0
Norway	1999	1	0
Norway	2000	0	0
Norway	2001	0	0
Norway	2002	2	0
Total		50	0

== Honours ==
Lillestrøm

- 1. divisjon: 1989
- Norwegian Football Cup runner-up: 1992

Chelsea

- FA Cup: 1996–97

Schalke 04

- DFB-Pokal: 2000–01, 2001–02
- DFB-Ligapokal runner-up: 2001

Individual

- Kniksen Award Goalkeeper of the Year: 1991, 1993
- VG Goalkeeper of the Year: 1993
- Romerikes Blad Athlete of the Year: 1993
