= Kåre Ingebrigtsen =

Norwegian footballer and manager (born 1965)

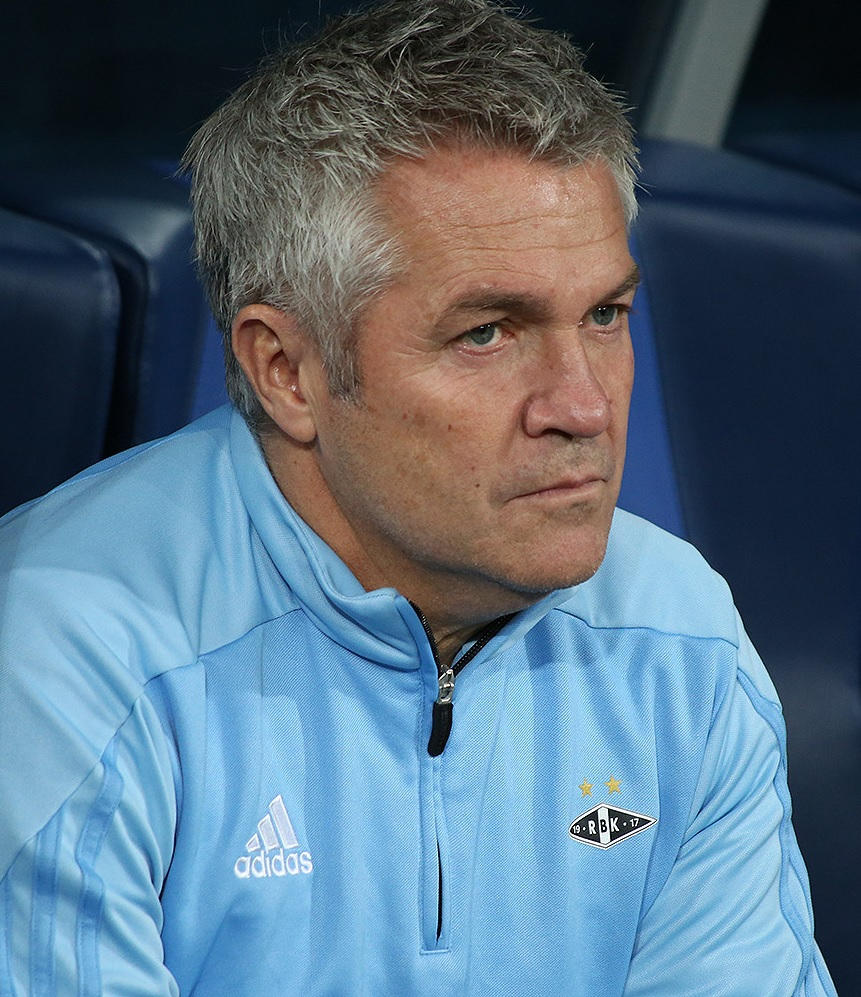
- Ingebrigtsen managing Rosenborg in 2017

Personal information
- Full name: Kåre Hedley Ingebrigtsen
- Date of birth: 11 November 1965 (age 61)
- Place of birth: Trondheim, Norway
- Position: Midfielder

Youth career
- –1984: Utleira
- 1984: Malvik

Senior career*
Years	Team	Apps	(Gls)
1985–1992	Rosenborg	141	(16)
1987	→ Frigg (loan)		
1992–1994	Manchester City	15	(3)
1993	→ Rosenborg (loan)	8	(1)
1994	→ Strømsgodset (loan)	6	(0)
1994–1995	Lillestrøm	34	(9)
1996	Rosenborg	5	(0)
1996	Lillestrøm	9	(0)
1997	Rosenborg	3	(0)
1999	Byåsen	1	(0)
2001	Malvik	1	(1)
Total		223	(27)

International career
1990–1995	Norway	23	(1)

Managerial career
- 2006–2007: Ranheim
- 2008–2011: Bodø/Glimt
- 2014–2018: Rosenborg
- 2019: Oostende
- 2019–2020: APOEL
- 2020–2021: Brann
- 2023–2024: Ranheim
- * Club domestic league appearances and goals

Kåre Hedley Ingebrigtsen (born 11 November 1965) is a Norwegian football manager, executive and former player, who played as a midfielder.

Ingebrigtsen was nicknamed "Bruttern" ("the brother") during his career at Rosenborg, which was coined by friend and former teammate Jahn Ivar Jakobsen.

== Club career ==
Ingebrigtsen played for Rosenborg, Lillestrøm, Manchester City, Strømsgodset, Byåsen and Malvik.

He made 15 appearances for Manchester City, scoring three goals, all of them in an FA Cup match against Leicester City on 8 January 1994.

== International career ==
Ingebrigtsen earned 23 caps for Norway. He netted on his debut on 7 November 1990 in a 3–1 friendly away victory over Tunisia.

== Managerial career ==
In December 2004, Ingebrigtsen took charge of Rosenborg youth side. He became the manager of 2. divisjon side Ranheim in September 2006, before returning to Rosenborg in October 2007, where he acted as an assistant.

=== Bodø/Glimt ===
At the end of the year, Ingebrigtsen was appointed as manager of Bodø/Glimt. He remained at the club until July 2011 when he left his post as manager due to poor results.

In April 2012, Ingebrigtsen took a short break from management to work as a car salesman. He later worked as an assistant for Viking from July 2012 until July 2014.

=== Rosenborg ===
In the summer of 2014, Rosenborg were on the look out for an interim manager after sacking Per Joar Hansen, and they turned to Ingebrigtsen.

After a poor start with three losses and only one win in his first four league matches, their form improved and they finished the season with nine wins out of ten matches in second place, thus qualifying for an UEFA Europa League qualifying spot. As a result, Ingebrigtsen was offered the managerial job on a permanent basis.

During his time at Rosenborg, Ingebrigtsen guided them to three straight league titles, two Norwegian Football Cup titles and two Norwegian Super Cup titles as well as qualifying for the group stages of the UEFA Europa League twice in three seasons.

=== Oostende ===
On 6 May 2019, Ingebrigtsen signed a two-year contract with Belgian First Division A side Oostende.

=== APOEL ===
Kåre Ingebritsen signed for APOEL 27 December 2019. He was sacked 11 February 2020.

=== Return to Norway ===
On 8 August 2020, Ingrebrigtsen was appointed manager of Brann. On 19 July 2021, he was dismissed.

On 29 October 2021, he was hired as sporting director for Åsane.

== Managerial statistics ==
As of match played 10 April 2024

Managerial record by team and tenure
Team	From	To	Record					Ref.
Team	From	To	P	W	D	L	Win %	Ref.
Ranheim	13 November 2006	24 October 2007	28	15	7	6	53.57	
Bodø/Glimt	1 January 2008	26 May 2011	100	37	25	38	37.00	
Rosenborg	21 July 2014	19 July 2018	182	116	33	33	63.74	
Oostende	6 May 2019	27 December 2019	23	6	4	13	26.09	
APOEL	28 December 2019	11 February 2020	11	5	2	4	45.45	
Brann	8 August 2020	19 July 2021	31	5	10	16	16.13	
Ranheim	11 January 2023	31 December 2024	36	15	4	17	41.67	
Total			411	199	85	127	48.42	—

== Honours ==
=== Player ===
Rosenborg

- 1. divisjon/Tippeligaen: 1988, 1990, 1992, 1993
- Norwegian Football Cup: 1988, 1990, 1992

=== Manager ===
Rosenborg

- Tippeligaen/Eliteserien: 2015, 2016, 2017
- Norwegian Football Cup: 2015, 2016
- Mesterfinalen: 2017, 2018

Individual

- Eliteserien Coach of the Year: 2017
