= Ola By Rise =

Norwegian footballer and coach (born 1960)

Personal information
- Full name: Ola By Rise
- Date of birth: 14 November 1960 (age 65)
- Place of birth: Trondheim, Norway
- Height: 1.91 m (6 ft 3 in)
- Position: Goalkeeper

Youth career
- Rosenborg

Senior career*
Years	Team	Apps	(Gls)
1977–1995	Rosenborg	349	(0)

International career
1977	Norway U16	1	(0)
1978–1979	Norway U19	8	(0)
1981	Norway U21	5	(0)
1984–1994	Norway	25	(0)
1989	Norway B	1	(0)

Managerial career
- 1998–2003: Rosenborg (assistant)
- 2004: Rosenborg
- 2006–2013: Norway (assistant)
- 2014: Aarhus GF (assistant)
- 2015: Ranheim
- * Club domestic league appearances and goals

Ola By Rise (born 14 November 1960) is a Norwegian football coach and former player who played as a goalkeeper. He played 18 seasons and 346 matches in the Eliteserien.

== Career ==
In his career as an active player, he was the goalkeeper of Rosenborg BK in Trondheim. From 1977 to 1995 he played 346 matches for Rosenborg in the Norwegian top league, which was a national record at the time he retired and until By Rise was surpassed by former teammate Roar Strand. As of January 2013, By Rise ranks 5th in this respect.

In the youth international categories, By Rise played for Norway U16, U19 and U21. He was capped 25 times for the Norwegian national team, and was in the Norwegian squad for the 1994 World Cup. He was also a member of the Norwegian team competing at the 1984 Summer Olympics in Los Angeles, California.

His 25th and last cap came mostly so he would earn the Norwegian Football Association Gold Watch. While he was the clear second-choice goalkeeper at the time, he was substituted in against England during the 1994 World Cup qualifying, with ten minutes left of the game. At the 1994 World Cup he was the third-choice goalkeeper.

By Rise was the assistant coach of Rosenborg under the head coaches Trond Sollied (1998), Nils Arne Eggen (1999–2002) and Åge Hareide (2003).

Ahead of the 2004 season, By Rise declined a proposition to become manager of Sandefjord Fotball. When Hareide quit in Rosenborg to become head coach of the Norwegian national team, By Rise became the head coach of Rosenborg in the 2004 season. Going into the 2004 season, Rosenborg had won twelve consecutive league titles. However, despite winning for a 13th consecutive season in 2004, the club had a relatively poor season by its high domestic standards, as it finished level on points and goal difference with Vålerenga, winning the title on goals scored. By Rise was therefore sacked in November 2004.

He worked for NRK radio station P1 as managing editor from 1 February 2005. On 18 July 2006, he was assigned as the new assistant coach for the Norwegian national team. In April 2014 he signed a contract for the final 4 games to try Danish team Aarhus Gymnastikforening avoid relegation.

He has also had a professional career outside football as a journalist for Adresseavisen, the regional newspaper in Trondheim.

== Career statistics ==
Club performance			League		Cup		Continental		Total	
Season	Club	League	Apps	Goals	Apps	Goals	Apps	Goals	Apps	Goals
Norway			League		Norwegian Cup		Europe		Total	
1977	Rosenborg	1. divisjon	5	0			–		5	0
1978	Rosenborg	2. divisjon	3	0			–		3	0
1979	Rosenborg	1. divisjon	21	0			–		21	0
1980	Rosenborg	1. divisjon	14	0			–		14	0
1981	Rosenborg	1. divisjon	8	0			–		8	0
1982	Rosenborg	1. divisjon	22	0			–		22	0
1983	Rosenborg	1. divisjon	22	0			–		22	0
1984	Rosenborg	1. divisjon	22	0			–		22	0
1985	Rosenborg	1. divisjon	22	0	4	0	–		26	0
1986	Rosenborg	1. divisjon	20	0	4	0	4	0	28	0
1987	Rosenborg	1. divisjon	22	0	8	0	–		30	0
1988	Rosenborg	1. divisjon	22	0	8	0	–		30	0
1989	Rosenborg	1. divisjon	22	0	5	0	2	0	29	0
1990	Rosenborg	1. divisjon	21	0	7	0	2	0	30	0
1991	Rosenborg	Tippeligaen	21	0	8	0	2	0	31	0
1992	Rosenborg	Tippeligaen	22	0	7	1	2	0	31	1
1993	Rosenborg	Tippeligaen	21	0	3	0	4	0	28	0
1994	Rosenborg	Tippeligaen	21	0	7	0	4	0	32	0
1995	Rosenborg	Tippeligaen	18	0	5	0	4	0	27	0
Total	Norway		349	0	66	1	24	0	439	1
Career total			349	0	66	1	24	0	439	1

Norway national team
Year	Apps	Goals
1984	1	0
1985	2	0
1986	6	0
1987	6	0
1988	2	0
1989	4	0
1990	2	0
1991	0	0
1992	1	0
1993	0	0
1994	1	0
Total	25	0

== Honours ==
=== Player ===
Rosenborg

- Norwegian top division (7): 1985, 1988, 1990, 1992, 1993, 1994, 1995
- Norwegian Football Cup (4): 1988, 1990, 1992, 1995

=== Coach ===
- Norwegian top division (6): 1998, 1999, 2000, 2001, 2002, 2003 (as assistant coach)
- Norwegian Football Cup (2): 1999, 2003 (as assistant coach)
- Norwegian top division: 2004 (as head coach/manager)

=== Individual ===
- Kniksen award as goalkeeper of the year: 1992
- Kniksen's honour award: 1995
