= Trond Henriksen =

Norwegian footballer and coach (born 1964)

Personal information
- Full name: Trond Børge Henriksen
- Date of birth: 28 April 1964 (age 62)
- Place of birth: Trondheim, Norway
- Position: Wingback

Youth career
- Nidelv IL

Senior career*
Years	Team	Apps	(Gls)
1983–1993	Rosenborg	193	(10)

Managerial career
- 2006–2007: Rosenborg (assistant)
- 2007–2008: Rosenborg (interim)
- 2008–2012: Rosenborg (assistant)
- 2018–2020: Rosenborg (assistant)
- 2020: Rosenborg (interim)
- 2020–2021: Rosenborg (assistant)
- 2023: Rosenborg (assistant)
- * Club domestic league appearances and goals

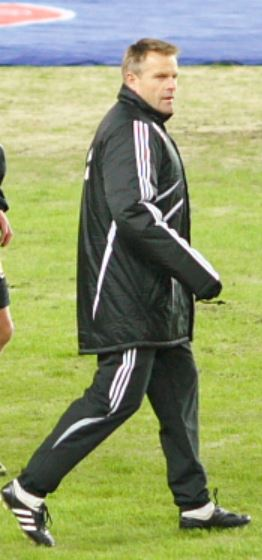
Trond Henriksen, 2009

Trond Børge Henriksen (born 28 April 1964) is a Norwegian football coach and former player. He is the father of Rosenborg BK midfielder Markus Henriksen.

== Biography ==
Trond Henriksen played in Rosenborg from 1983 to 1993 as a wingback, achieving five Norwegian Premier League championships and three Norwegian Football Cup wins. His uncompromising playing style made him a hero amongst the fans, and he was nicknamed Rambo after the movie character. He still holds the record of 29 yellow cards in Rosenborg. He worked as a postman until he became full-time coach for Rosenborg's youth team. When Knut Tørum became Rosenborg's head coach in 2006, Henriksen was promoted to assistant coach. After Knut Tørum resigned on 25 October 2007, Henriksen was promoted to head coach. He later went back to in his former position as assistant coach under head coach Jan Jönsson. In June 2020 he took on the role of caretaker manager of Rosenborg BK, a position he had until 1. September 2020.

=== Managerial Stats (all official matches) ===
As of match played 30 August 2020

Team	From	To	Record							
Team	From	To	G	W	D	L	GF	GA	GD	Win %
Rosenborg	25 October 2007	31 May 2008	14	5	1	8	19	20	−1	35.71
Rosenborg	26 June 2020	31 August 2020	14	9	3	2	31	13	+18	64.29
Total			28	14	4	10	50	33	+17	50.00

== Honours ==
Rosenborg as player

- Norwegian Premier League Championship: 1985, 1988, 1990, 1992, 1993
- Norwegian Premier League Runner up: 1989, 1991
- Norwegian Cup Win: 1988, 1990, 1992
- Norwegian Cup Runner up: 1991

Rosenborg as assistant coach

- Norwegian Premier League Championship: 2009, 2010, 2018
