= Mini Jakobsen =

Norwegian footballer (born 1965)

Personal information
- Full name: Jahn Ivar Jakobsen
- Date of birth: 8 November 1965 (age 60)
- Place of birth: Gravdal, Norway
- Height: 1.68 m (5 ft 6 in)
- Positions: Winger; forward

Youth career
- IK Junkeren
- IK Grand Bodø

Senior career*
Years	Team	Apps	(Gls)
1984–1987	FK Bodø/Glimt	80	(67)
1988–1990	Rosenborg BK	66	(43)
1990–1993	BSC Young Boys	80	(32)
1993	MSV Duisburg	2	(0)
1993–1994	Lierse S.K.	16	(1)
1994–2000	Rosenborg BK	128	(55)
Total		372	(198)

International career
1988–1998	Norway	65	(11)
- * Club domestic league appearances and goals

Jahn Ivar Jakobsen, nicknamed Mini, (born 8 November 1965) is a Norwegian former football player (winger/forward) who has played for, amongst others, Bodø/Glimt and Rosenborg.

== Club career ==
During the very early years of his career, Jakobsen played at Junkeren and Grand Bodø, two minor Norwegian clubs in the town of Bodø. Mini's actual professional career as a footballer started at the well-known Norwegian club Bodø/Glimt. When he arrived at the club, Bodø/Glimt played in the third division (the third highest division in Norway at the time), but did gain promotion in 1986. In the Norwegian second division, Bodø/Glimt finished in seventh place in 1987. At Bodø/Glimt, Jakobsen was the top scorer for four consecutive seasons: In 1984, with seven goals (third division), in 1985 with 18 goals (third), in 1986 with 26 goals (third) and in 1987 with 16 goals (second division).

In 1988, Jakobsen was transferred to Rosenborg along with teammate Ørjan Berg, and after a successful season – winning the Norwegian double and becoming the league's top scorer – he got his first cap for Norway. At Rosenborg he became well known as a high quality winger/striker.

After the Norwegian 1990 season, Jakobsen was transferred from Rosenborg to the Swiss club BSC Young Boys, and during the next four years he played for several different European clubs in Switzerland, Germany and Belgium.

In 1994, Jakobsen returned to Rosenborg, and became a part of Rosenborg's better than expected performances in UEFA Champions League tournament. He then played for Norway in the 1998 World Cup, where they made the second round.

Jakobsen successfully ended his professional career at Rosenborg by winning the Norwegian double in 1999. He is now working as a sports reporter at the Norwegian TV channel TV 2.

== Personal life ==
In his youth, Jakobsen changed his name from Jan Ivar to Jahn Ivar. He later stated that he changed his name because his idol, Norwegian singer Jahn Teigen, wrote his first name with an h.

== Career statistics ==
As of 12 January 2015

Season	Club	Division	League		National Cup		League Cup		Europe		Total	
Season	Club	Division	Apps	Goals	Apps	Goals	Apps	Goals	Apps	Goals	Apps	Goals
1988	Rosenborg	1. Divisjon	22	8	0	0	—		—		22	8
1989	Rosenborg	1. Divisjon	22	18	0	0	—		—		22	18
1990	Rosenborg	Tippeligaen	22	17	1	1	—		—		23	18
1990-91	Young Boys	Super League	21	7	0	0	—		—		21	7
1991-92	Young Boys	Super League	32	9	0	0	—		—		32	9
1992-93	Young Boys	Super League	27	16	0	0	—		—		27	16
1993-94	Duisburg	Bundesliga	2	0	0	0	—		—		2	0
1993-94	Lierse	Jupiler League	16	1	0	0	—		—		16	1
1994	Rosenborg	Tippeligaen	5	2	0	0	—		—		5	2
1995	Rosenborg	Tippeligaen	25	10	0	0	—		—		25	10
1996	Rosenborg	Tippeligaen	25	15	0	0	—		—		25	15
1997	Rosenborg	Tippeligaen	26	12	0	0	—		—		26	12
1998	Rosenborg	Tippeligaen	26	14	0	0	—		—		26	14
1999	Rosenborg	Tippeligaen	21	2	4	3	—		—		25	5
Career Total			292	131	5	4	0	0	0	0	297	135

== Honours ==
=== Club ===
Rosenborg

- Norwegian top division: 1988, 1990, 1995, 1996, 1997, 1998, 1999
- Norwegian Cup: 1988, 1990, 1995, 1999

=== Individual ===
- Norwegian top division top scorer: 1989
