= Bjørn Hansen (footballer) =

Norwegian footballer and manager (1939–2018)

Bjørn Hansen (15 January 1939 – 25 April 2018) was a Norwegian football player and coach. Hansen was head coach for Rosenborg BK in part of the 1985 season and assistant coach 1988-89 and 1991–96. The club dominated Norwegian football at this time, winning the premier league most seasons, as well as the Norwegian cup in several of them. He was also assistant coach for Norwegian national team from 1994 to 1998, including at the 1998 FIFA World Cup.

== Career ==
Born in Trondheim, Hansen played soccer as a midfielder for FK Kvik in the 1960s. He played for the club when they were promoted to 2.divisjon which was Norway's second highest level at the time and subsequently played for the club in that division. He also played a couple of matches for Sandefjord BK in 1.divisjon, the highest level. In addition he played for Oppdal.

Educated as a teacher and working in school, he started coaching teams after his active playing career, including local Trøndelag clubs like Stjørdals-Blink og Strindheim. During his career he also coached Flatås, the Norwegian U15, U16, U17, U18, U19 and teams.

In 1984, he was hired as coach for Rosenborg BK in Trondheim which played at the highest level. The club finished sixth in the serie and reached a quarter-final in the Norwegian Football Cup. The next season, Rosenborg was fighting for the championship when Hansen resigned in August 1985 after feeling he did not manage to motivate the players enough. The club won the championship in October that year with Arne Dokken as temporary coach.

After this, he was out of RBK for a couple of seasons, but came back as assistant coach to Nils Arne Eggen in 1988. His main focus was on defense. This was the start of the most successful time in Rosenborg's history. Under Eggen and Hansen, the club won both the serie and cup in 1988 and followed up by placing second in the serie in 1989. Hansen has a pause when the club repeated the double in 1990, but came back for the 1992 season when the club again took the double. Hansen continued to 1996 and the club won the championship all these years, and in 1995 also won the cup.

In 1994, Hansen also started as assistant coach to Egil "Drillo" Olsen for the Norwegian national team. Under Olsen and Hansen the team qualified for the 1998 FIFA World Cup and as assistant coach Hansen was part of Norway's victory over Brazil in the group play. The team lost against Italy in round of 16.

He thereafter worked two years from 1998 to 2000 coaching the U21 as well as working with developing player skills for RBK.

He also led player development nationally in Norway for several years, traveling much around the country.

In 2005, he again worked as coach for Rosenborg, in the spring as consultant for Per Joar Hansen og Rune Skarsfjord and in the autumn as assistant coach to Per-Mathias Høgmo. The club was struggling in the serie that season, but managed to avoid demotion.

== Death and legacy ==
As a person and coach, Hansen was described by players and co-workers as calm, patient, sensible and good with people. Coach and football expert Lars Tjærnås described Hansen as his best mentor.

In 2017, he was ranked as Norway's 25th most important male soccer coach through all times by Knut Espen Svegaarden in Verdens Gang.

Hansen went through heart surgery in 1997 after a heart attack. He was diagnosed with cancer for the first time in 2002. He died on 25 April 2018 at the age of 79.

Rosenborg players will play with black armbands in his honour in the match against Lillestrøm on 26 April 2018.
