= Per-Mathias Høgmo =

Norwegian footballer and manager (born 1959)

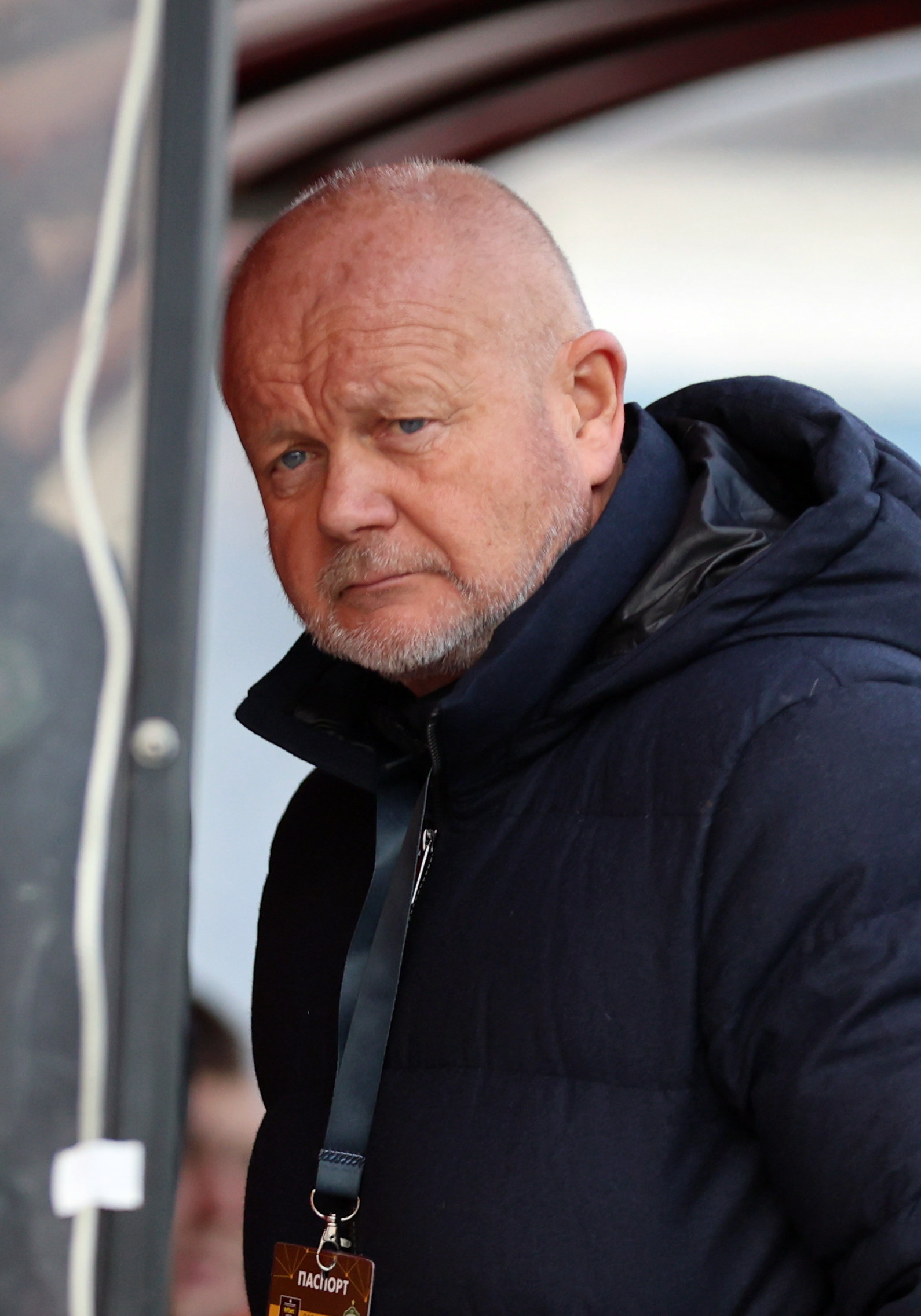
- Per-Mathias Høgmo in 2026 with Ludogorets Razgrad

Personal information
- Full name: Per-Mathias Høgmo
- Date of birth: 1 December 1959 (age 66)
- Place of birth: Tromsø, Norway
- Position: Midfielder

Senior career*
Years	Team	Apps	(Gls)
1977	Gratangen		
1978–1983	Mjølner		
1984–1985	Tromsø	42	(15)
1985–1986	Norrköping	2	(0)
1986–1989	Tromsø	40	(7)
1989	Gratangen		
1991	Tromsø	1	(0)

International career
1986	Norway U21	1	(0)
1991	Sápmi	1	(0)

Managerial career
- 1989: Gratangen (playing manager)
- 1990–1991: Tromsdalen
- 1992: Tromsø
- 1993–1994: Fossum
- 1993: Norway U-19
- 1994: Norway U-15
- 1995: Norway U-16
- 1995–1996: Moss FK
- 1996: Norway U-17
- 1997–2000: Norway (women)
- 2000–2003: Norway U-21
- 2004: Tromsø
- 2005–2006: Rosenborg
- 2008–2012: Tromsø
- 2013: Djurgården
- 2013–2016: Norway
- 2017–2018: Fredrikstad
- 2021–2023: Häcken
- 2024: Urawa Red Diamonds
- 2025: Molde
- 2025–2026: Ludogorets Razgrad
- * Club domestic league appearances and goals

Per-Mathias Høgmo (born 1 December 1959) is a Norwegian football manager and former player.

He has previously been head coach of Norway women's national football team and the Tippeligaen sides Tromsø, Moss and Rosenborg. While being head coach of Tromsø he was working on a PhD in football at the university in Tromsø.

== Club career ==
Høgmo grew up in Gratangen Municipality, a small community in southern Troms county, and began his football career as a midfielder for his local club Gratangen. In 1978, he joined Mjølner, the biggest club in his home region, and spent six seasons with the Narvik side where he made around 210 appearances before moving to Tromsø in 1984, where he joined Tromsø, and spent the rest of his top-level playing career with the exception of a short spell with Swedish team Norrköping in 1985–86. He played for Tromsø until 1988 season, and was a member of the TIL team that won the Norwegian Cup in 1986.

== International career ==
He played one match for Norway U21, which was the last 15 minutes as a substitute for Vegard Skogheim, in a match against Switzerland U23 on 8 November 1986.

He also represented Sápmi internationally, and he debuted on 6 July 1991 during the 2–1 victory against Estonia.

== Managerial career ==
Høgmo started his coaching career in Gratangen where he served as playing manager in the 1989-season. Following this spell, he served two years in Tromsdalen before moving to Tromsø for the 1992-season.

In 1997, Høgmo moved to coaching the women's national football team. In this role, Høgmo achieved considerable success by leading the team to a fourth place in the World Cup of 1999, and a gold medal in the 2000 Sydney Olympics. Between 2000 and 2003, he was hired by national federation to coach the national U21 team. Following this spell, Høgmo returned to Tromsø for his second spell at the club. Høgmo spent the 2004 season at Tromsø, taking the team to a fourth place in the league, and qualifying them for Royal League.. By achieving success with Tromsø, Høgmo attracted interest from other clubs, however, and in August, 2005, he was signed by Rosenborg to replace Per Joar Hansen. Rosenborg had suffered a tremendously bad start of the season and were closer to the relegation struggle than to the top of the league. Høgmo turned the team around, however, and took the team to a seventh place in the league.

The next season was more difficult for Høgmo. After the team suffered from a slow start of the season, Høgmo took out sick leave and left the club in incertainty. Høgmo's assistant, Knut Tørum, meanwhile did his things well in the club and in October 2006, Høgmo resigned from his position as manager, and said he would withdraw from football to pursue a new career.

Høgmo's stint away from football would last only two years. In 2008, he was signed by Tromsø for the third time, replacing Steinar Nilsen. In his first season at the club, Høgmo took the team to the third spot in the league - improving the team's sixth spot finish in the 2007-season. The 2009-season was slightly more difficult for Høgmo and Tromsø, but the team nevertheless finished sixth in the league. In 2010, success continued for Høgmo when he took the team to the top of the league at the start of the season. Despite slowing off a little after the summer break, Tromsø nevertheless confirmed their status as one of the best teams in the Norwegian Premier League that season.

On 27 September 2013, Per Mathias Høgmo replaced Egil Olsen as coach of Norway. Olsen agreed to stand down following the World Cup qualifying defeat at home to Switzerland. On 16 November 2016, Høgmo quit after three years in charge.

== Career statistics ==
=== International ===
Appearances and goals by national team and year
National team	Year	Apps	Goals
Sápmi	1991	1	0
Total		1	0

== Managerial statistics (all official matches) ==
As of match played 25 May 2026

Team	Nat	From	To	Record				
Team	Nat	From	To	G	W	D	L	Win %
Tromsø	(Norway)	1 January 2009	31 December 2012	120	53	33	34	44.17
Djurgården	(Sweden)	15 May 2013	31 December 2013	22	11	7	4	50.00
Norway	(Norway)	27 September 2013	16 November 2016	35	10	7	18	28.57
Fredrikstad	(Norway)	1 December 2017	17 December 2018	26	15	7	4	57.69
Häcken	(Sweden)	12 June 2021	8 December 2023	109	60	22	27	55.05
Urawa Red Diamonds	(Japan)	8 December 2023	27 August 2024	28	10	8	10	35.71
Molde	(Norway)	9 January 2025	14 September 2025	29	12	4	13	41.38
Ludogorets Razgrad	(Bulgaria)	21 November 2025	25 May 2026	33	19	6	8	57.58
Total				402	190	94	118	47.26
