= Per Joar Hansen =

Norwegian football coach (born 1965)

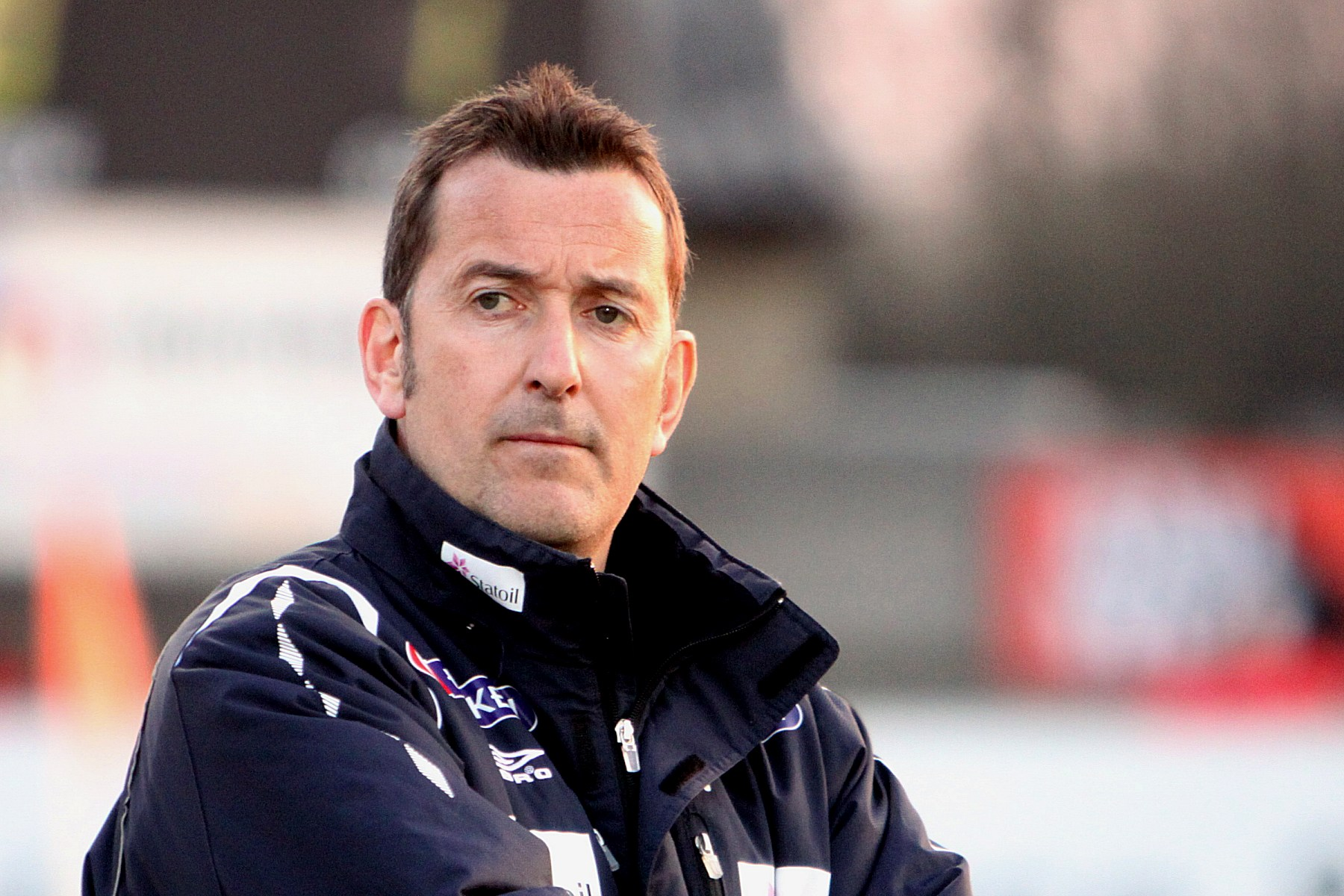

Personal information
- Full name: Per Joar Hansen
- Date of birth: 17 August 1965 (age 61)
- Place of birth: Namsos, Norway

Senior career*
Years	Team	Apps	(Gls)
- Mosjøen IL
- Steinkjer FK
- Rosenborg
- Umeå FC
–1994	Stjørdals-Blink		
1995	Strindheim IL		
1996–	Ranheim IL		
- Byåsen IL
- Fram Skatval
- Varden

Managerial career
- 1995: Strindheim IL (player-manager)
- 1999–2000: Byåsen IL
- 2001: Varden
- 2001–2003: GIF Sundsvall
- 2004–2005: Rosenborg
- 2007: Aalesunds FK
- 2008: GIF Sundsvall
- 2009–2010: Ranheim
- 2011–2012: Norway U21
- 2013–2014: Rosenborg
- 2017–2020: Norway (assistant)
- 2021–2022: Östersund
- 2026–: GIF Sundsvall
- * Club domestic league appearances and goals

Per Joar Hansen (born 17 August 1965) is a Norwegian football coach. He grew up in the small community of Trofors in Nordland. He played for and managed Rosenborg BK, and he has managed GIF Sundsvall, Aalesunds FK, Ranheim and the Norwegian under-21 football team.

== Club career ==
Known by the nickname "Perry", he began his career in the lower flight clubs of Mosjøen IL and Steinkjer FK, before enjoying a brief spell at Rosenborg from 1987 to 1989. He contributed to Rosenborg winning The Double in 1988. He then went on to play in lower divisions for Umeå FC, Stjørdals-Blink, Strindheim IL (first tier in 1995), Byåsen IL, Fram Skatval, and actually serving as player-manager from 1995 in Strindheim, Byåsen and Varden.

== Managerial career ==
From the late 1990s "Perry" first joined the coaching staff of Rosenborg, but went on to Swedish top flight club GIF Sundsvall in the autumn of 2001 where he enjoyed great success in his first season.

After just avoiding relegation in 2003, he resigned from the club and returned to Rosenborg, turning down the job as manager of Swedish champions Djurgården of Stockholm. He was assistant manager to Ola By Rise during the not too impressive 2004 season, and he was appointed manager going into the historic start of the Royal League, which was not a successful competition of Scandinavian football.

Considered by the press as only the third best man for the position, he led Rosenborg into a difficult reconstruction process, seeing the stem of the team closing in on retirement from professional football. Halfway into the 2005 season, he resigned after a string of bad results, and was immediately replaced by Per-Mathias Høgmo.

Hansen signed a two-year contract with the Adeccoligaen club Aalesunds FK on 6 December 2006. Aalesunds got promoted to Tippeligaen the following year. He left Aalesunds and returned to GIF Sundsvall in December 2007. He was the manager there until 2 October 2008, when he got fired. From the 2009 season, he coached Ranheim Fotball in the Adeccoligaen. During the 2010 season, he was head of a coaching team including Otto Ulseth and Christer Basma.

He began 2011 managing the Norway national under-21 football team. On 16 October 2012, the team qualified for the UEFA European Under-21 Championship with an astonishing 5–4 aggregate win over France. His assistant manager Tor Ole Skullerud led the team to the semi-finals, as he returned to Rosenborg for his second spell as manager of the club.

In September 2021, Hansen was hired by Swedish club Östersunds FK. He left it at the end of the year, as the club only gained 5 points in 13 games under his helm and was relegated from the top-tier Allsvenskan.

=== Managerial statistics ===
As of 7 November 2026

Team	From	To	Record							
Team	From	To	G	W	D	L	GF	GA	GD	Win %
Sundsvall	12 November 2001	31 October 2003	52	11	19	22	54	78	−24	21.15
Rosenborg	1 January 2005	7 August 2005	17	6	3	8	29	25	+4	35.29
Aalesund	1 January 2007	30 November 2007	26	9	3	14	40	56	−16	34.62
Sundsvall	1 January 2008	2 October 2008	24	4	6	14	20	39	−19	16.67
Ranheim	1 January 2009	6 December 2010	54	29	11	14	101	59	+42	53.70
Norway U21	8 December 2010	14 December 2012	17	6	4	7	25	27	−2	35.29
Rosenborg	14 December 2012	21 July 2014	66	39	17	10	149	71	+78	59.09
Östersund	2 September 2021	31 December 2021	13	1	2	10	8	29	−21	7.69
Sundsvall	7 July 2026	Present	17	3	1	13	10	41	−31	17.65
Total			286	108	66	112	436	425	+11	37.76
