= Rosenborg BK =

Association football club in Trondheim, Norway

Coordinates: 63°24′41″N 10°24′8″E

Rosenborg
- Full name: Rosenborg Ballklub
- Nicknames: Troillongan (The Troll Children)
- Founded: 19 May 1917; 109 years ago (as Odd)
- Ground: Lerkendal Stadion; Trondheim
- Capacity: 21,426
- Chairman: Odd Einar Landsem
- Head coach: Freyr Alexandersson
- League: Eliteserien
- 2025: Eliteserien, 7th of 16
- Website: www.rbk.no
Home colours	Away colours	Third colours

Rosenborg Ballklub, commonly referred to simply as Rosenborg (Urban East Norwegian: [ˈrùːsn̩bɔrɡ]) or RBK, is a Norwegian professional football club from Trondheim that plays in Eliteserien. The club has won a record 26 league titles, a shared record 12 Norwegian Football Cup titles and have played more UEFA matches than any other Norwegian team. RBK play their home games at the all-seater Lerkendal Stadion which has a capacity of 21,421.

The club was founded as Odd in 1917 but were not allowed to play amateur league matches until 1928, when they took the present name. They reached the League of Norway in 1937–38, but were relegated to lower divisions during the 1940s. The club moved to Lerkendal in 1957 and their first title was the 1960 Cup, resulting in their first participation in a UEFA tournament. It was not until the 1960s that RBK was established as Trondheim's leading football team. In 1967 RBK was promoted to the top league where they, except for the 1978 season, have remained ever since. They won three league titles between 1967 and 1971. The club's golden era started with the 1985 league title. From 1991 through 2004 the team won 13 consecutive titles, 10 under manager Nils Arne Eggen. During this period, they also participated in the group stage of Champions League 11 times, reaching the quarter-finals in 1996–97.

Rosenborg are nicknamed Troillongan ("The Troll Children") and have played in white shirts and black shorts for most of their history. Their longest-standing and fiercest rivalry is with Molde.

== History ==
=== Early years (1917–1959) ===
On 19 May 1917, 12 young men from Rosenborg in Trondheim founded Sportsklubben Odd. The name Odd was a tribute to Odd of Skien, the most successful team in Norway at the time. Odd spent their first few years playing against other local teams before attempting to join the regional series in 1920. As with most of the "buddy" clubs formed at the time, they were repeatedly denied access. Since many of these players also played for the bigger teams, the authorities feared a possible shortage of players if too many small clubs were let in. As the years went by, disillusioned players began leaving the club, and in 1923 the first team played only a single match.

By 1926, management of the club had passed on to a new generation of members, and it was through their efforts that Odd were finally admitted into the regional series in 1927, ten years after the club was founded. A year later they were set for entry into the Football Association of Norway, but their entry was blocked as the association refused to have two member clubs with the same name. The club therefore took on its current name, Rosenborg Ballklub, on 26 October 1928. Rosenborg is a mainly residential area in Trondheim.

Rosenborg enjoyed little success at first, moving constantly between the lower divisions of the regional series. Yet their performance was improving and in 1931 the team qualified for the highest level, and one year later they played in the Norwegian Cup for the first time. It was also at this time that Rosenborg started planning for a new home ground at Lerkendal, although this project was not completed until after World War II.

=== The breakthrough (1960–1968) ===
Rosenborg's youth team has been one of the best in the country ever since the club was founded and an especially talented generation of youth players during the 1950s would grow up to form the basis for the first team's success in the 1960s and onwards. In 1960 Rosenborg progressed all the way to the cup final where they faced Odd, the team from which they had adopted their original name and colours from in 1917. It took a rematch to decide the winner, but Rosenborg were able to claim their first trophy. Rosenborg won the cup again in 1964.

Rosenborg was promoted from the regional league to group A of the main Norwegian league in 1960. The following season the two groups of the top flight were combined into a single league of 16 teams with the teams finishing in the bottom half being relegated to the 2nd division. Rosenborg finished as number 9 out of the 16 teams and was relegated to the new 2nd division where they played from 1963 until they won promotion by winning group B in 1966.

In 1967 Rosenborg was promoted to the highest level in Norwegian football, the Main League (later the 1st Division) for the first time. This would prove to be a highly successful year for the club. Led on by such players as Harald Sunde, Nils Arne Eggen, and the talented young forward Odd Iversen, Rosenborg won their first league title. Iversen scored 17 goals in 18 matches that year, and would go on to score a massive 30 goals in the following season, although he alone could not prevent Rosenborg from being beaten to the title by Lyn. By the end of the 1960s it was clear that Rosenborg had emerged as one of Norway's leading football clubs.

The 1960s saw Rosenborg venture onto the European stage for the first time. As winners of the cup in 1964, the club debuted in the Cup Winners' Cup the following year. Three years later, Rosenborg entered the European Cup as winners of the league.

=== Ups and downs (1969–1987) ===
Rosenborg hired Englishman George Curtis as coach ahead of the 1969 season. Curtis introduced the new 4–4–2 formation and shifted focus towards tactics and organization rather than all-out attacking football. This move worked well to begin with, as Rosenborg were crowned league winners for the third time. However, when both Odd Iversen and Harald Sunde left the club, Rosenborg virtually stopped scoring goals and failed to win again in 1970. Curtis was criticized for being too defensively minded and was replaced by recently retired player Nils Arne Eggen, who reverted to a more crowd-pleasing style of play. Eggen's first of five tenures as coach was a resounding success; Rosenborg won The Double.

The 1971 Double marked the end of the club's first golden age. Rosenborg lost the cup final two consecutive seasons and began to struggle in the league. A flurry of coaches (including Eggen) came and went without making an impact and in 1977 the team won only one match the entire season, finishing dead last.

Nils Arne Eggen was then called in for his third tenure, from 1978 to 1982, and with the return of the now 35-year-old Odd Iversen, Rosenborg climbed back into the 1st Division the following year. In 1979, Iversen became top goalscorer for the fourth time in his career, but by the time he had retired in 1982, the club had still not regained its former glory. That would finally happen in 1985 when, after 14 trophyless years, Rosenborg defeated Lillestrøm in the final match of the season to win the league by a single point.

=== Domination, The Nils Arne Eggen Era (1988–2002) ===
The year 1985 may have been a turning point in Rosenborg's fortunes, but it was in 1988 that things really started to happen. The club received fresh capital from its new main sponsor and was fully professionalized. Nils Arne Eggen returned to Trondheim to once again become head coach, this after leading Moss to the league title in 1987. In the waning years of the 1980s, the club secured Doubles twice (1988 and 1990).

Rosenborg went on to dominate Norwegian club football throughout the 1990s. In strong contrast to the Norwegian national team's defensive and often criticized (yet highly effective) style of play at the time, Rosenborg achieved success through strict adherence to crowd-pleasing, attacking football. The Norwegian Premier League, established in 1991, was won 13 consecutive seasons from 1992. The Norwegian Cup was won five times.

In 1995, Rosenborg qualified for the UEFA Champions League for the first time, strengthening the club's financial position. Revenue from subsequent European campaigns made Rosenborg Norway's wealthiest club. The club's ability to offer higher salaries and European competition helped attract top players, contributing to continued domestic success. During this period, few clubs sustained competitive challenges for extended periods.

=== European adventures ===
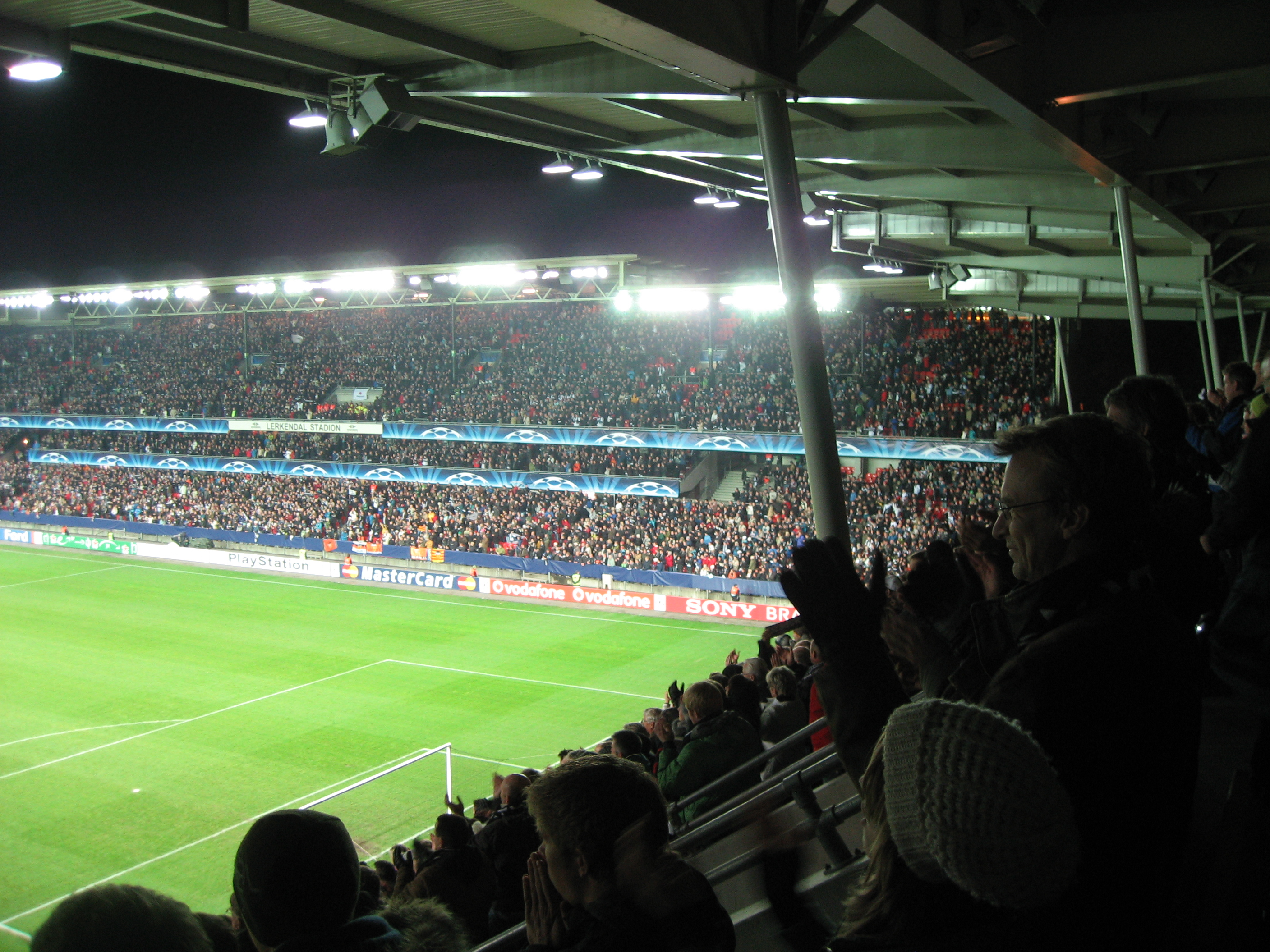
Rosenborg vs Valencia

Rosenborg participated in the group phase of the Champions League 11 times in the 13 years between 1995 and 2007. Eight of them were consecutive (from 1995 to 2002), which was a record until 2004, when Manchester United qualified for the group phase for a ninth successive year.

Rosenborg have on two occasions managed to progress beyond the first group stage of the Champions League. In the 1996–97 season, they were heading for an early exit, but with Milan squandering valuable points, the stage was set for a deciding match at San Siro. Rosenborg defeated Milan 2–1, ousting the Italians and putting themselves in the quarter-finals, where they lost 3–1 on aggregate against Juventus. In the 1999–2000 season, Rosenborg won their group to secure a place in the second group stage. The most memorable game was away against Borussia Dortmund, who were defeated 3–0.

Other highlights include the 2–0 win against Real Madrid and a 5–1 victory over Olympiacos, both in the 1997–98 season. There have also been some dismal performances, particularly against French teams. Rosenborg lost 0–5 to Lyon in 2002 and were crushed 2–7 by Paris Saint-Germain in 2000.

The Norwegians failed to qualify in 2003, losing out to Deportivo La Coruña, but managed to qualify again in 2004 after beating Maccabi Haifa, and in 2005 – despite the disappointing season – they qualified for the tenth time after winning 4–3 against Steaua București.

Rosenborg managed to qualify for the 11th time in 2007. The club impressed with a 1–1 draw away against Chelsea and beating Valencia 2–0 both home and away.

In July 2009, Rosenborg was eliminated from the UEFA Europa League in the second qualifying round against Qarabag of Azerbaijan. A year later, in August 2010, Rosenborg were eliminated in the UEFA Champions League in the play-off round, after a 2–2 draw against Danish side Copenhagen, with Copenhagen qualifying due to the away goals rule.

=== Consolidation (2003) ===
At the end of 2002, Rosenborg saw the retirement of Nils Arne Eggen after many successful years, during which he was only relieved once, in the 1998 season, by his assistant, Trond Sollied. Eggen was replaced by Åge Hareide, who had previously led both Helsingborg and Brøndby to championships in their respective leagues.

Hareide asserted that in order to not only stay ahead at the domestic level, but also perform better at the European level, Rosenborg would have to become more cynical and focus more on defensive skill, while still maintaining the offensive play that had made the team so strong in the first place. The new manager also highlighted the need to renew the aging squad, whose continuity had been another key to the club's success; many of the players had been in the club since the start of the 1990s. In a controversial move, Hareide began this process by releasing the popular Bent Skammelsrud, who subsequently retired.

Under new leadership, Rosenborg laid waste to the league, losing only three games and winning 14 points ahead of runners-up Bodø/Glimt. The club claimed its seventh successive Double, again defeating Bodø/Glimt in the cup final. Despite failing to qualify for the Champions League, Rosenborg had enjoyed another great season and it looked like Hareide's beginning reforms were paying off; but, 2003 turned out to be his one and only season at the club, as he accepted an offer to lead the Norwegian national team in December of that year. He was replaced by his assistant Ola By Rise, a notable former goalkeeper and goalkeeping coach at the club.

=== Troubled times (2004–2005) ===
With Hareide's unexpected departure at the end of 2003 the club failed to properly execute the reforms he had begun. It also became clear that with the increased flow of capital into Norwegian football, some clubs were finally beginning to perform at a more consistent level close, or even equal, to that of Rosenborg. Rosenborg were no longer able to dominate every match, instead taking on the appearance of a team fed up with success.

Rosenborg were league winners again in 2004 but it was only through more goals scored that they were able to claim the title. Ola By Rise's contract was terminated in October, even though he succeeded in leading the team to the Champions League, and for some time it was uncertain who would take over. In November, the club announced the return of Nils Arne Eggen as an advisor to former assistant manager, Per Joar Hansen, who was promoted to manager. Bjørn Hansen and Rune Skarsfjord would also act as assistant managers.

The scheme proved so unsuccessful that Rosenborg's 2005 season was for the most part a disaster. The club battled to avoid falling into the relegation zone for much of the season; Eggen left his role midways, and Per Joar Hansen left in August. Per-Mathias Høgmo followed Hansen as the club's manager immediately after his departure. His first months were marred by a series of embarrassing losses and an early exit from the cup, but with a late-season return to form the team held on to its place in the top flight and finishing third in the Champions League Group Stage, qualifying them for the UEFA Cup.

=== Turbulence (2006–2012) ===
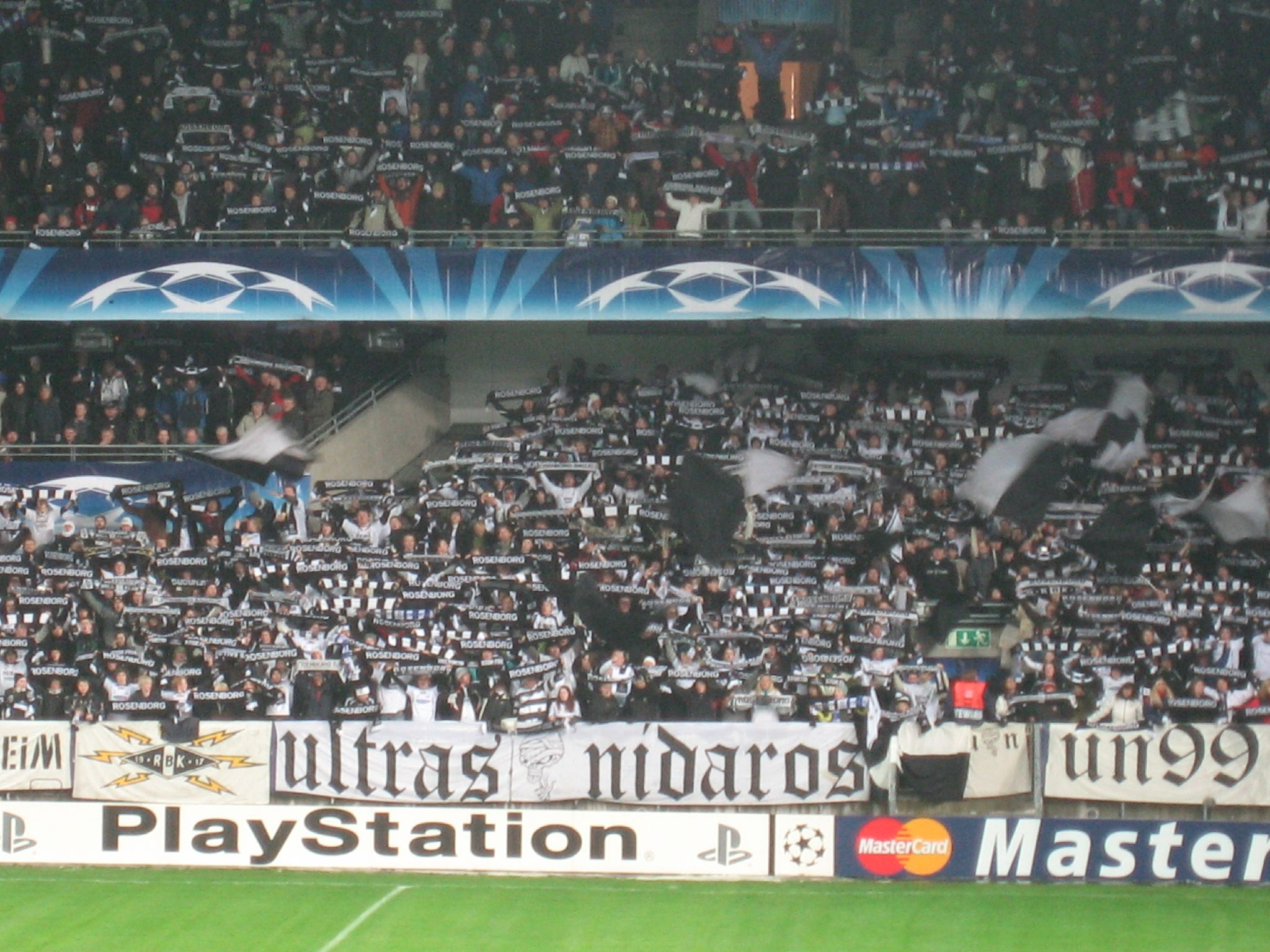
Kjernen

Rosenborg's woes continued in the spring of 2006. Halfway through the season, rival Brann held a commanding 10-point lead. On 27 July, Per-Mathias Høgmo went on sick leave, citing burn-out as the cause. Assistant manager Knut Tørum took up the reins. For the third time in three years, an assistant would take the helm. This time, however, it was a complete success. Rosenborg won eight straight games, eliminating Brann's lead, and finally overtaking them. On 22 October, in what was described as "the biggest clash since the Battle of Stiklestad", Rosenborg defeated Brann away, giving the club a six-point lead with two rounds to go. The following weekend, Rosenborg defeated Viking, securing the club's 20th league title. On 31 October, Per-Mathias Høgmo ended prolonged speculation on whether he would return and in what role, when he held a press conference where he stated that he resigned as manager with immediate effect, and would withdraw from football altogether. Tørum accepted an offer to be the permanent manager. Another resignation came on 11 February 2007, when director Rune Bratseth announced his resignation, citing among other things huge pressure from the media as his reason to resign. He was replaced by Knut Thorbjørn Eggen, son of former manager Nils Arne Eggen, from 1 August.

Despite the good result in 2006, manager Knut Tørum wasn't able to gain the same success in the 2007 season. That, together with his troubles to get along with director Knut Thorbjørn Eggen resulted in his resignation on 25 October 2007. Assistant manager Trond Henriksen took charge of the club for the remainder of the 2007 season. Rosenborg finished the season in 5th place.

After Tørum's resignation, Rosenborg started negotiating with Trond Sollied to fill the head coach vacancy. Sollied, who since his departure in 1998 had become a merited coach in Belgium, had earlier been linked back to Rosenborg at several occasions. After a lengthy process Sollied turned down the job, giving ammunition to those criticizing the way in which Rosenborg has dealt with their recurring head coach issue in the latter years. On 28 December, Rosenborg announced Erik Hamrén as their new coach for the 2008 season. Hamrén started as coach in Rosenborg on 1 June 2008, after he had fulfilled his duties as coach for Aalborg. Days before Hamren's arrival Knut Thorbjørn Eggen announced his immediate resignation. The media speculated Eggen's resignation had been demanded by Hamrén in order to gain total control over the club. At 27 July 2008, Rosenborg became the first Norwegian team ever to win a final match in the UEFA Intertoto Cup, beating Dutch team NAC Breda 2–1 on aggregate. The win put RBK in the 2nd Qualifying Round of the 2008–09 UEFA Cup, where they advanced to the Group Stage. They did not win the Intertoto Cup, however; under rules instituted for the 2006 competition, the trophy is awarded to the Intertoto Cup club that advances farthest in the UEFA Cup. In the group stage Rosenborg failed to impress, finishing last with two points. The club also failed in the League, finishing at a disappointing fifth place, for a consecutive season.

Ahead of the 2009 season, Hamrén brought several new players to Rosenborg, one of them being Rade Prica, who Hamrén knew well from Aalborg. At the end of the season, Rosenborg won the league with 69 points, 13 points ahead of their nearest rival Molde. Rosenborg lost only one league game, a 3–2 loss against Start. Rosenborg had their run to the Double stopped by Molde in the cup's quarter final, losing 5–0. The club got their revenge in late September, when they defeated Molde in the league and by that secured their 21st league title.

On 20 May 2010 it was decided that Nils Arne Eggen would lead Rosenborg for the 2010 season. He took over after Erik Hamrén who went to be the Manager for the national team of Sweden. Erik Hamréns last match was a 2–1 away win against Viking on 24 May.

On 24 October 2010, Rosenborg won the league for the 22nd time after winning 1–0 against Tromsø. On 7 November, Rosenborg played the last league game of the season against Aalesund, ending in a 2–2 draw, which meant that they went unbeaten all season in the league competition.

Jan Jönsson, whose contract with Stabæk ended after the 2010 season, was hired as head coach ahead of the 2011 season and he led the team for two seasons, where Rosenborg finishing third in the league and qualified for the Europe League group stage both years. However, the club was not happy with Jönsson's results as head coach and he was sacked on 7 December 2012.

=== Back to the roots project (2013–2014) ===
In the search for a new head coach, Per Joar Hansen was linked to Rosenborg, but the message was not well received from the supporters. Hansen's previous stay at Lerkendal ended poorly, and therefore many fans were skeptical of him as the replacement for Jan Jönsson. On 14 December 2012, Per Joar Hansen was confirmed as new head coach, with the ambition to take Rosenborg back to the top of the league. Hansen's first major modification was changing from Rosenborg's regular 4–4–2 to the more aggressive 4–3–3 as they played in the 90's, taking the team back to the roots. Hansen's change of formation did not become well received when Rosenborg only scored three goals in their eight pre-season matches. Midway through the season, the team impressed everyone with great progress in the Norwegian Cup, being second in the league, and as expected progressing from the Europa League first qualifying round by beating Northern Irish Crusaders, 2–1 away and ending with 7–2 victory at Lerkendal.

However, the beginning of the second half of the season shocked everyone, when Rosenborg were surprisingly beaten by St Johnstone in the Europa League second qualifying round. Frazer Wright's goal earned the Scottish side a memorable 1–0 victory in Norway, before fighting back from an early goal to draw 1–1 at home. This was enough to secure a 2–1 aggregate victory for St Johnstone. Rosenborg continued to gather points in the league, but were shocked when they lost to relegation threatened Tromsø in the 23rd round. They finished in second place, one point behind Strømsgodset, mainly due to their performance at home.

Rosenborg had managed to enter the Cup Final against arch-rival Molde. This was Rosenborg's first Cup Final since 2003, when they beat Bodø/Glimt 3–1. Unfortunately for Rosenborg, they lost the match 2–4 after leading 2–1.

In June 2014, after a disappointing spring season with elimination from the Cup in the third round against Ranheim, lack of stable performance in the league and an embarrassing defeat against Sligo Rovers in the Europa League, the decision was made to fire head coach Per Joar Hansen and assistant coach Bård Wiggen.

Former Rosenborg player and assistant coach Kåre Ingebrigtsen was presented as temporary coach on 21 July 2014, and sports director Erik Hoftun was presented as assistant coach. Rosenborg played poorly in the first matches with the new coach, losing three of the first four with Kåre Ingebrigsten in charge. But, the team redeemed themselves by winning nine of the last ten games in the season, finishing in second place, eleven points behind Molde. Ingebrigtsen's great performance led to him being appointed as the new permanent coach 20 November 2014.

=== Success (2015–2019) ===
Kåre Ingebrigsten's first major change was the amount of exercise the players should be susceptible to. He had the same vision as former coach Hansen, but the players had to be able to perform better. During the previous two seasons, Rosenborg had a tendency to collective collapse in the last ten minutes of matches due to exhaustion. Ingebrigtsen decided therefore that the training would be increased by 40 percent, so that players would be able to finish matches and not let easy goals get scored against. The provision gave results immediately; Rosenborg scored 23 goals and let only two against in their first five pre-season matches.

The season saw Rosenborg win the title again. They made the play-off in the Europa League, beating Debrecen 3–2 in the first leg away in Hungary. As a result of Rosenborg's crowd pleasing play, the home spectator numbers increased by 31 percent from 13,922 to 18,239 on average.

At the end of the season, Rosenborg won their 23rd title, finishing 12 points clear ahead of the second place Strømsgodset. On 22 November, Rosenborg beat Sarpsborg 08 2–0 in the Cup final to win their 10th national cup and complete their eighth domestic Double.

In 2016, Rosenborg won both the league and the cup and, by doing so, became the first team in Norway to win the double two consecutive seasons. This was Rosenborg's ninth domestic double.

For 2017, the club sparked international attention by signing ex-Arsenal player Nicklas Bendtner. Rosenborg also had a good start in the season, having a 9-match unbeaten streak before losing 2-1 to Tromsø IL. In total, the team lost five matches to defend their Eliteserien title, with Bendtner scoring 19 goals, but lost in the Norwegian Cup to Vålerenga. Doing slightly well in Europe, Rosenborg was eliminated by Celtic in the third qualifying round, but still managed to secure themselves international competition in the form of UEFA Europa League, knocking out the previous finalists Ajax thanks to a late brace by Samuel Adegbenro. Opening the group stage with of 4-0 away thrashing by Real Sociedad, Rosenborg could only secure themselves one win against Macedonian FK Vardar and getting another two draws, resulting in a 3rd place and thus elimination.

For 2018, Rosenborg continued signing mostly Scandinavian players from abroad, but had a bad start to the league, losing to Sarpsborg 08 1-0 on the first matchday. Despite that setback, the club still managed to return to old strength, winning in the Mesterfinalen against Lillestrøm SK and going on a 10-match unbeaten streak in the league. Nevertheless though, after not being able to resort to first place with half the season over, coach Ingebrigtsen got sacked on 19 July 2018 and replaced with interim manager Rini Coolen. Under Coolen, the squad got modernised: After the summer transfer window opened, he broke the Ingebrigtsen's tradition and started signing more international players in the form of Đorđe Denić and Issam Jebali. The team also saw a radical upturn in general. Despite finishing last in the UEFA Europa League, Rosenborg only lost once in the Eliteserien and clinched the title on the 28th matchday, winning against Odds BK. The team also completed its 10th domestic double, defeating Strømsgodset in the Norwegian Cup final on 2 December.

=== Domestic struggles (2019–present) ===
On 3 January 2019, Rosenborg hired Eirik Horneland from FK Haugesund. The club performed well in friendlies, but failed miserably in the Eliteserien that year: Out of eight games, they could only get one win and were 15th in the table, which was their worst placement by that time since 2011. Despite that and a surprise loss to Aalesunds FK in the cup a month later, Horneland kept his job and turned things around, finishing third on the last matchday. He almost even got Rosenborg back in the UEFA Champions League, but a 2-0 loss to Dinamo Zagreb cost him that achievement and again swept the club into the Europa League, finishing last in their group.

Under Horneland, the club also experienced a major transition for following year: With most of the key players gone, the club started investing in free agents from abroad and academy graduates in the summer. But the most notable acquisitions were made in the winter: Dino Islamović, a former Sweden youth international who made a name for himself in the Allsvenskan, and Kristoffer Zachariassen, a fellow Eliteserien player who scored against Rosenborg two years prior. And compared to recent seasons, 2020 was by far the worst: They again started averagely and finished a meagre fourth, what became their first absence from the podium in 12 years. Also with the Norwegian Cup cancelled due to the COVID-19 pandemic, the club lost to PSV in the UEFA Europa League play-offs, missing out on an international group stage for the first time since 2017. The season also resulted in the firing of Horneland, who got replaced by the returning Åge Hareide.

Under Hareide, the club continued to evolve, with five players being released in the winter transfer window alone. Although the performances were more consistent, the club couldn't escape finishing 5th and missing out on international footbal for the first time since 1987. 2021 also marked another trophyless season for the club, losing out to Viking FK in the Norwegian Cup and missing out on the group stage of the newly founded UEFA Conference League, losing yet again in the play-offs, this time to Stade Rennes.

The 2022 season saw chairman Ivar Koteng being replaced by former Norwegian cyclist Cecilie Gotaas Johnsen, and Kjetil Rekdal being appointed new manager. Although the club returned to Europe for the 2023-24 season, the trophy drought continued, with the Norwegian Cup again being lost to Viking. And it didn't get better from there: 2023 saw the club finish a surprising 9th and lose in the cup to third league club IL Stjørdals-Blink and in the following year, depsite a surpising 1-0 win against Manchester United in June 2024, they finished 4th and lost the cup in the third round against eventual cup winners Fredrikstad FK. In 2025, the club performed consistenly well throughout the season, even taking pole in the starting days of the season, but losing valuable points got them a 7th place finish. To make it even more painful, the team got knocked out by Bryne in the revamped Norwegian Cup, now beginning in the summer. The club also continued failing to enter Europe, losing in UEFA Conference League qualifying twice (2023 against Hearts, 2025 against Mainz 05).

== Colours and badge ==
The founding members of Rosenborg bought their first kits in 1918. The shirts were blue with a yellow vertical stripe on the front and the shorts were white. The current white shirts and black shorts, introduced in 1931, were another tribute to the football club Odd. A shirt sponsor was introduced in 1971.

Home kit: White shirt and black shorts.

Away kit: Black shirt and black shorts.

Third kit: Red shirt and red shorts.

== Stadium ==
Rosenborg play their home matches at Lerkendal Stadion, an all-seater stadium located at Lerkendal, 3 kilometers (1.9 mi) south of the city center. It has four three-tier grandstands without corners with a capacity for 21,426 spectators, of which 1,338 are in club seating and luxury boxes on the center tier of all four stands. The stadium is part of Lerkendal idrettspark, which also consists of three training pitches, two full size and one which has artificial turf. The club's offices are located in Brakka, a German-built barracks dating from World War II.

Lerkendal Stadion opened on 10 August 1947 as the main athletics and football venue in Trondheim, owned by the municipality. Rosenborg took Lerkendal into use from the 1957–58 season. The first major rebuilding of the venue took place ahead of the 1962 season, when the wooden stands were torn and replaced with concrete stands on both long sides, and the south stand received a roof. Floodlighting was installed in 1968 to allow UEFA club tournament matches to be held at the venue. The official all-time record at Lerkendal is 28,569 from the 1985 season league match against Lillestrøm. After the 1995 season, the first part of the current stadium was built to allow for modern facilities for UEFA matches. The short sides were finished in 2001, and the final long stand was completed in 2002. The expansion also saw Rosenborg and private investors purchase the stadium.

== Players and staff ==
=== Current squad ===
As of 19 August 2026

Note: Flags indicate national team as defined under FIFA eligibility rules; some limited exceptions apply. Players may hold more than one non-FIFA nationality.

No.	Pos.	Nation	Player
1	GK	SWE	Leopold Wahlstedt
3	DF	NOR	Tobias Dahl
4	DF	NOR	Mikkel Konradsen Ceïde
5	DF	NOR	Håkon Singsdal Volden
6	MF	NOR	Mathias Kjølø
7	MF	NOR	Simen Bolkan Nordli
8	MF	NOR	Iver Fossum
9	FW	MNE	Dino Islamović
10	MF	NOR	Ole Selnæs (vice-captain)
11	FW	DEN	Noah Sahsah
12	GK	NOR	Rasmus Sandberg
14	FW	NOR	Jesper Reitan-Sunde
15	DF	DEN	Jonas Mortensen
16	DF	NOR	Aslak Fonn Witry

No.	Pos.	Nation	Player
17	MF	DEN	Mads Bomholt
18	FW	ALG	Amin Chiakha
19	DF	NOR	Adrian Pereira
20	MF	NOR	Aleksander Borgersen
21	DF	SVK	Tomáš Nemčík
22	DF	NOR	Jonas Svensson (captain)
23	DF	UKR	Mark Mampassi
24	GK	NOR	Haakon Ingdal Sørum
25	MF	NOR	Johan Bakke
27	FW	NOR	Daniel Thorstensen
28	MF	NOR	Elias Slørdal
29	FW	SVK	Dávid Ďuriš
30	FW	POL	Maciej Soboczynski
35	FW	NOR	Emil Konradsen Ceïde

For season transfers, see transfers winter 2025–26 and transfers summer 2026.

=== Out on loan ===
Note: Flags indicate national team as defined under FIFA eligibility rules; some limited exceptions apply. Players may hold more than one non-FIFA nationality.

No.	Pos.	Nation	Player
—	FW	NOR	Magnus Holte (at Levanger until 31 December 2026)
55	MF	NOR	Elias Sandrød (at Stjørdals-Blink until 31 December 2026)
56	MF	NOR	Isak Holmen (at Levanger until 31 December 2026)

=== Rosenborg 2 and U19 squad ===
As of 23 January 2026, according to the official Rosenborg website.

- First team players, Under-17 players and Under-15 players are also eligible for Rosenborg 2 matches.

Note: Flags indicate national team as defined under FIFA eligibility rules; some limited exceptions apply. Players may hold more than one non-FIFA nationality.

No.	Pos.	Nation	Player
13	GK	NOR	David Leander Amdam
37	DF	NOR	Boye Skøre Hedman
N/A	GK	NOR	Sander Stokke
N/A	GK	NOR	Erik Michaelsen Tronesvold
N/A	DF	NOR	Peder William Krage
N/A	DF	NOR	Even Bergh Grimsø
N/A	DF	NOR	Eirik Sandøy Myrvågnes
N/A	DF	NOR	Håkon Grønbech Austad
N/A	DF	NOR	Vemund Thue Gabrielsen
N/A	MF	NOR	Magnus Wik Sylte
N/A	MF	NOR	Thomas Kvendbø Holden

No.	Pos.	Nation	Player
N/A	MF	NOR	Filip Voje Stene
N/A	MF	NOR	Henry Brekk Troset
N/A	MF	NOR	Fredrik Dørrum Berg
N/A	MF	NOR	Iver Solberg Jacobsen
N/A	FW	NOR	Benjamin Hoff Fuglås
N/A	FW	NOR	Ole Christopher Gaddass Sand
N/A	FW	NOR	Fredrik Røsten
N/A	FW	NOR	Eskil Skoglund Hermansen
N/A	FW	NOR	Magnus Qvigstad

=== Under-17 squad ===
As of 23 January 2026, according to the official Rosenborg website.

Note: Flags indicate national team as defined under FIFA eligibility rules; some limited exceptions apply. Players may hold more than one non-FIFA nationality.

No.	Pos.	Nation	Player
N/A	GK	NOR	Marius Østerlie Gladsøy
N/A	GK	NOR	Markus Vigeland Jørgensen
N/A	DF	NOR	Jonas Nordgård Stensaas
N/A	DF	NOR	Aksel Rød
N/A	DF	NOR	Oliver Bjørnstad Fjelldal
N/A	DF	NOR	Håkon Toresen
N/A	DF	NOR	Matheo Kristensen
N/A	DF	NOR	Niklas Børset
N/A	DF	NOR	Isak Rekstad-Johnsen
N/A	DF	NOR	Jacob Steen Erlandsen
N/A	DF	NOR	Håkon Toresen

No.	Pos.	Nation	Player
N/A	MF	NOR	Liam Luu
N/A	MF	NOR	Jaran Leikvam Melum
N/A	MF	NOR	Max Banino-Rokkones
N/A	MF	NOR	Emil Kvithammer Sæther
N/A	MF	NOR	Isak Dahle-Johansen
N/A	MF	NOR	Odin Bach
N/A	FW	IDN	Nicholas Mjøsund
N/A	FW	NOR	Marcus Knutsen
N/A	FW	NOR	Morten Trøen
N/A	FW	NOR	Håkon Mestvedt
N/A	FW	NOR	Kasper Aunan Bardal

=== Under-15 squad ===
As of 23 January 2026, according to the official Rosenborg website.

Note: Flags indicate national team as defined under FIFA eligibility rules; some limited exceptions apply. Players may hold more than one non-FIFA nationality.

No.	Pos.	Nation	Player
N/A	GK	NOR	Sverre Hiller Hoftun
N/A	GK	NOR	Casper Øverås
N/A	DF	NOR	Mohamed Saleban
N/A	DF	NOR	Øyvind Holte
N/A	DF	NOR	Erlend Næss Pedersen
N/A	DF	NOR	Benjamin Juul Engebretsen
N/A	DF	NOR	William Onsøien Eidem
N/A	DF	NOR	Levi Busch Andresen
N/A	MF	NOR	Nikolai Aas
N/A	MF	NOR	Jakob Ulset

No.	Pos.	Nation	Player
N/A	MF	NOR	Marius Ulstad
N/A	MF	NOR	Colin Elias Tidemann
N/A	MF	NOR	Noah Aavik Hellan
N/A	MF	NOR	Oskar Aakre Dromnes
N/A	MF	NOR	Jakob Ulset
N/A	FW	NOR	Theodor Kvernland Aasheim
N/A	FW	NOR	Daniel Aarvaag Monkan
N/A	FW	NOR	Erik Grøtte
N/A	FW	NOR	Elias Michelsen

=== Coaching staff ===
Position	Name
Head coach	(Iceland) Freyr Alexandersson
Assistant coach	(Denmark) Jonathan Hartmann
Assistant coach	(Norway) Alexander Tettey
Sports director	(Iceland) Alfreð Finnbogason
Goalkeeper coach	(Norway) Alexander Lund Hansen
Team leader	(Norway) Jørn Jamtfall
Development leader	(Norway) Tore Grønning
Osteopath	(Norway) Ole Lilleås Næss
Physiotherapist	(Norway) Arve Næss Kjøsnes
Leader of fysmed department	(Norway) Ulrik Wisløff
Physical trainer	(Norway) Vetle Veierød
Scout - Top player developer	(Norway) Trond Henriksen
Material master	(Norway) Alexander Kopperud
Material assistant	(Norway) Per Nygaard
Doctor	(Norway) Julie Nesheim
Mental trainer	(Denmark) Martin Langagergaard
Head of academy	(Norway) Christer Basma
Reserve team head coach	(Norway) Roger Naustan
Under-16 head coach	(Norway) Nils Petter Austad
Under-16 assistant coach	(Norway) Sarmed Saify
Coach developer and responsibility for role training	(Norway) Svein Maalen
Training with responsibility for role training	(Norway) Jonas Lian Hansen
Under-16 goalkeeper coach	(Norway) Andreas Ørsleie
Physical trainer and physiotherapist	(Norway) Peder Lindsetmo
Equipment manager	(Norway) Anders Megård
Goal boy	(Norway) Ole Hammerfjell Sæter

=== Administrative staff ===
Position	Name
Chairman	(Norway) Odd Einar Landsem
Managing director	(Norway) Tore Bjørseth Berdal
Sports director	(Iceland) Alfreð Finnbogason

== Recent seasons ==
Last ten seasons
Season	League											Cup	Other competitions				Top goalscorer		Ref(s)
Season	Division	P	W	D	L	GF	GA	GD	Pts	Pos	Att	Cup	Other	CL	EL	ECL	Name	Goals	Ref(s)
2016	TL	30	21	6	3	65	25	+40	69	1st	17,585	W	—	Q3	PO	—	Christian Gytkjær	19 ♦	
2017	ES	30	18	7	5	57	20	+37	61	1st	17,593	QF	Mesterfinalen – W	Q3	GS	—	Nicklas Bendtner	19 ♦	
2018	ES	30	19	7	4	51	24	+27	64	1st	16,234	W	Mesterfinalen – W	Q2	GS	—	Alexander Søderlund	8	
2019	ES	30	14	10	6	53	41	+12	52	3rd	12,704	R4	Mesterfinalen Cancelled	PO	GS	—	Alexander Søderlund	8	
2020	ES	30	15	7	8	50	35	+15	52	4th	307 (Note: Restrictions due to COVID-19 pandemic)	Cancelled	—	—	PO	—	Kristoffer Zachariassen; Dino Islamović	12	
2021	ES	30	13	9	8	58	42	+16	48	5th	6,577 (Note: Restrictions due to COVID-19 pandemic)	R3	—	—	—	PO	Stefano Vecchia	11	
2022	ES	30	16	8	6	69	44	+25	56	3rd	13,092	R4	—	—	—	—	Casper Tengstedt	15	
2023	ES	30	11	6	13	46	50	-4	39	9th	14,098	R2	—	—	—	Q3	Ole Sæter	8	
2024	ES	30	16	5	9	52	39	+13	53	4th	13,816	R3	—	—	—	—	Ole Sæter	10	
2025	ES	30	11	9	10	45	42	+3	42	7th	14,443	QF	—	—	—	PO	Dino Islamović	14	
2026 (in progress)	ES	27	14	5	8	55	34	+21	47	4th		R4	—	—	—	—	Amin Chiakha	19	

== In European football ==
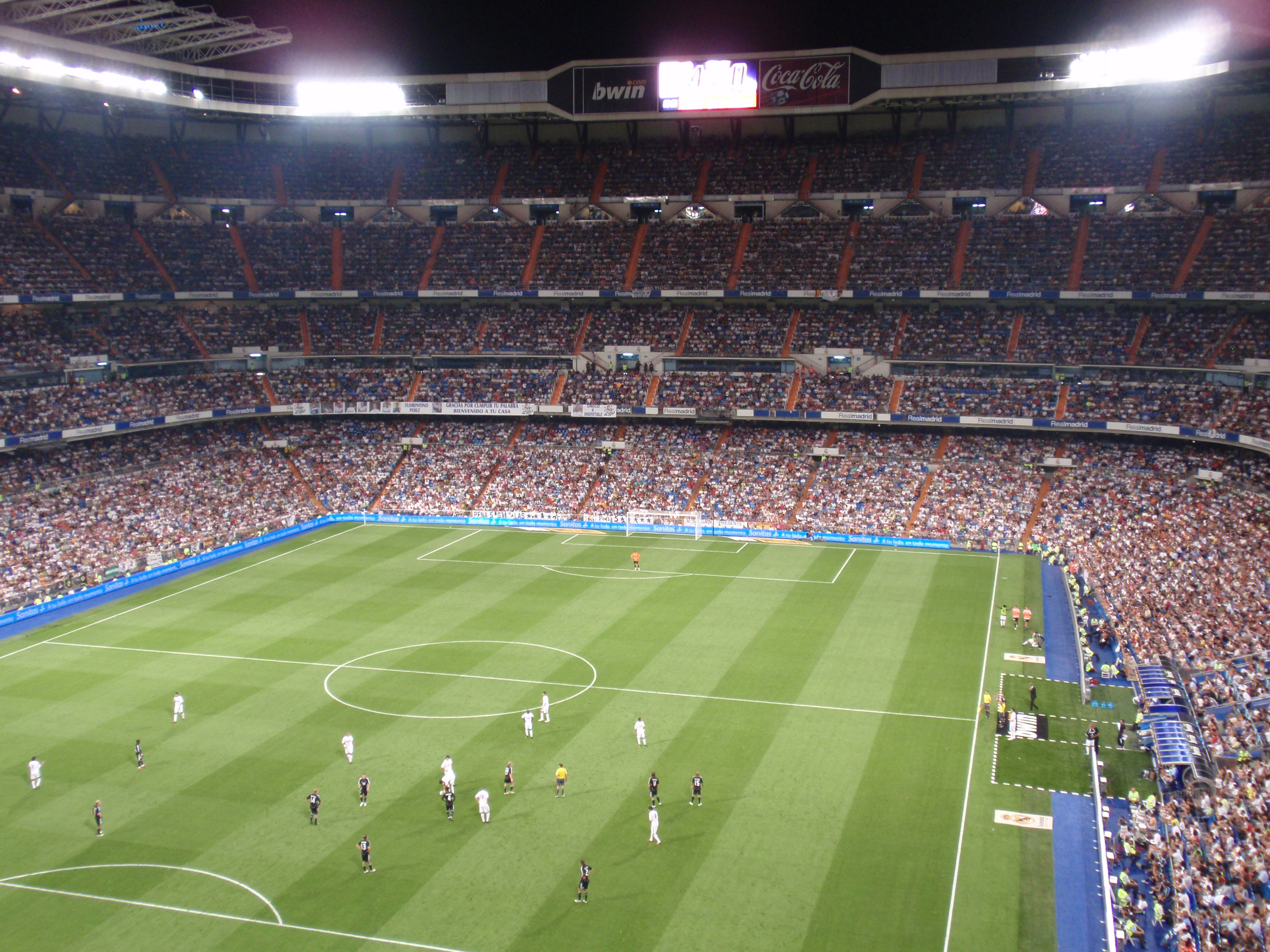
Rosenborg playing Real Madrid in the XXXI Trofeo Santiago Bernabéu at Estadio Santiago Bernabéu in 2009

The following is a list of the all-time statistics from Rosenborg's games in the four UEFA tournaments it has participated in, as well as the overall total. The list contains the tournament, the number of games played (P), won (W), drawn (D) and lost (L). The number of goals scored (GF), goals against (GA), goal difference (GD) and the percentage of matches won (Win%). The statistics include qualification matches and is up to date as of the 2023–24 season. The statistics also include goals scored during extra time where applicable; in these games, the result given is the result at the end of extra time.

Updated 2 March 2026

Tournament	P	W	D	L	GF	GA	GD	Win%
Champions League / European Cup	152	58	31	63	224	232	−8	38.16
Europa League / UEFA Cup	114	45	20	49	164	163	+1	39.47
UEFA Europa Conference League	16	10	2	4	34	21	+13	62.50
Cup Winners' Cup	4	2	0	2	7	8	−1	50.00
UEFA Intertoto Cup	4	3	0	1	9	2	+7	75.00
Total	290	118	53	119	438	426	+12	40.69

== Records ==
The club's record win is 17–0 in a cup match against Buvik in 2003; the league record is 10–0 against Brann in 1996 and the Champions League record is 6–0 against Helsingborg in 2000. In the league, the team had a record 87–20 goal difference in 1997, claimed a record 69 points in 2009 and went undefeated in 2010. Rosenborg was relegated after the 1977 season having won just a single match. The record home attendance is 28,569 spectators at the Lerkendal Stadion against Lillestrøm in 1985.

Roar Strand, who played 21 seasons between 1989 and 2010, has played 644 matches, more than any other Rosenborg player. He has also won the most titles with the club, having won the league 16 times and the cup five times. With 256 goals, Harald Martin Brattbakk is the club's all-time top scorer and was the league's top scorer during six seasons. Sigurd Rushfeldt is the league's all-time top scorer, although he scored a majority of these for Tromsø. Odd Iversen holds the record for most goals in a single match and season, with six and 30 respectively. The club received its highest transfer fee for John Carew; they received 75 million Norwegian krone when he was sold to Valencia in 2000.

== Honours ==
- 1. divisjon / Eliteserien:
  - Winners (26) (Record): 1967, 1969, 1971, 1985, 1988, 1990, 1992, 1993, 1994, 1995, 1996, 1997, 1998, 1999, 2000, 2001, 2002, 2003, 2004, 2006, 2009, 2010, 2015, 2016, 2017, 2018
  - Runners-up (7): 1968, 1970, 1973, 1989, 1991, 2013, 2014
  - Third place (5): 1981, 2011, 2012, 2019, 2022
- Norwegian Football Cup:
  - Winners (12) (Joint-Record): 1960, 1964, 1971, 1988, 1990, 1992, 1995, 1999, 2003, 2015, 2016, 2018
  - Runners-up (6): 1967, 1972, 1973, 1991, 1998, 2013
- Superfinalen / Mesterfinalen:
  - Winners (3) (Record): 2010, 2017, 2018

=== European ===
- UEFA Intertoto Cup:
  - Winners (1): 2008 (joint winner)

== Coaches ==
- (Norway) Knut Næss (1965–68)
- (England) George Curtis (1968 – 31 Dec 1970)
- (Norway) Nils Arne Eggen (1 Jan 1971 – 31 Dec 1972)
- (Norway) Tor Røste Fossen (1973 – 31 Dec 1974)
- (Norway) Jan Christiansen (1975)
- (England) George Curtis (1 Jan 1976 – 27 Aug 1976)
- (Norway) Nils Arne Eggen (27 Aug 1976 – 31 Dec 1976)
- (Norway) Bjørn Rime (1977)
- (Norway) Nils Arne Eggen (1 Jan 1978 – 31 Dec 1982)
- (England) Tommy Cavanagh (1983 – Sept 83)
- (Norway) Harald Sunde (Sept 1983–83)
- (Norway) Bjørn Hansen (1984–85)
- (Norway) Arne Dokken (22 Aug 1985 – 31 Dec 1985)
- (Norway) Torkild Brakstad (1 Jan 1986 – 30 June 1986)
- (Norway) Arne Dokken (1 July 1986 – 31 Dec 1987)
- (Norway) Nils Arne Eggen (1 Jan 1988 – 31 Dec 1997)
- (Norway) Trond Sollied (1 Jan 1998 – 31 Dec 1998)
- (Norway) Nils Arne Eggen (1 Jan 1999 – 31 Dec 2002)
- (Norway) Åge Hareide (1 Jan 2003 – 27 Nov 2003)
- (Norway) Ola By Rise (28 Nov 2003 – 31 Dec 2004)
- (Norway) Per Joar Hansen (1 Jan 2005 – 7 Aug 2005)
- (Norway) Per-Mathias Høgmo (8 Aug 2005 – 6 June 2006)
- (Norway) Knut Tørum (7 June 2006 – 25 Oct 2007)
- (Norway) Trond Henriksen (interim) (25 Oct 2007 – 31 May 2008)
- (Sweden) Erik Hamrén (1 June 2008 – 24 May 2010)
- (Norway) Nils Arne Eggen (25 May 2010 – 31 Dec 2010)
- (Sweden) Jan Jönsson (1 Jan 2011 – 7 Dec 2012)
- (Norway) Per Joar Hansen (14 Dec 2012 – 21 July 2014)
- (Norway) Kåre Ingebrigtsen (21 July 2014 – 19 July 2018)
- (Netherlands) Rini Coolen (interim) (19 July 2018 – 31 December 2018)
- (Norway) Eirik Horneland (3 January 2019 – 26 June 2020)
- (Norway) Trond Henriksen (interim) (27 June 2020 – 31 August 2020)
- (Norway) Åge Hareide (1 September 2020 – 31 December 2021)
- (Norway) Kjetil Rekdal (1 January 2022 – 16 June 2023)
- (Norway) Svein Maalen (interim) (16 June 2023 – 14 December 2023)
- (Sweden) Alfred Johansson (14 December 2023 – 5 May 2026)
- (Norway) Alexander Tettey (interim) (5 May 2026 – 17 June 2026)
- (Iceland) Freyr Alexandersson (17 June 2026 –)

== References and notes ==
Notes

Bibliography

- Svardal, Geir (2007). Historien om Rosenborg Ballklub 1917–2007 (in Norwegian). Trondheim: Tapir Akademosk Forlag. ISBN 978-82-519-2188-6.
