= 1989 Norwegian First Division =

45th season of top-tier football league in Norway

1. divisjon
- Season: 1989
- Dates: 30 April – 8 October
- Champions: Lillestrøm; 5th title
- Relegated: Sogndal; Mjølner
- European Cup: Lillestrøm
- Cup Winners' Cup: Viking
- UEFA Cup: Rosenborg
- Matches played: 132
- Goals scored: 405 (3.07 per match)
- Top goalscorer: Jahn Ivar "Mini" Jakobsen (18 goals)
- Biggest home win: Molde 7–0 Mjølner (1 October 1989)
- Biggest away win: Vålerengen 2–8 Rosenborg (1 October 1989)
- Highest scoring: Vålerengen 2–8 Rosenborg (1 October 1989)
- Highest attendance: 16,753; Rosenborg 6–2 Mjølner (16 May 1989)
- Lowest attendance: 554; Mjølner 3–3 Sogndal (8 October 1989)
- Average attendance: 4,729 ▲6.9%

The 1989 1. divisjon was the 45th completed season of top division football in Norway. The season began on 30 April 1989, and ended on 8 October 1989.

22 games were played with 3 points given for wins and 1 for draws. Number eleven and twelve were relegated. The winners of the two groups of the 2. divisjon were promoted, as well as the winner of a series of play-off matches between the two second placed teams in the two groups of the 2. divisjon and number ten in the 1. divisjon.

This was the last season the top flight of Norwegian football would be called the 1. divisjon. The following year, the league changed its name to Tippeligaen, from its sponsor, Norsk Tipping.

== Teams and locations ==
Note: Table lists in alphabetical order.

Team	Ap.	Location	Stadium
Brann	33	Bergen	Brann Stadion
Kongsvinger	7	Kongsvinger	Gjemselund Stadion
Lillestrøm	26	Lillestrøm	Åråsen Stadion
Mjølner	2	Narvik	Narvik Stadion
Molde	15	Molde	Molde Stadion
Moss	15	Moss	Melløs Stadion
Rosenborg	26	Trondheim	Lerkendal Stadion
Sogndal	3	Sogndalsfjøra	Fosshaugane
Start	21	Kristiansand	Kristiansand Stadion
Tromsø	4	Tromsø	Alfheim Stadion
Vålerengen	34	Oslo	Bislett Stadion
Viking	40	Stavanger	Stavanger Stadion

== League table ==
Pos	Team	Pld	W	D	L	GF	GA	GD	Pts	Qualification or relegation
1	Lillestrøm (C)	22	16	4	2	31	13	+18	52	Qualification for the European Cup first round
2	Rosenborg	22	13	5	4	56	29	+27	44	Qualification for the UEFA Cup first round
3	Tromsø	22	11	4	7	36	25	+11	37	
4	Molde	22	11	4	7	40	32	+8	37	
5	Kongsvinger	22	10	4	8	34	25	+9	34	
6	Viking	22	9	4	9	36	33	+3	31	Qualification for the Cup Winners' Cup first round
7	Brann	22	9	3	10	28	31	−3	30	
8	Moss	22	7	5	10	35	36	−1	26	
9	Start	22	5	8	9	26	34	−8	23	
10	Vålerengen (O)	22	7	2	13	29	52	−23	23	Qualification for the relegation play-offs
11	Sogndal (R)	22	4	6	12	31	45	−14	18	Relegation to Second Division
12	Mjølner (R)	22	4	3	15	23	50	−27	15	Relegation to Second Division

Source: nifs.no
Rules for classification: 1) points; 2) goal difference; 3) number of goals scored.
(C) Champions; (O) Play-off winners; (R) Relegated

== Results ==
Home \ Away	BRA	KON	LIL	FKM	MOL	MOS	ROS	SOG	IKS	TRO	VIK	VÅL
Brann	—	0–1	2–0	4–2	4–1	2–0	0–0	1–0	0–1	0–3	1–0	2–0
Kongsvinger	0–1	—	0–1	1–3	1–0	4–1	2–2	3–1	0–0	3–0	3–0	5–0
Lillestrøm	1–0	0–0	—	1–0	3–1	1–0	0–0	2–1	3–0	1–0	2–1	1–0
Mjølner	1–4	1–1	0–2	—	0–1	3–1	0–2	3–3	1–2	0–3	1–1	2–0
Molde	2–1	1–4	0–3	7–0	—	0–3	3–1	4–2	2–1	3–1	2–0	5–0
Moss	4–2	0–2	2–3	2–0	1–1	—	2–4	2–3	1–1	2–0	2–0	2–2
Rosenborg	4–0	4–1	3–1	6–2	1–1	2–0	—	3–2	2–2	2–1	1–0	2–3
Sogndal	2–2	2–1	0–1	2–1	1–2	0–0	1–4	—	3–3	1–1	2–2	3–1
Start	3–0	0–1	1–1	1–2	2–2	0–1	0–2	1–0	—	1–3	1–1	2–2
Tromsø	0–0	1–0	1–1	2–0	0–0	3–2	2–0	3–0	4–1	—	1–0	4–1
Viking	4–2	6–1	0–1	2–1	2–0	2–2	4–3	2–0	1–3	4–2	—	1–0
Vålerengen	2–0	1–0	1–2	2–0	1–2	1–5	2–8	3–2	2–0	3–1	2–3	—

Source: nifs.no (in Norwegian)
Legend: Blue = home team win; Yellow = draw; Red = away team win.

== Relegation play-offs ==
Vålerengen, Djerv 1919, and HamKam competed in the play-offs, Vålerengen won and remained in the top division.

Results

- Match 1: HamKam 2–2 Vålerengen
- Match 2: Djerv 1919 2–0 HamKam
- Match 3: Vålerengen 1–0 Djerv 1919

Table

Pos	Team	Pld	W	D	L	GF	GA	GD	Pts	Qualification or relegation
1	Vålerengen (O)	2	1	1	0	3	2	+1	4	Remained in the Tippeligaen
2	Djerv 1919	2	1	0	1	2	1	+1	3	Remained in the Second Division
3	Ham-Kam	2	0	1	1	2	4	−2	1	Remained in the Second Division

Source: rsssf.no
(O) Play-off winners

== Season statistics ==
=== Top scorers ===
Rank	Player	Club	Goals
1	(Norway) Jahn Ivar "Mini" Jakobsen	Rosenborg	18
2	(Norway) Karl Petter Løken	Rosenborg	13
3	(Norway) Jostein Flo	Molde	12
4	(Norway) Stein Berg Johansen	Mjølner	11
5	(Sweden) Kjell Jonevret	Viking	10
5	(Republic of Ireland) Mike McCabe	Tromsø	10
7	(Norway) Dag Riisnæs	Kongsvinger	9
7	(Norway) Frank Strandli	Start	9
9	(Norway) Petter Belsvik	Molde	8
9	(Norway) Gøran Sørloth	Rosenborg	8
9	(Norway) Atle Torvanger	Brann	8

=== Attendances ===
Pos	Team	Total	High	Low	Average	Change
1	Rosenborg	132,713	16,753	5,378	12,065	0.0%
2	Brann	86,406	12,134	5,274	7,855	−16.9%
3	Viking	68,134	9,152	3,456	6,194	n/a^{2}
4	Lillestrøm	55,619	12,102	2,170	5,056	+6.5%
5	Tromsø	54,422	7,355	3,398	4,947	+10.5%
6	Start	42,639	6,459	1,696	3,876	n/a^{2}
7	Vålerengen	41,340	8,939	2,108	3,758	+2.2%
8	Molde	38,027	5,380	1,455	3,457	−0.5%
9	Moss	29,147	4,083	1,928	2,650	−20.7%
10	Mjønlner	28,856	5,028	554	2,623	n/a^{2}
11	Kongsvinger	27,573	4,057	1,578	2,507	+18.7%
12	Sogndal	19,404	2,918	1,071	1,764	−29.0%
	League total	624,280	16,753	554	4,729	+6.9%

Source: nifs.no
Notes:
2: Team played last season in 2. divisjon.
