= 1988 Norwegian First Division =

44th season of top-tier football league in Norway

1. divisjon
- Season: 1988
- Dates: 1 May – 9 October
- Champions: Rosenborg; 6th title
- Relegated: Bryne; Strømmen; Djerv 1919
- European Cup: Rosenborg
- Cup Winners’ Cup: Brann
- UEFA Cup: Lillestrøm
- Matches played: 132
- Goals scored: 338 (2.56 per match)
- Top goalscorer: Jan Åge Fjørtoft (14 goals)
- Biggest home win: Rosenborg 8–0 Djerv 1919 (3 July 1988)
- Biggest away win: Djerv 1919 1–6 Rosenborg (2 October 1988)
- Highest scoring: Lillestrøm 8–1 Djerv 1919 (24 September 1988)
- Highest attendance: 22,411; Rosenborg 3–0 Vålerengen (16 May 1988)
- Lowest attendance: 431; Strømmen 2–1 Sogndal (2 October 1988)
- Average attendance: 4,422 ▲25.0%

The 1988 1. divisjon was the 44th completed season of top division football in Norway. The season began on 1 May 1988 and ended on 9 October 1988.

22 games were played with 3 points given for wins and 1 for draws. Number eleven and twelve were relegated. The winners of the two groups of the 2. divisjon were promoted, as well as the winner of a series of play-off matches between the two second placed teams in the two groups of the 2. divisjon and number ten in the 1. divisjon.

Rosenborg won their 6th title.

== Teams and locations ==
Note: Table lists in alphabetical order.

Team	Ap.	Location	Stadium
Brann	32	Bergen	Brann Stadion
Bryne	13	Bryne	Bryne Stadion
Djerv 1919	3	Haugesund	Haugesund Stadion
Kongsvinger	6	Kongsvinger	Gjemselund Stadion
Lillestrøm	25	Lillestrøm	Åråsen Stadion
Molde	14	Molde	Molde Stadion
Moss	14	Moss	Melløs Stadion
Rosenborg	25	Trondheim	Lerkendal Stadion
Sogndal	2	Sogndalsfjøra	Fosshaugane
Strømmen	13	Strømmen	Strømmen Stadion
Tromsø	3	Tromsø	Alfheim Stadion
Vålerengen	33	Oslo	Bislett Stadion

== League table ==
Pos	Team	Pld	W	D	L	GF	GA	GD	Pts	Qualification or relegation
1	Rosenborg (C)	22	14	5	3	54	23	+31	47	Qualification for the European Cup first round
2	Lillestrøm	22	11	7	4	38	18	+20	40	Qualification for the UEFA Cup first round
3	Molde	22	10	9	3	35	18	+17	39	
4	Moss	22	11	4	7	30	19	+11	37	
5	Tromsø	22	9	6	7	27	22	+5	33	
6	Sogndal	22	8	7	7	27	27	0	31	
7	Vålerengen	22	8	6	8	26	32	−6	30	
8	Kongsvinger	22	7	7	8	23	23	0	28	
9	Brann	22	7	4	11	16	30	−14	25	Qualification for the Cup Winners' Cup first round
10	Bryne (R)	22	5	6	11	29	33	−4	21	Qualification for the relegation play-offs
11	Strømmen (R)	22	4	5	13	16	34	−18	17	Relegation to Second Division
12	Djerv 1919 (R)	22	3	4	15	17	59	−42	13	Relegation to Second Division

Source: nifs.no
Rules for classification: 1) points; 2) goal difference; 3) number of goals scored.
(C) Champions; (R) Relegated

== Results ==
Home \ Away	BRA	BRY	DJE	KON	LIL	MOL	MOS	ROS	SOG	SØM	TRO	VÅL
Brann	—	1–0	1–1	1–2	1–0	1–4	0–0	0–4	1–0	1–0	1–0	1–2
Bryne	0–2	—	5–2	0–0	2–3	0–0	0–1	1–3	1–1	1–0	2–0	6–1
Djerv 1919	0–1	1–1	—	0–2	1–2	0–1	1–0	1–6	1–2	1–1	1–1	2–0
Kongsvinger	1–0	1–0	6–0	—	0–0	0–0	3–0	1–1	0–0	1–1	1–2	2–0
Lillestrøm	4–1	1–1	8–1	2–1	—	0–1	3–1	4–1	4–1	1–0	2–0	0–1
Molde	2–0	6–2	1–0	4–1	0–0	—	1–1	2–4	1–1	3–0	0–0	2–2
Moss	2–1	1–1	0–1	6–0	1–1	0–2	—	2–1	1–0	2–0	1–2	2–0
Rosenborg	1–1	2–1	8–0	1–0	1–1	4–2	2–1	—	3–2	3–1	1–2	3–0
Sogndal	2–0	3–2	4–1	1–0	3–1	1–1	0–4	0–0	—	1–0	2–1	0–1
Strømmen	2–0	0–3	5–0	1–0	0–0	0–0	0–1	0–3	2–1	—	1–1	2–5
Tromsø	2–0	3–0	2–1	1–1	0–1	1–0	0–1	1–2	1–1	2–0	—	2–2
Vålerengen	1–1	1–0	2–1	2–0	0–0	0–2	0–2	0–0	1–1	4–0	1–3	—

Source: nifs.no (in Norwegian)
Legend: Blue = home team win; Yellow = draw; Red = away team win.

== Relegation play-offs ==
Bryne, Start, and Ham-Kam competed in the play-offs. Start won and Bryne were relegated to 2. divisjon.

Results

- Match 1: Bryne 1–3 Start
- Match 2: HamKam 2–1 Bryne
- Match 3: Start 2–1 HamKam

Pos	Team	Pld	W	D	L	GF	GA	GD	Pts	Qualification or relegation
1	Start (O, P)	2	2	0	0	5	2	+3	6	Promotion to First Division
2	HamKam	2	1	0	1	3	3	0	3	
3	Bryne (R)	2	0	0	2	2	5	−3	0	Relegation to Second Division

Source: rsssf.no
(O) Play-off winners; (P) Promoted; (R) Relegated

== Season statistics ==
=== Top scorers ===
Rank	Player	Club	Goals
1	(Norway) Jan Åge Fjørtoft	Lillestrøm	14
2	(Norway) Sverre Brandhaug	Rosenborg	10
2	(Norway) Jan Kristian Fjærestad	Moss	10
2	(Norway) Jostein Flo	Molde	10
2	(Norway) Stig Norheim	Bryne	10
2	(Norway) Lasse Opseth	Sogndal	10
2	(Norway) Kjetil Rekdal	Molde	10
2	(Norway) Gøran Sørloth	Rosenborg	10
9	(Norway) Eivind Arnevåg	Vålerengen	9
10	(Norway) Dag Arnesen	Kongsvinger	8
10	(Norway) Jahn Ivar "Mini" Jakobsen	Rosenborg	8

=== Attendances ===
Pos	Team	Total	High	Low	Average	Change
1	Rosenborg	132,769	22,411	5,770	12,070	+131.5%
2	Brann	103,963	13,567	6,438	9,451	+14.4%
3	Lillestrøm	52,225	8,128	1,272	4,748	+46.3%
4	Tromsø	49,235	6,048	1,617	4,476	+32.0%
5	Vålerengen	40,446	9,898	1,001	3,677	+44.4%
6	Molde	38,202	6,520	1,422	3,473	−21.6%
7	Moss	36,753	4,901	1,749	3,341	+15.6%
8	Djerv 1919	31,844	4,826	940	2,895	n/a^{2}
9	Bryne	28,755	4,420	1,388	2,614	−10.6%
10	Sogndal	27,337	6,289	584	2,485	n/a^{2}
11	Kongsvinger	23,232	4,309	881	2,112	−9.6%
12	Strømmen	18,951	5,034	431	1,723	n/a^{2}
	League total	583,712	22,411	431	4,422	+25.0%

Source: nifs.no
Notes:
2: Team played last season in 2. divisjon.
