= 1993 Tippeligaen =

49th season of top-tier football league in Norway

Tippeligaen
- Season: 1993
- Dates: 1 May – 17 October
- Champions: Rosenborg; 8th title
- Relegated: Molde; Fyllingen; Lyn
- Cup Winners' Cup: Bodø/Glimt
- UEFA Cup: Rosenborg; Lillestrøm
- Matches played: 132
- Goals scored: 423 (3.2 per match)
- Top goalscorer: Mons Ivar Mjelde (19 goals)
- Biggest home win: Bodø/Glimt 8–0 Lyn (20 June 1993)
- Biggest away win: Lyn 0–6 HamKam (29 August 1993)
- Highest scoring: Brann 3–7 Lyn (17 October 1993)
- Highest attendance: 24,844; Rosenborg 2–2 Bodø/Glimt (27 June 1993)
- Lowest attendance: 849; HamKam 6–0 Fyllingen (17 October 1993)
- Average attendance: 5,972 ▲10.3%

The 1993 Tippeligaen was the 49th completed season of top division football in Norway. Each team played 22 games, with 3 points given for wins and 1 for draws. Number eleven and twelve are relegated. The winners of the two groups of the first division were promoted, as well as the winner of a series of play-off matches between the two second placed teams in the two groups of the first division and number ten in the Tippeligaen.

== Teams and locations ==
Note: Table lists in alphabetical order.

Team	Ap.	Location	Stadium
Bodø/Glimt	5	Bodø	Aspmyra Stadion
Brann	37	Bergen	Brann Stadion
Fyllingen	3	Bergen	Varden Amfi
HamKam	16	Hamar	Briskeby
Kongsvinger	11	Kongsvinger	Gjemselund Stadion
Lillestrøm	30	Lillestrøm	Åråsen Stadion
Lyn	26	Oslo	Ullevaal Stadion
Molde	19	Molde	Molde Stadion
Rosenborg	30	Trondheim	Lerkendal Stadion
Start	25	Kristiansand	Kristiansand Stadion
Tromsø	8	Tromsø	Alfheim Stadion
Viking	44	Stavanger	Stavanger Stadion

== League table ==
Pos	Team	Pld	W	D	L	GF	GA	GD	Pts	Qualification or relegation
1	Rosenborg (C)	22	14	5	3	47	30	+17	47	Qualification for the UEFA Cup preliminary round
2	Bodø/Glimt	22	14	3	5	51	24	+27	45	Qualification for the Cup Winners' Cup qualifying round
3	Lillestrøm	22	13	3	6	47	26	+21	42	Qualification for the UEFA Cup preliminary round
4	Viking	22	13	2	7	38	27	+11	41	
5	Ham-Kam	22	10	3	9	42	39	+3	33	
6	Tromsø	22	6	8	8	25	25	0	26	
7	Brann	22	7	5	10	31	38	−7	26	
8	Kongsvinger	22	7	4	11	33	41	−8	25	
9	Start	22	6	5	11	26	29	−3	23	
10	Molde (R)	22	5	7	10	23	36	−13	22	Qualification for the relegation play-offs
11	Lyn (R)	22	6	4	12	39	53	−14	22	Relegation to First Division
12	Fyllingen (R)	22	4	5	13	21	55	−34	17	Relegation to First Division

Source: fotball.no
Rules for classification: 1) points; 2) goal difference; 3) number of goals scored.
(C) Champions; (R) Relegated

== Relegation play-offs ==
The qualification play-off matches were contested between Molde (10th in Tippeligaen), Strømsgodset (2nd in the First Division - Group A), and Bryne (2nd in the First Division - Group B). Strømsgodset won both their games and were promoted to Tippeligaen.

Results

- Match 1: Molde 0–2 Strømsgodset
- Match 2: Bryne 2–2 Molde
- Match 3: Strømsgodset 2–0 Bryne

Pos	Team	Pld	W	D	L	GF	GA	GD	Pts	Qualification or relegation
1	Strømsgodset (O, P)	2	2	0	0	4	0	+4	6	Promotion to Tippeligaen
2	Molde (R)	2	0	1	1	2	4	−2	1	Relegation to First Division
3	Bryne	2	0	1	1	2	4	−2	1	Remained in First Division

Source: rsssf.no
(O) Play-off winners; (P) Promoted; (R) Relegated

== Results ==
Home \ Away	BOD	BRA	FYL	HAM	KON	LIL	LYN	MOL	ROS	IKS	TRO	VIK
Bodø/Glimt	—	2–1	5–1	3–0	4–1	1–2	8–0	3–0	1–2	2–1	1–0	4–1
Brann	1–3	—	3–2	2–1	0–0	2–1	3–7	1–1	0–2	2–1	1–1	0–2
Fyllingen	0–0	1–6	—	0–1	5–3	1–2	0–0	2–1	0–4	3–0	0–0	2–1
HamKam	2–1	3–0	6–0	—	1–2	4–3	3–1	1–1	2–4	1–0	2–0	3–3
Kongsvinger	0–1	0–2	6–0	1–2	—	0–2	2–1	2–2	3–0	3–0	2–4	1–0
Lillestrøm	5–3	2–1	3–1	2–0	3–0	—	2–0	3–0	2–3	1–2	3–2	3–0
Lyn	1–2	5–1	3–0	0–6	1–1	1–1	—	5–3	0–1	1–3	2–0	2–3
Molde	0–2	2–0	1–1	0–0	1–1	0–0	6–3	—	0–2	1–0	0–1	3–2
Rosenborg	2–2	0–4	5–1	3–2	3–2	1–1	4–2	2–0	—	2–1	4–2	1–1
Start	0–1	0–0	4–1	2–0	3–0	1–5	2–2	4–0	2–2	—	0–0	0–1
Tromsø	1–1	1–1	0–0	4–1	4–0	2–1	0–2	0–1	0–0	0–0	—	2–1
Viking	3–1	1–0	1–0	7–1	2–3	1–0	2–0	1–0	2–0	1–0	2–1	—

Source: NIFS (in Norwegian)
Legend: Blue = home team win; Yellow = draw; Red = away team win.

== Season statistics ==
=== Top scorers ===
Rank	Player	Club	Goals
1	(Norway) Mons Ivar Mjelde	Lillestrøm	19
2	(Norway) Petter Belsvik	HamKam	16
2	(Norway) Trond Egil Soltvedt	Brann	16
4	(Norway) Kjell Roar Kaasa	Lyn	13
5	(Norway) Geir Frigård	Kongsvinger	12
6	(Norway) Runar Berg	Bodø/Glimt	11
7	(Norway) Egil Østenstad	Viking	10
7	(Norway) Harald Martin Brattbakk	Bodø/Glimt	10
9	(Sweden) Patric Karlsson	Lillestrøm	9
9	(Norway) Roar Strand	Molde	9
9	(Norway) Sigurd Rushfeldt	Tromsø	9

=== Attendances ===
Pos	Team	Total	High	Low	Average	Change
1	Rosenborg	129,250	24,844	6,839	11,750	−13.4%
2	Brann	115,210	23,163	6,656	10,474	+7.3%
3	Viking	95,463	13,875	6,801	8,678	+11.3%
4	Bodø/Glimt	70,468	11,069	3,267	6,406	n/a^{1}
5	Lillestrøm	67,264	9,473	2,400	6,115	+20.6%
6	Start	66,846	10,624	2,481	6,077	+1.4%
7	Lyn	51,180	8,842	2,558	4,653	+18.9%
8	Tromsø	51,067	7,116	3,178	4,642	+20.4%
9	HamKam	38,910	7,612	849	3,537	+6.5%
10	Molde	38,724	7,029	2,005	3,520	−14.8%
11	Kongsvinger	37,248	5,880	2,290	3,386	+7.2%
12	Fyllingen	26,633	7,085	1,108	2,421	n/a^{1}
	League total	788,263	24,844	849	5,972	+10.3%

Source: nifs.no
Notes:
1: Team played last season in 1. divisjon.
