= 1994 Tippeligaen =

50th season of top-tier football league in Norway

Tippeligaen
- Season: 1994
- Dates: 16 April – 16 October
- Champions: Rosenborg; 9th title
- Relegated: Sogndal; Strømsgodset
- Champions League: Rosenborg
- UEFA Cup: Lillestrøm; Viking
- Intertoto Cup: Tromsø
- Matches played: 132
- Goals scored: 430 (3.26 per match)
- Top goalscorer: Harald Martin Brattbakk (17 goals)
- Biggest home win: Rosenborg 9–0 Brann (21 September 1994)
- Biggest away win: Strømsgodset 0–7 Rosenborg (24 July 1994)
- Highest scoring: Rosenborg 9–0 Brann (21 September 1994)
- Highest attendance: 27,661; Rosenborg 5–0 Tromsø (16 May 1994)
- Lowest attendance: 1,005; Sogndal 2–1 HamKam (2 October 1994)
- Average attendance: 5,633 ▼5.7%

The 1994 Tippeligaen was the 50th completed season of top division football in Norway. Each team played 22 games with 3 points given for wins and 1 for draws. This year was the last consisting of 12 teams. The format was expanded to 14 teams the following year. Because of this, number eleven and twelve were relegated, while the winners and runners-up of the two groups of the first division were promoted.

== Teams and locations ==
Note: Table lists in alphabetical order.

Team	Ap.	Location	Stadium
Bodø/Glimt	6	Bodø	Aspmyra Stadion
Brann	38	Bergen	Brann Stadion
HamKam	17	Hamar	Briskeby
Kongsvinger	12	Kongsvinger	Gjemselund Stadion
Lillestrøm	31	Lillestrøm	Åråsen Stadion
Rosenborg	31	Trondheim	Lerkendal Stadion
Sogndal	6	Sogndalsfjøra	Fosshaugane
Start	26	Kristiansand	Kristiansand Stadion
Strømsgodset	14	Drammen	Marienlyst Stadion
Tromsø	9	Tromsø	Alfheim Stadion
VIF Fotball	36	Oslo	Ullevaal Stadion
Viking	45	Stavanger	Stavanger Stadion

== League table ==
Pos	Team	Pld	W	D	L	GF	GA	GD	Pts	Qualification or relegation
1	Rosenborg (C)	22	15	4	3	70	23	+47	49	Qualification for the Champions League qualifying round
2	Lillestrøm	22	12	5	5	42	23	+19	41	Qualification for the UEFA Cup preliminary round
3	Viking	22	11	6	5	41	26	+15	39	Qualification for the UEFA Cup preliminary round
4	Start	22	9	8	5	42	22	+20	35	
5	Kongsvinger	22	11	2	9	38	35	+3	35	
6	Brann	22	9	4	9	38	46	−8	31	
7	Tromsø	22	7	7	8	22	28	−6	28	Qualification for the Intertoto Cup group stage
8	Ham-Kam	22	7	5	10	34	46	−12	26	
9	VIF Fotball	22	5	7	10	32	40	−8	22	
10	Bodø/Glimt	22	5	7	10	30	46	−16	22	
11	Sogndal (R)	22	6	4	12	19	40	−21	22	Relegation to First Division
12	Strømsgodset (R)	22	4	3	15	22	55	−33	15	Relegation to First Division

Source: fotball.no
Rules for classification: 1) points; 2) goal difference; 3) number of goals scored.
(C) Champions; (R) Relegated

Molde FK qualified for the UEFA Cup Winners' Cup as a team from lower division.

== Promotion and relegation ==
- Strindheim, Hødd, Molde and Stabæk were promoted.
- Sogndal and Strømsgodset were relegated.
- Because of the format-expansion, no play-offs were played this year.

== Results ==
Home \ Away	BOD	BRA	HK	KON	LIL	ROS	SOG	IKS	STM	TRO	VIF	VIK
Bodø/Glimt	—	3–0	3–4	1–1	2–3	1–2	1–1	0–6	3–1	0–3	3–2	0–0
Brann	4–0	—	2–2	0–4	3–0	3–2	4–0	1–0	5–1	1–1	1–1	0–3
HamKam	1–3	4–1	—	4–0	0–3	3–2	3–2	1–1	2–0	1–1	0–0	2–2
Kongsvinger	3–2	4–0	5–1	—	0–1	1–2	2–0	2–1	4–2	3–1	1–3	1–1
Lillestrøm	5–0	3–1	1–2	2–1	—	2–2	3–0	2–2	3–1	4–0	1–0	0–0
Rosenborg	4–2	9–0	6–1	4–0	3–1	—	1–0	2–0	3–1	5–0	7–2	1–2
Sogndal	0–0	2–4	2–1	1–0	1–5	0–3	—	1–1	2–0	2–1	0–4	1–0
Start	1–1	1–1	4–0	0–1	1–1	1–1	2–1	—	7–0	3–1	3–1	2–1
Strømsgodset	0–2	0–2	2–0	2–3	0–2	0–7	2–1	1–1	—	0–0	4–1	1–0
Tromsø	0–0	0–1	2–0	3–0	2–0	1–1	0–0	0–1	2–1	—	1–0	1–1
VIF Fotball	1–1	3–2	3–2	0–1	0–0	1–1	0–1	0–2	2–2	4–0	—	2–2
Viking	4–2	3–2	1–0	4–1	2–0	1–2	3–1	3–2	3–1	0–2	5–2	—

Source: NIFS (in Norwegian)
Legend: Blue = home team win; Yellow = draw; Red = away team win.

== Season statistics ==
=== Top scorers ===
Rank	Player	Club	Goals
1	(Norway) Harald Martin Brattbakk	Rosenborg	17
2	(Norway) Petter Belsvik	Start	16
3	(Norway) Sigurd Rushfeldt	Tromsø	13
4	(Norway) Trond Egil Soltvedt	Brann	12
5	(Norway) Tore André Dahlum	Start	10
5	(Norway) Geir Frigård	Kongsvinger	10
7	(Norway) Kent Bergersen	Rosenborg	9
7	(Norway) Karl Petter Løken	Rosenborg	9
7	(Norway) Ståle Solbakken	Lillestrøm	9
10	(Norway) Knut Aga Jr.	VIF Fotball	8
10	(Norway) Øyvind Leonhardsen	Rosenborg	8
10	(Norway) Dag Riisnæs	Kongsvinger	8

=== Attendances ===
Pos	Team	Total	High	Low	Average	Change
1	Rosenborg	121,668	27,661	3,981	11,061	−5.9%
2	Brann	106,612	18,229	5,376	9,692	−7.5%
3	Viking	89,489	11,033	4,229	8,135	−6.3%
4	VIF Fotball	64,950	13,286	3,017	5,905	n/a^{1}
5	Start	58,076	8,630	3,246	5,280	−13.1%
6	Lillestrøm	57,917	8,339	2,594	5,265	−13.9%
7	Bodø/Glimt	50,347	6,778	3,452	4,577	−28.6%
8	Strømsgodset	49,831	6,514	2,206	4,530	n/a^{1}
9	Tromsø	48,272	6,805	2,353	4,388	−5.5%
10	Kongsvinger	38,770	6,242	1,988	3,525	+4.1%
11	HamKam	34,781	5,869	1,956	3,162	−10.6%
12	Sogndal	22,804	5,148	1,005	2,073	n/a^{1}
	League total	743,517	27,661	1,005	5,633	−5.7%

Source: nifs.no
Notes:
1: Team played last season in 1. divisjon.
