= 1990 Tippeligaen =

46th season of top-tier football league in Norway

Tippeligaen
- Season: 1990
- Dates: 28 April – 7 October
- Champions: Rosenborg; 6th title
- Relegated: VIF Fotball; Moss
- European Cup: Rosenborg
- Cup Winners' Cup: Fyllingen
- UEFA Cup: Tromsø
- Matches played: 132
- Goals scored: 400 (3.03 per match)
- Top goalscorer: Tore André Dahlum (20 goals)
- Biggest home win: Start 6–2 VIF Fotball (6 May 1990); Lillestrøm 4–0 Kongsvinger (6 May 1990); Viking 4–0 Strømsgodset (15 July 1990); Start 4–0 Kongsvinger (15 July 1990); Lillestrøm 4–0 Moss (22 July 1990); Rosenborg 4–0 Moss (5 August 1990); Rosenborg 4–0 Fyllingen (19 August 1990); Molde 6–2 Brann (26 August 1990); Moss 5–1 VIF Fotball (7 October 1990)
- Biggest away win: Molde 1–7 Rosenborg (8 September 1990)
- Highest scoring: Rosenborg 6–3 Strømsgodset (16 May 1990)
- Highest attendance: 22,865; Rosenborg 2–0 Brann (7 October 1990)
- Lowest attendance: 443; Moss 5–1 VIF Fotball (7 October 1990)
- Average attendance: 4,984 ▲5.4%

The 1990 Tippeligaen was the 46th completed season of top division football in Norway. The season began on 28 April 1990 and ended on 7 October 1990.

Twenty-two games were played with 3 points given for each win and 1 for each draw. Number eleven and twelve were relegated. The winners of the two groups of the 2. divisjon was promoted, as well as the winner of a series of play-off matches between the two second placed teams in the two groups of the 2. divisjon and number ten in Tippeligaen.

This was the first year the top flight of Norwegian football would be called Tippeligaen, from its sponsor, Norsk Tipping. However, the league was still unofficially known by its former name 1. divisjon in the general public. And by the end of the season, it was decided to let the second level of Norwegian football inherit the name 1. divisjon from the 1991 season to strengthen Tippeligaen as a brand.

== Teams and locations ==
Note: Table lists in alphabetical order.

Team	Ap.	Location	Stadium
Brann	34	Bergen	Brann Stadion
Fyllingen	1	Bergen	Varden Amfi
Kongsvinger	8	Kongsvinger	Gjemselund Stadion
Lillestrøm	27	Lillestrøm	Åråsen Stadion
Molde	16	Molde	Molde Stadion
Moss	16	Moss	Melløs Stadion
Rosenborg	27	Trondheim	Lerkendal Stadion
Start	22	Kristiansand	Kristiansand Stadion
Strømsgodset	12	Drammen	Marienlyst Stadion
Tromsø	5	Tromsø	Alfheim Stadion
VIF Fotball	35	Oslo	Bislett Stadion
Viking	41	Stavanger	Stavanger Stadion

== League table ==
Pos	Team	Pld	W	D	L	GF	GA	GD	Pts	Qualification or relegation
1	Rosenborg (C)	22	13	5	4	60	24	+36	44	Qualification for the European Cup first round
2	Tromsø	22	12	6	4	36	21	+15	42	Qualification for the UEFA Cup first round
3	Molde	22	12	4	6	34	29	+5	40	
4	Brann	22	11	6	5	34	25	+9	39	
5	Viking	22	10	5	7	41	30	+11	35	
6	Start	22	9	4	9	39	34	+5	31	
7	Fyllingen	22	7	7	8	23	30	−7	28	Qualification for the Cup Winners' Cup first round
8	Kongsvinger	22	7	6	9	24	32	−8	27	
9	Strømsgodset	22	8	3	11	29	45	−16	27	
10	Lillestrøm (O)	22	7	4	11	30	30	0	25	Qualification for the relegation play-offs
11	VIF Fotball (R)	22	4	4	14	26	53	−27	16	Relegation to First Division
12	Moss (R)	22	3	4	15	24	47	−23	13	Relegation to First Division

Source: fotball.no
Rules for classification: 1) points; 2) goal difference; 3) number of goals scored.
(C) Champions; (O) Play-off winners; (R) Relegated

== Results ==
Home \ Away	BRA	FYL	KON	LIL	MOL	MOS	ROS	IKS	STM	TRO	VIK	VIF
Brann	—	2–3	1–2	4–1	0–0	0–0	3–1	0–0	5–2	3–0	2–1	1–0
Fyllingen	0–0	—	2–1	0–0	2–2	1–0	1–1	4–1	2–0	0–2	1–3	2–0
Kongsvinger	1–1	1–1	—	3–1	1–3	3–0	0–2	3–1	2–1	0–0	1–0	3–0
Lillestrøm	1–1	1–1	4–0	—	3–1	4–0	2–1	1–0	0–1	0–0	2–4	4–1
Molde	6–2	2–0	1–0	3–2	—	1–1	1–7	1–0	0–2	1–0	2–3	4–1
Moss	0–2	1–2	3–0	1–3	0–1	—	2–2	3–2	2–4	1–2	1–2	5–1
Rosenborg	2–0	4–0	2–0	3–0	0–1	4–0	—	4–1	6–3	0–0	2–2	4–1
Start	3–1	1–1	4–0	1–0	2–0	3–0	2–4	—	1–1	1–3	3–2	6–2
Strømsgodset	0–1	2–0	0–0	1–0	1–3	1–0	2–1	1–5	—	2–3	2–1	2–2
Tromsø	0–1	3–0	3–1	2–1	0–0	3–1	1–3	1–1	3–0	—	3–1	3–1
Viking	1–2	1–0	1–1	1–0	2–0	5–2	1–1	2–0	4–0	1–1	—	1–2
VIF Fotball	1–2	2–0	1–1	1–0	0–1	1–1	1–6	0–1	4–1	2–3	2–2	—

Source: NIFS (in Norwegian)
Legend: Blue = home team win; Yellow = draw; Red = away team win.

== Relegation play-offs ==
The qualification matches were contested between Lillestrøm (10th in Tippeligaen), Bryne (2nd in the 2. divisjon - Group A), and Eik-Tønsberg (2nd in the 2. divisjon - Group B). Lillestrøm won and stayed in Tippeligaen.

Results

- Match 1: Bryne 5–1 Eik-Tønsberg
- Match 2: Eik-Tønsberg 1–3 Lillestrøm
- Match 3: Lillestrøm 2–0 Bryne

Table

Pos	Team	Pld	W	D	L	GF	GA	GD	Pts	Qualification or relegation
1	Lillestrøm (O)	2	2	0	0	5	1	+4	6	Remained in the Tippeligaen
2	Bryne	2	1	0	1	5	3	+2	3	Remained in the First Division
3	Eik-Tønsberg	2	0	0	2	2	8	−6	0	Remained in the First Division

Source: rsssf.no
(O) Play-off winners

== Season statistics ==
=== Top scorers ===
Rank	Player	Club	Goals
1	(Norway) Tore André Dahlum	Start	20
2	(Norway) Jahn Ivar Jakobsen	Rosenborg	17
3	(Republic of Ireland) Mike McCabe	Tromsø	13
4	(Norway) Petter Belsvik	Molde	12
4	(Norway) Halvor Storskogen	Strømsgodset	12
6	(Norway) Per Hilmar Nybø	Brann	11
7	(Sweden) Kjell Jonevret	Viking	9
8	(Norway) Sten Glenn Håberg	Start	8
8	(Norway) Roger Nilsen	Viking	8
8	(Norway) Gøran Sørloth	Rosenborg	8
8	(Norway) Alf Kåre Tveit	Viking	8

=== Attendances ===
Pos	Team	Total	High	Low	Average	Change
1	Rosenborg	122,260	22,865	6,687	11,115	−7.9%
2	Brann	95,026	14,118	4,205	8,639	+10.0%
3	Viking	72,414	12,141	3,608	6,583	+6.3%
4	Strømsgodset	58,380	8,990	3,350	5,307	n/a^{2}
5	Tromsø	56,263	7,012	2,771	5,115	+3.4%
6	Start	54,644	8,139	3,112	4,968	+28.2%
7	Fyllingen	39,784	9,606	1,247	3,617	n/a^{2}
8	VIF Fotball	38,319	7,253	550	3,484	−7.3%
9	Molde	37,059	4,308	2,197	3,369	−2.5%
10	Lillestrøm	34,298	5,392	1,570	3,118	−38.3%
11	Kongsvinger	24,869	3,258	1,231	2,261	−9.8%
12	Moss	24,542	4,093	443	2,231	−15.8%
	League total	657,858	22,865	443	4,984	+5.4%

Source: nifs.no
Notes:
2: Team played last season in 2. divisjon.
