= 1995 Norwegian Football Cup final =

- Event: 1995 Norwegian Football Cup
Rosenborg	Brann
Rosenborg	Brann
1	1
- After extra time
- Date: 29 October 1995
- Venue: Ullevaal Stadion, Oslo
- Referee: Jon Skjervold
- Attendance: 27,561

Replay
Rosenborg	Brann
3	1
- Date: 5 November 1995
- Venue: Ullevaal Stadion, Oslo
- Referee: Rune Pedersen
- Attendance: 20,076

The 1995 Norwegian Football Cup final was the final match of the 1995 Norwegian Football Cup, the 90th season of the Norwegian Football Cup, the premier Norwegian football cup competition organized by the Football Association of Norway (NFF). The final was played at the Ullevaal Stadion in Oslo, and opposed two Tippeligaen sides, Rosenborg and Brann. As the inaugural final match finished 1–1, the final was replayed seven days later at the same venue, where Rosenborg defeated Brann 3–1 to claim the Norwegian Cup for a seventh time in their history.

== Route to the final ==
Rosenborg			Round	Brann		
National	8–0 (A)		Round 1	Nest-Sotra	4–2 (A)	
Byåsen	5–0 (H)		Round 2	Stord	7–1 (H)	
Alta	6–2 (A)		Round 3	Fyllingen	3–1 (A)	
Eik-Tønsberg	1–1 aet (A)	4–1 (H)	Round 4	Bryne	3–1 (H)	
Start	2–0 (H)		Quarterfinal	Lyn	4–1 (H)	
Hødd	5–0 (A)	2–1 (H)	Semifinal	Lillestrøm	1–3 (A)	4–1 (H)

== Matches ==
=== First match details ===
29 October 1995
13:15 CET (UTC+1)

Brann	1–1 (a.e.t.)	Rosenborg
Strandli 72' (pen.)	Report	Strand 61'

Ullevaal Stadion, Oslo
Attendance: 27,561
Referee: Jon Skjervold (Fet)

Brann	Rosenborg

Brann:
GK	(Norway) Vidar Bahus
DF	(Norway) Geirmund Brendesæter	(substituted off) 112'
DF	(Norway) Roger Helland
DF	(Norway) Inge Ludvigsen
DF	(Norway) Claus Lundekvam
MF	(Iceland) Ágúst Gylfason
MF	(Sweden) Magnus Johansson	Booked
MF	(Norway) Per-Ove Ludvigsen
MF	(Norway) Geir Hasund	Booked
FW	(Norway) Eivind Karlsbakk	(yellow card) (yellow-red card)
FW	(Norway) Frank Strandli
Substitution:
MF	(Norway) Eirik Skjælaaen	(substituted on) 112'
Coach:
(Norway) Kjell Tennfjord

Rosenborg:
GK	(Norway) Ola By Rise
DF	(Norway) Karl Petter Løken
DF	(Norway) Erik Hoftun
DF	(Norway) Bjørn Otto Bragstad	Booked
DF	(Norway) Ståle Stensaas
MF	(Norway) Roar Strand	(substituted off) 110'
MF	(Norway) Bent Skammelsrud	Booked
MF	(Norway) Trond Egil Soltvedt	(substituted off) 67'
FW	(Norway) Steffen Iversen	Booked
FW	(Norway) Harald Martin Brattbakk
FW	(Norway) Mini Jakobsen
Substitutions:
DF	(Norway) Vegard Heggem	(substituted on) 10'
DF	(Norway) Tom Kåre Staurvik	(substituted on) 67'
Coach:
(Norway) Nils Arne Eggen

=== Replay match details ===
5 November 1995
13:15 CET (UTC+1)

Rosenborg	3–1	Brann
Staurvik 23' (pen.); Hoftun 37'; Iversen 50'	Report	Ludvigsen 21'

Ullevaal Stadion, Oslo
Attendance: 20,076
Referee: Rune Pedersen (Sprint/Jeløy)

Rosenborg	Brann

Rosenborg:
GK	(Norway) Jørn Jamtfall
DF	(Norway) Karl Petter Løken
DF	(Norway) Tom Kåre Staurvik
DF	(Norway) Bjørn Otto Bragstad
DF	(Norway) Ståle Stensaas
MF	(Norway) Roar Strand	(substituted off) 90'
MF	(Norway) Bent Skammelsrud
MF	(Norway) Vegard Heggem	(substituted off) 90'
FW	(Norway) Steffen Iversen
FW	(Norway) Harald Martin Brattbakk
FW	(Norway) Mini Jakobsen	(substituted off) 90'
Substitutions:
DF	(Norway) Espen Solheim	(substituted on) 90'
MF	(Norway) Jon Olav Hjelde	(substituted on) 90'
MF	(Norway) Arne Winsnes	(substituted on) 90'
Coach:
(Norway) Nils Arne Eggen

Brann:
GK	(Norway) Vidar Bahus
DF	(Norway) Geirmund Brendesæter	Booked
DF	(Norway) Roger Helland
DF	(Norway) Inge Ludvigsen
DF	(Norway) Claus Lundekvam
MF	(Iceland) Ágúst Gylfason
MF	(Norway) Lars Bakkerud
MF	(Norway) Per-Ove Ludvigsen
MF	(Norway) Eirik Skjælaaen	(substituted off) 67'
FW	(Norway) Eivind Karlsbakk	(substituted off) 57'
FW	(Norway) Frank Strandli
Substitutions:
DF	(Norway) Erik Johannessen	(substituted on) 57'
FW	(Sweden) Roger Nordstrand	(substituted on) 67'
Coach:
(Norway) Kjell Tennfjord
