= 1999 Norwegian Football Cup final =

- Event: 1999 Norwegian Football Cup
Rosenborg	Brann
2	0
- Date: 30 October 1999
- Venue: Ullevaal Stadion, Oslo
- Referee: Terje Hauge
- Attendance: 25,296

The 1999 Norwegian Football Cup final was the final match of the 1999 Norwegian Football Cup, the 94th season of the Norwegian Football Cup, the premier Norwegian football cup competition organized by the Football Association of Norway (NFF). The match was played on 30 October 1999 at the Ullevaal Stadion in Oslo, and opposed two Tippeligaen sides Rosenborg and Brann. Rosenborg defeated Brann 2–0 to claim the Norwegian Cup for an eighth time in their history.

== Route to the final ==
Rosenborg			Round	Brann		
Melhus	A	3–0	Round 1	Nordhordland	A	3–0
Ranheim	H	5–0	Round 2	Fana	A	2–0
Narvik	A	9–1	Round 3	Ørsta	H	3–1
Moss	H	4–1	Round 4	Vålerenga	A	3–1
Lyn	A	2–1	Quarterfinal	Odd Grenland	H	3–2
Tromsø	H	2–1	Semifinal	Molde	A	4–3 aet

== Match ==
=== Details ===
30 October 1999
16:00 CEST (UTC+2)

Rosenborg	2–0	Brann
Sørensen 49', 56'	Report

Ullevaal Stadion, Oslo
Attendance: 25,296
Referee: Tom Henning Øvrebø (Nordstrand)

Rosenborg	Brann

Rosenborg:
GK	1	(Norway) Jørn Jamtfall		(substituted off) 90'
DF	2	(Norway) André Bergdølmo
DF	4	(Norway) Bjørn Otto Bragstad
DF	6	(Norway) Roar Strand	(yellow card) 33'
DF	3	(Norway) Erik Hoftun
MF	19	(Norway) Fredrik Winsnes	(yellow card) 64'
MF	10	(Norway) Bent Skammelsrud
MF	7	(Norway) Ørjan Berg		(substituted off) 90'
FW	8	(Norway) Jan-Derek Sørensen
FW	9	(Norway) John Carew
FW	11	(Norway) Mini Jakobsen		(substituted off) 69'
Substitutes:
GK	12	(Iceland) Árni Gautur Arason		(substituted in) 90'
DF		(Norway) Christer Basma
DF	20	(Norway) Bent Inge Johnsen		(substituted in) 90'
FW	21	(Norway) Tore André Dahlum		(substituted in) 69'
MF		(Norway) Ole Johan Singsdal
MF		(Norway) Øyvind Storflor
FW		(Norway) Tor Hogne Aarøy
Coach:
(Norway) Nils Arne Eggen

Brann:
GK	12	(Sweden) Magnus Kihlstedt
DF	9	(Norway) Geirmund Brendesæter
DF	16	(Norway) Per-Ove Ludvigsen
DF	6	(Finland) Harri Ylönen	(yellow card) 67'	(substituted off) 90'
DF	4	(Norway) Arne Vidar Moen
MF	2	(Norway) Cato Guntveit
MF	5	(Norway) Roger Helland
MF	21	(Norway) Jan Ove Pedersen
MF	17	(Sweden) Svante Samuelsson
MF	27	(Norway) Raymond Kvisvik
FW	22	(Norway) Thorstein Helstad		(substituted off) 88'
Substitutes:
GK		(Norway) Vidar Bahus
MF		(Norway) John Erik Indrebø
FW	18	(Norway) Azar Karadas		(substituted in) 88'
FW		(Norway) Mika Kottila
FW	11	(Norway) Mons Ivar Mjelde		(substituted in) 90'
DF		(Norway) Egil Ulfstein
DF		(Norway) Roy Wassberg
Coach:
(Norway) Harald Aabrekk
