= 1990 Norwegian Football Cup final =

- Event: 1990 Norwegian Football Cup
Fyllingen	Rosenborg
1	5
- Date: 21 October 1990
- Venue: Ullevaal Stadion, Oslo
- Referee: Arild Haugstad
- Attendance: 28,000

The 1990 Norwegian Football Cup final was the final match of the 1990 Norwegian Football Cup, the 85th season of the Norwegian Football Cup, the premier Norwegian football cup competition organized by the Football Association of Norway (NFF). The match was played on 21 October 1990 at the Ullevaal Stadion in Oslo, and opposed two Tippeligaen sides Fyllingen and Rosenborg. Rosenborg defeated Fyllingen 5–1 to claim the Norwegian Cup for a fifth time in their history.

== Route to the final ==
Fyllingen			Round	Rosenborg		
Løv-Ham	H	2–1	Round 1	Nardo	A	1–0
Vadmyra	A	4–2	Round 2	Steinkjer	A	7–1
Stord	H	2–0	Round 3	Namsos	H	4–1
Aalesund	A	1–0	Round 4	Strømmen	H	3–2 aet
Start	H	1–0	Quarterfinal	Tromsø	A	1–0
Brann	H	2–0	Semifinal	Kongsvinger	H	1–0

== Match ==
=== Details ===
21 October 1990
13:15 CET (UTC+1)

Fyllingen	1–5	Rosenborg
Tengs 89'	Report	Løken 13', 59'; Sørloth 20'; Jakobsen 28'; Ingebrigtsen 67'

Ullevaal Stadion, Oslo
Attendance: 28,000
Referee: Arild Haugstad (Faaberg)

Fyllingen	Rosenborg

Fyllingen:
GK	(Norway) Vidar Bahus
DF	(Norway) Tom Leiknes
DF	(Norway) Inge Ludvigsen
DF	(Norway) Per-Ove Ludvigsen	(substituted off) 67'
DF	(Norway) Gunnar Ingebrigtsen	(substituted off) 50'
MF	(Norway) Hans Brandtun
MF	(Norway) Dag Bergset
MF	(Norway) Håkon Knutsen	Booked
MF	(Norway) Asbjørn Helgeland
FW	(Norway) Tor Vikenes
FW	(Norway) Ola Lyngvær
Substitution:
MF	(Norway) Kjell Rune Pedersen	(substituted in) 50'
MF	(Norway) Paul Tengs	(substituted in) 67'
Coach:
(Norway) Kjell Tennfjord

Rosenborg:
GK	(Norway) Ola By Rise
DF	(Norway) Øivind Husby
DF	(Norway) Trond Sollied
DF	(Norway) Knut Torbjørn Eggen
DF	(Norway) Trond Henriksen
MF	(Norway) Kåre Ingebrigtsen
MF	(Norway) Sverre Brandhaug
MF	(Norway) Ørjan Berg	(substituted off) 80'
MF	(Norway) Karl Petter Løken	(substituted off) 75'
FW	(Norway) Gøran Sørloth
FW	(Norway) Mini Jakobsen
Substitutes:
GK	(Norway) Frode Olsen
DF	(Norway) Bjørn Otto Bragstad
DF	(Norway) Leif Nordli
MF	(Norway) Runar Berg	(substituted in) 80'
MF	(Norway) Roar Strand	(substituted in) 75'
Coach:
(Norway) Nils Arne Eggen
