= Petter Hagen =

Norwegian footballer (born 1969)

Personal information
- Full name: Petter Andreas Hagen
- Date of birth: 8 September 1969 (age 57)
- Positions: Left back; left winger

Youth career
- 1975–1986: Aalesund

Senior career*
| Years | Team | Apps | (Gls) |
| 1986–1989 | Aalesund | | |
| 1990–1992 | Fyllingen | | |
| 1992 | → Aalesund (loan) | | |
| 1993 | Aalesund | | |
| 1994–1996 | Hødd | | |
| 1997–1998 | Aalesund | | |

International career
| 1987 | Norway U19 | 4 | (1) |
| 1990 | Norway U21 | 3 | (1) |
- * Club domestic league appearances and goals

Petter Andreas Hagen (born 8 September 1969) is a retired Norwegian footballer who played as a back and winger. He spent the seasons 1990, 1991 and 1995 in the highest Norwegian league Eliteserien for Fyllingen and Hødd.

== Early career ==
He played youth and senior football for Aalesunds FK. Hagen made his senior debut for Aalesund against Start in July 1986. His first start came in October 1987 versus Lyn. In 1987 he was also selected for Norway U19 and scored his first international goal against Poland U19.

== First stint in Eliteserien ==
After the 1989 season, "the youth international player with the feared left foot" joined the newly promoted first-tier club Fyllingen. During the off-season, Hagen would start his compulsory military service as a recruit at Madlamoen, but then do the rest of his service at Haakonsvern in Bergen, where Fyllingen is located. Aalesund's former manager Egil Olsen had left the club as well, in order to take over Norway U21. Hagen subsequently became the first ever international player of Fyllingen, when Olsen selected him for the Norway U21 training camp in Iraq. The selection happened one week before Operation Desert Storm, but the training camp went through regardless. Hagen even scored against Iraq, but as the teams faced each other again, Iraq won 1–0.

As Fyllingen's pre-season progressed, Bergens Arbeiderblad praised his speed, technique and view and wrote that Hagen might break through in the highest league. The newspaper also rated the mood in Fyllingen's squad highly, with Hagen being an important contributor. The local press regarded the results in the pre-season friendlies as very promising. Fyllingen thrashed Start 4–1 as the club, and Petter Hagen, made their debut in the highest league. Hagen even made Dagbladet's "team of the round" together with teammates Vidar Bahus and Per Ove Ludvigsen. Despite this, the reality of playing in the highest league soon proved tough for Fyllingen. Petter Hagen was among the players who did not live up to the expectations of the local press. The team had a stronger run in the summer, but Hagen missed several matches from injury. He suspected that the rather hard playing surface, the first-generation artificial turf of Fyllingen's home ground Varden Amfi, played a significant part in that.

In addition, Fyllingen progressed through the 1990 Norwegian Football Cup, including an away game against Hagen's old club Aalesund. Hagen did not play in the 1990 Norwegian Football Cup final which Fyllingen lost.

The 1991 season became a failure, with Petter Hagen not playing a single league match for Fyllingen. Injuries kept him sidelined for most of the season. After the season, he also confessed to spending too much time in Bergen's nightlife, being recognized out on the town as a minor local celebrity. Hagen was also fined two times by Fyllingen for staying out less than 48 hours before B team matches.

== Return to Sunnmøre ==
In 1992 he was loaned out to Aalesund, where he had "convinced" during pre-season training. The transfer was made permanent in 1993. The transfer fee was only 30,000 kr, dropping from 100,000 kr when Fyllingen initially signed the player.

Sunnmørsposten graded every player of the two local teams, Aalesund and Hødd, after every match. When the 1993 1. divisjon was halfway, Hagen had the highest grades among Aalesund's players with 4.75 out of 10. Aalesund were relegated in 1993. Hagen had meetings with Moss FK, but joined Aalesund's southern neighbours IL Hødd. The transfer fee was set to 85,000 kr. The sum included money to Fyllingen, and the transfer also entailed third-party sale percentages.

Hødd had a successful 1994 season, where Hagen scored some goals as he was designated Hødd's penalty kick taker. Hødd won promotion from the 1994 1. divisjon, giving Hagen another try at Eliteserien in 1995.

Here, however, he started missing matches in June due to a painful achilles tendon. After the 1995 season he needed surgery on both his achilles tendons, which had chronic inflammations. There were also talks about Hagen joining Bryne FK, which did not materialize.

After the 1996 season, Hagen was released by Hødd. He trained with Aalesund, who were looking to sign the player for a third spell in the team, despite his «countless injuries». According to Sunnmørsposten, Hagen was approached by Viking FK in January 1997 to join the team immediately, but was rebuked because of his personal situation did not give room for Hagen to leave Ålesund. He thus signed for Aalesund. Hagen was considered as a left back, with Aalesund hoping Hagen would stay injury-free.

In 1997 he again missed parts of the season due to injury, and was also benched, but returned to the ultimate match of the season where Aalesund fought against relegation. Aalesund escaped with a margin of one point. Hagen retired in the summer of 1998.

== Post-playing career ==
Hagen started working as a teacher, but was also chosen to lead Aalesund's nominating committee. Tasked with finding candidates for the new board of directors, Hagen himself entered the board as director of sports. In addition to working with player logistics, he took part in community outreach, such as a campaign together with youth group Nei til ecstasy ("No to ecstasy"). Hagen served throughout 1999 before being replaced by Reidar Vågnes.

Having attended Volda University College, Hagen later moved to Rogaland and was a teacher in Kvernevik and then headmaster of Harestad School. In 2020 he was hired as municipal director of upbringing (kindergartens, primary education and child protection services) in Randaberg Municipality.
