= Erik Johannessen (footballer, born 1971) =

Norwegian footballer (born 1971)

Personal information
- Date of birth: 31 December 1971 (age 54)
- Height: 1.70 m (5 ft 7 in)
- Position: Left back

Youth career
- –1986: Åsane
- 1987–1990: Brann

Senior career*
Years	Team	Apps	(Gls)
1991–1997	Brann	41	(1)
1998–2004	Åsane		

International career
1989	Norway U18	1	(0)
- * Club domestic league appearances and goals

Erik Johannessen (born 31 December 1971) is a retired Norwegian football defender. Spending his entire career in Bergen, he played as a left back for the SK Brann that won the 1989 Norwegian U20 Cup and played seven seasons for their first team in the 1990s.

== Career ==
Hailing from Tertnes, he played youth football for Åsane until joining the junior team of SK Brann in 1987. In 1989 he won the Norwegian U20 Cup with Brann, playing alongside Roy Wassberg and Joachim Björklund in defence. In the same year, Johannessen was also selected for Norway U18, together with teammate Sondre Jensen, to play Sweden U18.

Johannessen was allowed to make his first-team debut in a friendly match against Bryne in 1991, followed by his league debut against Lyn and his cup debut against Haugar. By the summer of 1991, Johannessen had started several games. In 1992, Bergens Tidende opined that "last year's comet has not been able to live up to the expectations", and speculated whether he would go out on loan. He featured more regularly in 1994, and was tipped to contribute more frequently in 1995. By that time, he was a continuity player in Brann, being one of two players to have stayed for the last five seasons.

He played the 1995 Norwegian Football Cup final, which Brann lost, but which earned them the right to play in the 1996–97 UEFA Cup Winners' Cup. During that European cup run, he played as a substitute against PSV and Liverpool.

After Kjell Tennfjord took over as Brann manager, Johannessen was largely sidelined and did not play a single league game in 1996. In September 1997, Tennfjord announced that Johannessen would be released at the end of his contract. Bergens Tidende surmised that Johannessen stood little chance of continuing to play professionally. However, there were reports of second-tier club IK Start showing interest in Johannessen. Ahead of the 1998 season, Johannessen opted to stay in Bergen and join childhood club Åsane. In Åsane, he was described as a brain behind their buildup of the play. The team managed to win promotion to the 2002 1. divisjon before being relegated at the end of the year.

In 2004, Johannessen only played once due to injuries. He retired ahead of the 2005 season.

== Personal life ==
He is nicknamed "Tassen", referring to a lower-than-average height. His father Harald Johannessen was both a handballer and footballer, playing football for Brann from 1965 to 1971, whereas Eirik's brother Tore was a handballer and handball coach. After retiring, the three worked in Åsane Flis og Gulv, a tile business.

Erik Johannessen was known in the media as an ardent Liverpool F.C. fan, following the team since the 1977 FA Cup final. According to Johannessen, one of the groundworkers at Brann stadion even updated him on Liverpool scores during Brann games, should the games coincide. His favourite player was John Barnes, who Johannessen actually faced when Brann met Liverpool in the 1996–97 UEFA Cup Winners' Cup. Johannessen was also reported as being a prolific sports better. According to Bergensavisen, Johannessen was visibly "in ecstasy" during an Åsane game, having received the message that he won a large sum (betting on matches unrelated to himself).
