= Erik Johannessen =

Erik Johannessen may refer to:

- Erik Johannessen (musician) (born 1975), Norwegian musician and composer
- Erik Johannessen (footballer, born 1952), Norwegian former footballer
- Erik Johannessen (footballer, born 1984), Swedish footballer
- Erik Johannessen (footballer, born 1971), retired Norwegian footballer
- Erik Harry Johannessen (1902–1980), Norwegian painter
