= 1990 Norwegian Football Cup =

Norgesmesterskapet i fotball for herrer

Tournament details
- Country: Norway
- Teams: 128 (main competition)

Final positions
- Champions: Rosenborg (5th title)
- Runners-up: Fyllingen

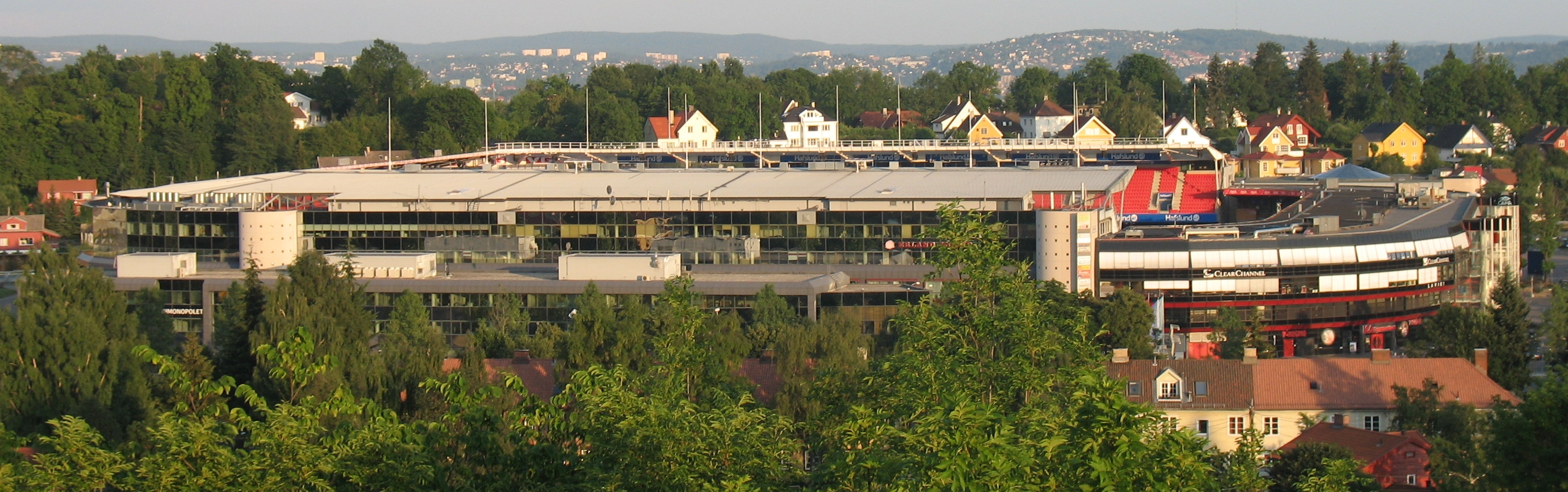
Ullevaal Stadion, Oslo - venue for the Norwegian Cup final

The 1990 Norwegian Football Cup was the 85th edition of the Norwegian Football Cup. The final took place at Ullevaal Stadion in Oslo on 21 October 1990. Rosenborg were won the Norwegian Cup after they defeated Fyllingen with the score 5–1. This was Rosenborg's fifth Norwegian Cup title.

== Calendar ==
Below are the dates for each round as given by the official schedule:

Round	Date(s)	Number of fixtures	Clubs
First Round	21–24 May 1990	64	128 → 64
Second Round	30–31 May 1990	32	64 → 32
Third Round	1 July 1990	16	32 → 16
Fourth Round	25 July 1990	9	16 → 8
Quarter-finals	15 August 1990	4	8 → 4
Semi-finals	15–16 September 1990	2	4 → 2
Final	21 October 1990	1	2 → 1

== First round ==
Team 1	Score	Team 2
21 May 1990
Stokke	1–1 (3–1 p)	Urædd
22 May 1990
Ås	0–3	Moss
23 May 1990
Skjold	0–3	Haugar
Donn	5–1	Vigør
Stranda	1–0	Stryn
Kopervik	1–0	Djerv 1919
Ulf-Sandnes	3–0	Bryne
Ørn-Horten	2–1	Falk
Mjøndalen	1–0	Runar
Elverum	0–3	Nybergsund
Clausenengen	1–0	Surnadal
Fjøra	1–4	Sogndal
Nardo	0–1	Rosenborg
Nidelv	0–3 (a.e.t.)	Steinkjer
Strindheim	3–1 (a.e.t.)	KIL/Hemne
24 May 1990
Os	1–0	Lyngbø
Figgjo	1–4 (a.e.t.)	Viking
Egersund	4–4 (3–1 p)	Eiger
Pors	1–2	Jerv
Bjerkreim	1–6	Start
Skade	1–4	Sandefjord BK
Eid	1–3	Volda
Hødd	4–0	Skarbøvik
Brattvåg	1–2	Aalesund
Vadmyra	2–0	Åsane
Fyllingen	2–1	Løv-Ham
Vard Haugesund	1–2	Stord
Ålgård	1–0	Randaberg
Bjørnar	0–3	Brann
Klepp	1–0	Vidar
Sprint/Jeløy	0–2	Selbak
Skeid	2–4	Lyn
Andenes	0–1	Narvik/Nor
Grovfjord	0–6	Mjølner
Brønnøysund	0–4	Stålkameratene
Bodø/Glimt	2–1	Harstad
Larvik Turn	3–5 (a.e.t.)	Odd
Gjerdrum	0–4	Lillestrøm
Ready	5–0	Aurskog/Finstadbru
Nordkjosbotn	0–3	Tromsdalen
Skarp	3–2	Kautokeino
Polarstjernen	0–3	Tromsø
Fauske/Sprint	3–1	Gevir/Vinkelen
Frigg	0–1	Bærum
Råde	4–2	Tistedalen
Drafn	1–5	Vålerenga
Drøbak/Frogn	4–0	Lørenskog
Mosjøen	2–2 (1–4 p)	Namsos
Nessegutten	2–0	Stjørdals/Blink
Høland	0–3	Strømmen
Sarpsborg FK	2–0	Fredrikstad
Tynset	1–2 (a.e.t.)	Melhus
Faaberg	2–0	Løten
Kjellmyra	0–3	Kongsvinger
Bjørkelangen	2–1	Askim
Molde	3–0	Sunndal
Åndalsnes	2–0	Kristiansund
Redalen	0–1	Raufoss
Ullern	0–1	Strømsgodset
Fram Larvik	5–1	Slemmestad
Eik-Tønsberg	2–1	Åssiden
Vind	1–2	HamKam
Kjelsås	1–0	Asker
30 May 1990
Sel	3–1	Alvdal

== Second round ==
Team 1	Score	Team 2
30 May 1990
Viking	8–0	Egersund
Jerv	1–5	Start
Vadmyra	2–4	Fyllingen
Brann	4–0	Klepp
Selbak	0–2	Lyn
Lillestrøm	4–2	Ready
Tromsø	6–0	Fauske/Sprint
Steinkjer	1–7	Rosenborg
Melhus	0–1	Strindheim
Kongsvinger	6–0	Bjørkelangen
Clausenengen	0–3	Molde
HamKam	5–0	Kjelsås
31 May 1990
Vålerenga	2–1	Drøbak/Frogn
6 June 1990
Haugar	2–0	Os
Sandefjord BK	3–2	Donn
Volda	2–4 (a.e.t.)	Hødd
Aalesund	5–3 (a.e.t.)	Stranda
Stord	2–0	Kopervik
Ålgård	3–3 (10–11 p)	Ulf-Sandnes
Moss	1–1 (4–3 p)	Ørn-Horten
Narvik/Nor	0–2	Mjølner
Stålkameratene	1–2	Bodø/Glimt
Odd	3–2 (a.e.t.)	Mjøndalen
Tromsdalen	0–0 (2–3 p)	Skarp
Bærum	1–2	Råde
Namsos	1–0	Nessegutten
Strømmen	3–0	Sarpsborg FK
Nybergsund	1–2 (a.e.t.)	Faaberg
Åndalsnes	0–0 (3–1 p)	Sel
Raufoss	0–4	Sogndal
Strømsgodset	4–1	Stokke
Fram Larvik	1–4	Eik-Tønsberg

== Third round ==
Team 1	Score	Team 2
1 July 1990
Haugar	0–2	Viking
Start	4–0	Sandefjord BK
Hødd	1–3	Aalesund
Fyllingen	2–0	Stord
Ulf-Sandnes	0–1 (a.e.t.)	Brann
Lyn	2–1	Moss
Mjølner	3–1	Bodø/Glimt
Odd	0–6	Lillestrøm
Skarp	0–2	Tromsø
Råde	4–1	Vålerenga
Rosenborg	4–1	Namsos
Strømmen	6–0	Strindheim
Faaberg	0–1 (a.e.t.)	Kongsvinger
Molde	6–2	Åndalsnes
Sogndal	4–1 (a.e.t.)	Strømsgodset
Eik-Tønsberg	2–1 (a.e.t.)	HamKam

== Fourth round ==
25 July 1990

Viking	0–1	Start
		Skårdal 65'

Stavanger Stadion, Stavanger
Attendance: 7,177
Referee: Terje Hauge

25 July 1990

Aalesund	0–1	Fyllingen
		K. R. Pedersen 10'

Kråmyra Stadion, Ålesund
Attendance: 1,800
Referee: Thorodd Presberg

25 July 1990

Brann	3–2	Lyn
Thordarson 83'; Mjelde 88'; Nybø 90'		Fodstad 6'; Thomassen 60'

Brann Stadion, Bergen
Attendance: 4,119
Referee: Erling Haugen

25 July 1990

Lillestrøm	1–1 (a.e.t.)	Mjølner
Amundsen 90+3'		S. B. Johansen 54'

Åråsen Stadion, Lillestrøm
Attendance: 1,763
Referee: Roy Helge Olsen

25 July 1990

Tromsø	5–0	Råde
Espejord 33'; T. Johansen 45'; McCabe 61'; B. Johansen 81'; Jenssen 87'

Alfheim Stadion, Tromsø
Attendance: 1,418
Referee: Jan Erik Olsen

25 July 1990

Rosenborg	3–2 (a.e.t.)	Strømmen
Løken 35' (pen.); Jakobsen 95'; Berg 115'		Bakke 14'; Aga Jr. 119'

Lerkendal Stadion, Trondheim
Attendance: 4,981
Referee: Einar Halle

25 July 1990

Kongsvinger	1–0	Molde
Riisnæs 54'

Sandermoen Stadion, Sander
Attendance: 1,165
Referee: Bjørn Kronborg

25 July 1990

Sogndal	2–1 (a.e.t.)	Eik-Tønsberg
Førde 17', 112'		Johnsen 47'

Fosshaugane, Sogndalsfjøra
Attendance: 1,302
Referee: Kjell Nordby

=== Replay ===
8 August 1990

Mjølner	0–4	Lillestrøm
		Frigård 12'; Arnevåg 54' (pen.); J. O. Pedersen 63'; Osvold 82' (pen.)

Narvik Stadion, Narvik
Attendance: 4,126
Referee: Egil Nervik

== Quarter-finals ==
15 August 1990

Start	0–1	Fyllingen
		Lyngvær 88'

Kristiansand Stadion, Kristiansand
Attendance: 7,308
Referee: Sven Kjelbrott

15 August 1990

Brann	4–2	Lillestrøm
Filipczak 22'; Hadler-Olsen 66'; Mjelde 81', 84'		Bjarmann 87'; Gulbrandsen 90'

Brann Stadion, Bergen
Attendance: 13,136
Referee: Christian Raabe

15 August 1990

Tromsø	0–1	Rosenborg
		Løken 20'

Alfheim Stadion, Tromsø
Attendance: 10,225
Referee: Arild Haugstad

15 August 1990

Kongsvinger	3–2 (a.e.t.)	Sogndal
Sannerholt 10'; Bjørnebye 92'; Dalløkken 108'		Opseth 61'; Hillestad 111'

Gjemselund Stadion, Kongsvinger
Attendance: 2,611
Referee: Tore Hollung

== Semi-finals ==
15 September 1990

Fyllingen	2–0	Brann
Lyngvær 53', 65'

Varden Kunstgress, Bergen
Attendance: 10,124
Referee: Einar Halle

16 September 1990

Rosenborg	1–0	Kongsvinger
Løken 6'

Lerkendal Stadion, Trondheim
Attendance: 27,497
Referee: Rune Pedersen

== Final ==
21 October 1990
13:15 CET (UTC+1)

Fyllingen	1–5	Rosenborg
Tengs 89'	Report	Løken 13', 59'; Sørloth 20'; Jakobsen 28'; Ingebrigtsen 67'

Ullevaal Stadion, Oslo
Attendance: 28,000
Referee: Arild Haugstad (Faaberg)
