= Knut Erik Folland =

Norwegian footballer (born 1972)

Personal information
- Date of birth: 5 March 1972 (age 54)
- Positions: Central defender; right back

Youth career
- Gaular

Senior career*
Years	Team	Apps	(Gls)
–1989	Gaular		
1990–1991	Førde		
1992	Os		
1993–1996	HamKam		
1997	Elverum		
1997–2000	Førde		
2001–2002	Os		

Managerial career
- 2007–2014: Førde
- 2015: Vard Haugesund
- 2017: Førde (assistant)
- 2018: Florø (coach)
- 2023: Førde (coach)
- * Club domestic league appearances and goals

Knut Erik Folland (born 5 March 1972) is a retired Norwegian football defender and later manager. He notably played in Norway's highest league Eliteserien for Hamkam, and on the second tier for Hamkam and Os; later coaching Førde and Vard Haugesund.

== Career ==
Hailing from Sande i Sunnfjord, he played in the Sixth Division for Gaular. He was given a 2,000 kr grant in 1989 to support his football training, and in early 1990, Folland spent half a year at a football academy in Alcudia. Ahead of the 1990 season he joined a larger team in Sunnfjord, Førde IL. Folland started his first Førde game in August 1990, playing sweeper. The game ended in a 0–7 loss to Åsane.

To try his luck on a higher level, Folland went on trial with Os TF in the 1992 pre-season, and was given a contract with the second-tier team. Until he finished school, he would commute between Førde and Os. Folland made his debut for Os at Haugesund stadion in May 1992 against Haugar. Two newspapers declared Folland as the best Os player of the match and "brilliant", respectively.

Because he started his compulsory military service at Jørstadmoen in 1992, Folland contacted Eliteserien club Hamarkameratene. He was allowed to train with Hamkam from December 1992, and during the winter he managed to make his way into the first team squad, featuring regularly in the pre-season friendlies.

In the fall of 1993, he was offered a new contract. Manager Peter Engelbrektsson praised his technique, tactical and jumping skills, but added that Folland was under development and needed more strength. In the 1994 Eliteserien, Folland notably started in central defense against Lillestrøm in May 1994, as central defender Leif Nordli could not make the game in time. VG expressed surprise that Folland was still standing, after a last-ditch effort by goalkeeper Frode Grodås to convert a corner kick. Grodås "smashed into Folland as a tanker truck", a "senseless assault".

Folland started his first game of the 1995 Eliteserien against Brann, but was sent off in a clear loss. Nonetheless he continued starting games, with his breakthrough seeming imminent. He was sidelined in favour of Stian Hagelund in late August. Ham-Kam were relegated at the end of 1995. Continuing for one year, after the 1996 1. divisjon season, Ham-Kam did not renew the contract with Folland. Being released came as a surprise to him, but after Ham-Kam started playing in the First Division, he had enrolled at Hedmark University College in Elverum to have something to fall back on.

Folland was set to join Elverum Fotball ahead of the 1997 season, though he was also contacted by Førde. The transfer deal was finally resolved in April 1997. For Elverum, Folland was a key member of the team owing to his abilities in directing the play, both through passing as well as verbally. When the school year 1997–98 commenced, Folland left Elverum to continue his education at Sogn og Fjordane University College.

By the 2000s, Folland had started an education in ergotherapy. In 2001 he found it necessary to move to Bergen to get an internship. He was wanted by Fyllingen, but as the Bergen-based club only wanted to utilize Folland in central defense, he got an offer from his former club Os which entailed playing as a central midfielder. Folland chose Os. He would go on loan from Førde, but never returned there as a player.

== Manager career ==
Folland became head coach of Førde IL in 2007. As the team had lingered seven seasons in the Third Division, Folland led Førde to promotion from the 2009 Norwegian Third Division. Though Førde were relegated from the 2011 Norwegian Second Division, they wo instant re-promotion in 2012, with Folland attempting to use the promotion as leverage to incur an investment to improve the playing facilities.

Folland announced his resignation in August 2014, effective after the end of the season. He was replaced by Torbjørn Glomnes.

Folland was wanted as head coach of SK Vard Haugesund, already in 2013, and was announced as Vard's new signing in October 2014. Folland stated that the goal was promotion to the First Division. The link between him and Vard was conceived through fellow manager Karl Oskar Emberland. Folland only lasted one season Vard due to the considerable distance away from his family.

Folland announced his retirement from coaching in 2016, but already in 2017 he returned to Førde IL as adviser and assistant. In 2018 he was a defense coach for Florø SK. He returned to help Førde in a coaching capacity in 2023.

== Personal life ==
Knut Erik Folland's daughter Mina Bell Folland played for Gaular IL and was selected for the Norwegian U14–16 youth national training camp. She made her debut for Toppserien in 2021 after joining Arna-Bjørnar, and moved on to Røa IL in January 2024.

From 2015, Folland worked with administrating the physicians' services in Sunnfjord Municipality. In January 2025, he took up an administrative position at Førde Hospital.
