= Wassberg =

Wassberg may refer to:

People

- Roy Wassberg, a Norwegian footballer, most known for his two runs in SK Brann
- Thomas Wassberg, a Swedish former cross-country skier

Places

- a mountain which is part of the Forch area in the canton of Zürich in Switzerland
