= Karlsbakk =

Karlsbakk is a surname. Notable people with the surname include:

- Daniel Karlsbakk (born 2003), Norwegian footballer
- Eivind Karlsbakk (born 1975), Norwegian footballer
- Markus Karlsbakk (born 2000), Norwegian footballer
