= Skjælaaen =

Skjælaaen is a Norwegian surname. Notable people with the surname include:

- Bjørg Skjælaaen (1933–2019), Norwegian pair skater
- Eirik Skjælaaen (born 1974), Norwegian footballer
- Rune J. Skjælaaen (born 1954), Norwegian politician
