= Tom Henning Øvrebø =

Norwegian football referee

- Full name: Tom Henning Øvrebø
- Born: 26 June 1966 (age 60); Oslo, Norway
- Other occupation: Psychologist

Domestic
Years	League	Role
1992–2012	(Norway) Tippeligaen	Referee
2013	(Norway) 1. divisjon	Referee

International
Years	League	Role
1994–2010	FIFA	Referee

Tom Henning Øvrebø (born 26 June 1966) is a Norwegian former football referee who has officiated matches in the UEFA Cup and the UEFA Champions League. He has been elected in UEFA's top category of Elite Referee. Øvrebø has worked outside football as a qualified psychologist.

He is known for refereeing in multiple controversial matches including the 2008–09 UEFA Champions League semifinal between Chelsea and Barcelona.

== Career ==
Born in Oslo, Øvrebø refereed over two hundred games in the Norwegian top division since his debut made on 20 September 1992. He represented the Norwegian sports club Nordstrand. In 1994, he became an authorised FIFA referee. He won the Kniksen Award as referee of the year in the Norwegian top League for 2001, 2002, 2003, 2005, and 2006. He refereed the Norwegian Cup finals of 1999 (Rosenborg–Brann 2-0) and 2006 (Fredrikstad–Sandefjord 3–0).

=== Controversies ===
==== Euro 2008: Italy ====
Øvrebø was chosen to referee at the Euro 2008, his first major tournament and the first time he was chosen over fellow countryman and colleague Terje Hauge. He refereed the Germany–Poland match on the opening day of Group B and the Italy–Romania match of Group C that ended in a 1–1 draw. In that game, Italy scored first with a Luca Toni goal but Øvrebø disallowed it for offside. He subsequently admitted that the decision "was a mistake," after watching the pass to Toni in a television replay. Despite the draw, Italy advanced to the next stage of the tournament.

==== 2008–09 Champions League: Chelsea-Barcelona ====
On 6 May 2009, Øvrebø officiated in the UEFA Champions League's semi-final second leg between Chelsea and Barcelona. The game ended in a 1–1 draw and Barcelona advanced to the final on away goals. At the end of the game, he was verbally abused by several Chelsea players, including Didier Drogba, José Bosingwa and Michael Ballack, after turning down several penalty appeals by the home team during the match. Drogba had to be physically restrained at the end of the match and the Norwegian referee was later escorted out of England by police on account of fears for his safety. He reportedly received a number of death threats, from which Chelsea distanced themselves. Drogba was subsequently banned for three matches and Bosingwa for two. Chelsea were fined £85,000 for improper conduct on the part of their players and fans.

Øvrebø claimed in 2012 that he was still the subject of abuse from Chelsea fans. In 2018, he admitted to Marca that he made "a series of mistakes" and that he was "not proud" of that performance, which the newspaper presented as "infamous." He claimed that "those mistakes can be committed by [any] referee", and expressed the wish that people will not remember his career "just for that game."

In 2023, French former international referee Tony Chapron reviewed the game, along with Didier Drogba, for the French sports channel Canal+ Sport. Chapron assessed the refereeing in the game as "a disgrace." He considered as its "key moment" the free-kick given by Øvrebø in the first half, instead of a penalty, when Daniel Alves fouled Florent Malouda inside the Barcelona box. Chapron claimed that the referee, having realized he'd made a mistake, "lost his head."

==== 2009–10 Champions League: Fiorentina ====
Øvrebø had previously come under "strong" criticism when, in February 2010, he'd allowed a goal scored by Miroslav Klose from a "clearly" off-side position in the final minutes of the game Bayern Munich vs Fiorentina, in the 2009–10 UEFA Champions League, during the round-of-16. His call sparked anger in Italy, after the managers of both teams agreed it was in error. The result advanced Bayern to the next stage.

Øvrebø, the next day, said "I chose to approve the goal" although admitting "it's clear we should have realised it was offside." He initially blamed the "wrong information" coming from the assistant referee, but ultimately accepted he was responsible.

==== 2010 FIFA World Cup qualification round: Latvia ====
In the group stages of qualification for the 2010 World Cup, Øvrebø refereed the games Armenia–Turkey, Belgium–Spain, and Slovakia–Czech Republic. On 10 October 2009, Øvrebø refereed the Greece–Latvia game. In that game, on 10 October 2009, Øvrebø awarded a "highly disputed" penalty to the Greek team, at that point trailing 2–1, a decision that helped the Greeks turn the result around and win. After the game, Latvian manager Aleksandrs Starkovs stated that "there was clearly no foul" and that he "didn't understand why Øvrebø awarded a penalty."

== Later years and retirement ==
Øvrebø was among the 14 referees short-listed by UEFA for the final stages of the 2010 FIFA World Cup in South Africa, but was eventually not among the 10 referees picked from Europe, as announced in March 2010.

In May 2010, he resigned from his position as a FIFA Referee and concentrated on officiating in the Norwegian league. After three years, in October 2013, Øvrebø announced his retirement from professional refereeing.

== See also ==
- Anders Frisk
