= Hans Brandtun =

Norwegian footballer (born 1963)

Personal information
- Full name: Hans Martin Brandtun
- Date of birth: 16 August 1963 (age 63)
- Place of birth: Bergen, Norway
- Position: Defender

Senior career*
Years	Team	Apps	(Gls)
1982–1988	Brann		
1989	Rosenborg	1	(0)
1990	Fyllingen	22	(1)

International career
1981	Norway U19	3	(0)
1982–1985	Norway U21	14	(0)
1985	Norway	1	(0)
- * Club domestic league appearances and goals

Hans Brandtun (born 16 August 1963) is a Norwegian footballer. He played in one match for the Norway national football team in 1985.
