= Winsnes =

Winsnes is a surname. Notable people with the surname include:

- Andreas Hofgaard Winsnes (1889–1972), Norwegian literary historian and educator
- Arne Winsnes (born 1974), Norwegian footballer
- Fredrik Winsnes (born 1975), Norwegian footballer
- Johan-Petter Winsnes (born 1975), Norwegian footballer
- Hanna Winsnes (1789–1872), Norwegian poet, novelist and cookbook writer
