= 1996 Tippeligaen =

52nd season of top-tier football league in Norway

Tippeligaen
- Season: 1996
- Dates: 13 April – 20 October
- Champions: Rosenborg; 11th title
- Relegated: Moss; Start; Vålerenga
- Champions League: Rosenborg
- UEFA Cup: Lillestrøm; Viking; Brann
- Cup Winners' Cup: Tromsø
- Intertoto Cup: Stabæk
- Matches: 182
- Goals: 638 (3.51 per match)
- Top goalscorer: Harald Martin Brattbakk (28 goals)
- Biggest home win: Rosenborg 10–0 Brann (5 May 1996)
- Biggest away win: Skeid 1–6 Brann (1 September 1996)
- Highest scoring: Rosenborg 10–0 Brann (5 May 1996)
- Highest attendance: 23,071; Rosenborg 0–0 Moss (16 May 1996)
- Lowest attendance: 909; Skeid 2–3 Start (13 October 1996)
- Average attendance: 5,123 ▲2.2%

The 1996 Tippeligaen was the 52nd completed season of top division football in Norway. Each team played 26 games with 3 points given for wins and 1 for draws. Number twelve, thirteen and fourteen are relegated. The winners of the two groups of the first division (second tier) are promoted, as well as the winner of a play-off match between the two second placed teams in the two groups of the first division. This was the last time the first division was organized into two groups – from 1997 and onwards the first division has had all teams play in the same league.

== Teams and locations ==
Note: Table lists in alphabetical order.

Team	Ap.	Location	Stadium
Bodø/Glimt	8	Bodø	Aspmyra Stadion
Brann	40	Bergen	Brann Stadion
Kongsvinger	14	Kongsvinger	Gjemselund Stadion
Lillestrøm	33	Lillestrøm	Åråsen Stadion
Molde	21	Molde	Molde Stadion
Moss	17	Moss	Melløs Stadion
Rosenborg	33	Trondheim	Lerkendal Stadion
Skeid	32	Oslo	
Stabæk	2	Bærum	Nadderud Stadion
Start	28	Kristiansand	Kristiansand Stadion
Strømsgodset	15	Drammen	Marienlyst Stadion
Tromsø	11	Tromsø	Alfheim Stadion
Vålerenga	38	Oslo	Ullevaal Stadion
Viking	47	Stavanger	Stavanger Stadion

== League table ==
Pos	Team	Pld	W	D	L	GF	GA	GD	Pts	Qualification or relegation
1	Rosenborg (C)	26	18	5	3	82	26	+56	59	Qualification for the Champions League second qualifying round
2	Lillestrøm	26	13	7	6	54	36	+18	46	Qualification for the UEFA Cup second qualifying round
3	Viking	26	12	7	7	50	32	+18	43	Qualification for the UEFA Cup first qualifying round
4	Brann	26	11	9	6	64	50	+14	42	Qualification for the UEFA Cup first qualifying round
5	Tromsø	26	11	8	7	46	41	+5	41	Qualification for the Cup Winners' Cup first round
6	Stabæk	26	9	9	8	47	45	+2	36	Qualification for the Intertoto Cup group stage
7	Kongsvinger	26	9	7	10	38	48	−10	34	Qualification for the Intertoto Cup group stage
8	Molde	26	9	6	11	45	38	+7	33	
9	Skeid	26	10	2	14	33	59	−26	32	
10	Bodø/Glimt	26	9	4	13	44	49	−5	31	
11	Strømsgodset	26	8	5	13	40	59	−19	29	
12	Moss (R)	26	7	8	11	28	47	−19	29	Relegation to First Division
13	Vålerenga (R)	26	6	10	10	30	40	−10	28	Relegation to First Division
14	Start (R)	26	5	3	18	37	71	−34	18	Relegation to First Division

Source: fotball.no
Rules for classification: 1) points; 2) goal difference; 3) number of goals scored.
(C) Champions; (R) Relegated

== Relegation play-offs ==
- Sogndal won the play-offs against Odd Grenland, 5–1 on aggregate.
12 October 1996
15:00 CEST (UTC+2)

Sogndal	4–1	Odd Grenland
Karlsbakk 22'; Bakke 44'; Hillestad 80' (pen.); Flo 83'	Report	Kolstad 13'

Fosshaugane, Sogndalsfjøra
Attendance: 962
Referee: Jon Skjervold

19 October 1996
15:00 CEST (UTC+2)

Odd Grenland	0–1	Sogndal
	Report	Bakke 71'

Odd Stadion, Skien
Attendance: 2,468
Referee: Tore Hollung

== Results ==
Home \ Away	BOD	BRA	KON	LIL	MOL	MOS	ROS	SKD	STB	IKS	STM	TRO	VÅL	VIK
Bodø/Glimt	—	1–3	5–3	1–3	1–3	4–1	0–4	0–3	0–1	3–3	1–1	1–3	3–0	7–0
Brann	2–0	—	2–0	2–2	4–0	1–1	3–3	1–2	4–0	7–1	6–2	3–3	2–2	1–1
Kongsvinger	2–1	2–2	—	1–5	1–0	2–1	4–3	1–2	4–2	0–2	3–0	2–2	1–0	3–1
Lillestrøm	1–2	3–3	0–0	—	3–0	2–0	3–0	5–0	2–1	3–0	3–3	1–1	2–0	0–4
Molde	1–2	3–3	0–0	2–0	—	8–0	0–3	0–1	0–0	5–1	0–1	3–0	2–0	3–0
Moss	0–1	2–1	2–2	1–0	1–1	—	0–0	1–0	2–4	1–0	5–2	0–1	2–2	1–0
Rosenborg	2–0	10–0	3–0	7–2	2–0	0–0	—	6–1	4–2	2–1	5–0	2–1	6–0	2–1
Skeid	1–3	1–6	0–0	1–3	1–5	2–1	0–2	—	3–1	2–3	2–3	1–0	2–1	1–2
Stabæk	1–0	4–1	5–0	0–3	3–3	2–2	4–4	1–1	—	1–1	4–0	0–2	0–0	1–1
Start	2–2	0–2	4–5	0–2	4–2	5–0	2–1	1–2	1–2	—	2–6	1–4	2–4	0–3
Strømsgodset	2–4	0–2	1–1	1–3	1–3	0–1	0–1	1–0	2–2	4–1	—	2–2	5–2	1–3
Tromsø	2–1	4–1	2–1	1–0	3–1	2–2	1–5	2–4	1–0	3–0	0–1	—	0–0	2–2
Vålerenga	1–1	0–2	0–0	2–1	0–0	4–1	0–4	3–0	2–3	1–0	3–0	2–2	—	0–0
Viking	4–0	3–0	1–0	2–2	3–0	1–0	1–1	7–0	2–3	4–0	0–1	2–2	2–1	—

Source: NIFS (in Norwegian)
Legend: Blue = home team win; Yellow = draw; Red = away team win.

== Season statistics ==
=== Top scorers ===
Rank	Player	Club	Goals
1	(Norway) Harald Martin Brattbakk	Rosenborg	28
2	(Norway) Egil Østenstad	Viking	23
3	(Norway) Tore André Flo	Brann	19
3	(Norway) Mons Ivar Mjelde	Brann	19
5	(Norway) Petter Belsvik	Stabæk	18
6	(Norway) Geir Frigård	Lillestrøm	15
6	(Norway) Jahn Ivar "Mini" Jakobsen	Rosenborg	15
6	(Norway) Sigurd Rushfeldt	Tromsø	15

=== Attendances ===
Pos	Team	Total	High	Low	Average	Change
1	Brann	149,837	23,000	7,667	11,526	+35.0%
2	Rosenborg	143,875	23,071	6,307	11,067	+7.7%
3	Viking	96,727	14,919	4,874	7,441	−6.5%
4	Vålerenga	80,651	16,738	2,542	6,204	−4.0%
5	Lillestrøm	74,852	12,281	2,853	5,758	+18.8%
6	Molde	55,198	8,365	2,352	4,246	−14.9%
7	Bodø/Glimt	51,669	6,162	2,378	3,975	−9.7%
8	Strømsgodset	48,131	6,452	1,495	3,702	n/a^{1}
9	Tromsø	45,814	6,294	1,802	3,524	−16.3%
10	Stabæk	40,304	4,976	1,392	3,100	−6.1%
11	Moss	40,280	5,052	1,101	3,098	n/a^{1}
12	Skeid	39,720	6,852	909	3,055	n/a^{1}
13	Start	32,936	4,530	1,222	2,534	−48.1%
14	Kongsvinger	32,347	4,788	1,876	2,488	−5.1%
	League total	932,341	23,071	909	5,123	+2.2%

Source: nifs.no
Notes:
1: Team played last season in 1. divisjon.
