= Espen Solheim =

Norwegian footballer (born 1976)

Personal information
- Date of birth: 18 March 1976 (age 50)
- Place of birth: Bodø
- Height: 1.78 m (5 ft 10 in)
- Position: Midfielder

Youth career
- Tverlandet
- Flatås
- Rosenborg

Senior career*
| Years | Team | Apps | (Gls) |
| 1994–1995 | Rosenborg | 5 | (0) |
| 1996 | Tromsø | 5 | (0) |
- Fløy

International career
| 1991 | Norway u-16 | 11 | (0) |
| 1992 | Norway u-17 | 2 | (0) |
| 1993 | Norway u-18 | 9 | (0) |
| 1994 | Norway u-19 | 3 | (0) |
| 1995 | Norway u-21 | 1 | (0) |
- * Club domestic league appearances and goals

Espen Solheim (born 18 March 1976) is a retired Norwegian football midfielder.

He was born in Bodø and moved with his family to Trondheim at age 10. At the age of 15 he went from minnows Flatås IL to the youth setup of Rosenborg BK, eventually advancing through the junior ranks to make his league debut in 1994. He got 5 league games, 4 cup games including the victorious 1995 Norwegian Football Cup Final, and even one European game. In the 1996 season he got 5 league games for Tromsø IL, but his contract was mutually terminated because of knee injuries. He moved to Kristiansand, later appearing for Flekkerøy IL.

He represented Norway from u-16 through u-21 level.
