= Leif Nordli =

Norwegian footballer (born 1966)

Personal information
- Full name: Leif Jostein Nordli
- Date of birth: 23 October 1966 (age 60)
- Position: Defender

Youth career
- Nærøy

Senior career*
Years	Team	Apps	(Gls)
1982–1985	Nærøy		
1986	Rørvik		
1987–1989	Namsos		
1990	Rosenborg	10	(0)
1991–1998	Hamkam		

Managerial career
- 2000–2002: Hamkam (youth)
- 2003–2005: Hamar
- 2013–2016: Ottestad
- 2017–2019: Hamkam (youth)
- 2019–2021: Fart (women)
- 2024–: Elverum (assistant)
- * Club domestic league appearances and goals

Leif Nordli (born 23 October 1966) is a retired Norwegian football defender. He became league champion with Rosenborg BK in 1990, but spent most of his career in Hamkam. After retiring he worked as a schoolteacher and manager in Hedmark.

== Career ==
Nordli hails from Bjørndal in Nærøy Municipality and started his football career in Nærøy from 1982 to 1985. In 1986 he played one season for Rørvik IL before being picked up by the team from the nearest city, Namsos IL. After losing his starting place in late 1987, Nordli conducted extra training sessions with the athletics club Namsen FIF to become faster.

In 1989, Namsos led the table on the second tier, with Nordli as team captain. He attracted the interest from regional giants Rosenborg BK. He was invited to train with the club and was subsequently signed as a central defender. He was signed at the same time as Rosenborg scouted Erik Hoftun from KIL/Hemne.

His first competition would be a friendly tournament hosted by Werder Bremen (who had bought the Rosenborg player Rune Bratseth) with participation from Spartak Moscow and Zambia. Nordli won the league with Rosenborg, but in the 1990 Norwegian Football Cup which Rosenborg also won, Nordli sat out the final on the bench, and was therefore not eligible for the cup trophy.

He was put on the transfer list in late 1990. Wanted by Namsos, Strindheim and Molde, Nordli eventually signed for Hamkam, where he stayed for eight seasons. The highlights included promotion from the 1991 1. divisjon and a fifth place in the 1993 Eliteserien. In 1997 Nordli was invited to train with the Chris Hughton-led Tottenham Hotspur U21, as a courtesy after Tottenham signed Steffen Iversen.

The 1994 season became tougher for Hamkam, and in July, Nordli broke his leg. During the pre-season training camp in Cyprus in March 1995, Nordli broke his collarbone. The 1995 Eliteserien ended in relegation, and Hamkam failed to win re-promotion. At the same time as Hamkam were relegated from the 1998 1. divisjon, Nordli had to retire from playing.

== Managerial career ==
An attempted comeback for HamKam 2 in the fall of 1999 stranded after one game. Nordli retired definitely, and was hired as a youth coach for Hamkam. From 2003 to 2005 he managed Hamar IL. After coaching his own children in Ottestad IL, Nordli took over the men's team ahead of the 2013 season. Ottestad usually placed in the upper half of their Third Division group.

In 2017, he commenced the UEFA A Licence and was a youth coach in Hamkam. In June 2019 he took over the women's team of FL Fart. The team had several promising players such as Julie Blakstad and Mathilde Harviken, but had not won a single game in 2019 Toppserien. Following his second relegation with Fart in three seasons, the last time from the 2021 First Division, Nordli was sacked by Fart. He was hired as assistant manager of Elverum ahead of the 2024 season.

== Personal life ==
While Nordli resided in Hamar, he enrolled at Hedmark University College. Jettisoning his previous plan to take over the family farm, he now became a teacher. Nordli among others worked at Ottestad Lower Secondary School and Wang.

He married Wenche Bolkan. They settled in the outskirts of Hamar. Both their sons became footballers. The youngest, Simen Bolkan Nordli, became a Norwegian youth international, played in Eliteserien as well as abroad. The oldest, Jonas Bolkan Nordli became a physiotherapist. Hired as a physio by second-tier club Ranheim Fotball, Jonas also participated as a player in Ranheim's training sessions, and was eventually signed as a player in the summer of 2023.
