= Eirik Skjælaaen =

Norwegian footballer (born 1974)

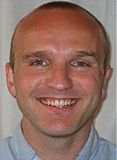
- Eirik Skjælaaen.

Personal information
- Date of birth: 14 October 1974 (age 52)
- Place of birth: Bergen, Norway
- Position: Midfielder

Youth career
- Bergen Nord

Senior career*
Years	Team	Apps	(Gls)
–1991	Bergen Nord		
1992–1999	Brann	40	(7)
1998	→ Haugesund (loan)	3	(0)
1999–2003	Fyllingen		

International career
1990	Norway U15	1	(1)
1991	Norway U16	2	(0)
1992	Norway U17	6	(0)
1993	Norway U18	3	(0)
- * Club domestic league appearances and goals

Eirik Skjælaaen (born 14 October 1974) is a retired Norwegian football midfielder.

A youth player in Bergen Nord FK, he was among others offered a scholarship from a university in Colorado. He represented Norway as a youth international. In 1992 he joined the largest club in Bergen, SK Brann. He appeared for the first team from 1995 on, and following a 1995 season with ample playing opportunities he featured more scarcely in 1996 and 1997 and not at all in 1998.

In late July 1998 a quintet was axed from the Brann squad, being demoted to the junior team lest they found another club: Geir Hasund, Eirik Skjælaaen, Gunnar Norebø, Morten Pettersen and André Herfindal. A week later Skjælaaen signed for FK Haugesund on loan. After a lengthy contract dispute also involving the players' trade union, Skjælaaen was finally released in April 1999 and commenced a long stint in Fyllingen.
