= Inge Ludvigsen =

Norwegian footballer and manager (born 1965)

Inge Ludvigsen (born 10 March 1965) is a Norwegian footballer who played most of his career in Fyllingen Fotball. He also played for IK Start and SK Brann.

After he retired as a footballer he was manager at Fyllingen Fotball but resigned in 2005. Inge Ludvigsen is brother of footballer Per-Ove Ludvigsen.
