= Chinedu Cyprain Ononogbo =

Icelandic footballer (born 2002)

Personal information
- Full name: Chinedu Cyprain Ononogbo
- Date of birth: 9 August 2007 (age 19)
- Place of birth: Nigeria
- Position: Forward

Team information
- Current team: Brann
- Number: 30

Senior career*
| Years | Team | Apps | (Gls) |
| –2026 | Right2Win | ? | (?) |
| 2026– | Brann | 0 | (0) |
- * Club domestic league appearances and goals as of 5 October 2026

Chinedu Cyprain Ononogbo (born 29 August 2007) is an Nigerian professional footballer who plays as a forward for Eliteserien club Brann.

== Club career ==
Ononogbo developed his youth career in Nigeria at the Right2Win Academy.

In February 2026, he secured a permanent move to Europe, signing contract stretching out the 2029 season with Norwegian side Brann. Upon arrival, he was initially integrated into the club's setup via the reserve team, Brann 2.
