= Roger Helland =

Norwegian footballer (born 1973)

Personal information
- Date of birth: 26 September 1973 (age 53)
- Place of birth: Austrheim Municipality, Norway
- Height: 1.82 m (6 ft 0 in)
- Position: Midfielder

Youth career
- Brann

Senior career*
Years	Team	Apps	(Gls)
1993–1999	Brann	154	(15)
1999–2000	Brøndby	12	(0)
2000–2002	Lillestrøm	26	(0)
2003–2005	Fredrikstad	59	(8)

International career
1989	Norway G–15	2	(0)
1994–1995	Norway U–21	22	(5)
1997	Norway	2	(0)
- * Club domestic league appearances and goals

Roger Helland (born 26 September 1973) is a Norwegian former professional footballer who spent the bulk of his career with SK Brann. A midfielder, played two games for the Norway national football team in 1997.

== Career ==
Helland hails from Austrheim Municipality and was a part of the various youth teams in SK Brann. He first represented Norway in two under-15 matches in 1989. He made his first appearance on the senior team in the Norwegian Premier League in 1993 when he came on as a sub in the 88th minute in a game against Rosenborg BK at Lerkendal, as Brann won 4–0. He only played one more game in the spring season but from the twelfth game of the season he played all the remaining games, for a total of 13 league games in his first season. He also played 22 matches for the under-21 team between 1994 and 1995. In 1997, Helland helped Brann finish second in the Norwegian Premier League, Brann's best league position since 1975, and he made his debut and played his only two games for the Norway national team that year. Helland played in Brann until 1999 and played a total of 206 games, scoring 21 goals for the club. In the Norwegian Premier League he played 154 games scoring 15 goals.

As Helland's contract with Brann ran out in December 1999, he was offered a contract by a number of Norwegian clubs. Helland eventually chose to move abroad, as he signed a half-season contract with Danish club Brøndby IF, where fellow Norwegian Åge Hareide had just become head coach. Helland was a part of Hareide's Scandinavian venture in that transfer window, and arrived at Brøndby alongside Stig Inge Bjørnebye, Magnus Svensson, Krister Nordin, and Mattias Jonson. He was brought in by Hareide to replace Brøndby's "risky" central defender Vragel da Silva in the zone defense of Hareide's newly introduced 4-3-3 formation. Having made his official Brøndby debut in March 2000, Helland went on to play 12 of Brøndby’s remaining 15 league games of the 1999–2000 Danish Superliga season, as Brøndby finished in second place. Towards the end of the season, Brøndby chairman Per Bjerregaard criticized the cooperation of the central defense pairing of Helland and Per Nielsen, and Helland subsequently received general criticism from the Danish media. Helland's contract was not renewed in the summer 2000.

He returned to Norway and Lillestrøm SK in June 2000. During his spell with Lillestrøm he played 26 league-matches for the club. When Fredrikstad was promoted to the Norwegian First Division in 2002, Helland was signed in December 2002 to strengthen the team. Fredrikstad were promoted again and Helland was back in the Norwegian Premier League with his third team. In the third game of the 2004 season he scored Fredrikstad's first goal in 20 years in the top flight of Norwegian football, when Molde FK was defeated 1–0 at Aker Stadion.

On 13 June 2004, he was back at Brann stadion to play against his old team Brann. The game ended unfortunate for Helland when he was sent off after a questionable decision by the referee. After playing 59 league-matches and scoring 8 goals for Fredrikstad, Helland retired as a footballer in 2005. In 2009, he came back to Brann as a coach for the junior team.
