= Kjell Tennfjord =

Norwegian football manager

Personal information
- Date of birth: 17 December 1953 (age 72)
- Place of birth: Norway

Managerial career
- Years: Team
- 1990: Fyllingen Fotball
- 1991–1992: Bryne FK
- 1995–1998: SK Brann

Kjell Tennfjord (born 17 December 1953) is a Norwegian siviløkonom and entrepreneur, but is best known as a football manager.

He managed Fyllingen Fotball to a cup final (1990), Bryne FK (1991–92), and SK Brann (1995-1998).

At Brann, Tennfjord managed the club to play in the Norwegian Premier League 1995, 4th Place in the Norwegian Premier League 1996 and 2nd place in the Norwegian Premier League 1997. They lost the cup finale (1995), which took them to the European UEFA Cup Winners' Cup where they beat PSV and lost in the quarter-final against Liverpool F.C. (1997). He went 11 games without a single victory in the Norwegian Premier League 1998.

Tennfjord is retired associate professor at Volda Pedagogiske Høgskole, and graduated in siviløkonom from the Norwegian School of Economics, and worked as deputy manager of Elcon Finans and organisational manager of NB Steel (Norsk Blikkvalseverk).

After a time in administration of Brann (1998–99) he moved to Fjellbekk, where he became a headhunter for Erik Solér's agent firm, Sports Management Group (2000), working with Frode Ohr and Møreforskning in outreach projects.
