= Varden Amfi =

Football stadium in Bergen, Norway

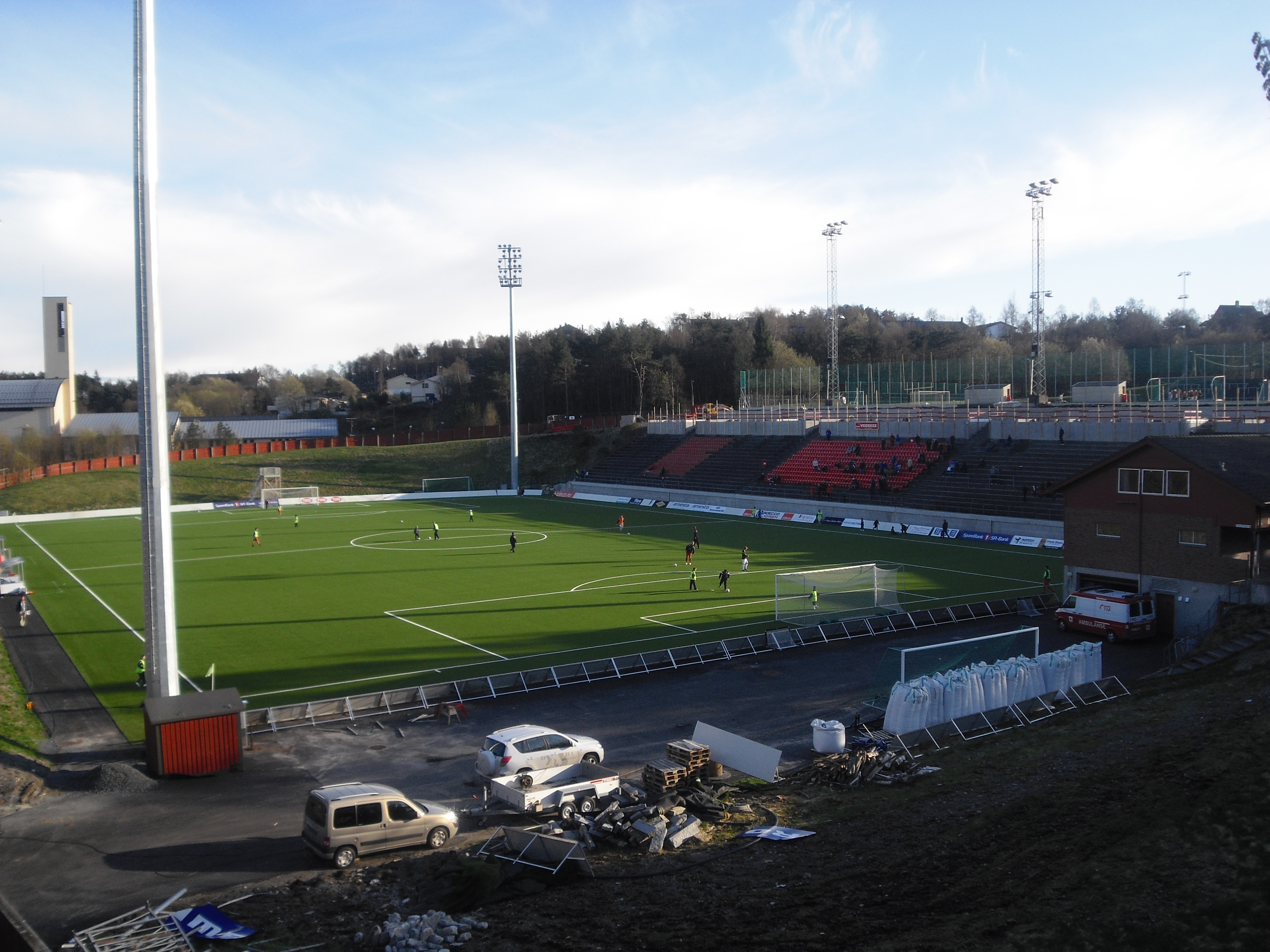
- Interactive map of Varden Amfi
- Coordinates: 60°20′30″N 5°16′6″E
- Capacity: 3,500

Construction
- Opened: 1992

Tenants
- FK Fyllingsdalen (2012–); Løv-Ham (2008–2011); Fyllingen (1992–2011)

Varden Amfi is a football venue in Bergen, Norway. The stadium is currently used by FK Fyllingsdalen who plays in the Norwegian Second Division. It was formerly used by now dissolved clubs Løv-Ham and Fyllingen Fotball.

It was originally opened in 1992, but upgraded to the Norwegian First Division standard in 2008. Before the upgrade Løv-Ham played at Krohnsminde which did not meet the Football Association's requirements. The upgrade, which was estimated to NOK 20–25 million, was fully financed by the local businessman Trond Mohn.

The venue has an artificial turf.
