= Jan Ove Pedersen =

Norwegian footballer and coach (born 1968)

Personal information
- Full name: Jan Ove Pedersen
- Date of birth: 12 November 1968 (age 57)
- Place of birth: Oslo, Norway
- Position: Central midfielder

Youth career
- 1988: Kløfta

Senior career*
| Years | Team | Apps | (Gls) |
| 1988–1995 | Lillestrøm | 166 | (15) |
| 1996–1999 | Brann | 85 | (9) |
| 1996–1997 | → Cercle Brugge (loan) | 8 | (1) |
| 1997–1998 | → Hartlepool United (loan) | 17 | (1) |
| 1999–2005 | SW Bregenz | 171 | (81) |

International career
| 1984 | Norway U15 | 3 | (1) |
| 1985 | Norway U16 | 4 | (1) |
| 1986 | Norway U17 | 6 | (1) |
| 1985 | Norway U19 | 5 | (1) |
| 1988–1989 | Norway U21 | 3 | (0) |
| 1989 | Norway B | 1 | (0) |
| 1988–1994 | Norway | 17 | (1) |

Managerial career
- 2005–2007: SC Bregenz
- 2009–2010: SV Frastanz
- 2013–2014: FC Hörbranz
- 2014–2015: SV Lochau
- 2016: SC Röthis
- 2017: SV Lochau (assistant)
- 2018–2019: SV Lochau
- 2019–: Lyngdal
- * Club domestic league appearances and goals

Jan Ove Pedersen (born 12 November 1968) is a Norwegian football coach and former player. He was manager of SC Bregenz in the Austrian Regional League, the third-highest division in Austrian football, until his sacking on 28 October 2007.

During his playing career, he turned out for Lillestrøm and Brann of Norway, Cercle Brugge and SW Bregenz of Austria, as well as a loanspell at the English club Hartlepool United.

== Playing career ==
As a player, Pedersen was a holding midfielder. His performances between 1990 and 1994 at Lillestrøm brought him international recognition. From there he signed for Brann in 1996, in a deal which saw Frank Strandli go the other way. Pedersen was a hugely popular player, especially at Hartlepool United. Despite only making 20 appearances (scoring three goals) whilst on loan from Brann, he would be one of the first names on any supporter's All Time XI for the club. He finished his career playing in Schwarz-Weiss Bregenz, reaching the Intertoto Cup in 2002 and 2004.

== Managerial career ==
When SW Bregenz went bankrupt in 2004 and lost their professional license, they turned to Pedersen to coach a hastily assembled squad of amateur players. His first two seasons in charge of the now renamed SC Bregenz saw two promotions, the second of these as Vorarlbergliga champions. On 28 October 2007, just before the winter break, he was fired with SC Bregenz in the relegation zone of the Regional League West. From 2009 until 30 June 2010 he was the player/trainer for SV Brauerei Frastanz in the 2. Landesklasse.

== Life after football ==
Pedersen has settled in the Bregenz area and is now working as a management consultant.
