= Karl Petter Løken =

Norwegian footballer and businessman (born 1966)

Personal information
- Full name: Karl Petter Løken
- Date of birth: 14 August 1966 (age 60)
- Place of birth: Karlskoga, Sweden
- Height: 1.84 m (6 ft 0 in)
- Positions: Defender; striker

Youth career
- Sarpsborg FK
- Askim IF

Senior career*
Years	Team	Apps	(Gls)
1985–1996	Rosenborg	216	(64)
1997–1998	Stabæk	27	(0)
Total		280	(64)

International career
1986–1987	Norway U-21	3	(0)
1987–1995	Norway	36	(1)
- * Club domestic league appearances and goals

Karl Petter "Kalle" Løken (born Karl Petter Löken; 14 August 1966) is a Norwegian businessman and former footballer. He became the CEO of Kværner ASA in May 2018.

Løken played 243 matches in the Norwegian top division, most of them for Rosenborg, Trondheim, earning seven league titles and four cup championships. Løken was capped 36 times for Norway national team. Løken is a master of engineering and was previously also working part-time as sports commentator for Norwegian Broadcasting Corporation.

== Biography ==
Løken was born in Karlskoga, Sweden. As a youth he played for Sarpsborg FK and Askim IF. When he came to Trondheim in 1985 to study at Norwegian Institute of Technology he phoned Rosenborg and asked if he could come and play for the club, and the answer was yes. Løken was a natural allrounder, but played primarily on the right side as defender or striker. Løken spent twelve seasons at Rosenborg, where he won the league seven times and the cup four times. He was the top scorer in Tippeligaen in 1991 and was capped 36 times for the capped Norway national team. He scored one goal for Norway, in a friendly against Austria 31. May 1989. He was in the 1994 World Cup squad, as an unused substitute.

In 1997 Løken was transferred to Stabæk, where he played two seasons before retiring, briefly coaching a Stabæk youth team thereafter. While at Rosenborg, Løken attended the Norwegian Institute of Technology, where he got a Master's degree in chemical engineering. For many years after his active career he was a part-time sports commentator for NRK.

He has held various engineering and management positions with the companies Statoil, Aker Solutions, Norsk Hydro and Lundin Petroleum. Since May 2018 he has been CEO of the engineering company Kværner ASA.

He is a brother of editor Kjersti Løken Stavrum.

== Honours ==
Rosenborg

- Norwegian top division: 1988, 1990, 1992, 1993, 1994, 1995, 1996
- Norwegian Cup: 1988, 1990, 1992, 1995

Individual

- Norwegian top division top scorer: 1991
