= Knut Aga Jr. =

Norwegian footballer and manager (born 1971)

Knut Aga
Personal information
- Date of birth: 4 January 1971 (age 55)
- Height: 1.85 m (6 ft 1 in)
- Positions: Forward; defender

Youth career
- Rælingen
- –1988: Strømmen

Senior career*
Years	Team	Apps	(Gls)
1989–1991	Strømmen		
1992	Bryne		
1993–1996	Vålerenga		
1997–1998	Lyn	23	(1)
1999–2000	Sørumsand		

Managerial career
- 2005–2006: Skedsmo
- 2007–2009: Lørenskog
- 2010: Skedsmo
- 2011: Fet
- 2016–2017: Skedsmo
- * Club domestic league appearances and goals

Knut Aga (born 4 January 1971) is a Norwegian former football striker and defender.

== Career ==
He played youth football for Rælingen and Strømmen, and was drafted into Strømmen's senior team in 1989. Ahead of the 1992 season he transferred to Bryne, but already in 1993 he went on to Vålerenga. He became the club's top goalscorer in 1994 with 8 goals, but was repositioned as a full back.

In 1997 he joined Lyn, but never became a regular. He rounded off his career in lowly Sørumsand IF and later turned to coaching.

After a successful run as head coach of Skedsmo FK, securing two promotions, Aga went on to coach Lørenskog IF in 2007 when he resigned in the autumn of 2009. He returned to Skedsmo ahead of the 2010 season, but resigned in the summer of 2010 for personal reasons. Ahead of the 2011 season he signed on to Fet IL, but resigned already in May 2011, again citing personal reasons. Aga rejoined Skedsmo ahead of the 2016 season.
