= Arne Winsnes =

Norwegian footballer (born 1974)

Personal information
- Date of birth: 27 July 1974 (age 52)
- Position: Midfielder

Youth career
- Rosenborg

Senior career*
Years	Team	Apps	(Gls)
1995	Rosenborg	1	(0)
1996	Strindheim		
1997–1999	Byåsen		
1999–2000	Rosenborg	2	(0)
2000–2001	→ Byåsen (loan)		
2002–2003	Byåsen		
- Fagerborg
- * Club domestic league appearances and goals

Arne Winsnes (born 27 July 1974) is a retired Norwegian football midfielder.

He came through the junior ranks of Rosenborg BK. In 1995 he made his league debut, only featuring in the 9–1 thrashing of Ham Kam, but also featured in the victorious 1995 Norwegian Football Cup Final. He went on to second-tier Strindheim and Byåsen, and eventually performed so well that he secured a 1999 transfer back to Rosenborg. In the summer of 2000 he went to a season-and-a-half loan to Byåsen, joining them permanently thereafter. He later moved from Trondheim and featured for lowly Fagerborg.
