= Erik Johannessen (footballer, born 1984) =

Swedish footballer

Personal information
- Full name: Björn Erik Johannessen
- Date of birth: 8 August 1984 (age 42)
- Place of birth: Sweden
- Height: 1.75 m (5 ft 9 in)
- Positions: Forward; winger

Youth career
- –2000: IFK Valla
- 2001–2002: Örgryte IS

Senior career*
Years	Team	Apps	(Gls)
2003–2007	Örgryte IS	31	(2)
2006	→ Ljungskile SK (loan)	5	(0)
2007	→ Västra Frölunda IF (loan)	22	(2)
2008–2012	Västra Frölunda IF	99	(22)
2013–2014	Skärhamns IK	35	(38)
2014	→ Skärhamns IK Lag 2	1	(1)
2015–2017	Stenungsunds IF	55	(14)
2017	→ Stenungsunds IF Lag 2	1	(0)
2018	IFK Björkö	2	(0)
Total		250	(79)
- * Club domestic league appearances and goals

Erik Johannessen (born 8 August 1984) is a Swedish retired footballer who played as a forward. During his career, he played for clubs such as Örgryte IS, Västra Frölunda IF and Stenungsunds IF.
