= Mons Ivar Mjelde =

Norwegian footballer and manager (born 1967)

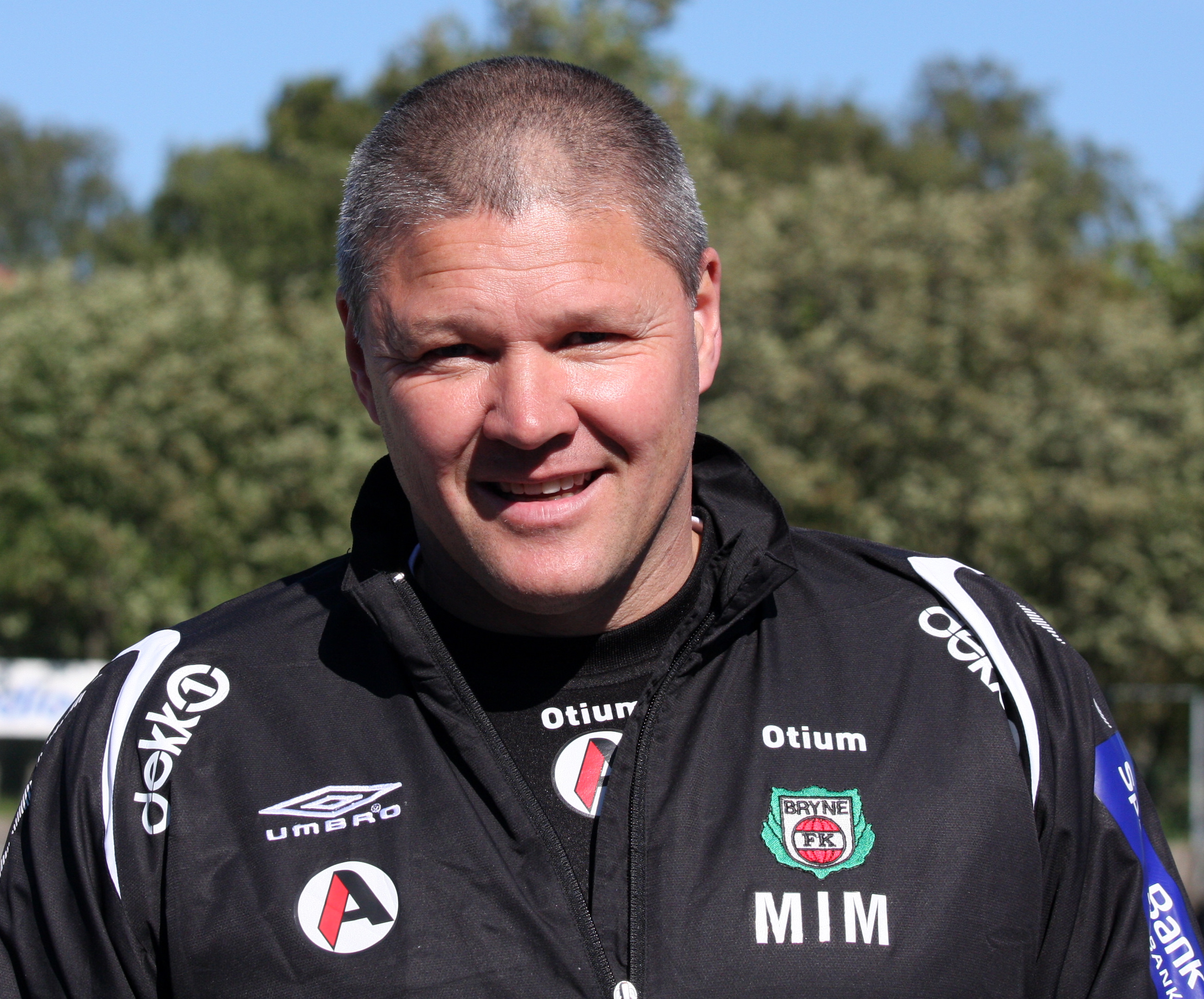
- Mjelde in 2009

Personal information
- Date of birth: 17 November 1967 (age 58)
- Place of birth: Osterøy Municipality, Norway
- Position: Striker

Team information
- Current team: Åsane (Head coach)

Senior career*
Years	Team	Apps	(Gls)
1989–1990	Brann	31	(7)
1991–1992	Bryne	37	(12)
1992–1994	Lillestrøm	53	(29)
1994–1995	Austria Wien	62	(28)
1996–2001	Brann	97	(48)
2001	→ Sogndal (loan)	7	(2)
Total		287	(126)

International career
1993	Norway	3	(2)

Managerial career
- 2002: Brann (reserve team)
- 2003–2008: Brann
- 2009: Bryne
- 2011–2015: Start
- 2016: Fredrikstad
- 2016–2018: Åsane
- 2020: Øygarden
- * Club domestic league appearances and goals

Mons Ivar Mjelde (born 17 November 1967) is a Norwegian football coach and former player who works as head coach for the Norwegian club Øygarden.

He is notable for having led Brann to the Norwegian top division championship in 2007, breaking the widely supported team's notorious spell of 44 years without a league title. As a player, he was a prolific goalscorer both in the Norwegian top division and the Austrian Bundesliga. He also won three caps for Norway, scoring two goals.

Mjelde has won the Kniksen award both as a player and as a head coach.

== Playing career ==
Mjelde was born in Osterøy Municipality. During his active career, He spent two seasons at Austria Wien, two and a half seasons at Lillestrøm and a total of seven seasons at Brann. He also played one season in Bryne – before he went to Lillestrøm. Towards the end of his career, he was loaned out to Sogndal in 2001. Mjelde scored 72 goals in 160 matches for Brann, earning himself and the team silver medals in 1997 and 2000, bronze medals and a cup silver as losing finalists in 1999 and an advancement to the quarter final in the Cup Winners' Cup in 1997, in which they were eliminated by Liverpool. After returning to Brann from Austria in 1996, Mjelde scored 19 goals in 15 league appearances, earning him the Kniksen award as "striker of the year". Mons Ivar played three games and scored two goals for Norway.

== Coaching career ==
His first four years as a head coach saw Mjelde win both the league and the cup in Norway. Retiring as a player after the 2001 season, Mjelde became the new coach for Brann's reserve team in the Norwegian Second Division. The year after, Brann's head coach, Teitur Thordarson left the club. In January 2003, after only one year's experience as a coach, Mons Ivar Mjelde was appointed head coach in SK Brann. The season resulted in Brann finishing 6th, a major improvement from the previous year. The following year he guided Brann to a bronze medal in the premiership. They also won the cup, the first trophy in 22 years.

In the 2005 season, Brann finished 6th. 2006 was a better season for Mjelde and Brann, who finished as runners-up to Rosenborg. In 2007, his coaching career hit new heights as he took Brann to their first league title in 44 years, six points ahead of Stabæk. On 7 October 2008, Mons Ivar Mjelde announced that the 2008 season would conclude his spell in Brann.

Mjelde was officially appointed as head coach for Bryne on 1 June 2009. In 2011, he coached Valestrand Hjellvik for two games before being snapped up by Start. He was hired as head coach of Start halfway through the 2011 season, but could not save the team from relegation. The next season, Start won the Adeccoligaen and consequently promotion to the top flight in the 2012 season.

In December 2016, Mjelde was appointed as head coach for Åsane IL, a Norwegian First Division team from Bergen. The parts separate ways, after the club was relegated in 2018.

In September 2020, Mjelde was appointed as head coach for Øygarden FK.

== Career statistics ==
Appearances and goals by club, season and competition
Season	Club	League			National cup		League cup		Europe		Total	
Season	Club	Division	Apps	Goals	Apps	Goals	Apps	Goals	Apps	Goals	Apps	Goals
Brann	1989	First Division	10	0	2	0	—		—		12	0
Brann	1990	Tippeligaen	21	7	0	0	—		—		21	7
Brann	Total		31	7	2	0	0	0	0	0	33	7
Bryne	1991	First Division			0	0	—		—			
Lillestrøm	1992	Tippeligaen	22	7	5	6	—		—		27	13
Lillestrøm	1993	Tippeligaen	21	19	4	7	—		—		25	26
Lillestrøm	1994	Tippeligaen	10	3	2	4	—		—		12	7
Lillestrøm	Total		53	29	11	17	0	0	0	0	64	46
Austria Wien	1994–95	Austrian Bundesliga	33	17	0	0	—		4	0	37	17
Austria Wien	1995–96	Austrian Bundesliga	30	11	0	0	—		4	3	34	14
Austria Wien	Total		63	28	0	0	0	0	8	3	71	31
Brann	1996	Tippeligaen	15	19	0	0	—		4	6	19	25
Brann	1997	Tippeligaen	26	16	0	0	—		—		26	16
Brann	1998	Tippeligaen	16	4	0	0	—		—		16	4
Brann	1999	Tippeligaen	18	3	0	0	—		—		18	3
Brann	2000	Tippeligaen	24	6	0	0	—		—		24	6
Brann	2001	Tippeligaen	3	0	0	0	—		—		3	0
Brann	Total		102	48	0	0	0	0	4	6	106	54
Sogndal	2001	Tippeligaen	7	1	1	1	—		—		9	2
Career total			256	113	14	18	0	0	12	9	282	140

== Managerial statistics ==
All competitive league games (league and domestic cup) and international matches (including friendlies) are included.

As of 13 December 2020

Team	Year	Record				
Team	Year	G	W	D	L	Win %
Brann	2003–2008	182	82	38	62	45.05
Bryne	2009	22	9	7	6	40.91
Start	2011–2015	130	57	25	48	43.85
Fredrikstad	2016	11	4	4	3	36.36
Åsane	2016–2018	65	19	19	27	29.23
Øygarden	2020	15	3	4	8	20.00
Career total		425	174	97	154	40.94

== Honours ==
=== Player ===
Individual

- Norwegian top division top scorer: 1993
- Kniksen Award: Striker of the Year in 1996

=== Head coach ===
Brann

- Norwegian Cup: 2004
- Tippeligaen: 2007
- Kniksen Award: Coach of the Year in 2007
