= Geirmund Brendesæter =

Norwegian footballer (born 1970)

Personal information
- Full name: Geirmund Brendesæter
- Date of birth: 22 March 1970 (age 56)
- Place of birth: Stord Municipality, Norway
- Height: 1.76 m (5 ft 9 in)
- Position: Rightback

Senior career*
Years	Team	Apps	(Gls)
- Bremnes IL
- Stord
1991–1996	SK Brann	107	(4)
1997	Arminia Bielefeld	13	(0)
1997–2003	SK Brann	174	(3)

International career
1993–1995	Norway	6	(0)
- * Club domestic league appearances and goals

Geirmund "Geddi" Brendesæter (born 22 March 1970) is a Norwegian former professional footballer who played as a defender.

== Club career ==
Brendesæter played 13 seasons for Brann. His debut was on 1 June 1991, and he played his last match against Vålerenga in the last match of the season 2003. He played mostly as a right defender. During this period he also played 13 matches for the German team Arminia Bielefeld in 1997, but returned to Brann to play the last half of the season. Brendesæter played in total 336 matches for Brann, but scored only seven goals.

In the 2001 season, he went to the media and asked the supporters if he should retire or not. The voting ended with 3525 votes to continue, and 3429 votes to retire. Eventually Brendesæter signed a new contract. In his last match for Brann, he was put on as a substitute a few minutes before the end, the crowd going wild as he entered the pitch. He was placed as a striker, the position which he had played in as a junior player, but had never been used in for Brann.

== Cult status ==
Brendesæther, more commonly known as "Geddi", has been subject to a certain degree of idolizing by the supporters of SK Brann. This is due to his fierce loyalty to the club, alongside his blazing right-flank raids. According to former Brann captain and Aberdeen F.C. left-back Cato Guntveit, the young Brendesæther consistently used to do the tunnel dribble on his opponents while setting the Tippeligaen alight with his firework displays and trademark haircut.

== International career ==
Brendesæther also made six appearances for Norwegian national team between 1993 and 1995.
