= Vidar Bahus =

Norwegian footballer (born 1965)

Vidar Bahus, born 5 June 1965, is a retired Norwegian football goalkeeper who spent his career in SK Brann and Fyllingen Fotball. He played a total of 115 games in the Norwegian Premier League for those clubs from 1990 to 1999.

Outside football Bahus has worked as a bus driver. He is married and has two children.
