= Roy Wassberg =

Norwegian footballer (born 1970)

Personal information
- Date of birth: 28 September 1970 (age 56)
- Place of birth: Bergen, Norway
- Position: Centre back

Senior career*
Years	Team	Apps	(Gls)
1989–1993	SK Brann	85	(3)
1994	Fyllingen	-	(-)
1994–1995	Ethnikos Piraeus	46	(0)
1996–1998	Panionios	22	(0)
1998–2004	Brann	116	(4)
2004–2007	Fyllingen	69	(1)

International career
1990–1991	Norway U21	7	(0)

Managerial career
- 2006–2007: Fyllingen
- 2020–2021: Fyllingsdalen
- * Club domestic league appearances and goals as of 20 January 2008

Roy Wassberg (born 28 September 1970) is a Norwegian footballer, most known for his two runs in SK Brann.

Wassberg first played for Brann between 1989 and 1993, before he transferred to the "other team" from Bergen, Fyllingen. Later that season his dream of playing football in Europe came true when he left his home city to play ball in Greece. Wassberg spent four years in Greece, where he won the 1996-97 Beta Ethniki and the 1997–98 Greek Football Cup with Panionios. Wassberg later returned to Bergen and Brann where he played for the next seven seasons, and captained in 2003.

In the middle of the 2004 season, Wassberg was released from Brann, and he decided to return to his motherclub, Fyllingen. In the 2006 pre-season, Wassberg was appointed the new head coach in Fyllingen, whilst still playing for the club. He managed Fyllingen's successor club FK Fyllingsdalen in 2020 and 2021.

== Personal life ==
Wassberg is the son-in-law of the former football manager and player Roald Jensen, and the father of the current player Niklas Jensen Wassberg.

== Honours ==
Panionios

- Greek Cup: 1997–98
