= Eivind Karlsbakk =

Norwegian footballer (born 1975)

Personal information
- Full name: Eivind Vorren Karlsbakk
- Date of birth: 4 May 1975 (age 51)
- Place of birth: Stryn, Norway
- Position: Forward

Senior career*
Years	Team	Apps	(Gls)
1994–1997	Brann	52	(14)
1997–1998	Sogndal	33	(9)
1999–2001	Bryne	47	(8)
2002	Åsane	22	(5)
2003–2005	Mandalskameratene	74	(13)

International career
1990	Norway G–15	10	(2)
1991	Norway G–16	3	(2)
1992	Norway G–17	8	(0)
1993–1994	Norway G–18	8	(0)
1994–1997	Norway U21	6	(4)
- * Club domestic league appearances and goals

Eivind Vorren Karlsbakk, born 4 May 1975, is a Norwegian former professional footballer who played as a forward. He is most known for his time years in Brann, but has also played for several other Norwegian clubs.

In the 1995 Norwegian Football Cup final, Karlsbakk was sent off by the referee Jon E. Skjervold. After reviewing the video replay the referee changed his report and Karlsbakk were allowed to play the re-match the following week.
