= Per-Ove Ludvigsen =

Norwegian footballer (born 1966)

Personal information
- Date of birth: 20 May 1966 (age 60)
- Place of birth: Bergen, Norway
- Positions: Centre-back; striker

Senior career*
Years	Team	Apps	(Gls)
1983–1993	Fyllingen Fotball		
1994–2001	Brann	111	(9)

International career
1990	Norway	1	(0)
- * Club domestic league appearances and goals

Per-Ove Ludvigsen (born 20 May 1966) is a Norwegian former footballer. He played for Brann, after joining from local rivals Fyllingen Fotball after the latter club's relegation from the Norwegian Premier League in the 1993 season. In the 1990 season he won the first ever Kniksen award as a defender. He sent Brann to the cup final in 1999 with a goal in extra time in the semi-finals against Molde FK. Ludvigsen was injured but had to play since Brann had used all its substitutes. He earned one cap for Norway in 1990.

After retiring in 2001, Ludvigsen was hired as Director of football at Brann. With his few comments in the media, Ludvigsen presented many surprising transfers, many at the end of the transfer-window. Some of the players Ludvigsen is credited to have contracted are Thorstein Helstad, Bengt Sæternes, Paul Scharner, Eirik Bakke, Seyi Olofinjana and Martin Andresen. On 2 November 2006, Ludvigsen surprisingly quit his job at Brann, saying that he took his part of the responsibility for Brann's lowly finishes in the Premiership in both 2005 and 2006. In 2007 the team won the Norwegian league.

Ludvigsen worked as a football agent, but returned to Brann as a scout from the 2018 season. He is a brother of Inge Ludvigsen.
