= Fyllingen Fotball =

Norwegian football club

Fyllingen
- Full name: Fyllingen Fotball
- Founded: 6 June 1946; 78 years ago
- Ground: Varden Amfi; Fyllingsdalen; Bergen
- Capacity: 3,500
Home colours	Away colours

Fyllingen Fotball is a Norwegian association football club from Fyllingsdalen, Bergen, Hordaland.

It was founded as a formally independent section of the alliance sports club Fyllingen IL on 1 January 1994. Fyllingen IL was founded on 6 June 1946. Fyllingen Fotball still uses Fyllingen IL's logo.

The club played in the Norwegian top flight in 1990, 1991 and 1993, and reached the Norwegian Cup final in 1990, where they lost 5–1 against Rosenborg. This earned them a place in the 1991–92 European Cup Winners' Cup, where they were eliminated by Atlético Madrid in the first round.

Fyllingen played in the 1. divisjon from 1994 to 1996 and in the 2. divisjon from 1997 till 2009. The last two seasons of its existence, the club played in the 3. divisjon. After the 2011 season, Fyllingen merged with Løv-Ham to create FK Fyllingsdalen, and the two clubs ceased to exist. The team was revived for the 2025 season, starting in the Seventh Division.

== Merger with Løv-Ham ==
Løv-Ham had in the recent years taken over Fyllingen's spot as Fyllingsdalen's best football-club, but it was still Fyllingen that had the biggest support and the financial power in the borough. In the end of 2007, the two clubs started negotiation to merge the football-departments of the two clubs. If this had been a reality the goal was a budget of at least 15 million, a doubling compared to the Løv-Ham's budget in 2007. The aim was to create an organization and a name that create a stable state football team, and which in time also be able to play up in the top division. The experiment stranded when it was not achieved sufficient majority at the extraordinary annual meeting of Fyllingen. Four years later, on 28 September 2011, the members of both clubs' voted yes to a merge. The new club replaced Løv-Ham in the 2012 2. divisjon, and the two old clubs will ceased to exist. Kjetil Knutsen became head coach of the new team.

== European Cup appearances ==
Season	Competition	Round	Country	Club	Home	Away	Aggregate
1991–92	UEFA Cup Winners' Cup	1. round	(Spain)	Atlético Madrid	0–1	2–7	2–8

== Recent history, men's team ==
Season		Pos.	Pl.	W	D	L	GS	GA	P	Cup	Notes
2001	2. divisjon, section 2	4	26	14	6	6	63	48	48	2nd round	
2002	2. divisjon, section 3	3	26	14	4	8	65	63	46	1st round	
2003	2. divisjon, section 3	5	26	11	5	10	61	56	38	2nd round	
2004	2. divisjon, section 3	5	26	12	2	12	56	59	38	1st round	
2005	2. divisjon, section 3	5	26	11	7	8	45	33	40	2nd round	
2006	2. divisjon, section 3	4	26	13	6	7	46	38	45	2nd round	
2007	2. divisjon, section 3	5	26	11	7	8	38	42	40	1st round	
2008	2. divisjon, section 3	5	26	11	6	9	45	51	39	1st round	
2009	2. divisjon, section 3	↓ 12	26	8	3	15	37	64	27	2nd round	Relegated to 3. divisjon
2010	3. divisjon, section Hordaland 2	2	22	15	2	5	63	24	47	3rd round	
2011	3. divisjon, section 7	2	26	20	4	2	90	24	64	2nd round	
