= SK Brann =

Norwegian association football club

Brann
- Full name: Sportsklubben Brann
- Nicknames: Bergens Stolthet (The Pride of Bergen); Fotballrepublikken (The Football Republic)
- Short name: Brann
- Founded: 26 September 1908; 118 years ago, as Ski- og Fotboldklubben Brann
- Ground: Brann Stadion, Bergen
- Capacity: 17,950
- Chairman: Arild Mjøs Andersen
- Manager: Eirik Horneland
- League: Eliteserien
- 2025: Eliteserien, 4th of 16
- Website: www.brann.no
Home colours	Away colours

Sportsklubben Brann is a Norwegian professional football club based in Bergen. Founded on 26 September 1908, Brann has played in the first tier of Norwegian football for 67 out of 80 seasons, the second most of any club. They play their home matches at Brann Stadion where they had a record-breaking average attendance of 17,310 in the 2007 season, the season in which they won their first league title since 1963.

== History ==
As the biggest club in Norway's second-largest city Bergen, Brann are historically one of the major clubs in Norway in terms of public interest, and hence there are high expectations for the club every season. Brann won their first Norwegian top flight titles in 1961–62 and 1963 Norwegian First Division, but after this Brann was only sporadically involved in the league title races. In 2007 they finally reclaimed the league title and thus ended a 44-year-long waiting period.

Despite their limited success, the club has never failed to spark considerable interest from the Norwegian media and the local population. Moreover, Brann have regularly been winners and runners-up of the Norwegian Cup. The club reached the quarter-finals of the Cup Winners' Cup in the 1996–97 season. The club has also earned a reputation for instability and drama both behind the scenes and on the pitch. Although the club has played the 2nd highest amount of seasons in the top flight, they have also been relegated from it 11 times, a feat only surpassed by Start.

=== Early years (1908–1959) ===
On 26 September 1908 Christen K. Gran gathered nine other young men to meet in a local café in Bergen. Due to dissatisfaction of the current state of the local sport clubs in Bergen, they decided to form a new football and skiing club. They called it Ski- og Fodboldklubben Brann (lit. The Ski and Football Club Fire), on the suggestion of Birger Gjestland.

Brann played their first match against Bergens Fotballklubb (at the time the biggest local team) on New Year's Day 1909, drawing 1–1. Brann recorded their first ever win in August of the same year, winning 3–2 against Stavanger IF away.

On 25 May 1919, with funding contributed by fans and investors, Brann Stadion was opened on a plot of land the club purchased in 1917. The opening match was against the Norwegian national team, losing 2–6, and the stadium also hosted the 1919 Norwegian Athletics Championships. In 1923 Brann reached the cup final for the third time, where they again faced an eastern team, this time finally winning. They beat Lyn 2–1 in the newly built Odd stadion, and secured the club's first ever national title. Two years later Brann again faced Sarpsborg in the 1925 cup final, this time winning 3–0 and securing their second national title.

Brann faced a period of stagnation during the 1930s. In 1937 Brann played in the first ever national Norwegian football league, but did not make it out of the local division. During the German occupation of Norway official sports activities were boycotted en masse after the occupying government seized control of the national sporting confederation, and club activities were thus reduced to unofficial gatherings for the duration of World War II.

Brann continued to play in the now smaller and more competitive national top division in the years after the war, until they were relegated for the first time in 1949. They were immediately promoted, and only months later they qualified for their fifth cup final after a 25-year absence, where they lost 0–3 to Fredrikstad. Brann won their division in the 1951–52 Norwegian Main League, and therefore qualified for the league championship final for the first time. They once again faced Fredrikstad and lost, this time 1–3. In the 1952–53 season Brann finished second to last in their division and were relegated from the top flight for the second time, but were once again immediately promoted the season afterwards. They were relegated for a third time in the 1955–56 season and were yet again promoted after a season's absence. The 1959–60 season saw the debut of 17-year-old future club legend Roald "Kniksen" Jensen, but Brann were nonetheless relegated for a fourth time and were as usual immediately promoted.

=== First league wins and long stay in the 2nd tier (1960s) ===
The 1960s saw two of Norway's most prolific players playing for Brann. With Roald "Kniksen" Jensen and Rolf Birger "Pesen" Pedersen on the team, Brann won their first league trophy in the so-called 1961–62 "marathon league", where all 16 top division teams played in a single league for the first time, with half being relegated. Brann defended their title in the first regular season of single-division top flight football in 1963, adding a second league trophy to their cabinet. During the 1963 season, Brann had an average attendance of 15,486, which was the league record until 2003, when Rosenborg finally beat it with an average of 15,582.

In 1964, Brann were among the favourites to win their third consecutive league championship, but due to many injured players the team only won one of the first nine league games. Brann continued to struggle with injuries throughout the season, and were soon firmly stuck in the relegation battle.

Brann would not play in the top division again until 1968, the last with club legend Oddvar Hansen at the helm.

=== Cup finals, title races and the "yo-yo" years (1970–1990) ===
After some mediocre seasons Brann once again reached the cup final after more than 20 years of absence in 1972. They faced Rosenborg and won 1–0, securing their third cup title. This led to Brann qualifying for the 1973–74 European Cup Winners' Cup, their first qualification for a European tournament. They beat Gzira United 9–0 on aggregate before being eliminated by Glentoran in the second round. In 1974 the club's athletics department was disbanded. In each of the seasons 1974–1976, Brann narrowly missed out on the league title, attracting an average attendance that was unheard of in Norway at the time. Although they missed out on the league title Brann won their fourth cup title in 1976, beating Sogndal in the final. Brann reached the final again in 1978, but lost to Lillestrøm.

With the 1980s came Brann's "yo-yo" era. Brann were relegated in 1979 and subsequently won the 2nd division in 1980, before being relegated again in 1981. The club would continue to alternate between the 1st and 2nd division every season until they finally avoided relegation in 1987. This was the world record for consecutive relegations and promotions from a top tier division until it was beaten by Aris Limassol in 2006. While in the 2nd division Brann won the cup for a fifth time in 1982, beating Molde in the final. In 1987 the skiing department disbanded, making Brann a club dedicated solely to football. Brann reached the cup final two consecutive seasons (1987 and 1988), where they lost to Bryne and Rosenborg respectively.

Brann had not had any real challenge from local rivals since the 1950s, being Bergen's only representatives in the top tier. In 1989, however, Bergen-based Fyllingen were promoted to the first tier for the first time.

=== Derbies, medals and brief European success (1990s) ===
In 1990, Brann were involved in a decisive match against Rosenborg in the final round where they had the chance to clinch the league title, but lost and ended fourth. They lost out on their first medals since 1976 as local rivals Fyllingen conceded two vital goals against Molde in stoppage time. Only weeks prior to this, Fyllingen had beaten Brann in the Cup semi-finals, and their outspoken ambitions to take over the football hegemony in Bergen had by now become a major annoyance for Brann.

In 1991, after a shock resignation of manager Teitur Thordarson, Brann once again struggled, and needed a win in their last game against Strømsgodset in order make the play-off spots against two second-tier teams and avoid direct relegation. Losing the game would send Brann down, while securing play-offs for equally struggling local rivals Fyllingen. There were also fears that a relegation would spawn another long-term "yo-yo era". A panic-stricken crowd saw Brann win the game 2–0. In the play-offs, though beating Strindheim at home, Brann still needed to beat Bryne away in a deciding match. A goal by Sten Glenn Håberg gave Brann a 1–0 win over Bryne, securing their survival.

In 1993 Brann got their two first-ever wins against their local rivals Fyllingen. A 6–1 thrashing in the penultimate league round sent Fyllingen down, while securing continued top division status for Brann. After the season, Brann purchased Fyllingen's key player Per-Ove Ludvigsen, and this put an end to Fyllingen's adventures in the top tier and the derby matches.

In 1996, as in 1990, Brann were denied bronze medals in injury time of the last game, after a terrible blunder by keeper Birkir Kristinsson. Only days later, however, Brann beat PSV Eindhoven of the Netherlands to advance to the quarterfinals of the Cup Winners' Cup, thanks to world-class goalkeeping by the same Birkir Kristinsson. This was the second time a Norwegian team had qualified for the last eight in Europe. In the quarterfinals, Brann first drew 1–1 at home against Liverpool, before losing the away match 3–0 and thus being knocked out. The 1997 season saw Brann finish as runner-up in the league, their first finish in the top 3 since 1976. Due to Rosenborg's dominance of Norwegian football at the time a silver medal was given high apprecation.

In 1998, as in 1995, Brann found themselves at the bottom of the table halfway through the season. Kjell Tennfjord was replaced by Harald Aabrekk as head coach, and a host of quality players were purchased. This saved Brann from relegation, but combined with the construction of a new stand on Brann Stadion it also caused significant financial issues for the club. Brann faced German giants Werder Bremen in the first round of the 1998–99 UEFA Cup, where they won a strong 2–0 victory at home in the first leg, only to concede four goals in the second leg and be sent home. In 1999 Brann once again faced Rosenborg in the cup final, and for their third cup final in a row saw themselves beaten by the club from Trondheim.

=== First title in decades and an end to 44 years of waiting (2000s) ===
Teitur Thordarson returned as manager in 2000 after the departure of Harald Aabrekk. For the second time in four seasons, Brann became runners-up, secured after defeating Molde 4–0 in the last game of the season. Thorstein Helstad became the league's top goalscorer in 2000 and 2001.

The 2002 season was the worst season for Brann in twelve seasons. They finished third from the bottom and had to face Sandefjord in a play-off to stay in the top tier. Brann narrowly avoided relegation thanks to a 2–1 home win after the first leg had ended with a 0–0 draw. A third-place finish in the 2004 season saw Brann qualify for the newly formed and short-lived Scandinavian Royal League.

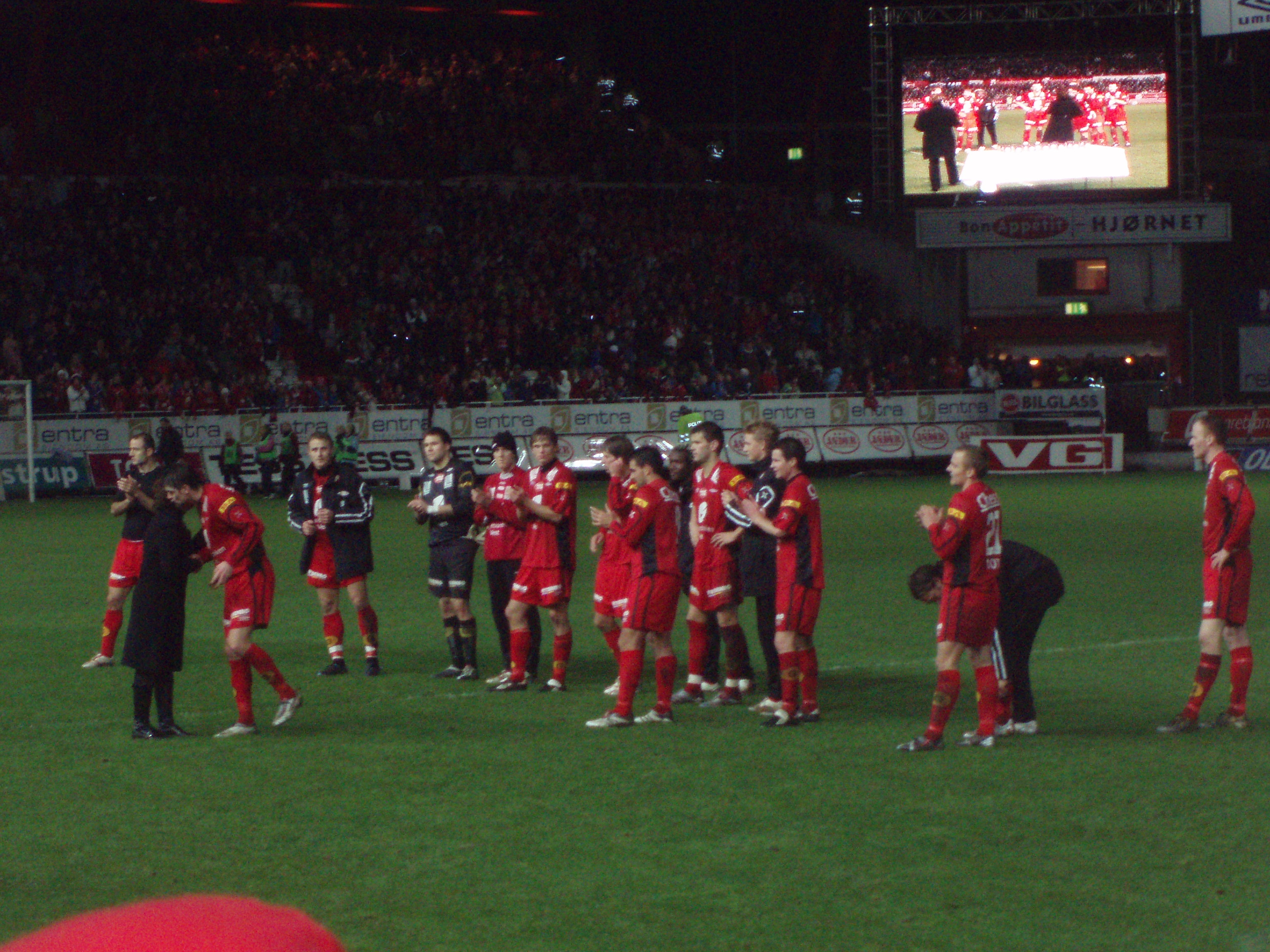
SK Brann celebrates their second-place finish in 2006 after a victory over HamKam

In their struggle to reclaim the glory of the 1960s, Brann over the years gained a reputation for inept leadership, unfounded enthusiasm or optimism and almost continuous internal unrest, deservedly or not. After former Brann player Mons Ivar Mjelde took over as manager in 2003, however, this image changed, as the leadership embraced continuity and down-to-earth principles. Brann were now considered one of the best-run and harmonic clubs in Norway.

Being one of the biggest clubs in Norway in terms of public interest, it is generally agreed that Brann have underperformed compared to their potential at least since the mid-1970s. However, on 7 November 2004, Brann won their first title in 22 years, defeating Oslo side Lyn 4–1 in the Norwegian Cup. Bengt Sæternes scored a hat-trick within the first 35 minutes, becoming man of the match.

For most of the 2006 season Brann were top of the league by a wide margin and considered favourites to win the title. However, a poor run of form after the summer break, coupled with a correspondingly good run of form from rivals Rosenborg meant that Brann's hopes were dashed, and in the end Rosenborg comfortably won the league.

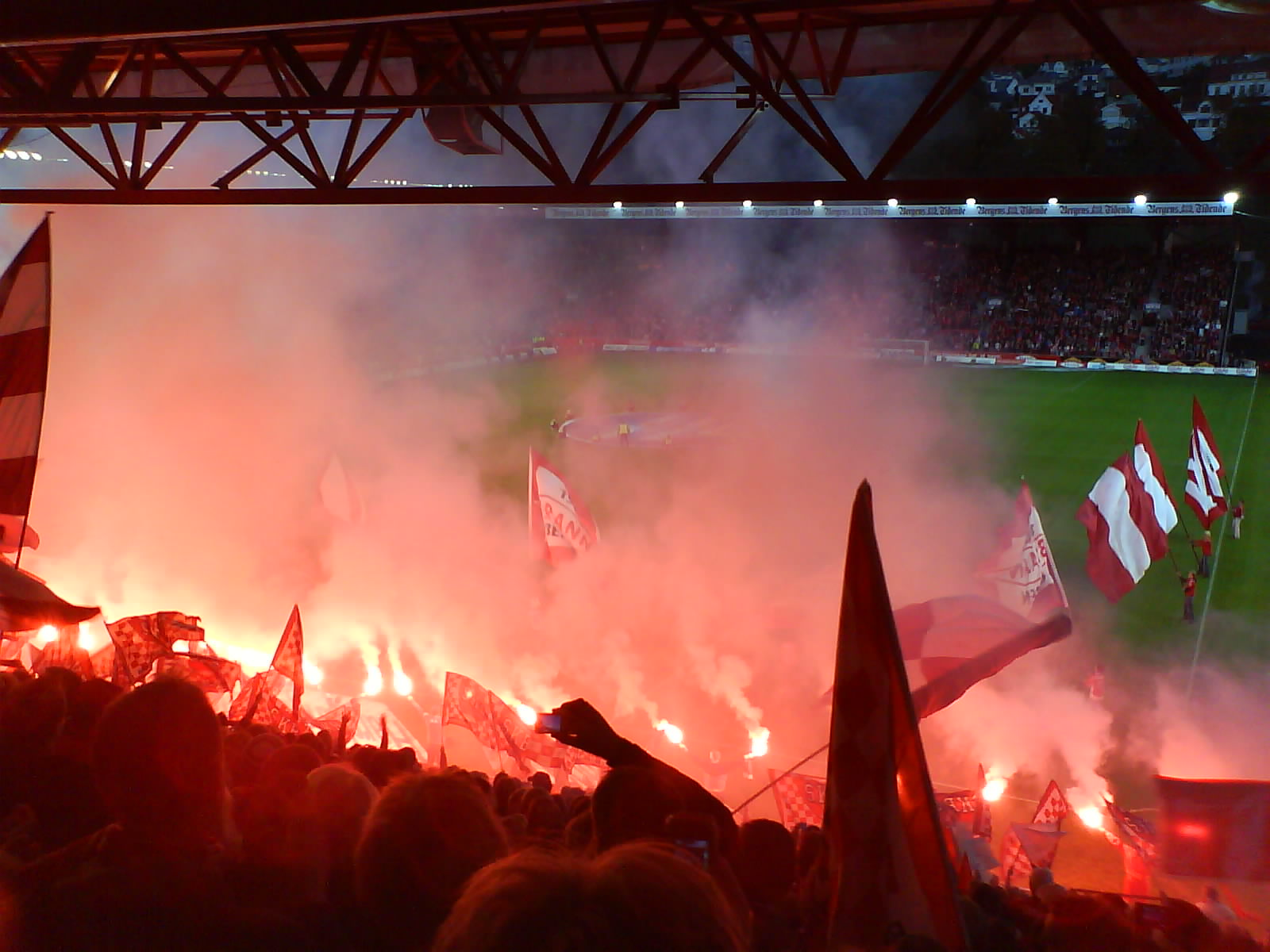
Brann vs Lyn in 2007

Brann finally won the league in 2007, ending a 44-year waiting period for one of Norway's biggest football clubs. The club did however manage to characteristically disappoint even when succeeding, causing bitter disappointment among tens of thousands of Brann supporters who had gathered in Bergen to watch the game live by losing to relegation-threatened Aalesund in the second to last round, a match where a draw would have given Brann the league title. Two days later however, Viking defeated eventual silver medalists Stabæk, securing Brann their first league championship since 1963. The same season Brann also qualified for the group stage of the UEFA Cup, and advanced from the group with a win and a draw, knocking out merited sides Club Brugge, Dinamo Zagreb and Stade Rennais on the way. Brann faced a tough test against Everton in the round of 32, losing 8–1 on aggregate.

The 2008 season was a major disappointment for all the fans hoping to repeat the success of the 2007 season. In the league Brann finished eighth, and in the cup they were eliminated in the round of 16 after being trashed in 8–0 loss away to Molde. Brann also participated in the UEFA Champions League qualifier, but were eliminated from the contest in the third qualifying round after losing 3–1 on aggregate against Marseille. After this they played against Deportivo de La Coruña in the first round of the UEFA Cup, and were eliminated on penalties after an aggregate result of 2–2. On 7 October 2008 Brann and their head coach Mons Ivar Mjelde announced that he would resign from the club at the end of the season.

Steinar Nilsen took over for Mjelde, and lead Brann to a fifth place in the league in the 2009 season.

=== Rebuilding, relegation and promotion (2010s) ===
The 2010 season was a poor season for Brann. On 19 May the club were surprisingly knocked out of the cup after losing 0–1 to former rivals Fyllingen, now an amateur team in the fourth tier. Head coach Steinar Nilsen resigned two days later, and was replaced by Rune Skarsfjord. Brann ended the season in 13th place, barely avoiding the relegation play-offs.

Expectations for Brann were low ahead of the 2011 season. Nonetheless, Brann opened the season strongly with victories over reigning league champion Rosenborg and Lillestrøm in the first and second rounds. Although the season did not continue quite as strongly, Brann remained a contender for a top three position in the league and the team also qualified for its 15th cup final. Brann lost the final against Aalesund, and then the last match of the league, also against Aalesund. This resulted in Brann missing out on a medal in the league and finishing 4th. The season was also marred by Brann player Carl-Erik Torp suffering a cardiac arrest on the pitch against Sogndal, only narrowly surviving and having to retire from professional football afterwards. After mediocre results in 2012 and 2013, Skarsfjord resigned from the manager position at the end of the season.

On 3 December 2013 Swedish manager Rikard Norling signed a contract with Brann lasting until the end of the 2016 season. The signing was met with enormous optimism by fans and pundits as Norling had recently won Allsvenskan with Malmö, and most pundits predicted a finish in the top half with chances of fighting for the medals. The 2014 season however ended disastrously with relegation for the first time in 29 years. Brann had a difficult year throughout and were in the direct relegation spots for most of the season. A crucial win over Sogndal in the penultimate round lifted them to 14th place, a play-off spot, and a last round win over Haugesund ensured it, allowing Brann a chance of salvaging a berth in next year's Tippeligaen through a qualifying match against challenger Mjøndalen who had finished third in the second tier. The first leg at home in Bergen ended in a 1–1 draw, while the second leg away ended in a 3–0 victory for Mjøndalen. This result meant that Mjøndalen were promoted at the expense of Brann who were relegated, ending the longest top tier streak in the club's history.

Norling still had support amongst fans, with the blame mostly being put on decisions made by the club leadership and board, who resigned after the relegation was confirmed. The following season the team continued to struggle, and in the end Norling was sacked on 27 May 2015 after a 4–1 loss against Levanger left Brann 9th in the table and 9 points behind league leader Sogndal.

On 29 May 2015, Lars Arne Nilsen was hired as interim manager, and for the rest of the season, Brann performed well, eventually ending on second place and ensuring promotion with two rounds left of the season. The day after the season ended, on 2 November 2015, Nilsen was given a three-year contract.

The 2016 season saw Brann collect a shock silver medal right after promotion, only losing one game at home all season in a year where most experts predicted a struggle for survival. Nilsen's Brann side continued to perform well in 2017, eventually ending in 5th place after fighting for medals until the very end and at one point leading the league. In 2018 Brann were leading the league for large portions of the season, at certain points being 7 points clear of second place. After key player Sivert Heltne Nilsen (son of manager Lars Arne Nilsen) was sold to Danish mid-table side Horsens for a relatively small sum under controversial circumstances Brann saw a collapse in form, and ended up finishing in 3rd after spending 25 consecutive rounds in the top 2 positions. Brann continued to struggle in the 2019 season, in the end finishing in a disappointing 9th place.

=== Relegation, cup title and silverware (2020s) ===
The 2020 season was delayed as a result of the COVID-19 pandemic. The season finally started in June, and was played for mostly empty stadiums with only 200–600 spectators. Although Nilsen had given Brann initially good results, attendance figures had steadily dropped under Nilsen's tenure as manager in large part due to his style of football being considered boring, risk-averse and frustrating to watch. Fan opinion of him had soured, and after a disappointing end to the past two seasons patience for his project was wearing thin. After a loss to rivals Vålerenga in round 12 saw Brann in 8th with no wins in 5 games, Nilsen departed from the club and was replaced by Kåre Ingebrigtsen, who recently had great success with Rosenborg. He was however not able to replicate this success at Brann, only collecting 1 win in his first 11 games, and Brann were suddenly in the middle of a relegation struggle. An uptick in form towards the end of the season saw Brann avoid the relegation fight and finish in 10th, but alarm bells were ringing ahead of the 2021 season.

The 2021 season was perhaps the most infamous in Brann's history, dubbed "the worst Brann year in peacetime" and Brannus horribilis by local media. It included a controversial extraordinary general meeting, a season-long relegation struggle, the departure from the club of a sporting director, a manager and a squad-wide afterparty scandal.

Sporting director Rune Soltvedt left the club in February after internal conflicts, leaving the club without a sporting director during the winter transfer window.

The start of the season was catastrophic, with Brann collecting no points in their first six matches. By round 14 Brann had only collected 7 points and were firmly stuck in the relegation spots. Ingebrigtsen was sacked, and his assistant coach Eirik Horneland was made interim head coach, later being given the position permanently. The summer transfer window saw newly hired sporting director Jimmi Nagel Jacobsen sign multiple signings to help save the club from relegation, including a return to the club for Sivert Heltne Nilsen, Bård Finne and Fredrik Pallesen Knudsen.

Brann saw some improvement in results in the latter half of the season, but not enough to get clear of the relegation spots. Heading into the final game of the season Brann not only needed a win against Sarpsborg, but needed 14th-placed Stabæk to not win against 13th-placed Odd who had already secured their place and had nothing to play for. Brann took a 2–0 lead early in the 2nd half by two successive goals by local talents Aune Heggebø and David Møller Wolfe, and although Sarpsborg scored a later goal Brann ended up winning 2–1. Meanwhile, Odd comfortably beat Stabæk 3–1, meaning Brann had miraculously secured a relegation play-off from what looked like certain doom.

Brann faced Jerv in the play-off final, a small team from Grimstad with no experience in the top tier, which meant Brann were considered heavy favourites. Due to the COVID restrictions the usual two-leg structure of the play-offs was abandoned in favour of a single game played on neutral ground at Intility Arena in Oslo. The dramatic game ended 4–4, and Brann's future was to be decided on penalties. Jerv were promoted to the top tier for the first time in club history while Brann were once again relegated.

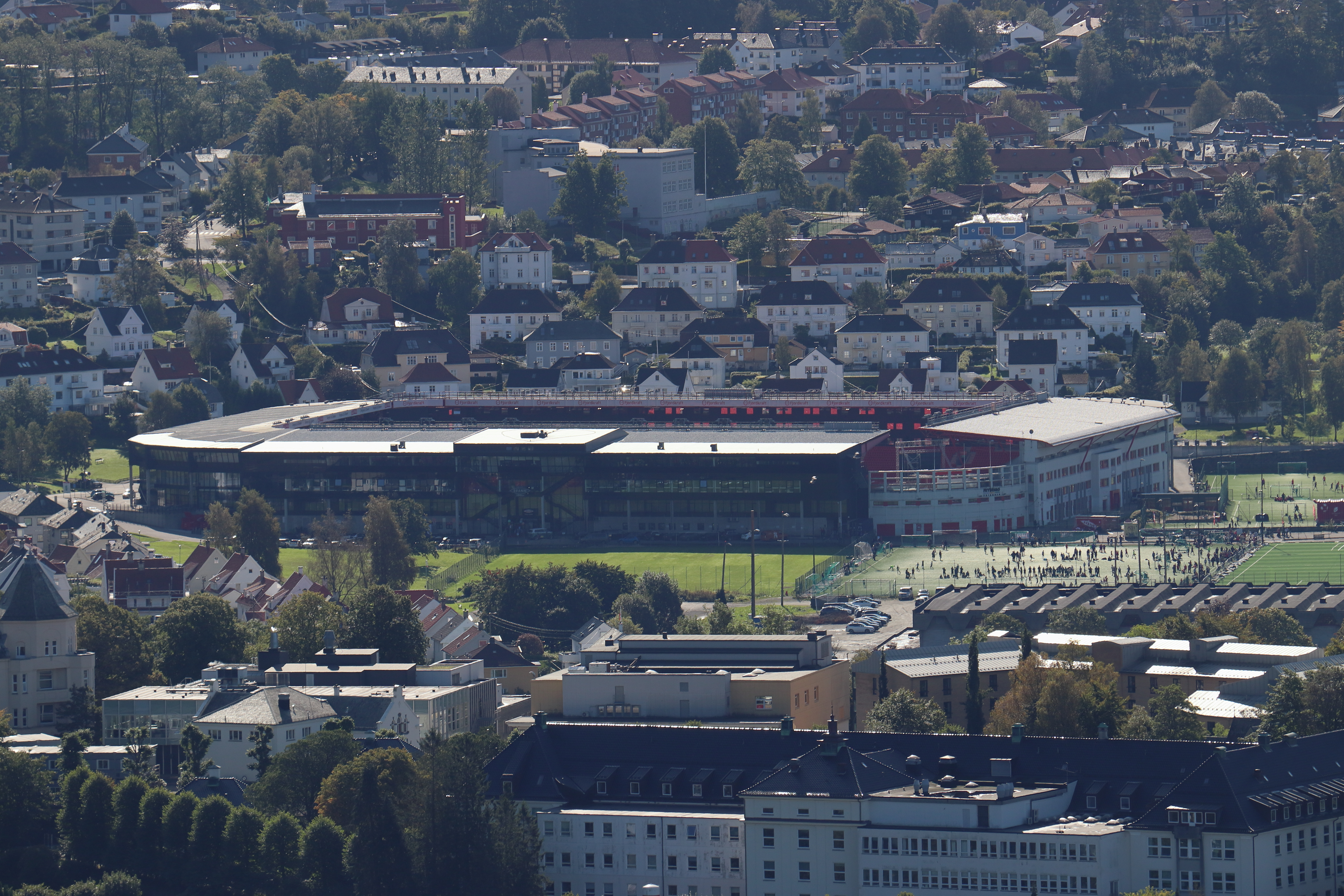
Brann Stadion in September 2023

Brann's 2022 season in the 2nd tier was much more successful than their previous one in 2015, and they were easily promoted in the most successful 2nd tier season in Norwegian football history, only losing one game. The records for points scored, goals scored and highest average attendance in the 2nd tier were all broken. 2022 also saw Brann's first venture into women's football with the adoption of Sandviken's women's team, which was renamed to SK Brann Kvinner and later fully merged into the club.

The 2023 season once again saw Brann earn a silver medal straight after promotion. Brann challenged Bodø/Glimt for the top spot for parts of the season, but after a poor run of form in July they had to struggle against Viking and Tromsø for the silver medal, which they eventually won. Brann qualified for the delayed 2022 cup final, where they comfortably beat Lillestrøm 2–0, earning the club its first major trophy on the men's side since 2007.

On 27 August 2025, Brann secured qualification to the Europa League League Phase for the first time in their history after defeating AEK Larnaca 6-1 on aggregate.

== Players and staff ==
=== Current squad ===
As of 3 September 2026

Note: Flags indicate national team as defined under FIFA eligibility rules; some limited exceptions apply. Players may hold more than one non-FIFA nationality.

No.	Pos.	Nation	Player
1	GK	NOR	Mathias Dyngeland
2	DF	NOR	Leo Cornic
3	DF	NOR	Fredrik Pallesen Knudsen (captain)
4	DF	GHA	Nana Kwame Boakye
5	MF	NOR	Sakarias Opsahl
7	MF	ISL	Kjartan Már Kjartansson
8	MF	NOR	Sondre Tronstad
9	FW	CHI	Niklas Castro
10	FW	ISL	Kristall Máni Ingason
11	FW	NOR	Bård Finne
12	GK	NOR	Simen Vidtun Nilsen
14	MF	NOR	Ulrik Mathisen
15	DF	NOR	Jonas Torsvik
16	FW	NOR	Kristian Eriksen

No.	Pos.	Nation	Player
17	DF	NOR	Joachim Soltvedt
18	MF	DEN	Jacob Lungi Sørensen
19	MF	ISL	Eggert Aron Guðmundsson
20	DF	NOR	Vetle Dragsnes
21	DF	NED	Neraysho Kasanwirjo
22	FW	ISL	Sævar Atli Magnússon
23	DF	NOR	Thore Pedersen
25	MF	NOR	Niklas Jensen Wassberg
29	FW	NOR	Noah Holm
30	FW	NGR	Chinedu Cyprain Ononogbo
33	GK	NED	Tom Bramel
36	GK	NOR	Håkon Hellesøy
39	FW	NOR	Julian Lægreid

For season transfers, see transfers winter 2025–26 and transfers summer 2026

=== Out on loan ===
Note: Flags indicate national team as defined under FIFA eligibility rules; some limited exceptions apply. Players may hold more than one non-FIFA nationality.

No.	Pos.	Nation	Player
2	DF	NOR	Martin Hellan (at Sandefjord until 31 December 2026)
6	DF	SEN	Cheikh Mbacké Diop (at Aalesund until 31 December 2026)
24	GK	NOR	Mathias Klausen (at Åsane until 31 December 2026)

No.	Pos.	Nation	Player
32	MF	NOR	Markus Haaland (at Häcken until 31 December 2026)
40	MF	NOR	Jesper Eikrem (at Åsane until 31 December 2026)
41	MF	NOR	Lars Remmem (at Haugesund until 31 December 2026)

=== Coaching staff ===
As of 15 July 2026

Sports director: Per-Ove Ludvigsen
Head coach: Eirik Horneland
Assistant coach: Morten Kalvenes
Assistant coach: Erik Huseklepp
Player developer: Hassan El Fakiri
Player developer: Daniel Pedersen
Physical trainer: Helge Haugen
Goalkeeper coach: Dan Riisnes
Analyst: Håvard Thunes Lilletvedt
Equipment manager: Raymond Sanden
Liaison officer: André Gundersen
Doctor: Arne Instebø
Doctor: Asle Kjellsen
Physiotherapist: Robert Dyvik
Physiotherapist: Eirik Hesthammer
Massage therapist: Bjørn Rune Skråmestø

== Honours ==
=== League ===
- Eliteserien:
  - Winners (3): 1961–62, 1963, 2007
  - Runners-up (8): 1951–52, 1975, 1997, 2000, 2006, 2016, 2023, 2024
  - Third place: (4): 1976, 1999, 2004, 2018
- Norwegian First Division:
  - Winners (1): 2022
  - Runners-up (1): 2015
- Kretsserien: (Note: Prior to the 1937–38 League of Norway the highest level of league play in Norway were various regional leagues organised by local footballing associations.)
  - Winners (22): 1912, 1913, 1914, 1915, 1916, 1917, 1918, 1919, 1920, 1921, 1922, 1923, 1924, 1926, 1927, 1928, 1929, 1930, 1932, 1934, 1935, 1937
  - Runners-up (5): 1911, 1925, 1931, 1933, 1936

=== Cup ===
- Norwegian Cup:
  - Winners (7): 1923, 1925, 1972, 1976, 1982, 2004, 2022
  - Runners-up (10): 1917, 1918, 1950, 1978, 1987, 1988, 1995, 1999, 2011, 2025-26

== Recent seasons ==
Season	League	Pos.	Pl.	W	D	L	GS	GA	P	Cup	Europe		Notes
2017	Eliteserien	5	30	13	8	9	51	36	47	Fourth round	EL	Second qualification round	
2018	Eliteserien	3	30	17	7	6	45	31	58	Fourth round			
2019	Eliteserien	9	30	10	10	10	32	37	40	Fourth round	EL	First qualification round	
2020	Eliteserien	10	30	9	9	12	40	49	36	Cancelled			
2021	Eliteserien	↓ 14	30	5	11	14	38	55	26	Fourth round			Relegated to the First Division
2022	First Division	↑ 1	30	26	3	1	95	16	81	Winner			Promoted to Eliteserien
2023	Eliteserien	2	30	19	4	7	55	35	61	Quarterfinal	ECL	Play-off round	
2024	Eliteserien	2	30	17	8	5	55	33	59	Third round	ECL	Play-off round	
2025	Eliteserien	4	30	17	5	8	55	46	56	Third round	CL EL	Second qualification round League Phase	
2026 (ongoing)	Eliteserien	7	25	10	2	13	45	42	32	Runner-up	ECL	Play-off round	

- CL: UEFA Champions League
- EL: UEFA Europa League
- ECL: UEFA Conference League

== In European football ==
Brann's first competitive European match was a 2–0 victory (9–0 on aggregate) over Gzira United in the 1973-74 European Cup Winners' Cup. The club's most successful European efforts came at the 1996-97 UEFA Cup Winners' Cup when the club advanced to the quarterfinals, and the 2007-08 UEFA Cup, with the club advancing to the Round of 32.

=== Results ===
All results (away, home and aggregate) list the club's goal tally first.

Season	Competition	Round	Club	Home	Away	Aggregate
1973–74	European Cup Winners' Cup	First Round	(Malta) Gzira United	7–0	2–0^{f}	9–0
1973–74	European Cup Winners' Cup	Second Round	(Northern Ireland) Glentoran	1–1^{f}	1–3	2–4
1976–77	UEFA Cup	First Round	(England) Queens Park Rangers	0–7	0–4^{f}	0–11
1977–78	European Cup Winners' Cup	First Round	(Iceland) ÍA	1–0^{f}	4–0	5–0
1977–78	European Cup Winners' Cup	Second Round	(Netherlands) Twente	1–2	0–2^{f}	1–4
1983–84	European Cup Winners' Cup	First Round	(Netherlands) NEC	0–1	1–1^{f}	1–2
1989–90	European Cup Winners' Cup	First Round	(Italy) Sampdoria	0–2^{f}	0–1	0–3
1996–97	UEFA Cup Winners' Cup	Qualifying Round	(Republic of Ireland) Shelbourne	2–1	3–1^{f}	5–2
1996–97	UEFA Cup Winners' Cup	First Round	(Belgium) Cercle Brugge	4–0	2–3^{f}	6–3
1996–97	UEFA Cup Winners' Cup	Second Round	(Netherlands) PSV	2–1^{f}	2–2	4–3
1996–97	UEFA Cup Winners' Cup	Quarter-finals	(England) Liverpool	1–1^{f}	0–3	1–4
1997–98	UEFA Cup	First Qualifying Round	(Bulgaria) Naftex Burgas	2–1^{f}	2–3	4–4 (a)
1997–98	UEFA Cup	Second Qualifying Round	(Switzerland) Grasshoppers	2–0	0–3^{f}	2–3
1998–99	UEFA Cup	Second Qualifying Round	(Lithuania) Žalgiris	1–0^{f}	0–0	1–0
1998–99	UEFA Cup	First Round	(Germany) Werder Bremen	2–0^{f}	0–4 (a.e.t.)	2–4
1999	UEFA Intertoto Cup	Second Round	(Croatia) Varteks	3–0^{f}	0–3 (a.e.t.)	3–3 (4–5 p)
2000–01	UEFA Cup	Qualifying Round	(Latvia) Liepājas Metalurgs	1–0	1–1^{f}	2–1
2000–01	UEFA Cup	First Round	(Switzerland) Basel	4–4	2–3^{f}	6–7
2001–02	UEFA Champions League	Second Qualifying Round	(Bulgaria) Levski Sofia	1–1	0–0^{f}	1–1 (a)
2002–03	UEFA Cup	Qualifying Round	(Lithuania) Sūduva	2–3^{f}	2–3	4–6
2005–06	UEFA Cup	Second Qualifying Round	(Finland) Allianssi	0–0^{f}	2–0	2–0
2005–06	UEFA Cup	First Round	(Russia) Lokomotiv Moscow	1–2^{f}	2–3	3–5
2006–07	UEFA Cup	First Qualifying Round	(Northern Ireland) Glentoran	1–0	1–0^{f}	2–0
2006–07	UEFA Cup	Second Qualifying Round	(Sweden) Åtvidaberg	3–3^{f}	1–1	4–4 (a)
2007–08	UEFA Cup	First Qualifying Round	(Wales) Carmarthen Town	6–3	8–0^{f}	14–3
2007–08	UEFA Cup	Second Qualifying Round	(Lithuania) Sūduva	2–1^{f}	4–3	6–4
2007–08	UEFA Cup	First Round	(Belgium) Club Brugge	0–1^{f}	2–1	2–2 (a)
2007–08	UEFA Cup	Group Stage (Group D)	(Germany) Hamburg	0–1	—N/a	3rd
2007–08	UEFA Cup	Group Stage (Group D)	(France) Stade Rennais	—N/a	1–1	3rd
2007–08	UEFA Cup	Group Stage (Group D)	(Croatia) Dinamo Zagreb	2–1	—N/a	3rd
2007–08	UEFA Cup	Group Stage (Group D)	(Switzerland) Basel	—N/a	0–1	3rd
2007–08	UEFA Cup	Round of 32	(England) Everton	0–2^{f}	1–6	1–8
2008–09	UEFA Champions League	Second Qualifying Round	(Latvia) Ventspils	1–0^{f}	1–2	2–2 (a)
2008–09	UEFA Champions League	Third Qualifying Round	(France) Marseille	0–1^{f}	1–2	1–3
2008–09	UEFA Cup	First Round	(Spain) Deportivo La Coruña	2–0^{f}	0–2 (a.e.t.)	2–2 (2–3 p)
2017–18	UEFA Europa League	Second Qualifying Round	(Slovakia) Ružomberok	0–2	1–0^{f}	1–2
2019–20	UEFA Europa League	First Qualifying Round	(Republic of Ireland) Shamrock Rovers	2–2^{f}	1–2	3–4
2023–24	UEFA Conference League	Third Qualifying Round	(Portugal) Arouca	3–1	1–2^{f}	4–3
2023–24	UEFA Conference League	Play-off Round	(Netherlands) AZ	3–3 (a.e.t.)	1–1^{f}	4–4 (5–6 p)
2024–25	UEFA Conference League	Second Qualifying Round	(Netherlands) Go Ahead Eagles	2–1	0–0^{f}	2–1
2024–25	UEFA Conference League	Third Qualifying Round	(Scotland) St Mirren	3–1	1–1^{f}	4–2
2024–25	UEFA Conference League	Play-off Round	(Kazakhstan) Astana	2–0^{f}	0–3	2–3
2025–26	UEFA Champions League	Second Qualifying Round	(Austria) RB Salzburg	1–4^{f}	1–1	2–5
2025–26	UEFA Europa League	Third Qualifying Round	(Sweden) Häcken	0–1	2–0^{f}	2–1
2025–26	UEFA Europa League	Play-off Round	(Cyprus) AEK Larnaca	2–1^{f}	4–0	6–1
2025–26	UEFA Europa League	League Phase	(France) Lille	—N/a	1–2	24th
2025–26	UEFA Europa League	League Phase	(Netherlands) Utrecht	1–0	—N/a	24th
2025–26	UEFA Europa League	League Phase	(Scotland) Rangers	3–0	—N/a	24th
2025–26	UEFA Europa League	League Phase	(Italy) Bologna	—N/a	0–0	24th
2025–26	UEFA Europa League	League Phase	(Greece) PAOK	—N/a	1–1	24th
2025–26	UEFA Europa League	League Phase	(Turkey) Fenerbahçe	0–4	—N/a	24th
2025–26	UEFA Europa League	League Phase	(Denmark) Midtjylland	3–3	—N/a	24th
2025–26	UEFA Europa League	League Phase	(Austria) Sturm Graz	—N/a	0–1	24th
2025–26	UEFA Europa League	Knockout Phase Play-offs	(Italy) Bologna	0–1^{f}	0–1	0–2
2026–27	UEFA Conference League	Second Qualifying Round	(Romania) Universitatea Cluj	3–1	2–2^{f}	5–3
2026–27	UEFA Conference League	Third Qualifying Round	(Cyprus) Apollon Limassol	0–1^{f}	4–2 (a.e.t.)	4–3
2026–27	UEFA Conference League	Play-off Round	(Greece) PAOK	3–2	1–1^{f}	4–3
2026–27	UEFA Conference League	League Phase	(Gibraltar) Lincoln Red Imps	2–1	—N/a	TBD
2026–27	UEFA Conference League	League Phase	(Lithuania) Kauno Žalgiris	—N/a	4–1	TBD
2026–27	UEFA Conference League	League Phase	(Belgium) Sint-Truidense	—N/a	1–1	TBD
2026–27	UEFA Conference League	League Phase	(Denmark) AGF		—N/a	TBD
2026–27	UEFA Conference League	League Phase	(Portugal) Braga		—N/a	TBD
2026–27	UEFA Conference League	League Phase	(Belgium) Gent	—N/a		TBD

^{f} First leg. Colour key: Green = Brann win; Yellow = draw; Red = opponents win.

=== UEFA club coefficient ranking ===
As of 5 November 2026

Rank	Team	Coefficient
112	(Spain) Girona	17.298
113	(Spain) Osasuna	17.298
114	(Norway) Brann	17.250
115	(Germany) Hoffenheim	16.994
116	(Germany) Borussia Mönchengladbach	16.994

== Coaching history ==
SK Brann head coaches
Dates	Name	Notes
1908–1918	Unknown	
1919–1928	(Scotland) Donald Colman	Player-manager until 1922
1929–1935	Unknown	
1936	(Scotland) Adam McLean	
1937	Unknown	
1938–1939	(Austria) Karl Geyer	
1946–1947	(England) Tom Mitchell	
1947	(Northern Ireland) Billy Cook	
1948	(England) Alf Young	
1949	(Scotland) William Aitken	
1949–1951	(Northern Ireland) Billy Cook	Second stint
1951–1952	(Norway) Bjarne Osland (Norway) Kjeld Kjos	Co-managers
1953	(Norway) Bjarne Osland	
1954	(Austria) Karl Pannagl	
1955	(England) George Ainsley	
1955–1957	(Norway) Oddvar Hansen	Player-manager until 1956
1958	(Norway) Birger Nilsen	
1959	(Hungary) Tivadar Szentpetery	
1960–1963	(Norway) Oddvar Hansen	Second stint
1964	(Austria) Pepi Stroh	
1965–1968	(Norway) Oddvar Hansen	Third stint
1969–1972	(Slovakia) Karol Bučko	
1972–1973	(England) Ray Freeman	
1974–1978	(England) Billy Elliott	
1979	(Norway) Ivar Hoff	
1979	(Norway) Egil Austbø	
1980–1981	(England) Les Shannon	
1982–1983	(Norway) Arve Mokkelbost	
1984–1985	(Norway) Endre Blindheim	
1986–1987	(England) Tony Knapp	
1987	(Norway) Per Vold	Interim manager
1988–1990	(Iceland) Teitur Thordarson	
1991–1992	(Sweden) Karl Gunnar Björklund	
1993–1995	(Norway) Hallvar Thoresen	
1995–1998	(Norway) Kjell Tennfjord	
1998–1999	(Norway) Harald Aabrekk	
2000–2002	(Iceland) Teitur Thordarson	Second stint
2003–2008	(Norway) Mons Ivar Mjelde	
2009–2010	(Norway) Steinar Nilsen	
2010–2013	(Norway) Rune Skarsfjord	Interim manager, later given permanent contract
2014–2015	(Sweden) Rikard Norling	
2015–2020	(Norway) Lars Arne Nilsen	
2020–2021	(Norway) Kåre Ingebrigtsen	
2021–2024	(Norway) Eirik Horneland	Interim manager, later given permanent contract
2025–2026	(Iceland) Freyr Alexandersson	
2026–	(Norway) Eirik Horneland	Second stint

== Player statistics ==
=== Most appearances ===
As of 9 November 2026

Competitive matches only, appearances as a substitute in brackets. Players currently at the club in bold.

Players with most appearances for SK Brann
Rank	Player	Years	League	Cup	Europe	Other	Total
1	(Norway) Tore Nordtvedt	1963–1979	304 (3)	83 (5)	10 (1)	0	**397** (9)
2	(Norway) Geirmund "Geddi" Brendesæter	1991–2003	255 (21)	54 (4)	23 (0)	4 (2)	**336** (27)
3	(Norway) Erlend Hanstveit	1998–2008; 2014–2015	231 (20)	39 (1)	30 (2)	16 (2)	**316** (25)
4	(Norway) Erik Huseklepp	2005–2010; 2012–2016	248 (59)	28 (5)	23 (8)	9 (1)	**308** (73)
5	(Norway) Håkon Opdal	2001–2011; 2019–2021	234 (7)	28 (2)	20 (0)	14 (0)	**296** (9)
6	(Norway) Fredrik Haugen	2011–2020	249 (51)	20 (7)	4 (0)	3 (0)	**276** (58)
7	(Norway) Azar Karadas	1999–2001; 2007–2009; 2014–2019	206 (134)	31 (10)	24 (11)	2 (1)	**263** (156)
8	(Norway) Ruben Kristiansen	2015–2024	228 (8)	12 (1)	14 (0)	1 (0)	**255** (9)
9	(Norway) Kristoffer Barmen	2011–2021	225 (40)	22 (6)	2 (0)	1 (0)	**250** (46)
9	(Norway) Roy Wassberg	1989–1993; 1998–2004	201 (14)	33 (4)	13 (1)	3 (0)	**250** (19)

=== Top goalscorers ===
As of 9 November 2026

Competitive matches only. Matches played (including as a substitute) appear in brackets. Players currently at the club in bold.

Top goalscorers for SK Brann
Rank	Player	Years	League	Cup	Europe	Other	Total
1	(Norway) Finn Berstad	1918–1935	57 (39)	78 (66)	0 (0)	0 (0)	**135** (105)
2	(Norway) Rolf Birger "Pesen" Pedersen	1957–1968; 1972	86 (168)	42 (55)	0 (0)	2 (3)	**130** (226)
3	(Norway) Gunnar Skagen	1945–1956	69 (93)	48 (41)	0 (0)	6 (3)	**123** (137)
4	(Norway) Thorstein Helstad	1998–2002; 2006–2008	89 (147)	10 (17)	4 (23)	1 (4)	**104** (191)
5	(Norway) **Bård Finne**	2012–2013; 2021–present	62 (174)	32 (33)	3 (30)	0 (1)	**96** (238)
6	(Norway) Steinar Aase	1973–1978; 1984–1985	63 (154)	27 (40)	3 (6)	0 (0)	**93** (200)
7	(Norway) Bjørn Tronstad	1974–1982	62 (124)	28 (35)	2 (6)	0 (0)	**92** (165)
8	(Norway) Roald "Kniksen" Jensen	1960–1964; 1971–1973	61 (122)	24 (32)	1 (4)	1 (2)	**87** (160)
9	(Norway) Bjarne Johnsen	1916–1928; 1930–1932	33 (21)	51 (50)	0 (0)	0 (0)	**84** (71)
10	(Norway) Kåre Kongsvik	1921–1922; 1925–1932	39 (25)	35 (33)	0 (0)	0 (0)	**74** (58)

=== Player of the year ===
Since 2000, Brann's official supporters' club, Bataljonen, has selected the player of the year at the end of each season.

- 2000: (Norway) Roy Wassberg
- 2001: (Norway) Raymond Kvisvik
- 2002: (Norway) Tommy Knarvik
- 2003: (Norway) Raymond Kvisvik
- 2004: (Norway) Ragnvald Soma
- 2005: (Austria) Paul Scharner
- 2006: (Norway) Håkon Opdal
- 2007: (Norway) Thorstein Helstad
- 2008: (Iceland) Ólafur Örn Bjarnason
- 2009: (Norway) Erik Huseklepp
- 2010: (Norway) Petter Vaagan Moen
- 2011: (Jamaica) Rodolph Austin
- 2012: (Poland) Piotr Leciejewski
- 2013: (Poland) Piotr Leciejewski
- 2014: (Senegal) Stéphane Badji
- 2015: (Norway) Vadim Demidov
- 2016: (Norway) Vadim Demidov
- 2017: (Netherlands) Vito Wormgoor
- 2018: (Norway) Fredrik Haugen
- 2019: (Norway) Håkon Opdal
- 2020: (Norway) Ole Martin Kolskogen
- 2021: (Norway) Ruben Kristiansen
- 2022: (Norway) Mathias Rasmussen
- 2023: (Norway) Bård Finne
- 2024: (Norway) Felix Horn Myhre
- 2025: (Denmark) Emil Kornvig
