= 1989 Molde FK season =

Molde
1989 season
- Chairman: Nils Olav Kringstad
- Head coaches: Åge Hareide; Harry Hestad
- Stadium: Molde Stadion
- 1. divisjon: 4th
- Norwegian Cup: Runners-up
- Top goalscorer: League: Jostein Flo (12); All: Petter Belsvik (19); Jostein Flo (19)
- Highest home attendance: 5,380 vs Tromsø (9 July 1989)
- Average home league attendance: 3,457

The 1989 season was Molde's 15th season in the top flight of Norwegian football. This season Molde competed in 1. divisjon (first tier) and the Norwegian Cup.

In the league, Molde finished in 4th position, 15 points behind winners Lillestrøm.

Molde participated in the 1989 Norwegian Cup. They reached their second final in club history. Molde drew Viking 2–2 after extra time in the final played on 22 October at Ullevaal Stadion. Øystein Neerland and Petter Belsvik scored Molde's goals. The replay was played the following Sunday, on 29 October. Molde lost the replay 1–2 against Viking, Geir Sperre scored Molde's only goal of the game.

== Squad ==
Source: Note: Flags indicate national team as defined under FIFA eligibility rules; some limited exceptions apply. Players may hold more than one non-FIFA nationality.

| No. | Pos. | Nation | Player |
|---|---|---|---|
| — | GK | (Norway) NOR | Stig Engen |
| — | GK | (Norway) NOR | Thor André Olsen |
| — | DF | (Norway) NOR | Knut Hallvard Eikrem |
| — | DF | (Norway) NOR | Tor Gunnar Hagbø |
| — | DF | (Norway) NOR | Hugo Hansen |
| — | DF | (Norway) NOR | Ulrich Møller (Captain) |
| — | DF | (Norway) NOR | Sindre Rekdal |
| — | DF | (Norway) NOR | Geir Sperre |
| — | DF | (Norway) NOR | Ole Erik Stavrum |
| — | MF | (Norway) NOR | Torbjørn Evensen |

| No. | Pos. | Nation | Player |
|---|---|---|---|
| — | MF | (Norway) NOR | Stein Olav Hestad |
| — | MF | (Norway) NOR | Morten Kristiansen |
| — | MF | (Norway) NOR | Øyvind Leonhardsen |
| — | MF | (Norway) NOR | Espen Søraa |
| — | MF | (Norway) NOR | Ronald Wenaas |
| — | FW | (Norway) NOR | Petter Belsvik |
| — | FW | (Norway) NOR | Jostein Flo |
| — | FW | (Norway) NOR | Øystein Neerland |
| — | FW | (Norway) NOR | Frode Tømmerbakk |

== Competitions ==
=== 1. divisjon ===
==== Results summary ====
| Overall | | | | | | | | Home | | | | | | Away | | | | | |
| Pld | W | D | L | GF | GA | GD | Pts | W | D | L | GF | GA | GD | W | D | L | GF | GA | GD |
|---|---|---|---|---|---|---|---|---|---|---|---|---|---|---|---|---|---|---|---|
| 22 | 11 | 4 | 7 | 40 | 32 | +8 | 37 | 8 | 0 | 3 | 29 | 16 | +13 | 3 | 4 | 4 | 11 | 16 | −5 |

Source: nifs.no

==== Positions by round ====
| Round | 1 | 2 | 3 | 4 | 5 | 6 | 7 | 8 | 9 | 10 | 11 | 12 | 13 | 14 | 15 | 16 | 17 | 18 | 19 | 20 | 21 | 22 |
|---|---|---|---|---|---|---|---|---|---|---|---|---|---|---|---|---|---|---|---|---|---|---|
| Ground | A | H | A | H | A | H | A | H | A | A | H | H | A | H | A | H | A | H | A | H | H | A |
| Result | L | W | L | W | L | W | D | W | W | W | W | L | D | L | D | W | L | L | W | W | W | D |
| Position | 8 | 5 | 8 | 7 | 8 | 7 | 7 | 5 | 4 | 3 | 2 | 4 | 4 | 5 | 4 | 4 | 4 | 5 | 5 | 4 | 4 | 4 |

Source: see below

==== Results ====
| 30 April 1989 1 | Kongsvinger | 1 – 0 | Molde | Kongsvinger |
| CET (UTC+1) | Martinsen 16' | Report | | Stadium: Gjemselund Stadion; Attendance: 2,878; Referee: Tore Hollung |

| 6 May 1989 2 | Molde | 3 – 1 | Rosenborg | Molde |
| CET (UTC+1) | Stavrum 8' (pen.); Flo 10'; Neerland 44' | Report | Brandhaug 26' | Stadium: Molde Stadion; Attendance: 4,853; Referee: Christian Raabe |

| 15 May 1989 3 | Lillestrøm | 3 – 1 | Molde | Lillestrøm |
| CET (UTC+1) | Dyrstad 5'; Gulbrandsen 19'; Fjørtoft 46' | Report | Stavrum 60' | Stadium: Åråsen Stadion; Attendance: 6,387; Referee: Kaare Lindboe |

| 25 May 1989 4 | Molde | 2 – 1 | Start | Molde |
| CET (UTC+1) | Flo 15'; Leonhardsen 88' | Report | Isaksen 26' | Stadium: Molde Stadion; Attendance: 2,850; Referee: Roy Helge Olsen |

| 28 May 1989 5 | Viking | 2 – 0 | Molde | Stavanger |
| CET (UTC+1) | Tveit 6'; Malmedal 62' | Report | | Stadium: Stavanger Stadion; Attendance: 4,230; Referee: Kjell Nordby |

| 4 June 1989 6 | Molde | 2 – 1 | Brann | Molde |
| CET (UTC+1) | Flo 3'; Belsvik 55' | Report | Kruse 36' | Stadium: Molde Stadion; Attendance: 3,280; Referee: Rune Pedersen |

| 11 June 1989 7 | Moss | 1 – 1 | Molde | Moss |
| CET (UTC+1) | Stavrum 35' (o.g.) | Report | Belsvik 5' | Stadium: Melløs Stadion; Attendance: 2,682; Referee: Egil Nervik |

| 18 June 1989 8 | Molde | 5 – 0 | Vålerengen | Molde |
| CET (UTC+1) | Belsvik 26' (pen.), 65', 90'; Leonhardsen 64'; Neerland 85' | Report | | Stadium: Molde Stadion; Attendance: 3,380; Referee: Thorodd Presberg |

| 25 June 1989 9 | Sogndal | 1 – 2 | Molde | Sogndalsfjøra |
| CET (UTC+1) | Hopen 75' | Report | Kristiansen 45'; Neerland 76' | Stadium: Fosshaugane; Attendance: 1,347; Referee: Roy Helge Olsen |

| 2 July 1989 10 | Mjølner | 0 – 1 | Molde | Narvik |
| CET (UTC+1) | | Report | Neerland 55' | Stadium: Narvik Stadion; Attendance: 2,526; Referee: Thorodd Presberg |

| 9 July 1989 11 | Molde | 3 – 1 | Tromsø | Molde |
| CET (UTC+1) | Flo 8', 75'; Sperre 52' | Report | Pedersen 46' (pen.) | Stadium: Molde Stadion; Attendance: 5,380; Referee: Rune Pedersen |

| 23 July 1989 12 | Molde | 1 – 4 | Kongsvinger | Molde |
| CET (UTC+1) | Belsvik 59' (pen.) | Report | Dalløkken 8'; Berstad 14'; Riisnæs 59'; Sagen 74' | Stadium: Molde Stadion; Attendance: 4,180; Referee: Kjell Nordby |

| 30 July 1989 13 | Rosenborg | 1 – 1 | Molde | Trondheim |
| CET (UTC+1) | Jakobsen 73' | Report | Belsvik 84' | Stadium: Lerkendal Stadion; Attendance: 15,230; Referee: Rune Pedersen |

| 6 August 1989 14 | Molde | 0 – 3 | Lillestrøm | Molde |
| CET (UTC+1) | | Report | Dyrstad 20'; Gulbrandsen 83'; Larsen 90' | Stadium: Molde Stadion; Attendance: 5,182; Referee: Tore Hollung |

| 13 August 1989 15 | Start | 2 – 2 | Molde | Kristiansand |
| CET (UTC+1) | Mykland 22'; Strandli 53' | Report | Flo 44'; Leonhardsen 84' | Stadium: Kristiansand Stadion; Attendance: 4,678; Referee: Sven Kjelbrott |

| 20 August 1989 16 | Molde | 2 – 0 | Viking | Molde |
| CET (UTC+1) | Leonhardsen 79'; Wenaas 88' | Report | | Stadium: Molde Stadion; Attendance: 3,422; Referee: Erling Haugen |

| 27 August 1989 17 | Brann | 4 – 1 | Molde | Bergen |
| CET (UTC+1) | Torvanger 5' (pen.); Þórðarson 22', 79'; Nybø 52' | Report | Flo 10' | Stadium: Brann Stadion; Attendance: 8,742; Referee: Terje Singsaas |

| 30 August 1989 18 | Molde | 0 – 3 | Moss | Molde |
| CET (UTC+1) | | Report | Haldorsen 64'; Haugen 74'; Karlsrud 77' | Stadium: Molde Stadion; Attendance: 2,030; Referee: Sven Kjelbrott |

| 10 September 1989 19 | Vålerengen | 1 – 2 | Molde | Oslo |
| CET (UTC+1) | Unknown 62' | Report | Kristiansen 60'; Belsvik 80' (pen.) | Stadium: Bislett Stadion; Attendance: 2,355; Referee: Egil Nervik |

| 24 September 1989 20 | Molde | 4 – 2 | Sogndal | Molde |
| CET (UTC+1) | Belsvik 49'; Sperre 75'; Wenaas 78'; Flo 90' | Report | Førde 47'; Nilsen 50' | Stadium: Molde Stadion; Attendance: 2,015; Referee: Bjørn Kronborg |

| 1 October 1989 21 | Molde | 7 – 0 | Mjølner | Molde |
| CET (UTC+1) | Flo 39', 43', 44', 66' (pen.); Kristiansen 68'; Leonhardsen 73'; Hansen 84' | Report | | Stadium: Molde Stadion; Attendance: 1,455; Referee: Roy Helge Olsen |

| 8 October 1989 22 | Tromsø | 0 – 0 | Molde | Tromsø |
| CET (UTC+1) | | Report | | Stadium: Alfheim Stadion; Attendance: 5,002; Referee: Thorodd Presberg |

==== League table ====
| Pos | Team | Pld | W | D | L | GF | GA | GD | Pts | Qualification or relegation |
|---|---|---|---|---|---|---|---|---|---|---|
| 2 | Rosenborg | 22 | 13 | 5 | 4 | 56 | 29 | +27 | 44 | Qualification for the UEFA Cup first round |
| 3 | Tromsø | 22 | 11 | 4 | 7 | 36 | 25 | +11 | 37 | |
| 4 | Molde | 22 | 11 | 4 | 7 | 40 | 32 | +8 | 37 | |
| 5 | Kongsvinger | 22 | 10 | 4 | 8 | 34 | 25 | +9 | 34 | |
| 6 | Viking | 22 | 9 | 4 | 9 | 36 | 33 | +3 | 31 | Qualification for the Cup Winners' Cup first round |

Source: nifs.no

=== Norwegian Cup ===
| 7 June 1989 First round | Åndalsnes | 2 – 4 | Molde | Åndalsnes |
| CEST (UTC+2) | Dahle; Unknown | Report | Flo; Belsvik ?' (pen.), ?'; Kristiansen | Stadium: Øran Stadion |

| 21 June 1989 Second round | Molde | 11 – 0 | Bergsøy | Molde |
| CEST (UTC+2) | Belsvik 5', 56', 64', 88'; Flo 15', 17', 31'; Leonhardsen 30'; Neerland 47', 84'; Sperre 86' | Report | | Stadium: Molde Stadion; Attendance: 699 |

| 5 July 1989 Third round | Hødd | 1 – 2 | Molde | Ulsteinvik |
| CEST (UTC+2) | Hasund 47' | Report | Sperre 27'; Leonhardsen 85' | Stadium: Høddvoll Stadion; Attendance: 1,800 |

| 26 July 1989 Fourth round | Molde | 0 – 0 | Frigg | Molde |
| CEST (UTC+2) | | Report | | Stadium: Molde Stadion; Attendance: 2,182; Referee: Thorbjørn Aass |

| 2 August 1989 Fourth round Replay | Frigg | 2 – 3 | Molde | Oslo |
| CEST (UTC+2) | Raddum 21'; Bendiksen 55' | Report | Evensen 17'; Flo 43'; Belsvik 86' | Stadium: Bislett Stadion; Attendance: 3,002; Referee: Per Arne Larsgård |

| 16 August 1989 Quarter-finals | Sogndal | 4 – 5 | Molde | Sogndalsfjøra |
| CEST (UTC+2) | Christiansen 9'; Hopen 48'; Hillestad 65'; Nilsen 74' | Report | Kristiansen 1'; Flo 17', 56'; Belsvik 53', 63' | Stadium: Fosshaugane; Attendance: 2,020; Referee: Aril Haugstad |

| 17 September 1989 Semi-finals | Molde | 1 – 0 | Eik | Molde |
| CEST (UTC+2) | Bjørnsgård 6' (o.g.) | Report | | Stadium: Molde Stadion; Attendance: 9,036; Referee: Kaare Lindboe |

==== Final ====
22 October 1989
13:15 CEST (UTC+2)
Final

| Viking | 2 – 2 (a.e.t.) | Molde |
|---|---|---|
| Tveit 23'; Holmberg 61' | Report | Neerland 71'; Belsvik 90' |

Ullevaal Stadion, Oslo
Attendance: 23,000
Referee: Rune Pedersen (Sprint-Jeløy)

29 October 1989
13:15 CEST (UTC+2)
Final
Replay

| Viking | 2 – 1 | Molde |
|---|---|---|
| Fjetland 15'; Tveit 47' | Report | Sperre 38' |

Ullevaal Stadion, Oslo
Attendance: 9,856
Referee: Egil Nervik (Freidig)

== Squad statistics ==
=== Appearances and goals ===
Lacking information:

- Appearance statistics from Norwegian Cup rounds 1, 4, quarter-finals and semi-finals (7–9 players in first round, 11–13 players in fourth round, 8–10 players in the quarter-finals and 9–11 players in the semi-finals) are missing.

| No. | Pos | Nat | Player | Total | | 1. divisjon | | Norwegian Cup | |
| No. | Pos | Nat | Player | Apps | Goals | Apps | Goals | Apps | Goals |
|---|---|---|---|---|---|---|---|---|---|
| | FW | (Norway) NOR | Petter Belsvik | 29 | 19 | 21+1 | 9 | 7 | 10 |
| | DF | (Norway) NOR | Knut Hallvard Eikrem | 24 | 0 | 19 | 0 | 5 | 0 |
| | GK | (Norway) NOR | Stig Engen | 2 | 0 | 0+1 | 0 | 0+1 | 0 |
| | MF | (Norway) NOR | Torbjørn Evensen | 11 | 1 | 5+3 | 0 | 2+1 | 1 |
| | FW | (Norway) NOR | Jostein Flo | 28 | 19 | 21 | 12 | 7 | 7 |
| | DF | (Norway) NOR | Tor Gunnar Hagbø | 2 | 0 | 2 | 0 | 0 | 0 |
| | DF | (Norway) NOR | Hugo Hansen | 27 | 1 | 22 | 1 | 5 | 0 |
| | MF | (Norway) NOR | Stein Olav Hestad | 12 | 0 | 2+7 | 0 | 0+3 | 0 |
| | MF | (Norway) NOR | Morten Kristiansen | 27 | 5 | 19+2 | 3 | 6 | 2 |
| | MF | (Norway) NOR | Øyvind Leonhardsen | 27 | 7 | 22 | 5 | 5 | 2 |
| | DF | (Norway) NOR | Ulrich Møller | 27 | 0 | 21 | 0 | 6 | 0 |
| | FW | (Norway) NOR | Øystein Neerland | 20 | 7 | 10+6 | 4 | 1+3 | 3 |
| | GK | (Norway) NOR | Thor André Olsen | 29 | 0 | 22 | 0 | 7 | 0 |
| | DF | (Norway) NOR | Sindre Rekdal | 15 | 0 | 11+1 | 0 | 3 | 0 |
| | DF | (Norway) NOR | Geir Sperre | 25 | 5 | 19+1 | 2 | 5 | 3 |
| | DF | (Norway) NOR | Ole Erik Stavrum | 20 | 2 | 17 | 2 | 3 | 0 |
| | MF | (Norway) NOR | Espen Søraa | 4 | 0 | 1+3 | 0 | 0 | 0 |
| | FW | (Norway) NOR | Frode Tømmerbakk | 3 | 0 | 1+2 | 0 | 0 | 0 |
| | MF | (Norway) NOR | Ronald Wenaas | 15 | 2 | 5+8 | 2 | 2 | 0 |

=== Goalscorers ===
| Rank | Position | Nat. | Player | 1. divisjon | Norwegian Cup | Total |
|---|---|---|---|---|---|---|
| 1 | FW | (Norway) | Jostein Flo | 12 | 7 | 19 |
| 1 | FW | (Norway) | Petter Belsvik | 9 | 10 | 19 |
| 3 | MF | (Norway) | Øyvind Leonhardsen | 5 | 2 | 7 |
| 3 | FW | (Norway) | Øystein Neerland | 4 | 3 | 7 |
| 5 | MF | (Norway) | Morten Kristiansen | 3 | 2 | 5 |
| 5 | DF | (Norway) | Geir Sperre | 2 | 3 | 5 |
| 7 | DF | (Norway) | Ole Erik Stavrum | 2 | 0 | 2 |
| 7 | MF | (Norway) | Ronald Wenaas | 2 | 0 | 2 |
| 9 | DF | (Norway) | Hugo Hansen | 1 | 0 | 1 |
| 9 | MF | (Norway) | Torbjørn Evensen | 0 | 1 | 1 |
| | | | Own goals | 0 | 1 | 1 |
| | | | TOTALS | 40 | 29 | 69 |

== See also ==
- Molde FK seasons
