= 1989 Norwegian Football Cup final =

- Event: 1989 Norwegian Football Cup
Viking	Molde
Viking	Molde
2	2
- After extra time
- Date: 22 October 1989
- Venue: Ullevaal Stadion, Oslo
- Referee: Rune Pedersen
- Attendance: 23,000

Replay
Viking	Molde
2	1
- Date: 29 October 1989
- Venue: Ullevaal Stadion, Oslo
- Referee: Egil Nervik
- Attendance: 9,856

The 1989 Norwegian Football Cup final was the 84th final of the Norwegian Football Cup. The final took place at Ullevaal Stadion in Oslo on 22 October 1989. Viking were in their 8th final (3 wins and 4 runners-up), while Molde were in their second final after losing the 1982 final against Brann and therefore had the chance to win the first trophy in the club's history.

The first final between the two teams ended with a 2–2 draw. A replay was played on the following Sunday on 29 October and ended with a 2–1 win for Viking who became Norwegian Champions for the fourth time.

== Route to the final ==
Viking		Round	Molde	
Klepp (D3); A 3–2	Jonevret 35', 83', Own goal 75'	First Round	Åndalsnes (D3); A 4–2	
Ulf-Sandnes (D3); A 8–1	Holmberg 19', 22', Soltvedt 59', Gjerde 66', 84', Malmedal 71', 88, Jonevret 75'	Second Round	Bergsøy (D3); A 11–0	Belsvik 5', 56', 64', 88', Flo 15', 17', 31', Leonhardsen 30', Neerland 47', 84', Sperre 86'
Vidar (D2); A 4–2 (aet)	Jonevret 23', 25', Malmedal 108', Tveit 111'	Third Round	Hødd (D3); A 2–1	Sperre 27', Leonhardsen 85'
Harstad (D2); H 2–1 (aet)	Jonevret 41', 120'	Fourth Round	Frigg (D2); H 0–0 (aet), 3–2	Evensen 16', Flo 43' Belsvik 86'
Faaberg (D2); A 3–2	Gjerde 13', Christiansen 34', Malmedal 69'	Quarterfinal	Sogndal (D1); A 5–4	Kristiansen 1', Flo 17', 55', Belsvik 50', 60'
HamKam (D2); H 3–1	Fjetland 27', Soltvedt 37', Holmberg 60'	Semifinal	Eik (D2); H 1–0	Bjørnsgård (o.g.) 6'

- (D1) = 1. divisjon team
- (D2) = 2. divisjon team
- (D3) = 3. divisjon team

== Matches ==
=== First match details ===
22 October 1989
13:15 CET (UTC+1)

Molde	2–2 (a.e.t.)	Viking
Neerland 71'; Belsvik 90'	Report	Tveit 23'; Holmberg 61'

Ullevaal Stadion, Oslo
Attendance: 23,000
Referee: Rune Pedersen (Sprint-Jeløy)

Molde	Viking

Molde:
GK	1	(Norway) Thor André Olsen
SW	4	(Norway) Ulrich Møller (c)
RB	2	(Norway) Hugo Hansen
CB		(Norway) Knut Hallvard Eikrem	(substituted off) 64'
CB		(Norway) Ole Erik Stavrum
LB	6	(Norway) Geir Sperre
CM	7	(Norway) Øyvind Leonhardsen
CM	8	(Norway) Morten Kristiansen
CM	9	(Norway) Ronald Wenaas
CF		(Norway) Jostein Flo	(substituted off) 88'
CF		(Norway) Petter Belsvik
Substitutions:
FW	14	(Norway) Øystein Neerland	(substituted in) 64'
MF		(Norway) Stein Olav Hestad	(substituted in) 88'
Head Coach:
(Norway) Åge Hareide

Viking:
GK	1	(Norway) Lars Gaute Bø
RB		(Norway) Kent Christiansen
CB		(Norway) Ingve Bøe
CB	5	(Norway) Roger Nilsen
LB	11	(Norway) Svein Fjælberg
RM		(Norway) Egil Fjetland	(substituted off) 82'
CM	7	(Norway) Trond Egil Soltvedt
CM		(Sweden) Per Holmberg	(substituted off) 74'
LM		(Sweden) Kjell Jonevret
CF	9	(Norway) Alf Kåre Tveit
CF		(Norway) Jan Fjetland
Substitutions:
MF		(Norway) Rune Gjerde	(substituted in) 82'
MF		(Norway) Endre Tangen	(substituted in) 74'
Head Coach:
(Sweden) Benny Lennartsson

=== Replay match details ===
29 October 1989
13:15 CET (UTC+1)

Viking	2–1	Molde
Fjetland 15'; Tveit 47'	Report	Sperre 38'

Ullevaal Stadion, Oslo
Attendance: 9,856
Referee: Egil Nervik (Freidig)

Viking:
GK	1	(Norway) Lars Gaute Bø
RB		(Norway) Kent Christiansen
CB		(Norway) Ingve Bøe
CB	5	(Norway) Roger Nilsen
LB	11	(Norway) Svein Fjælberg
RM		(Norway) Egil Fjetland	(substituted off) 52'
CM	7	(Norway) Trond Egil Soltvedt
CM		(Sweden) Per Holmberg
LM		(Sweden) Kjell Jonevret
CF	9	(Norway) Alf Kåre Tveit	(substituted off) 84'
CF		(Norway) Jan Fjetland
Substitutions:
MF		(Norway) Rune Gjerde	(substituted in) 84'
MF		(Norway) Geir Malmedal	(substituted in) 52'
Head Coach:
(Sweden) Benny Lennartsson

Molde:
GK	1	(Norway) Thor André Olsen
RB	2	(Norway) Hugo Hansen
CB		(Norway) Knut Hallvard Eikrem	(substituted off) 60'
CB	4	(Norway) Ulrich Møller (c)
CB		(Norway) Ole Erik Stavrum
LB	6	(Norway) Geir Sperre
CM	7	(Norway) Øyvind Leonhardsen
CM	8	(Norway) Morten Kristiansen
CM	9	(Norway) Ronald Wenaas
CF		(Norway) Jostein Flo
CF		(Norway) Petter Belsvik
Substitutions:
MF		(Norway) Stein Olav Hestad	(substituted in) 60'
Head Coach:
(Norway) Åge Hareide

== See also ==
- 1989 Norwegian Football Cup
- 1989 1. divisjon
- 1989 2. divisjon
- 1989 in Norwegian football
