= 1990 Molde FK season =

Molde
1990 season
- Chairman: Bernt Roald
- Head coach: Åge Hareide
- Stadium: Molde Stadion
- Tippeligaen: 3rd
- Norwegian Cup: Fourth Round vs. Kongsvinger
- Top goalscorer: League: Petter Belsvik (12); All: Petter Belsvik (14)
- Highest home attendance: 4,308 vs Viking (4 June 1990)
- Lowest home attendance: 913 vs Åndalsnes (1 July 1990)
- Average home league attendance: 3,369

The 1990 season was Molde's 16th season in the top flight of Norwegian football. This season Molde competed in Tippeligaen and the Norwegian Cup.

In Tippeligaen, Molde finished in 3rd position, four points behind winners Rosenborg.

Molde participated in the 1990 Norwegian Cup. They reached the fourth round where they were knocked out by Kongsvinger after losing 1–0 at away ground.

== Squad ==
Source: Note: Flags indicate national team as defined under FIFA eligibility rules; some limited exceptions apply. Players may hold more than one non-FIFA nationality.

No.	Pos.	Nation	Player
—	GK	(Norway) NOR	Erik Magnus Ring
—	GK	(Norway) NOR	Thor André Olsen
—	DF	(Norway) NOR	Tore Brogstad
—	DF	(Norway) NOR	Knut Hallvard Eikrem
—	DF	(Norway) NOR	Kjell Rune Flo
—	DF	(Norway) NOR	Tor Gunnar Hagbø
—	DF	(Norway) NOR	Ulrich Møller (Captain)
—	DF	(Norway) NOR	Sindre Rekdal
—	DF	(Norway) NOR	Geir Sperre
—	DF	(Norway) NOR	Ole Erik Stavrum
—	DF	(Norway) NOR	Trond Strande

No.	Pos.	Nation	Player
—	MF	(Norway) NOR	Morten Kristiansen
—	MF	(Norway) NOR	Jan Erlend Kruse
—	MF	(Norway) NOR	Øyvind Leonhardsen
—	MF	(Norway) NOR	Bjørn Nilsen
—	MF	(Norway) NOR	Espen Søraa
—	MF	(Norway) NOR	Ronald Wenaas
—	FW	(Norway) NOR	Petter Belsvik
—	FW	(Norway) NOR	Jostein Flo
—	FW	(Norway) NOR	Øystein Neerland
—	FW	(Norway) NOR	Frode Tømmerbakk

== Friendlies ==
17 February 1990	Molde	1 – 0	Viking	Sauda
CET (UTC+1)	Goal	Report	Goal

18 February 1990	Molde	2 – 5	Rosenborg	Sauda
CET (UTC+1)	Goal	Report	Goal

3 March 1990	Molde	5 – 1	Kristiansund	Molde
CET (UTC+1)	Goal	Report	Goal	Stadium: Lubbenes kunstgress

3 March 1990	Brage (Sweden)	2 – 2	(Norway) Molde
CET (UTC+1)	Goal	Report	Goal

11 March 1990	Finland	1 – 1	(Norway) Molde
CET (UTC+1)	Goal	Report	Goal

14 March 1990	Molde (Norway)	2 – 1	(Denmark) Ikast
CET (UTC+1)	Goal	Report	Goal

21 March 1990	Molde	1 – 0	Aalesund	Molde
CET (UTC+1)	Goal	Report		Stadium: Lubbenes kunstgress

25 March 1990	Molde	9 – 0	Åndalsnes	Molde
CET (UTC+1)	Goal	Report		Stadium: Lubbenes kunstgress

28 March 1990	Molde	4 – 3	Volda	Molde
CET (UTC+1)	Goal	Report	Goal	Stadium: Reknesbanen

5 April 1990	Sunndal	0 – 2	Molde	Sunndalsøra
CET (UTC+1)		Report	Goal

9 April 1990	Molde	2 – 0	Stjørdals-Blink	Trondheim
CET (UTC+1)	Goal	Report

10 April 1990	Rosenborg	0 – 0	Molde	Trondheim
CET (UTC+1)		Report

16 April 1990	HamKam	1 – 0	Molde	Hamar
CET (UTC+1)	Goal	Report

18 April 1990	Molde	1 – 1	Hødd	Rekdal, Vestnes Municipality
CET (UTC+1)	Goal	Report	Goal

22 April 1990	Aalesund	1 – 6	Molde	Ålesund
CET (UTC+1)	Goal	Report	Goal

== Competitions ==
=== Tippeligaen ===
==== Results summary ====
Overall								Home						Away					
Pld	W	D	L	GF	GA	GD	Pts	W	D	L	GF	GA	GD	W	D	L	GF	GA	GD
22	12	4	6	34	29	+5	40	7	1	3	22	18	+4	5	3	3	12	11	+1

Source: nifs.no

==== Positions by round ====
Round	1	2	3	4	5	6	7	8	9	10	11	12	13	14	15	16	17	18	19	20	21	22
Ground	A	H	H	A	H	A	H	A	H	A	H	H	A	A	H	A	H	A	H	A	H	A
Result	W	D	W	L	W	D	W	W	L	W	W	W	W	L	L	D	W	L	L	W	W	D
Position	3	4	1	5	2	3	2	2	2	2	2	1	1	2	2	3	2	3	4	4	4	3

Source: see below

==== Results ====
29 April 1990 1	VIF Fotball	0 – 1	Molde	Oslo
CET (UTC+1)		Report	K. Flo 52'	Stadium: Bislett Stadion; Attendance: 2,385; Referee: Kjell Nordby

6 May 1990 2	Molde	1 – 1	Moss	Molde
CET (UTC+1)	Kruse 58'	Report	Pedersen 20'	Stadium: Molde Stadion; Attendance: 3,804; Referee: Roy Helge Olsen

13 May 1990 3	Molde	1 – 0	Start	Molde
CET (UTC+1)	J. Flo 50'	Report		Stadium: Molde Stadion; Attendance: 3,128; Referee: Jan Erik Olsen

16 May 1990 4	Viking	2 – 0	Molde	Stavanger
CET (UTC+1)	Fjetland 30'; Gjerde 90+1'	Report		Stadium: Stavanger Stadion; Attendance: 10,298; Referee: Per-Arne Larsgård

20 May 1990 5	Molde	1 – 0	Tromsø	Molde
CET (UTC+1)	Belsvik 67'	Report		Stadium: Molde Stadion; Attendance: 3,918; Referee: Christian Raabe

27 May 1990 6	Brann	0 – 0	Molde	Bergen
CET (UTC+1)		Report		Stadium: Brann Stadion; Attendance: 6,738; Referee: Arild Haugstad

4 June 1990 7	Molde	3 – 2	Lillestrøm	Molde
CET (UTC+1)	Kruse 5'; Belsvik 8'; J. Flo 17'	Report	Rasimus 35'; Arnevåg 88'	Stadium: Molde Stadion; Attendance: 4,308; Referee: Rune Pedersen

10 June 1990 8	Rosenborg	0 – 1	Molde	Trondheim
CET (UTC+1)		Report	Stavrum 4'	Stadium: Lerkendal Stadion; Attendance: 10,724

17 June 1990 9	Molde	0 – 2	Strømsgodset	Molde
CET (UTC+1)		Report	Storskogen 6'; Nordeide 23'	Stadium: Molde Stadion; Attendance: 2,940; Referee: Arild Haugstad

24 June 1990 10	Kongsvinger	1 – 3	Molde	Kongsvinger
CET (UTC+1)	Martinsen 62'	Report	Belsvik 17'; Kruse 34'; Stavrum 57'	Stadium: Gjemselund Stadion; Attendance: 1,380; Referee: Egil Nervik

15 July 1990 11	Molde	2 – 0	Fyllingen	Molde
CET (UTC+1)	Belsvik 70'; Leonhardsen 84'	Report		Stadium: Molde Stadion; Attendance: 3,228; Referee: Svein G. Hermansen

22 July 1990 12	Molde	4 – 1	VIF Fotball	Molde
CET (UTC+1)	K. Flo 44'; Neerland 53'; Kruse 54'; Nilsen 88'	Report	E. Johansen 45'	Stadium: Molde Stadion; Attendance: 2,480; Referee: Tore Hollung

29 July 1990 13	Moss	0 – 1	Molde	Moss
CET (UTC+1)		Report	Belsvik 28'	Stadium: Melløs Stadion; Attendance: 2,272; Referee: Arild Thorp

5 August 1990 14	Start	2 – 0	Molde	Kristiansand
CET (UTC+1)	Håberg 1', 71'	Report		Stadium: Kristiansand Stadion; Attendance: 4,412; Referee: Terje Hauge

12 August 1990 15	Molde	2 – 3	Viking	Molde
CET (UTC+1)	Neerland 21'; Belsvik 27'	Report	Storvik 8'; Tveit 23'; Jonevret 84'	Stadium: Molde Stadion; Attendance: 3,677; Referee: Lars Kåre Rogne

19 August 1990 16	Tromsø	0 – 0	Molde	Tromsø
CET (UTC+1)		Report		Stadium: Alfheim Stadion; Attendance: 5,836; Referee: Egil Nervik

26 August 1990 17	Molde	6 – 2	Brann	Molde
CET (UTC+1)	Belsvik 9', 15'; Neerland 19'; Kruse 65'; Nilsen 84'; Wenaas 89'	Report	Mjelde 57'; Roth 75'	Stadium: Molde Stadion; Attendance: 3,819; Referee: Terje Singsaas

2 September 1990 18	Lillestrøm	3 – 1	Molde	Lillestrøm
CET (UTC+1)	Arnevåg 10'; Gulbrandsen 20', 74'	Report	Belsvik 55'	Stadium: Åråsen Stadion; Attendance: 2,902; Referee: Arild Haugstad

8 September 1990 19	Molde	1 – 7	Rosenborg	Molde
CET (UTC+1)	Leonhardsen 49'	Report	Jakobsen 16', 51'; Ø. Berg 69', 82'; Løken 77'; Sørloth 79'; Ingebrigtsen 90'	Stadium: Molde Stadion; Attendance: 3,560; Referee: Christian Raabe

23 September 1990 20	Strømsgodset	1 – 3	Molde	Drammen
CET (UTC+1)	Johnsen 62'	Report	Belsvik 35'; Neerland 79'; K. Flo 90'	Stadium: Marienlyst Stadion; Attendance: 3,900; Referee: Tore Hollung

30 September 1990 21	Molde	1 – 0	Kongsvinger	Molde
CET (UTC+1)	Neerland 11'	Report		Stadium: Molde Stadion; Attendance: 2,197; Referee: Kjell Nordby

7 October 1990 22	Fyllingen	2 – 2	Molde	Bergen
CET (UTC+1)	Lyngvær 87'; P. Ludvigsen 89'	Report	Belsvik 85', 90+1'	Stadium: Varden Amfi; Attendance: 1,593; Referee: Hans Georg Svendsen

==== League table ====
Pos	Team	Pld	W	D	L	GF	GA	GD	Pts	Qualification or relegation
1	Rosenborg (C)	22	13	5	4	60	24	+36	44	Qualification for the European Cup first round
2	Tromsø	22	12	6	4	36	21	+15	42	Qualification for the UEFA Cup first round
3	Molde	22	12	4	6	34	29	+5	40	
4	Brann	22	11	6	5	34	25	+9	39	
5	Viking	22	10	5	7	41	30	+11	35	

Source: fotball.no
(C) Champions

=== Norwegian Cup ===
24 May 1990 First round	Molde	3 – 0	Sunndal	Molde
CEST (UTC+2)	Belsvik 37'; J. Flo 41'; Nilsen 73'	Report		Stadium: Molde Stadion; Attendance: 1,037; Referee: Tor Sunde

30 May 1990 Second round	Clausenengen	0 – 3	Molde	Kristiansund
CEST (UTC+2)		Report	Wenaas 14' (pen.); Kristiansen 62'; Stavrum 84' (pen.)	Stadium: Atlanten Stadion; Attendance: 400; Referee: Einar Hellevik

1 July 1990 Third round	Molde	6 – 2	Åndalsnes	Molde
CEST (UTC+2)	Leonhardsen 7', 11', 15', 17'; K. Flo 25'; Belsvik 71'	Report	Kristiansen 48'; Mjelva 60'	Stadium: Molde Stadion; Attendance: 913; Referee: Torbjørn Aas

25 July 1990 Fourth round	Kongsvinger	1 – 0	Molde	Sander
CEST (UTC+2)	Riisnæs 54'	Report		Stadium: Sandermoen Stadion; Attendance: 1,165; Referee: Bjørn Kronborg

== Squad statistics ==
=== Appearances and goals ===
Lacking information:

- Appearance statistics from Norwegian Cup rounds 1–4 (4–6 players in first round, 5–7 players in second round, 8–10 players in third round and 7–9 players in fourth round) are missing.

No.	Pos	Nat	Player	Total		Tippeligaen		Norwegian Cup	
No.	Pos	Nat	Player	Apps	Goals	Apps	Goals	Apps	Goals
	FW	(Norway) NOR	Petter Belsvik	24	14	21+1	12	2	2
	DF	(Norway) NOR	Tore Brogstad	19	0	16+2	0	0+1	0
	DF	(Norway) NOR	Knut Hallvard Eikrem	9	0	5+4	0	0	0
	FW	(Norway) NOR	Jostein Flo	12	3	10	2	2	1
	DF	(Norway) NOR	Kjell Rune Flo	17	4	15	3	2	1
	DF	(Norway) NOR	Tor Gunnar Hagbø	5	0	0+5	0	0	0
	MF	(Norway) NOR	Morten Kristiansen	22	1	19+1	0	2	1
	MF	(Norway) NOR	Jan Erlend Kruse	20	4	19	4	1	0
	MF	(Norway) NOR	Øyvind Leonhardsen	23	6	21	2	2	4
	DF	(Norway) NOR	Ulrich Møller	21	0	21	0	0	0
	FW	(Norway) NOR	Øystein Neerland	15	5	13+2	5	0	0
	FW	(Norway) NOR	Bjørn Nilsen	16	3	10+5	2	1	1
	GK	(Norway) NOR	Thor André Olsen	23	0	22	0	1	0
	DF	(Norway) NOR	Sindre Rekdal	3	0	3	0	0	0
	DF	(Norway) NOR	Geir Sperre	22	1	20	1	2	0
	DF	(Norway) NOR	Ole Erik Stavrum	19	3	18	2	1	1
	FW	(Norway) NOR	Frode Tømmerbakk	6	0	0+6	0	0	0
	MF	(Norway) NOR	Ronald Wenaas	24	2	8+14	1	1+1	1

=== Goalscorers ===
Rank	Position	Nat.	Player	Tippeligaen	Norwegian Cup	Total
1	FW	(Norway)	Petter Belsvik	12	2	14
2	MF	(Norway)	Øyvind Leonhardsen	2	4	6
3	FW	(Norway)	Øystein Neerland	5	0	5
4	MF	(Norway)	Jan Erlend Kruse	4	0	4
4	DF	(Norway)	Kjell Rune Flo	3	1	4
6	FW	(Norway)	Jostein Flo	2	1	3
6	FW	(Norway)	Bjørn Nilsen	2	1	3
6	DF	(Norway)	Ole Erik Stavrum	2	1	3
9	MF	(Norway)	Ronald Wenaas	1	1	2
10	DF	(Norway)	Geir Sperre	1	0	1
10	MF	(Norway)	Morten Kristiansen	0	1	1
			TOTALS	34	12	46

== See also ==
- Molde FK seasons
