= 1988 Molde FK season =

Molde
1988 season
- Chairman: Nils Olav Kringstad
- Head coaches: Åge Hareide; Harry Hestad
- Stadium: Molde Stadion
- 1. divisjon: 3rd
- Norwegian Cup: Quarter-final vs. Rosenborg
- UEFA Cup: First round vs. Waregem
- Top goalscorer: League: Jostein Flo (10); Kjetil Rekdal (10); All: Jostein Flo (14); Kjetil Rekdal (14)
- Highest home attendance: 6,520 vs Rosenborg (21 August 1988)
- Lowest home attendance: 542 vs Spjelkavik (10 June 1988)
- Average home league attendance: 3,473

The 1988 season was Molde's 14th season in the top flight of Norwegian football. This season Molde competed in 1. divisjon (first tier), the Norwegian Cup and the 1988–89 UEFA Cup.

In the league, Molde finished in 3rd position, 8 points behind winners Rosenborg.

Molde participated in the 1988 Norwegian Cup. They reached the quarter-finals where they drew rivals Rosenborg. Molde lost the game at Molde Stadion 1–2 after extra time and were eliminated from the competition.

== Squad ==
Source: Note: Flags indicate national team as defined under FIFA eligibility rules; some limited exceptions apply. Players may hold more than one non-FIFA nationality.

No.	Pos.	Nation	Player
—	GK	(Norway) NOR	Stig Engen
—	GK	(Norway) NOR	Thor André Olsen
—	DF	(Norway) NOR	Knut Hallvard Eikrem
—	DF	(Norway) NOR	Tor Gunnar Hagbø
—	DF	(Norway) NOR	Ulrich Møller (Captain)
—	DF	(Norway) NOR	Sindre Rekdal
—	DF	(Norway) NOR	Geir Sperre
—	DF	(Norway) NOR	Ole Erik Stavrum
—	DF	(Norway) NOR	André Sylte
—	MF	(Norway) NOR	Jan Berg

No.	Pos.	Nation	Player
—	MF	(Norway) NOR	Torbjørn Evensen
—	MF	(Norway) NOR	Stein Olav Hestad
—	MF	(Norway) NOR	Kjetil Rekdal
—	MF	(Norway) NOR	Finn Renna
—	MF	(Norway) NOR	Ronald Wenaas
—	FW	(Norway) NOR	Jostein Flo
—	FW	(Norway) NOR	Kjell Petter Hoel
—	FW	(Norway) NOR	Øystein Neerland
—	FW	(Norway) NOR	Rune Sunde

== Friendlies ==
13 February 1988	Molde	1 – 1	Volda	Molde
CET (UTC+1)	Goal	Report	Goal	Stadium: Lubbenes kunstgress

20 February 1988	Molde	3 – 0	Sunndal	Molde
CET (UTC+1)	Goal	Report		Stadium: Lubbenes kunstgress

27 February 1988	Molde	5 – 1	Hødd	Molde
CET (UTC+1)	Goal	Report	Goal	Stadium: Lubbenes kunstgress

6 March 1988	Molde	4 – 0	Tromsø	Molde
CET (UTC+1)	Goal	Report		Stadium: Lubbenes kunstgress
Note: Nissan Cup

12 March 1988	Rosenborg	2 – 0	Molde	Lade, Trondheim
CET (UTC+1)	Goal	Report
Note: Nissan Cup

19 March 1988	Molde	3 – 0	Sogndal	Molde
CET (UTC+1)	Goal	Report		Stadium: Lubbenes kunstgress
Note: Nissan Cup

26 March 1988	Molde	4 – 0	Alvdal	Eresfjord
CET (UTC+1)	Goal	Report

30 March 1988	Molde	3 – 1	Skarbøvik	Rekdal, Vestnes Municipality
CET (UTC+1)	Goal	Report	Goal

9 April 1988	Kristiansund	1 – 2	Molde	Kristiansund
CET (UTC+1)	Goal	Report	Goal

12 April 1988	Vejle (Denmark)	1 – 2	(Norway) Molde	Vejle, Denmark
CET (UTC+1)	Goal	Report	Goal

14 April 1988	Molde	1 – 1	Bodø/Glimt	Vildbjerg, Denmark
CET (UTC+1)	Goal	Report	Goal

15 April 1988	Molde	1 – 1	Vålerengen	Denmark
CET (UTC+1)	Goal	Report	Goal

23 April 1988	Aalesund	2 – 5	Molde	Ålesund
CET (UTC+1)	Goal	Report	Goal

== Competitions ==
=== 1. divisjon ===
==== Results summary ====
Overall								Home						Away					
Pld	W	D	L	GF	GA	GD	Pts	W	D	L	GF	GA	GD	W	D	L	GF	GA	GD
22	10	9	3	35	18	+17	39	5	5	1	22	11	+11	5	4	2	13	7	+6

Source: nifs.no

==== Positions by round ====
Round	1	2	3	4	5	6	7	8	9	10	11	12	13	14	15	16	17	18	19	20	21	22
Ground	A	H	H	A	A	H	A	H	A	H	A	H	A	H	A	H	A	H	A	H	A	H
Result	D	D	D	W	L	W	L	D	D	D	D	W	D	W	W	L	W	D	W	W	W	W
Position	7	8	8	5	8	5	7	7	7	7	7	7	7	7	7	7	6	6	5	4	4	3

Source: see below

==== Results ====
30 April 1988 1	Bryne	0 – 0	Molde	Bryne
CET (UTC+1)		Report		Stadium: Bryne Stadion; Attendance: 3,218; Referee: Kjell Nordby

8 May 1988 2	Molde	1 – 1	Sogndal	Molde
CET (UTC+1)	Flo 21'	Report	Hopen 29'	Stadium: Molde Stadion; Attendance: 4,620; Referee: Rune Pedersen

12 May 1988 3	Molde	0 – 0	Lillestrøm	Molde
CET (UTC+1)		Report		Stadium: Molde Stadion; Attendance: 4,620; Referee: Bjørn Kronborg

15 May 1988 4	Brann	1 – 4	Molde	Bergen
CET (UTC+1)	Storskogen 85'	Report	Neerland 1'; Flo 26', 72'; Rekdal 78'	Stadium: Brann Stadion; Attendance: 13,567; Referee: Thorodd Presberg

23 May 1988 5	Rosenborg	4 – 2	Molde	Trondheim
CET (UTC+1)	Ingebrigtsen 18'; Sollied 52'; Jakobsen 65'; Brandhaug 84'	Report	Neerland 39', 62'	Stadium: Lerkendal Stadion; Attendance: 14,449; Referee: Jan Erik Olsen

29 May 1988 6	Molde	1 – 0	Djerv 1919	Molde
CET (UTC+1)	Sunde 68'	Report		Stadium: Molde Stadion; Attendance: 3,520; Referee: Roy Helge Olsen

5 June 1988 7	Tromsø	1 – 0	Molde	Tromsø
CET (UTC+1)	Hadler-Olsen 6'	Report		Stadium: Alfheim Stadion; Attendance: 6,011; Referee: Tore Hollung

19 June 1988 8	Molde	1 – 1	Moss	Molde
CET (UTC+1)	Rekdal 5'	Report	Fjærestad 36'	Stadium: Molde Stadion; Attendance: 3,280; Referee: Arild Haugstad

26 June 1988 9	Strømmen	0 – 0	Molde	Strømmen
CET (UTC+1)		Report		Stadium: Strømmen Stadion; Attendance: 1,003; Referee: Roy Helge Olsen

3 July 1988 10	Molde	2 – 2	Vålerengen	Molde
CET (UTC+1)	Rekdal 3'; Flo 63'	Report	Arnesen 75'; Arnevåg 86'	Stadium: Molde Stadion; Attendance: 1,829

10 July 1988 11	Kongsvinger	0 – 0	Molde	Kongsvinger
CET (UTC+1)		Report		Stadium: Gjemselund Stadion; Attendance: 1,601; Referee: Jan Erik Olsen

24 July 1988 12	Molde	6 – 2	Bryne	Molde
CET (UTC+1)	Flo 9', 24'; Wenaas 11'; Rekdal 17', 74', 89'	Report	Hansen 48'; Undheim 84'	Stadium: Molde Stadion; Attendance: 2,750; Referee: Tore Hollung

31 July 1988 13	Sogndal	1 – 1	Molde	Sogndalsfjøra
CET (UTC+1)	Opseth 60'	Report	Stavrum ?'	Stadium: Fosshaugane; Attendance: 2,275

7 August 1988 14	Molde	2 – 0	Brann	Molde
CET (UTC+1)	Evensen 2'; Stavrum 62'	Report		Stadium: Molde Stadion; Attendance: 4,080

14 August 1988 15	Lillestrøm	0 – 1	Molde	Lillestrøm
CET (UTC+1)		Report	Neerland 72'	Stadium: Åråsen Stadion; Attendance: 4,164; Referee: Kjell Nordby

21 August 1988 16	Molde	2 – 4	Rosenborg	Molde
CET (UTC+1)	Rekdal 20'; Flo 51'	Report	Berg 31'; Brandhaug 46'; Kultorp 49'; Jakobsen 66'	Stadium: Molde Stadion; Attendance: 6,520

28 August 1988 17	Djerv 1919	0 – 1	Molde	Haugesund
CET (UTC+1)		Report	Flo 51'	Stadium: Haugesund Stadion; Attendance: 2,475

4 September 1988 18	Molde	0 – 0	Tromsø	Molde
CET (UTC+1)		Report		Stadium: Molde Stadion; Attendance: 3,320; Referee: Tore Hollung

11 September 1988 19	Moss	0 – 2	Molde	Moss
CET (UTC+1)		Report	Flo 39'; Wenaas 82'	Stadium: Melløs Stadion; Attendance: 2,465; Referee: Egil Nervik

25 September 1988 20	Molde	3 – 0	Strømmen	Molde
CET (UTC+1)	Stavrum 20', 77'; Rekdal 80'	Report		Stadium: Molde Stadion; Attendance: 1,422

2 October 1988 21	Vålerengen	0 – 2	Molde	Oslo
CET (UTC+1)		Report	Rekdal ?', 75'	Stadium: Bislett Stadion; Attendance: 1,001

9 October 1988 22	Molde	4 – 1	Kongsvinger	Molde
CET (UTC+1)	Flo 22'; Neerland 29', 67'; Berg 80'	Report	Martinsen 16'	Stadium: Molde Stadion; Attendance: 2,250

==== League table ====
Pos	Team	Pld	W	D	L	GF	GA	GD	Pts	Qualification or relegation
1	Rosenborg (C)	22	14	5	3	54	23	+31	47	Qualification for the European Cup first round
2	Lillestrøm	22	11	7	4	38	18	+20	40	Qualification for the UEFA Cup first round
3	Molde	22	10	9	3	35	18	+17	39	
4	Moss	22	11	4	7	30	19	+11	37	
5	Tromsø	22	9	6	7	27	22	+5	33	

Source: nifs.no
(C) Champions

=== Norwegian Cup ===
18 May 1988 First round	Surnadal	0 – 4	Molde	Surnadal
CEST (UTC+2)		Report	Flo 1st half', 2nd half' Berg 1st half' K. Rekdal 2nd half'	Stadium: Syltøran Stadion; Attendance: 500

10 June 1988 Second round	Molde	2 – 0	Spjelkavik	Molde
CEST (UTC+2)	Flo 11', 26'	Report		Stadium: Molde Stadion; Attendance: 542

6 July 1988 Third round	Clausenengen	0 – 0 (a.e.t.) (3–4 p)	Molde	Kristiansund
CEST (UTC+2)		Report
	Penalties
			(penalty scored) K. Rekdal; (penalty scored) Wenaas; (penalty scored) Hagbø; (penalty scored) Sperre

3 August 1988 Fourth round	Alvdal	0 – 2	Molde	Alvdal
CEST (UTC+2)		Report	K. Rekdal 54', 74'	Stadium: Steinmoegga Idrettspark; Attendance: 3,550; Referee: Thorbjørn Aass

24 August 1988 Quarter-finals	Molde	1 – 2 (a.e.t.)	Rosenborg	Molde
CEST (UTC+2)	Neerland 70'	Report	Henriksen 89'; K. Rekdal 119' (o.g.)	Stadium: Molde Stadion; Attendance: 10,240; Referee: Rune Pedersen

== Squad statistics ==
=== Appearances and goals ===
Lacking information:

- Appearance statistics (8–10 players) and goalscorer from Norwegian Cup quarter-finals are missing.

No.	Pos	Nat	Player	Total		1. divisjon		Norwegian Cup		UEFA Cup	
No.	Pos	Nat	Player	Apps	Goals	Apps	Goals	Apps	Goals	Apps	Goals
	MF	(Norway) NOR	Jan Berg	27	2	22	1	3	1	2	0
	DF	(Norway) NOR	Knut Hallvard Eikrem	27	0	21	0	4	0	2	0
	GK	(Norway) NOR	Stig Engen	2	0	0+1	0	0+1	0	0	0
	MF	(Norway) NOR	Torbjørn Evensen	24	1	15+4	1	3	0	2	0
	FW	(Norway) NOR	Jostein Flo	28	14	22	10	4	4	2	0
		(Norway) NOR	Tor Gunnar Hagbø	16	0	12+1	0	3	0	0	0
	MF	(Norway) NOR	Stein Olav Hestad	23	0	11+7	0	3	0	1+1	0
		(Norway) NOR	Kjell Petter Hoel	2	0	0+1	0	0+1	0	0	0
	DF	(Norway) NOR	Ulrich Møller	29	0	22	0	5	0	2	0
	FW	(Norway) NOR	Øystein Neerland	26	6	15+5	6	4	0	2	0
	GK	(Norway) NOR	Thor André Olsen	28	0	22	0	4	0	2	0
	MF	(Norway) NOR	Kjetil Rekdal	28	14	21	10	5	3	2	1
	DF	(Norway) NOR	Sindre Rekdal	3	0	1+1	0	1	0	0	0
	MF	(Norway) NOR	Finn Renna	19	0	9+6	0	1+1	0	1+1	0
	DF	(Norway) NOR	Geir Sperre	22	0	17+1	0	2	0	2	0
	DF	(Norway) NOR	Ole Erik Stavrum	26	4	21	4	3	0	2	0
	FW	(Norway) NOR	Rune Sunde	5	1	2+2	1	1	0	0	0
		(Norway) NOR	André Sylte	1	0	1	0	0	0	0	0
	MF	(Norway) NOR	Ronald Wenaas	23	2	7+10	2	1+3	0	0+2	0

=== Goalscorers ===
Rank	Position	Nat.	Player	1. divisjon	Norwegian Cup	UEFA Cup	Total
1	FW	(Norway)	Jostein Flo	10	4	0	14
1	MF	(Norway)	Kjetil Rekdal	10	3	1	14
3	FW	(Norway)	Øystein Neerland	6	0	0	6
4	DF	(Norway)	Ole Erik Stavrum	4	0	0	4
5	MF	(Norway)	Ronald Wenaas	2	0	0	2
5	MF	(Norway)	Jan Berg	1	1	0	2
7	MF	(Norway)	Torbjørn Evensen	1	0	0	1
7	FW	(Norway)	Rune Sunde	1	0	0	1
			Unknown	0	1	0	1
			TOTALS	35	9	1	45

== See also ==
- Molde FK seasons
