= Ingve Bøe =

Norwegian footballer

Personal information
- Full name: Ingve Henrik Bøe
- Date of birth: 29 September 1964 (age 62)
- Position: Left back

Youth career
- Sunde
- Vidar

Senior career*
Years	Team	Apps	(Gls)
1984–1988	Vidar		
1989–1995	Viking	141	(13)
1996	Bryne		
1997–1999	Havørn		
2000	Randaberg		
2001–2002	Tasta		
2002	Sunde		
2003	Stavanger		
2004	Madla		

Managerial career
- 1997–1999: Havørn (player-manager)
- * Club domestic league appearances and goals

Ingve Bøe (born 29 September 1964) is a retired Norwegian football defender. Best known for his period in Viking, he became 1989 cup champion and 1991 league champion.

== Career ==
A youth player for Sunde IL, he was also a youth coach in the same club as a teenager. Bøe then joined FK Vidar. In 1984 he was selected for a Norway U20 training camp together with players such as Frode Grodås, Einar Rossbach, Rune Tangen, Jan Berg, Gunnar Halle, Sten Glenn Håberg, Vegard Skogheim and Arve Seland.

Ahead of the 1989 season he moved from Vidar to the larger team in the city, Viking FK. Bøe and Egil Fjetland was rumoured to cost 250,000 kr combined. In the 1989 Norwegian Football Cup, Bøe was happy that Viking was drawn against Vidar in the third round. Viking reached the cup final, with Bøe and Kent Christiansen being the most stable players in defence. This was inconceivable one year prior, according to musings in Rogalands Avis. Bøe was also called "find of the year".

When Viking won the 1989 Norwegian Football Cup final, Bøe was praised for pacifying opposing striker Petter Belsvik. Later Prime Minister Kjell Magne Bondevik accused Bøe of a handball in the penalty area, for which no penalty was awarded.

Following the cup victory, Viking joined the 1990–91 European Cup Winners' Cup. Bøe played in both legs against RFC Liège, against whom Viking experienced two resounding losses. In 1990, Bøe came second in the player of the year vote arranged by Rogalands Avis, behind Roger Nilsen. The same newspaper called Nilsen and Bøe "the Katzenjammer Kids", as they were the only outfield players to play Viking's first 20 league matches of 1990.

In the 1991 Eliteserien, Viking led the table from the first to the last round. After Viking incurred their first two losses in July, Bøe scored one of the goals against Lillestrøm which put Viking back on a winning streak. Incidentally, Viking secured the league title on 29 September, Bøe's 27th birthday.

The 1992 season became much more difficult for Viking, with the team fighting against relegation. Bøe was among the key players who was rumoured to leave for somewhere else. However, Viking managed to tighten up in the 1992–93 UEFA Champions League first round against Barcelona. Bøe played the first leg at left back as Viking only lost 1–0 away. He faced Michael Laudrup, and though Bøe at times had problems keeping up with the Dane, Laudrup eventually had to substitute off after a duel with Bøe. Bøe also played the entire return leg, this time at home, where Barcelona held Viking to 0–0 and progressed.

In his 100th league game for Viking in August 1993, Bøe was declared man of the match by VG and delivered the assist to the only goal in Viking's game against Molde. By that time, he was the only Viking player to actually come from Stavanger. Bøe was Viking's penalty taker, scoring twice in the 16th May game against Vålerengen in 1994 and being declared man of the match by local press. In the 1994 Eliteserien, Bøe ended up being Viking's top goalscorer ahead of future Premier League striker Egil Østenstad, having converted 7 penalties. Viking secured bronze medals in the league, qualifying for the 1995–96 UEFA Cup.

After the Norwegian 1994 season concluded, Bøe went on trial with Ethnikos Piraeus in Greece. The trial included another player Roy Wassberg and was facilitated by former Alpha Ethniki player Arne Møller. According to Rogalands Avis, this was the first transfer offer for Bøe during his time at Viking. Ethnikos sought a right back, but opted not to sign Bøe.

Viking's first outing in the 1995–96 UEFA Cup was an away match versus TPV. At 0–0, Ingve Bøe missed a penalty kick which he put in the post. Whereas UEFA reported that Bøe scored Viking's first goal in the 48th minute, this was reported as an own goal at the time. Viking progressed to the first round, where Ingve Bøe did not play as they were knocked out by Auxerre.

== Personal life ==
Ingve Bøe was nicknamed "Chips". While playing for Viking he was married and had two children.

== Later career ==
Bøe went on from Viking to Bryne in 1996. By June 1996, he was the top goalscorer of this club as well, with 4 goals, not exclusively from penalties.

Ahead of the 1997 season, Bøe wanted to prioritize his family and train more on his own during off-season. Bryne did not accept this, and Bøe ended his elite career. From 1997, Bøe moved successively to host of smaller clubs in the Stavanger Region; Havørn, Randaberg, Tasta, Sunde, Stavanger and Madla.

In 2022, Verdens Gang declared Ingve Bøe to be the 50th best Viking FK player of the last 50 years.
