= 1997 Molde FK season =

Molde
1997 season
- Chairman: Lars Erik Frisvold
- Head coach: Åge Hareide
- Stadium: Molde Stadion
- Tippeligaen: 4th
- Norwegian Cup: Second round vs. Stryn
- Top goalscorer: League: Odd Inge Olsen (13); All: Odd Inge Olsen (13)
- Highest home attendance: 8,100 vs Rosenborg (22 June 1997)
- Average home league attendance: 3,965

The 1997 season was Molde's 22nd season in the top flight of Norwegian football. This season Molde competed in Tippeligaen and the Norwegian Cup.

In Tippeligaen, Molde finished in 4th position, 16 points behind winners Rosenborg.

Molde participated in the 1998 Norwegian Cup. They were knocked out in the second round by Stryn with the score 0-1.

== Squad ==
Note: Flags indicate national team as defined under FIFA eligibility rules; some limited exceptions apply. Players may hold more than one non-FIFA nationality.

No.	Pos.	Nation	Player
1	GK	(Norway) NOR	Morten Bakke
2	DF	(Sweden) SWE	Dennis Schiller
3	DF	(Norway) NOR	Petter Christian Singsaas
4	MF	(Sweden) SWE	Henrik Berger
5	DF	(Norway) NOR	Knut Anders Fostervold (Captain)
6	MF	(Norway) NOR	Daniel Berg Hestad
7	MF	(Norway) NOR	Ronald Wenaas
9	MF	(Norway) NOR	Odd Inge Olsen
10	FW	(Norway) NOR	Andreas Lund
11	DF	(Norway) NOR	Trond Andersen
12	FW	(Norway) NOR	Geir Televik
13	GK	(Norway) NOR	Are Lervik

No.	Pos.	Nation	Player
14	DF	(Norway) NOR	Sindre Rekdal
15	MF	(Norway) NOR	Petter Rudi
16	MF	(Norway) NOR	Per Olav Sætre
17	DF	(Norway) NOR	Trond Strande
21	MF	(Norway) NOR	Stian Ohr
22	DF	(Norway) NOR	Ole Erik Stavrum
23	MF	(Norway) NOR	Anders Hasselgård
24	MF	(Norway) NOR	Thomas Mork
25	DF	(Norway) NOR	Pål Lydersen
26	DF	(Iceland) ISL	Bjarki Gunnlaugsson
27	MF	(Norway) NOR	Karl Oskar Fjørtoft

As of end of season.

== Friendlies ==
1996	Molde	1 – 2	Haugesund
CET (UTC+1)	Goal	Report	Goal

1996	Molde	2 – 2	Vålerenga
CET (UTC+1)	Goal	Report	Goal

1996	Molde (Norway)	2 – 2	(Italy) Monza	Italy
CET (UTC+1)	Goal	Report	Goal

1996	Molde (Norway)	3 – 1	(South Korea) Dragons	Italy
CET (UTC+1)	Goal	Report	Goal

1996	Molde (Norway)	1 – 4	(Italy) Sampdoria	Italy
CET (UTC+1)	Goal	Report	Goal

1996	Molde	2 – 1	Stabæk
CET (UTC+1)	Goal	Report	Goal

1996	Molde	0 – 4	Bodø/Glimt
CET (UTC+1)		Report	Goal

1996	Molde	4 – 0	Aalesund
CET (UTC+1)	Goal	Report

1996	Molde (Norway)	3 – 1	(Sweden) Örgryte	Cyprus
CET (UTC+1)	Goal	Report	Goal

1996	Molde (Norway)	0 – 0	Azerbaijan	Cyprus
CET (UTC+1)		Report

1996	Molde	1 – 0	Skeid
CET (UTC+1)	Goal	Report

1996	Molde	3 – 1	Hødd
CET (UTC+1)	Goal	Report	Goal

1996	Molde	1 – 0	Viking
CET (UTC+1)	Goal	Report

1996	Molde	1 – 1	Bryne
CET (UTC+1)	Goal	Report	Goal

1996	Molde	2 – 1	Lyn
CET (UTC+1)	Goal	Report	Goal

1996	Molde	1 – 5	Rosenborg
CET (UTC+1)	Goal	Report	Goal

1996	Molde	2 – 2	Stabæk
CET (UTC+1)	Goal	Report	Goal

== Competitions ==
=== Tippeligaen ===
==== Results summary ====
Overall								Home						Away					
Pld	W	D	L	GF	GA	GD	Pts	W	D	L	GF	GA	GD	W	D	L	GF	GA	GD
26	13	6	7	47	36	+11	45	7	3	3	20	14	+6	6	3	4	27	22	+5

Last updated: 2 May 2018.

==== Positions by round ====
Round	1	2	3	4	5	6	7	8	9	10	11	12	13	14	15	16	17	18	19	20	21	22	23	24	25	26
Ground	A	H	A	H	H	A	H	A	H	A	H	A	H	H	H	H	A	A	H	A	H	A	H	A	H	A
Result	L	L	W	D	L	D	W	W	W	W	W	W	L	W	W	D	W	W	D	D	L	D	W	L	W	L
Position	13	14	10	10	12	12	9	9	6	3	3	3	5	3	2	2	2	2	2	3	4	4	3	5	3	4

Source: see below

==== Results ====
20 April 1997 2	Strømsgodset	2 – 0	Molde	Drammen
18:00 CET (UTC+1)	Barannik 18'; Olsen 90'	Report		Stadium: Marienlyst Stadion; Attendance: 7,286; Referee: Sven Kjelbrott

25 April 1997 3	Skeid	0 – 3	Molde	Oslo
19:00 CET (UTC+1)		Report	Hestad 56', 77'; Olsen 79'	Stadium: Ullevaal Stadion; Attendance: 1,805; Referee: Tommy Skjerven

4 May 1997 4	Molde	0 – 0	Viking	Molde
18:00 CET (UTC+1)		Report		Stadium: Molde Stadion; Attendance: 3,319; Referee: Sven Kjelbrott

8 May 1997 5	Molde	0 – 2	Brann	Molde
18:00 CET (UTC+1)		Report	Pedersen 2'; Flo 4'	Stadium: Molde Stadion; Attendance: 5,887; Referee: Jon Eilif Skjervold

11 May 1997 6	Lillestrøm	1 – 1	Molde	Lillestrøm
18:00 CET (UTC+1)	Strandli 60'	Report	Hestad 9'	Stadium: Åråsen Stadion; Attendance: 3,487; Referee: Tore Hollung

16 May 1997 7	Molde	2 – 1	Tromsø	Molde
18:00 CET (UTC+1)	Olsen 42', 86'	Report	Hafstad 63'	Stadium: Molde Stadion; Attendance: 3,914; Referee: Sven Kjelbrott

19 May 1997 8	Kongsvinger	1 – 3	Molde	Kongsvinger
18:00 CET (UTC+1)	Erntsson 35'	Report	Olsen 11', 36'; Ohr 90'	Stadium: Gjemselund Stadion; Attendance: 3,462; Referee: Tommy Skjerven

25 May 1997 9	Molde	2 – 0	Sogndal	Molde
18:00 CET (UTC+1)	Hestad 43', 78'	Report		Stadium: Molde Stadion; Attendance: 3,660; Referee: Roy Helge Olsen

29 May 1997 1	Bodø/Glimt	4 – 0	Molde	Bodø
19:00 CET (UTC+1)	Johansen 9'; Ellingsen 61', 63'; Sørensen 64'	Report		Stadium: Aspmyra Stadion; Attendance: 3,420; Referee: Tore Hollung

1 June 1997 11	Molde	1 – 0	Haugesund	Molde
18:00 CET (UTC+1)	Wenaas 79'	Report		Stadium: Molde Stadion; Attendance: 3,094; Referee: Terje Hauge

15 June 1997 12	Stabæk	0 – 1	Molde	Bærum
18:00 CET (UTC+1)		Report	Fjørtoft 61'	Stadium: Nadderud Stadion; Attendance: 2,886; Referee: Terje Hauge

18 June 1997 10	Lyn	1 – 3	Molde	Oslo
19:00 CET (UTC+1)	T. Wæhler 42'	Report	Rekdal 26'; Fostervold 73'; Olsen 90'	Stadium: Ullevaal Stadion; Attendance: 1,290; Referee: Ivar A. Eriksen

22 June 1997 13	Molde	0 – 4	Rosenborg	Molde
18:00 CET (UTC+1)		Report	Jakobsen 19'; Brattbakk 77', 86'; Rushfeldt 80'	Stadium: Molde Stadion; Attendance: 8,100; Referee: Jon Eilif Skjervold

29 June 1997 14	Molde	2 – 1	Bodø/Glimt	Molde
18:00 CET (UTC+1)	Hestad 35'; Fostervold 65'	Report	Steinbakk 75'	Stadium: Molde Stadion; Attendance: 2,986; Referee: Frode Kvam

6 July 1997 15	Molde	2 – 0	Strømsgodset	Molde
18:00 CET (UTC+1)	Olsen 7'; Gunnlaugsson 84'	Report		Stadium: Molde Stadion; Attendance: 4,835; Referee: Arild Haugstad

13 July 1997 16	Molde	3 – 3	Skeid	Molde
18:00 CET (UTC+1)	Hestad 9', 54'; Rekdal 61'	Report	Berre 75' dos Santos 83'; Larsen 86'	Stadium: Molde Stadion; Attendance: 4,887; Referee: Tommy Skjerven

27 July 1997 17	Viking	2 – 3	Molde	Stavanger
18:00 CET (UTC+1)	Pereira 56'; Skogheim 74'	Report	Fjørtoft 28'; Hestad 37', 70'	Stadium: Stavanger Stadion; Attendance: 6,887; Referee: Frode Kvam

3 August 1997 18	Brann	0 – 4	Molde	Bergen
18:00 CET (UTC+1)		Report	Hestad 16'; Olsen 61', 66', 72'	Stadium: Brann Stadion; Attendance: 9,998; Referee: Rune Pedersen

9 August 1997 19	Molde	1 – 1	Lillestrøm	Molde
16:00 CET (UTC+1)	Olsen 28'	Report	Kristinsson 80'	Stadium: Molde Stadion; Attendance: 2,456; Referee: Tore Hollung

24 August 1997 20	Tromsø	4 – 4	Molde	Tromsø
18:00 CET (UTC+1)	Lange 55', 72'; Nilsen 87', 90+1'	Report	Fostervold 26'; Fjørtoft 48'; Olsen 61'; Rudi 65'	Stadium: Alfheim Stadion; Attendance: 2,958; Referee: Tom Henning Øvrebø

31 August 1997 21	Molde	0 – 1	Kongsvinger	Molde
18:00 CET (UTC+1)		Report	Sætre 61'	Stadium: Molde Stadion; Attendance: 3,236; Referee: Tommy Skjerven

14 September 1997 22	Sogndal	3 – 3	Molde	Sogndalsfjøra
15:00 CET (UTC+1)	Andreassen 42'; Karlsbakk 54'; Johansen 68'	Report	Singsaas 31'; Fostervold 41', 80'	Stadium: Fosshaugane; Attendance: 1,410; Referee: Jon Eilif Skjervold

21 September 1997 23	Molde	3 – 0	Lyn	Molde
15:00 CET (UTC+1)	Gunnlaugsson 17'; Olsen 58'; Lund 89'	Report		Stadium: Molde Stadion; Attendance: 2,005; Referee: Harald Hansen

5 October 1997 24	Haugesund	2 – 1	Molde	Haugesund
13:00 CET (UTC+1)	Grindhaug 61'; Johansson 66'	Report	Hestad 25'	Stadium: Haugesund Stadion; Attendance: 3,336; Referee: Roy Helge Olsen

11 October 1997 25	Molde	4 – 1	Stabæk	Molde
16:00 CET (UTC+1)	Lund 10'; Gunnlaugsson 41', 48'; Rekdal 51'	Report	Sigurðsson 30'	Stadium: Molde Stadion; Attendance: 3,182; Referee: Jon Eilif Skjervold

19 October 1997 26	Rosenborg	2 – 1	Molde	Trondheim
13:00 CET (UTC+1)	Rushfeldt 20'; Skammelsrud 78'	Report	Fostervold 4'	Stadium: Lerkendal Stadion; Attendance: 11,583; Referee: Tore Hollung

==== League table ====
Pos	Team	Pld	W	D	L	GF	GA	GD	Pts	Qualification or relegation
2	Brann	26	15	5	6	59	37	+22	50	Qualification for the UEFA Cup second qualifying round
3	Strømsgodset	26	14	4	8	58	44	+14	46	Qualification for the UEFA Cup second qualifying round
4	Molde	26	13	6	7	47	36	+11	45	Qualification for the UEFA Cup second qualifying round
5	Stabæk	26	13	4	9	33	35	−2	43	Qualification for the Intertoto Cup first round
6	Kongsvinger	26	11	5	10	43	48	−5	38	Qualification for the Intertoto Cup first round

Source: fotball.no
Rules for classification: 1) points; 2) goal difference; 3) number of goals scored.

Vålerenga Fotball qualified for the Cup Winners' Cup as Norwegian Cup winners from a lower division.

=== Norwegian Cup ===
22 May 1997 First round	Kristiansund	0 – 3	Molde	Kristiansund
CEST (UTC+2)		Report	Rekdal 60' (pen.), 71' (pen.); Pedersen 89'	Stadium: Gressbanen; Attendance: 742; Referee: Øivind Kringstad

11 June 1997 Second round	Stryn	1 – 0	Molde	Stryn
CEST (UTC+2)	Tenden 70'	Report		Stadium: Stryn stadion Attendance: 700; Referee: Tommy Skjerven

== Squad statistics ==
=== Appearances and goals ===
No.	Pos	Nat	Player	Total		Tippeligaen		Norwegian Cup	
No.	Pos	Nat	Player	Apps	Goals	Apps	Goals	Apps	Goals
1	GK	(Norway) NOR	Morten Bakke	27	0	26	0	1	0
2	DF	(Sweden) SWE	Dennis Schiller	18	0	15+3	0	0	0
3	DF	(Norway) NOR	Petter Christian Singsaas	21	1	19+1	1	1	0
5	DF	(Norway) NOR	Knut Anders Fostervold	25	6	23	6	2	0
6	MF	(Norway) NOR	Daniel Berg Hestad	26	12	25	12	1	0
7	MF	(Norway) NOR	Ronald Wenaas	14	1	5+7	1	0+2	0
9	MF	(Norway) NOR	Odd Inge Olsen	28	13	26	13	2	0
10	FW	(Norway) NOR	Andreas Lund	4	2	1+3	2	0	0
11	DF	(Norway) NOR	Trond Andersen	27	0	25	0	2	0
12	FW	(Norway) NOR	Geir Televik	14	0	8+4	0	2	0
13	GK	(Norway) NOR	Are Lervik	1	0	0	0	1	0
14	DF	(Norway) NOR	Sindre Rekdal	18	5	14+3	3	0+1	2
15	MF	(Norway) NOR	Petter Rudi	11	1	11	1	0	0
16	MF	(Norway) NOR	Per Olav Sætre	5	0	0+4	0	1	0
17	DF	(Norway) NOR	Trond Strande	25	0	17+6	0	2	0
21	MF	(Norway) NOR	Stian Ohr	12	1	0+10	1	1+1	0
22	DF	(Norway) NOR	Ole Erik Stavrum	20	0	14+5	0	1	0
23	MF	(Norway) NOR	Anders Hasselgård	6	0	2+4	0	0	0
24	MF	(Norway) NOR	Thomas Mork	5	0	0+4	0	1	0
25	DF	(Norway) NOR	Pål Lydersen	23	0	21	0	2	0
26	DF	(Iceland) ISL	Bjarki Gunnlaugsson	10	4	7+3	4	0	0
27	MF	(Norway) NOR	Karl Oskar Fjørtoft	25	3	23	3	2	0
Players away from Molde on loan:
Players who left Molde during the season:
8	DF	(Norway) NOR	Kjetil Ruthford Pedersen	2	1	0+1	0	0+1	1
20	MF	(Scotland) SCO	Lee Robertson	4	0	2+2	0	0	0

=== Goalscorers ===
Rank	Position	Nat.	No.	Player	Tippeligaen	Norwegian Cup	Total
1	MF	(Norway)	10	Odd Inge Olsen	13	0	13
2	MF	(Norway)	6	Daniel Berg Hestad	12	0	12
3	DF	(Norway)	5	Knut Anders Fostervold	6	0	6
4	DF	(Norway)		Sindre Rekdal	3	2	5
5	DF	(Iceland)		Bjarki Gunnlaugsson	4	0	4
6	MF	(Norway)	8	Karl Oskar Fjørtoft	3	0	3
7	FW	(Norway)	9	Andreas Lund	2	0	2
8	MF	(Norway)		Stian Ohr	1	0	1
8	MF	(Norway)		Petter Rudi	1	0	1
8	DF	(Norway)		Petter Christian Singsaas	1	0	1
8	MF	(Norway)		Ronald Wenaas	1	0	1
8	DF	(Norway)		Kjetil Ruthford Pedersen	0	1	1
				TOTALS	47	3	50

== See also ==
- Molde FK seasons
