= Thomas Myhre =

Norwegian footballer (born 1973)

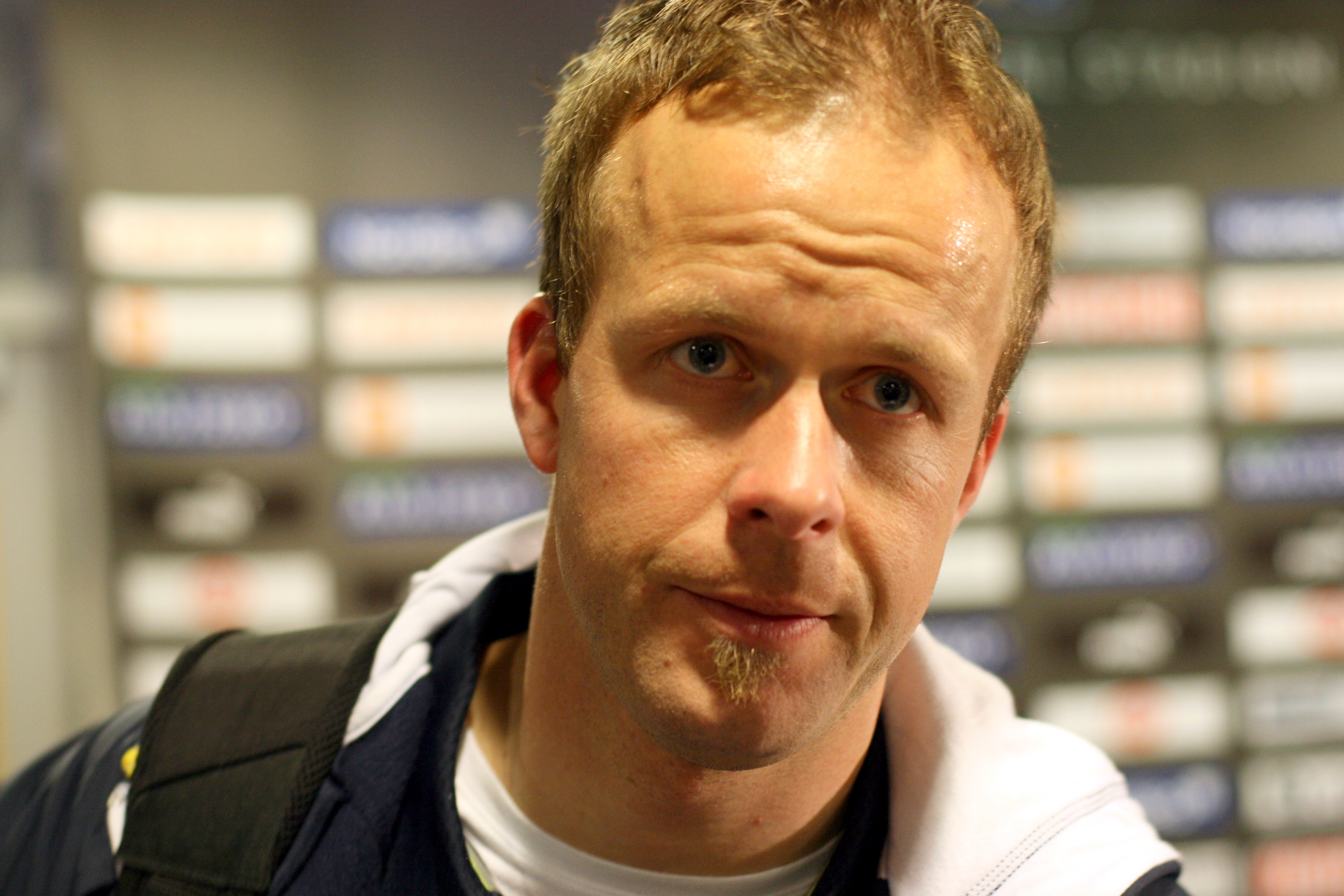
- Myhre in 2009

Personal information
- Full name: Thomas Harald Myhre
- Date of birth: 16 October 1973 (age 53)
- Place of birth: Sarpsborg, Norway
- Height: 1.92 m (6 ft 4 in)
- Position: Goalkeeper

Team information
- Current team: HamKam (manager)

Youth career
- Moss

Senior career*
Years	Team	Apps	(Gls)
–1992	Moss		
1993–1997	Viking	94	(0)
1997–2001	Everton	70	(0)
1999	→ Rangers (loan)	3	(0)
2000	→ Birmingham City (loan)	7	(0)
2000	→ Tranmere Rovers (loan)	3	(0)
2001	→ FC Copenhagen (loan)	14	(0)
2001–2002	Beşiktaş	13	(0)
2002–2005	Sunderland	37	(0)
2003–2004	→ Crystal Palace (loan)	15	(0)
2005	Fredrikstad	3	(0)
2005–2007	Charlton Athletic	21	(0)
2007–2010	Viking	46	(0)
2010–2011	Kongsvinger	20	(0)
Total		346	(0)

International career
1989	Norway U15	8	(0)
1990	Norway U16	5	(0)
1991	Norway U17	7	(0)
1992	Norway U18	5	(0)
1993	Norway U20	4	(0)
1992–1995	Norway U21	27	(0)
1998–2007	Norway	56	(0)

Managerial career
- 2020–2021: Moss (sports director)
- 2021–2025: Moss
- 2025–: HamKam
- * Club domestic league appearances and goals

Thomas Harald Myhre (born 16 October 1973) is a Norwegian football manager and former professional player who played as a goalkeeper. He is the manager of HamKam. The last club he played for before his retirement was Kongsvinger, having returned to Norwegian football in July 2007. Myhre earned 56 caps for the Norwegian national team, and was a part of the Norwegian squad at the 1998 FIFA World Cup and 2000 European Championship tournaments.

== Club career ==
=== Early career ===
Myhre was born in Sarpsborg, Østfold. He started his career with Moss F.K. in the Norwegian First Division, but arrived at Viking in the Premier League in 1993. The 19-year-old replaced Lars Gaute Bø, who retired at the end of the 1992 season, and immediately established himself as the first-choice goalkeeper, playing in every match that season. Myhre was also the number one goalkeeper for the Norway national under-21 team, for whom he reached 27 caps. After missing the entire 1996 season through injury, Myhre returned to form in 1997. He was noticed by English club Everton, who bought him for £800,000 in November 1997.

=== Move abroad ===
Myhre instantly established himself as Everton's first choice goalkeeper at the expense of an aging Neville Southall. On 22 April 1998, he made his debut for the Norway national team, keeping a clean sheet in the 2–0 victory over Denmark in Copenhagen. Myhre was subsequently selected to represent Norway at the 1998 FIFA World Cup, where he was an unused substitute for Frode Grodås.

Following an ankle injury, he was replaced by Paul Gerrard as Everton's starting goalkeeper in the summer of 1999 and failed to reclaim his place. Acting as stand-in for Paul Gerrard in the FA-Cup tie against Aston Villa on 20 February 2000, Myhre was at fault for Villa's opening goal. Everton were knocked out of the FA-Cup and Myhre's days at the club were practically numbered.

=== 1997–2001: loans ===
In the next two years he played for four different teams. He was first loaned out on an emergency basis to Rangers in Scotland in November 1999. In 2000, he was loaned from Everton to Birmingham City to ensure an additional fee would not be incurred for reaching a set number of appearances for Everton. He started well for Birmingham, saving a penalty kick from Keith Curle against Wolverhampton Wanderers on his debut. He played well for Birmingham, and returned to the national team in the spring of 2000, to play at the Euro 2000.

After Euro 2000, Everton loaned him out to Tranmere Rovers, as well as Danish club FC Copenhagen with whom he won the Danish superliga. In November 2001, Myhre permanently left Everton, as he was sold to Turkish club Beşiktaş for £375,000. After one season at Beşiktaş, he moved back to England to play for Sunderland in July 2002. At Sunderland, Myhre was second choice goalkeeper behind Thomas Sørensen, and was loaned out to Crystal Palace in October 2003. His stay at Sunderland was plagued by injuries, and he played only one of the Euro 2004 qualifiers for Norway. However, he returned as first-choice goalkeeper in Sunderland after the departure of Sørensen, playing 31 league games in the 2004–05 season, as the club won promotion to the Premier League. He also returned to the national team, playing 11 of the 12 qualifiers for the 2006 FIFA World Cup.

However, Myhre's contract with Sunderland ran out in June 2005, and he chose not to prolong it. On 21 July 2005, he moved back to Norway and joined Fredrikstad F.K. on a free transfer, where he played on a match-by-match basis. He played three matches for Fredrikstad, including an emotional encounter with his former club Viking, before English club Charlton Athletic signed him on a two-year deal on 8 August 2005 following an injury to their goalkeeper Dean Kiely. Initially second choice goalkeeper behind Stephan Andersen, Myhre established himself as Charlton's starting goalkeeper in December 2005. Through the rest of the season, Myhre kept 10 clean sheets, and he played more than ten hours without conceding a home goal at The Valley. However, following the departure of manager Alan Curbishley, he once again found himself second choice goalkeeper at the start of the 2006–07 season, this time in favour of the loaned-in Scott Carson.

=== Return to Viking ===
In 2007, he moved back to former club Viking. He did not play as much as he would have wanted with a back injury keeping him out most of 2008. He started the 2009 pre-season well, and played most of the season for the Stavanger-team. His contract with Viking allegedly ended after a late night out in February 2010. Myhre later claimed that Viking was only looking to get rid of him, using it as an excuse. Later revelations are that he was drugged in Marbella.

=== Kongsvinger ===
On 5 March 2010, Myhre signed for Kongsvinger. On 11 March 2011, Myhre announced that he would retire from the game.

== International career ==
Myhre was selected to represent Norway at the 1998 FIFA World Cup, where he was an unused substitute for Frode Grodås.

At the 2000 European Championship (Euro 2000) in June, he played all three games for Norway. Myhre kept clean sheets against Spain and Slovenia, and conceded only one goal in the tournament – Savo Milošević's winner in the match against Yugoslavia.

In a Euro 2008 qualifier against Turkey on 28 March 2007, Norway were leading 2–0 at half time. In the second half, Myhre could not hold a free kick from Hamit Altıntop, and fumbled the ball into his own net. Minutes before full-time, another Altıntop shot went straight through Myhre's legs, and the game ended 2–2. Although his Norwegian teammates were consoling him, Myhre proclaimed the match his "worst day on the field". The game against Turkey was Myhre's last game for Norway.

== Managerial career ==
=== Moss ===
In December 2020, he was appointed as sports director for his boyhood club, Moss. In September 2021, Myhre was appointed manager of Moss. In the 2022 season, Myhre led Moss to promotion and was awarded Manager of the Year.

=== HamKam ===
After over four years at Moss, Myhre left the club to become the new head coach for HamKam after Jakob Michelsen had announced he would leave the club.

== Career statistics ==
=== International ===
Appearances and goals by national team and year
National team	Year	Apps	Goals
Norway	1998	2	0
Norway	1999	4	0
Norway	2000	7	0
Norway	2001	10	0
Norway	2002	6	0
Norway	2003	0	0
Norway	2004	9	0
Norway	2005	9	0
Norway	2006	7	0
Norway	2007	2	0
Total		56	0

== Coaching statistics ==
As of match played 21 November 2026

Team	From	To	Record					Ref.
Team	From	To	P	W	D	L	Win %	Ref.
Moss	27 September 2021	25 June 2025	118	60	17	41	50.85	
HamKam	25 June 2025	present	52	19	12	21	36.54	
Total			170	79	29	62	46.47	—

== Honours ==
=== As a player ===
Sunderland

- Football League Championship: 2004–05

=== As a manager ===
Individual

- Norwegian First Division Coach of the Month: May 2024
- Eliteserien Coach of the Month: October 2025
