= 1989 Norwegian Football Cup =

Norgesmesterskapet i fotball for herrer

Tournament details
- Country: Norway
- Teams: 128 (main competition)

Final positions
- Champions: Viking (4th title)
- Runners-up: Molde

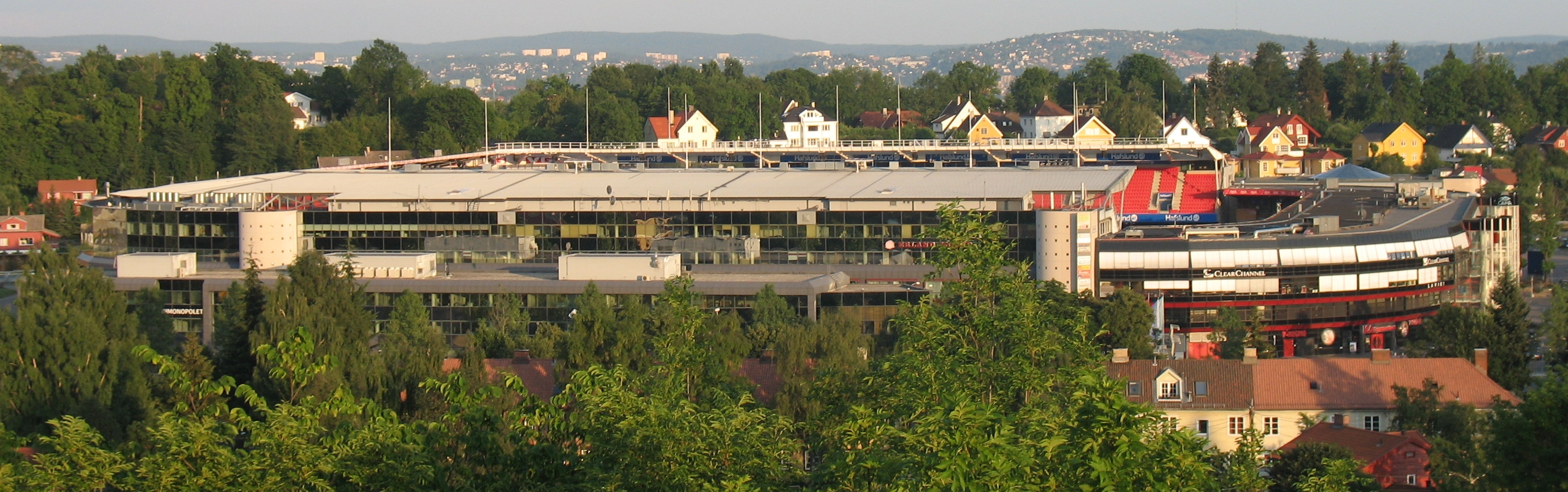
Ullevaal Stadion, Oslo - venue for the Norwegian Cup final

The 1989 Norwegian Football Cup was the 84th edition of the Norwegian Football Cup. The final took place at Ullevaal Stadion in Oslo on 22 October 1989. Viking were in their 8th final (3 wins and 4 runners-up), while Molde were in their second final after losing the 1982 final against Brann and therefore had the chance to win the first trophy in the club's history. The match was drawn and was replayed on 29 October 1989 resulting in a win for Viking.

== Calendar ==
Below are the dates for each round as given by the official schedule:

| Round | Date(s) | Number of fixtures | Clubs |
|---|---|---|---|
| First round | 6–7 June 1989 | 64 | 128 → 64 |
| Second round | 21–22 June 1989 | 32 | 64 → 32 |
| Third round | 5 July 1989 | 16 | 32 → 16 |
| Fourth round | 26 July 1989 | 9 | 16 → 8 |
| Quarter-finals | 16 August 1989 | 5 | 8 → 4 |
| Semi-finals | 16–17 September 1989 | 2 | 4 → 2 |
| Final | 22 October 1989 | 2 | 2 → 1 |

== First round ==
| Team 1 | Score | Team 2 |
|---|---|---|
6 June 1989
| Asker | 3–0 | Skeid |
| Fram Larvik | 1–0 | Nøtterøy |
| Gevir Bodø | 5–4 | Stålkameratene |
| Kopervik | 0–1 | Ålgård |
7 June 1989
| Alvdal | 3–0 | Røros |
| Askim | 0–3 | Moss |
| Aurskog-Finstadbru | 0–1 | Strømmen |
| Bergsøy | 3–0 | Hareid |
| Brann | 3–0 | Ny-Krohnborg |
| Brattvåg | 1–2 | Kristiansund |
| Clausenengen | 2–0 | Sunndal |
| Eik-Tønsberg | 5–0 | Odd |
| Ekholt | 3–8 | Mjøndalen |
| Elverum | 0–1 (a.e.t.) | Sander |
| Fauske/Sprint | 1–4 | Mjølner |
| Flekkefjord | 0–2 | Start |
| Fyllingen | 5–0 | Varegg |
| Geilo | 1–2 | Frigg |
| Gjelleråsen | 0–4 | Vålerengen |
| Gran | 3–8 | HamKam |
| Grim | 1–0 | Jerv |
| Grue | 2–0 | Kongsvinger |
| Haugar | 1–1 (6–5 p) | Djerv 1919 |
| Hinna | 1–6 | Bryne |
| Hovding | 0–1 | Vard |
| Hødd | 1–0 | Aalesund |
| Kapp | 2–2 (2–4 p) | Raufoss |
| KIL/Hemne | 0–2 | Stjørdals-Blink |
| Klepp | 2–3 | Viking |
| Kolbotn | 2–0 | Kjelsås |
| Kvik Halden | 1–3 | Fredrikstad |
| Langesund | 5–2 | Donn |
| Liv/Fossekallen | 0–3 | Lillestrøm |
| Luna | 3–2 | Andenes |
| Lyn | 2–2 (1–4 p) | Grei |
| Lyngbø | 1–2 | Fana |
| Mosjøen | 1–2 | Bodø/Glimt |
| Nardo | 0–2 | Steinkjer |
| FK Narvik/Nor | 1–5 | Harstad |
| Nybergsund | 5–3 (a.e.t.) | Lørenskog |
| Otta | 2–5 | Sogndal |
| Ottestad | 1–2 (a.e.t.) | Faaberg |
| Pors | 3–1 | Stokke |
| Ranheim | 1–16 | Rosenborg |
| Sandefjord BK | 3–2 (a.e.t.) | Larvik Turn |
| Selbak | 3–2 | Mercantile |
| Skarp | 3–0 | Honningsvåg |
| Skjervøy | 1–3 | Tromsø |
| Slemmestad | 1–4 | Ørn |
| Sprint-Jeløy | 5–2 | Drøbak/Frogn |
| Stord | 2–1 (a.e.t.) | Vadmyra |
| Strindheim | 2–1 | Neset |
| Stryn | 5–1 | Florø |
| Strømsgodset | 6–2 | Drafn |
| Tertnes | 0–4 | Os |
| Tranabakkan | 1–6 | Namsos |
| Tromsdalen | 0–2 | Ulfstind |
| Trosvik | 0–1 | Råde |
| Træff | 1–2 | Volda |
| Ulf-Sandnes | 2–2 (5–3 p) | Randaberg |
| Ullern | 4–3 (a.e.t.) | Ready |
| Verdal | 2–2 (6–5 p) | Nidelv/Falken |
| Vidar | 5–0 | Figgjo |
| Åndalsnes | 2–4 | Molde |

== Second round ==
| Team 1 | Score | Team 2 |
|---|---|---|
21 June 1989
| Bodø/Glimt | 5–0 | Gevir Bodø |
| Eik-Tønsberg | 4–2 | Selbak |
| Fana | 3–1 | Brann |
| Fredrikstad | 2–2 (3–4 p) | Sandefjord BK |
| Faaberg | 2–0 | Grue |
| Grei | 0–3 | Strømsgodset |
| HamKam | 5–2 | Nybergsund |
| Harstad | 6–2 | Luna |
| Kristiansund | 1–1 (3–5 p) | Hødd |
| Lillestrøm | 1–0 | Asker |
| Mjølner | 1–0 | Skarp |
| Mjøndalen | 1–0 | Langesund |
| Molde | 11–0 | Bergsøy |
| Moss | 5–2 | Fram Larvik |
| Namsos | 1–1 (1–3 p) | Stjørdals-Blink |
| Os | 2–1 | Fyllingen |
| Raufoss | 2–5 | Alvdal |
| Rosenborg | 8–0 | Verdal |
| Sander | 0–3 | Frigg |
| Sogndal | 2–1 | Stryn |
| Start | 3–0 | Grim |
| Steinkjer | 4–3 (a.e.t.) | Strindheim |
| Stord | 4–1 | Haugar |
| Strømmen | 0–2 (a.e.t.) | Ullern |
| Ulfstind | 0–8 | Tromsø |
| Viking | 8–1 | Ulf-Sandnes |
| Volda | 3–0 | Clausenengen |
| Vålerengen | 7–2 | Sprint-Jeløy |
| Ålgård | 1–2 | Bryne |
22 June 1989
| Ørn | 1–0 | Pors |
| Råde | 2–1 (a.e.t.) | Kolbotn |
| Vard | 1–4 | Vidar |

== Third round ==
| Team 1 | Score | Team 2 |
|---|---|---|
4 July 1989
| Stjørdals-Blink | 1–4 | Mjøndalen |
5 July 1989
| Alvdal | 0–5 | Rosenborg |
| Bryne | 6–0 | Os |
| Fana | 1–0 | Stord |
| Frigg | 2–2 (8–7 p) | Råde |
| Faaberg | 2–1 (a.e.t.) | Moss |
| Harstad | 1–0 (a.e.t.) | Mjølner |
| Hødd | 1–2 | Molde |
| Sandefjord BK | 0–5 | Vålerengen |
| Start | 1–3 | Eik-Tønsberg |
| Steinkjer | 3–4 | Lillestrøm |
| Strømsgodset | 8–0 | Ørn |
| Tromsø | 3–1 | Bodø/Glimt |
| Ullern | 0–5 | HamKam |
| Vidar | 2–4 (a.e.t.) | Viking |
| Volda | 0–2 | Sogndal |

== Fourth round ==
26 July 1989

| Eik-Tønsberg | 1–0 | Fana |
|---|---|---|
| Lindseth 60' |

Tønsberg Gressbane, Tønsberg
Attendance: 2,825
Referee: Christian Raabe

26 July 1989

| Lillestrøm | 3–1 | Tromsø |
|---|---|---|
| Amundsen 49', 59'; Dyrstad 89' | | Johansen 80' |

Åråsen Stadion, Lillestrøm
Attendance: 5,653
Referee: Kjell Nordby

26 July 1989

| Molde | 0–0 (a.e.t.) | Frigg |

Molde Stadion, Molde
Attendance: 2,182
Referee: Thorbjørn Aass

26 July 1989

| Rosenborg | 7–1 | Bryne |
|---|---|---|
| Jakobsen 5'; Sørloth 35', 89'; Ingebrigtsen 46'; Brandhaug 54' (pen.), 89'; Berg 56' | | Meinseth 70' (pen.) |

Lerkendal Stadion, Trondheim
Attendance: 11,541
Referee: Einar Halle

26 July 1989

| Sogndal | 2–0 | Vålerengen |
|---|---|---|
| Christiansen 52'; Hopen 72' |

Fosshaugane, Sogndalsfjøra
Attendance: 1,545
Referee: Lars Kåre Rogne

26 July 1989

| Strømsgodset | 0–1 | Faaberg |
|---|---|---|
| | | Voldsrud 51' |

Marienlyst Stadion, Drammen
Attendance: 4,540
Referee: Tore Hollung

26 July 1989

| Viking | 2–1 (a.e.t.) | Harstad |
|---|---|---|
| Jonevret 41', 120' | | Andreassen 32' |

Stavanger Stadion, Stavanger
Attendance: 2,908
Referee: Sven Kjellbrott

27 July 1989

| Mjøndalen | 2–3 | HamKam |
|---|---|---|
| Engan 19'; Fornes 53' | | Kristiansen 18'; Kollshaugen 27' (pen.), 35' |

Nedre Eiker Stadion, Mjøndalen
Attendance: 2,678
Referee: Per Arne Larsgård

=== Replay ===
2 August 1989

| Frigg | 2–3 | Molde |
|---|---|---|
| Raddum 21'; Bendiksen 55' | | Evensen 17'; Flo 43'; Belsvik 86' |

Bislett Stadion, Oslo
Attendance: 3,002
Referee: Per Arne Larsgård

== Quarter-finals ==
16 August 1989

| Faaberg | 2–3 | Viking |
|---|---|---|
| Hammershaug 39'; Wilborn 79' | | Gjerde 13'; Christiansen 34'; Malmedal 69' |

Jorekstad Stadion, Fåberg
Attendance: 4,096
Referee: Rune Pedersen

16 August 1989

| HamKam | 1–0 (a.e.t.) | Rosenborg |
|---|---|---|
| Kollshaugen 109' |

Briskeby gressbane, Hamar
Attendance: 9,559
Referee: Roy Helge Olsen

16 August 1989

| Lillestrøm | 2–2 (a.e.t.) | Eik-Tønsberg |
|---|---|---|
| Buer 75'; Nysæther 77' | | Kristiansen 38'; Markussen 89' |

Åråsen Stadion, Lillestrøm
Attendance: 3,666
Referee: Erling Haugen

16 August 1989

| Sogndal | 4–5 | Molde |
|---|---|---|
| Christiansen 9'; Hopen 48'; Hillestad 65'; Nilsen 74' | | Kristiansen 1'; Flo 17', 56'; Belsvik 53', 63' |

Fosshaugane, Sogndalsfjøra
Attendance: 2,020
Referee: Aril Haugstad

=== Replay ===
24 August 1989

| Eik-Tønsberg | 3–1 (a.e.t.) | Lillestrøm |
|---|---|---|
| Johannessen 97'; Edvardsen 109' (pen.); Fagernes 117' | | Nysæther 100' |

Tønsberg Gressbane, Tønsberg
Attendance: 7,423
Referee: Christian Raabe

== Semi-finals ==
16 September 1989

| Viking | 3–1 | HamKam |
|---|---|---|
| Fjetland 27'; Soltvedt 37'; Holmberg 60' | | Solbakken 5' |

Stavanger Stadion, Stavanger
Attendance: 9,465
Referee: Kjell Nordby

17 September 1989

| Molde | 1–0 | Eik-Tønsberg |
|---|---|---|
| Bjørnsgård 6' (o.g.) |

Molde Stadion, Molde
Attendance: 9,036
Referee: Kaare Lindboe

== Final ==
=== First match ===
22 October 1989
13:15 CEST (UTC+2)

| Molde | 2–2 (a.e.t.) | Viking |
|---|---|---|
| Neerland 71'; Belsvik 90' | Report | Tveit 23'; Holmberg 61' |

Ullevaal Stadion, Oslo
Attendance: 23,000
Referee: Rune Pedersen (Sprint/Jeløy)

=== Replay match ===
29 October 1989
13:15 CET (UTC+1)

| Viking | 2–1 | Molde |
|---|---|---|
| Fjetland 15'; Tveit 47' | Report | Sperre 38' |

Ullevaal Stadion, Oslo
Attendance: 9,856
Referee: Egil Nervik (Freidig)

== See also ==
- 1989 Norwegian Football Cup final
- 1989 1. divisjon
- 1989 2. divisjon
