= Cato Hansen =

Norwegian footballer (born 1988)

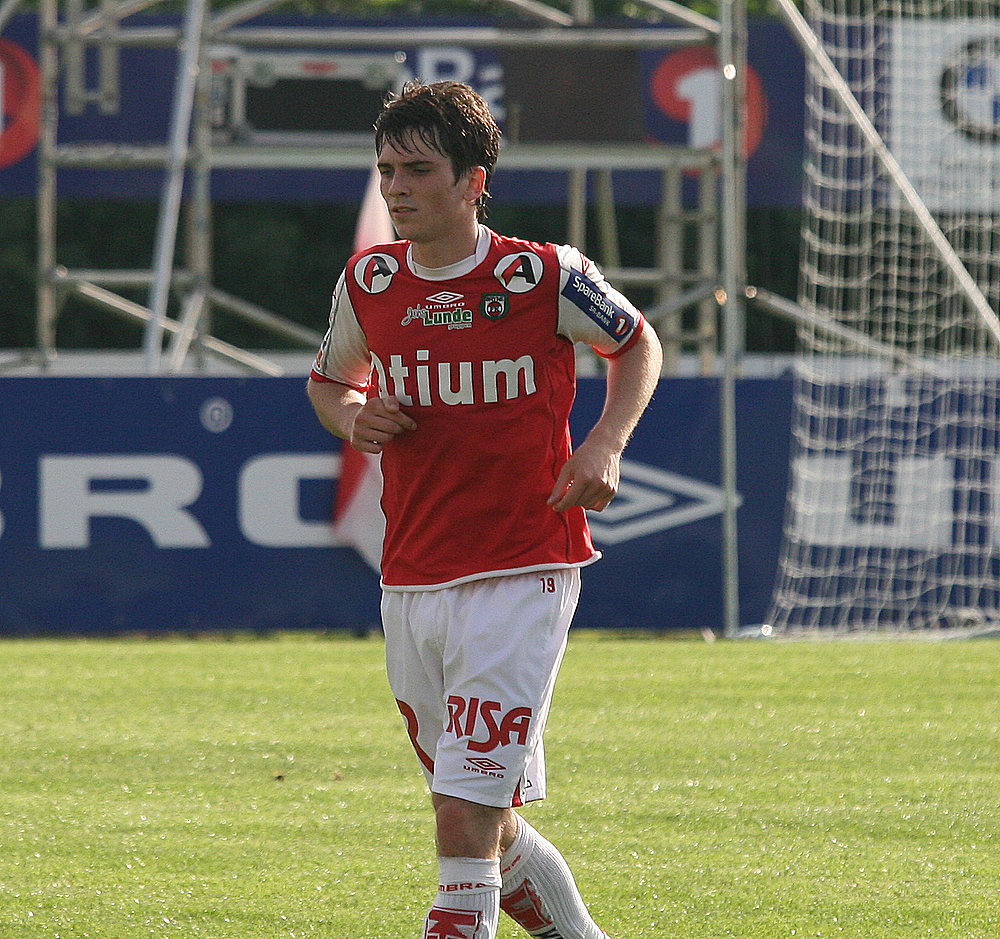
- Hansen with Bryne

Personal information
- Date of birth: 26 May 1988 (age 38)
- Place of birth: Bryne, Norway
- Height: 1.76 m (5 ft 9 in)
- Position: Forward

Youth career
- 1999–2007: Bryne

Senior career*
Years	Team	Apps	(Gls)
2006–2008	Bryne	44	(10)
2009–2011	Brann	23	(0)
2009	→ Løv-Ham (loan)	9	(6)
2011–2012	Sogndal	20	(0)
2012–2014	Sandefjord	52	(9)
2015	Egersund	23	(8)
2016	Frøyland IL	5	(0)
2017	Rosseland 2	5	(4)
2018–2019	Rosseland	21	(21)

International career
2008–2009	Norway U-21	8	(3)
- * Club domestic league appearances and goals

Cato Hansen (born 26 May 1988) is a Norwegian former professional footballer who played as a forward.

== Career ==
Hansen came to Brann from Bryne before the 2009 season. At Bryne, he played 45 times, scoring 10 goals in the Norwegian First Division.

On 7 August 2009, Hansen was loaned out to the first division club Løv-Ham for the remainder of the 2009 season.

On 29 March 2012, Hansen signed for Sandefjord.

Hansen has also played eight games for the Norway U21 national team.

== Personal life ==
He is the son of former Norway international footballer Hugo Hansen and his sister, Hege, plays as a striker for the Toppserien club Arna-Bjørnar, as well as being capped for Norway women's national football team, with youngest sister Tuva Hansen a Bayern Munich player.

== Career statistics ==
Appearances and goals by club, season and competition
Club	Season	League			Cup		Total	
Club	Season	Division	Apps	Goals	Apps	Goals	Apps	Goals
Bryne	2006	Norwegian First Division	4	0	0	0	4	0
Bryne	2007	Norwegian First Division	14	5	1	1	15	6
Bryne	2008	Norwegian First Division	26	5	0	0	26	5
Bryne	Total		44	10	1	1	45	11
Brann	2009	Tippeligaen	6	0	4	2	10	2
Brann	2010	Tippeligaen	17	0	2	1	19	1
Brann	Total		23	0	6	3	29	3
Løv-Ham (loan)	2009	Norwegian First Division	9	6	0	0	9	6
Sogndal	2011	Tippeligaen	20	0	4	2	24	2
Sandefjord	2012	Norwegian First Division	29	8	2	0	31	8
Sandefjord	2013	Norwegian First Division	19	1	1	0	20	1
Sandefjord	2014	1. divisjon	4	0	0	0	4	0
Sandefjord	Total		42	9	3	0	45	9
Egersund	2015	2. divisjon	23	8	1	0	23	8
Career total			171	33	15	6	186	39
