= Roger Nilsen =

Norwegian footballer (born 1969)

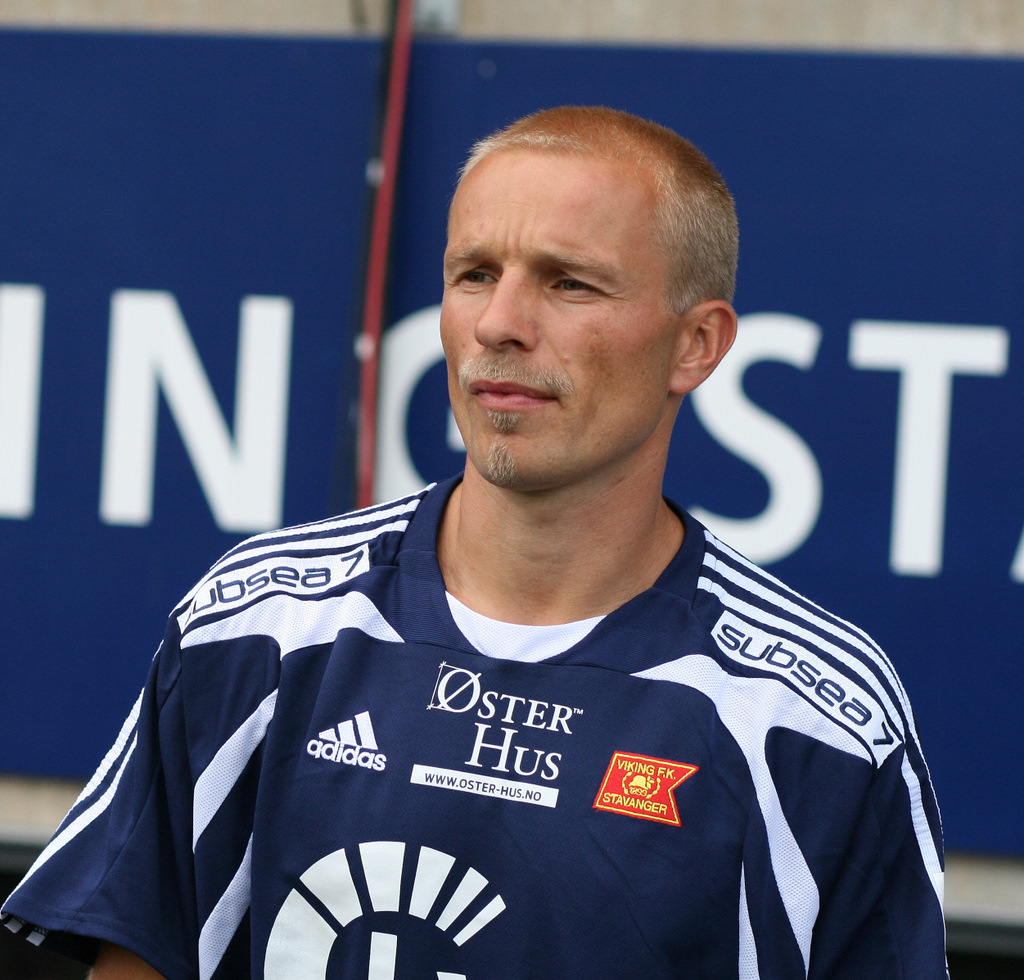
- Nilsen during a show game against Liverpool

Personal information
- Date of birth: 8 August 1969 (age 57)
- Place of birth: Tromsø, Norway
- Height: 1.80 m (5 ft 11 in)
- Position: Defender

Youth career
- Kvaløysletta

Senior career*
Years	Team	Apps	(Gls)
1987–1988	Tromsø	3	(0)
1989–1993	Viking	90	(11)
1993	→ 1. FC Köln (loan)	10	(0)
1993–1999	Sheffield United	166	(0)
1999	Tottenham Hotspur	2	(0)
1999–2000	Grazer AK	13	(0)
2000–2001	Molde	20	(2)
2002–2003	Bryne	24	(0)
Total		329	(13)

International career
1989–1992	Norway U21	19	(2)
1990–2000	Norway	32	(3)

Managerial career
- 2006: Stavanger
- 2007–2010: Viking (assistant)
- 2014–: Fløya (women)
- * Club domestic league appearances and goals

Roger Nilsen (born 8 August 1969) is a Norwegian football coach and former player. A defender, he played for the Norwegian clubs Tromsø, Viking, Molde and Bryne, and spent time abroad at 1. FC Köln, Sheffield United, Tottenham Hotspur and Grazer AK. He made 32 appearances and scored three goals for Norway. He later worked as assistant coach at Viking.

== Club career ==
=== Viking FK ===
Born in Tromsø, Nilsen's career began in Tromsø, but it was after he moved on to Viking that he became established, winning Tippeligaen, the Norwegian top division in 1991. In his four seasons at Viking, Nilsen successfully became a regular in Norway's U21 team, and won his first senior cap in 1990. He was loaned to 1. FC Köln, and was put up for sale towards the end of the 1993 season.

=== Sheffield United ===
Having already signed Norwegian team-mate Jostein Flo, Sheffield United boss Dave Bassett added Nilsen in November 1993 for the fee of £500,000, beating Aberdeen to his signature. Nilsen joined as the club fought unsuccessfully against relegation from the Premier League, and was a regular at left-back.

A popular figure at Bramall Lane, Nilsen played six seasons under five different managers, with a number of games at centre-back - particularly after United switched to a wing-back formation in 1997/98. He started the 1997 playoff final defeat at Wembley against Crystal Palace, and United's defeat to Newcastle in the FA Cup semi-final in 1998. It was in that cup-run where Nilsen had arguably his most memorable moment, during the quarter-final penalty shootout win over Coventry City. Never scoring for the Blades, and with Gareth Taylor having missed the first United penalty, Nilsen stepped up to convert the second - powering the ball past Steve Ogrizovic to put the Blades 1–0 up.

Nilsen's final appearance came as he helped keep a clean sheet in a 3–0 win over West Brom in Feb 1999, before a surprise return to the Premier League saw him transferred to Tottenham Hotspur on a free.

=== Later career ===
After making just two appearances at Spurs, Nilsen had a brief spell at Grazer AK before he returned home to play for Molde and Bryne. He left Bryne in 2003, but continued his career in the Norwegian third division with Stavanger IF.

== International career ==
Nilsen represented Norway at youth international level and played for the under-20 team in the 1989 FIFA World Youth Championship. He played 19 matches and scored two goals for Norway U21.

Nilsen made his debut for the senior team in the friendly match against Cameroon on 31 October 1990. He scored his first goal for Norway against Sweden on 26 August 1992, and scored two goals in the 10–0 win against San Marino two weeks later. Nilsen was a part of the 1994 FIFA World Cup squad, but did not play any matches in the tournament. He played his last match for Norway against Sweden on 4 February 2000. Nilsen was capped a total of 32 times, and scored three goals.

== Coaching career ==
In 2006, he retired and took over as head coach for Stavanger IF, guiding the club to promotion to the second division. At the end of the season, Nilsen left the club to take up the assistant coach position at the Norwegian top-flight side Viking. After manager Uwe Rösler left in November 2009 he was briefly caretaker manager. He was downsized from his assistant job after the 2010 season.

In 2014, he succeeded Odd-Karl Stangnes as manager of IF Fløya's women's team, combined with a teaching job at the Norwegian College of Elite Sports in Tromsø. In September 2018 Nilsen was sacked from his role managing FK Vidar with the club 2nd bottom in the 2nd division.

== Personal life ==
Roger Nilsen is the brother of the former player and coach Steinar Nilsen.
