= Lars Gaute Bø =

Norwegian footballer (born 1963)

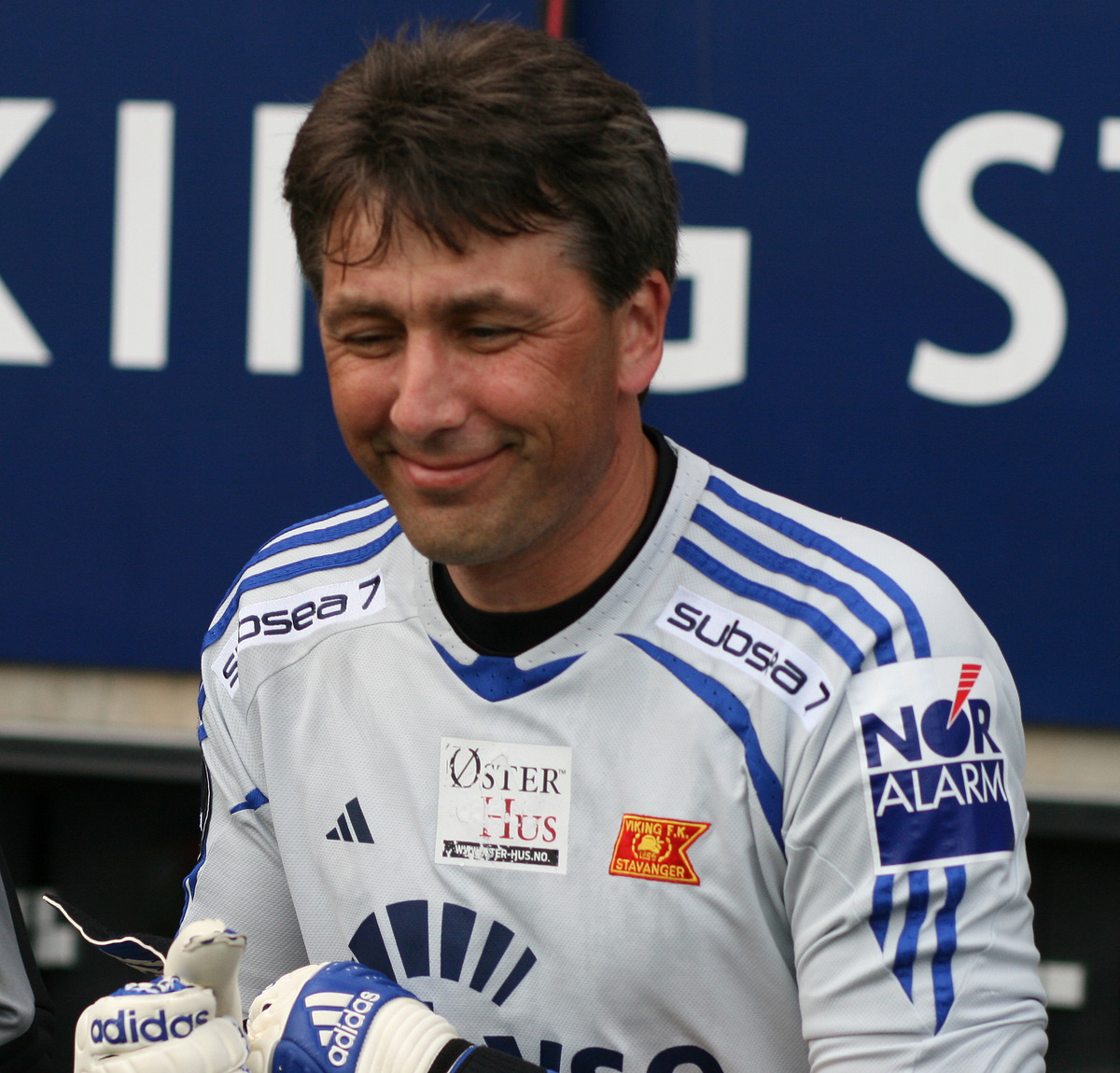
- Lars Gaute Bø in 2008

Personal information
- Date of birth: 20 November 1963 (age 62)
- Height: 1.84 m (6 ft 0 in)
- Position: Goalkeeper

Senior career*
Years	Team	Apps	(Gls)
1985–1988	Bryne	65	(0)
1989–1992	Viking	88	(0)
1993–1995	Varhaug		
1996	Viking	24	(0)
1998–2000	Viking	69	(0)

International career
1987	Norway	1	(0)
- * Club domestic league appearances and goals

Lars Gaute Bø (born 20 November 1963) is a Norwegian footballer.

Bø started his elite career in Bryne FK and moved to regional rivals Viking FK, playing every round in the Norwegian first tier from 1987 through 1992. He won the 1991 Eliteserien and the 1989 Cup with Viking, and the 1987 Cup with Bryne. He played in one match for the Norway national football team in 1987.
