= Jørn Karlsrud =

Norwegian footballer (born 1965)

Personal information
- Date of birth: 10 December 1965 (age 60)
- Position: Midfielder

Senior career*
Years	Team	Apps	(Gls)
–1987	Askim		
1988–1991	Moss		
1992–2001	Kongsvinger	211	(23)
2002–2003	Galterud		
2004	Kongsvinger B team		
2008	Galterud		

Managerial career
- 2002–2003: Galterud (playing assistant coach)
- 2004–????: Kongsvinger (assistant coach)
- * Club domestic league appearances and goals

Jørn Karlsrud (born 10 October 1965) is a retired Norwegian football midfielder.

He started his career in Askim IF, and joined Moss FK ahead of the 1988 season. He signed for Kongsvinger IL ahead of the 1992 season, was ever-present in 1992 and only missed one Norwegian Premier League game between 1992 and 1997. In 1998, he only played two games, but then returned as a regular until leaving in 2001.

He joined Galterud IF as playing assistant coach. After the 2003 season he rejoined Kongsvinger IL as an assistant coach. He also played briefly for Kongsvinger IL's B team. In 2008, he played for Galterud.
