= Jan Fjetland =

Norwegian footballer (born 1962)

Personal information
- Full name: Jan Fjetland
- Date of birth: 12 August 1962 (age 64)
- Place of birth: Stavanger, Norway
- Position: Forward

Senior career*
Years	Team	Apps	(Gls)
–1988	Vidar		
1989	Viking	8	(1)
1990–1994	Vidar		

International career
1979	Norway U16	1	(1)
1980	Norway U19	5	(2)
- * Club domestic league appearances and goals

Jan Fjetland (born 12 August 1962) is a Norwegian former footballer who played as a forward. He spent most of his career at Vidar, with the exception of 1989 when he played for Viking and won the Norwegian Cup. He is the twin brother of Egil Fjetland.

== Club career ==
Fjetland started his career in his hometown-club Vidar. He played 500 matches and scored 289 goals for the club during the 1980s, when Vidar was competing for promotion to the top league, and the beginning of the 1990s until he retired in 1994. Fjetland is the most-scoring player on Vidar and the player with second-most appearances for the club, and is one of the best players that have played for Vidar.

Fjetland moved to Viking with his twinbrother, Egil Fjetland ahead of the 1989-season. While Egil played for Viking for four seasons, Jan only stayed at the club for one year. He played eight matches and scored one goal in the league while scoring two goals in four matches in the cup. Fjetland was nicknamed "Postmannen" during his time at Viking, because he was working as a postman in addition to playing football.

Fjetland stated before he joined Viking, that he joined the club to win the Norwegian Cup final, and he delivered his best performance for Viking in the rematch of the 1989 Norwegian Cup final. Fjetland scored the first goal when Molde was beaten 2–1, and together with Alf Kåre Tveit he was Viking's best player in the match. That match was also the last time Fjetland played alongside his brother for Viking, and it took 22 years before another pair of brothers (Valon and Veton Berisha) started a match together for Viking.

== International career ==
Fjetland scored in his international debut at youth level, in Norway U16's match against Sweden U16 on 29 September 1979. The next year he played five matches for the Under-19 team, in which he scored two goals.
