= Svein Andreassen =

Norwegian footballer (born 1968)

Personal information
- Full name: Svein Are Andreassen
- Date of birth: 3 July 1968 (age 58)
- Place of birth: Stokmarknes, Norway
- Position: Forward

Senior career*
Years	Team	Apps	(Gls)
1990–1995	Tromsø	58	(8)
1997	Sogndal	20	(4)
1998–1999	Lillestrøm	16	(4)
1998–1999	→ Portsmouth (loan)	2	(0)
1999	Harstad	1	(0)
2014	Medkila 2	3	(1)
Total		100	(17)
- * Club domestic league appearances and goals

Svein Are Andreassen (born 3 July 1968) is a Norwegian former footballer who played as a forward.

== Career ==
He was born in Stokmarknes, lived in Tromsø from age one to seven before the family settled in Harstad. He played youth football for Kilkameratene and Harstad IL, and made his first-team debut for Harstad around 1986. From 1990 to 1995 he played for Tromsø IL.

He never fully broke into the first team, and resumed his career at Sogndal in 1996–1997 and Lillestrøm in 1998. For the remained of the 1998–99 season he played for Portsmouth in England. After the season concluded he gave up on professional football, following multiple injuries and twenty-two surgeries. He did however feature for Harstad IL.
