= Egil Fjetland =

Norwegian footballer (born 1962)

Personal information
- Full name: Egil Fjetland
- Date of birth: 12 August 1962 (age 64)
- Place of birth: Stavanger, Norway
- Position: Forward

Senior career*
Years	Team	Apps	(Gls)
–1988	Vidar		
1989–1992	Viking	48	(11)

International career
1980	Norway U19	5	(0)
1989	Norway B	1	(0)
- * Club domestic league appearances and goals

Egil Fjetland (born 12 August 1962) is a Norwegian former footballer who played as a forward for Vidar and Viking, where he won the Norwegian Cup and Tippeligaen. He is the twin brother of Jan Fjetland.

== Club career ==
Fjetland was born in Stavanger and started his career in the local club Vidar. Vidar experienced its heyday in the mid 80's, when they were playing at the second tier and fighting for promotion. Fjetland was one of the key-members in Vidar's team, and in the promotion-playoff in 1986 Vidar won the first match against Drøbak-Frogn. However, Fjetland was sent off and couldn't help his team in the second match against Tromsø, which Vidar lost and missed out on promotion. In total Fjetland played 235 matches and scored 113 goals for Vidar.

Fjetland played for Viking from 1989 to 1992 where he played a total of 92 matches (including friendlies) scoring 21 goals for the club, and was together with Ingve Bøe and Børre Meinseth Viking's joint topscorer with 4 goals in 1992. With Viking, Fjetland won the Norwegian Cup in 1989 and Tippeligaen in 1991.

== International career ==
Fjetland played his first match with the Norwegian flag on the shirt on 7 August 1979, when Norway U16 met Finland U16. He played a total of four matches and scored one goal for the Under-16 team, in addition to five matches for the Norway U19 in 1980. He also played one match for Norway B against England B on 22 May 1989.

== Personal life ==
Fjetland's is the twin-brother of Jan Fjetland, and in addition to playing together at Vidar they both spent the 1989-season at Viking. The 1989 Norwegian Cup final was the last they played together, and they were the last brothers to start a match together for Viking until 2011 when Valon and Veton Berisha repeated the feat.
