= Øystein Neerland =

Norwegian footballer (born 1964)

Personal information
- Full name: Øystein Neerland
- Date of birth: 4 February 1964 (age 62)
- Position: Forward

Senior career*
| Years | Team | Apps | (Gls) |
| 1987–1993 | Molde | 120 | (34) |
- * Club domestic league appearances and goals

Øystein Neerland (born 4 February 1964) is a former Norwegian football forward, best known for his time in Molde.

== Career ==
He came to Molde from Skåla in 1987. In the last match of the season on 10 October 1987 against Moss, Jostein Flo and Neerland had several opportunities to score the decisive goal and make Molde win the league, but Moss won the match 2-0 which made Moss champions while Molde had to settle with silver.

Neerland scored one goal when Molde and Viking met in the final of 1989 Norwegian Cup. The final ended 2-2, and it took a replay to decide a winner which Viking won 2–1. Neerland was Molde's top goalscorer with 11 goals in 1991, and when his career in Molde ended in 1993 he had scored 34 goals in 120 matches.

== Career statistics ==
| Season | Club | Division | League | | Cup | | Total | |
| Season | Club | Division | Apps | Goals | Apps | Goals | Apps | Goals |
|---|---|---|---|---|---|---|---|---|
| 1987 | Molde | First Division | 21 | 6 | ? | ? | 21 | 6 |
| 1988 | Molde | First Division | 20 | 6 | ? | ? | 20 | 6 |
| 1989 | Molde | First Division | 17 | 4 | ? | ? | 17 | 4 |
| 1990 | Molde | First Division | 15 | 5 | ? | ? | 15 | 5 |
| 1991 | Molde | Tippeligaen | 22 | 11 | ? | ? | 22 | 11 |
| 1992 | Molde | Tippeligaen | 10 | 2 | ? | ? | 10 | 2 |
| 1993 | Molde | Tippeligaen | 15 | 0 | ? | ? | 15 | 0 |
| Career Total | | | 120 | 34 | ? | ? | 120 | 34 |
