= Ronald Wenaas =

Norwegian football player (born 1968)

Personal information
- Date of birth: 25 July 1968 (age 58)
- Position: Midfielder

Senior career*
Years	Team	Apps	(Gls)
1986	Rival		
1987–1990	Molde	52	(5)
1991	Kristiansund FK		
1992–1994	Strindheim		
1995–1997	Molde	29	(1)
1998–2001	Strindheim	50	(6)

Managerial career
- 2002–2008: Strindheim
- * Club domestic league appearances and goals

Ronald Weenas (born 25 July 1968) is a Norwegian former football player, most notably for Molde FK.

== Playing career ==
Wenaas started his senior career at Rival and became a Molde player in 1987. On 16 May 1988, he made his debut for the club as a substitute for Torbjørn Evensen in Molde's 4–1 win away from home against Brann. On 24 July 1988, he scored his first goal in Molde's 6–2 win at home against Bryne. He was in the starting lineups in both finals of the 1989 Norwegian Cup where Molde drew 2–2 against Viking in the first final and lost 1–2 in the replay.

Wenaas was transferred to Kristiansund FK in 1991 and moved on to Strindheim after one season in Kristiansund. He returned to Molde in 1995, where he stayed for four seasons. He played a total of 81 league matches and scored 6 goals during his 8 years in Molde. He ended his career with a second spell at Strindheim, which lasted from 1998 till the end of the 2001 season.

== Coaching career ==
In 2002, Wenaas became head coach at Strindheim where he stayed until 2008.
