= Hugo Hansen =

Norwegian footballer (born 1967)

Personal information
- Full name: Hugo-André Hansen
- Date of birth: 1 August 1967 (age 59)
- Place of birth: Vega Municipality

Youth career
- Stålkameratene

Senior career*
Years	Team	Apps	(Gls)
1985–1988	Bryne	76	(4)
1989	Molde	22	(1)
1990–1991	Rosenborg	20	(0)
1992–1996	Bryne		
- Orre
- Frøyland
- Rosseland

International career
1986–1990	Norway	14	(0)
- * Club domestic league appearances and goals

Hugo Hansen (born 1 August 1967) is a Norwegian former professional footballer who played for Bryne, Molde and Rosenborg during his professional career. Hansen won the Norwegian Cup with Bryne in 1987, and was capped 14 times for Norway. He is the father of Tuva Hansen, Cato Hansen and Hege Hansen.
