= Sverre Brandhaug =

Norwegian footballer (born 1959)

Personal information
- Date of birth: 22 June 1959 (age 67)
- Place of birth: Trondheim, Norway
- Position: Central midfielder

Senior career*
Years	Team	Apps	(Gls)
- Trondheims-Ørn
- Strindheim
1981–1991	Rosenborg	225	(84)

International career
	Norway	35	(2)
- * Club domestic league appearances and goals

Sverre Brandhaug (born 22 June 1959) is a retired football player from Norway, who played as a central midfield from 1981 to 1991 for Rosenborg BK in the Norwegian Premier League. He also played for Trondheims-Ørn SK and Strindheim IL. Brandhaug played 35 times for Norway and scored 2 goals.
