= Thor André Olsen =

Norwegian footballer and coach (born 1964)

Personal information
- Date of birth: 28 April 1964 (age 62)
- Place of birth: Mo i Rana, Norway
- Position: Goalkeeper

Senior career*
Years	Team	Apps	(Gls)
1982–1986	Mo IL		
1987–1990	Molde FK	78	
1991–1993	SK Brann	59	
1994–1997	Djurgårdens IF	99	
1998	AaB		
1999	→ IFK Norrköping (loan)	6	
1999	Lillestrøm SK	0	
2000–2007	Mo IL		

International career
1985–1989	Norway U21	3	(0)
1989	Norway B	1	(0)

Managerial career
- 2001–2007: Mo (goalkeeping coach)
- 2008: Stålkameratene (interim)
- 2009–2010: Stålkameratene
- 2011–2018: Mo
- * Club domestic league appearances and goals

Thor André Olsen (born 28 April 1964) is a Norwegian football coach and former goalkeeper. His last position was head coach in Mo IL.

== Club career ==
Thor André Olsen played for Mo IL, Molde FK, SK Brann, Djurgårdens IF, Aalborg, IFK Norrköping and Lillestrøm SK.

In 1987, Olsen transferred to Molde. In 1988, newspaper VG named him player of the year in Norwegian football. In 1991, he went on to play for Brann where he played three seasons. Olsen then continued his career in Sweden, where he joined then second tier side Djurgården. In his first season at the club, he helped the team win promotion to Allsvenskan. In 1995, He received the Årets Järnkamin award from supporters club Järnkaminerna for his performances and values.

He retired from football in 2004.

== International career ==
Thor André Olsen represented the Norway national under-21 team three times, debuting on 21 May 1985 against Sweden. In 1989 he played one game for Norway B against England B at Stavanger Stadion.

== Coaching career ==
In 2001, he became playing goalkeeping coach in Mo IL. Between 2008 and 2010, he was coaching Stålkameratene, before returning to Mo where he was head coach until 2018.

== Honours ==
=== Club ===
Djurgårdens IF

- Division 1 Norra (1): 1994

=== Individual ===
- Årets Järnkamin (1): 1995
