= Ole Erik Stavrum =

Norwegian footballer (born 1966)

Personal information
- Full name: Ole Erik Stavrum
- Date of birth: 30 December 1966 (age 59)
- Place of birth: Norway
- Position: Defender

Youth career
- –1985: Clausenengen

Senior career*
Years	Team	Apps	(Gls)
1986–1990	Molde	95	(9)
1991–1994	Brann	81	(4)
1995–1997	Molde	53	(2)
1998–1999	Clausenengen		
- * Club domestic league appearances and goals

Ole Erik Stavrum (born 30 December 1966) is a Norwegian former football defender. He is the son of Ole Stavrum, and older brother of Arild Stavrum. From 1 January 2020, he is managing director at Molde FK.

== Career as player ==
Stavrum started his career in Kristiansund, with the local club Clausenengen. He moved on to top flight club Molde in 1986, where he played for five seasons. In 1990, Stavrum and the club could not agree on a new contract, and he moved on to Brann. In Bergen he played 81 top-flight matches for Brann from 1991 to 1994. He transferred back to Molde in 1995, and played three seasons for the club. In 1998, Stavrum stepped down from professional football and played two seasons for his youth club Clausenengen, before he retired in 1999.

== Football executive ==
Stavrum is also member of the Molde FK board. On 4 September 2019, Molde announced that Stavrum would become the club's managing director effecting from 1 January 2020.
