= Petter Belsvik =

Norwegian footballer and coach (born 1967)

Personal information
- Date of birth: 2 October 1967 (age 59)
- Place of birth: Lillehammer, Norway
- Height: 1.88 m (6 ft 2 in)
- Position: Striker

Senior career*
Years	Team	Apps	(Gls)
1984–1985	Lillehammer	8	(1)
1985–1988	Faaberg	53	(21)
1989–1991	Molde	66	(28)
1992–1993	HamKam	40	(23)
1994–1995	Start	46	(38)
1994	→ Aalborg BK (loan)	3	(1)
1995	→ Southend United (loan)	3	(1)
1996–2000	Stabæk	94	(60)
1997	→ Austria Vienna (loan)	3	(0)
2000–2001	Rosenborg	15	(5)
2001–2002	Vålerenga	39	(12)
2003	Lillestrøm	13	(1)
Total		383	(191)

Managerial career
- 2004–2008: Stabæk (assistant)
- 2009–2011: Lillestrøm (assistant)
- 2011: Lillestrøm (caretaker)
- 2012–2013: Stabæk
- 2014–2018: Fram Larvik
- 2019: Kongsvinger (assistant)
- 2020–2022: Stabæk (assistant)
- 2023: Stabæk Kvinner
- 2024–: Larvik Turn
- * Club domestic league appearances and goals

Petter Belsvik (born 2 October 1967) is a Norwegian football coach and former player, who played as a striker. With 159 goals in the Norwegian Premier League he ranks third in the all-time goalscorer statistics, behind Harald Brattbakk. He never appeared for the Norwegian national team.

== Playing career ==
Belsvik is a so-called journeyman footballer, with spells in many clubs. He started his career in Faaberg, and played top league football for Molde, HamKam, Start, Stabæk, Rosenborg, Vålerenga and Lillestrøm. At the end of his career as a footballer he also had a short stay at the Norwegian amateur side Heming.

His impact on football abroad has been limited, with only short spells in Southend United, AaB and Austria Vienna. Belsvik also had an unsuccessful trial at Sunderland AFC

== Managing career ==
After finishing his playing career he was hired as an assistant coach in Stabæk. After Stabæk won the league in 2008, Belsvik became an assistant for Lillestrøm in 2009, taking briefly over as caretaker head coach in 2011.

Belsvik signed for Stabæk as head coach ahead of the 2012 season. He steered the club to relegation from the 2012 Tippeligaen, but then instant re-promotion from the 2013 Adeccoligaen. After the season, he left the position as head coach.

Ahead of the 2014 season he changed club to Fram Larvik.

== Honours ==
He became cup champion with Stabæk in 1998 and league champion with Rosenborg in 2000.
