= Alf Kåre Tveit =

Norwegian footballer (born 1967)

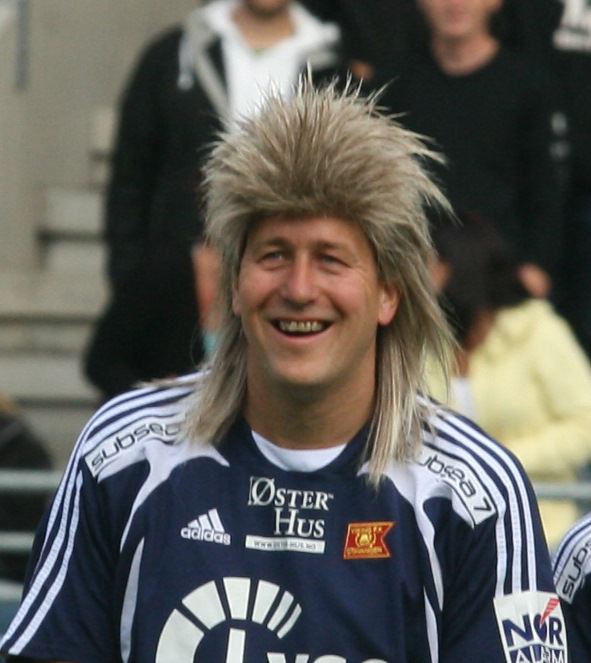
- Alf Kåre Tveit during an exhibition match against Liverpool F.C. in July 2008 at Viking Stadion. Tveit sports a hairdo similar to the one he wore in the late 1980s

Personal information
- Full name: Alf Kåre Tveit
- Date of birth: 26 April 1967 (age 59)
- Place of birth: Lyngdal Municipality
- Position: Striker

Senior career*
Years	Team	Apps	(Gls)
1988–1993	Viking	187	(86)
- * Club domestic league appearances and goals

Alf Kåre Tveit (born 26 April 1967) is a former footballer who played from 1988 to 1993 for Viking FK, where he won both the league and cup championship. He was selected for the national squad in a match against Scotland, but never got his first cap.

Tveit got the nickname fygaren for his celebrations after scoring, where he stretched his arms out ran in a zig-zag movement. He is also remembered for a controversial situation in a match against Vard in 1988. In overtime, he headed the ball out of the hands of the goalkeeper, rounded him and was tackled. The following penalty kick, made by Arild Ravndal, sent Viking to the 1st Division at the expense of Start, who had to go to play-offs.
