= Rune Pedersen (referee) =

Norwegian football referee

- Born: 19 May 1963 (age 63); Moss, Norway

Domestic
Years	League	Role
1987–2003	Norwegian Premier League	Referee

International
Years	League	Role
1989–2003	FIFA-listed	Referee

Rune Pedersen (born 19 May 1963) is a former football referee, representing SK Sprint-Jeløy. He was regarded as the best match official in Norway during the 1990s, and won the Kniksen award for "Referee of the year" 10 times between 1990 and 2000. In 1993 Roy Helge Olsen prevented Pedersen from 10 consecutive wins.

In 1998, Pedersen became the first Norwegian referee to appear in the main tournament of the FIFA World Cup. He refereed the group stage match between Argentina and Jamaica, and the quarter-final between Croatia and Germany where he gave Christian Wörns a straight red card for a foul near the end of the first half. In the first leg of the 2000–01 UEFA Cup semi-finals between Alavés and Kaiserslautern, Pedersen awarded four penalties (three for Alavés and one for Kaiserslautern) as Alavés won 5–1.

Rune Pedersen also won the Kniksen's honorary award in 1998. After retiring Pedersen was the Head of Referees for the Football Association of Norway until 2014.
