= Jostein Flo =

Norwegian footballer (born 1964)

- Jostein Flo (white shirt) playing for Norway against Italy in the 1994 FIFA World Cup

Personal information
- Full name: Jostein Flo
- Date of birth: 3 October 1964 (age 62)
- Place of birth: Flo, Stryn Municipality, Norway
- Height: 1.92 m (6 ft 4 in)
- Position: Striker

Youth career
- Stryn

Senior career*
Years	Team	Apps	(Gls)
1987–1990	Molde	72	(26)
1990–1991	Lierse	25	(7)
1991–1993	Sogndal	48	(28)
1993–1996	Sheffield United	84	(19)
1996–2002	Strømsgodset	161	(110)
Total		390	(190)

International career
1987–2000	Norway	53	(11)
- * Club domestic league appearances and goals

Jostein Flo (born 3 October 1964) is a Norwegian former footballer who played as a forward. Usually a centre-forward or striker, he was known for his physical playing style and aerial dominance, and was also capable of playing on the right flank. He was Sports Director in Strømsgodset.

== Career ==
At club level, Flo usually played as a centre-forward. For the Norway national team, he also acted as a target man, but instead played right winger, and was instrumental for the tactics applied by former Norway coach Egil Olsen. Playing a characteristic 4–5–1 formation, the left back would often hit long crosses to Flo, who in turn would head the ball to either one of the central midfielders or to the striker. This was known as the Flo Pass.

He played for Stryn, Sogndal, Molde, Lierse, Sheffield United and Strømsgodset He was capped 53 times, and scored 11 goals for the Norway national team and was part of his country's squads at the 1994 and 1998 FIFA World Cups. Perhaps his most famous appearance for the national side was the World Cup match against Brazil on 23 June 1998, when he came on as a late substitute and contributed heavily to turning a 0–1 deficit to a last-gasp 2–1 upset of the reigning World Cup champions.

Flo retired after the 2002 season, having scored 120 goals in 184 games for Strømsgodset. After his playing career, he worked with marketing for the club before he filled the role of executive director from October 2004 to January 2006. He later became the director of football of Strømsgodset.

== Personal life ==
Flo is from a family of footballers; he is the younger brother of Kjell Rune Flo, who also played for Molde, and the older brother of Tore André Flo. who played for Chelsea and Rangers, and Jarle Flo who played for Norwegian side Sogndal. Håvard Flo (who played for Sogndal, AGF, Werder Bremen and Wolverhampton Wanderers) is his cousin. In addition, Ulrik Flo is his nephew.

Jostein Flo was a decent high jumper in his younger days, and has a personal best jump of 2.06 metres from 1983 (2.08 m indoor from 1987).

== Career statistics ==
=== Club ===
Appearances and goals by club, season and competition
Season	Club	Division	League		National Cup		League Cup		Europe		Total	
Season	Club	Division	Apps	Goals	Apps	Goals	Apps	Goals	Apps	Goals	Apps	Goals
Molde	1987	Norwegian First Division	19	2			—		—		19	2
Molde	1988	Norwegian First Division	22	10			—		—		22	10
Molde	1989	Norwegian First Division	21	12			—		—		21	12
Molde	1990	Tippeligaen	10	2			—		—		10	2
Molde	Total		72	26			0	0	0	0	72	26
Lierse	1990–91	Belgian First Division	25	7			—		—		25	7
Sogndal	1991	Tippeligaen	10	7			—		—		10	7
Sogndal	1992	Tippeligaen	22	9	3	3	—		—		25	12
Sogndal	Total		32	16	3	3	0	0	0	0	35	19
Sheffield United	1993–94	Premier League	33	9	1	0	1	0	—		35	9
Sheffield United	1994–95	Football League First Division	32	6	1	0	2	2	—		35	8
Sheffield United	1995–96	Football League First Division	19	4	0	0	—		—		19	4
Sheffield United	Total		84	19	2	0	3	2	0	0	89	21
Strømsgodset	1996	Tippeligaen	18	6			—		—		18	6
Strømsgodset	1997	Tippeligaen	21	14			—		—		21	14
Strømsgodset	1998	Tippeligaen	19	19			—		—		19	19
Strømsgodset	1999	Tippeligaen	25	19	2	1	—		—		27	20
Strømsgodset	2000	Norwegian First Division	26	25	1	0	—		—		27	25
Strømsgodset	2001	Tippeligaen	26	15	3	0	—		—		29	15
Strømsgodset	2002	Norwegian First Division	26	12	3	2	—		—		29	14
Strømsgodset	Total		161	110	9	3	0	0	0	0	170	113
Career total			374	178	14	6	3	2	0	0	391	186
