= List of Eliteserien hat-tricks =

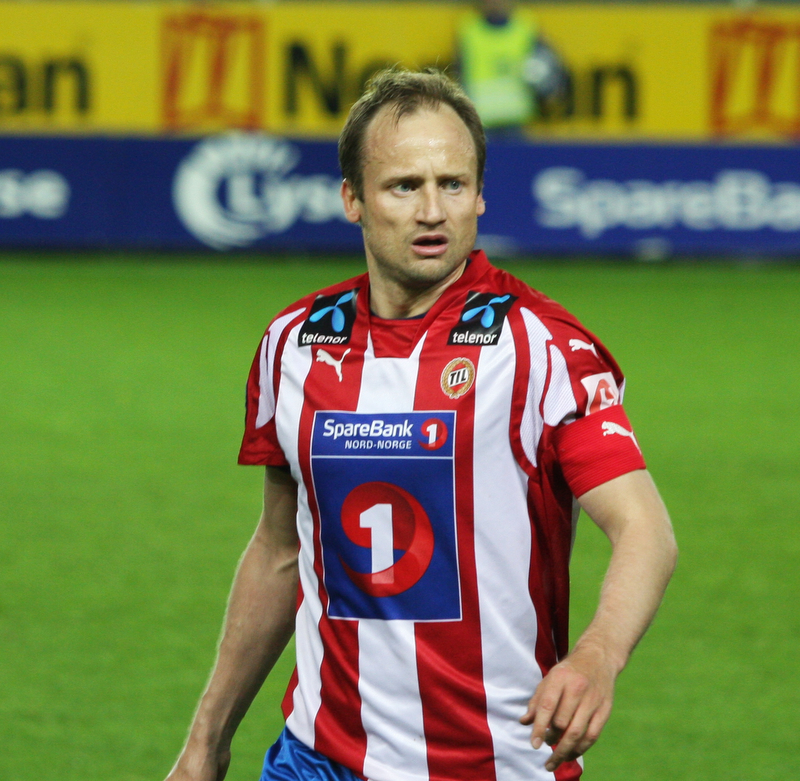
Sigurd Rushfeldt scored a record 11 Eliteserien hat-tricks, for Tromsø and Rosenborg.

Since the inception of the football one-group Norwegian top-flight league competition, Eliteserien, in 1963, a number of players have scored three goals (a hat-trick) or more in a single match.

Sigurd Rushfeldt has scored three or more goals eleven times in Eliteserien, more than any other player. Petter Belsvik has scored ten; Stig Johansen and Bengt Sæternes have scored seven hat-tricks each. Belsvik (HamKam, Molde, Rosenborg, Stabæk and Start) is the only player to have scored hat-tricks for five different clubs. Five players have scored hat-tricks and still ended up on the losing side: Jostein Flo, Steffen Iversen, Björn Bergmann Sigurðarson, Bengt Sæternes and Anthony Ujah.

Two players have scored a double hat-trick (6 goals) in a match; Odd Iversen and Jan Fuglset. Kenneth Nysæther, Harald Martin Brattbakk and Thorstein Helstad have scored five goals in a match. Erik Karlsen holds the record for the quickest Norwegian top division hat-trick, netting three times for Lillestrøm against Mjøndalen in 2 minutes 30 seconds.

The 1996 season holds the record for the most hat-tricks in a season, with twenty.

== Hat-tricks ==
This list show all players who have scored three goals or more in a single match from the start of the 1989 season and onwards.

This list is under construction.

As of matches played 27 May 2024

Key
| ^{4} | Player scored four goals |
| ^{5} | Player scored five goals |
| | Player's team lost the match |
| | Player's team drew the match |
| * | The home team |

Note: The results column shows the home team score first

| Player | Nationality | For | Against | Result | Date | Ref |
|---|---|---|---|---|---|---|
| Mike McCabe | Ireland | Tromsø | Brann* | 0–3 | 7 May 1989 | |
| Karl-Petter Løken^{4} | Norway | Rosenborg* | Mjølner | 6–2 | 16 May 1989 | |
| Petter Belsvik | Norway | Molde* | Vålerengen | 5–0 | 18 June 1989 | |
| Stein Berg-Johansen | Norway | Mjølner* | Moss | 3–1 | 18 June 1989 | |
| Kjell Ove Olofsson | Sweden | Moss | Vålerengen* | 1–5 | 20 August 1989 | |
| Jahn Ivar Jakobsen | Norway | Rosenborg* | Brann | 4–0 | 24 September 1989 | |
| Jostein Flo^{4} | Norway | Molde* | Mjølner | 7–0 | 1 October 1989 | |
| Stein Berg-Johansen | Norway | Mjølner* | Sogndal | 3–3 | 8 October 1989 | |
| Jahn Ivar Jakobsen | Norway | Rosenborg* | Strømsgodset | 6–3 | 16 May 1990 | |
| Tore André Dahlum | Norway | Start | Strømsgodset* | 1–5 | 24 June 1990 | |
| Per Hilmar Nybø | Norway | Brann* | Strømsgodset | 5–2 | 22 July 1990 | |
| Geir Frigård^{4} | Norway | Lillestrøm* | Moss | 4–0 | 22 July 1990 | |
| Mike McCabe | Ireland | Tromsø* | Kongsvinger | 3–1 | 5 August 1990 | |
| Tore André Dahlum | Norway | Start* | Viking | 3–2 | 26 August 1990 | |
| Jahn Ivar Jakobsen | Norway | Rosenborg* | Start | 4–1 | 23 September 1990 | |
| Petter Belsvik | Norway | Molde* | Rosenborg | 4–1 | 4 May 1991 | |
| Odd Johnsen | Norway | Strømsgodset | Molde* | 0–7 | 9 June 1991 | |
| Tore André Dahlum | Norway | Start* | Viking | 4–1 | 7 July 1991 | |
| Gøran Sørloth | Norway | Rosenborg* | Brann | 4–0 | 4 August 1991 | |
| Karl-Petter Løken | Norway | Rosenborg* | Sogndal | 6–2 | 18 August 1991 | |
| Tom Fodstad^{4} | Norway | Lyn | Viking* | 3–4 | 29 September 1991 | |
| Frank Strandli^{4} | Norway | Start* | Sogndal | 4–1 | 26 April 1992 | |
| Kjell Roar Kaasa | Norway | Kongsvinger* | Sogndal | 5–0 | 8 June 1992 | |
| Kenneth Nysæther | Norway | Lillestrøm | Mjøndalen* | 0–4 | 14 June 1992 | |
| Ole Bjørn Sundgot | Norway | Molde* | HamKam | 4–1 | 23 August 1992 | |
| Stuart McManus | Scotland | Lillestrøm | HamKam* | 1–4 | 27 September 1992 | |
| Jostein Flo | Norway | Sogndal | Lyn* | 7–3 | 27 September 1992 | |
| Kjell Roar Kaasa | Norway | Kongsvinger* | Molde | 3–0 | 4 October 1992 | |
| Gøran Sørloth | Norway | Rosenborg* | Kongsvinger | 6–0 | 18 October 1992 | |
| Frank Strandli | Norway | Start* | Molde | 4–0 | 23 May 1993 | |
| Egil Østenstad | Norway | Viking* | HamKam | 7–1 | 23 May 1993 | |
| Asbjørn Helgeland | Norway | Fyllingen* | Kongsvinger | 5–3 | 20 June 1993 | |
| Petter Belsvik^{4} | Norway | HamKam* | Lillestrøm | 4–3 | 20 June 1993 | |
| Kjell Roar Kaasa | Norway | Lyn* | Brann | 5–1 | 18 July 1993 | |
| Erik Hoftun^{4} | Norway | Molde* | Lyn | 6–3 | 5 September 1993 | |
| Sigurd Rushfeldt | Norway | Tromsø* | HamKam | 4–1 | 3 October 1993 | |
| Mons Ivar Mjelde^{4} | Norway | Lillestrøm* | Bodø/Glimt | 5–3 | 3 October 1993 | |
| Kaj Eskelinen | Sweden | Brann | Fyllingen* | 1–6 | 3 October 1993 | |
| Trond Egil Soltvedt | Norway | Brann | Fyllingen* | 1–6 | 3 October 1993 | |
| Mons Ivar Mjelde | Norway | Lillestrøm | Start* | 1–5 | 17 October 1993 | |
| Petter Belsvik | Norway | HamKam* | Fyllingen | 6–0 | 17 October 1993 | |
| Geir Frigård | Norway | Kongsvinger | Brann* | 0–4 | 8 May 1994 | |
| Harald Martin Brattbakk | Norway | Rosenborg* | HamKam | 6–1 | 8 May 1994 | |
| Rolf Inge Furuly | Norway | HamKam* | Sogndal* | 3–2 | 29 May 1994 | |
| Harald Martin Brattbakk | Norway | Rosenborg | Strømsgodset* | 0–7 | 24 July 1994 | |
| Dag Riisnæs | Norway | Kongsvinger* | HamKam | 5–1 | 24 July 1994 | |
| Tore André Dahlum | Norway | Start* | Strømsgodset | 7–0 | 7 August 1994 | |
| Harald Martin Brattbakk | Norway | Rosenborg* | Brann | 9–0 | 21 September 1994 | |
| Petter Belsvik | Norway | Start | Bodø/Glimt* | 0–6 | 25 September 1994 | |
| Ole Gunnar Solskjær | Norway | Molde* | Viking | 5–4 | 29 April 1995 | |
| Ole Gunnar Solskjær | Norway | Molde* | Hødd | 7–2 | 16 May 1995 | |
| Arild Stavrum | Norway | Molde* | Hødd | 7–2 | 16 May 1995 | |
| Petter Belsvik^{4} | Norway | Start | Strindheim* | 2–6 | 21 May 1995 | |
| Ståle Solbakken | Norway | Lillestrøm* | Hødd | 6–0 | 30 July 1995 | |
| Andreas Lund^{4} | Norway | Start* | Kongsvinger | 6–2 | 6 August 1995 | |
| Sigurd Rushfeldt | Norway | Tromsø* | Kongsvinger | 8–0 | 27 August 1995 | |
| Kristian Hoem Sørli | Norway | Strindheim | Start* | 4–6 | 2 September 1995 | |
| Tore André Flo | Norway | Tromsø | Molde* | 0–7 | 2 September 1995 | |
| Steffen Iversen | Norway | Rosenborg* | HamKam | 9–1 | 2 September 1995 | |
| Harald Martin Brattbakk | Norway | Rosenborg* | HamKam | 9–1 | 2 September 1995 | |
| Kenneth Nysæther^{5} | Norway | Vålerenga* | Strindheim | 9–2 | 24 September 1995 | |
| Stig Johansen | Norway | Bodø/Glimt* | Viking | 6–2 | 22 October 1995 | |
| Tore André Flo | Norway | Tromsø* | HamKam | 4–1 | 22 October 1995 | |
| Ole Gunnar Solskjær | Norway | Molde* | Moss | 8–0 | 21 April 1996 | |
| Arild Stavrum | Norway | Molde* | Moss | 8–0 | 21 April 1996 | |
| Harald Martin Brattbakk^{5} | Norway | Rosenborg* | Brann | 10–0 | 5 May 1996 | |
| Jahn Ivar Jakobsen | Norway | Rosenborg* | Brann | 10–0 | 5 May 1996 | |
| Egil Østenstad | Norway | Viking | Lillestrøm* | 0–4 | 5 May 1996 | |
| Børre Meinseth | Norway | Viking* | Start | 4–0 | 16 May 1996 | |
| Ole Martin Årst | Norway | Tromsø* | Brann | 4–1 | 7 July 1996 | |
| Sigurd Rushfeldt^{4} | Norway | Tromsø | Start* | 1–4 | 4 August 1996 | |
| Kjetil Løvvik | Norway | Vålerenga* | Moss | 4–1 | 11 August 1996 | |
| Stig Johansen | Norway | Bodø/Glimt* | Kongsvinger | 5–3 | 11 August 1996 | |
| Dagfinn Enerly | Norway | Skeid | Tromsø* | 2–4 | 11 August 1996 | |
| Espen Musæus^{4} | Norway | Vålerenga | Start* | 2–4 | 19 August 1996 | |
| Mons Ivar Mjelde^{4} | Norway | Brann* | Start | 7–1 | 25 August 1996 | |
| Mons Ivar Mjelde^{4} | Norway | Brann | Skeid* | 1–6 | 4 September 1996 | |
| Egil Østenstad | Norway | Viking* | Skeid | 7–0 | 8 September 1996 | |
| Tore André Flo | Norway | Brann* | Strømsgodset | 6–2 | 8 September 1996 | |
| Stig Johansen | Norway | Bodø/Glimt* | Vålerenga | 3–0 | 15 September 1996 | |
| Ole Bjørn Sundgot | Norway | Molde* | Brann | 3–3 | 13 October 1996 | |
| Stig Johansen | Norway | Bodø/Glimt* | Viking | 7–0 | 13 October 1996 | |
| Krister Isaksen | Norway | Strømsgodset | Start* | 2–6 | 20 October 1996 | |
| Jostein Flo | Norway | Strømsgodset* | Skeid | 4–0 | 13 April 1997 | |
| Mons Ivar Mjelde | Norway | Brann* | Bodø/Glimt | 3–1 | 20 April 1997 | |
| Stig Johansen | Norway | Bodø/Glimt* | Kongsvinger | 4–0 | 8 May 1997 | |
| Sigurd Rushfeldt | Norway | Rosenborg | Strømsgodset* | 1–5 | 1 June 1997 | |
| Sigurd Rushfeldt | Norway | Rosenborg* | Skeid | 5–1 | 15 June 1997 | |
| Frank Strandli | Norway | Lillestrøm | Lyn* | 0–4 | 2 July 1997 | |
| Jerry Månsson | Sweden | Viking* | Skeid | 4–0 | 6 July 1997 | |
| Tore André Flo | Norway | Brann* | Strømsgodset | 4–1 | 13 July 1997 | |
| Stig Johansen | Norway | Bodø/Glimt* | Tromsø | 5–1 | 27 July 1997 | |
| Odd Inge Olsen | Norway | Molde | Brann* | 0–4 | 3 August 1997 | |
| Rune Hagen | Norway | Strømsgodset* | Kongsvinger | 8–0 | 10 August 1997 | |
| Lasse Olsen | Norway | Strømsgodset* | Lyn | 6–1 | 31 August 1997 | |
| Jörgen Wålemark | Sweden | Lillestrøm | Tromsø* | 1–3 | 13 September 1997 | |
| Sigurd Rushfeldt | Norway | Rosenborg* | Strømsgodset | 6–1 | 4 October 1997 | |
| Mons Ivar Mjelde | Norway | Brann | Lyn | 1–5 | 5 October 1997 | |
| Sigurd Rushfeldt^{4} | Norway | Rosenborg* | Moss | 6–0 | 16 May 1998 | |
| Bjørn Viljugrein | Norway | Vålerenga* | Sogndal | 4–0 | 1 July 1998 | |
| Morten Berre | Norway | Haugesund* | Moss | 5–1 | 9 July 1998 | |
| Bengt Sæternes | Norway | Bodø/Glimt* | Strømsgodset | 6–2 | 30 July 1998 | |
| Petter Belsvik | Norway | Stabæk | Kongsvinger* | 1–5 | 2 August 1998 | |
| Mamadou Diallo^{4} | Senegal | Lillestrøm | Vålerenga* | 1–5 | 2 August 1998 | |
| Jostein Flo^{4} | Norway | Strømsgodset* | Haugesund | 4–1 | 16 August 1998 | |
| Sigurd Rushfeldt^{4} | Norway | Rosenborg | Kongsvinger* | 2–8 | 9 September 1998 | |
| Kjetil Løvvik | Norway | Brann | Viking* | 2–3 | 12 September 1998 | |
| Jo Tessem | Norway | Molde | Tromsø* | 2–6 | 4 October 1998 | |
| Martin Andresen | Norway | Stabæk | Sogndal* | 0–9 | 25 October 1998 | |
| Petter Belsvik | Norway | Stabæk | Sogndal* | 0–9 | 25 October 1998 | |
| Sigurd Rushfeldt | Norway | Rosenborg* | Moss | 5–0 | 11 April 1999 | |
| Tore André Dahlum | Norway | Rosenborg* | Bodø/Glimt | 6–1 | 8 May 1999 | |
| André Schei Lindbæk | Norway | Skeid* | Lillestrøm | 4–4 | 16 May 1999 | |
| Andreas Lund | Norway | Molde* | Moss | 3–1 | 20 June 1999 | |
| Heidar Helguson^{4} | Iceland | Lillestrøm | Stabæk* | 1–6 | 1 August 1999 | |
| John Carew^{4} | Norway | Rosenborg | Skeid* | 1–7 | 19 September 1999 | |
| Petter Belsvik | Norway | Stabæk | Brann* | 2–3 | 13 October 1999 | |
| Bengt Sæternes | Norway | Bodø/Glimt | Moss* | 1–6 | 2 August 2000 | |
| Arild Sundgot | Norway | Lillestrøm* | Tromsø | 6–0 | 13 August 2000 | |
| Trond Fredrik Ludvigsen | Norway | Bodø/Glimt* | Lillestrøm | 3–0 | 20 August 2000 | |
| Bernt Hulsker | Norway | Molde* | Bodø/Glimt | 7–1 | 27 August 2000 | |
| Magne Hoseth | Norway | Molde | Vålerenga* | 1–5 | 10 September 2000 | |
| Petter Belsvik | Norway | Rosenborg* | Bryne | 9–0 | 15 October 2000 | |
| Thorstein Helstad^{5} | Norway | Brann | Strømsgodset* | 2–6 | 2 May 2001 | |
| Bernt Hulsker | Norway | Molde* | Bryne | 5–0 | 6 May 2001 | |
| Roar Strand | Norway | Rosenborg* | Strømsgodset | 4–0 | 16 May 2001 | |
| Roar Fredriksen | Norway | Sogndal | Bryne* | 2–3 | 17 June 2001 | |
| Magnus Powell^{4} | Sweden | Lillestrøm* | Strømsgodset* | 7–4 | 22 July 2001 | |
| Trond Fredrik Ludvigsen | Norway | Bodø/Glimt | Odd* | 0–5 | 22 July 2001 | |
| Jan-Åge Fjørtoft | Norway | Stabæk* | Bryne | 4–0 | 22 July 2001 | |
| Sigurd Rushfeldt | Norway | Rosenborg* | Moss | 6–0 | 4 August 2001 | |
| Magne Hoseth | Norway | Molde | Sogndal* | 3–4 | 26 August 2001 | |
| Trond Fredrik Ludvigsen | Norway | Bodø/Glimt | Strømsgodset* | 1–4 | 14 October 2001 | |
| Martin Wiig | Norway | Odd | Bryne* | 1–3 | 21 October 2001 | |
| Frode Johnsen | Norway | Rosenborg | Brann* | 2–6 | 28 October 2001 | |
| Bengt Sæternes | Norway | Bodø/Glimt | Rosenborg* | 4–3 | 2 June 2002 | |
| Trygve Nygaard | Norway | Viking* | Brann | 4–1 | 2 June 2002 | |
| Pierre Gallo | Sweden | Bryne* | Sogndal | 3–0 | 18 August 2002 | |
| Ríkharður Daðason | Iceland | Lillestrøm* | Start | 7–0 | 25 August 2002 | |
| Magne Hoseth | Norway | Molde* | Lillestrøm | 4–0 | 21 April 2003 | |
| Kim-Rune Hellesund | Norway | Bryne* | Tromsø | 6–1 | 1 June 2003 | |
| Edwin van Ankeren | Netherlands | Odd* | Lillestrøm | 5–0 | 29 June 2003 | |
| Robbie Winters | Scotland | Brann* | Aalesund | 3–0 | 10 August 2003 | |
| Espen Hoff | Norway | Odd | Vålerenga* | 0–3 | 24 August 2003 | |
| Aasmund Bjørkan | Norway | Bodø/Glimt | Stabæk* | 2–5 | 9 May 2004 | |
| Christian Flindt Bjerg | Denmark | Odd* | Lillestrøm | 3–2 | 20 May 2004 | |
| Geir Frigård | Norway | HamKam* | Molde | 5–1 | 13 June 2004 | |
| Arild Sundgot | Norway | Lillestrøm | Brann* | 1–5 | 27 June 2004 | |
| Arild Sundgot | Norway | Lillestrøm* | Viking | 5–1 | 25 July 2004 | |
| Bengt Sæternes | Norway | Brann* | Lyn | 5–1 | 26 September 2004 | |
| Frode Johnsen | Norway | Rosenborg* | Lyn | 4–1 | 30 October 2004 | |
| Bengt Sæternes | Norway | Brann* | Lillestrøm | 6–2 | 16 May 2005 | |
| Charlie Miller | Scotland | Brann* | Rosenborg | 4–1 | 19 June 2005 | |
| Stig Johansen^{4} | Norway | Bodø/Glimt* | Odd | 5–1 | 3 August 2005 | |
| Todi Jónsson | Faroe Islands | Start* | Rosenborg | 5–2 | 13 August 2005 | |
| Ole Martin Årst | Norway | Tromsø* | Start | 3–1 | 2 October 2005 | |
| Daniel Nannskog | Sweden | Stabæk* | Molde | 8–0 | 29 October 2006 | |
| Peter Ijeh^{4} | Nigeria | Viking* | Brann | 5–0 | 5 November 2006 | |
| Bengt Sæternes^{4} | Norway | Brann* | Vålerenga | 4–1 | 22 April 2007 | |
| Péter Kovács | Hungary | Strømsgodset | Start* | 2–3 | 25 May 2007 | |
| Stefán Gíslason | Iceland | Lyn* | Brann | 6–0 | 16 June 2007 | |
| Thorstein Helstad | Norway | Brann* | Stabæk | 3–0 | 22 July 2007 | |
| Thorstein Helstad | Norway | Brann | Strømsgodset* | 2–4 | 29 July 2007 | |
| Arild Sundgot | Norway | Lillestrøm* | Aalesund | 7–0 | 26 August 2007 | |
| Veigar Páll Gunnarsson | Iceland | Stabæk | Odd* | 1–5 | 16 September 2007 | |
| Steffen Iversen | Norway | Rosenborg | Fredrikstad* | 4–3 | 30 September 2007 | |
| Daniel Nannskog^{4} | Sweden | Stabæk* | Tromsø | 5–0 | 28 October 2007 | |
| Thorstein Helstad^{4} | Norway | Brann* | Viking | 5–2 | 28 October 2007 | |
| Morten Moldskred | Norway | Tromsø* | Brann | 3–0 | 3 November 2007 | |
| Thorstein Helstad | Norway | Brann* | Fredrikstad | 4–2 | 30 March 2008 | |
| Tor Hogne Aarøy | Norway | Aalesund* | HamKam | 5–0 | 20 April 2008 | |
| Espen Hoff | Norway | Lyn | Aalesund* | 4–0 | 4 May 2008 | |
| Thorstein Helstad | Norway | Brann* | Bodø/Glimt | 4–1 | 5 July 2008 | |
| Daniel Nannskog^{4} | Sweden | Stabæk* | Strømsgodset | 6–0 | 14 September 2008 | |
| Pape Paté Diouf | Senegal | Molde | Tromsø* | 4–4 | 18 October 2008 | |
| Veigar Páll Gunnarsson | Iceland | Stabæk* | Vålerenga | 6–2 | 26 October 2008 | |
| Trond Olsen | Norway | Bodø/Glimt | Rosenborg* | 1–3 | 2 November 2008 | |
| Daniel Nannskog | Sweden | Stabæk* | Odd | 3–3 | 5 April 2009 | |
| Mame Biram Diouf^{4} | Senegal | Molde* | Brann | 5–2 | 12 July 2009 | |
| Magne Hoseth | Norway | Molde* | Start | 8–1 | 1 August 2009 | |
| Rade Prica | Sweden | Rosenborg* | Lyn | 4–1 | 31 August 2009 | |
| Erik Huseklepp | Norway | Brann* | Odd | 4–2 | 28 September 2009 | |
| Martin Fillo | Czech Republic | Viking* | Odd | 3–1 | 4 July 2010 | |
| Veigar Páll Gunnarsson | Iceland | Stabæk* | Molde | 4–3 | 5 July 2010 | |
| Steffen Iversen | Norway | Rosenborg* | Haugesund | 4–3 | 1 August 2010 | |
| Mohammed Abdellaoue | Norway | Vålerenga* | Start | 8–1 | 2 August 2010 | |
| Ole Martin Årst | Norway | Start* | Strømsgodset | 4–2 | 19 September 2010 | |
| Kayke | Brazil | Tromsø | Sandefjord* | 3–5 | 19 September 2010 | |
| Torgeir Børven^{4} | Norway | Odd* | Sandefjord | 5–0 | 26 September 2010 | |
| Anthony Ujah | Nigeria | Lillestrøm | Strømsgodset* | 5–4 | 7 November 2010 | |
| Malick Mané | Senegal | Sandefjord* | Hønefoss | 6–1 | 7 November 2010 | |
| Anthony Ujah^{4} | Nigeria | Lillestrøm | Stabæk* | 0–7 | 20 March 2011 | |
| Rade Prica^{4} | Sweden | Rosenborg* | Lillestrøm | 4–4 | 10 April 2011 | |
| Sigurd Rushfeldt | Norway | Tromsø* | Brann | 4–0 | 29 May 2011 | |
| Ole Martin Årst | Norway | Start* | Fredrikstad | 3–2 | 16 June 2011 | |
| Bengt Sæternes | Norway | Viking* | Brann | 3–0 | 16 June 2011 | |
| Pape Paté Diouf^{4} | Senegal | Molde* | Aalesund | 5–2 | 3 July 2011 | |
| Celso Borges | Costa Rica | Fredrikstad* | Brann | 4–2 | 18 July 2011 | |
| Alexander Søderlund | Norway | Haugesund | Start* | 1–4 | 8 August 2011 | |
| Håvard Storbæk | Norway | Odd* | Viking | 4–2 | 19 August 2011 | |
| John Chibuike | Nigeria | Rosenborg* | Start | 4–1 | 19 September 2011 | |
| Chukwuma Akabueze | Nigeria | Brann | Lillestrøm* | 3–4 | 13 May 2012 | |
| Björn Bergmann Sigurdarson | Iceland | Lillestrøm* | Brann | 3–4 | 13 May 2012 | |
| Nikola Djurdjic | Bosnia-Herzegovina | Haugesund* | Aalesund | 4–2 | 16 May 2012 | |
| Ola Kamara | Norway | Strømsgodset | Rosenborg* | 3–3 | 24 June 2012 | |
| Håvard Nielsen | Norway | Vålerenga | Odd* | 2–3 | 11 July 2012 | |
| Daniel Chima Chukwu | Nigeria | Molde* | Stabæk | 4–3 | 30 September 2012 | |
| Abderrazak Hamdallah | Morocco | Aalesund* | Lillestrøm | 7–1 | 13 May 2013 | |
| Christian Gytkjær | Denmark | Haugesund | Molde* | 1–5 | 16 May 2013 | |
| Nicki Bille Nielsen | Denmark | Rosenborg* | Sarpsborg 08 | 4–2 | 16 May 2013 | |
| Bård Finne | Norway | Brann* | Sandnes Ulf | 6–1 | 29 June 2013 | |
| Ola Kamara | Norway | Strømsgodset* | Hønefoss | 6–1 | 28 July 2013 | |
| Matthías Vilhjálmsson | Iceland | Start* | Sandnes Ulf | 7–0 | 1 September 2013 | |
| Frode Johnsen | Norway | Odd* | Aalesund | 5–1 | 22 September 2013 | |
| Ola Kamara | Norway | Strømsgodset | Sogndal* | 0–5 | 27 September 2013 | |
| Abderrazak Hamdallah | Morocco | Aalesund | Viking* | 1–3 | 25 October 2013 | |
| Marius Helle | Norway | Sandnes Ulf* | Brann | 3–1 | 3 November 2013 | |
| Christian Gytkjær | Denmark | Haugesund | Brann* | 1–3 | 30 April 2014 | |
| Mohamed Elyounoussi | Norway | Molde* | Brann | 4–2 | 9 June 2014 | |
| Tommy Høiland | Norway | Molde* | Sandnes Ulf | 3–1 | 20 July 2014 | |
| Viðar Örn Kjartansson | Iceland | Vålerenga | Viking* | 5–5 | 2 August 2014 | |
| Viðar Örn Kjartansson | Iceland | Vålerenga* | Haugesund | 4–1 | 14 September 2014 | |
| Pálmi Rafn Pálmason | Iceland | Lillestrøm* | Start | 4–1 | 26 October 2014 | |
| Fred Friday | Nigeria | Lillestrøm | Mjøndalen* | 1–4 | 30 April 2015 | |
| Tommy Høiland | Norway | Molde* | Start | 4–0 | 10 May 2015 | |
| Adama Diomande | Norway | Stabæk* | Sandefjord | 4–0 | 13 May 2015 | |
| Mohamed Elyounoussi | Norway | Molde* | Sandefjord | 6–1 | 30 May 2015 | |
| Ola Kamara | Norway | Molde | Sarpsborg 08* | 1–4 | 3 July 2015 | |
| Christian Gytkjær | Denmark | Haugesund* | Lillestrøm | 3–3 | 4 July 2015 | |
| Christian Gytkjær | Denmark | Haugesund* | Aalesund | 3–1 | 9 August 2015 | |
| Alexander Sørloth^{4} | Norway | Bodø/Glimt* | Start | 5–1 | 9 August 2015 | |
| Marcus Pedersen | Norway | Strømsgodset | Mjøndalen* | 2–4 | 30 August 2015 | |
| Alexander Sørloth | Norway | Bodø/Glimt* | Stabæk | 6–1 | 8 November 2015 | |
| Fredrik Nordkvelle | Norway | Odd* | Lillestrøm | 5–0 | 8 November 2015 | |
| Kristoffer Tokstad | Norway | Sarpsborg 08 | Start* | 1–4 | 21 April 2016 | |
| Mostafa Abdellaoue | Norway | Aalesund* | Tromsø | 6–0 | 24 April 2016 | |
| Christian Gytkjær | Denmark | Rosenborg | Lillestrøm* | 3–4 | 6 August 2016 | |
| Espen Ruud | Norway | Odd | Lillestrøm* | 2–4 | 11 September 2016 | |
| Ohi Omoijuanfo | Norway | Stabæk* | Aalesund | 3–1 | 2 April 2017 | |
| Ohi Omoijuanfo | Norway | Stabæk* | Sarpsborg 08 | 3–0 | 17 April 2017 | |
| Gilbert Koomson | Ghana | Sogndal* | Viking | 4–0 | 13 May 2017 | |
| Erling Knudtzon | Norway | Lillestrøm* | Tromsø | 4–1 | 28 May 2017 | |
| Lars Veldwijk | South Africa | Aalesund* | Odd | 5–1 | 25 June 2017 | |
| Benjamin Stokke | Norway | Kristiansund | Stabæk* | 1–4 | 25 June 2017 | |
| Simen Juklerød | Norway | Vålerenga | Viking* | 1–7 | 22 October 2017 | |
| Mostafa Abdellaoue | Norway | Aalesund* | Strømsgodset | 4–3 | 26 November 2017 | |
| Marcus Pedersen | Norway | Strømsgodset* | Odd | 3–0 | 15 April 2018 | |
| Erling Haaland^{4} | Norway | Molde | Brann* | 0–4 | 1 July 2018 | |
| Bendik Bye | Norway | Kristiansund | Strømsgodset* | 2–3 | 9 July 2018 | |
| Amor Layouni | Sweden | Bodø/Glimt* | Lillestrøm | 4–0 | 5 May 2019 | |
| Ohi Omoijuanfo | Norway | Molde* | Viking | 5–1 | 20 May 2019 | |
| Ibrahima Wadji | Senegal | Haugesund | Mjøndalen* | 1–4 | 26 May 2019 | |
| Leke James | Nigeria | Molde | Strømsgodset* | 0–4 | 22 June 2019 | |
| Erik Botheim | Norway | Rosenborg* | Tromsø | 5–2 | 10 August 2019 | |
| Amahl Pellegrino | Norway | Kristiansund* | Viking | 4–2 | 27 October 2019 | |
| Kasper Junker | Denmark | Stabæk* | Mjøndalen | 4–2 | 24 November 2019 | |
| Kasper Junker | Denmark | Bodø/Glimt* | Haugesund | 6–1 | 21 June 2020 | |
| Amahl Pellegrino | Norway | Kristiansund* | Aalesund | 7–2 | 21 June 2020 | |
| Torgeir Børven | Norway | Odd* | Vålerenga | 4–1 | 24 June 2020 | |
| Kasper Junker | Denmark | Bodø/Glimt* | Brann | 5–0 | 5 July 2020 | |
| Vidar Örn Kjartansson | Iceland | Vålerenga* | Brann | 5–1 | 13 September 2020 | |
| Daouda Bamba | Ivory Coast | Brann* | Aalesund | 3–1 | 28 November 2020 | |
| Mushaga Bakenga | Norway | Kristiansund | Odd* | 4–3 | 9 December 2020 | |
| Kasper Junker | Denmark | Bodø/Glimt | Haugesund* | 0–4 | 9 December 2020 | |
| Lars-Jørgen Salvesen | Norway | Strømsgodset | Odd* | 1–3 | 19 December 2020 | |
| Ibrahima Wadji | Senegal | Haugesund | Kristiansund* | 1–3 | 22 December 2020 | |
| Ohi Omoijuanfo | Norway | Molde* | Brann | 4–0 | 16 May 2021 | |
| Kristoffer Zachariassen | Norway | Rosenborg* | Brann | 3–2 | 20 May 2021 | |
| Mushaga Bakenga | Norway | Odd | Brann* | 1–3 | 20 June 2021 | |
| Ohi Omoijuanfo | Norway | Molde* | Haugesund | 5–4 | 8 August 2021 | |
| Tobias Lauritsen | Norway | Odd* | Haugesund | 4–2 | 15 August 2021 | |
| Amahl Pellegrino | Norway | Bodø/Glimt* | Kristiansund | 3–0 | 22 August 2021 | |
| Ibrahima Koné^{4} | Mali | Sarpsborg 08* | Sandefjord | 5–0 | 29 August 2021 | |
| Alioune Ndour | Senegal | Haugesund* | Mjøndalen | 7–0 | 17 October 2021 | |
| Veton Berisha | Norway | Viking* | Lillestrøm | 5–1 | 23 October 2021 | |
| Moses Mawa | Norway | Kristiansund | Odd* | 2–4 | 7 November 2021 | |
| Thomas Lehne Olsen | Norway | Lillestrøm* | Strømsgodset | 4–1 | 27 November 2021 | |
| Alexander Ruud Tveter | Norway | Sandefjord | Haugesund* | 1–3 | 3 April 2022 | |
| Mohamed Ofkir | Norway | Sandefjord | Strømsgodset* | 0–5 | 23 April 2022 | |
| Veton Berisha | Norway | Viking* | Haugesund | 5–1 | 30 April 2022 | |
| Ole Sæter | Norway | Rosenborg* | Kristiansund | 3–1 | 25 June 2022 | |
| Samual Rogers | USA | Rosenborg* | Jerv | 3–2 | 10 July 2022 | |
| Amahl Pellegrino | Norway | Bodø/Glimt* | Jerv | 5–0 | 24 July 2022 | |
| Hugo Vetlesen | Norway | Bodø/Glimt* | Odd | 7–0 | 6 August 2022 | |
| Casper Tengstedt | Denmark | Rosenborg | Sandefjord* | 2–5 | 12 August 2022 | |
| Tobias Heintz | Norway | Sarpsborg 08* | Jerv | 4–3 | 18 September 2022 | |
| Amahl Pellegrino | Norway | Bodø/Glimt* | Stabæk | 4–0 | 16 April 2023 | |
| Akor Adams | Nigeria | Lillestrøm* | Stabæk | 3–1 | 4 June 2023 | |
| Eric Kitolano | Norway | Molde* | Sarpsborg 08 | 5–1 | 22 July 2023 | |
| Amahl Pellegrino^{4} | Norway | Bodø/Glimt* | Vålerenga | 4–2 | 24 September 2023 | |
| Jo Inge Berget | Norway | Sarpsborg 08* | Rosenborg | 5–2 | 8 October 2023 | |
| Henrik Meister^{4} | Denmark | Sarpsborg 08* | Rosenborg | 4–1 | 12 July 2024 | |
| Sverre Nypan | Norway | Rosenborg* | Lillestrøm | 4–0 | 21 August 2024 | |

== Multiple hat-tricks ==
The following table lists the minimum number of hat-tricks scored by players who have scored two or more hat-tricks.

Players in bold are still active in the Eliteserien.

| Rank | Player | Hat-tricks | Last hat-trick |
|---|---|---|---|
| 1 | (Norway) Sigurd Rushfeldt | 11 | 29 May 2011 |
| 2 | (Norway) Petter Belsvik | 10 | 15 October 2000 |
| 3 | (Norway) Stig Johansen | 7 | 3 August 2005 |
| 3 | (Norway) Bengt Sæternes | 7 | 16 June 2011 |
| 5 | (Norway) Thorstein Helstad | 6 | 5 July 2008 |
| 5 | (Norway) Mons Ivar Mjelde | 6 | 20 April 1997 |
| 5 | (Norway) Amahl Pellegrino | 6 | 24 September 2023 |
| 8 | (Norway) Harald Martin Brattbakk | 5 | 5 May 1996 |
| 8 | (Norway) Tore André "Totto" Dahlum | 5 | 8 May 1999 |
| 8 | (Denmark) Christian Gytkjær | 5 | 6 August 2016 |
| 8 | (Norway) Ohi Omoijuanfo | 5 | 8 August 2021 |
| 12 | (Norway) Jostein Flo | 4 | 16 August 1998 |
| 12 | (Norway) Tore André Flo | 4 | 13 July 1997 |
| 12 | (Norway) Magne Hoseth | 4 | 29 May 2011 |
| 12 | (Norway) Jahn Ivar "Mini" Jakobsen | 4 | 5 May 1996 |
| 12 | (Denmark) Kasper Junker | 4 | 9 December 2020 |
| 12 | (Norway) Ola Kamara | 4 | 3 July 2015 |
| 12 | (Sweden) Daniel Nannskog | 4 | 14 September 2008 |
| 12 | (Norway) Arild Sundgot | 4 | 26 August 2007 |
| 12 | (Norway) Ole Martin Årst | 4 | 16 June 2011 |
| 21 | (Norway) Geir Frigård | 3 | 13 June 2004 |
| 21 | (Iceland) Veigar Páll Gunnarsson | 3 | 5 July 2010 |
| 21 | (Norway) Steffen Iversen | 3 | 1 August 2010 |
| 21 | (Norway) Frode Johnsen | 3 | 22 September 2013 |
| 21 | (Norway) Kjell Roar Kaasa | 3 | 18 July 1993 |
| 21 | (Iceland) Viðar Örn Kjartansson | 3 | 13 September 2020 |
| 21 | (Norway) Trond Fredrik Ludvigsen | 3 | 14 October 2001 |
| 21 | (Norway) Ole Gunnar Solskjær | 3 | 21 April 1996 |
| 21 | (Norway) Frank Strandli | 3 | 2 July 1997 |
| 21 | (Norway) Egil Østenstad | 3 | 8 September 1996 |
| 31 | (Norway) Mostafa Abdellaoue | 2 | 26 November 2017 |
| 31 | (Norway) Mushaga Bakenga | 2 | 20 June 2021 |
| 31 | (Norway) Stein Berg-Johansen | 2 | 8 October 1989 |
| 31 | (Norway) **Veton Berisha** | 2 | 30 April 2022 |
| 31 | (Norway) **Torgeir Børven** | 2 | 24 June 2020 |
| 31 | (Senegal) Pape Paté Diouf | 2 | 3 July 2011 |
| 31 | (Norway) Mohamed Elyounoussi | 2 | 30 May 2015 |
| 31 | (Morocco) Abderrazak Hamdallah | 2 | 25 October 2013 |
| 31 | (Norway) Espen Hoff | 2 | 4 May 2008 |
| 31 | (Norway) Bernt Hulsker | 2 | 6 May 2001 |
| 31 | (Norway) Tommy Høiland | 2 | 10 May 2015 |
| 31 | (Norway) Andreas Lund | 2 | 20 June 1999 |
| 31 | (Norway) Karl-Petter Løken | 2 | 18 August 1991 |
| 31 | (Norway) Kjetil Løvvik | 2 | 12 September 1998 |
| 31 | (Republic of Ireland) Mike McCabe | 2 | 5 August 1990 |
| 31 | (Norway) Kenneth Nysæther | 2 | 24 September 1995 |
| 31 | (Norway) Marcus Pedersen | 2 | 15 April 2018 |
| 31 | (Sweden) Rade Prica | 2 | 10 April 2011 |
| 31 | (Norway) Arild Stavrum | 2 | 21 April 1996 |
| 31 | (Norway) Ole Bjørn Sundgot | 2 | 13 October 1996 |
| 31 | (Norway) Alexander Sørloth | 2 | 9 August 2015 |
| 31 | (Norway) Gøran Sørloth | 2 | 18 October 1992 |
| 31 | (Nigeria) Anthony Ujah | 2 | 20 March 2011 |
| 31 | (Senegal) Ibrahima Wadji | 2 | 22 December 2020 |
