= 1987 Norwegian Football Cup final =

- Event: 1987 Norwegian Football Cup
Bryne	Brann
1	0
- After extra time
- Date: 25 October 1987
- Venue: Ullevaal Stadion, Oslo
- Referee: Kjell Nordby
- Attendance: 23,080

The 1987 Norwegian Football Cup final was the final match of the 1987 Norwegian Football Cup, the 82nd season of the Norwegian Football Cup, the premier Norwegian football cup competition organized by the Football Association of Norway (NFF). The match was played on 25 October 1987 at the Ullevaal Stadion in Oslo, and opposed two First Division sides Bryne and Brann. Bryne defeated Brann 1–0 after extra time to claim the Norwegian Cup for a first time in their history.

== Route to the final ==
Bryne			Round	Brann	
Haugar	4–0 (A)		Round 1	Fana	1–0 (A)
Ålgård	2–0 (H)		Round 2	Fyllingen	4–0 (H)
Djerv 1919	2–0 (A)		Round 3	Randaberg	1–0 (A)
Mjøndalen	2–2 aet (A)	5–2 (H)	Round 4	Strindheim	2–1 aet (H)
Aalesund	3–0 (H)		Quarterfinal	Strømmen	1–0 aet (A)
Rosenborg	3–2 (A)		Semifinal	HamKam	2–1 (H)

== Match ==
=== Details ===
25 October 1987
13:15 CEST (UTC+2)

Bryne	1–0 (a.e.t.)	Brann
Ekker 102'	Report

Ullevaal Stadion, Oslo
Attendance: 23,080
Referee: Kjell Nordby (Rygge)

Bryne:
GK	(Norway) Lars Gaute Bø
DF	(Norway) Kolbjørn Ekker
DF	(Norway) Bjørn Gulden	(substituted off) 98'
DF	(Norway) Leif Rune Salte
DF	(Norway) Roar Pedersen
MF	(Norway) Hugo Hansen
MF	(Norway) Tor Fosse
MF	(Norway) Paal Fjeldstad
MF	(Norway) Jan Madsen	(substituted off) 115'
FW	(Norway) Arne Larsen Økland
FW	(Norway) Børre Meinseth
Substitutions:
MF	(Norway) Geir Giljarhus	(substituted in) 98'
MF	(Norway) Bjarne Lodden
MF	(Norway) Kjetil Sigurdsen
FW	(Norway) Paul Folkvord	(substituted in) 115'
FW	(Norway) Stig Norheim
Coach:
(Norway) Bjarne Berntsen

Brann:
GK	(Iceland) Bjarni Sigurðsson
DF	(Norway) Hans Brandtun
DF	(Norway) Trond Nordeide
DF	(Norway) Per Egil Ahlsen
DF	(Norway) Jan Halvor Halvorsen
DF	(Norway) Lars Moldestad	(substituted off) 68'
MF	(Norway) Erik Solér
MF	(Norway) Arne Møller
MF	(Algeria) Redouane Drici	(substituted off) 91'
FW	(Norway) Odd Johnsen
FW	(Norway) Halvor Storskogen
Substitutions:
MF	(Norway) Knut Arild Løberg	(substituted in) 68'
MF	(Norway) Per Hilmar Nybø	(substituted in) 91'
Coach:
(Norway) Per Vold
