= 1988 Norwegian Football Cup final =

- Event: 1988 Norwegian Football Cup
Brann	Rosenborg
Brann	Rosenborg
2	2
- After extra time
- Date: 23 October 1988
- Venue: Ullevaal Stadion, Oslo
- Referee: Bjørn Kronborg
- Attendance: 23,500

Replay
Brann	Rosenborg
0	2
- Date: 30 October 1988
- Venue: Ullevaal Stadion, Oslo
- Referee: Thorodd Presberg
- Attendance: 23,700

The 1988 Norwegian Football Cup final was the final match of the 1988 Norwegian Football Cup, the 83rd season of the Norwegian Football Cup, the premier Norwegian football cup competition organized by the Football Association of Norway (NFF). The final was played at the Ullevaal Stadion in Oslo, and opposed two First Division sides Brann and Rosenborg. As the inaugural final match finished 2–2, the final was replayed seven days later at the same venue with the Rosenborg defeated Brann 2–0 to claim the Norwegian Cup for a fourth time in their history.

== Route to the final ==
Brann			Round	Rosenborg		
Voss	A	3–0	Round 1	Leik	A	5–0
Varegg	H	9–1	Round 2	Beitstad	H	9–0
Vard Haugesund	A	5–0	Round 3	Stjørdals/Blink	A	2–1
Strindheim	H	2–0	Round 4	Eik-Tønsberg	H	4–3
Råde	H	1–0	Quarterfinal	Molde	A	2–1 aet
Moss	A	1–0	Semifinal	Start	H	5–0

== Matches ==
=== First match details ===
23 October 1988
13:15 CEST (UTC+2)

Brann	2–2 (a.e.t.)	Rosenborg
Johnsen 87'; Torvanger 98'	Report	Sørloth 83', 95'

Ullevaal Stadion, Oslo
Attendance: 23,500
Referee: Bjørn Kronborg (Faaberg)

Brann	Rosenborg

Brann:
GK	(Iceland) Bjarni Sigurðsson
DF	(Norway) Henrik Bjørnstad
DF	(Algeria) Redouane Drici
DF	(Norway) Jan Halvor Halvorsen
DF	(Norway) Lars Moldestad
MF	(Norway) Trond Nordeide
MF	(Norway) Per Egil Ahlsen
MF	(Norway) Arne Møller
MF	(Norway) Per Hilmar Nybø	(substituted off) 115'
FW	(Norway) Odd Johnsen	(substituted off) 118'
FW	(Norway) Atle Torvanger
Substitutions:
MF	(Norway) Geir Solheim	(substituted in) 118'
FW	(Norway) Halvor Storskogen	(substituted in) 115'
Coach:
(Iceland) Teitur Þórðarson

Rosenborg:
GK	(Norway) Ola By Rise
DF	(Norway) Karl Petter Løken
DF	(Norway) Trond Sollied
DF	(Norway) Geir Olav Bøgseth
DF	(Norway) Trond Henriksen	(substituted off) 7'
MF	(Norway) Kåre Ingebrigtsen
MF	(Norway) Sverre Brandhaug
MF	(Norway) Ørjan Berg
FW	(Norway) Per Joar Hansen	(substituted off) 73'
FW	(Norway) Gøran Sørloth
FW	(Norway) Mini Jakobsen
Substitutions:
DF	(Norway) Bård Wiggen	(substituted in) 73'
FW	(Norway) Jan Egil Hansen	(substituted in) 7'
Coach:
(Norway) Nils Arne Eggen

=== Replay match details ===
30 October 1988
13:15 CET (UTC+1)

Rosenborg	2–0	Brann
Sørloth 25'; Løken 33'	Report

Ullevaal Stadion, Oslo
Attendance: 23,700
Referee: Thorodd Presberg (Strømsgodset)

Rosenborg	Brann

Rosenborg:
GK	(Norway) Ola By Rise	(substituted off) 89'
DF	(Norway) Trond Henriksen
DF	(Norway) Trond Sollied
DF	(Norway) Bård Wiggen
DF	(Norway) Jan Egil Hansen
MF	(Norway) Kåre Ingebrigtsen
MF	(Norway) Sverre Brandhaug
MF	(Norway) Ørjan Berg
MF	(Norway) Karl Petter Løken
FW	(Norway) Gøran Sørloth
FW	(Norway) Mini Jakobsen
Substitutions:
GK	(Norway) Arne Linn	(substituted in) 89'
DF	(Norway) Knut Torbjørn Eggen
MF	(Norway) Trond Sundby
Coach:
(Norway) Nils Arne Eggen

Brann:
GK	(Iceland) Bjarni Sigurðsson
DF	(Norway) Henrik Bjørnstad
DF	(Algeria) Redouane Drici
DF	(Norway) Jan Halvor Halvorsen	(substituted off) 46'
DF	(Norway) Lars Moldestad
MF	(Norway) Trond Nordeide
MF	(Norway) Per Egil Ahlsen
MF	(Norway) Arne Møller
MF	(Norway) Atle Torvanger
FW	(Norway) Per Hilmar Nybø	(substituted off) 63'
FW	(Norway) Odd Johnsen
Substitutions:
DF	(Norway) Jan Erlend Kruse	(substituted in) 46'
MF	(Norway) Geir Solheim	(substituted in) 63'
Coach:
(Iceland) Teitur Þórðarson
