= Norway national football team results (1980–1999) =

- Win Draw Loss

This is a list of the Norway national football team results from 1980 to 1999.

== 1980s ==
Win Draw Loss

=== 1980 ===
22 May Match 410	Norway	1–0	Bulgaria	Oslo, Norway

4 June Match 411	Denmark	3–1	Norway	Copenhagen, Denmark

14 July Match 412	Norway	3–1	Iceland	Oslo, Norway

21 August Match 413	Norway	6–1	Finland	Oslo, Norway

10 September Match 414	England	4–0	Norway	London, England

24 September Match 415	Norway	1–1	Romania	Oslo, Norway

21 August Match 416	Switzerland	1–2	Norway	Bern, Switzerland

=== 1981 ===
29 April Match 417	Bulgaria	1–0	Norway	Pleven, Bulgaria

20 May Match 418	Norway	1–2	Hungary	Oslo, Norway

3 June Match 419	Romania	1–0	Norway	Bucharest, Romania

17 June Match 420	Norway	1–1	Switzerland	Oslo, Norway

2 July Match 421	Finland	3–1	Norway	Helsinki, Finland

12 August Match 422	Norway	2–2	Nigeria	Oslo, Norway

9 September Match 423	Norway	2–1	England	Oslo, Norway

23 September Match 424	Denmark	2–1	Norway	Copenhagen, Denmark

31 October Match 425	Hungary	4–1	Norway	Budapest, Hungary

=== 1982 ===
28 April Match 426	Norway	1–1	Finland	Stavanger, Norway

12 May Match 427	Norway	2–4	West Germany	Oslo, Norway

15 June Match 428	Norway	2–1	Denmark	Oslo, Norway

11 August Match 429	Norway	1–0	Sweden	Oslo, Norway

22 September Match 430	Wales	1–0	Norway	Swansea, Wales

13 October Match 431	Norway	3–1	Yugoslavia	Oslo, Norway

27 October Match 432	Bulgaria	2–2	Norway	Sofia, Bulgaria

13 November Match 433	Kuwait	1–0	Norway	Kuwait City, Kuwait

=== 1983 ===
19 May Match 434	Denmark	2–2	Norway	Aarhus, Denmark

1 June Match 435	Norway	1–1	Hungary	Oslo, Norway

15 June Match 436	Finland	1–1	Norway	Kuopio, Finland

30 June Match 437	Norway	0–1	Poland	Oslo, Norway

10 August Match 438	Norway	0–0	Romania	Oslo, Norway

17 August Match 439	Norway	1–1	Denmark	Oslo, Norway

7 September Match 440	Norway	1–2	Bulgaria	Oslo, Norway

21 September Match 441	Norway	0–0	Wales	Oslo, Norway

12 October Match 442	Yugoslavia	2–1	Norway	Belgrade, Yugoslavia

26 October Match 443	Norway	4–2	Finland	Moss, Norway

29 October Match 444	Norway	1–1	East Germany	Stavanger, Norway

9 November Match 445	Poland	1–0	Norway	Poznań, Poland

12 November Match 446	East Germany	1–0	Norway	Potsdam, East Germany

=== 1984 ===
1 May Match 447	Luxembourg	0–2	Norway	Ettelbruck, Luxembourg

23 May Match 448	Hungary	0–0	Norway	Székesfehérvár, Hungary

6 June Match 449	Norway	1–0	Wales	Trondheim, Norway

20 June Match 450	Iceland	0–1	Norway	Reykjavík, Iceland

29 July Match 451	Chile	0–0	Norway	Boston, United States

31 July Match 452	France	2–1	Norway	Boston, United States

2 August Match 453	Qatar	0–2	Norway	Boston, United States

29 August Match 454	Norway	1–1	Poland	Drammen, Norway

12 September Match 455	Norway	0–1	Switzerland	Oslo, Norway

26 September Match 456	Denmark	1–0	Norway	Copenhagen, Denmark

10 October Match 457	Norway	1–1	Soviet Union	Oslo, Norway

17 October Match 458	Norway	1–0	Republic of Ireland	Oslo, Norway

17 December Match 459	Egypt	0–1	Norway	Cairo, Egypt

20 December Match 460	Egypt	0–1	Norway	Ismailia, Egypt

=== 1985 ===
26 February Match 461	Wales	1–1	Norway	Wrexham, Wales

17 April Match 462	East Germany	1–0	Norway	Frankfurt, East Germany

1 May Match 463	Republic of Ireland	0–0	Denmark	Dublin, Republic of Ireland

22 May Match 464	Sweden	1–0	Norway	Gothenburg, Sweden

5 June Match 465	Norway	4–2	Wales	Bergen, Norway

14 August Match 466	Norway	0–1	East Germany	Oslo, Norway

10 September Match 467	Norway	3–0	Egypt	Oslo, Norway

25 September Match 468	Italy	1–2	Norway	Lecce, Italy

16 October Match 469	Norway	1–5	Denmark	Oslo, Norway

30 October Match 470	Soviet Union	1–0	Norway	Moscow, Soviet Union

13 November Match 471	Switzerland	1–1	Norway	Lucerne, Switzerland

=== 1986 ===
26 February Match 472	Grenada	1–2	Norway	St. George's, Grenada

30 April Match 473	Norway	1–0	Argentina	Oslo, Norway

13 May Match 474	Norway	1–0	Denmark	Oslo, Norway

4 June Match 475	Romania	3–1	Norway	Bucharest, Romania

20 August Match 476	Norway	2–2	Romania	Oslo, Norway

9 September Match 477	Norway	0–0	Hungary	Oslo, Norway

24 September Match 478	Norway	0–0	East Germany	Oslo, Norway

14 October Match 479	Norway	0–0	Soviet Union	Oslo, Norway

29 October Match 480	Soviet Union	4–0	Norway	Simferopol, Soviet Union

8 November Match 481	Switzerland	1–0	Norway	Lucerne, Switzerland

=== 1987 ===
24 March Match 482	Poland	4–1	Norway	Wrocław, Poland

6 May Match 483	Norway	1–1	Turkey	Moss, Norway

26 May Match 484	Norway	0–0	Bulgaria	Trondheim, Norway

28 May Match 485	Norway	0–0	Italy	Oslo, Norway

3 June Match 486	Norway	0–1	Soviet Union	Oslo, Norway

16 June Match 487	Norway	2–0	France	Oslo, Norway

12 August Match 488	Soviet Union	1–0	Norway	Moscow, Soviet Union

12 August Match 489	Norway	0–0	Sweden	Oslo, Norway

26 August Match 490	Norway	0–0	Switzerland	Tromsø, Norway

9 September Match 491	Iceland	2–1	Norway	Reykjavík, Iceland

23 September Match 492	Norway	0–1	Iceland	Oslo, Norway

14 October Match 493	France	1–1	Norway	Paris, France

28 October Match 494	East Germany	3–1	Norway	Magdeburg, East Germany

14 November Match 495	Bulgaria	4–0	Norway	Sofia, Bulgaria

18 November Match 496	Turkey	0–0	Norway	Ankara, Turkey

=== 1988 ===
26 April Match 497	Sweden	0–0	Norway	Katrineholm, Sweden

1 June Match 498	Norway	0–0	Republic of Ireland	Oslo, Norway

28 July Match 499	Norway	1–1	Brazil	Oslo, Norway

9 August Match 500	Norway	1–1	Bulgaria	Oslo, Norway

14 September Match 501	Norway	1–2	Scotland	Oslo, Norway

28 September Match 502	France	1–0	Norway	Paris, France

19 October Match 503	Italy	2–1	Norway	Pescara, Italy

2 November Match 504	Cyprus	0–3	Norway	Limassol, Cyprus

4 November Match 505	Czechoslovakia	3–2	Norway	Bratislava, Czechoslovakia

=== 1989 ===
22 February Match 506	Greece	4–2	Norway	Athens, Greece

2 May Match 507	Norway	0–3	Poland	Oslo, Norway

21 May Match 508	Norway	3–1	Cyprus	Oslo, Norway

31 May Match 509	Norway	4–1	Austria	Oslo, Norway

14 June Match 510	Norway	1–2	Yugoslavia	Oslo, Norway

23 August Match 511	Norway	0–0	Greece	Oslo, Norway

5 September Match 512	Norway	1–1	France	Oslo, Norway

11 October Match 513	Yugoslavia	1–0	Norway	Sarajevo, Yugoslavia

25 October Match 514	Kuwait	2–2	Norway	Hawally, Kuwait

15 November Match 515	Scotland	1–1	Norway	Glasgow, Scotland

== 1990s ==
Win Draw Loss

=== 1990 ===
4 February Rothmans Tournament	Norway	3–2	South Korea	Ta' Qali, Malta
15:00 UTC+1	Berg 53'; Skammelsrud 85'; Tangen 89'	Report	Hwang Sun-hong 26'; Lee Sang-yoon 57'	Stadium: National Stadium; Attendance: 1,500; Referee: Charles Agius (Malta)

7 February Rothmans Tournament	Malta	1–1	Norway	Ta' Qali, Malta
	Scerri 38'	Report	Fjørtoft 22'	Stadium: National Stadium; Attendance: 1,893; Referee: Edgar Azzopardi (Malta)

27 March Friendly	Northern Ireland	2–3	Norway	Belfast, Northern Ireland
19:00 UTC+0	Quinn 44'; Wilson 86'	Report	Skammelsrud 54'; Andersen 57'; Johnsen 90'	Stadium: Windsor Park; Attendance: 3,900; Referee: Howard King (Wales)

6 June Friendly	Norway	1–2	Denmark	Trondheim, Norway
19:00 UTC+2	Andersen 87' (pen.)	Report	Povlsen 15'; M. Laudrup 32'	Stadium: Lerkendal Stadion; Attendance: 8,035; Referee: Bo Persson (Sweden)

22 August Friendly	Norway	1–2	Sweden	Stavanger, Norway
19:00 UTC+2	Ahlsen 3' (pen.)	Report	Engqvist 40'; Fjellström 74'	Stadium: Stavanger Stadion; Attendance: 10,065; Referee: Kim Milton Nielsen (Denmark)

12 September UEFA Euro 1992 qualifying	Soviet Union	2–0	Norway	Moscow, Soviet Union
19:00 UTC+4	Kanchelskis 22'; Kuznetsov 60'	Report		Stadium: Central Lenin Stadium; Attendance: 23,000; Referee: Hubert Forstinger (Austria)

10 October UEFA Euro 1992 qualifying	Norway	0–0	Hungary	Bergen, Norway
19:00 UTC+2		Report		Stadium: Brann Stadion; Attendance: 6,304; Referee: John Spillane (Ireland)

31 October Friendly	Norway	6–1	Cameroon	Oslo, Norway
19:00 UTC+2	Bratseth 16'; Bohinen 40'; Dahlum 42'; Fjørtoft 69', 74'; Sørloth 80'	Report	Belle 86'	Stadium: Bislett Stadium; Attendance: 8,200; Referee: Kurt Sørensen (Denmark)

7 November Friendly	Tunisia	1–3	Norway	Bizerte, Tunisia
	Msakni 63' (pen.)	Report	Dahlum 38', 75'; Ingebrigtsen 57'	Stadium: 15 October Stadium; Attendance: 6,000; Referee: Rashid Madjiba (Algeria)

14 November UEFA Euro 1992 qualifying	Cyprus	0–3	Norway	Nicosia, Cyprus
19:00 UTC+2		Report	Sørloth 39'; Bohinen 50'; Brandhaug 64'	Stadium: Makario Stadium; Attendance: 2,133; Referee: Zoran Petrović (Yugoslavia)

=== 1991 ===
17 April Friendly	Austria	0–0	Norway	Vienna, Austria
19:30 UTC+2		Report		Stadium: Praterstadion; Attendance: 36,000; Referee: Zdravko Đokić (Yugoslavia)

1 May UEFA Euro 1992 qualifying	Norway	3–0	Cyprus	Oslo, Norway
19:00 UTC+2	Lydersen 49' (pen.); Dahlum 65'; Sørloth 90'	Report		Stadium: Ullevaal Stadion; Attendance: 5,825; Referee: Kaj Natri (Finland)

23 May Friendly	Norway	1–0	Romania	Oslo, Norway
19:00 UTC+2	Fjørtoft 27'	Report		Stadium: Ullevaal Stadion; Attendance: 4,379; Referee: Brian Hill (England)

5 June UEFA Euro 1992 qualifying	Norway	2–1	Italy	Oslo, Norway
19:00 UTC+2	Dahlum 4'; Bohinen 25'	Report	Schillaci 77'	Stadium: Ullevaal Stadion; Attendance: 24,346; Referee: Mario van der Ende (Netherlands)

8 August Friendly	Norway	1–2	Sweden	Oslo, Norway
20:00 UTC+2	Leonhardsen 12'	Report	Brolin 14'; Limpar 40'	Stadium: Ullevaal Stadion; Attendance: 9,482; Referee: Hans-Peter Dellwing (Germany)

28 August UEFA Euro 1992 qualifying	Norway	0–1	Soviet Union	Oslo, Norway
19:00 UTC+2		Report	Mostovoi 74'	Stadium: Ullevaal Stadion; Attendance: 24,383; Referee: Howard King (Wales)

25 September Friendly	Norway	2–3	Czechoslovakia	Oslo, Norway
19:00 UTC+2	Jakobsen 41'; Fjørtoft 79'	Report	Němeček 18'; Moravčík 53'; Kuka 81'	Stadium: Ullevaal Stadion; Attendance: 3,468; Referee: John Nielsen (Denmark)

30 October UEFA Euro 1992 qualifying	Hungary	0–0	Norway	Szombathely, Hungary
20:00 UTC+1		Report		Stadium: Rohonci Street Stadium; Attendance: 4,609; Referee: Gérard Biguet (France)

13 November UEFA Euro 1992 qualifying	Italy	1–1	Norway	Genoa, Italy
19:15 UTC+1	Rizzitelli 83'	Report	Jakobsen 60'	Stadium: Stadio Luigi Ferraris; Attendance: 21,372; Referee: Karl-Josef Assenmacher (Germany)

=== 1992 ===
7 January Friendly	Egypt	0–0	Norway	Cairo, Egypt
		Report		Stadium: Cairo International Stadium; Attendance: 11,872; Referee: Jamal Al-Sharif (Syria)

4 February Friendly	Bermuda	1–3	Norway	Hamilton, Bermuda
	Goater 28'	Report	Leonhardsen 31', 55', 63'	Stadium: Bermuda National Stadium; Attendance: 2,300; Referee: Rex Osborne (Bermuda)

29 April Friendly	Denmark	1–0	Norway	Aarhus, Denmark
19:00 UTC+2	Elstrup 59'	Report		Stadium: Aarhus Stadion; Attendance: 7,000; Referee: Simo Ruokonen (Finland)

13 May Friendly	Norway	2–0	Faroe Islands	Oslo, Norway
19:00 UTC+2	Sørloth 40'; Bohinen 63'	Report		Stadium: Ullevaal Stadion; Attendance: 4,165; Referee: Ilkka Koho (Finland)

3 June Friendly	Norway	0–0	Scotland	Oslo, Norway
20:00 UTC+2		Report		Stadium: Ullevaal Stadion; Attendance: 8,786; Referee: Anders Frisk (Sweden)

26 August Friendly	Norway	2–2	Sweden	Oslo, Norway
20:00 UTC+2	Leonhardsen 18'; Nilsen 89'	Report	Dahlin 30'; Pettersson 62'	Stadium: Ullevaal Stadion; Attendance: 8,420; Referee: Kaj Østergaard (Denmark)

9 September 1994 FIFA World Cup qualification	Norway	10–0	San Marino	Oslo, Norway
20:00 UTC+2	Rekdal 4', 79'; Halle 6', 53', 70'; Sørloth 15', 22'; Nilsen 46', 67'; Mykland 74'	Report		Stadium: Ullevaal Stadion; Attendance: 6,511; Referee: Esa Palsi (Finland)

23 September 1994 FIFA World Cup qualification	Norway	2–1	Netherlands	Oslo, Norway
20:00 UTC+2	Rekdal 9' (pen.); Sørloth 78'	Report	Bergkamp 10'	Stadium: Ullevaal Stadion; Attendance: 19,998; Referee: Rémi Harrel (France)

7 October 1994 FIFA World Cup qualification	San Marino	0–2	Norway	Serravalle, San Marino
20:30 UTC+2		Report	Jakobsen 7'; J. Flo 19'	Stadium: Stadio Olimpico; Attendance: 1,187; Referee: Juan Ansuátegui Roca (Spain)

14 October 1994 FIFA World Cup qualification	England	1–1	Norway	London, England
20:00 UTC+1	Platt 55'	Report	Rekdal 77'	Stadium: Wembley Stadium; Attendance: 51,441; Referee: Arturo Brizio Carter (Mexico)

2 December Friendly	China	2–1	Norway	Guangzhou, China
20:00 UTC+8	Zhu Bo 35'; Peng Weiguo 51'	Report	J. Flo 85'	Stadium: Tianhe Stadium; Attendance: 35,000; Referee: Li Shaofeng (China)

=== 1993 ===
10 February Friendly	Portugal	1–1	Norway	Faro, Portugal
20:30 UTC+0	Oceano 56'	Report	Sørloth 87'	Stadium: Estádio de São Luís; Attendance: 15,000; Referee: Antonio Martín Navarrete (Spain)

30 March Friendly	Qatar	1–6	Norway	Doha, Qatar
17:00 UTC+3	Soufi 66'	Report	Leonhardsen 6'; J. Flo 26'; Fjørtoft 43', 51', 59'; Jakobsen 74'	Stadium: Khalifa International Stadium; Attendance: 6,000; Referee: Fredy Philippoz (Switzerland)

28 April 1994 FIFA World Cup qualification	Norway	3–1	Turkey	Oslo, Norway
20:00 UTC+2	Rekdal 14' (pen.); Fjørtoft 17'; Jakobsen 55'	Report	Feyyaz 57'	Stadium: Ullevaal Stadion; Attendance: 21,530; Referee: Hans-Jürgen Weber (Germany)

2 June 1994 FIFA World Cup qualification	Norway	2–0	England	Oslo, Norway
20:00 UTC+2	Leonhardsen 43'; Bohinen 48'	Report		Stadium: Ullevaal Stadion; Attendance: 22,256; Referee: Sándor Puhl (Hungary)

9 June 1994 FIFA World Cup qualification	Netherlands	0–0	Norway	Rotterdam, Netherlands
20:15 UTC+2		Report		Stadium: De Kuip; Attendance: 42,600; Referee: Vassilios Nikakis (Greece)

11 August Friendly	Faroe Islands	0–7	Norway	Toftir, Faroe Islands
20:00 UTC+1		Report	Bohinen 6' (pen.); Leonhardsen 9'; Mjelde 27', 39'; Østenstad 74', 87'; Pedersen 75'	Stadium: Tofta Leikvøllur; Attendance: 800; Referee: Lars Gerner (Denmark)

8 September Friendly	Norway	1–0	United States	Oslo, Norway
20:00 UTC+2	Bjørnebye 14'	Report		Stadium: Ullevaal Stadion; Attendance: 16,348; Referee: Michel Zen-Ruffinen (Switzerland)

22 September 1994 FIFA World Cup qualification	Norway	1–0	Poland	Oslo, Norway
20:00 UTC+2	J. Flo 55'	Report		Stadium: Ullevaal Stadion; Attendance: 21,968; Referee: Pierluigi Pairetto (Italy)

13 October 1994 FIFA World Cup qualification	Poland	0–3	Norway	Poznań, Poland
20:00 UTC+1		Report	J. Flo 61'; Fjørtoft 63'; Johnsen 89'	Stadium: Stadion Miejski; Attendance: 11,000; Referee: Václav Krondl (Czech Republic)

10 November 1994 FIFA World Cup qualification	Turkey	2–1	Norway	Istanbul, Turkey
18:00 UTC+2	Ertuğrul 5', 26'	Report	Bohinen 48'	Stadium: Şükrü Saracoğlu Stadium; Attendance: 12,000; Referee: Sergei Khusainov (Russia)

=== 1994 ===
15 January Friendly	United States	2–1	Norway	Tempe, United States
20:00 UTC-7	Balboa 55'; Jones 90'	Report	Strandli 22'	Stadium: Sun Devil Stadium; Attendance: 15,386; Referee: Miguel Ángel Salas (Mexico)

19 January Friendly	Costa Rica	0–0	Norway	San Diego, United States
24:00 UTC-8		Report		Stadium: Jack Murphy Stadium; Attendance: 56,222; Referee: Arturo Angeles (United States)

9 March Friendly	Wales	1–3	Norway	Cardiff, Wales
20:30 UTC+1	Coleman 90'	Report	J. Flo 5'; Mykland 50'; Jakobsen 51'	Stadium: Ninian Park; Attendance: 9,992; Referee: John Ferry (Northern Ireland)

20 April Friendly	Norway	0–0	Portugal	Oslo, Norway
19:00 UTC+2		Report		Stadium: Ullevaal Stadion; Attendance: 17,509; Referee: Andrew Waddell (Scotland)

22 May Friendly	England	0–0	Norway	London, England
16:00 UTC+1		Report		Stadium: Wembley Stadium; Attendance: 64,327; Referee: Kim Milton Nielsen (Denmark)

1 June Friendly	Norway	2–1	Denmark	Oslo, Norway
20:00 UTC+2	Jakobsen 35'; H. Berg 45'	Report	Povlsen 42'	Stadium: Ullevaal Stadion; Attendance: 26,123; Referee: Leif Sundell (Sweden)

5 June Friendly	Sweden	2–0	Norway	Solna, Sweden
16:00 UTC+2	Brolin 56', 62' (pen.)	Report		Stadium: Råsunda Stadium; Attendance: 29,691; Referee: Kim Milton Nielsen (Denmark)

19 June 1994 FIFA World Cup Group E	Norway	1–0	Mexico	Washington, D.C., United States
16:00 UTC-4	Rekdal 84'	Report		Stadium: Robert F. Kennedy Memorial Stadium; Attendance: 52,395; Referee: Sándor Puhl (Hungary)

23 June 1994 FIFA World Cup Group E	Italy	1–0	Norway	East Rutherford, United States
16:00 UTC-4	D. Baggio 69'	Report		Stadium: Giants Stadium; Attendance: 74,624; Referee: Hellmut Krug (Germany)

28 June 1994 FIFA World Cup Group E	Republic of Ireland	0–0	Norway	East Rutherford, United States
12:30 UTC-4		Report		Stadium: Giants Stadium; Attendance: 72,404; Referee: José Torres Cadena (Colombia)

7 September UEFA Euro 1996 qualifying	Norway	1–0	Belarus	Oslo, Norway
20:00 UTC+2	Frigård 88'	Report		Stadium: Ullevaal Stadion; Attendance: 16,739; Referee: Guy Goethals (Belgium)

12 October UEFA Euro 1996 qualifying	Norway	1–1	Netherlands	Oslo, Norway
19:45 UTC+1	Rekdal 52' (pen.)	Report	Roy 22'	Stadium: Ullevaal Stadion; Attendance: 22,293; Referee: Jim McCluskey (Scotland)

16 November UEFA Euro 1996 qualifying	Belarus	0–4	Norway	Minsk, Belarus
19:00 UTC+2		Report	Berg 34'; Leonhardsen 39'; Bohinen 52'; Rekdal 83' (pen.)	Stadium: Dinamo Stadium; Attendance: 5,711; Referee: Lube Spasov (Bulgaria)

14 December UEFA Euro 1996 qualifying	Malta	0–1	Norway	Ta' Qali, Malta
19:15 UTC+1		Report	Fjørtoft 10'	Stadium: Ta' Qali National Stadium; Attendance: 5,717; Referee: Gianni Beschin (Italy)

=== 1995 ===
6 February Friendly	Estonia	0–7	Norway	Larnaca, Cyprus
20:00 UTC+2		Report	Jakobsen 4', 73'; Bohinen 13', 58'; Brattbakk 48', 89'; Halle 57'	Stadium: GSZ Stadium; Attendance: 200; Referee: Anastasios Papaioannou (Cyprus)

8 February Friendly	Cyprus	0–2	Norway	Nicosia, Cyprus
20:00 UTC+2		Report	Leonhardsen 21'; J. Flo 24'	Stadium: Makario Stadium; Attendance: 1,000; Referee: Amit Klein (Israel)

29 March UEFA Euro 1996 qualifying	Luxembourg	0–2	Norway	Luxembourg City, Luxembourg
20:00 UTC+2		Report	Leonhardsen 35'; Aase 77'	Stadium: Stade Josy Barthel; Attendance: 3,031; Referee: Nikolai Levnikov (Russia)

26 April UEFA Euro 1996 qualifying	Norway	5–0	Luxembourg	Oslo, Norway
20:00 UTC+2	Jakobsen 11'; Fjørtoft 12'; Brattbakk 24'; Berg 46'; Rekdal 52'	Report		Stadium: Ullevaal Stadion; Attendance: 15,124; Referee: John Ferry (Northern Ireland)

25 May Friendly	Norway	3–2	Ghana	Oslo, Norway
20:15 UTC+2	Rekdal 8'; Fjørtoft 50', 52'	Report	A. Pelé 51', 59'	Stadium: Ullevaal Stadion; Attendance: 8,312; Referee: Mika Peltola (Finland)

7 June UEFA Euro 1996 qualifying	Norway	2–0	Malta	Oslo, Norway
19:45 UTC+2	Fjørtoft 43'; Flo 88'	Report		Stadium: Ullevaal Stadion; Attendance: 15,180; Referee: Zbigniew Przesmycki (Poland)

22 July Friendly	Norway	0–0	France	Oslo, Norway
20:45 UTC+2		Report		Stadium: Ullevaal Stadion; Attendance: 12,030; Referee: Hugo Luijten (Netherlands)

16 August UEFA Euro 1996 qualifying	Norway	1–1	Czech Republic	Oslo, Norway
20:15 UTC+2	Berg 27'	Report	Suchopárek 85'	Stadium: Ullevaal Stadion; Attendance: 22,054; Referee: Sergei Khusainov (Russia)

6 September UEFA Euro 1996 qualifying	Czech Republic	2–0	Norway	Prague, Czechia
20:15 UTC+2	Skuhravý 6' (pen.); Drulák 87'	Report		Stadium: Letná Stadium; Attendance: 19,522; Referee: Kurt Röthlisberger (Switzerland)

11 October Friendly	Norway	0–0	England	Oslo, Norway
20:15 UTC+2		Report		Stadium: Ullevaal Stadion; Attendance: 21,006; Referee: Karl-Erik Nilsson (Sweden)

15 November UEFA Euro 1996 qualifying	Netherlands	3–0	Norway	Rotterdam, Netherlands
20:05 UTC+1	Seedorf 47'; Mulder 88'; Overmars 89'	Report		Stadium: De Kuip; Attendance: 42,325; Referee: Dermot Gallagher (England)

26 November Friendly	Jamaica	1–1	Norway	Kingston, Jamaica
16:00 UTC-5	Wilson 90'	Report	Solskjaer 80'	Stadium: Independence Park; Attendance: 17,500; Referee: Ramesh Ramdhan (Trinidad and Tobago)

29 November Friendly	Trinidad and Tobago	3–2	Norway	Port of Spain, Trinidad and Tobago
15:45 UTC-4	Latapy 24' (pen.), 45', 53' (pen.)	Report	T. A. Flo 11'; Levernes 20'	Stadium: Queen's Park Oval; Attendance: 15,000; Referee: Mark Forde (Barbados)

=== 1996 ===
7 February Friendly	Spain	1–0	Norway	Las Palmas, Spain
21:30 UTC+1	Kiko 83'	Report		Stadium: Estadio Insular; Attendance: 18,500; Referee: Marcello Nicchi (Italy)

27 March Friendly	Northern Ireland	0–2	Norway	Belfast, Northern Ireland
19:30 UTC+0	Solskjær 51'; Østenstad 83'	Report		Stadium: Windsor Park; Attendance: 5,343; Referee: John Ashman (Wales)

24 April Friendly	Norway	0–0	Spain	Oslo, Norway
20:00 UTC+2		Report		Stadium: Ullevaal Stadion; Attendance: 11,898; Referee: Georg Dardenne (Germany)

2 June 1998 FIFA World Cup qualification	Norway	5–0	Azerbaijan	Oslo, Norway
20:00 UTC+2	Solbakken 7', 46'; Solskjær 37', 89'; Strandli 59'	Report		Stadium: Ullevaal Stadion; Attendance: 14,012; Referee: Alan Snoddy (Northern Ireland)

1 September Friendly	Norway	1–0	Georgia	Oslo, Norway
20:00 UTC+2	Solskjær 87' (pen.)	Report		Stadium: Ullevaal Stadion; Attendance: 8,910; Referee: Knud Stadsgaard (Denmark)

9 October 1998 FIFA World Cup qualification	Norway	3–0	Hungary	Oslo, Norway
20:00 UTC+2	Rekdal 83', 89', 90' (pen.)	Report		Stadium: Ullevaal Stadion; Attendance: 22,480; Referee: Hugh Dallas (Scotland)

10 November 1998 FIFA World Cup qualification	Switzerland	0–1	Norway	Bern, Switzerland
14:30 UTC+1		Report	Leonhardsen 32'	Stadium: Wankdorf Stadion; Attendance: 22,000; Referee: Manuel Díaz Vega (Spain)

=== 1997 ===
18 January Four Nations Tournament (Australia)	South Korea	1–0	Norway	Melbourne, Australia
18:15 UTC+10	Kim Do-hoon 57'	Report		Stadium: Lakeside Stadium; Attendance: 10,496; Referee: Gerry Connolly (Australia)

22 January Four Nations Tournament (Australia)	New Zealand	0–3	Norway	Brisbane, Australia
16:15 UTC+10		Report	Skammelsrud 59', 80'; H. Flo 83'	Stadium: Lang Park; Attendance: 15,160; Referee: Mark Shield (Australia)

25 January Four Nations Tournament (Australia)	Australia	1–0	Norway	Sydney, Australia
19:30 UTC+10	Hooker 71'	Report		Stadium: Sydney Football Stadium; Attendance: 17,429; Referee: Eddie Lennie (Australia)

29 March Friendly	United Arab Emirates	1–4	Norway	Sharjah, United Arab Emirates
17:00 UTC+4	Mubarak 18'	Report	T. A. Flo 2', 38', 66'; Solbakken 90'	Stadium: Sharjah Stadium; Attendance: 1,000; Referee: Younis Hasan Mohamed (United Arab Emirates)

30 April 1998 FIFA World Cup qualification	Norway	1–1	Finland	Oslo, Norway
20:00 UTC+2	Solskjær 83'	Report	Sumiala 60'	Stadium: Ullevaal Stadion; Attendance: 22,782; Referee: Markus Merk (Germany)

30 May Friendly	Norway	4–2	Brazil	Oslo, Norway
20:00 UTC+2	Rudi 9'; T. A. Flo 17', 33'; Østenstad 76'	Report	Djalminha 20'; Romário 66'	Stadium: Ullevaal Stadion; Attendance: 21,799; Referee: Stephen Lodge (England)

8 June 1998 FIFA World Cup qualification	Hungary	1–1	Norway	Budapest, Hungary
20:00 UTC+2	Kovács 22'	Report	Rudi 9'	Stadium: Nepstadion; Attendance: 25,300; Referee: David Elleray (England)

20 July Friendly	Iceland	0–1	Norway	Reykjavík, Iceland
20:00 UTC+0		Report	J. Flo 73'	Stadium: Laugardalsvöllur; Attendance: 6,323; Referee: Richard O'Hanlon (Ireland)

20 August 1998 FIFA World Cup qualification	Finland	0–4	Norway	Helsinki, Finland
19:00 UTC+3		Report	Solbakken 9'; Rudi 12'; J. Flo 48'; T. A. Flo 84'	Stadium: Olympiastadion; Attendance: 35,520; Referee: Vadim Zhuk (Belarus)

6 September 1998 FIFA World Cup qualification	Azerbaijan	0–1	Norway	Baku, Azerbaijan
20:00 UTC+5		Report	T. A. Flo 42'	Stadium: Tofik Bakhramov Stadium; Attendance: 8,000; Referee: Günter Benkö (Austria)

10 September 1998 FIFA World Cup qualification	Norway	5–0	Switzerland	Oslo, Norway
20:00 UTC+2	Jakobsen 46'; Solbakken 51'; Eggen 65'; Østenstad 75'; T. A. Flo 85'	Report		Stadium: Ullevaal Stadion; Attendance: 22,603; Referee: Hellmut Krug (Germany)

8 October Friendly	Norway	0–0	Colombia	Oslo, Norway
20:00 UTC+2		Report		Stadium: Ullevaal Stadion; Attendance: 18,028; Referee: Karl-Erik Nilsson (Sweden)

=== 1998 ===
25 February Friendly	France	3–3	Norway	Marseille, France
20:45 UTC+1	Blanc 23'; Zidane 28'; Desailly 90+2'	Report	Strandli 13'; Flo 68'; Heggem 89'	Stadium: Stade Vélodrome; Attendance: 47,124; Referee: Jan Wegereef (Netherlands)

25 March Friendly	Belgium	2–2	Norway	Brussels, Belgium
20:00 UTC+1	Van der Elst 8'; Wilmots 65'	Report	Riseth 12'; Solskjær 70'	Stadium: King Baudouin Stadium; Attendance: 13,371; Referee: Hans-Jürgen Weber (Germany)

22 April Friendly	Denmark	0–2	Norway	Copenhagen, Denmark
19:15 UTC+2		Report	Leonhardsen 25'; Flo 58'	Stadium: Parken Stadium; Attendance: 39,277; Referee: Mikko Vuorela (Sweden)

20 May Friendly	Norway	5–2	Mexico	Oslo, Norway
18:45 UTC+2	Strand 12'; H. Flo 15'; Johnsen 31'; Berg 40'; Riseth 81'	Report	Peláez 19', 65'	Stadium: Bislett Stadion; Attendance: 16,274; Referee: Leif Sundell (Sweden)

27 May Friendly	Norway	6–0	Saudi Arabia	Molde, Norway
19:00 UTC+2	Rekdal 21' (pen.); Solskjær 31', 42' (pen.); Østenstad 83'; Flo 87'; Strand 88'	Report		Stadium: Molde Stadion; Attendance: 13,114; Referee: Knud Erik Fisker (Denmark)

10 June 1998 FIFA World Cup Group A	Morocco	2–2	Norway	Montpellier, France
21:00 UTC+2	Hadji 37'; Hadda 60'	Report	Chippo 45+1' (o.g.); Eggen 61'	Stadium: Stade de la Mosson; Attendance: 29,800; Referee: Pirom Un-prasert (Thailand)

16 June 1998 FIFA World Cup Group A	Norway	1–1	Scotland	Bordeaux, France
17:30 UTC+2	H. Flo 46'	Report	Burley 66'	Stadium: Parc Lescure; Attendance: 31,800; Referee: László Vágner (Hungary)

23 June 1998 FIFA World Cup Group A	Brazil	1–2	Norway	Marseille, France
21:00 UTC+2	Bebeto 78'	Report	T. A. Flo 83'; Rekdal 89' (pen.)	Stadium: Stade Vélodrome; Attendance: 55,000; Referee: Esfandiar Baharmast (United States)

27 June 1998 FIFA World Cup Round of 16	Italy	1–0	Norway	Marseille, France
16:30 UTC+2	Vieri 18'	Report		Stadium: Stade Vélodrome; Attendance: 55,000; Referee: Bernd Heynemann (Germany)

19 August Friendly	Norway	0–0	Romania	Oslo, Norway
21:15 UTC+2		Report		Stadium: Ullevaal Stadion; Attendance: 8,909; Referee: Kenny Clark (Scotland)

6 September UEFA Euro 2000 qualifying	Norway	1–3	Latvia	Oslo, Norway
20:15 UTC+2	Solbakken 17'	Report	Pahars 11'; Štolcers 53'; Zemļinskis 64' (pen.)	Stadium: Ullevaal Stadion; Attendance: 11,031; Referee: Sergei Shmolik (Belarus)

10 October UEFA Euro 2000 qualifying	Slovenia	1–2	Norway	Ljubljana, Slovenia
20:00 UTC+2	Zahovič 24'	Report	Flo 45'; Rekdal 80'	Stadium: Bežigrad Stadium; Attendance: 6,200; Referee: Andreas Schluchter (Switzerland)

14 October UEFA Euro 2000 qualifying	Norway	2–2	Albania	Oslo, Norway
19:00 UTC+2	Rekdal 81'; H. Berg 86'	Report	Bushi 37'; Tare 52'	Stadium: Ullevaal Stadion; Attendance: 17,770; Referee: Gerd Grabher (Austria)

18 November Friendly	Egypt	1–1	Norway	Cairo, Egypt
20:00 UTC+2	H. Hassan 39'	Report	Flo 63'	Stadium: Cairo International Stadium; Attendance: 25,000; Referee: Abdul Rahman Al Zaid (Saudi Arabia)

=== 1999 ===
20 January Israel Tri-Nations Tournament	Israel	0–1	Norway	Ramat Gan, Israel
18:30 UTC+2		Report	Skammelsrud 67' (pen.)	Stadium: Ramat Gan Stadium; Attendance: 4,000; Referee: Pierluigi Collina (Italy)

22 January Israel Tri-Nations Tournament	Estonia	3–3	Norway	Umm al-Fahm, Israel
21:00 UTC+2	Reim 75' (pen.); Zelinski 82', 89'	Report	Solbakken 22'; Strand 56'; Carew 72'	Stadium: HaShalom Stadium; Attendance: 3,000; Referee: Haim Yaakov (Israel)

10 February Friendly	Italy	0–0	Norway	Pisa, Italy
20:45 UTC+2		Report		Stadium: Arena Garibaldi; Attendance: 17,651; Referee: Manuel Mejuto González (Spain)

27 March UEFA Euro 2000 qualifying	Greece	0–2	Norway	Athens, Greece
19:30 UTC+2		Report	Solskjær 37', 86'	Stadium: Spiros Louis Stadium; Attendance: 42,566; Referee: Leslie Irvine (England)

28 April UEFA Euro 2000 qualifying	Georgia	1–4	Norway	Tbilisi, Georgia
21:00 UTC+5	Janashia 57'	Report	Iversen 16'; Flo 25', 35'; Solskjær 37'	Stadium: Boris Paichadze National Stadium; Attendance: 15,000; Referee: Sándor Puhl (Hungary)

20 May Friendly	Norway	6–0	Jamaica	Oslo, Norway
20:15 UTC+2	Flo 5', 53'; Iversen 71'; Leonhardsen 75'; Dahlum 82'; Lund 89'	Report		Stadium: Ullevaal Stadion; Attendance: 9,630; Referee: Andreas Schluchter (Switzerland)

30 May UEFA Euro 2000 qualifying	Norway	1–0	Georgia	Oslo, Norway
19:15 UTC+2	Iversen 4'	Report		Stadium: Ullevaal Stadion; Attendance: 18,236; Referee: Luc Huyghe (Belgium)

5 June UEFA Euro 2000 qualifying	Albania	1–2	Norway	Tirana, Albania
18:00 UTC+2	Tare 16'	Report	Iversen 3'; Flo 83'	Stadium: Qemal Stafa Stadium; Attendance: 5,000; Referee: Livio Bazzoli (Italy)

18 August Friendly	Norway	1–0	Lithuania	Oslo, Norway
19:15 UTC+2	Lund 87'	Report		Stadium: Ullevaal Stadion; Attendance: 11,108; Referee: Anders Frisk (Sweden)

4 September UEFA Euro 2000 qualifying	Norway	1–0	Greece	Oslo, Norway
16:00 UTC+2	Leonhardsen 34'	Report		Stadium: Ullevaal Stadion; Attendance: 24,133; Referee: Markus Merk (Germany)

8 September UEFA Euro 2000 qualifying	Norway	4–0	Slovenia	Oslo, Norway
19:15 UTC+2	Istenič 15' (o.g.); Iversen 17'; Solskjær 30'; Leonhardsen 67'	Report		Stadium: Ullevaal Stadion; Attendance: 24,288; Referee: Gilles Veissière (France)

9 October UEFA Euro 2000 qualifying	Latvia	1–2	Norway	Riga, Latvia
20:00 UTC+3	Pahars 52'	Report	Solskjær 51'; Flo 85'	Stadium: Daugava Stadium; Attendance: 2,500; Referee: Dietmar Drabek (Austria)

14 November Friendly	Norway	0–1	Germany	Oslo, Norway
17:30 UTC+1		Report	Scholl 90+2'	Stadium: Ullevaal Stadion; Attendance: 14,359; Referee: Dick Jol (Netherlands)
