= Redouane Drici =

Algerian footballer (born 1959)

Personal information
- Full name: Redouane Drici
- Date of birth: 7 March 1959 (age 67)
- Place of birth: Algeria
- Position: Defender

Senior career*
Years	Team	Apps	(Gls)
1984	Brann	6	(1)
1987–1991	Brann	66	(5)

International career
1982	Algeria	6	
- * Club domestic league appearances and goals

Redouane Drici (born 7 March 1959) is an Algerian former footballer who played as a defender. He played 5 seasons for the Norwegian club Brann, and was part of the team that played and lost two Norwegian Cup finals. Drici was capped six times for Algeria.

== Career ==
In 1984, Drici signed a short-term contract with the Norwegian club Brann after visiting Bergen on a vacation. After playing for Brann the first half of the 1984 season, he moved back to Algeria.

Drici returned to Bergen and Brann in 1987, where he remained for four seasons. He was a centre back and normally played alongside Jan Halvor Halvorsen and Per Egil Ahlsen. Drici played the cup finals with Brann in 1987, which they lost to Bryne, and in 1988, which they lost to Rosenborg. In total, Drici played 72 league matches and scored six goals.

Drici was capped six times by Algeria during the spring of 1982. Algeria had in 1982 qualified for FIFA World Cup for the first time and Drici was hoping to join this historic moment, but, due to an injury, he was not eligible for Algeria's World Cup squad.

In 1995 and 1996 Drici was player coach of the sixth division club Valestrand Hjellvik FK.

Redouane Drici is married to a woman from Bergen, where he has lived since his return to the city in 1987. Today he works at Bergen Airport, Flesland.
