= Per Hilmar Nybø =

Norwegian footballer (1966–2026)

Personal information
- Date of birth: 21 April 1966
- Place of birth: Fana, Norway
- Date of death: 25 August 2026 (aged 60)
- Place of death: Bergen, Norway
- Positions: Midfielder; forward

Youth career
- Fana

Senior career*
Years	Team	Apps	(Gls)
1983–1985	Fana		
1986–1992	Brann	137	(25)
1993–2000	Fana		

Managerial career
- 2004–2005: Fana
- * Club domestic league appearances and goals

Per Hilmar Nybø (21 April 1966 – 25 August 2026) was a Norwegian footballer who played seven seasons in the Norwegian top division for Brann. He also played many years for Fana, both before and after his time with Brann. Nybø was a versatile player who was deployed in many positions while at Brann, most commonly on the left side of midfield, but also as a striker, left-back or central midfielder.

== Career ==
Nybø grew up in Fana Municipality which was an independent entity until 1972 when it was absorbed into the city of Bergen. He began his football career in the early 1970s when he joined his local team Fana IL where he rose through the youth department, and made his first-team debut in 1983. He quickly emerged as one of the team's best players, and he was signed by Brann ahead of the 1986 season for a 25,000 NOK transfer fee.

In 1986, he played 12 league games, scoring twice, and helped Brann gain promotion back to the top division after a one-year absence. In the following years, he was a regular member of the Brann sides that reached the Norwegian Cup final in 1987 and 1988, but was on the losing team on both occasions.

In 1990, Nybø helped Brann to a 4th-place finish in the league, the club's best league performance during his seven-year spell at the club. Nybø was also Brann's top scorer that year with 11 league goals, including a hat-trick in Brann's 5-2 win against Strømsgodset on 22 July 1990. However, by 1992 he was no longer first-choice in the lineup, and his contract was not renewed. He played a total of 154 first-team matches and scored 33 goals for Brann, including 137 games and 25 goals in league competition.

After leaving Brann, Nybø returned to his old club Fana IL where he remained for the rest of his career. He retired as a player after the 2000 season, and immediately joined the club's coaching staff. Nybø is reported to have played a total of 262 league and cup matches for Fana. He was Fana's head coach in 2004 and 2005.

== Personal life and death ==
Nybø struggled with a number of health issues both during and after his football career. In 1989, while still a member of Brann, he was diagnosed with ulcerative colitis, an inflammatory bowel disease. In 2014, he was diagnosed with sclerosing cholangitis, a progressive disease of the liver and gallbladder, and in 2023 he was diagnosed with liver cancer.

On 25 August 2026, Nybø died after a three-year battle against cancer. He was 60.
