= 1988 Norwegian Football Cup =

Norgesmesterskapet i fotball for herrer

Tournament details
- Country: Norway
- Teams: 128 (main competition)

Final positions
- Champions: Rosenborg (4th title)
- Runners-up: Brann

The 1988 Norwegian Football Cup was the 83rd edition of the Norwegian annual knockout football tournament. The Cup was won by Rosenborg after they beat Brann in the final. It took a replay to decide the winner. This was Rosenborg's fourth Norwegian Cup title.

== First round ==
Team 1	Score	Team 2
16 May 1988
Fremad	4–0	Nybergsund
18 May 1988
Harstad	9–0	Luna
Skjervøy	0–1	Skarp
Honningsvåg	1–1 (1–4 p)	Tromsø
Narvik/Nor	6–2	Bardu
Strømsgodset	0–0 (1–4 p)	Geilo
Florø	0–7	Sogndal
Fossum	0–3	Vålerengen
Grei	3–1	Ullern
Sprint/Jeløy	1–1 (5–6 p)	Ørn-Horten
Hafslund	0–5	Moss
Kjelsås	4–0	Bøler
Fredrikstad	4–0	Selbak
Bjørkelangen	0–4	Raufoss
Brumunddal	0–1	Faaberg
Drøbak/Frogn	2–0	Lisleby
Kopervik	5–4 (a.e.t.)	Haugar
Vard Haugesund	2–0	Figgjo
Voss	0–3	Brann
Åsane	2–3	Varegg
Fram Skatval	1–5	Steinkjer
Strindheim	6–0	Orkdal
Brattvåg	2–3	Kristiansund
Hødd	3–2 (a.e.t.)	Langevåg
Skeid	1–0	Årvoll
Lillestrøm	6–0	Jardar
Råde	4–1	Kvik Halden
Lyn	6–2	Holter
Stålkameratene	1–2	Sandnessjøen
Bodø/Glimt	2–0	Svolvær
Tromsdalen	1–4	Mjølner
Mosjøen	1–3	Fauske/Sprint
Kapp	0–3	Gjøvik-Lyn
Sander	0–1	Kongsvinger
Røros	0–1	Alvdal
Sel	3–3 (5–4 p)	Sunndal
Aalesund	3–0	Hareid
Clausenengen	5–0	Skarbøvik
Surnadal	0–4	Molde
Spjelkavik	1–0	Volda
Ekne	1–3	Nessegutten
Kvik Trondheim	1–4	Stjørdals/Blink
Leik	0–5	Rosenborg
Beitstad	3–1	Namsos
Pors	2–0	Sandefjord BK
Nøtterøy	0–5	Eik-Tønsberg
Lillehammer	2–2 (4–5 p)	HamKam
Frigg	5–1	Ready
Sørfjell	1–4	Jerv
Vidar	3–1	Klepp
Eiger	0–2	Start
Gulset	3–2	Odd
Vadmyra	1–2	Fyllingen
Fana	2–1	Ny-Krohnborg
Madla	0–6	Bryne
Donn	6–5	Sødal
Slemmestad	0–4	Mjøndalen
Eidsvold Turn	0–0 (0–2 p)	Strømmen
Ålgård	2–3	Viking
Randaberg	1–0	Staal
Trott	0–1	Djerv 1919
Os	3–0	Stord
19 May 1988
Larvik Turn	1–0	Åssiden
Teie	1–2 (a.e.t.)	Fram Larvik

== Second round ==
Team 1	Score	Team 2
10 June 1988
Molde	2–0	Spjelkavik
11 June 1988
Geilo	3–2	Sogndal
Tromsø	4–2	Narvik/Nor
Nessegutten	0–1	Stjørdals/Blink
Aalesund	0–4	Clausenengen
Kristiansund	7–0	Hødd
12 June 1988
Harstad	3–3 (5–6 p)	Skarp
Vålerengen	4–3	Grei
Ørn-Horten	0–1 (a.e.t.)	Moss
Kjelsås	1–0	Fredrikstad
Raufoss	2–1	Faaberg
Drøbak/Frogn	1–0	Larvik Turn
Kopervik	0–1	Vard Haugesund
Brann	9–1	Varegg
Steinkjer	1–1 (3–4 p)	Strindheim
Skeid	0–2	Lillestrøm
Råde	2–1	Lyn
Sandnessjøen	1–5	Bodø/Glimt
Mjølner	4–2	Fauske/Sprint
Gjøvik-Lyn	0–3	Kongsvinger
Alvdal	5–0	Sel
Rosenborg	9–0	Beitstad
Pors	0–4	Eik-Tønsberg
HamKam	6–1	Frigg
Jerv	5–5 (5–4 p)	Vidar
Start	5–0	Gulset
Fyllingen	3–2	Fana
Bryne	2–0	Donn
Fram Larvik	1–2	Mjøndalen
Strømmen	1–0	Fremad
Viking	3–0	Randaberg
Djerv 1919	4–0	Os

== Third round ==
Team 1	Score	Team 2
6 July 1988
Skarp	0–2	Tromsø
Geilo	0–5	Vålerengen
Moss	10–0	Kjelsås
Raufoss	1–4	Drøbak/Frogn
Vard Haugesund	0–5	Brann
Strindheim	4–1	Kristiansund
Lillestrøm	2–3	Råde
Bodø/Glimt	3–0	Mjølner
Kongsvinger	1–2	Alvdal
Clausenengen	0–0 (3–4 p)	Molde
Stjørdals/Blink	1–2	Rosenborg
Eik-Tønsberg	4–2 (a.e.t.)	HamKam
Jerv	0–4	Start
Fyllingen	1–0	Bryne
Mjøndalen	1–0	Strømmen
Viking	1–0	Djerv 1919

== Fourth round ==
3 August 1988

Tromsø	0–1	Vålerengen
		Gjellestad 4'

Alfheim Stadion, Tromsø
Attendance: 4,117
Referee: Egil Nervik

3 August 1988

Moss	1–0	Drøbak/Frogn
Karlsrud 70'

Melløs Stadion, Moss
Attendance: 2,755
Referee: Per Arne Larsgård

3 August 1988

Brann	2–0	Strindheim
Ahlsen 16'; Johnsen 84'

Brann Stadion, Bergen
Attendance: 2,893
Referee: Svein G. Hermansen

3 August 1988

Alvdal	0–2	Molde
		K. Rekdal 54', 74'

Steinmoegga Idrettspark, Alvdal
Attendance: 3,550
Referee: Thorbjørn Aass

3 August 1988

Rosenborg	4–3	Eik-Tønsberg
Brandhaug 21', 52'; Jakobsen 29'; Sørloth 77'		Bjøme 3'; Kristiansen 6'; Fagernes 73'

Lerkendal Stadion, Trondheim
Attendance: 7,649
Referee: Einar Halle

3 August 1988

Start	6–3 (a.e.t.)	Fyllingen
Håberg 50' (pen.), 101', 114', 117'; Dahlum 90+3', 111'		Reigstad 20'; Pedersen 44', 113'

Kristiansand Stadion, Kristiansand
Attendance: 3,143
Referee: Torodd Pressberg

3 August 1988

Mjøndalen	4–3	Viking
Bråthen 33', 52' (pen.); Strand 50'; Kuvicek 60'		Tveit 1', 37', 46'

Nedre Eiker Stadion, Mjøndalen
Attendance: 2,177
Referee: Rolf Hauge

4 August 1988

Råde	1–0	Bodø/Glimt
Stærk 83'

Råde Idrettspark, Mjøndalen
Attendance: 3,240
Referee: Jan Erik Olsen

== Quarter-finals ==
24 August 1988

Vålerengen	0–1	Moss
		Fjærestad 53'

Bislett Stadion, Oslo
Attendance: 4,227
Referee: Erling Haugen

24 August 1988

Brann	1–0	Råde
O. Johnsen 45'

Brann Stadion, Bergen
Attendance: 11,237
Referee: Bjørn Kronborg

24 August 1988

Molde	1–2 (a.e.t.)	Rosenborg
Neerland 70'		Henriksen 89'; K. Rekdal 119' (o.g.)

Molde Stadion, Molde
Attendance: 10,240
Referee: Rune Pedersen

24 August 1988

Start	3–1	Mjøndalen
Dahlum 16', 20'; Håberg 88'		Bråthen 1'

Kristiansand Stadion, Kristiansand
Attendance: 6,800
Referee: Arlid Haugstad

== Semi-finals ==
17 September 1988

Moss	0–1	Brann
		Torvanger 27'

Melløs Stadion, Moss
Attendance: 1,749
Referee: Per Arne Larsgård

18 September 1988

Rosenborg	5–0	Start
Jakobsen 58', 61'; Sørloth 67', 78', 90'

Lerkendal Stadion, Trondheim
Attendance: 22,221
Referee: Thorodd Presberg

== Final ==
=== First match ===
23 October 1988
13:15 CEST (UTC+2)

Brann	2–2 (a.e.t.)	Rosenborg
Johnsen 87'; Torvanger 98'	Report	Sørloth 83', 95'

Ullevaal Stadion, Oslo
Attendance: 23,500
Referee: Bjørn Kronborg (Faaberg)

=== Replay match ===
30 October 1988
13:15 CET (UTC+1)

Rosenborg	2–0	Brann
Sørloth 25'; Løken 33'	Report

Ullevaal Stadion, Oslo
Attendance: 23,700
Referee: Thorodd Presberg (Strømsgodset)
