= Teitur Thordarson =

Icelandic footballer and coach

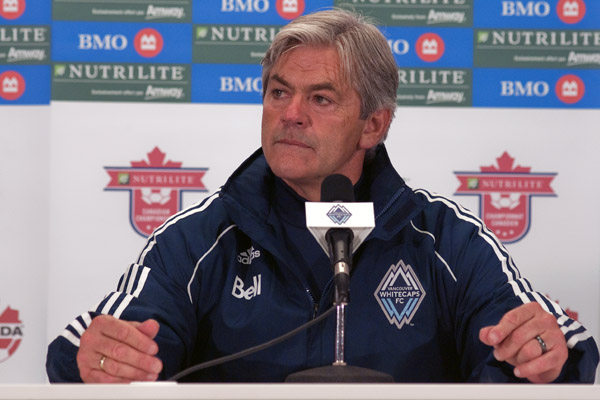
- Teitur in 2011

Personal information
- Date of birth: 14 January 1952 (age 74)
- Place of birth: Akranes, Iceland
- Position: Striker

Youth career
- 1968: IA Akranes

Senior career*
Years	Team	Apps	(Gls)
1969–1977	ÍA	99	(51)
1977	Jönköping	21	(10)
1978–1981	Öster	87	(35)
1981–1983	Lens	48	(20)
1983–1984	Cannes	31	(9)
1984–1985	Yverdon-Sport	13	(6)
1985–1986	Öster	18	(6)
1987	Skövde	16	(0)
Total		285	(117)

International career^{‡}
1972–1985	Iceland	41	(9)

Managerial career
- 1987–1988: Skövde
- 1988–1990: Brann
- 1991–1992: Lyn
- 1993: Grei
- 1994–1995: Lillestrøm
- 1995–1999: Estonia & Flora Tallinn
- 2000–2002: Brann
- 2002–2003: Lyn
- 2004–2005: Ull/Kisa
- 2006–2007: KR
- 2008–2010: Vancouver Whitecaps
- 2011: Vancouver Whitecaps FC
- 2012–2013: Barasat Euro Musketeers
- 2013: Funnefoss/Vormsund
- 2014–2018: Drøbak-Frogn
- * Club domestic league appearances and goals as of 12 September 2007 ‡ National team caps and goals as of 12 September 2007

Teitur Thordarson (Icelandic: Teitur Þórðarson; born 14 January 1952) is an Icelandic football coach. He is the older brother of Ólafur Þórðarson.

== Club career ==
=== Íþróttabandalag Akraness ===
Before coaching, Teitur playing as a striker for nearly two decades. He signed his first professional contract when he joined hometown club Íþróttabandalag Akraness in 1969. He scored 51 goals in 99 appearances, and won four championship titles with ÍA between 1969 and 1977.

=== Sweden ===
After a season with Swedish second division club Jönköping in 1977, Teitur helped Öster to three league championships in Sweden's top-flight Allsvenskan between 1978 and 1981.

=== France ===
In 1981, he moved to French club Lens where he scored 19 goals during the 1981–82 Ligue 1 season, finishing fourth in scoring. At Lens he played for former Liverpool, Lyon, and France manager Gérard Houllier. He then joined Cannes where Arsène Wenger was an assistant coach.

=== Switzerland and return to Sweden ===
Teitur then had a spell in Switzerland with Yverdon-Sport before returning to Sweden in 1985 to complete his playing career with Öster and Skövde.

== International career ==
Teitur received 41 caps for Iceland between 1972 and 1985. He scored nine goals and captained the team in some of the matches.

== Coaching career ==
=== Skövde ===
Teitur's coaching career extends over two decades starting in Sweden in 1987 with the last club he played for, Skövde.

=== Norway ===
In 1988, he landed his first head-coaching role in Norway's top-flight Tippeligaen when he joined Brann. He led the Bergen club to the 1988 Norwegian Football Cup Final and spent the following two seasons at Brann before ending his first spell by moving to Lyn for two seasons in 1991. After a season with Norwegian Second Division club Grei, Teitur took charge of Lillestrøm and led them to second- and fourth-placed Tippeligaen finishes in 1994 and 1995 respectively.

=== Estonia ===
In 1996, Teitur moved to Estonia to become head coach of their national team and Estonian club Flora Tallinn. He led Flora Tallinn to 3 Meistriliiga championships in 1994–95, 1997–98 and 1998. He also led the club to the Estonian Cup and the Estonian SuperCup titles in 1998.

Teitur helped the Baltic nation move up from 145th (January 1996) to 68th (November 1999) in the FIFA World Ranking. Though he was Estonia's first foreign coach since the country's independence in 1991, Teitur's efforts in developing Estonian football earned him the Order of the Cross of Terra Mariana (4th class) from the President of Estonia in February 2000.

=== Return to Norway ===
The turn of the millennium saw Teitur return to the Norwegian game for a second spell with Brann. He led the club to a second-place finish in the 2000 Tippeligaen season, and spent two more seasons with the Bergen outfit before making a return to another former club, Lyn in 2003. His final two years in Norway saw him coach second division club Ull/Kisa in 2004 and 2005.

=== KR Reykjavík ===
In 2006, Teitur returned to his native Iceland to coach KR Reykjavík to a second-place finish in Iceland's top-flight Landsbankadeild, as well as a spot in the 2006 Icelandic Cup final.

=== Vancouver Whitecaps ===
With nearly four decades of experience in European football, Teitur became the sixth head coach in the history of the Vancouver Whitecaps after signing a two-year deal with the club on 11 December 2007. He was at the helm when the Whitecaps claimed their second United Soccer League First Division championship in three seasons after a 2–1 victory over Puerto Rico Islanders on 12 October 2008. The following season Teitur made key changes to the Vancouver squad, replacing several veterans with young and experienced players. Though the Whitecaps struggled in the later part of the season, they finished in the final playoff spot and reached the final, where they faced the Montreal Impact home and away in a two-legged affair. It was the first time in USL history that two Canadian clubs would meet for the league championship. The Caps lost both fixtures, home and away, 6–3 on aggregate. On 30 November 2009 Teitur signed a one-year contract extension with the club.

On 1 September 2010, the Vancouver Whitecaps FC held a press conference where Teitur was named as the coach for the Vancouver Whitecaps' first season in Major League Soccer. After producing only one win in three months of action, Teitur was released from his contract on 30 May 2011 with Whitecaps Director of Operations Tom Soehn stepping in to replace him in the interim.

=== Barasat Euro Musketeers ===
On 15 January 2012, Cassius Management announced that Teitur would be one of six foreign coaches hired for the new league Bengal Premier League Soccer, with group stages beginning 15 March 2012. He was subsequently bought by Basarat, under the ownership of Uro Infra Reality India Ltd., for US$210,000 on 30 January 2012. After several delays due to lack of quality venues and government opposition, the project was cancelled in January 2013.

== Honours ==
=== Player ===
Íþróttabandalag Akraness

- Icelandic Championships: 1970, 1974, 1975, 1977

Östers IF

- Allsvenskan: 1978, 1980, 1981
- Svenska Cupen: 1976–77

=== Manager ===
Flora Tallinn

- Meistriliiga: 1997–98, 1998
- Estonian Cup: 1997–98
- Estonian SuperCup: 1998

Vancouver Whitecaps FC

- USL First Division: 2008

Barasat Euro Musketeers

- Bengal Premier League Soccer: 2012
