= Kenneth Nysæther =

Norwegian footballer (born 1970)

Personal information
- Date of birth: 17 February 1970 (age 56)
- Place of birth: Drammen, Norway
- Positions: Defender; striker

Senior career*
Years	Team	Apps	(Gls)
1989	Lillestrøm	12	(0)
1990	Vålerenga	22	(3)
1991	Strømsgodset	17	(2)
1992	Lillestrøm	21	(11)
1992–1994	Fortuna Sittard	32	(17)
1994–1996	Vålerenga	66	(17)
1997	HamKam	8	(1)
1997–1999	Lillestrøm	28	(1)
1999–?	Skjetten/Romerike	?	(?)
–2007	Lillestrøm 2 and 3	?	(?)
2008	Aurskog-Finstadbru	?	(?)
2009	Høland	?	(?)
2010–present	Skjetten	?	(?)
Total		206	(52)

International career
1990	Norway U21	1	(0)

Managerial career
- –2007: Lillestrøm (youth coach)
- 2008: Aurskog-Finst. (pl.asst.coach)
- 2010–present: Skjetten (head coach)
- * Club domestic league appearances and goals

Kenneth Nysæther (born 17 February 1970) is a Norwegian footballer who played as both a defender and striker.

== Career ==
Active in both Norway and the Netherlands between 1989 and 2001, Nysæther made over 200 career appearances at high levels, scoring over 50 goals. Born in Drammen, Nysæther played club football for Lillestrøm, Vålerenga, Strømsgodset, Fortuna Sittard, HamKam and Skjetten/Romerike.

He then continued his career at a lower level. He played for Skjetten now and then, before returning to the Lillestrøm system as a youth coach. Ahead of the 2008 season he left to become playing assistant coach in Aurskog-Finstadbru. In 2009, he joined local rivals Høland. After only one season he returned to Skjetten, this time as playing head coach.

He earned one cap for the Norwegian under-21 team in 1990.
