= Mike McCabe (footballer) =

Irish footballer (born 1964)

Personal information
- Date of birth: 21 August 1964 (age 62)
- Place of birth: Waterford, Ireland
- Position: Striker

Youth career
- –1983: Tottenham Hotspur

Senior career*
Years	Team	Apps	(Gls)
1984–1987	Vard		
1988–1990	Tromsø	62	(28)
1991–1992	Viking	21	(4)

Managerial career
- 1993–1995: Viking (youth)
- 1996–1997: Viking (assistant)
- 1998: Viking (youth)
- 1999–2001: Hana
- 2002: Vidar
- 2003–2004: Hundvåg
- 2005: Hana (caretaker)
- 2008: Hana
- 2009–????: Sandved
- 2013: Hundvåg
- 2018–2020: Fløya women
- 2024: Landsås women
- * Club domestic league appearances and goals

Mike McCabe (born 21 August 1964) is an Irish former footballer who played as a striker.

== Career ==
McCabe was born in Waterford, but got an apprenticeship at Tottenham Hotspur. As he was not able to get a contract with the first team, he went to Norwegian club Vard in 1984, who already had a British player Gary Chivers. In Vard, McCabe was best remembered for scoring six goals in one game in 1986.

In 1988, he signed for Norwegian side Tromsø IL. He was described as a club "hero". In 1990 he became third top goalscorer in the league, only behind Tore André Dahlum and Jahn Ivar Jakobsen. In 1991, he signed for Viking FK. He became league champion in 1991, but had to retire in 1992 due to problems with his back.

McCabe mainly operated as a striker. He operated as a defensive midfielder while playing for Norwegian side Viking FK.

== Managerial career ==
McCabe was hired as Viking's U20 coach in 1993, and led the team to victory in the 1995 Norwegian Junior Cup. In 1996 and 1997 he was assistant manager of Viking under Poul Erik Andreasen, before reverting to U20 coach in 1998.

After the 1998 season, he left Viking to take over his first senior team, 3. divisjon club Hana IL. Ahead of the 2002 season he moved on to 2. divisjon team FK Vidar, taking over for Gaute Johannessen with the clear ambition to win promotion to the second tier. One year was enough for McCabe, who claimed he was pressured for time, and took over the smaller Stavanger club Hundvåg FK. The ambition there was to overtake Vidar as the second largest team in Stavanger. He was relieved of the position in September 2004, with Hundvåg hiring a caretaker manager.

McCabe himself became caretaker of Hana in late 2005, and was hired as their first-team coach once again ahead of the 2008 season. Following a promotion to the 2009 3. divisjon, McCabe left. He signed for another 3. divisjon club, Sandved IL. In 2013 he returned to Hundvåg, in order to take over for Bjarte Lunde Aarsheim who wished to step down to assistant manager. This spell lasted until July 2013.

Ahead of the 2018 season, McCabe was announced as manager of IF Fløya's women's team, moving back to Tromsø 27 years after he left the city. He led the team to victory in the 2019 Norwegian First Division, losing the playoff against Lyn. Ahead of the 2024 season, McCabe was announced as manager of the newly established women's team of FK Landsås in Harstad, but decided to move from Harstad and resigned before the league commenced.

== Personal life ==
McCabe has two children.
