= Roar Pedersen =

Norwegian ice hockey player

Personal information
- Born: 24 November 1927 Drammen, Norway
- Died: 9 November 1989 (aged 61) Oslo, Norway

Sport
- Sport: Ice hockey

Roar Pedersen Bakke (24 November 1927 – 9 November 1989) was a Norwegian ice hockey player, born in Drammen, Norway. He played for the Norwegian national ice hockey team, and participated at the Winter Olympics in 1952, where the Norwegian team placed 9th.
