= Bjarni Sigurðsson =

Icelandic footballer

Personal information
- Full name: Bjarni Sigurðsson
- Date of birth: 16 October 1960 (age 66)
- Place of birth: Iceland
- Position: Goalkeeper

Senior career*
| Years | Team | Apps | (Gls) |
| 1977–1978 | Keflavík ÍF | 2 | (0) |
| 1979–1984 | ÍA | 85 | (0) |
| 1985–1988 | SK Brann | 86 | (0) |
| 1989–1993 | Valur | 70 | (0) |
| 1994 | SK Brann | 19 | (0) |
| 1995–1997 | Stjarnan | 34 | (0) |

International career
| 1977 | Iceland U17 | 2 | (0) |
| 1977 | Iceland U19 | 4 | (0) |
| 1980 | Iceland U21 | 1 | (0) |
| 1980–1991 | Iceland | 41 | (0) |
- * Club domestic league appearances and goals

Bjarni Sigurðsson (born 16 October 1960) is an Icelandic former international footballer who played as a goalkeeper. He won 41 caps for the Iceland national football team between 1980 and 1991. He started his career with Keflavik ÍF before joining ÍA in 1979. In 1984, Bjarni was awarded club sportsman of the year by ÍA. After spending five years in Akranes, he moved to Norway to sign for SK Brann. Bjarni went on to make 86 league appearances for Brann before returning to Iceland with Valur in 1989. He had a second spell with Brann during the 1994 season, playing 19 games in total. In September 1994 he conceded nine goals in the defeat to Rosenborg BK, but was still said to have played well throughout the match. He signed for Stjarnan in 1995 and played three seasons with the club, making 34 league appearances, before retiring from football in 1997.

In November 2007, Bjarni was appointed goalkeeping coach for the Iceland national team.
