= Jan Halvor Halvorsen =

Norwegian footballer and manager (born 1963)

Personal information
- Date of birth: 8 March 1963 (age 63)
- Place of birth: Bamble Municipality, Norway
- Height: 1.85 m (6 ft 1 in)
- Position: Defender

Senior career*
| Years | Team | Apps | (Gls) |
| –1982 | Pors | | |
| 1983–1985 | Eik-Tønsberg | 47 | (1) |
| 1986 | Jerv | | |
| 1987–1988 | Brann | 42 | (1) |
| 1989 | Start | 8 | (0) |
| 1989–1992 | Hertha BSC | 74 | (5) |
| 1992–1994 | AGF Aarhus | 67 | (1) |
| 1994 | Sogndal | 11 | (0) |
| 1995–1996 | Rosenborg | 0 | (0) |
| 1996 | Byåsen | | |

International career
| 1982–1983 | Norway U21 | 7 | (1) |
| 1989 | Norway B | 1 | (0) |
| 1989–1990 | Norway | 5 | (0) |

Managerial career
- 1996–1998: Byåsen
- 1999–2002: Start
- 2003–2004: Sogndal
- 2005: GIF Sundsvall
- 2006–2009: Notodden
- 2011–2012: New York Red Bulls (assistant)
- 2013–2015: Bodø/Glimt
- 2016: Fredrikstad
- 2018–2021: Bryne
- 2022–2025: Lyn
- * Club domestic league appearances and goals

Jan Halvor Halvorsen (born 8 March 1963) is a former Norwegian football player and manager.

== Club career ==
Halvorsen started his youth career in Pors, debuting at the age of fifteen and a half. He has also played for clubs like Brann, Rosenborg and Hertha Berlin. In 1992, he became Danish cup winner playing for AGF Aarhus.

== National team ==
Halvorsen has five caps for the Norwegian national team.

== Managerial career ==
Since 1996 Halvorsen has worked as football manager, managing top teams from Norway and Sweden. In 1999, he took over as manager for Start and led the club to promotion to the Norwegian Premier League. In 2000, he led the recently promoted side to the semi-finals of the Norwegian Football Cup. After being relegated to Adeccoligaen, he once again led the club to promotion back to the Norwegian Premier League in 2001.

In 2003, he joined Sogndal and helped the club to an 8th-place finish in his first season in charge of the Norwegian Premier League side. In November 2005, he signed a contract with Notodden, bringing them up from the Norwegian Second Division up to Adeccoligaen, the second highest level in Norway. He remained with Notodden thru 2009.

During October 2010 it was reported that Halvorsen would be joining New York Red Bulls during the 2011 season to serve as the club's assistant manager under Hans Backe. This move reunited Halvorsen with former Start boss Erik Solér who was in charge of New York at the time. His sons, Torben and Jonas also played on the Red Bulls youth teams. On 17 January 2011 it was officially announced that Halvorsen would join New York Red Bulls as an assistant coach.

Halvorsen signed a three-year contract with the Norwegian First Division side Bodø/Glimt ahead of the 2013 season, and replaced Cato Hansen as head coach and stated that the goal was to win promotion to Tippeligaen. And on his first attempt, he managed just that.

=== Managerial statistics ===
As of 25 May 2025.

| Team | From | To | Record | | | | |
| Team | From | To | G | W | D | L | Win % |
|---|---|---|---|---|---|---|---|
| Start | 1 January 1999 | 31 July 2002 | 95 | 37 | 26 | 32 | 38.95 |
| Sogndal | 1 January 2003 | 26 November 2004 | 52 | 14 | 15 | 23 | 26.92 |
| GIF Sundsvall | 28 November 2004 | 14 August 2005 | 18 | 3 | 5 | 10 | 16.67 |
| Notodden FK | 1 January 2006 | 14 August 2009 | 104 | 45 | 24 | 35 | 43.27 |
| Bodø/Glimt | 19 December 2012 | 16 November 2015 | 90 | 43 | 13 | 34 | 47.78 |
| Fredrikstad | 23 November 2015 | 9 August 2016 | 19 | 4 | 5 | 10 | 21.05 |
| Bryne | 30 October 2018 | 31 December 2021 | 46 | 22 | 12 | 12 | 47.83 |
| Lyn | 1 Januar 2022 | 2 June 2025 | 95 | 57 | 17 | 21 | 60.00 |
| Total | | | 519 | 225 | 117 | 177 | 43.35 |

== Honours ==
- Danish Cup: 1991–92
