= Gøran Sørloth =

Norwegian footballer (born 1962)

Personal information
- Full name: Gøran Sørloth
- Date of birth: 16 July 1962 (age 64)
- Place of birth: Kristiansund, Norway
- Height: 1.81 m (5 ft 11 in)
- Position: Striker

Youth career
- 1979–1981: Rissa

Senior career*
Years	Team	Apps	(Gls)
1981–1984	Strindheim	0	(0)
1985–1989	Rosenborg	83	(30)
1989	Borussia Mönchengladbach	5	(0)
1989–1993	Rosenborg	91	(44)
1993–1994	Bursaspor	24	(4)
1994–1995	Viking	35	(7)
Total		238	(85)

International career
1985–1994	Norway	55	(15)
- * Club domestic league appearances and goals

Gøran Sørloth (born 16 July 1962) is a Norwegian former footballer. He was one of the best strikers in Norwegian football during the late eighties and early nineties.

== Club career ==
In the Norwegian top division he scored 74 goals in 174 matches for Rosenborg, with whom he won five league championships.

Sørloth joined Rosenborg from Strindheim in 1985. Two years later he moved to Borussia Mönchengladbach in Germany, but the spell was unsuccessful and hence short, and Sørloth returned to Rosenborg. In 1993, he once again tried his luck abroad, in Turkish club Bursaspor, but he left in 1994 to play for Viking for the remainder of his career.

== International career ==
In addition, Sørloth scored 15 goals in 55 matches for Norway. Sørloth was a part of the Norwegian 1994 FIFA World Cup squad, and played one match during the tournament. This was his last international match.

== Personal life ==
His son Alexander is also a professional footballer.

== Career statistics ==
=== International ===
Appearances and goals by national team and year
National team	Year	Apps	Goals
Norway	1985	1	0
Norway	1986	4	0
Norway	1987	4	0
Norway	1988	8	4
Norway	1989	9	3
Norway	1990	5	2
Norway	1991	9	1
Norway	1992	9	4
Norway	1993	3	1
Norway	1994	3	0
Total		55	15

Scores and results list Norway's goal tally first, score column indicates score after each Sørloth goal.

List of international goals scored by Gøran Sørloth
No.	Date	Venue	Opponent	Score	Result	Competition	Ref.
1	9 August 1988	Ullevaal Stadion, Oslo, Norway	Bulgaria	1–0	1–1	Friendly	
2	2 November 1988	Tsirio Stadium, Limassol, Cyprus	Cyprus	1–0	3–0	1990 FIFA World Cup qualification	
3	2 November 1988	Tsirio Stadium, Limassol, Cyprus	Cyprus	2–0	3–0	1990 FIFA World Cup qualification	
4	4 November 1988	Tehelné pole, Bratislava, Czechoslovakia	Czechoslovakia	1–2	2–3	Friendly	
5	22 February 1989	Olympic Stadium, Athens, Greece	Greece	2–4	2–4	Friendly	
6	21 May 1989	Ullevaal Stadion, Oslo, Norway	Cyprus	2–0	3–1	1990 FIFA World Cup qualification	
7	25 October 1989	Mohammed Al-Hamad Stadium, Hawally, Kuwait	Kuwait	1–2	2–2	Friendly	
8	31 October 1990	Bislett Stadium, Oslo, Norway	Cameroon	6–0	6–1	Friendly	
9	14 November 1990	Makario Stadium, Nicosia, Cyprus	Cyprus	1–0	3–0	UEFA Euro 1992 qualifying	
10	1 May 1991	Ullevaal Stadion, Oslo, Norway	Cyprus	3–0	3–0	UEFA Euro 1992 qualifying	
11	13 May 1992	Ullevaal Stadion, Oslo, Norway	Faroe Islands	1–0	2–0	Friendly	
12	9 September 1992	Ullevaal Stadion, Oslo, Norway	San Marino	3–0	10–0	1994 FIFA World Cup qualification	
13	9 September 1992	Ullevaal Stadion, Oslo, Norway	San Marino	4–0	10–0	1994 FIFA World Cup qualification	
14	23 September 1992	Ullevaal Stadion, Oslo, Norway	Netherlands	2–1	2–1	1994 FIFA World Cup qualification	
15	10 February 1993	Estádio de São Luís, Faro, Portugal	Portugal	1–1	1–1	Friendly	

== Honours ==
Rosenborg

- Eliteserien: 1985, 1988, 1990, 1992, 1993
- Norwegian Cup: 1988, 1990, 1992

Individual

- Kniksen Striker of the Year: 1991, 1992
