= Per Egil Ahlsen =

Norwegian footballer (born 1958)

Personal information
- Full name: Per Egil Ahlsen
- Date of birth: 4 March 1958 (age 68)
- Place of birth: Fredrikstad, Norway
- Height: 1.80 m (5 ft 11 in)
- Position: Defensive midfielder

Youth career
- Fredrikstad

Senior career*
| Years | Team | Apps | (Gls) |
| 1976–1986 | Fredrikstad | 183 | (28) |
| 1987–1990 | Brann | 78 | (2) |
| 1990–1991 | → Fortuna Düsseldorf (loan) | 11 | (0) |
| 1991–1992 | Brann | 42 | (3) |
| 1993–1994 | Fredrikstad | 42 | (12) |

International career
| 1983–1992 | Norway | 54 | (3) |
- * Club domestic league appearances and goals

Per Egil Ahlsen (born 4 March 1958) is a Norwegian former footballer. Ahlsen started as a midfielder, but was later re-educated as a forward defender. He was known for his long-shots.

== Club career ==
Ahlsen started his career at the senior level with Fredrikstad FK in the middle of the 1970s. He won the cup trophy with Fredrikstad in 1984, thanks to his fantastic free kick goal from 35 meters – a goal that is often considered the most beautiful goal in Norwegian football. In 1987, he transferred to S.K. Brann where he played for six seasons, a part from a short loan period to German Fortuna Düsseldorf. Ahlsen became an iconic figure in S.K. Brann. He was looked upon as a saviour because he put a stop to the "elevator era" in S.K. Brann. He finished his career back in Fredrikstad, where he is now the assistant coach.

== International career ==
He made his debut for the Norwegian national team in 1983 and earned 54 caps, scoring three goals.

Ahlsen was also a member of the Norwegian team competing at the 1984 Summer Olympics in Los Angeles, California.
