= 1965 in Norway =

- Centuries: 18th; 19th; 20th; 21st
- Decades: 1940s; 1950s; 1960s; 1970s; 1980s
- See also: List of years in Norway

Events in the year 1965 in Norway.

== Incumbents ==
- Monarch – Olav V.
- President of the Storting –
- Prime Minister – Einar Gerhardsen (Labour Party)

From 12 October:

- Prime Minister – Per Borten (Centre Party)

== Events ==
- 4 February-1 April – the "Grenade Man", an unidentified person whom placed grenades and grenade traps in several places in Oslo, spreads fear in Oslo. The case remained unsolved despite the huge media coverage and public interest in the matter.
- 13 September – The 1965 Parliamentary election takes place.
- 12 October – Per Borten becomes Prime Minister of Norway
- 12 October – Borten's Cabinet was appointed.
- Norsk Hydro joins Elf Aquitaine and six other French companies to form Petronord to perform search for oil and gas in the North Sea.

== Popular culture ==
=== Music ===
- Kirsti Sparboe wins the Melodi Grand Prix, singing "Karusell" by Jolly Kramer-Johansen.

=== Literature ===
==== Novels ====
- Bergljot Hobæk Haff – Skjøgens bok
- Alfred Hauge – Cleng Peerson: ankerfeste
- Harald Sverdrup – Negeren og solsikken

==== Drama ====
- Jens Bjørneboe – Til lykke med dagen

==== Poetry ====
- Peter R. Holm – Øyeblikkets forvandlinger

== Notable births ==
=== January ===
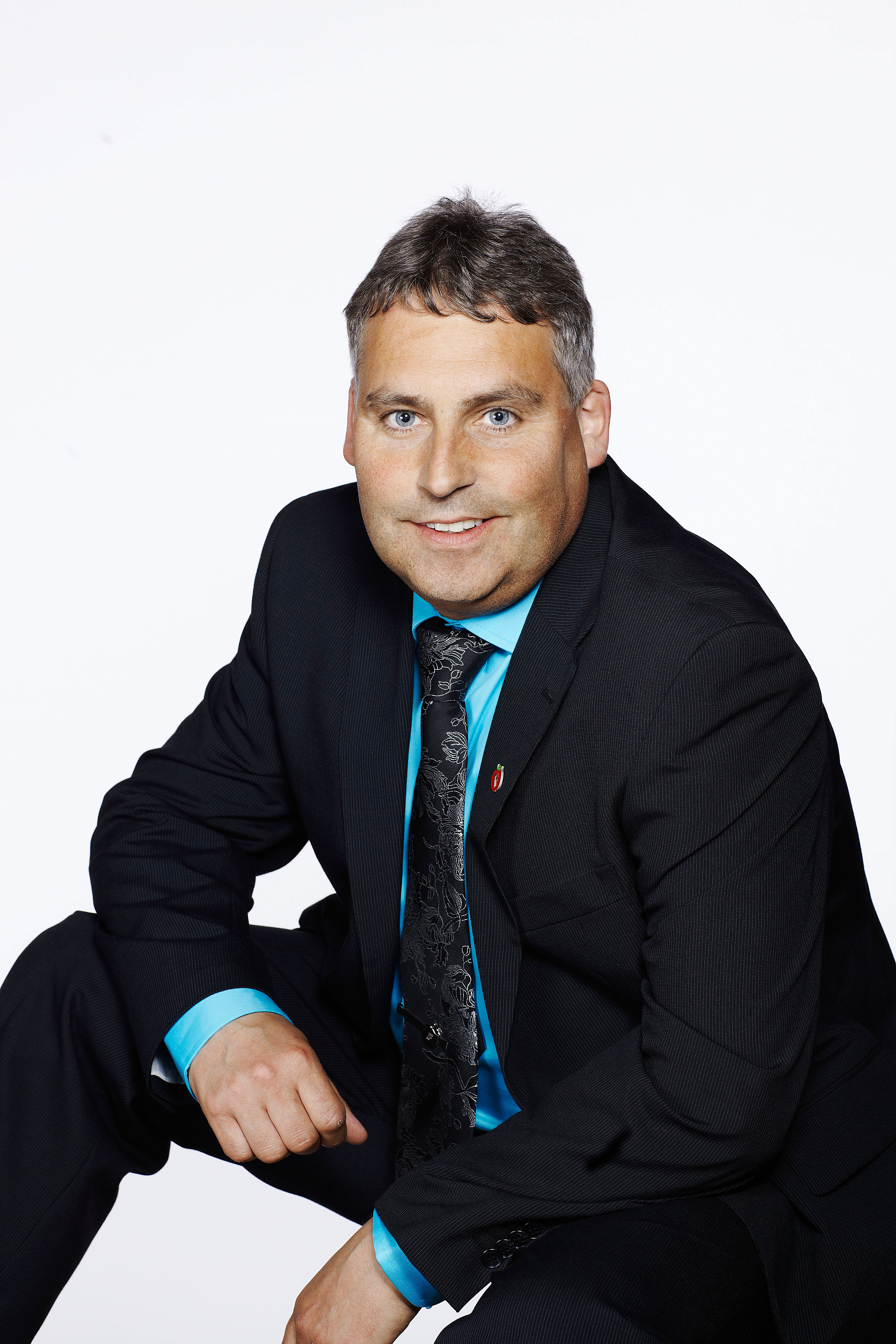
Torgeir Trældal

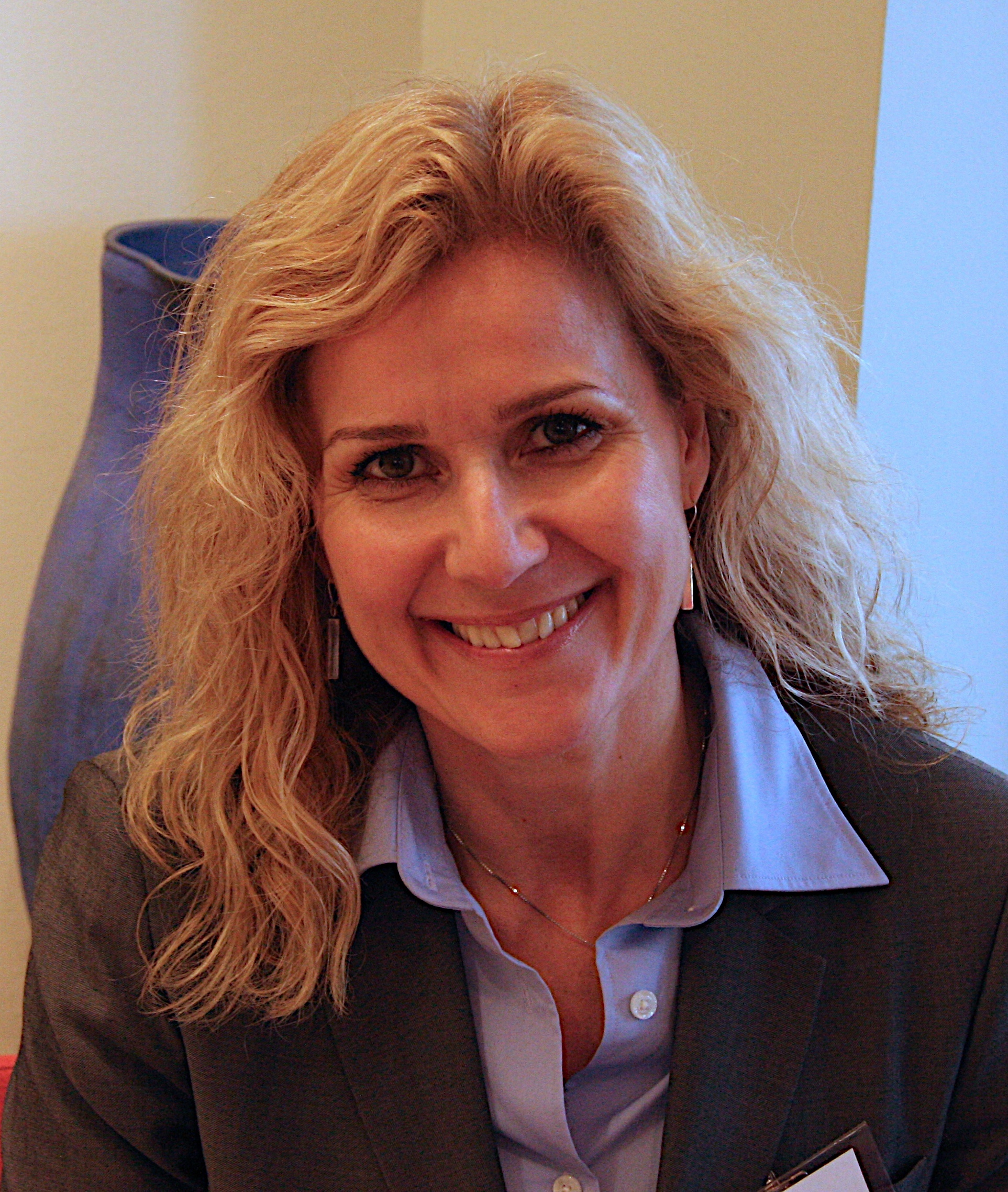
Karita Bekkemellem

- 2 January
  - Petter Bjørheim, politician.
  - Torgeir Trældal, politician.
- 3 January – Sverre Istad, biathlete.
- 6 January
  - Marianne Dahlmo, cross-country skier.
  - Inger Lise Hegge, cross-country skier.
- 9 January – Erling Aas-Eng, politician.
- 15 January
  - Karita Bekkemellem, politician.
  - Marius Holst, film director.
- 18 January
  - Lasse Arnesen, alpine skier.
  - Magne Johansen, ski jumper.
- 19 January – Mette Halvorsen, curler.
- 31 January – Christian Styren, diver.

=== February ===
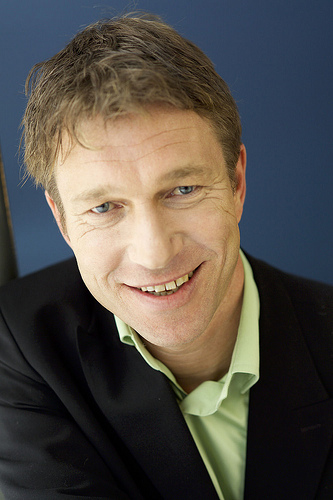
Terje Aasland

- 2 February – Morten Viskum, painter.
- 3 February – Terje Langli, cross-country skier.
- 4 February – Stig Henrik Hoff, actor.
- 13 February – Ole Mathisen, jazz musician.
- 15 February – Terje Aasland, politician.
- 17 February
  - Cathrin Bretzeg, politician.
  - Øyvind Slåke, politician.
- 18 February – Aage Thor Falkanger, judge.
- 19 February – Arne Johan Almeland, sprint canoer.
- 26 February – Erik Bjørkum, sailor.
- 27 February – Beret Bråten, politician.

=== March ===
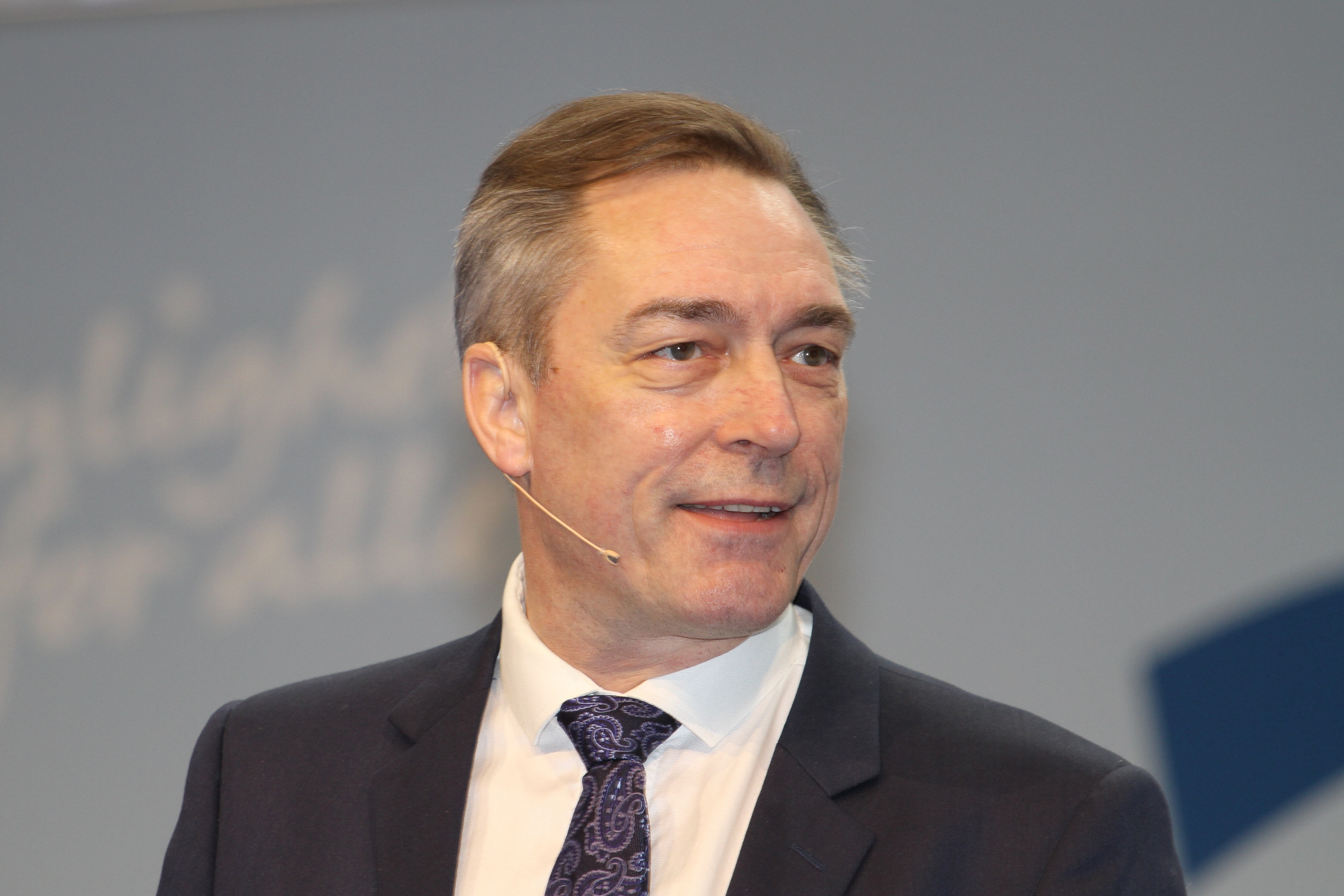
Frank Bakke-Jensen

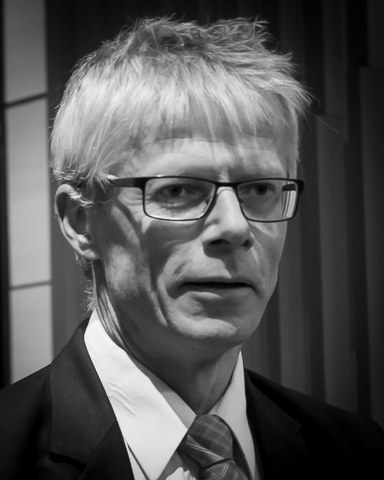
Hans Christian Holte

- 1 March – Odd Henriksen, politician.
- 4 March – Wenche Lægraid, sprint canoer.
- 8 March – Frank Bakke-Jensen, politician.
- 10 March
  - Inge Ludvigsen, footballer.
  - Tove Elise Madland, politician.
- 11 March
  - Hans Christian Holte, civil servant.
  - Petter Salsten, ice hockey player.
- 13 March – Frode Granhus, crime fiction writer (died 2017).
- 14 March – Marita Fossum, writer.
- 23 March – Trine Haltvik, handball player.
- 24 March – Terje Breivik, politician.
- 25 March – Per Edmund Mordt, footballer.
- 31 March – Ragnhild Bente Andersen, orienteering competitor.

=== April ===
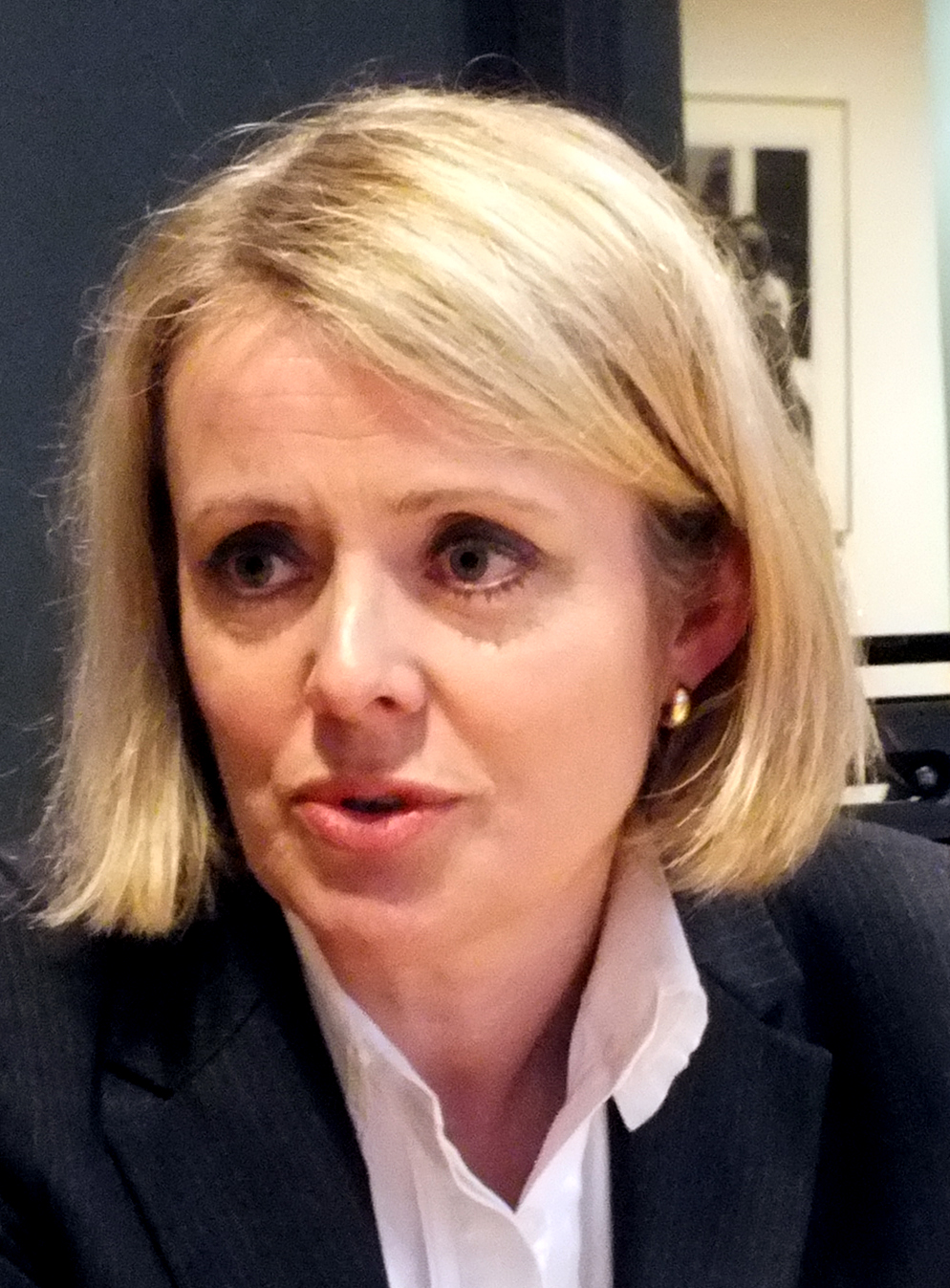
Benedicte Bjørnland

- 8 April – Steinar Karlstrøm, politician.
- 15 April
  - Ole Christian Eidhammer, ski jumper.
  - Lars Arvid Nilsen, shot putter.
- 17 April – Robert Stoltenberg, actor and comedian.
- 20 April – Ivan Enstad, rower.
- 24 April – Marit Reiersgård, crime writer.
- 30 April – Benedicte Bjørnland, jurist and civil servant.

=== May ===
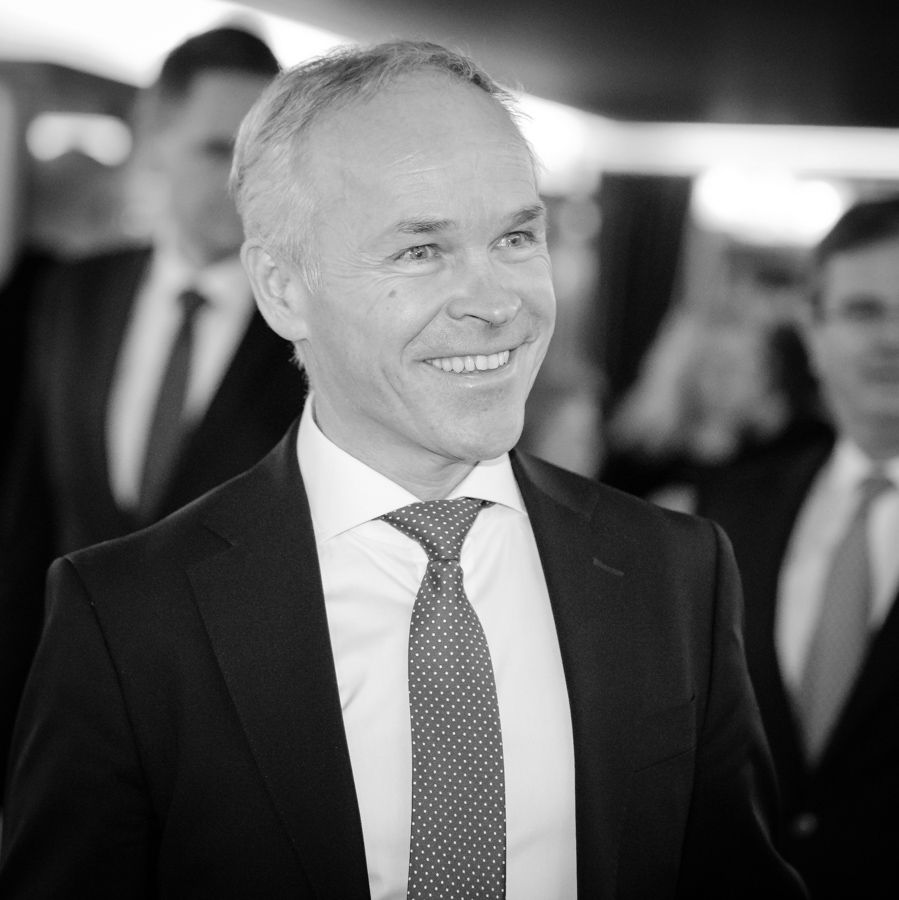
Jan Tore Sanner

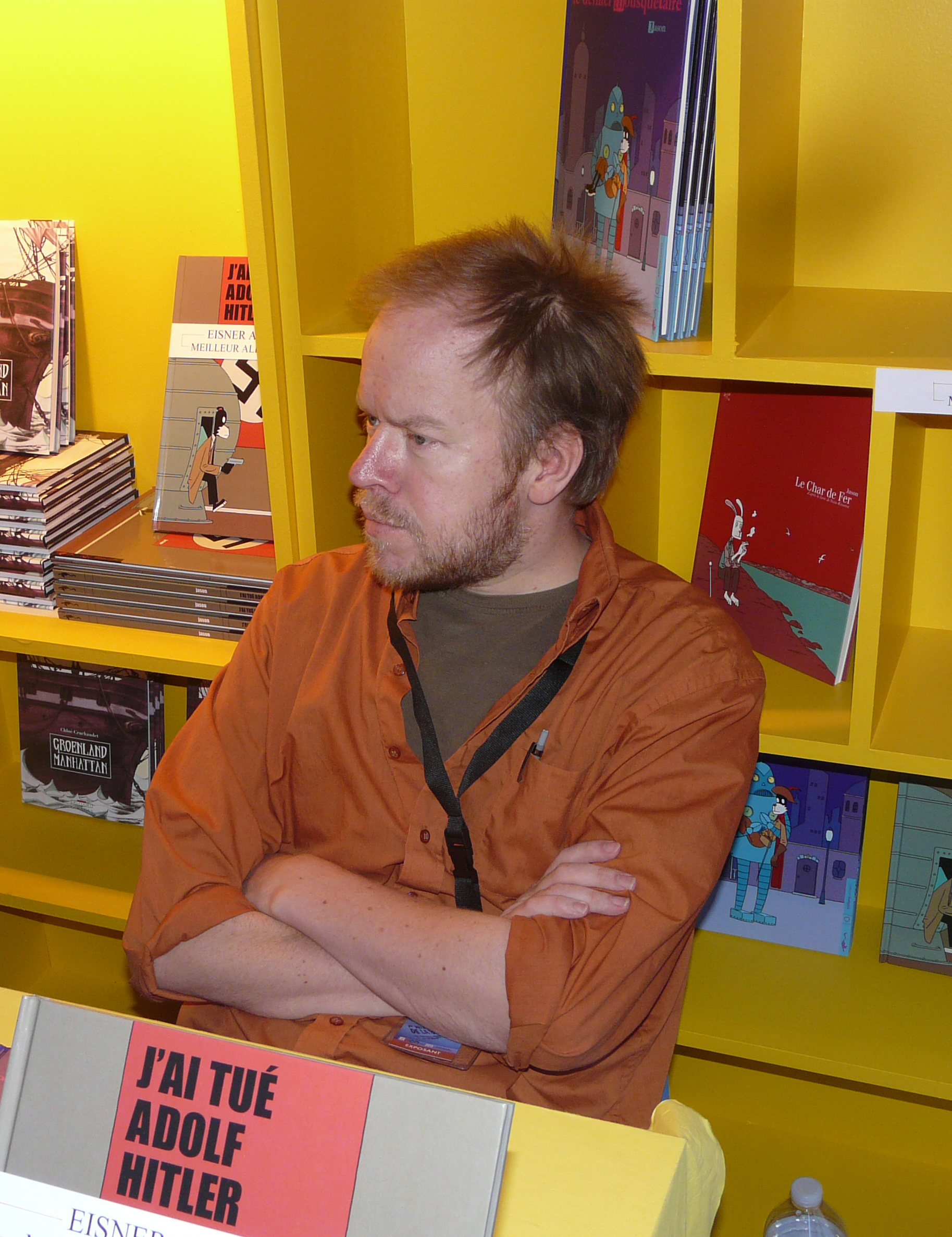
Jason

- 3 May – Stein Erik Lauvås, politician.
- 4 May – Marit Elveos, cross-country skier.
- 5 May – May Grethe Lerum, writer, journalist and literary critic.
- 6 May – Jan Tore Sanner, politician.
- 8 May – Hans Engelsen Eide, freestyle skier.
- 15 May – Geir Axelsen, economist and civil servant.
- 16 May
  - Thomas Gill, footballer.
  - John Arne "Jason" Sæterøy, cartoonist.
- 21 May – Liv Kari Eskeland, politician.
- 23 May – Jon Inge Kjørum, ski jumper.
- 28 May – Stein Rønning, karateka (died 2008).
- 31 May – Ellen Alfsen, politician

=== June ===
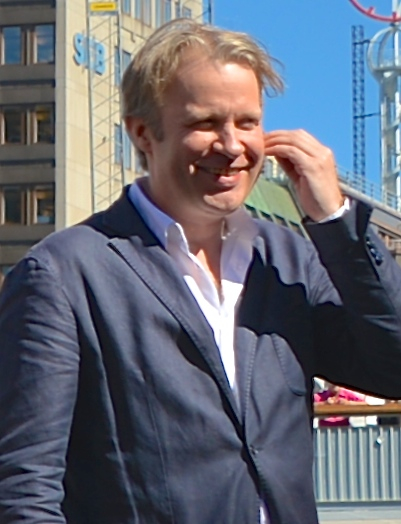
Eirik Stubø

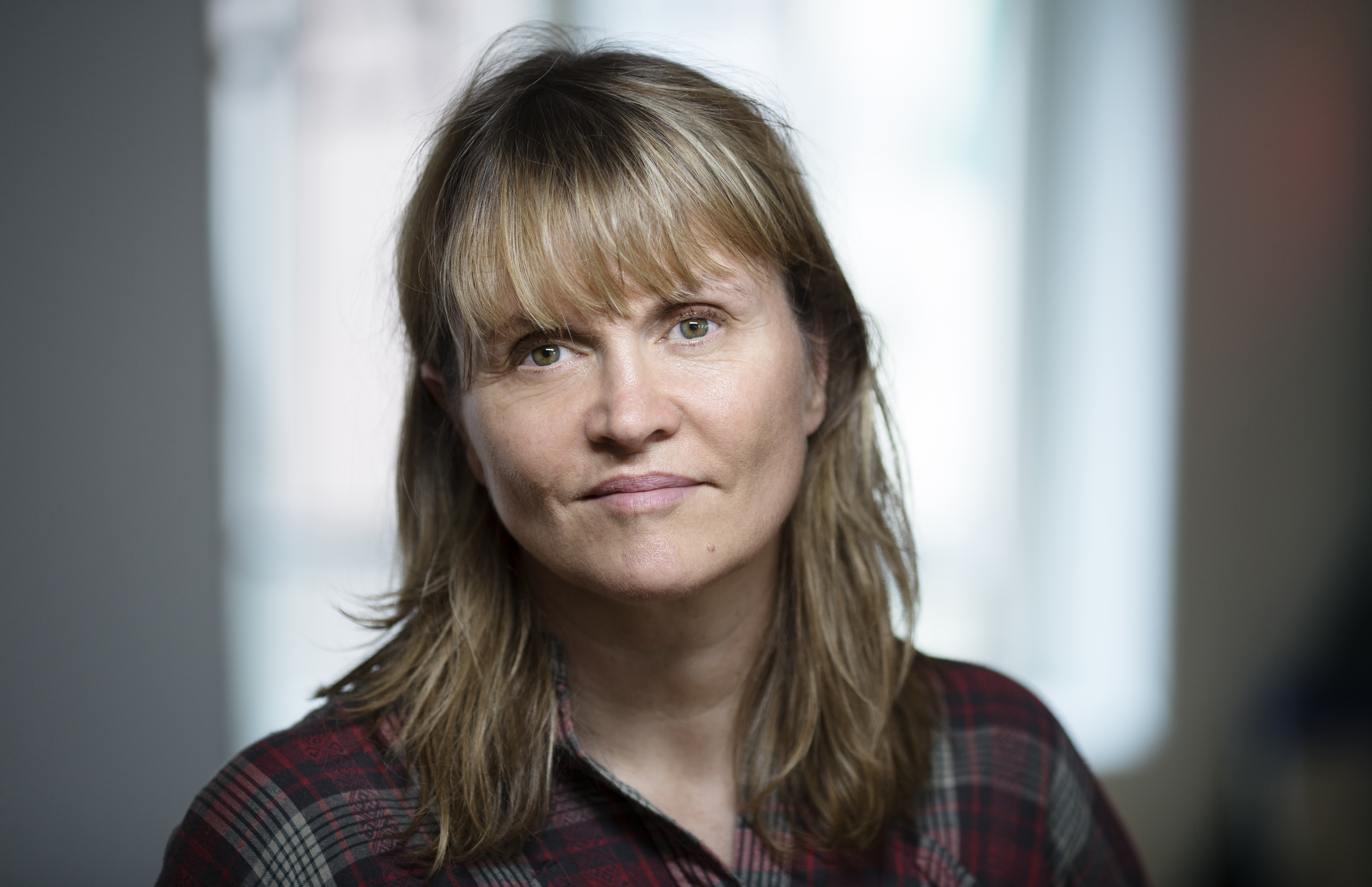
Nina Lykke

- 6 June
  - Erik Fosnes Hansen, writer.
  - Roger Kjendalen, handball player.
- 9 June – Helge Sunde, composer and musician.
- 14 June – Siri Landsem, sport shooter.
- 16 June
  - Karl-Einar Jensen, sailor.
  - Eirik Stubø, stage producer and theatre director.
- 17 June
  - Nina Lykke, writer.
  - Linda Medalen, footballer.
- 18 June – Anne Tingelstad Wøien, politician.
- 26 June – Rune Brynhildsen, businessperson

=== July ===
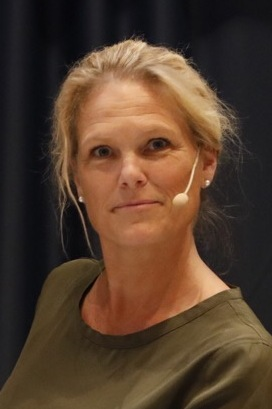
Ingvil Smines Tybring-Gjedde

- 2 July – Harald Zwart, film director
- 2 July – Fredrik Sejersted, jurist, and Attorney General of Norway.
- 4 July – Erik Johnsen, ski jumper.
- 8 July – Ingvil Smines Tybring-Gjedde, politician.
- 10 July – Paul Chaffey, politician.
- 16 July – Morten Høglund, politician.
- 24 July – Merete Morken Andersen, author, literature critic and editor
- 26 July – Håkon Wium Lie, Chief Technology Officer
- 27 July – Kari Raustein, politician.

=== August ===
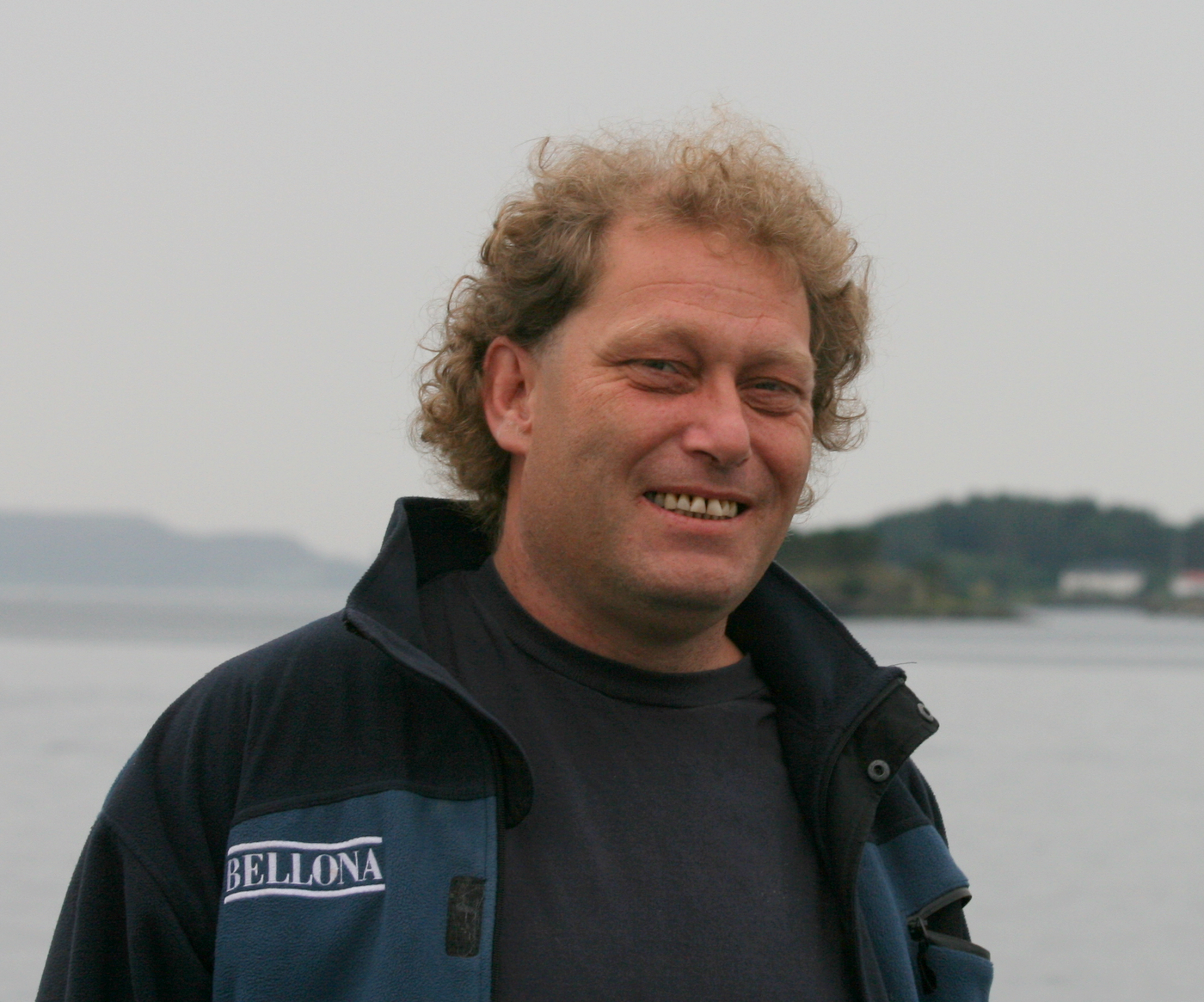
Frederic Hauge

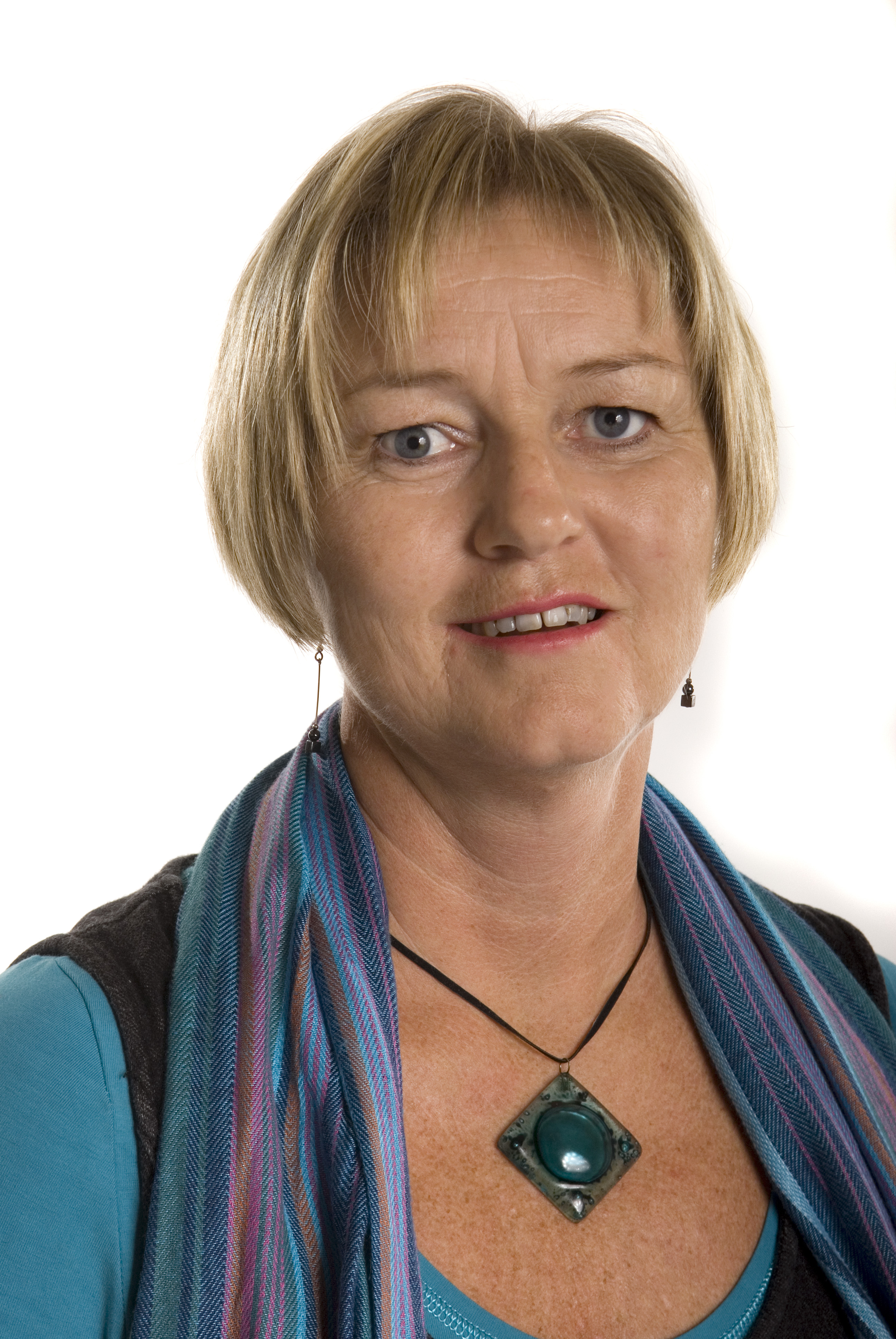
Gro Skartveit

- 1 August – Tore Kallstad, footballer.
- 8 August – Tor Skeie, freestyle skier.
- 11 August
  - Gunnar Halle, footballer.
  - Geir Thoresen, politician.
- 15 August
  - Frederic Hauge, environmental activist.
  - Ove Bernt Trellevik, politician.
- 16 August – Hanne Dyveke Søttar, politician.
- 17 August – Per Joar Hansen, footballer and manager.
- 18 August – Jørgen Langhelle, actor (died 2021).
- 24 August – Gro Skartveit, politician.
- 25 August – Tore Øvrebø, rower.
- 27 August – André N. Skjelstad, politician.
- 28 August – Olav Akselsen, politician (died 2021).
- 29 August – Geir-Inge Sivertsen, engineer and politician.

=== September ===
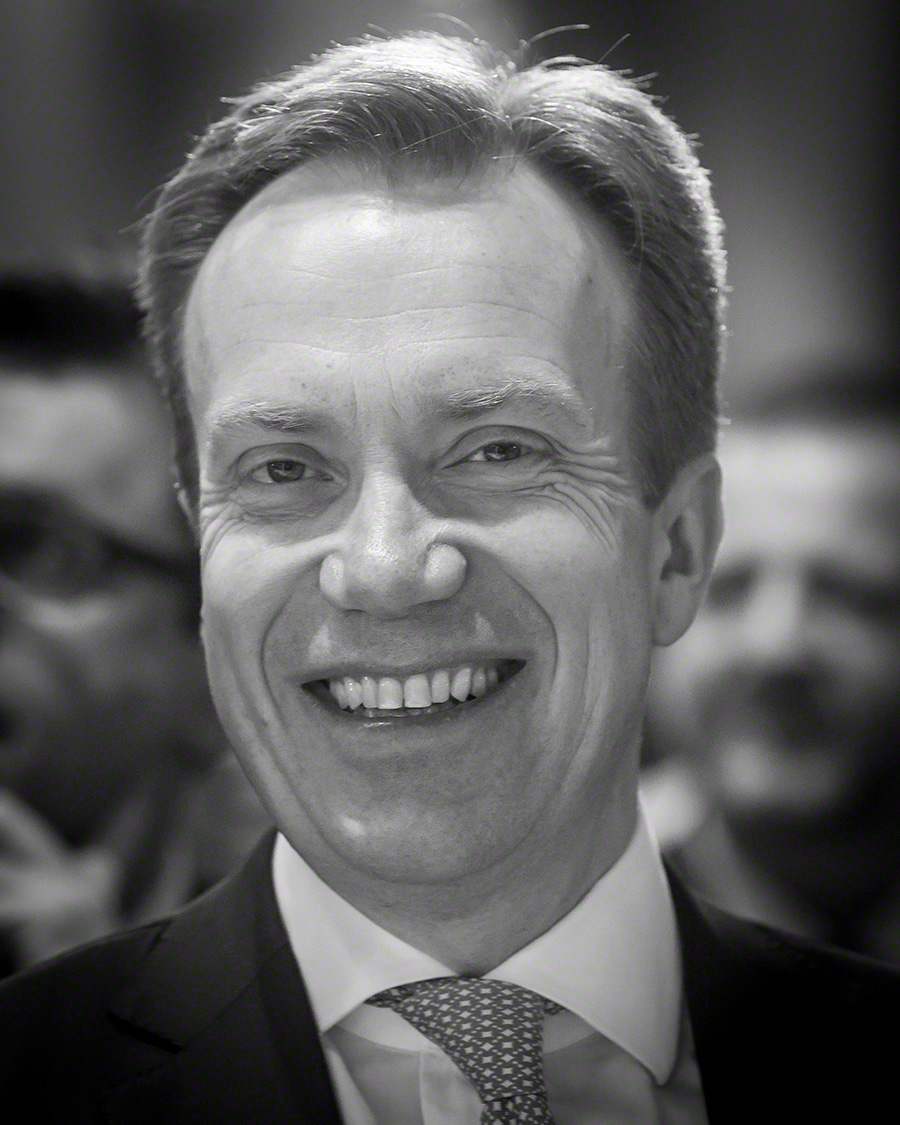
Børge Brende

- 6 September – Solveig Pedersen, cross-sountry skier.
- 13 September – Alexandra Bech Gjørv, lawyer and businesswoman.
- 15 September – Frank Willy Larsen, politician.
- 20 September – Ellen Arnstad, editor.
- 25 September
  - Børge Brende, politician.
  - Jan Erik Fåne, politician.
- 29 September – Nikolaj Frobenius, novelist and screenwriter.

=== October ===
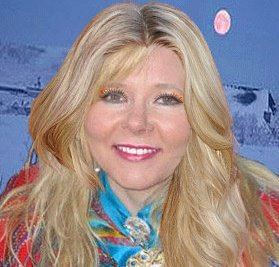
Sollaug Sárgon

- 12 October – Jan-Erick Olsen, swimmer.
- 13 October – Erlend Larsen, politician.
- 16 October – Espen Egil Hansen, newspaper editor and publisher.
- 20 October – Sollaug Sárgon, poet.

=== November ===
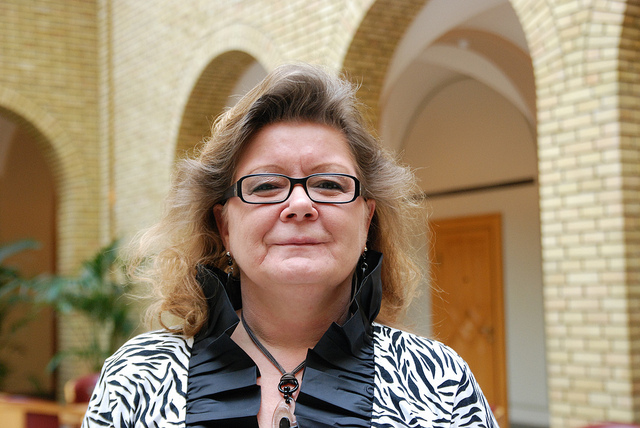
Wenche Olsen

- 1 November – Hallgeir Finbråten, footballer.
- 8 November – Mini Jakobsen, footballer.
- 11 November – Kåre Ingebrigtsen, footballer and manager.
- 16 November – Lars Moldestad, footballer.
- 18 November – Martin Friis, ice hockey player.
- 20 November – Sissel Knutsen Hegdal, politician.
- 24 November – Lars Rønningen, wrestler.
- 30 November
  - Wenche Olsen, politician.
  - Morten Strøksnes, journalist and non-fiction writer.

=== December ===
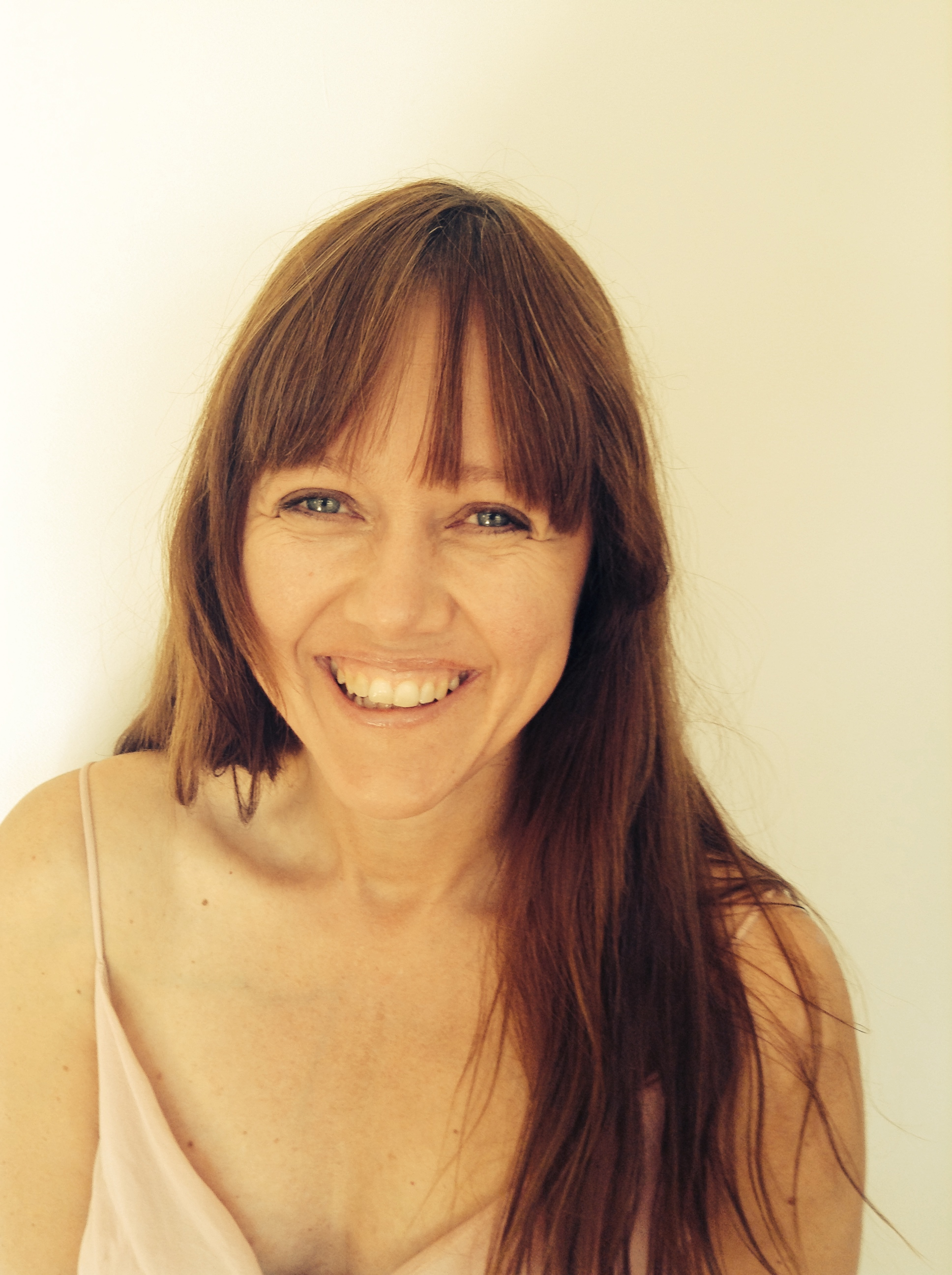
Iren Reppen

- 19 December – Iren Reppen, actress.
- 21 December – Frank Rossavik, journalist and non-fiction writer.
- 24 December – André Nieuwlaat, footballer.
- 24 December – Steinulf Tungesvik, jurist and politician.
- 27 December – Åsleik Engmark, comedian and actor (died 2017).
- 31 December – Maria Sødahl, film director and screenwriter.

=== Full date missing ===
- Heidi Heggenes, civil servant.
- Johannes Hjellbrekke, sociologist
- Geir Lysne, jazz musician.
- Cathrine Rasmussen, businesswoman and equestrian.

== Notable deaths ==
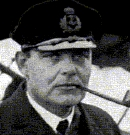
Hjalmar Riiser-Larsen

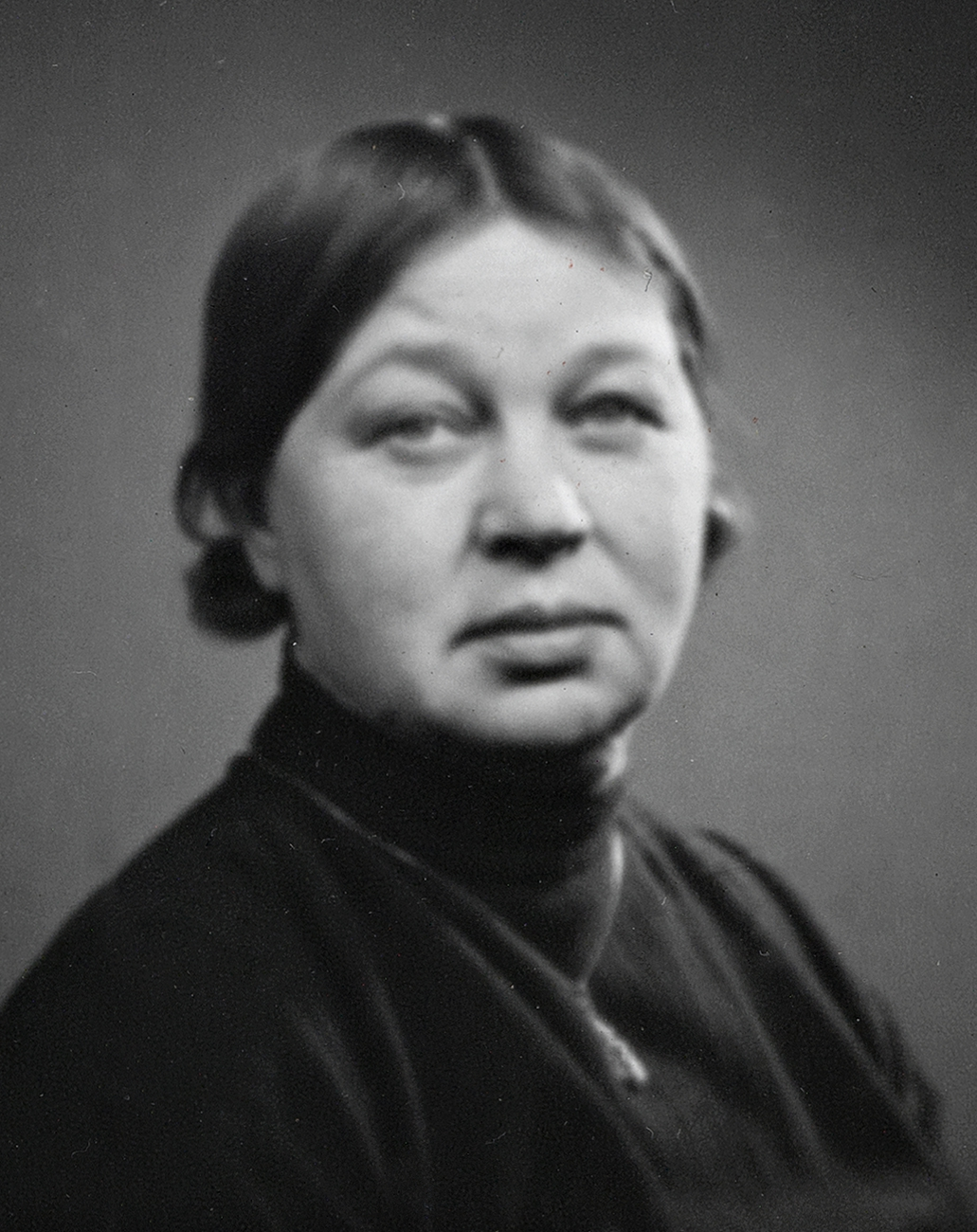
Aslaug Vaa

- 4 January – Ragnvald Winjum, jurist and politician (b. 1917).
- 7 January – Arthur Nordlie, politician (b. 1883).
- 9 January – Ole Bergesen, politician (b. 1916)
- 9 January – Erik Haugland, painter and sculptor (b. 1894).
- 11 January – Arne Bjørndal, fiddler (b. 1882).
- 1 February – Einar Berntsen, speed skater and yacht racer (b. 1891).
- 1 February – Johan Scharffenberg, physician and writer (b. 1869).
- 2 February – Rolf Johannessen, footballer (b. 1910).
- 5 February – Rolf Lefdahl, gymnast (b. 1882).
- 6 February – Bjarne Henry Henriksen, politician (b. 1904).
- 18 February – Ragnar Hargreaves, yacht racer (b. 1907).
- 21 February – Aage Rosenqvist Pran, military officer (b. 1899).
- 22 February – Nanna With, editor and publisher (b. 1874).
- 23 February – Johannes Hygen, dean (b. 1876).
- 1 March – Edvard Welle-Strand, journalist (b. 1884).
- 3 March – Per Krohg, artist (b. 1889).
- 9 March – Torvald Haavardstad, politician (b. 1893).
- 10 March – Hans Gabrielsen, county governor (b. 1891).
- 14 March – Johan Beronka, priest and writer (b. 1885).
- 22 March – Herbrand Lavik, theatre critic and writer (b. 1901).
- 2 April – Jens Hundseid, Prime Minister (b. 1883).
- 3 April – Gudbrand Skatteboe, sport shooter (b. 1875).
- 15 April – Lauritz Bergendahl, Nordic combined skier (b. 1887).
- 19 April – Olaf Lange, painter and graphic designer (b. 1875).
- 23 April – Haldor Andreas Haldorsen, politician and industrialist (b. 1883).
- 28 April – Ingvald Møllerstad, photographer (b. 1893).
- 29 April – Finn Münster, gymnast (b. 1887).
- 6 May – Jens Bache-Wiig, industrialist (b. 1880).
- 7 May – Alf Bjørnskau Bastiansen, priest and politician (b. 1883).
- 15 May – Olav Skard, horticulturalist (b. 1881).
- 15 May – Hans Beyer, gymnast (b. 1889).
- 23 May – Helge Klæstad, Supreme Court justice (b. 1885).
- 25 May – Nils Tvedt, sport diver (b. 1883).
- 3 June – Hjalmar Riiser-Larsen, aviator, polar explorer and businessman (b. 1890, died in Denmark).
- 4 June – Sigmund Mowinckel, theologian (b. 1884).
- 16 June – Agnes Steineger, painter (b. 1863).
- 17 June – Thor Ørvig, sailor (b. 1891).
- 4 July – Hans Aasnæs, sport shooter (b. 1902).
- 10 July – Berge Sigval Natanael Bergesen, ship-owner (b. 1914).
- 11 July – Harald Johansen, footballer (b. 1887).
- 12 July – Sverre Reiten, politician (b. 1891).
- 13 July – Frithjof Lorentzen, fencer (b. 1896).
- 15 July – Einar Eriksen, rower (b. 1865).
- 17 July – Olliver Smith, modern pentathlete (b. 1898).
- 21 July – Robert Sjursen, gymnast (b. 1891).
- 21 July – Thor Martin Nilsen Sauvik, politician (b. 1889).
- 22 July – Kristoffer Skåne Grytnes, politician (b. 1887).
- 27 July – Gustav Natvig-Pedersen, politician (b. 1893).
- 30 July – Eivind Petershagen, politician (b. 1888).
- 6 August – Aksel Sandemose, novelist (b. 1899, died in Denmark).
- 8 August – Kristian Alfred Hammer, politician (b.1898)
- 11 August – Harald Halvorsen, gymnast (b. 1878).
- 16 August – Olav Hoprekstad, writer and language activist (b. 1875).
- 27 August – Karl Hansen, cyclist (b. 1902).
- 7 September – Oscar Fonbæk, athlete (b. 1887).
- 12 September – Elling Rønes, cross-country skier (b. 1882).
- 21 September – Thorstein Stryken, cyclist (b. 1900).
- 12 October – Alf Sommerfelt, linguist (b. 1892).
- 13 October – Andreas Honerød, politician (b.1905)
- 21 October – Karl Johan Pettersen Vadøy, politician (b.1878)
- 24 October – Trygve Thorsen, sculptor (b. 1892).
- 25 October – Sivert Aklestad, lyricist (b. 1889).
- 28 October – Egil Hylleraas, nuclear physicist (b. 1898).
- 13 November – Odd Borg, actor (b. 1931).
- 20 November – Per Jordbakke, yacht racer (b. 1932).
- 28 November – Aslaug Vaa, poet and playwright (b. 1889).
- 6 December – Wilhelm Rasmussen, sculptor (b. 1879).
- 9 December – Rasmus Andreas Torset, politician (b.1897)
- 10 December – Lars Christensen, ship-owner and whaling magnate (b. 1884).
- 12 December – Halvdan Koht, historian and politician (b. 1873).
- 16 December – Helen Upsaker, politician (b. 1896).
- 18 December – Aani Aanisson Rysstad, politician (b.1894)
- 18 December – Wilhelm Munthe, librarian (b. 1883).
- 20 December – Halvdan Wexelsen Freihow, theologian (b. 1883).
- 23 December – Carl Marstrander, linguist (b. 1883).

=== Full date unknown ===
- Gunnar Brøvig, politician (b.1924)
