= Kåre =

Kåre or Kaare is a given name. Notable people with the name include:

== People ==
=== Kåre ===
- Kåre And The Cavemen, Norwegian rock band formed 1990, disbanded 2000
- Kåre Berg (1932–2009), Norwegian MD, professor in medical genetics, physician-in-chief and researcher
- Kåre Bluitgen (born 1959), Danish writer and journalist
- Kåre Christiansen (1911–1964), Norwegian bobsledder
- Kåre Dæhlen (1926–2020), Norwegian diplomat
- Kåre Berven Fjeldsaa (1918–1991), Norwegian ceramic designer
- Kåre Fostervold (born 1969), Norwegian politician for the Progress Party
- Kåre Gjønnes (1942–2021), Norwegian politician for the Christian People's Party
- Kåre Grøndahl Hagem (1915–2008), Norwegian politician for the Conservative Party
- Kåre Øistein Hansen (1927–2012), Norwegian politician (SV)
- Kåre Harila (born 1935), Norwegian politician for the Christian Democratic Party
- Kåre Hedebrant (born 1995), Swedish child actor
- Kåre Holt (1916–1997), Norwegian author
- Kåre Hovda (1944–1999), Norwegian biathlete
- Kåre Ingebrigtsen (born 1965), former Norwegian footballer
- Kåre Jonsborg (1912–1977), Norwegian painter and textile artist
- Kåre Kivijärvi (1938–1991), Norwegian photographer
- Kåre Kristiansen (1920–2005), Norwegian politician for the Christian People's Party
- Kåre Lunden (1930–2013), Norwegian historian
- Kåre Martin Hansen (1913–1985), Norwegian politician for the Labour Party
- Kåre Nordstoga (born 1954), Norwegian organist
- Kåre Olafsen (1920–1945), Norwegian resistance member, executed during the Nazi occupation of Norway
- Kåre Olav-Berg (1944–2007), Norwegian Nordic skier
- Kåre Øvregard (1933–2025), Norwegian politician for the Labour Party
- Kåre Prytz (1926–1994), Norwegian journalist and novelist
- Kåre Rønnes (born 1938), Norwegian former football player and coach
- Kåre Rønning (1929–1990), Norwegian politician for the Centre Party
- Kåre Schultz (born 1961), Danish business executive
- Kåre Stokkeland (1918–1985), Norwegian politician for the Labour Party
- Kåre Valebrokk (1940–2013), Norwegian journalist
- Kåre Verpe (born 1949), Norwegian information worker and journalist
- Kåre Christoffer Vestrheim (born 1969), Norwegian record producer
- Kåre Willoch (1928–2021), Norwegian politician from the Conservative Party

=== Middle name ===
- Stein Kåre Kristiansen (born 1951), Norwegian journalist
- Walter Kåre Tjønndal (1923–2014), Norwegian politician for the Labour Party

=== Kaare ===
- Kaare Aksnes (born 1938), professor at the Institute for Theoretical Astrophysics at the University of Oslo
- Kaare Andrews, comic book writer and artist and filmmaker born in Canada
- Kaare Bache (1888–1978), Norwegian triple jumper
- Kaare Engstad (1906–1981), Canadian cross country skier
- Kaare Fostervoll (1891–1981), Norwegian politician for the Labour Party
- Kaare Frydenberg (born 1950), Norwegian businessperson
- Kaare Klint (1888–1954), Danish architect and furniture designer
- Kaare Kroppan (1933–2014), Norwegian actor
- Kaare Meland (1915–2002), Norwegian politician for the Conservative Party
- Kaare Norge (born 1963), Danish classical guitarist
- Kaare Sparby (1904–2001), Norwegian politician for the Conservative Party
- Kaare Steel Groos (1917–1994), Norwegian politician for the Conservative Party
- Kaare Strøm (limnologist) (1902–1967), Norwegian limnologist
- Kaare Strøm (athlete) (1915–1982), Norwegian triple and long jumper
- Kaare Strøm (political scientist) (born 1953), Norwegian political scientist
- Kaare Sundby (1905–1945), Norwegian engineer who was executed during the Nazi occupation of Norway
- Kaare Vedvik (born 1994), Norwegian-American football player
- Kaare Walberg (1912–1988), Norwegian ski jumper

== Other ==
- Kaare, Estonia, village in Lääne-Nigula Parish, Lääne County, Estonia
