= Lerum (surname) =

Lerum is a Norwegian surname. Notable people with the surname include:

- Arnie Lerum (1879–1911), American football player and coach
- Bjarne Lerum (1941–2010), Norwegian businessperson and politician
- Elin Lerum Boasson (born 1978), Norwegian environmentalist
- Kåre Lerum (born 1939), Norwegian businessperson and politician
- May Grethe Lerum (born 1965), Norwegian novelist
