= Frydenberg =

Frydenberg is a surname. Notable people with the surname include:

- Alf Frydenberg (1896–1989), Norwegian civil servant
- Josh Frydenberg (born 1971), Australian politician
- Kaare Frydenberg (born 1950), Norwegian businessperson

== See also ==
- Freudenberg (surname)
