= Denis Nash =

American epidemiologist

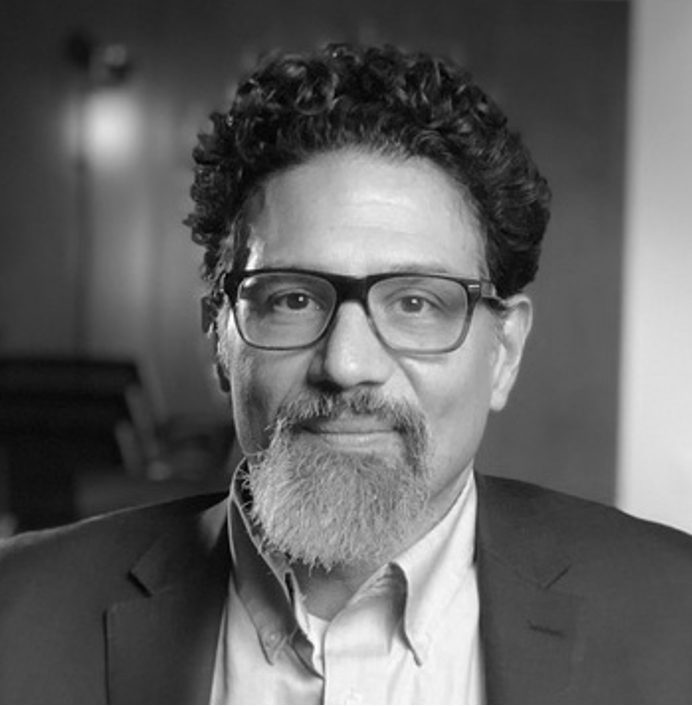
- Denis Nash in 2024

Academic background
- Education: University of Maryland School of Medicine; Johns Hopkins Bloomberg School of Public Health; Drexel University

Academic work
- Discipline: Epidemiology
- Institutions: CUNY Graduate School of Public Health and Health Policy

Denis Nash is distinguished professor of epidemiology at the CUNY Graduate School of Public Health and Health Policy in the City University of New York. Nash is the founding executive director of the CUNY Institute for Implementation Science in Population Health. He is also the associate director of the NIH-funded Einstein, Rockefeller, CUNY Center for AIDS Research (CFAR).

== Education ==
Denis Nash has a PhD in Epidemiology and Preventive Medicine (1999) from the University of Maryland School of Medicine and a Master of Public Health (1995) from the Johns Hopkins Bloomberg School of Public Health. He has a BS in physics (1991) from Drexel University. He was an Officer of the Center for Disease Control Epidemic Intelligence Service from 1999 to 2001.

== Career ==
Denis Nash is an expert in infectious disease epidemiology and public health surveillance for infectious diseases. He is on the editorial board of the Journal for the International AIDS Society.

In 1999, Nash played a key role in the outbreak investigation focused on the emergence of West Nile Virus in the western hemisphere. He also oversaw HIV/AIDS surveillance at the New York City Department of Health from 2001 to 2003, assisting with the implementation of named HIV case reporting and surveillance.

Since 2004, he has led and collaborated on large-scale research studies on HIV care and treatment scale-up in more than 20 sub-Saharan African countries, much of it in connection with the U.S. President's Emergency Plan for AIDS Relief (PEPFAR). He currently co-leads the Central African regional cohort collaboration of the global International Epidemiology Database to Evaluate AIDS (IeDEA).

Since 2009, he has served as the lead academic partner to the New York City Department of Health and Mental Hygiene as part of their efforts to evaluate the impact of the NYC Ryan White Care Coordination Program, which aims to support vulnerable people with HIV in their efforts to achieve optimal HIV treatment outcomes.

In March 2020, Nash led the design and launch of the CHASING COVID Cohort Study, a national cohort that seeks to characterize the impact of the COVID-19 pandemic on a range of health outcomes. Throughout the COVID pandemic, Nash contributed his expertise on infectious disease epidemiology and lessons from the HIV pandemic, including the extent of community spread of SARS-CoV-2 and variants, and COVID testing protocols.

Nash has held academic appointments in the Department of Epidemiology at Columbia University's Mailman School of Public Health, Mount Sinai School of Medicine, and at the Albert Einstein College of Medicine.

== Teaching ==
Nash teaches graduate courses on Infectious Disease Epidemiology and Public Health Surveillance.

== Selected publications ==
● Nash D, Mostashari F, Fine A, et al. The outbreak of West Nile virus infection in the New York City area in 1999. N Engl J Med 2001;344(24):1807–14.

● Robertson MM, Waldron L, Robbins RS, et al. Using Registry Data to Construct a Comparison Group for Programmatic Effectiveness Evaluation - the New York City HIV Care Coordination Program. Am J Epidemiol 2018;187(9):1980–9.

● Tymejczyk O, Brazier E, Yiannoutsos CT, et al. Changes in rapid HIV treatment initiation after national "treat all" policy adoption in 6 sub-Saharan African countries: Regression discontinuity analysis. PLoS Med 2019;16(6):e1002822.

● Brazier E, Tymejczyk O, Wools-Kaloustian K, et al. Long-term HIV care outcomes under universal HIV treatment guidelines: A retrospective cohort study in 25 countries. PLoS Med 2024;21(3):e1004367.

● Nash D, Srivastava A, Shen Y, et al. Seroincidence of SARS-CoV-2 infection prior to and during the rollout of vaccines in a community-based prospective cohort of U.S. adults. Sci Rep 2024;14(1):644.
