= Nina Lykke =

Nina Lykke may refer to:

- Nina Lykke (gender studies scholar), Danish–Swedish gender studies scholar
- Nina Lykke (writer), Norwegian writer
