= Ayman El-Mohandes =

Ayman El-Mohandes FAAP
- El-Mohandes in 2014
- Born: Guiza, Egypt
- Citizenship: United States
- Title: Dean, City University of New York Graduate School of Public Health and Health Policy
- Spouse: Hala El-Mohandes

Ayman El-Mohandes is an Egyptian-American epidemiologist who is dean of the CUNY Graduate School of Public Health and Health Policy since 2013. He was the dean of the College of Public Health at the University of Nebraska Medical Center from 2009 to 2013. He is a pediatrician and specialist in neonatal medicine and infant mortality in minority populations. El-Mohandes is an expert on vaccine hesitancy and acceptance.

== Education ==
Ayman El-Mohandes received his Doctor of Medicine from Cairo University Medical School. He received his Master of Public Health in epidemiology and biostatistics from George Washington University.

== Career ==
Prior to joining the City University of New York, El-Mohandes was a founding faculty member of the George Washington University (GWU) School of Public Health and Health Services, now known as the Milken Institute School of Public Health, where he served as associate dean for research and later, chair of the Department of Prevention and Community Health. He completed his training in pediatrics and neonatal medicine at DC Children's National Hospital, and was board certified in pediatric and neonatal medicine in 1985. He was an attending neonatologist and professor of pediatrics at George Washington. El-Mohandes went on to serve as the inaugural dean of the University of Nebraska Medical Center College of Public Health. His primary research addressed maternal and child health, particularly in underserved communities.

From 1999-2003, El-Mohandes served as principal investigator of the National Institute of Child Health and Human Development (NICHD) Initiative to Reduce Infant Mortality in Minority Populations. He is a Fellow of the American Academy of Pediatrics (FAAP), an elected Member of the American Society of Pediatrics (MASP), and a board member of the CUNY Research Foundation.

Since 2020, El-Mohandes has focused his research interest on the population health impact of the COVID-19 epidemic and vaccine hesitancy worldwide. His work in this domain has appeared in Nature, The Lancet, and the American Journal of Public Health. El-Mohandes is regularly consulted on this subject in the media. He is the co-lead of the New York City Pandemic Response Institute.

During 2022-2023, El-Mohandes was the chair of the Board of Directors for the Association of Schools and Programs in Public Health (ASPPH).

El-Mohandes is co-chair of the governing board at the Pandemic Response Institute along with co-chair Wafaa El-Sadr, founder and director of ICAP at Columbia University. El-Mohandes regularly appeared on media outlets for his expertise on COVID resurgence during the COVID pandemic and vaccine hesitancy.

In January 2024, El-Mohandes gave testimony before the Health, Finance, and Ways and Means Committees of the New York State Assembly on the executive budget proposal for health and Medicaid.

In 2022, El-Mohandes co-authored a seminal article in Nature that brought together 386 experts from academia, governments, and NGOs. Experts represented 112 countries. Using the Delphi method, the study proposed 57 recommendations for ending the COVID pandemic and addressed inadequacies of the global response to the pandemic.

In 2021, El-Mohandes moderated a discussion on corporate impact on human and planetary health C-SPAN2's Book TV. The program featured book author and CUNY Graduate School of Public Health and Health Policy distinguished professor Nicholas Freudenberg, food policy expert and professor emerita Marion Nestle and former New York City Health Commissioner Mary T. Bassett.

== Awards and honors ==
El-Mohandes was featured in New York City & State's "2026 50 over 50," recognized for his global public health research and for the rapid success of CUNY SPH under his leadership. In 2024 he was recognized as a "highly cited researcher" by Clarivate, indicating that his publications rank in the top 1% by citations for their field(s) and publication year in the Web of Science™ over the past decade. El-Mohandes was the recipient of the Milken Institute School of Public Health 950 Award in 2022. He was the recipient of the APHA Executive Director Citation in 2017 for “extraordinary leadership and innovation in strengthening the Association’s membership and development efforts."
