= Freudenberg =

Freudenberg can refer to:

== Companies ==
- Freudenberg Group, a German family-owned diversified group of companies

== Places ==
=== France ===
- Freudenberg, Moselle, a village in the French département of Moselle

=== Germany ===
- Schloss Freudenberg, a palace in Wiesbaden-Dotzheim
- Beiersdorf-Freudenberg
- Freudenberg, Bavaria, in the Amberg-Sulzbach district, Bavaria
- Freudenberg, Westphalia, in the Siegen-Wittgenstein district, North Rhine-Westphalia
- Freudenberg (Baden), in the Main-Tauber district, Baden-Württemberg

=== Switzerland ===
- Freudenberg Castle

== People ==
- Freudenberg (surname)

== See also ==
- Hubertus, Prince of Löwenstein-Wertheim-Freudenberg (1906–1984), German historian and an early opponent of Adolf Hitler
