= Bjarne Lerum =

Norwegian businessman and politician (1941–2010)

Bjarne Magnar Lerum (1941 – 12 October 2010) was a Norwegian businessperson and politician for the Progress Party.

He was a son of Karl Lerum, and brother of Kåre Lerum and Gerd Kjellaug Berge. Together with Kåre Lerum he was the owner of the family company Lerum in Sogndal Municipality. After the brothers passed the company on to their children in 2005, he was a board member and technical director of the company. He is credited with improving the technical production and packaging of the company's products. He was also a member of the municipal council of Sogndal Municipality for the Progress Party.

He was married and had three children. He died in October 2010. He was one of the wealthiest people in Sogndal before he died.
