= Freudenberg (surname) =

Freudenberg is a surname. Notable people with the surname include:

- Graham Freudenberg (1934-2019), author and speechwriter for the Australian Labor Party;
- Karl Freudenberg (1886–1983), German chemist;
- Nicholas Freudenberg, professor of public health;
- Richard Freudenberg (basketball) (born 1998), German basketball player;
- Richard Freudenberg (1892-1975), German politician
- Winfried Freudenberg (1956-1989), the last person to be killed trying to escape from East Germany.

== See also ==
- Freudenberger
