= Christian Tybring-Gjedde =

Norwegian MP (born 1963)

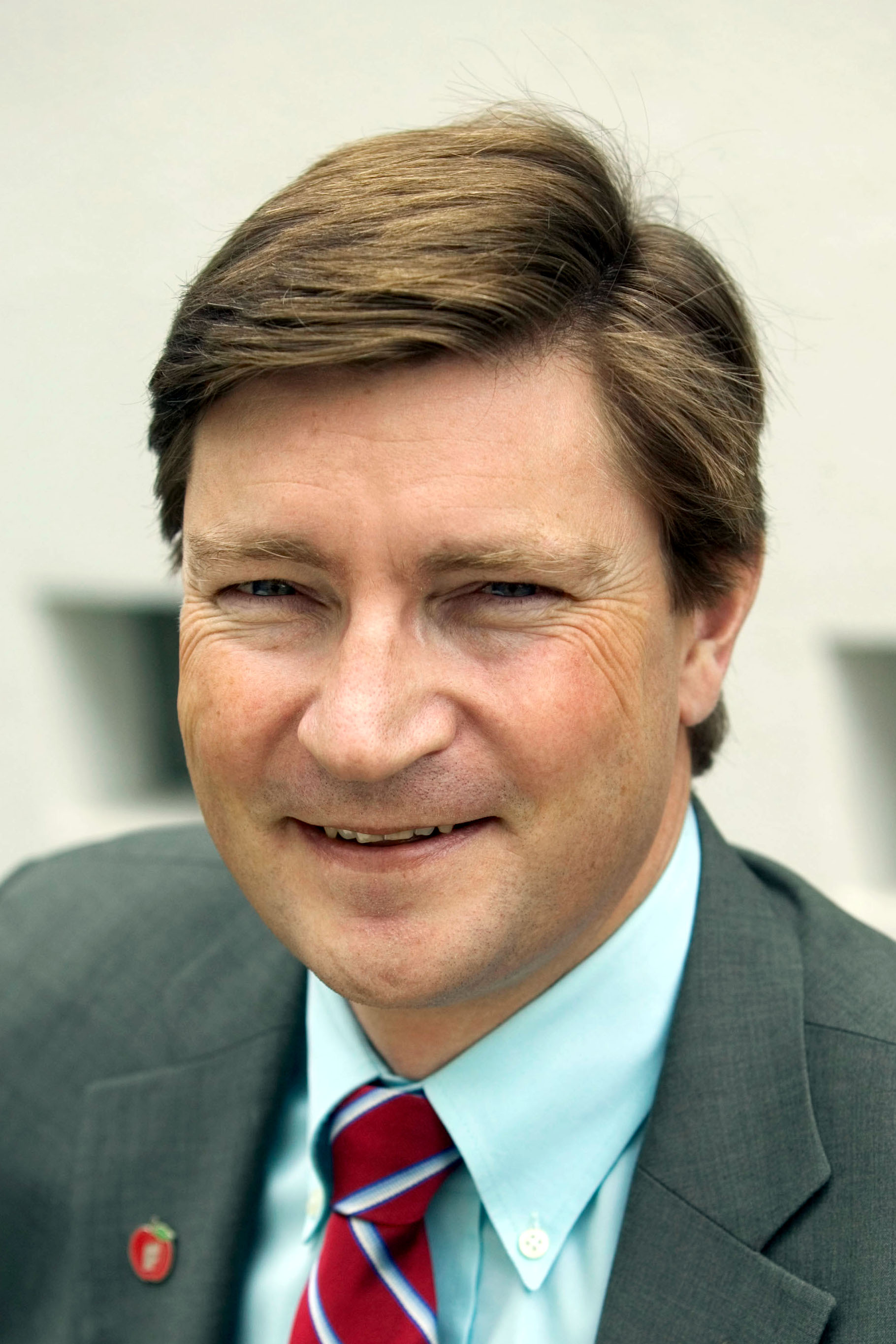
- Tybring-Gjedde in 2005

Member of the Storting
- In office 1 October 2005 – 30 September 2025
- Constituency: Oslo

Personal details
- Born: 8 August 1963 (age 63) Oslo, Norway
- Party: Progress (1979–2024); Independent (since 2024)
- Spouse: Ingvil Smines Tybring-Gjedde
- Children: 4, including Mathilde Tybring-Gjedde
- Education: Loyola University Chicago; University of Denver; NATO Defense College

Christian Tybring-Gjedde (born 8 August 1963) is a Norwegian politician who represented the Progress Party until 2024. He has been a member of the Norwegian parliament since 2005, and was the leader of the Progress Party's Oslo chapter from 2010 to 2014.

He is most widely known for his opposition to immigration, especially Muslim immigration. He believes immigration policy to be the single most important political issue facing Norwegian society. In 2014 he released his book about immigration politics titled Mens orkesteret fortsetter å spille (While the orchestra continues to play). In 2018 and 2020 he put forward U.S. President Donald Trump as a candidate for the Nobel Peace Prize; any member of parliament may propose candidates.

He has been described by some media commentators and scholars as far-right, (Note: Sources describing Tybring-Gjedde as far-right:) anti-immigrant and Islamophobic, (Note: Sources describing Tybring-Gjedde as Islamophobic:) and is a leading figure in a party faction that seeks to declare Norway a "patriotic beacon". Previously, his pro-Russian views were criticised by Norwegian conservatives, but since the 2022 Russian invasion of Ukraine he has sided with Ukraine and NATO against "Russian imperialism" and Russia's "brutal and unprovoced attack". The Local describes him as "one of Norway's most controversial anti-immigration politicians" and political scientist Sindre Bangstad has described him as one of the "main traffickers in extreme right-wing rhetorical tropes about Islam and Muslims" in Norway. Tybring-Gjedde was a civil servant in the Ministry of Defence before he entered politics.

In July 2024, Tybring-Gjedde was expelled from the Progress Party for comments made regarding its nomination process in Oslo.

== Early life, education and work ==
Christian Tybring-Gjedde was born in Oslo to businessman Harald Tybring-Gjedde (born 1930) and Irene Mathilde Falch (born 1930). His father was the owner of an office supply company founded by Christian's grandfather Carl in 1918, until selling the family business in 2001. He was raised in Sandvika in the Bærum municipality near Oslo's west-end, attending primary school at Jong Elementary school from 1970 to 1976, and upper secondary school at Kristelig Gymnasium from 1976 to 1982.

An active water polo player (playing as goalkeeper), he was granted an athletic scholarship to study in the United States in 1984. He studied at the Loyola University Chicago from 1984 to 1988, and achieved a bachelor's degree in political science. From 1988 to 1990 he studied at the University of Denver, Colorado, achieving a master's degree in international studies. He later attended the NATO Defense College in Rome from 1996 to 1997. He won the Norwegian championship with the Frogner water polo club in 1992, and has been picked out for the national water polo team.

Between 1993 and 2005 he was employed in the Norwegian Ministry of Defence, from 2002 as Assistant Director-General, including three years with the Norwegian delegation to NATO in Brussels. As a senior civil servant, he had to quit his job to stand as a candidate for the 2005 parliamentary election, while only willing to do so if nominated for his party's third spot in Oslo.

== Political career ==
Tybring-Gjedde has been a member of the Progress Party since 1979, when he was attending secondary school. He was elected to his first public office in the 2003 local elections for the Oslo city council, while having been deputy chairman of the party's Oslo chapter from 2001 until then. He held the local office until 2005 when he was elected to parliament, having secured the party nomination after Geir Mo dropped out from the contest for the third place on its Oslo list (the top two spots taken by Siv Jensen and Carl I. Hagen). He was re-elected to parliament in 2009 and in 2013 on a more secure second spot only behind party leader Jensen. For his first two terms he served as a member of the Standing Committee on Finance and Economic Affairs, and since 2013 he has been a member of the Standing Committee on Foreign Affairs and Defence.

Tybring-Gjedde was the leader of the Progress Party's Oslo chapter from 2010, until announcing his withdrawal in 2014. Following the Progress Party's government entrance in 2013, Tybring-Gjedde has been outspoken in his belief that the party has compromised too much on the immigration issue. As the only Progress Party member of parliament, he voted against the government's finalised immigration agreement with the Liberal and Christian Democratic parties, and later wrote a letter to the Progress Party leadership requesting to be allowed to vote according to his own persuasion on immigration-issues in parliament; dissatisfied with the response, he claimed he would "give up" immigration politics. He did not attend the party's 2014 national convention, considering he had "no tasks" there, and announced he would publish a book later that year. The conflict has prompted media speculation that he may be on his way to leaving the party, although he has rejected this himself.

In 2015 he was assigned second deputy chair of the Standing Committee on Foreign Affairs and Defence. He was re-elected to parliament in 2017 and 2021.

In April 2024, he announced that he would not be seeking re-election to parliament in the 2025 parliamentary election. When the Oslo chapter of the Progress Party presented their proposal for the 2025 parliamentary list candidates in June, Tybring-Gjedde stated to TV2 that "The proposal from the nomination committee is a commission and party political corruption." This was after the moderate candidate Tor Mikkel Wara and the liberal candidate Simen Velle were proposed to be nominated for the first and second place on the Oslo chapter of the Progress Party parliamentary list. In July, Tybring-Gjedde was expelled from the Progress Party for comments made regarding the nomination process.

== Immigration debate ==
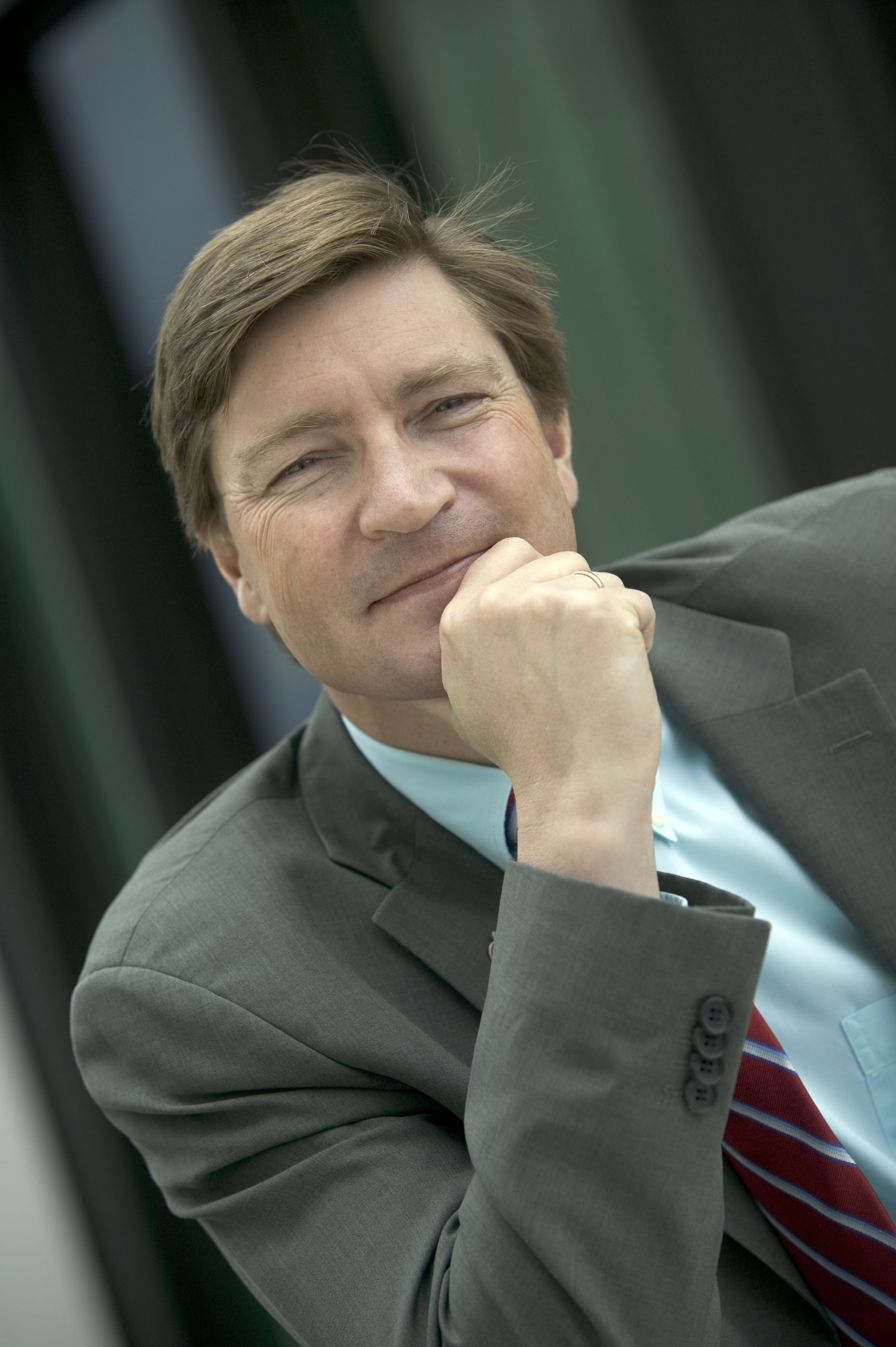
Tybring-Gjedde in 2005

Since his second parliamentary term, Tybring-Gjedde has become known for his outspoken criticism of Norwegian immigration policy. In 2020 he spearheaded an attempt within his party to declare Norway a "patriotic beacon"; summarising the core content of this policy, he said his party should call for "a complete ban on non-western immigration" and a referendum on immigration, arguing that "we have no duty to abolish our own people". Political scientist Sindre Bangstad has described him as one of the "main traffickers in extreme right-wing rhetorical tropes about Islam and Muslims" in Norway.

Demanding immigrants to adjust to Norwegian society, he has previously said that immigration to Norway should be "dramatically reduced", proposing at the time to only give temporary residence permits to asylum seekers, and to withdraw residence permits for asylum seekers "going on vacation" back to countries they have reported to have fled from. Critical of Islamic influence and lack of "freedom values", he has compared the hijab to Ku Klux Klan and Nazi outfits, considering it an "Islamic uniform", and said that Norway should take a "tough stand" against Islamisation "happening before our eyes". As member of the Norwegian parliament, in 2006 he nominated Islam-critical filmmaker Ayaan Hirsi Ali for the Nobel Peace Prize.

He gained widespread publicity and controversy in August 2010 when he co-authored an op-ed in Aftenposten titled "Dream from Disneyland", where he strongly criticized what he described as the Labour Party-led immigration policy. The feature said that the immigration was threatening to "tear Norway apart", and that the Labour Party had stabbed the Norwegian culture in the back. He subsequently claimed to represent the majority of Norwegians on the issue, claiming to be "mainstream in Norway" and "saying what you hear at parties". Met with accusations of holding "racist views", he has described such accusations as "frustrating and as far from the truth as possible".

In his speech at the 2011 Progress Party national convention in May he devoted much time to attacking the conditions he described that ethnic Norwegians were living under in the multicultural suburb of Grorud Valley in Oslo. The Labour Party's Jonas Gahr Støre denounced the speech as "bordering on the hateful". The Labour Party's youth organisation AUF filed charges of racism against Tybring-Gjedde for the speech and for subsequent statements to the media claiming that immigrant boys are more hot-headed than Norwegian boys, but the police eventually dropped the charges as "no criminal offense".

He sparked a wide public debate about Norwegian culture in 2012/13 after asking Culture Minister Hadia Tajik and Integration Minister Inga Marte Thorkildsen to define Norwegian culture, and if they believed it to be important to protect. Their responses led him to accuse them of "denying Norwegian culture".

In 2014 he released his book discussing immigration politics titled Mens orkesteret fortsetter å spille ("While the orchestra continues playing"; alluding to events in the sinking of the Titanic). In the book, he described how he believed Norway would face economic and cultural ruin in just a few years time due to too high immigration, poor integration and high welfare costs. In order to control Norway's borders more tightly, he called for reconsidering Norway's ratification of the United Nations Refugee Convention by Article 44, believing its establishment in 1951 to have been designed for an entirely different time than the modern migrant situation. He also suggested to dissolve the modern asylum system, and transport all incoming asylum seekers to an international centre to have their applications processed.

== Climate change ==
Tybring-Gjedde has on several occasions rejected the scientific consensus on climate change. In 2016, Tybring-Gjedde and six other Progress Party parliamentarians proposed that their party adopted the position that "the Progress Party believes that climate change is a result of natural variations and rejects the claim that climate change is a result of humans' low level of emissions of greenhouse gases." In 2020 Tybring-Gjedde said that his party should focus more on the view that "climate change is not man-made". He also said his party should support Folkeopprøret mot klimahysteriet, a Facebook-based self-described "revolt against the climate hysteria."

== Foreign politics ==
Tybring-Gjedde has stated that he is opposed to Norwegian membership of the European Union. He has proposed for Norway to challenge the European Economic Area and the Schengen Agreement, and potentially consider other forms of cooperation.

A member of the pro-Israel parliamentary caucus Friends of Israel in the Parliament of Norway, Tybring-Gjedde has made appearances in pro-Israel demonstrations, and has criticised Foreign Minister Børge Brende for being "unbalanced" and "naive" in his approach to the conflict in Gaza. He has called for rejecting any pressure to follow Sweden's move in 2014 of recognising State of Palestine prior to an agreement has been reached between the two parties in the conflict. When Mads Gilbert was denied entry to Gaza through Israel the same year, Tybring-Gjedde voiced his understanding of Israel's decision, stating that the country had the full right to deny Gilbert entrance. His fierce defence of Israel and rhetoric on Islam has led him to be compared to Dutch politician Geert Wilders by the Norwegian Centre Against Racism. In September 2020, he praised the Trump-brokered Israel–United Arab Emirates normalization agreement, which will lead to normalization of relations between the two countries and suspend the proposed Israeli annexation of the West Bank.

In other issues Tybring-Gjedde has voiced opinions contradicting his party's official policy. He condemned human rights violations in Saudi Arabia and criticized the close relations between the Saudi regime and Western governments. He criticized human rights abuses and anti-EU policies by Erdogan's Turkey, Norway's ally in NATO. He has been sharply critical of the foreign policy of the United States prior to the election of Donald Trump. In response to the annexation of Crimea by the Russian Federation and the war in Donbas, Tybring-Gjedde previously criticised Western countries for too strongly condemning Russia's actions, and has called for the use of more caution towards Russia as well as to help Vladimir Putin "to save face". He said the Minsk Protocol adopted by the leaders of Germany, France, Ukraine and Russia, which ensures peace and stabilization in eastern Ukraine, must be implemented. Tybring-Gjedde criticized the sanctions against Russia that the conservatives pushed for; he has also said the west should recognise the annexation of Crimea by the Russian Federation. He said that in relations with China, the government should put Norway's interests first.

He has also voiced his scepticism of sending about 100 Norwegian soldiers to Iraq to fight against ISIL, fearing that doing so would increase the risk of Islamic terrorism in Norway, as well as not leading to peace and democracy in the region. Previously however he had called for Norway to join the United States' coalition against ISIL. He has proposed for Norwegian citizens joining ISIL to be put on trial for treason on the same line as Norwegians having fought for Nazi Germany during the Second World War.

In February 2022, Tybring-Gjedde stated that Ukrainian president Volodymyr Zelenskyy should be nominated for the Nobel Peace Prize, citing his fight for peace and having become an inspiration for the Ukrainian people. However, the nomination deadline for the prize expired on 31 January. Despite this, Tybring-Gjedde called on a Zelenskyy nomination to be an exception given the country’s circumstances.

=== Nomination of Donald Trump for the Nobel Peace Prize ===
In 2018 and 2020, Tybring-Gjedde said he had put forward Donald Trump's name as a candidate for the Nobel Peace Prize. In 2020, he nominated Trump for his role in brokering a normalization agreement between Israel and the United Arab Emirates, called the Abraham Accords, because "As it is expected other Middle Eastern countries will follow in the footsteps of the UAE, this agreement could be a game changer that will turn the Middle East into a region of cooperation and prosperity." Tybring-Gjedde wrote: "I'm not a big Trump supporter. The committee should look at the facts and judge him on the facts – not on the way he behaves sometimes." Any member of parliament worldwide, any professor or associate professor in relevant fields such as the humanities or social sciences, and a number of other individuals, may propose candidates. Nominations are kept secret and not officially confirmed for 50 years; each year several hundred nominations are submitted.

== Political ideology ==
Tybring-Gjedde is regarded as being on the far right wing of the Progress Party, and has been described as extreme right by expert on the far right Sindre Bangstad. Since 2019 Tybring-Gjedde has been a leading figure in a party faction that seeks to replace the party's ideology with a "Norway first" ideology with an emphasis on anti-immigration and rejection of the scientific consensus on climate change, and in 2020 he spearheaded an attempt to declare Norway a "patriotic beacon". He said that the party should move in a national conservative direction and that "very few people agree" with the stated ideology of liberalism in the party programme because "liberalism in its extreme form means open borders" and because he views liberalism as a dead ideology. Tybring-Gjedde has called for his party to cooperate more with the Sweden Democrats and to invite Jimmie Åkesson to his party's national convention. In 2017 he endorsed Marine Le Pen of the French National Front for president.

== Personal life ==
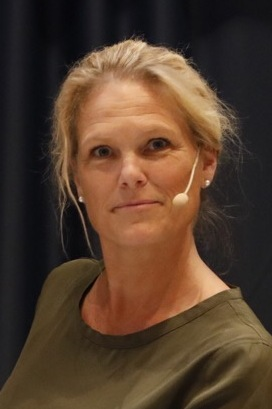
Tybring-Gjedde's wife Ingvil Smines Tybring-Gjedde, who was the Minister of Public Security in 2019–20

Tybring-Gjedde is currently married to his second wife Ingvil Smines Tybring-Gjedde, who was also his childhood sweetheart from their time at Kristelig Gymnasium. They re-acquainted after his election to parliament in 2005 and got married in Rome in 2009. They have four children combined with previous marriages. A fellow member of the Progress Party and former senior advisor for Innovation Norway and the Ministry of Foreign Affairs, she was appointed state secretary in the Ministry of Petroleum and Energy in 2015, and Minister of Public Security in 2019. Tybring-Gjedde said he was proud of his wife, who refused to go to Iran in 2017, where she would have to wear the compulsory hijab. Prior to his first marriage to Randi Myklebust, Tybring-Gjedde had a Pakistani roommate for almost two years during his time as a student in Denver. His daughter from his first marriage Mathilde Tybring-Gjedde is also a member of the Norwegian parliament, but for the Conservative Party. He is a member of the Church of Norway.

He is currently estranged from his parents after a dispute over his divorce from his first wife. He is reported to have forfeited millions of NOK from the family business due to this. According to him, he is financially cut off from his original inheritance, although his father refuted this in 2013. He has said that he has not met or spoken to his father for several years, and that he is open about his family having "many issues".

In December 2011 it was reported that Tybring-Gjedde had gone on sick leave due to threats. He has later publicly related about becoming sick due to heated hostility towards him in the media, harassment and death threats, requiring police protection at times, as part of a backlash following the 2011 Norway attacks. His wife has spoken out against him being scapegoated and singled out by the media for his views. Diagnosed with stress syndrome, he has experienced epileptic seizures and episodes of amnesia.

Tyvring-Gjedde and his wife were among the people threatened in connection with the play Ways of seeing in 2019. Laila Bertheussen was later sentenced for sending the threats.

== Bibliography ==
- Tybring-Gjedde, Christian (2014). Mens orkesteret fortsetter å spille. Cappelen Damm. ISBN 9788202453831.
