= Kåre Lerum =

Norwegian businessman and politician

Kåre Norvald Lerum (born 4 December 1939) is a Norwegian businessperson and politician.

He was born in Vik Municipality and took an education in Stavanger. He was hired as manager in 1976, and was later the chief executive officer, in Lerum in Sogndal Municipality, a family company he owned together with his brother Bjarne Lerum. He is also a brother of Gerd Kjellaug Berge. Lerum was succeeded as chief executive officer by Jan Petter Vadheim in 2004. The brothers passed the ownership of the company down to their children in 2005. As of 2010, Lerum remained a member of the board of directors of Lerum. Lerum is still one of the wealthiest people in Sogndal.

Lerum chaired the employers' organisation Konservesfabrikkenes Landsforening. He was a member of the municipal council of Sogndal Municipality for six years and served as mayor from 1978 to 1982. He initially represented the Conservative Party but later joined the Progress Party in 2002.

Lerum was decorated as a Knight, First Class, of the Royal Norwegian Order of St. Olav in 2005. In 2003, he won a prize from the regional branch of Noregs Mållag.
