= Gerd Kjellaug Berge =

Norwegian hotelier (born 1943)

Gerd Kjellaug Berge, née Lerum (born 20 March 1943) is a Norwegian hotelier and national business council leader.

She was born in Sogndal Municipality, as a sister of Kåre Lerum and Bjarne Lerum. She became director of a hotel in Selje in 1976, and co-owner with her husband Harald in 1983. She was president of the employers' association Norsk Hotell- og Restaurantforbund (a forerunner of the Norwegian Hospitality Association) from 1988 to 1990 and vice president of the Confederation of Norwegian Enterprise from 2000 to 2004.

Berge was chosen Årets nynorskbrukar (Nynorsk User of the Year) in 2001, and holds The King's Medal of Merit in silver.
