= Terry Huang =

Prevention scientist

Terry Huang is American-Canadian-Taiwanese prevention scientist, distinguished professor at the CUNY Graduate School of Public Health and Health Policy and he previously served as chair of the Department of Health Policy and Management. He was previously chair of the Department of Health Promotion at the College of Public Health at the University of Nebraska Medical Center in Omaha, Nebraska. He is a leading expert on childhood obesity, systems approaches to community health, and chronic disease prevention.

== Education ==
Terry Huang received his PhD in Preventive Medicine and MPH from University of Southern California in Los Angeles, California. He received his BA in Psychology from McGill University in Montreal, Canada. Huang holds an MBA from the IE Business School in Madrid, Spain.

== Career ==
Terry Huang is a specialist in the area of childhood obesity, chronic disease prevention, and systems science in public health.

Huang is co-founder and senior advisor for the National Collaborative on Childhood Obesity Research (NCCOR) which coordinates activities the National Institutes of Health, Centers for Disease Control and Prevention, United States Department of Agriculture, and the Robert Wood Johnson Foundation. He was Vice President North America for the World Obesity Foundation. He is director of Center for Systems and Community Design.

In 2009, Terry Huang testified before the US House Committee on Energy and Commerce: Subcommittee on Health on the subject of Innovations in Addressing Childhood Obesity.

In 2010, Terry Huang was the recipient of the U.S. Department of Health and Human Services Secretary's Innovation Award.

Terry Huang is chief specialty editor for public health and nutrition for Frontiers in Public Health.

As of 2024, Terry Huang is a Fellow at the New York Academy of Medicine.
