= Ellen Alfsen =

Norwegian politician (born 1965)

Ellen Alfsen (born 31 May 1965) is a Norwegian politician for the Christian Democratic Party.

She served as a deputy representative to the Norwegian Parliament from Østfold during the terms 2001–2005 and 2005–2009.

She hails from Moss.
