= Lerum (company) =

Norwegian food and drinks company

- Founded: 1907
- Founder: Nils Hansson Lerum; Kari Hansdotter Ørbech; husband and wife
- Headquarters: Sogndal Municipality, Norway
- Key people: Trine Lerum Hjellhaug (CEO); Bernt Bergheim (CFO)
- Website: lerum.no

Lerum is a Norwegian company, which produces food and drinks. As of 2006, the company was considered to be Norway's top manufacturer of fruit drinks, and manufactured many supermarket store brands.

== History ==
It was founded in 1907 by Nils Hansson Lerum and his wife Kari Hansdotter Ørbech as a small store in Sørheim in Luster Municipality. Since many in the rural community paid with raspberries, they started production of juice in a small factory in 1909. By 1918, the factory was producing tens of thousands of liters of juice and kilograms of jam. In 1919, production was moved to Sogndal Municipality. Coincident with this move, a company was formed as A/S NH Lerums Saftfabrikk. Lerum, which still is family-owned, now consists of two subdivisions, Lerum Konserves and Lerum Fabrikker.

Lerum had an arrangement which ended in 1998 to produce Pepsi products, thereafter opting to produce their own products.

In 2006, Lerum joined other drink manufacturers who were adding sugar-free alternatives, in their case opting for sucralose as a sugar alternative.

As of 2009, the company's products were sold almost exclusively in Norway.

== Management ==
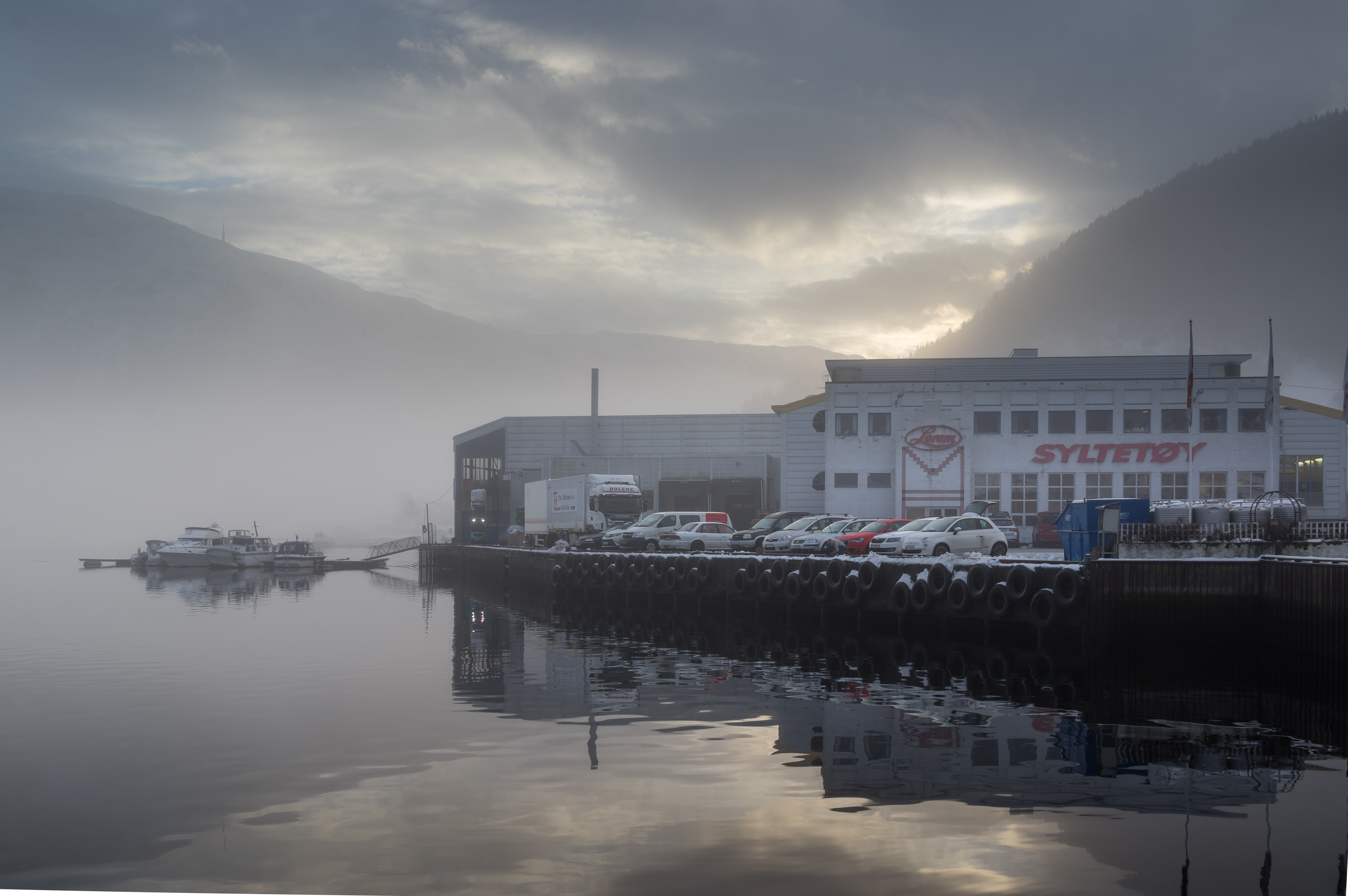
Lerum jam factory in Sogndal.

As of 2010, the chief executive officer (CEO) (Administrative Director) was Trine Lerum Hjellhaug (who was also the founders' great-granddaughter), the Deputy Director was Jan Petter Vadheim, and the chief financial officer was Bernt Bergheim. Also, as of 2010 the chairman of the board was Sverre S. Tysland, while board members included Kristine Aasheim, Jon Terje Øverland, Jørn Stenehjem, and Erik Asbjørn Thue; several members of the Lerum family were also board members: Kurt Lerum, Gro Lerum Bondevik, Bente Lerum Lund, Kåre Lerum, Grethe Kristin Lerum.

Prior to Hjellhaug's tenure as CEO, the position was held by Kåre Lerum until 2004 (board member as of 2010), then held by Jan Petter Vadheim (Deputy Director as of 2010).
