= Nicholas Freudenberg =

American public health practitioner

Nicholas Freudenberg (born in 1948) is distinguished professor of public health at the City University of New York School of Public Health and at Hunter College.

He is founder and director of Corporations and Health Watch (www.corporationsandhealth.org), an international network monitoring the business practices of the alcohol, automobile, firearms, food and beverage, pharmaceutical and tobacco industries.

== Publications ==
- Nicholas Freudenberg (2021). At What Cost: Modern Capitalism and the Future of Health. Oxford University Press. ISBN 9780197678923.
- Nicholas Freudenberg (2014). Lethal But Legal: Corporations, Consumption, and Protecting Public Health. Oxford University Press. ISBN 9780190495374.
- Nicholas Freudenberg (1984). Not in Our Backyard: Community Action for Health and the Environment. Monthly Review Press. ISBN 9780853456544.
