= Frode Granhus =

Norwegian author (1965–2017)

Frode Granhus (13 March 1965 – 15 September 2017) was a Norwegian author, best known for his series about investigator Rino Carlsen.

== Biography ==
He debuted in 2003 with Hevneren, which went largely unnoticed. His breakthrough came in 2010 with Malstrømmen (The Maelstrom), the first book about police investigator Rino Carlsen, set in Lofoten where Granhus himself lived his entire life. Granhus later commented on his choice of location, saying he wanted to show audiences that "things can happen outside Oslo or Bergen", referring to the large number of crime novels set in those cities. The second book in the series was published in 2012, followed by three more in 2014, 2015 and 2017. While the series was successful and released to very good reviews, Granhus nonetheless continued his full-time job as a counselor while writing in his spare time.

=== Death ===
Granhus died suddenly in his home in Lofoten on 15 September 2017, aged 52. He was survived by his long-time partner and their daughter.
