= Thomas Gill (footballer) =

Norwegian footballer (born 1965)

Personal information
- Date of birth: 16 May 1965 (age 61)
- Place of birth: Grimstad, Norway
- Height: 1.88 m (6 ft 2 in)
- Position: Goalkeeper

Senior career*
Years	Team	Apps	(Gls)
1983–1986	FK Jerv		
1987–1988	Vålerenga IF		
1989	IK Start		
1990	SK Brann	20	(0)
1991	Vålerenga IF	0	(0)
1992	FK Jerv	0	(0)
1993	Vejle Boldklub		
1993–1995	Aalborg BK	81	(0)
1996	Sturm Graz	18	(0)
1996–1998	MSV Duisburg	71	(0)
1999	F.C. Copenhagen	5	(0)
1999–2000	Ayr United	8	(0)
2000	Fredrikstad FK	8	(0)
2001	IK Start	8	(0)
2002	IK Grane Arendal		
2002–2003	Frederikshavn fI		
2003–2004	FC Hjørring		
2004	Flekkerøy IL		
2005	Strømsgodset IF		

International career
1997–98	Norway	5	(0)
- * Club domestic league appearances and goals

Thomas Gill (born 16 May 1965) is a Norwegian former professional footballer who played as a goalkeeper. Gill got five caps for Norway.
