= Wenche Olsen =

Norwegian politician

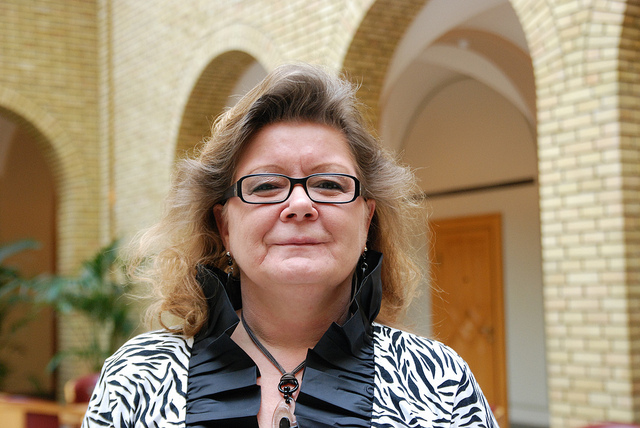
Wenche Olsen

Wenche Olsen (born 30 November 1965, in Halden) is a Norwegian politician and member of the Storting who represents the Norwegian Labour Party. Olsen was nominated as the Labour Party's fourth candidate for Østfold at the 2009 Norwegian parliamentary election, and won a seat after a strong performance in that county. Her issues in the campaign were on healthcare, in particular she supported the construction of a new hospital in Halden.

Prior to her election into national level politics, Olsen was elected to the municipality council in Halden between 1999 and 2003, she had already been a deputy member from 1995. From 2007 until 2009, she was deputy mayor of Halden. She has also been the leader of the Halden division of the LO trade union confederation.

Apart from politics, Olsen started her career as a cleaner at Halden sykehus in 1982, and she has since advanced to head of the cleaning and textile department at Sykehuset Østfold from 1999. She held that position until her election to parliament and is now on leave from that job.
