= Hallgeir Finbråten =

Norwegian footballer (born 1965)

Personal information
- Date of birth: 1 November 1965 (age 60)
- Position: Defender

Youth career
- 1972–: Eidsvold Turn

Senior career*
Years	Team	Apps	(Gls)
–1984	Eidsvold Turn		
1985−1990	HamKam		
1991−1993	Lyn	61	(4)
1995	Eidsvold Turn		

International career
1987	Norway under-21	1	(0)

Managerial career
- 2019–2021: Voss (assistant)
- * Club domestic league appearances and goals

Hallgeir Finbråten (born 1 November 1965) is a retired Norwegian football defender. He played two seasons in the highest Norwegian league for Hamkam, followed by three seasons on the second tier before he had three Eliteserien seasons in Lyn.

== Career ==
Finbråten started playing organized football in Eidsvold TF at the age of 7. Together with forward Tom Fodstad he progressed through the youth teams to the senior team. In late 1982 they were both selected for a training camp in West Germany with Norway U17.

Both Finbråten and Fodstad joined HamKam ahead of the 1985 season. Finbråten established himself in Hamkam's team during 1985, being repurposed from a central midfielder to back. Outside of football, he studied business at BI Gjøvik. Finbråten was later capped for Norway's under-21 side. He played as a left back against Poland U21 in 1987, being lauded for a safe playing style and keeping the ball within the team.

In 1988 he played every league match for Hamkam, being one of three to do so (Tom Fodstad and Cato Erstad). After the season, Finbråten was wanted by Kongsvinger, a team he had trained with prior to joining Hamkam.

In 1989, Finbråten recorded the assist as Hamkam achieved a surprise 1–0 win over Rosenborg, knocking the Trondheim team out of the 1989 Norwegian Football Cup. In the 1989 Finbråten had two assists in a 7–0 thrashing of Bodø/Glimt, which secured Hamkam a place in the playoffs for the first tier. Hamkam did not succeed in the playoffs, however. Finbråten was sidelined in the playoff games, his leg being broken and in a cast.

Ahead of the 1990 season, the press reported that Moss FK made a transfer bid for Finbråten. Moss FK denied that the offer was as high as the reported 200,000 kr, and Hamkam turned the offer down regardless. According to Eidsvold Blad, Hamkam's asking price was 300,000 kr, which in December deterred Viking FK from making a transfer offer, despite they too being interested in Finbråten. A return to Eidsvold Turn was even discussed, with Finbråten meeting coach Per Brogeland. In December 1989, however, Finbråten chose to renew his Hamkam contract until the end of 1990.

In 1991 he joined Lyn, whence Tom Fodstad had transferred the year before. The transfer fee was 125,000 kr. According to assistant manager Jo Lunder, Finbråten's strength was reading the play, as well as his technique, while he could improve his physical strength and stamina. Finbråten played every single match of both the 1991 and 1992 Eliteserien, scoring 2 goals in each season. Following Finbråten's third consecutive season with Lyn in Eliteserien, the team was relegated.

== Post-playing career ==
Finbråten retired to pursue a job in Pfizer. In the spring of 1995 he made a comeback for Eidsvold Turn.

In 2009 he moved to Voss Municipality, Norway with his family. He became youth coach in FBK Voss. Ahead of the 2019 season he became assistant coach of FBK Voss. In early 2020 he started out as marketing director of the same club. His first two years was greatly hampered by the COVID-19-related lockdowns of sport, but he was praised for working towards an increased government compensation for economic losses suffered by sports teams.
