= Freudenberger =

Freudenberger is a German surname. Notable people with the surname include:

- Herbert Freudenberger (1927–1999), German-born American psychologist
- Nell Freudenberger (born 1975), American novelist
- Schraga Har-Gil (1926–2009), born Paul-Philipp Freudenberger, German-Israeli journalist and writer
- Sigmund Freudenberger (1745–1801), Swiss painter
