= Johannes Hjellbrekke =

Norwegian sociologist

Johannes Hjellbrekke (born 1965) is a Norwegian sociologist. He is Professor of Sociology at the University of Bergen and was editor-in-chief of Sosiologisk tidsskrift (the Norwegian Journal of Sociology) from 2003 to 2005. He was appointed as Associate Professor of Sociology at the University of Bergen in 2005, and became full Professor in 2010. He has been a visiting scholar/professor at the University of York, EHESS/Paris, UC Berkeley and New York University. He is noted for his research on social class, elites, power, and social mobility. In 2024 Hjellbrekke became a member of the Norwegian Academy of Science and Letters.

== Selected publications ==
- Savage, Mike, Fiona Devine, Niall Cunningham, Mark Taylor, Yaojun Li, Johs. Hjellbrekke, Brigitte Le Roux, Sam Friedman, Andrew Miles: "A New Model of Social Class: Findings from the BBC's Great British Class Survey Experiment. Sociology 2013; Volume 47 (2) s. 219-250: (http://soc.sagepub.com/content/early/2013/03/12/0038038513481128.abstract
- Hjellbrekke. Johs. & Korsnes, Olav. Sosial mobilitet. Oslo: Det Norske Samlaget (2012). (http://www.samlaget.no/nn-no/utdanning/hu/boeker/samfunnsvitskap/sosiologi/sosial-mobilitet.aspx).
- François Denord, Johs. Hjellbrekke, Olav Korsnes, Frédéric Lebaron and Brigitte Le Roux: "Social capital in the field of power: the case of Norway". The Sociological Review, 59:1 (2011), pp. 86–108.
- Hjellbrekke, Johs. & Olav Korsnes: "Nedturar. Deklassering i det seinmoderne Noreg." Nytt Norsk Tidsskrift, nr. 1-2, 2010 (årg. 27), pp. 46–59.
- Hjellbrekke, Johs. & Oddgeir Osland: "Pierre Bourdieu - maktkritikk som sysifosarbeid". I Pedersen, Jørgen (ed.) Moderne politisk teori. Oslo: Pax forlag,(2010), pp. 273–293.
- Hjellbrekke, Johs. & Olav Korsnes: "At studere magtfeltet". I Hammerslev, Hansen & Willig (red.), Refleksiv sociologi i praksis, København: Hans Reitzels forlag, pp. 147–170.
- Hjellbrekke, Johs. & Olav Korsnes: "Quantifying the Field of Power in Norway". Robson & Sanders (eds.) Quantifying Theory: Pierre Bourdieu. Springer Netherlands (2009), pp. 31–46
- Hjellbrekke Johs. & Korsnes, Olav. "Kjønn, familie og mobilitet". In Christensen & Syltevik (eds.) Kvinners arbeid, Oslo: Unipub (2009), pp. 119–140.
- Hjellbrekke, J. B. Le Roux, O. Korsnes, F. Lebaron, H. Rouanet and L. Rosenlund. (2007): ”The Norwegian Field of Power anno 2000”. In: European Societies 9 (2), May, pp. 245–273.
- Gåsdal, Løyning, Hjellbrekke & Brusdal (eds.). Makt, mening og struktur: Festskrift til Sigmund Grønmo. Bergen: Fagbokforlaget (2007), ISBN 978-82-450-0545-5
- "Maurice Halbwachs," in Scott, John (ed.) 50 Key Sociologists. The Formative Theorists. London: Routledge (2007). pp. 61–64.
- Hjellbrekke, Johs. & Olav Korsnes: Sosial mobilitet. Oslo: Det norske samlaget. (2006)
- Hjellbrekke, Johs. & Olav Korsnes: “Sosial kapital-strukturar i norske elitar”. I Tidsskrift for samfunnsforskning, 4/2005, årgang 46. s. 467-502.
- Hjellbrekke, Johs. & Olav Korsnes: “Educational Mobility Trajectories and Mobility Barriers in the Norwegian Social Space.” International Journal of Contemporary Sociology, vol. 41, 2/2004, pp. 163–189.
- Hjellbrekke, Johs. & Olav Korsnes:Det norske maktfeltet: Interne strukturar, homogamitendensar, mobilitetsbaner og –barrierar i norske elitar. Rapport nr. 71, Makt- og demokratiutgreiinga sin rapportserie. Oslo: Unipub forlag. (2003).
- "Ulike tilnærmingar til 'sosial kapital' i sosiologi og statsvitskap." Sosiologisk tidsskrift, 3(2000),209-228.
- Johs. Hjellbrekke & Oddgeir Osland "Den symbolske dominansen og «det kommunikative mistaket»: Om Bourdieu sin praksisteori i studiar av det politiske feltet." Statsvitenskapelig tidskrift nr. 1, 2000, s. 3-32.
- Yard Work and Worker Memories. An Analysis of Fields and Practices of Remembering from a Relationist' Standpoint. Skriftserien, Sosiologisk Institutt, UiB, 2000.
