= Kaare Sparby =

Norwegian politician

Kaare Sparby (25 June 1904 – 23 October 2001) was a Norwegian politician for the Conservative Party.

He served as a deputy representative to the Norwegian Parliament from Hedmark during the term 1945–1949.

He was an engineer by profession.
