= Kåre Fostervold =

Norwegian politician (born 1969)

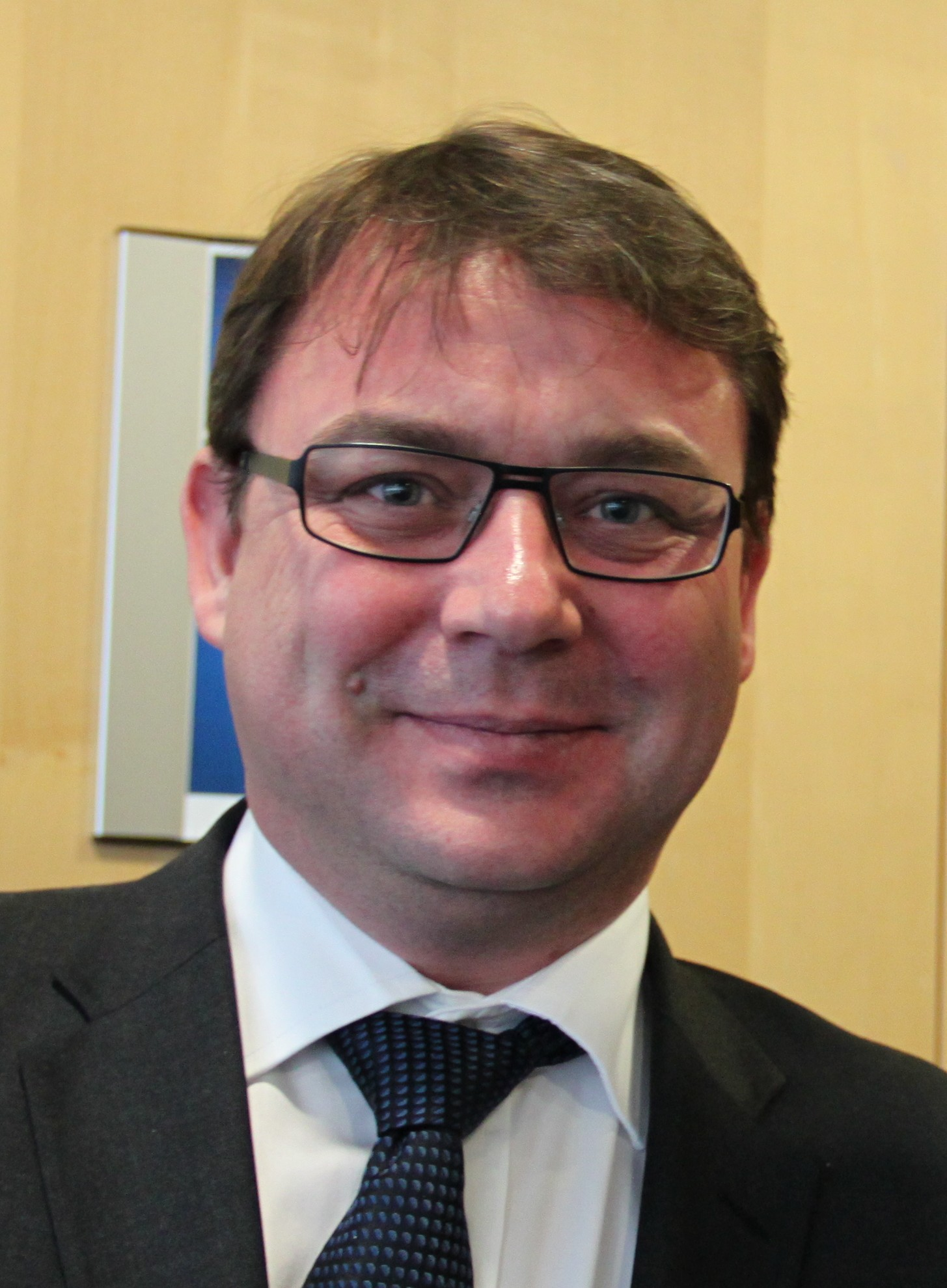
Portrait of Kåre Fostervold

Kåre Fostervold (born 10 October 1969 in Porsgrunn) is a Norwegian politician for the Progress Party.

He was elected to the Norwegian Parliament from Telemark in 2005.

On the local level Fostervold was a member Porsgrunn municipality council from 1999 to 2007.

Outside politics he has worked as an electrician.
