= Steinar Karlstrøm =

Norwegian politician (born 1965)

Steinar Karlstrøm (born 8 April 1965) is a Norwegian politician for the Labour Party.

He served as a deputy representative to the Parliament of Norway from Finnmark during the term 2017–2021. He hails from Alta.
