= Nils Tvedt =

Norwegian diver (1883–1965)

Personal information
- Nationality: Norwegian
- Born: 19 September 1892 Fusa Municipality, Norway
- Died: 25 May 1965 (aged 82)

Sport
- Sport: Diving

Nils Tvedt (19 September 1892 – 25 May 1973) was a Norwegian diver. He was born in Fusa Municipality, and competed for Bergen Svømme- og Livredningsklubb. He participated at the 1912 Summer Olympics in Stockholm.
