= Martin Friis =

Norwegian ice hockey player (born 1965)

Personal information
- Born: 18 November 1965 (age 60) Oslo, Norway

Sport
- Sport: Ice hockey

Martin Friis (born 18 November 1965) is a Norwegian former ice hockey player. He was born in Oslo, Norway. He played for the Norwegian national ice hockey team at the 1992 Winter Olympics.
