= Christian Styren =

Norwegian diver

Personal information
- Nationality: Norwegian
- Born: 31 January 1965 (age 60); Oslo

Sport
- Country: Norway
- Sport: Diving

Christian Styren (born 31 January 1965) is a Norwegian diver. He was born in Oslo. He competed at the 1992 Summer Olympics in Barcelona. He won thirteen gold medals in diving at the Norwegian championships.
