= Ingvil Smines Tybring-Gjedde =

Norwegian politician

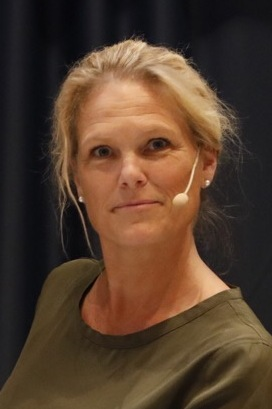

Minister of Public Security
- In office 22 January 2019 – 24 January 2020
- Prime Minister: Erna Solberg
- Preceded by: Office established
- Succeeded by: Office abolished

State Secretary for the Ministry of Petroleum and Energy
- In office 16 December 2015 – 22 January 2019
- Prime Minister: Erna Solberg
- Minister: Tord Lien; Terje Søviknes; Kjell-Børge Freiberg

Personal details
- Born: 8 July 1965 (age 60) Oslo, Norway
- Party: Progress
- Spouse: Christian Tybring-Gjedde
- Children: 4
- Occupation: Politician

Ingvil Smines Tybring-Gjedde (born 8 July 1965) is a Norwegian politician for the Progress Party. She served as State Secretary at the Ministry of Petroleum and Energy from 2015 to 2019, and minister of public security from 2019 until the Progress Party withdrew from government in 2020.

== Career ==
=== Minister of Public Security ===
After the Christian Democratic Party joined the Solberg Cabineg on 22 January 2019, Tybring-Gjedde was appointed Minister of Public Security in the Ministry of Justice and Public Security.

== Personal life ==
She is married to politician Christian Tybring-Gjedde, with whom she has four children.
