= Kåre Verpe =

Norwegian information worker and journalist

Kåre Johan Hansson Verpe (born 16 February 1949) is a Norwegian information worker and journalist.

From 2005 to 2010, he is the director of information in the Confederation of Norwegian Enterprise. He has a background as a publishing house editor, and is also a former journalist in Morgenbladet, Dagbladet and the Norwegian Broadcasting Corporation. He has a cand.mag. degree from the University of Oslo in 1976.
