= Kari Raustein =

Norwegian politician

Kari Raustein (born 27 July 1965) is a Norwegian politician for the Progress Party.

She served as a deputy representative to the Parliament of Norway from Rogaland during the term 2013–2017. She has been a member of Stavanger city council.
