= Gro Skartveit =

Norwegian politician (born 1965)

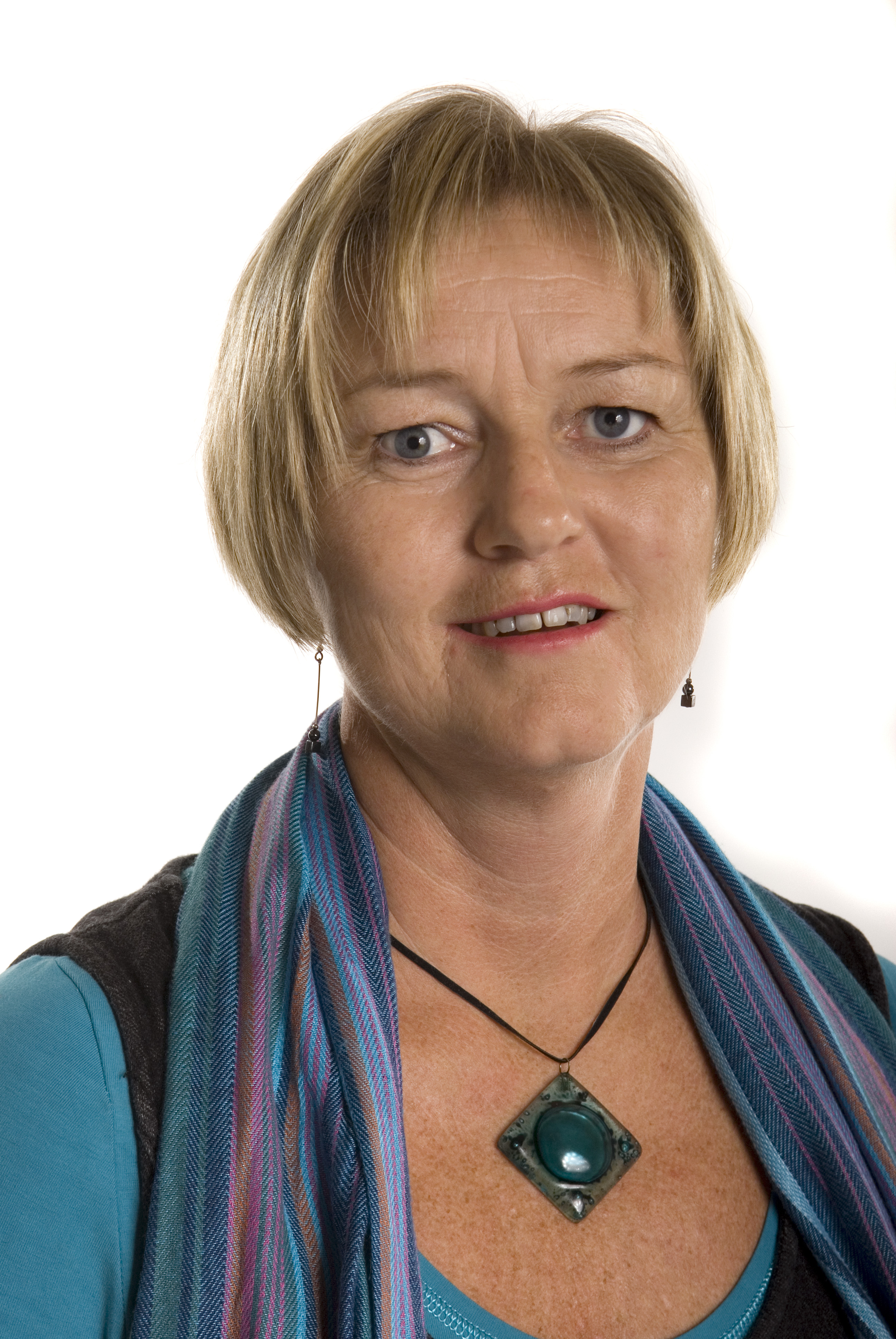
Gro Skartveit

Gro Skartveit (born 24 August 1965) is a Norwegian politician for the Liberal Party.

She was originally a member of the Christian Democratic Party, but left in 2001 after she came out as a lesbian.

She served as a deputy representative to the Norwegian Parliament from Rogaland during the term 2005–2009. On the local level, she has been a member of the municipal council of Stavanger Municipality, and is a member of Rogaland county council. She was mayor of Finnøy Municipality from 2011 to 2015.

She is also a member of the board of the Western Norway Regional Health Authority.

She hails from Finnøy Municipality.
