= Nina Lykke (writer) =

Norwegian writer (born 1965)

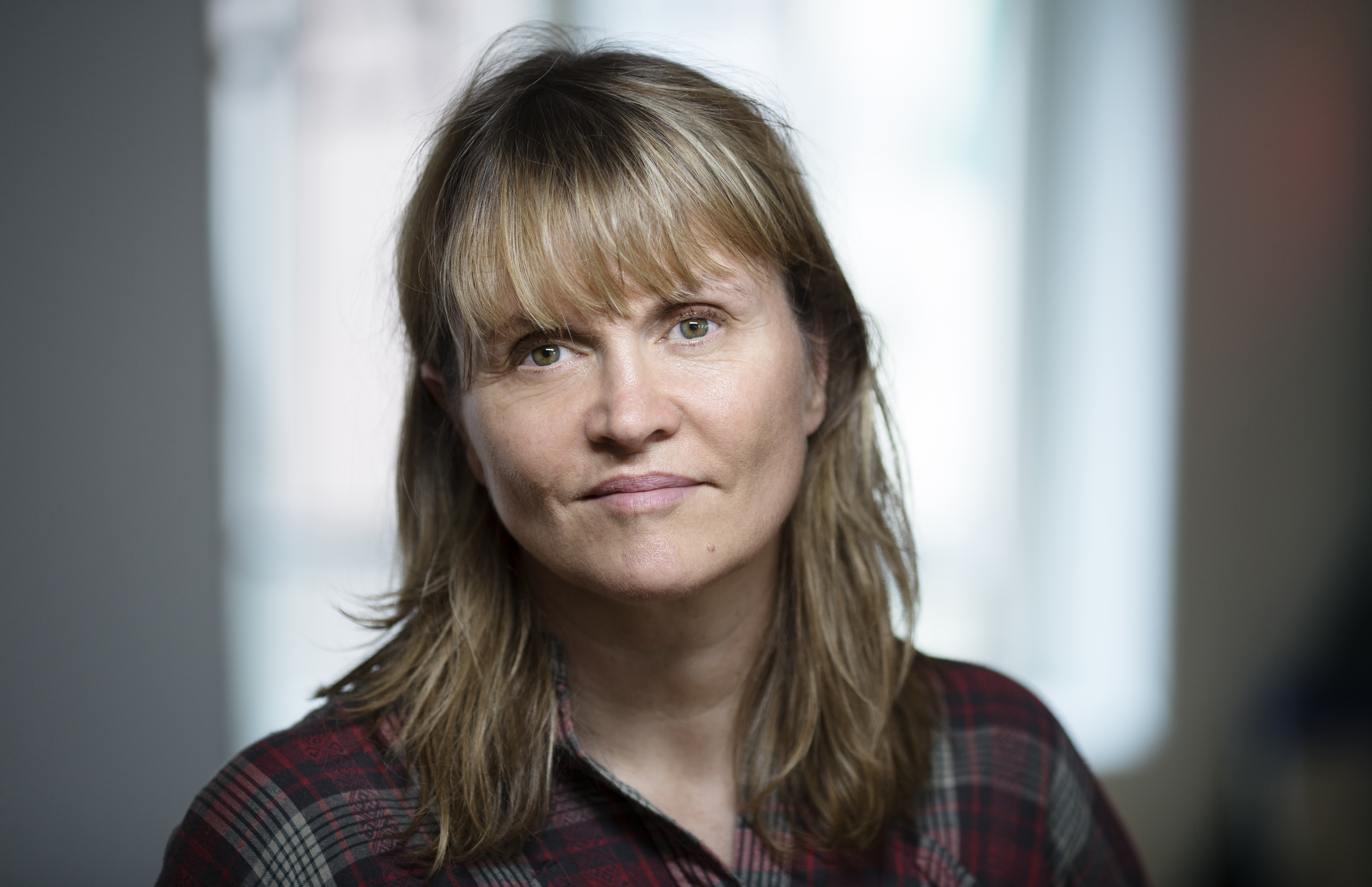
- Born: 1965 (age 60–61)
- Education: graphic design
- Alma mater: Den Grafiske Højskole
- Occupations: Novelist; Short story writer
- Notable work: Full spredning
- Awards: Brage Prize (2019); Riksmål Society Literature Prize (2022)

Nina Lykke (born 17 June 1965), is a Norwegian writer. Her literary themes include elements of dark satire mixed with humour and tragedy.

She received the Brage Prize in 2019, for the novel Full spredning, and the Riksmål Society Literature Prize in 2022, for the novel Vi er ikke her for å ha det morsomt.

== Personal life and education ==
Born on 17 June 1965, Lykke is educated as graphic designer from Den Grafiske Højskole in Copenhagen. She resides in Oslo and is the mother of two daughters.

== Career ==
Lykke made her literary debut in 2010 with the short story collection Orgien, og andre fortellinger. She followed up with the novel Oppløsningstendenser in 2013. Her novel Nei og atter nei, a family drama from 2016, was characterized as her literary breakthrough.

Lykke's literary themes includes elements of dark satire mixed with humour and tragedy. Her novel Full spredning from 2019, earned her the Brage Prize, and became a bestseller in Norway. Subtitled "En legeroman" (A doctor's novel), the principal character "Elin", who is a physician and has been married to "Axel" for two decades, finds everything turned upside down when her ex "Bjørn" appears on Facebook. She moves into her doctor's office in an absurd cohabitation with the plastic skeleton "Tore", with whom she has unpleasant dialogues. Thematics in the novel include infidelity, dissolution of marriage, and decadence of the middle class. As of 2023, the novel had been translated into 18 languages. A theatre adaptation was staged at Nationaltheatret in 2021.

The novel Vi er ikke her for å ha det morsomt from 2022 explores the Norwegian middle class, and also contains satiric comments on so-called reality literature. This novel earned her the Riksmål Society Literature Prize for 2022.
