= Kaare Frydenberg =

Norwegian businessperson (born 1950)

Kaare Frydenberg (born 30 April 1950) is a Norwegian businessperson.

== Education and early career ==
He was born at Bærum Hospital, graduated from upper secondary school at Nadderud in 1969 and attended Oslo Commerce School for one year. In 1974 he graduated from the Norwegian School of Management with a siv.øk. degree.

He started his career in the media. He was assisting director of the newspaper Aftenposten from 1977 to 1987, and the chief executive officer of Dagens Næringsliv from 1987 to 1989, overseeing its name change from Norges Handels- og Sjøfartstidende. From 1989 to 1996 he again worked for Aftenposten, first as deputy CEO, then as CEO.

== Later career ==
From 1996 to 2000 Frydenberg was the CEO of Pripps Ringnes, an amalgamation of Pripps and Ringnes which in 2001 was bought by Carlsberg Breweries. From 2000 to 2005 he was the CEO of Posten Norge, the Norwegian postal service. During his time as CEO, the company went through significant changes, among others with sizeable downsizing and the integration of postal offices into grocery stores, dubbed "Post i butikk" (lit. post-in-store). The company also made moves in the market, such as the buying of smaller company Nor-Cargo, to compensate for the general decline in the sending of letters.

Frydenberg was one of the best paid leaders of a Norwegian state-owned company, with a basic wage of 2,210,000 kr and total income (with bonus and other fees) of NOK 2,923,738 in 2004. When the partially state-owned companies Telenor, Norsk Hydro, DnB NOR and Statoil are excluded, Frydenberg emerged as the best paid leader of a fully state-owned company. Right below Frydenberg was Bård Mikkelsen of Statkraft, Kjell Pedersen of Petoro, and John G. Bernander of the Norwegian Broadcasting Corporation.

In 2005 Frydenberg started working as a partner in Saga Corporate Management. In this job, he has been loaned out to companies that need a temporary business executive. The best-known job since 2005 has been CEO of Scandinavian Property Development (SPDE). The company ventured into selling property at Fornebu, but the actual development was very slow. The company struggled with slim income and high loans. Frydenberg was brought in to replace the fired CEO Stein Haugbro on 1 September 2008, and resigned in March 2009.

Frydenberg has also been chairman of ErgoGroup, Arcus, Asker og Bærums Budstikke, Dinamo Forlag, Hotel Continental, Oslo and NKI-gruppen, and a board member of Dagens Næringsliv.

He is married and has two children, and resides at Bekkestua.
