= May Grethe Lerum =

Norwegian novelist (born 1965)

May Grethe Lerum (born 5 May 1965 in Sogn) is a Norwegian novelist. She is the author of the novel series Livets doetre (35 books) and Solgudens krukke (10 books).
