= CUNY Graduate School of Public Health and Health Policy =

Graduate school in New York City

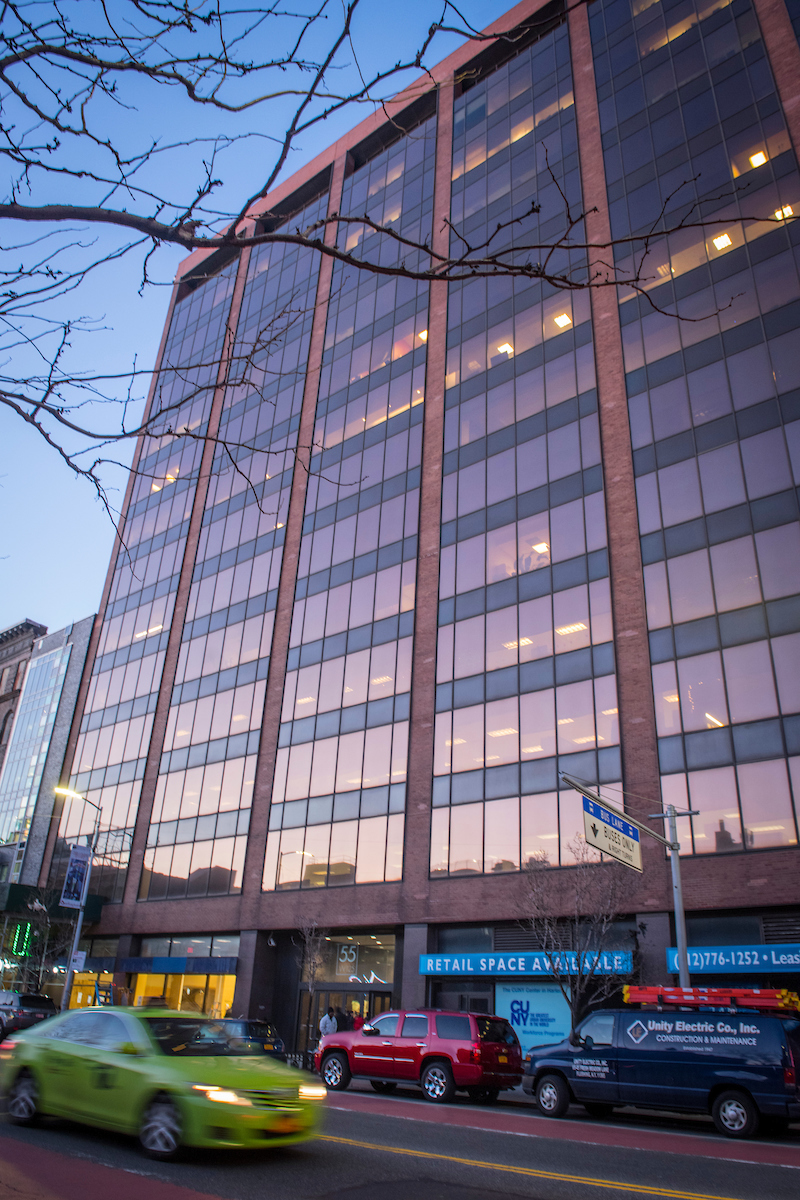
- Type: Public
- Established: 2007
- Dean: Dr. Ayman El-Mohandes
- Faculty: 50 faculty
- Location: New York City, New York, United States; 40°47′59″N 73°56′20″W
- Campus: Urban
- Website: http://sph.cuny.edu/

The CUNY Graduate School of Public Health and Health Policy (CUNY SPH) is a public American research and professional college within the City University of New York (CUNY) system. The graduate school is located at 55 West 125th Street in New York City.

The dean of the school is Ayman El-Mohandes.

The chairs of the departments are Terry Huang (Health Policy and Management), Spring Cooper (Community Health and Social Sciences), Levi Waldron (Epidemiology and Biostatistics) and Brian Pavilonis (Environmental, Occupational and Geospatial Health Sciences).

== Academics ==
CUNY SPH is accredited by the Council on Education for Public Health (CEPH). The Accreditation Board for Engineering Technology (ABET) accredits the MS-EOHS program.

CUNY SPH offers accredited master's and doctorate degrees, with specializations, and certificates.

CUNY SPH offers the following graduate degrees:

- Master's Degree Programs
  - MPH in Community Health
  - MPH in Environmental and Occupational Health Sciences
  - MPH in Epidemiology and Biostatistics
  - MPH in Health Policy and Management
  - MPH in Public Health Nutrition
  - MS in Environmental and Occupational Health Sciences
  - MS in Global and Migrant Health Policy
  - MS in Population Health Informatics
  - MS in Health Communication for Social Change
- Doctoral Degree Programs
  - PhD in Community Health and Health Policy
  - PhD in Environmental and Planetary Health Sciences
  - PhD in Epidemiology

CUNY SPH offers the following specializations

- Maternal, Child, Reproductive, and Sexual Health

CUNY SPH offers the following certificates

- Advanced Certificate in Public Health
- Advanced Certificate in Industrial Hygiene

== Affiliations ==
CUNY SPH faculty are affiliated with the following CUNY research centers and institutes:

- CUNY Urban Food Policy Institute
- CUNY Institute for Implementation Science in Population Health
- Center for Immigrant, Refugee, and Global Health
- Healthy CUNY Initiative
- Center for Innovation in Mental Health
- CUNY Center for Systems and Community Design
- NYU-CUNY Research Prevention Center
- ENERGY Center

== History ==
In September 2006, CUNY Chancellor Matthew Goldstein announced a plan to create a graduate school of public health to open within five years. The school would have an urban focus and bring together the university's public health programs at Brooklyn, Lehman and Hunter Colleges and the Graduate Center, as well as other faculty with relevant expertise from around the university. The chancellor designated Hunter College as the lead institution because it had the largest and oldest public health program, accredited by the Council on Education for Public Health, the national body that accredits public health programs and schools, since 1972.

In October 2009, the Council on Education for Public Health accepted CUNY's application to be reviewed for transforming its accredited programs in public health into a single school of public health. The review process began in 2010 and was completed in 2011.

In September 2013, Dr. Ayman El-Mohandes was named dean.

In November 2015, the CUNY trustees approved the consolidation of the school into the unified CUNY Graduate School of Public Health & Health Policy.

In October 2022, the Governor of New York Kathy Hochul and Mayor of New York City Eric Adams announced the development of a future site for the CUNY Graduate School of Public Health and Health Policy.
