= 1996 Norwegian Football Cup =

Norgesmesterskapet i fotball for herrer

Tournament details
- Country: Norway
- Teams: 128 (main competition)

Final positions
- Champions: Tromsø (2nd title)
- Runners-up: Bodø/Glimt

Tournament statistics
- Matches played: 127
- Top goal scorer: Sigurd Rushfeldt (12)

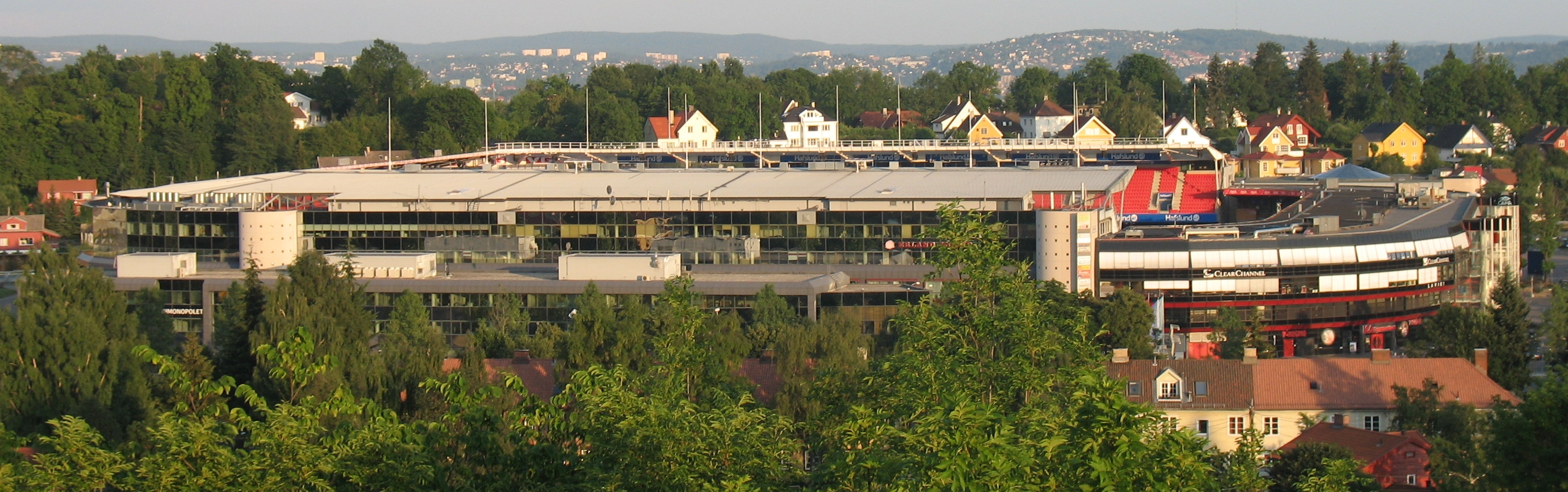
Ullevaal Stadion, Oslo - venue for the Norwegian Cup final

The 1996 Norwegian Football Cup was the 91st edition of the Norwegian Football Cup. The 1996 Norwegian Football Cup was won by Tromsø after they defeated Bodø/Glimt in the final with the score 2–1. This was the first time two teams from Northern Norway had met in the final.

== Calendar ==
Below are the dates for each round as given by the official schedule:

Round	Date(s)	Number of fixtures	Clubs
First Round	21–24 May 1996	64	128 → 64
Second Round	12 June 1996	32	64 → 32
Third Round	26–27 June 1996	16	32 → 16
Fourth Round	17 July 1996	8	16 → 8
Quarter-finals	14 August 1996	4	8 → 4
Semi-finals	21 September–2 October 1996	4	4 → 2
Final	27 October 1996	1	2 → 1

== First round ==
Team 1	Score	Team 2
21 May 1996
Averøykameratene	0–3	Molde
Hareid	2–3	Hødd
22 May 1996
Eiger	1–0	Klepp
Lyngen/Karnes	0–2	Skjervøy
Nybergsund	0–5	Faaberg
Silsand	2–3	Mjølner-Narvik
Snøgg	1–7	Eik-Tønsberg
Sortland	4–1	Grovfjord
Vardal	1–4	HamKam
23 May 1996
Alta	2–1 (a.e.t.)	Porsanger
Aurskog/Finstadbru	0–7	Jevnaker
Austrheim	0–8	Brann
Blaker	0–5	Lillestrøm
Bærum	0–2	Runar
Fart	1–1 (1–4 p)	Kongsvinger
Finnsnes	2–3	Tromsdalen
Flint	0–2	Odd Grenland
Follese	1–8	Åsane
Frigg	1–2	Grei
Galterud	1–4	Vålerenga
Gevir Bodø	1–3	Stålkameratene
Grorud	0–5	Skeid
Hovding	1–4	Fana
Hærland	1–5	Moss
Kolbotn	1–2	Drøbak/Frogn
Kolstad	1–2	Melhus
Kopervik	1–0	Os
Langesund	0–2	Start
Larvik Turn	1–3	Pors Grenland
Lofoten	1–1 (3–4 p)	Harstad
Mjøndalen	3–2	Drafn
Mo	1–6	Bodø/Glimt
Nardo	7–1	Orkdal
Nidelv	0–9	Rosenborg
Ny-Krohnborg	1–3	Fyllingen
Nymark	1–3	Haugesund
Orkanger	2–2 (5–4 p)	National
Rakkestad	0–1	Kjelsås
Randesund	1–1 (4–5 p)	Flekkefjord
Ranheim	2–1	Strindheim
Raufoss	3–2 (a.e.t.)	Strømmen
Riska	0–11	Vidar
Rælingen	2–3	Lyn
Råde	0–2	Stabæk
Sandefjord BK	2–1	Fossum
Sarpsborg FK	0–1	Falk
Sel	1–2	Åndalsnes
Skarbøvik	3–2	Aalesund
Sprint-Jeløy	1–0	Ullern
Stavanger	0–4	Viking
Steinkjer	1–2	Namsos
Stjørdals/Blink	1–2	Fauske/Sprint
Stryn	0–2	Sogndal
Trysil	1–3	Elverum
Ulf-Sandnes	3–1	Bryne
Ulfstind	0–8	Tromsø
Vard Haugesund	1–0	Stord
Verdal	0–3	Byåsen
Vindbjart	2–1	Vigør
Østsiden	3–2	Fredrikstad
Ålgård	4–2	Randaberg
Åmot	0–7	Strømsgodset
Åssiden	1–2	Ski
24 May 1996
Ørsta	2–3	Tornado

== Second round ==
Team 1	Score	Team 2
12 June 1996
Elverum	3–2	Drøbak/Frogn
Faaberg	1–4	Stabæk
Falk	3–2	Mjøndalen
Fauske/Sprint	0–10	Bodø/Glimt
Flekkefjord	0–6	Brann
Fyllingen	4–0	Skarbøvik
Grei	1–4	Kongsvinger
Harstad	6–0	Sortland
Haugesund	4–1	Kopervik
Kjelsås	0–6	HamKam
Lyn	2–0	Jevnaker
Melhus	0–2	Byåsen
Mjølner-Narvik	5–1	Stålkameratene
Molde	5–0	Orkanger
Moss	3–2 (a.e.t.)	Sprint-Jeløy
Namsos	1–5	Nardo
Pors Grenland	0–5	Eik-Tønsberg
Raufoss	1–3	Lillestrøm
Rosenborg	6–0	Ranheim
Runar	1–2	Odd Grenland
Ski	2–3	Vålerenga
Skjervøy	0–1	Tromsdalen
Start	1–0	Vindbjart
Strømsgodset	3–2	Sandefjord BK
Tornado	1–3	Hødd
Tromsø	2–1	Alta
Ulf-Sandnes	1–5	Viking
Vidar	1–3 (a.e.t.)	Eiger
Østsiden	0–6	Skeid
Ålgård	1–2	Fana
Åndalsnes	1–5	Sogndal
Åsane	2–0	Vard Haugesund

== Third round ==
Team 1	Score	Team 2
26 June 1996
Lillestrøm	0–1	Falk
Vålerenga	2–0	Fyllingen
27 June 1996
Bodø/Glimt	2–1	Mjølner-Narvik
Brann	2–0	Åsane
Byåsen	1–2	Molde
Eiger	1–4	Start
Eik-Tønsberg	2–3	Stabæk
Fana	0–1	Moss
HamKam	1–0	Nardo
Hødd	1–7	Rosenborg
Kongsvinger	2–0	Elverum
Odd Grenland	0–1	Strømsgodset
Skeid	3–1	Harstad
Sogndal	3–2	Lyn
Tromsdalen	3–8 (a.e.t.)	Tromsø
Viking	3–1	Haugesund

== Fourth round ==
17 July 1996

Bodø/Glimt	3–2	Brann
S. Johansen 18', 69'; Bjørkan 55'		Bakkerud 62'; Eftevaag 81'

Aspmyra Stadion, Bodø
Attendance: 2,680
Referee: Frode Kvam

17 July 1996

Falk	0–1	Skeid
		Enerly 79' (pen.)

Lystlunden, Horten
Attendance: 3,000
Referee: Thorbjørn Aass

17 July 1996

Molde	0–3	Kongsvinger
		Bergman 15'; Riseth 49'; Ingelstad 90'

Molde Stadion, Molde
Attendance: 2,200
Referee: Jon Skjervold

17 July 1996

Stabæk	4–2	Rosenborg
Larsen 5'; Belsvik 31'; Kaasa 48', 59'		Soltvedt 6'; Skammelsrud 75'

Nadderud Stadion, Bærum
Attendance: 4,562
Referee: Per-Arne Larsgård

17 July 1996

Start	2–2 (a.e.t.)	Moss
Robertson 64'; Pettersen 95'		Andresen 51', 106'
Penalties
Pettersen (penalty scored); Pedersen (penalty missed); Mykland (penalty scored); Lund (penalty scored); Robertson (penalty scored); Bjønsaas (penalty missed)	4–5	(penalty scored) Tangen; (penalty missed) Kollnes; (penalty scored) Andresen; (penalty scored) R. B. Johansen; (penalty scored) Olsen; (penalty scored) Solli

Kristiansand Stadion, Kristiansand
Attendance: 2,611
Referee: Terje Hauge

17 July 1996

Strømsgodset	2–0	Sogndal
Ødegaard 7'; Isaksen 30'

Marienlyst Stadion, Drammen
Attendance: 2,315
Referee: Rune Pedersen

17 July 1996

Tromsø	7–0	HamKam
S. Nielsen 22'; Folland 44' (o.g.); Årst 59'; Rushfeldt 66', 70'; Swift 82', 88'

Alfheim Stadion, Tromsø
Attendance: 1,977
Referee: Harald Hansen

17 July 1996

Vålerenga	2–1	Viking
Riisnæs 17'; Bergersen 64'		Østenstad 67'

Ullevaal Stadion, Oslo
Attendance: 3,119
Referee: Terje Singsaas

== Quarter-finals ==
14 August 1996

Moss	2–3	Kongsvinger
Andresen 16'; Olofsson 46'		Bergman 17'; Karlsrud 41', 85'

Melløs Stadion, Moss
Attendance: 2,791
Referee: Sven Kjelbrott

14 August 1996

Stabæk	1–5	Bodø/Glimt
Belsvik 44'		S. Johansen 14'; Berg 40', 45', 84'; Bjørkan 77'

Nadderud Stadion, Bærum
Attendance: 4,498
Referee: Rune Pedersen

14 August 1996

Strømsgodset	0–2	Vålerenga
		Riisnæs 58'; Haug 59'

Marienlyst Stadion, Drammen
Attendance: 6,753
Referee: Frode Kvam

15 August 1996

Skeid	0–2	Tromsø
		B. Johansen 24'; Rushfeldt 75'

Ullevaal Stadion, Oslo
Attendance: 2,227
Referee: Terje Hauge

== Semi-finals ==
=== First leg ===
21 September 1996

Kongsvinger	1–5	Bodø/Glimt
Noppi 10'		Johnsen 36' (pen.); Mikalsen 37', 83'; Ellingsen 63'; Hansen 89'

Gjemselund Stadion, Kongsvinger
Attendance: 4,229
Referee: Thorbjørn Aass

22 September 1996

Tromsø	0–0	Vålerenga

Alfheim Stadion, Tromsø
Attendance: 3,631
Referee: Jon Skjervold

=== Second leg ===
2 October 1996

Bodø/Glimt	2–0	Kongsvinger
Sørensen 18'; S. Johansen 32'

Aspmyra Stadion, Bodø
Attendance: 2,934
Referee: Per Arne Larsgård

Bodø/Glimt won 7–1 on aggregate.

2 October 1996

Vålerenga	0–3	Tromsø
		Hanssen 40'; Rushfeldt 81'; Årst 83'

Ullevaal Stadion, Oslo
Attendance: 6,471
Referee: Rune Pedersen

Tromsø won 3–0 on aggregate.

== Final ==
27 October 1996
13:15 CET (UTC+1)

Tromsø	2–1	Bodø/Glimt
Årst 79'; Rushfeldt 90'	Report	R. Berg 55'

Ullevaal Stadion, Oslo
Attendance: 22,683
Referee: Terje Hauge (Lyngbø)
