= 1996 Molde FK season =

Molde
1996 season
- Chairman: Lars Erik Frisvold
- Head coach: Åge Hareide
- Stadium: Molde Stadion
- Tippeligaen: 8th
- Norwegian Cup: Fourth round vs. Kongsvinger
- Top goalscorer: League: Ole Gunnar Solskjær (11); All: Ole Gunnar Solskjær; Arild Stavrum (12 goals each)
- Highest home attendance: 8,365 vs Lillestrøm (16 May 1996)
- Average home league attendance: 4,246

The 1996 season was Molde's 21st season in the top flight of Norwegian football. This season Molde competed in Tippeligaen, Norwegian Cup and the 1996–97 UEFA Cup.

In Tippeligaen, Molde finished in 8th position, 26 points behind winners Rosenborg.

Molde participated in the 1996 Norwegian Cup. They were knocked out in the fourth round by Kongsvinger with the score 0–3.

== Squad ==
Note: Flags indicate national team as defined under FIFA eligibility rules; some limited exceptions apply. Players may hold more than one non-FIFA nationality.

No.	Pos.	Nation	Player
1	GK	NOR	Morten Bakke
3	DF	NOR	Petter Christian Singsaas
4	DF	ESP	Flaco
5	DF	NOR	Knut Anders Fostervold
6	MF	NOR	Daniel Berg Hestad
7	MF	NOR	Ronald Wenaas
8	DF	NOR	Kjetil Ruthford Pedersen
9	MF	NOR	Odd Inge Olsen
10	FW	NOR	Ole Gunnar Solskjær
11	DF	NOR	Trond Andersen
12	MF	NOR	Bjarte Skuseth

No.	Pos.	Nation	Player
13	GK	NOR	Are Lervik
14	DF	NOR	Sindre Rekdal
15	MF	NOR	Petter Rudi
16	FW	NOR	Arild Stavrum
17	DF	NOR	Trond Strande
19	FW	NOR	Andreas Lund
20	FW	NOR	Ole Bjørn Sundgot
21	MF	NOR	Stian Ohr
22	DF	NOR	Ole Erik Stavrum
24	MF	NOR	Per Olav Sætre
25	MF	NOR	Anders Hasselgård

== Friendlies ==
19 January 1996	Molde	1 – 4	Viking	Kristiansand
CET (UTC+1)	Goal	Report	Goal	Stadium: Sørlandshallen

20 January 1996	Molde	1 – 1	Vålerenga	Kristiansand
CET (UTC+1)	Goal	Report	Goal	Stadium: Sørlandshallen

21 January 1996	Start	2 – 1	Molde	Kristiansand
CET (UTC+1)	Goal	Report	Goal	Stadium: Sørlandshallen

27 January 1996	Molde	5 – 2	HamKam	Bø, Telemark
CET (UTC+1)	Goal	Report	Goal	Stadium: Telemarkshallen

28 January 1996	Molde	3 – 0	Vålerenga	Bø, Telemark
CET (UTC+1)	Goal	Report		Stadium: Telemarkshallen

3 February 1996	Bodø/Glimt	1 – 0	Molde	Bodø
CET (UTC+1)	Goal	Report		Stadium: Nordlandshallen

10 February 1996	Molde	4 – 3	Brann	Molde
CET (UTC+1)	Goal	Report	Goal	Stadium: Lubbenes kunstgress

17 February 1996	Molde	4 – 1	Rosenborg	Bø, Telemark
CET (UTC+1)	Goal	Report	Goal	Stadium: Telemarkshallen

18 February 1996	Molde	1 – 1 (7–6 p)	Bodø/Glimt	Bø, Telemark
CET (UTC+1)	Goal	Report	Goal	Stadium: Telemarkshallen

23 February 1996	Molde	4 – 1	Aalesund	Molde
CET (UTC+1)	Goal	Report	Goal	Stadium: Lubbenes kunstgress

8 March 1996	Rosenborg	2 – 1	Molde	Lade, Trondheim
CET (UTC+1)	Goal	Report	Goal

12 March 1996	Molde (Norway)	1 – 1	(Sweden) Örgryte	Cyprus
CET (UTC+1)	Goal	Report	Goal

14 March 1996	Molde (Norway)	1 – 0	(Sweden) Halmstad	Cyprus
CET (UTC+1)	Goal	Report

16 March 1996	Molde	1 – 0	Lillestrøm	Cyprus
CET (UTC+1)	Goal	Report

20 March 1996	Molde	2 – 2	Hødd	Molde
CET (UTC+1)	Goal	Report	Goal	Stadium: Lubbenes kunstgress

23 March 1996	Molde	0 – 1	Vålerenga	Molde
CET (UTC+1)		Report	Goal	Stadium: Lubbenes kunstgress

1 April 1996	Molde	8 – 1	Overgras	Malta
CET (UTC+1)	Goal	Report	Goal

3 April 1996	Molde (Norway)	3 – 2	Malta	Malta
CET (UTC+1)	Goal	Report	Goal

9 April 1996	Brann	1 – 1	Molde	Bergen
CET (UTC+1)	Goal	Report	Goal

== Competitions ==
=== Tippeligaen ===
==== Results summary ====
Overall								Home						Away					
Pld	W	D	L	GF	GA	GD	Pts	W	D	L	GF	GA	GD	W	D	L	GF	GA	GD
26	9	6	11	45	38	+7	33	6	3	4	27	11	+16	3	3	7	18	27	−9

Source: nifs.no

==== Positions by round ====
Round	1	2	3	4	5	6	7	8	9	10	11	12	13	14	15	16	17	18	19	20	21	22	23	24	25	26
Ground	A	H	A	H	A	H	A	H	H	A	H	A	H	H	A	H	A	H	A	H	A	A	H	A	H	A
Result	L	W	L	L	W	W	W	D	W	D	W	L	W	L	D	W	W	L	L	L	L	L	D	D	D	L
Position	12	6	10	11	9	5	4	4	3	4	4	5	4	4	4	3	3	3	4	4	7	9	9	7	7	8

Source: see below

==== Results ====
14 April 1996 1	Rosenborg	2 – 0	Molde	Trondheim
CET (UTC+1)	Stensaas 70'; Heggem 89'	Report		Stadium: Lerkendal Stadion; Attendance: 18,950; Referee: Rune Pedersen

21 April 1996 2	Molde	8 – 0	Moss	Molde
CET (UTC+1)	Solskjær 9', 23', 80'; Sundgot 18', 55'; Stavrum 35', 47', 69'	Report		Stadium: Molde Stadion; Attendance: 4,918; Referee: Terje Hauge

27 April 1996 3	Start	4 – 2	Molde	Kristiansand
CET (UTC+1)	Dahlum 13'; Pettersen 57' (pen.); Lund 75'; Pedersen 70' (o.g.)	Report	Sundgot 15'; Olsen 27'	Stadium: Kristiansand Stadion; Attendance: 2,608; Referee: Roy Helge Olsen

1 May 1996 4	Molde	0 – 1	Skeid	Molde
CET (UTC+1)		Report	Michelsen 80'	Stadium: Molde Stadion; Attendance: 5,051; Referee: Tore Hollung

5 May 1996 5	Strømsgodset	1 – 3	Molde	Drammen
CET (UTC+1)	Isaksen 47' (pen.)	Report	Hestad 50'; Unknown (o.g.); A. Stavrum 71'	Stadium: Nedre Eiker Stadion; Attendance: 3,119; Referee: Jonny Ditlefsen

9 May 1996 6	Molde	2 – 0	Kongsvinger	Molde
CET (UTC+1)	Sundgot 2'; Solskjær 60'	Report		Stadium: Molde Stadion; Attendance: 3,083; Referee: Harald Hansen

12 May 1996 7	Bodø/Glimt	1 – 3	Molde	Bodø
CET (UTC+1)	Bjørkan 59'	Report	Olsen 22'; Solskjær 81'; A. Stavrum 88'	Stadium: Aspmyra Stadion; Attendance: 3,956; Referee: Sven Kjelbrott

16 May 1996 8	Molde	0 – 0	Lillestrøm	Molde
CET (UTC+1)		Report		Stadium: Molde Stadion; Attendance: 8,365; Referee: Frode Kvam

19 May 1996 9	Molde	3 – 0	Tromsø	Molde
CET (UTC+1)	Solskjær 25', 60'; Olsen 89'	Report		Stadium: Molde Stadion; Attendance: 4,486; Referee: Jon Eilif Skjervold

27 May 1996 10	Stabæk	3 – 3	Molde	Bærum
CET (UTC+1)	Belsvik 2', 7'; Gärdeman 67'	Report	Solskjær 21'; Hestad 28'; A. Stavrum 80' (pen.)	Stadium: Nadderud Stadion; Attendance: 4,025; Referee: Per-Arne Larsgård

5 June 1996 11	Molde	2 – 0	Vålerenga	Molde
CET (UTC+1)	Solskjær 18'; Olsen 24'	Report		Stadium: Molde Stadion; Attendance: 3,590; Referee: Rune Pedersen

9 June 1996 12	Brann	4 – 0	Molde	Bergen
CET (UTC+1)	Helland 7', 39'; Flo 14', 74'	Report		Stadium: Brann Stadion; Attendance: 11,207; Referee: Sven Kjelbrott

30 June 1996 14	Molde	0 – 3	Rosenborg	Molde
CET (UTC+1)		Report	Jakobsen 34', 68'; Brattbakk 83'	Stadium: Molde Stadion; Attendance: 7,110; Referee: Terje Hauge

7 July 1996 13	Molde	3 – 0	Viking	Molde
CET (UTC+1)	Sundgot 7'; Solskjær 56'; A. Stavrum 84'	Report		Stadium: Molde Stadion; Attendance: 3,592; Referee: Per-Arne Larsgård

14 July 1996 15	Moss	1 – 1	Molde	Moss
CET (UTC+1)	Olofsson 70'	Report	Sundgot 27'	Stadium: Melløs Stadion; Attendance: 3,468; Referee: Tommy Skjerven

21 July 1996 16	Molde	5 – 1	Start	Molde
CET (UTC+1)	Hestad 23'; O. Stavrum 31'; A. Stavrum 66', 87'; Solskjær 85'	Report	Lee Robertson 72'	Stadium: Molde Stadion; Attendance: 3,703; Referee: Roy Helge Olsen

11 August 1996 18	Molde	0 – 1	Strømsgodset	Molde
CET (UTC+1)		Report	Ødegaard 85'	Stadium: Molde Stadion; Attendance: 2,692; Referee: Tommy Skjerven

17 August 1996 19	Kongsvinger	1 – 0	Molde	Kongsvinger
CET (UTC+1)	Ingelstad 40'	Report		Stadium: Gjemselund Stadion; Attendance: 2,106; Referee: Tore Hollung

25 August 1996 20	Molde	1 – 2	Bodø/Glimt	Molde
CET (UTC+1)	A. Stavrum 3'	Report	Sørensen 11'; Johnsen 68'	Stadium: Molde Stadion; Attendance: 2,946; Referee: Frode Kvam

4 September 1996 21	Lillestrøm	3 – 0	Molde	Lillestrøm
CET (UTC+1)	Kristiansen 40'; Strandli 50'; Solbakken 86'	Report		Stadium: Åråsen Stadion; Attendance: 3,538; Referee: Rune Pedersen

8 September 1996 22	Tromsø	3 – 1	Molde	Tromsø
CET (UTC+1)	Årst 48'; Rushfeldt 63'; Johansen 89'	Report	Lund 6'	Stadium: Alfheim Stadion; Attendance: 2,917; Referee: Kjell Alseth

15 September 1996 23	Molde	0 – 0	Stabæk	Molde
CET (UTC+1)		Report		Stadium: Molde Stadion; Attendance: 2,352; Referee: Jarle Nilsen

18 September 1996 17	Skeid	1 – 5	Molde	Oslo
CET (UTC+1)	Berre 25'	Report	Lund 14', 90'; O. Stavrum 32'; Unknown 34' (o.g.); Hestad 47'	Stadium: Ullevaal Stadion; Attendance: 1,952; Referee: Tore Hollung

28 September 1996 24	Vålerenga	0 – 0	Molde	Oslo
CET (UTC+1)		Report		Stadium: Ullevaal Stadion; Attendance: 3,364; Referee: Jon Eilif Skjervold

13 October 1996 25	Molde	3 – 3	Brann	Molde
13:00 CET (UTC+1)	Sundgot 58', 75', 89'	Report	Brendesæter 25'; Flo 43', 47'	Stadium: Molde Stadion; Attendance: 3,310; Referee: Roy Helge Olsen

20 October 1996 26	Viking	3 – 0	Molde	Stavanger
13:00 CET (UTC+1)	Solberg 11'; Aase 56', 85'	Report		Stadium: Stavanger Stadion; Attendance: 5,608; Referee: Tommy Skjerven

==== League table ====
Pos	Team	Pld	W	D	L	GF	GA	GD	Pts	Qualification or relegation
6	Stabæk	26	9	9	8	47	45	+2	36	Qualification for the Intertoto Cup group stage
7	Kongsvinger	26	9	7	10	38	48	−10	34	Qualification for the Intertoto Cup group stage
8	Molde	26	9	6	11	45	38	+7	33	
9	Skeid	26	10	2	14	33	59	−26	32	
10	Bodø/Glimt	26	9	4	13	44	49	−5	31	

Source: fotball.no
Rules for classification: 1) points; 2) goal difference; 3) number of goals scored.

=== Norwegian Cup ===
21 May 1996 First round	Averøykameratene	0 – 3	Molde	Bruhagen, Averøy Municipality
CEST (UTC+2)		Report	Sundgot 7'; A. Stavrum 53'; Rekdal 88'	Stadium: Bruhagen Stadion; Attendance: 963; Referee: Øyvind Kringstad

12 June 1996 Second round	Molde	5 – 0	Orkanger	Molde
CEST (UTC+2)	O. Stavrum 9'; Fostervold 46'; Olsen 49', 89'; A. Stavrum 62'	Report		Stadium: Molde Stadion; Attendance: 515; Referee: Magne Tøsse

27 June 1996 Third round	Byåsen	1 – 2	Molde	Trondheim
CEST (UTC+2)	58'	Report	O. Stavrum 12'; Solskjær 31'	Attendance: 647

17 July 1996 Fourth round	Molde	0 – 3	Kongsvinger	Molde
CEST (UTC+2)		Report 1 Report 2	Bergman 15'; Riseth 49'; Ingelstad 90'	Stadium: Molde Stadion; Attendance: 2,200; Referee: Jon E. Skjervold

=== UEFA Cup ===
==== Qualifying round ====
6 August 1996 Qualifying round 1st leg	Dinamo Tbilisi (Georgia (country))	2 – 1	(Norway) Molde	Tbilisi, Georgia
CEST (UTC+2)	Gogichaishvili 13', (yellow card) 45'; Iashvili 18'; Dzheladze (yellow card) 57'; Lobzhanidze (yellow card) 80'	Report	Fostervold (yellow card) 23'; O. Stavrum 67'

20 August 1996 Qualifying round 2nd leg	Molde (Norway)	0 – 0 (1 – 2 agg.)	(Georgia (country)) Dinamo Tbilisi	Molde, Norway
CEST (UTC+2)		Report	Gogichaishvili (yellow card) 90'	Stadium: Molde Stadion; Attendance: 1,428

== Squad statistics ==
=== Appearances and goals ===
No.	Pos	Nat	Player	Total		Tippeligaen		Norwegian Cup		UEFA Cup	
No.	Pos	Nat	Player	Apps	Goals	Apps	Goals	Apps	Goals	Apps	Goals
1	GK	(Norway) NOR	Morten Bakke	31	0	25	0	4	0	2	0
3	DF	(Norway) NOR	Petter Christian Singsaas	29	0	23	0	4	0	2	0
4	DF	(Spain) ESP	Flaco	1	0	0	0	0	0	0+1	0
5	DF	(Norway) NOR	Knut Anders Fostervold	29	1	24	0	3	1	2	0
6	MF	(Norway) NOR	Daniel Berg Hestad	31	4	25	4	4	0	2	0
7	MF	(Norway) NOR	Ronald Wenaas	14	0	5+6	0	0+1	0	0+2	0
8	DF	(Norway) NOR	Kjetil Ruthford Pedersen	28	0	12+10	0	1+3	0	2	0
9	MF	(Norway) NOR	Odd Inge Olsen	31	6	24+1	4	4	2	2	0
10	FW	(Norway) NOR	Ole Gunnar Solskjær	20	12	16	11	4	1	0	0
11	DF	(Norway) NOR	Trond Andersen	25	0	19+2	0	4	0	0	0
12	MF	(Norway) NOR	Bjarte Skuseth	4	0	0+2	0	0+2	0	0	0
13	GK	(Norway) NOR	Are Lervik	2	0	1+1	0	0	0	0	0
14	DF	(Norway) NOR	Sindre Rekdal	5	1	1+1	0	0+2	1	0+1	0
15	MF	(Norway) NOR	Petter Rudi	32	0	26	0	4	0	2	0
16	FW	(Norway) NOR	Arild Stavrum	31	12	25	10	4	2	2	0
17	DF	(Norway) NOR	Trond Strande	22	0	8+9	0	1+2	0	2	0
19	FW	(Norway) NOR	Andreas Lund	6	3	6	3	0	0	0	0
20	FW	(Norway) NOR	Ole Bjørn Sundgot	32	10	25+1	9	4	1	2	0
21	MF	(Norway) NOR	Stian Ohr	6	0	1+3	0	0+1	0	0+1	0
22	DF	(Norway) NOR	Ole Erik Stavrum	28	5	21+2	2	3	2	2	1
24	DF	(Norway) NOR	Per Olav Sætre	1	0	0+1	0	0	0	0	0
25	MF	(Norway) NOR	Anders Hasselgård	4	0	1+2	0	0+1	0	0	0

=== Goalscorers ===
Rank	Position	Nat.	Player	Tippeligaen	Norwegian Cup	UEFA Cup	Total
1	FW	(Norway)	Ole Gunnar Solskjær	11	1	0	12
1	FW	(Norway)	Arild Stavrum	10	2	0	12
3	FW	(Norway)	Ole Bjørn Sundgot	9	1	0	10
4	MF	(Norway)	Odd Inge Olsen	4	2	0	6
5	MF	(Norway)	Ole Erik Stavrum	2	2	1	5
6	MF	(Norway)	Daniel Berg Hestad	4	0	0	4
7	FW	(Norway)	Andreas Lund	3	0	0	3
8	DF	(Norway)	Knut Anders Fostervold	0	1	0	1
8	DF	(Norway)	Sindre Rekdal	0	1	0	1
			Own goals	2	0	0	2
			TOTALS	45	10	1	56

== See also ==
- Molde FK seasons
