= 1996 Norwegian Football Cup final =

- Event: 1996 Norwegian Football Cup
Tromsø	Bodø/Glimt
2	1
- Date: 27 October 1996
- Venue: Ullevaal Stadion, Oslo
- Referee: Terje Hauge
- Attendance: 22,683

The 1996 Norwegian Football Cup final was the final match of the 1996 Norwegian Football Cup, the 91st season of the Norwegian Football Cup, the premier Norwegian football cup competition organized by the Football Association of Norway (NFF). The match was played on 27 October 1996 at the Ullevaal Stadion in Oslo, and opposed two Tippeligaen sides and the Northern Norway teams Tromsø and Bodø/Glimt. Tromsø defeated Bodø/Glimt 3–1 to claim the Norwegian Cup for a second time in their history.

== Route to the final ==
Tromsø			Round	Bodø/Glimt		
Ulfstind	8–0 (A)		Round 1	Mo	6–1 (A)	
Alta	2–1 (H)		Round 2	Fauske/Sprint	10–0 (A)	
Tromsdalen	8–3 aet (A)		Round 3	Mjølner-Narvik	2–1 (H)	
HamKam	7–0 (H)		Round 4	Brann	3–2 (H)	
Skeid	2–0 (A)		Quarterfinal	Stabæk	5–1 (A)	
Vålerenga	0–0 (H)	3–0 (A)	Semifinal	Kongsvinger	5–1 (A)	2–0 (H)

== Match ==
=== Details ===
27 October 1996
13:15 CET (UTC+1)

Tromsø	2–1	Bodø/Glimt
Årst 79'; Rushfeldt 90'	Report	R. Berg 55'

Ullevaal Stadion, Oslo
Attendance: 22,683
Referee: Terje Hauge (Lyngbø)

Tromsø	Bodø/Glimt

Tromsø:
GK	(Norway) Tor Andre Grenersen
DF	(Norway) Jonny Hanssen	(yellow card) 1'	(substituted off) 70'
DF	(Norway) Arne Vidar Moen
DF	(Norway) Steinar Nilsen		(substituted off) 46'
DF	(Norway) Morten Kræmer
MF	(Norway) Robin Berntsen
MF	(Norway) Bjørn Johansen
MF	(Norway) Per Egil Swift
MF	(Norway) Thomas Hafstad
FW	(Norway) Sigurd Rushfeldt
FW	(Norway) Ole Martin Årst	(yellow card) 51'
Substitutions:
GK	(Norway) Thomas Tøllefsen
DF	(Norway) Ole Andreas Nilsen
DF	(Norway) Stian Larsen		(substituted on) 46'
MF	(Norway) Bjørn Ludvigsen		(substituted on) 70'
FW	(Norway) Stein Berg Johansen
Coach:
(Norway) Terje Skarsfjord

Bodø/Glimt:
GK	(Norway) Rohnny Westad
DF	(Norway) Ola Haldorsen
DF	(Norway) Bent Inge Johnsen
DF	(Norway) Cato Hansen
DF	(Norway) Andreas Evjen	(yellow card) 30'
MF	(Norway) Runar Berg
MF	(Norway) Ørjan Berg	(yellow card) 58'
MF	(Norway) Thor Mikalsen
FW	(Norway) Aasmund Bjørkan
FW	(Norway) Stig Johansen
FW	(Norway) Jan-Derek Sørensen	(substituted off) 77'
Substitutions:
GK	(Norway) Tor Egil Horn
DF	(Norway) Helge Aune
DF	(Norway) Per-Ivar Steinbakk
MF	(Norway) Christian Berg
FW	(Norway) Terje Ellingsen	(substituted on) 77'
Coach:
(Norway) Trond Sollied
