= Bjørn Ludvigsen =

Norwegian footballer (1969–2025)

Personal information
- Full name: Bjørn Christian Ludvigsen
- Date of birth: 14 February 1969
- Place of birth: Harstad, Norway
- Date of death: 26 February 2025 (aged 56)
- Height: 1.88 m (6 ft 2 in)
- Position: Midfielder

Youth career
- Andenes IL
- Harstad IL

Senior career*
Years	Team	Apps	(Gls)
1986–1991	Harstad IL		
1992–1993	Tromsdalen UIL		
1994–1996	Tromsø IL	60	(1)
1997–2004	Harstad IL		
- * Club domestic league appearances and goals

Bjørn Christian Ludvigsen (14 February 1969 – 26 February 2025) was a Norwegian footballer who played as a midfielder.

== Career ==
Ludvigsen was born in Harstad Municipality, lived in Nesna Municipality and Andøy Municipality during his early childhood and started his youth football career in Andenes IL. At age 12 his family settled in Harstad, where he continued as a youth player in Harstad IL and eventually made his first-team debut. With Harstad, he played on Norway's second tier in 1989, but was also obliged to finish military training at the age of 20. He went on to Tromsdalen UIL in 1992.

According to a football pundit in the newspaper Tromsø, the 1993 season was the first where Ludvigsen recorded stable performances on a high level, the second tier in Norway. He was Tromsdalen's penalty shooter. Ahead of the 1994 season he moved on to the bigger club Tromsø IL.

He made his Tromsø IL debut together with Jonny Hanssen. Ludvigsen was described by manager Harald Aabrekk; "He is strong and has a very good stride. At the same time he goes along very well with Morten Kræmer on the left back. In Eliteserien, my only hope is that he doesn't become too frightful of failure".

He captained Tromsø for the first time against Mjølner in the 1995 cup. His contract expiring after the season, he was offered an extension with somewhat higher wages. After transfer interest from Moss FK did not materialize into anything, Ludvigsen signed.

Ludvigsen ultimately left Tromsø after featuring in the victorious 1996 Norwegian Football Cup Final. With the player being under contract for one more year, Tromsø was approached by Sogndal, Lyn and Harstad about a transfer. Ludvigsen's hometown club Harstad only offered a part-time contract, but also the prospect of a job within "international export marketing". Ludvigsen returned to Harstad IL, became player-coach and later served a second stint as Harstad IL's manager. He also managed the women's team of Medkila IL. From 2020 to 2024 he chaired the board of Harstad IL.

== Death ==
Ludvigsen died on 26 February 2025, at the age of 56.
