= Morten Pettersen =

Morten Pettersen can refer to:

- Morten Pettersen (footballer, born 1909)
- Morten Pettersen (footballer, born 1970)
