= Ole Gunnar Solskjær =

Norwegian footballer and manager (born 1973)

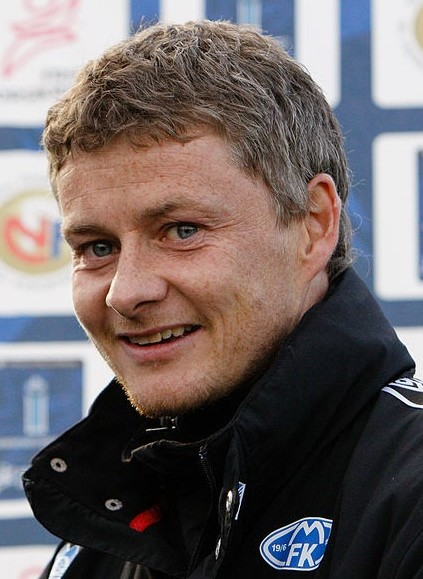
- Solskjær in 2011

Personal information
- Full name: Ole Gunnar Solskjær
- Date of birth: 26 February 1973 (age 53)
- Place of birth: Kristiansund, Norway
- Height: 1.78 m (5 ft 10 in)
- Position: Forward

Youth career
- 1980–1990: Clausenengen

Senior career*
Years	Team	Apps	(Gls)
1990–1995	Clausenengen	109	(115)
1995–1996	Molde	42	(31)
1996–2007	Manchester United	235	(91)
Total		386	(237)

International career
1994–1995	Norway U21	19	(13)
1995–2007	Norway	67	(23)

Managerial career
- 2011–2014: Molde
- 2014: Cardiff City
- 2015–2018: Molde
- 2018–2021: Manchester United
- 2025: Beşiktaş
- * Club domestic league appearances and goals

Ole Gunnar Solskjær (Norwegian pronunciation: [ˈûːlə ˈɡʉ̂nːɑr ˈsûːlʂæːr]; born 26 February 1973) is a Norwegian professional football manager and former player who was most recently manager of Beşiktaş. He spent the majority of his playing career with Manchester United and made 67 appearances for the Norway national team.

A forward, Solskjær began his career in his native Norway with Clausenengen, where he scored 115 goals in 109 league appearances over five seasons, helping the club earn promotion to the Norwegian Second Division in 1993. He then moved to Molde, newly promoted to the highest league in Norway, Tippeligaen, for the 1995 season. His goals helped Molde finish second and qualify for the UEFA Cup.

In July 1996, Solskjær joined Manchester United for a transfer fee of £1.5 million. Nicknamed "the Baby-faced Assassin", he made 366 appearances for United and scored 126 goals during a successful period for the club. Renowned as a "super-sub" for his knack of scoring late goals off the bench, he famously netted the dramatic injury-time winner against Bayern Munich in the 1999 UEFA Champions League final. That goal secured the treble for United, who had trailed 1–0 as the match entered stoppage time. He remained a regular player for the side until a serious knee injury sustained in 2003 began to plague his career. After several attempts to return, he announced his retirement from football in 2007.

Solskjær remained at Manchester United after retiring, taking on both a coaching role and ambassadorial duties. In 2008, he was appointed manager of the club's reserve team. He returned to Norway in 2011 to manage his former club, Molde, leading them to their first-ever Tippeligaen titles in his first two seasons. He added a third major honour by winning the 2013 Norwegian Football Cup. In 2014, Solskjær took charge of Cardiff City, though the club was relegated from the Premier League during his tenure. In late 2018, he returned to Manchester United as caretaker manager following the departure of José Mourinho, taking charge for the remainder of the 2018–19 season.

On 28 March 2019, after winning 14 of his first 19 matches in charge, Solskjær was appointed manager of Manchester United on a permanent basis with a three-year contract. He led the club to the 2021 UEFA Europa League final, where they were defeated by Villarreal in a penalty shoot-out. Following a poor run of results during the 2021–22 season, he was sacked by the club in November 2021. In January 2025, after three years out of management, Solskjær was appointed manager of Turkish Süper Lig club Beşiktaş, but was sacked in August 2025 after failing to qualify for European football.

== Early life ==
Solskjær was born in Kristiansund, Møre og Romsdal to Øyvind, a Greco-Roman wrestling champion, and Brita Solskjær. At the age of seven, he joined local football club Clausenengen, who were in the 3. divisjon. Solskjær supported Liverpool as a child. Between the ages of eight and ten, he followed in his father's footsteps and trained as a Greco-Roman wrestler, but gave it up due to being tossed around too much. Between 1992 and 1993, Solskjær completed a mandatory year's national service in the Norwegian Army.

== Club career ==
=== Early career at Clausenengen ===
Solskjær debuted for Clausenengen (CFK) at 17 years old in 1990. He participated in the Otta Cup, scoring seventeen goals in six matches. On 21 May 1993, CFK faced Molde in the Norwegian Football Cup, with Solskjær scoring Clausenengen's only goal in their 6–1 defeat. Clausenengen were promoted to the 2. divisjon in 1993, winning the 3. division by 12 points. Solskjær's final season at the club was in 1994, with him scoring 31 of CFK's 47 goals, helping the club achieve a mid-table finish of sixth place. In Solskjær's five years playing for Clausenengen, he averaged more than a goal a game in the league, scoring 115 goals in 109 matches.

=== Molde ===
==== 1995 season ====
On 14 February 1995, ahead of the start of the new season, he was signed by Åge Hareide, manager of newly promoted top-flight club Molde, for a fee of NOK150,000. On 22 April 1995, Solskjær made his debut for Molde against Brann, scoring twice in a 6–0 victory. In his second game on 29 April, Solskjær scored a hat-trick helping Molde 5–4 win over Viking. On 14 May, he scored another brace in a 2–1 win over Hamarkameratene. Two days later, he netted a hat-trick as Molde thrashed Hødd 7–2. Solskjær scored a penalty in Molde's 4–1 victory over Strindheim on 30 July.

On 10 August, Solskjær played in his first European competition, the qualification round for UEFA Cup Winners' Cup, against Belarusian team Dinamo-93 Minsk. Molde conceded in the first half but Solskjær managed to equalise in the 85th minute. He also scored in the second leg as Molde won 2–1 (3–2 on aggregate) and qualified for the UEFA Cup Winners' Cup proper. Molde were subsequently drawn against French team Paris Saint-Germain, Solskjær scored in the first leg on 14 September as the team lost 3–2 at Molde Stadion. He played in the away leg on 28 September, but Molde were outmatched and lost 3–0. Molde finished the season in second place, runners-up to Rosenborg by 15 points. In Solskjær's first season at Molde, he scored 20 goals in 26 matches in the 1995 Tippeligaen. Solskjær also formed a good strike-partnership with fellow forwards Arild Stavrum and Ole Bjørn Sundgot; because their surnames all started with the same letter, this led to them being referred to as "The Three S's".

==== 1996 season ====
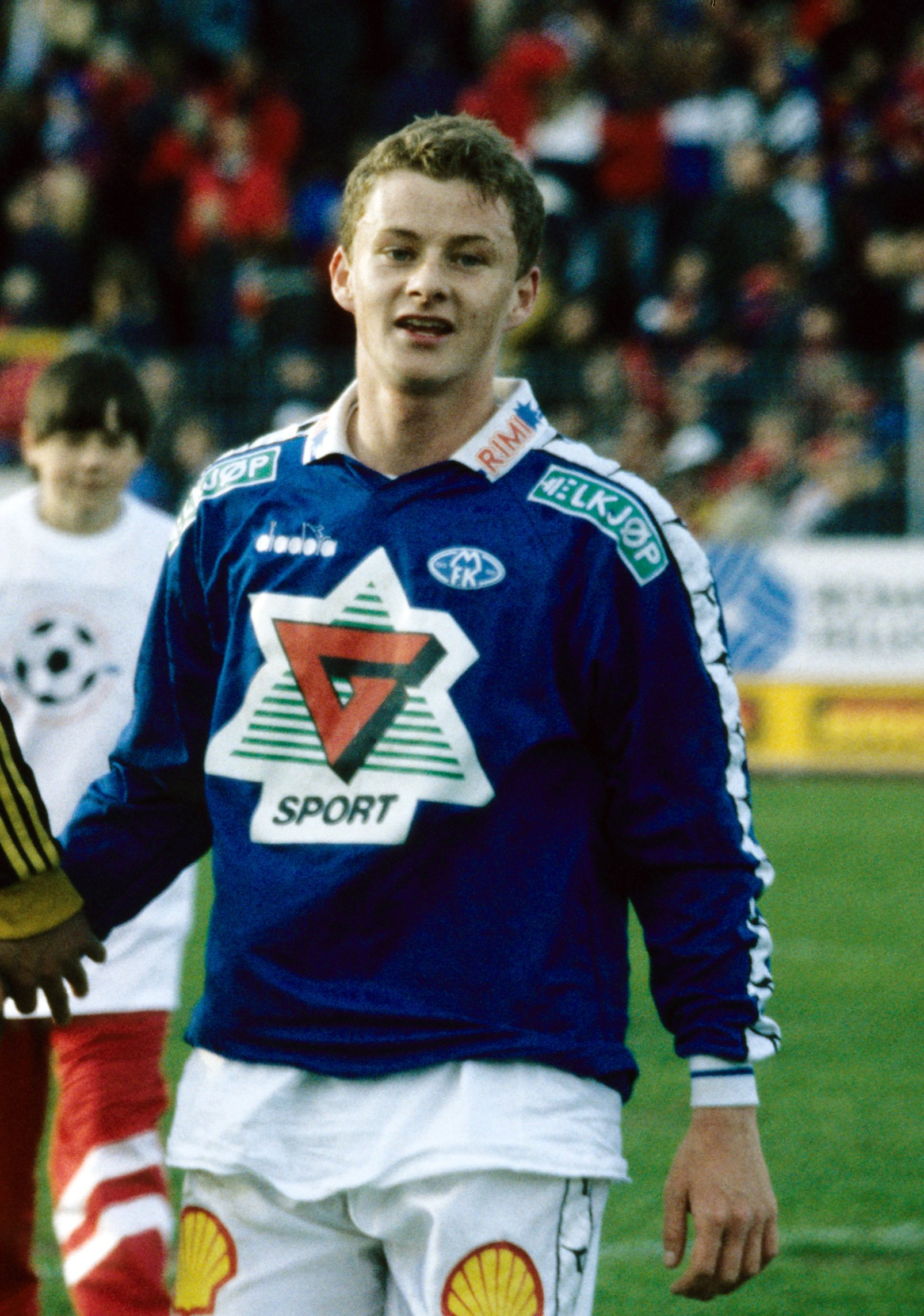
Solskjær after a game for Molde in 1996

Solskjær began the 1996 Tippeligaen in defeat, losing 2–0 to Rosenborg. However, in his next match on 21 April 1996 against Moss, he scored a hat-trick as Molde won 8–0. He scored a brace against Tromsø on 19 May in a 3–0 victory, and his goal-scoring form led to interest from Hamburg of Germany and Italian club Cagliari. Molde's then-manager, Åge Hareide, made Solskjær available to both Everton and Hareide's old club Manchester City for £1.2 million. However, neither Everton nor City were willing to take a risk on Solskjær, and the interest from Hamburg and Cagliari fell through after Manchester United submitted a bid of £1.5 million during Euro 1996, which Molde accepted. Solskjær made his final appearance for Molde on 21 July 1996 in a 5–1 win against Start, scoring the fourth goal in the 85th minute, before throwing his shirt to the crowd in celebration and receiving applause as he was substituted. He finished his time at Molde with 41 goals in 54 games in all competitions.

=== Manchester United ===
==== 1996–97 season: Debut ====
Solskjær joined Manchester United under Alex Ferguson on 29 July 1996, and was something of a surprise acquisition as he was almost unknown outside his homeland and at the time United were still in the hunt for Blackburn Rovers and England striker Alan Shearer, who then joined Newcastle United for a world-record £15 million. As the only striker to arrive at Old Trafford that year, it was widely expected that his first season would be spent as a backup to Eric Cantona and Andy Cole with only occasional first-team opportunities. However, within weeks of his arrival it was clear that he would be a key part of the first team sooner than had been anticipated, and would also prove himself to be one of the biggest Premier League bargains of the season.

He was issued with the number 20 shirt for the 1996–97 season, a squad number he would retain for the rest of his Manchester United career. He scored six minutes into his debut as a substitute against Blackburn Rovers on 25 August 1996, after replacing David May in the 64th minute. Solskjær made his first start on 14 September in a 4–1 win against Nottingham Forest, scoring United's first goal in the 22nd minute. On 25 September, he netted his first European goal for Manchester United in their 2–0 win over Rapid Wien, opening the scoring in the 20th minute. He scored his first brace for United against Tottenham Hotspur on 29 September, scoring the only goals of the game in the 38th and 58th minutes.

On 21 December, Solskjær scored his second brace of the season as United beat Sunderland 5–0, scoring in the 35th and 48th minutes. The Norwegian started in both of United's UEFA Champions League semi-final matches against Borussia Dortmund, which United lost 2–0 on aggregate to the eventual winners. He scored his third brace on 3 May 1997 against Leicester City in a 2–2 draw, netting in the 45th and 51st minutes. United clinched the title after Newcastle drew away at West Ham on 6 May, thus Solskjær won his first Premier League title. Solskjær scored 18 Premier League goals in 33 appearances (25 of which were starts) for United in his first season – the club's top goalscorer for that campaign. The British media nicknamed him "the Baby-faced Assassin" because of his youthful looks and his deadly finishing.

==== 1997–98 season ====
Solskjær scored his first goal of the 1997–98 season on 24 September 1997 in a 2–2 draw against Chelsea, equalising in the 86th minute after coming off the bench 20 minutes earlier. On 1 November, he scored a brace against Sheffield Wednesday during a 6–1 victory at Old Trafford, netting in the 41st and 75th minutes. Solskjær got his second brace on 30 November, scoring in the 18th and 53rd minutes of United's 4–0 victory over Blackburn Rovers. On 24 January 1998, he scored his third brace of the season in a 5–1 win against Division Two team Walsall in the FA Cup fourth round, adding the second and fourth goals in the 35th and 67th minutes. Solskjær started in the UEFA Champions League quarter-final second leg at Old Trafford against Monaco on 18 March (with the aggregate score at 0–0). David Trezeguet opened the scoring for Monaco inside five minutes, before Solskjær levelled in the 53rd minute, but United failed to score again and were knocked out on away goals.

Manchester United's match against Newcastle on 18 April would become a defining moment of Solskjær's career. The match was tied at 1–1, and Manchester United needed at least a draw to keep up with Arsenal in the race for the league title, with Solskjær being introduced in the 79th minute. Near the end of the game, Newcastle's Rob Lee had a clear goalscoring opportunity, running unopposed towards United's goal, but Solskjær had run across the entire field to commit a professional foul against him, thus denying Newcastle a winning goal. Solskjær did this knowing he would be sent off, and suspended for the coming matches. Supporters regarded this as an example of how Solskjær put the club above personal interest. This is the only red card Solskjær has received in his career. The Norwegian only managed six league goals in 22 appearances (15 starts) during his second season at the club, and despite his sacrifice against Newcastle, Arsenal beat Manchester United to the league title by a single point.

==== 1998–99 season: Continental Treble ====
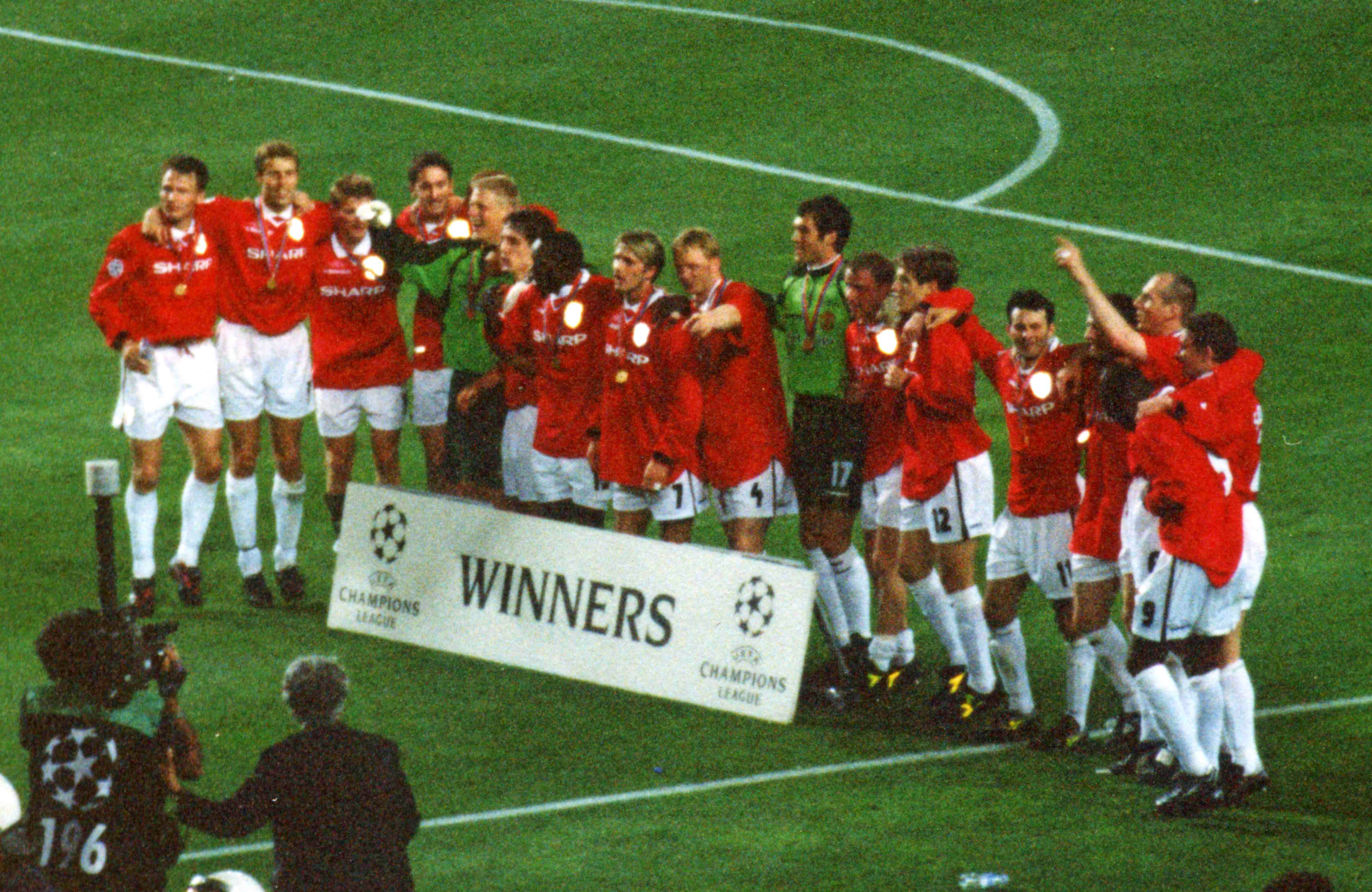
The Manchester United team, with Solskjær, celebrating after winning the UEFA Champions League in 1999

Solskjær stayed at Old Trafford even though other clubs showed interest in the player in 1998. He refused an offer from Tottenham Hotspur, after Manchester United had accepted a £5.5 million bid for him. He scored his first goals of the 1998–99 campaign in a 4–1 victory over Charlton Athletic on 9 September 1998, netting in the 38th and 63rd minutes. On 11 November, Solskjær put two past Nottingham Forest in a 2–1 win, helping United advance to the fifth round of the League Cup. He scored his third brace of the season against Tottenham Hotspur on 12 December, scoring in the 11th and 18th minute of an eventual 2–2 draw. After again turning down a move away from Manchester United, this time to West Ham, Solskjær came on in the 81st minute of Manchester United's FA Cup fourth round tie against rivals Liverpool on 24 January with United 1–0 down at the time; shortly after Dwight Yorke's equaliser, Solskjær scored the winning goal in injury time.

On 6 February, Solskjær came off the bench in the 71st minute during United's 8–1 win over Nottingham Forest and went onto to score four goals in the last 12 minutes of the match. This has been described as one of his most impressive feats. Manchester United sealed the Premier League title on 16 May, the last day of the season, against Tottenham Hotspur after coming from behind to win 2–1, with Solskjær winning his second Premier League title in three years. Solskjær started in the 1999 FA Cup final against Newcastle on 22 May, playing the whole match as United won 2–0 and completed the double.

On 26 May, Manchester United faced German team Bayern Munich in the 1999 UEFA Champions League final at Camp Nou. Mario Basler scored from a free kick in the sixth minute putting Bayern ahead. With United still trailing, Teddy Sheringham was introduced in the 67th minute, while Solskjær was brought on for Andy Cole in the 81st minute. Sheringham scored the equaliser at exactly 36 seconds into stoppage time, and shortly after the following kick-off United forced a corner. David Beckham took the corner kick, finding Sheringham who headed the ball across the goal, it then being poked into the roof of the net by Solskjær (the goal being timed at 90+2:17'). The Norwegian's winning goal helped the team secure the Treble and cemented his own place in United folklore. Solskjær finished the season with 12 league goals in 19 games (9 starts).

==== 1999–2000 season ====
Solskjær scored his first goal of the 1999–2000 season on 11 August 1999, netting in the 84th minute in a 4–0 win over Sheffield Wednesday. On 2 November, he scored a sublime volley during a 2–1 victory against Austrian team Sturm Graz in the UEFA Champions League. Solskjær won the Intercontinental Cup on 30 November, as Manchester United beat Brazilian team Palmeiras 1–0 at the National Stadium in Tokyo, Japan. On 4 December, he put four goals past Everton in a 5–1 victory at Old Trafford, the second of which was Solskjær's 50th goal for the club in all competitions. Solskjær equalised for United against Liverpool in a 1–1 draw on 4 March 2000. Three days later, he came off the bench in the 83rd minute against Bordeaux, scoring a minute later from goalkeeper Raimond van der Gouw's long ball. Manchester United won the Premier League on 1 April after thrashing West Ham 7–1, with Solskjær getting the seventh in the 73rd minute. On 15 April, he scored a brace during a 4–0 victory over Sunderland, netting in the 2nd and 51st minutes. Four days later, Solskjær featured in the second leg of United's UEFA Champions League quarter-final against Real Madrid, but failed to score as United were knocked out 3–2 on aggregate. On 24 April, he equalised against Chelsea bringing the score to 2–2, with United going on to win 3–2. He ended the campaign with 12 league goals in 28 appearances (15 starts).

==== 2000–01 season ====
Solskjær's opportunities were limited at the start of the 2000–01 season, however he scored on his second start of the season on 16 September 2000 as United beat Everton 3–1. On 31 October, he netted a brace during a 3–0 victory against Watford in the League Cup third round, scoring in the 12th and 81st minutes. He scored another brace on 23 December, against Ipswich Town in a 2–0 victory. Three days later, Solskjær helped United snatch a 1–0 win against Aston Villa, with the Norwegian heading in a David Beckham cross in the 85th minute. Solskjær scored the first goal of United's 2–1 FA Cup third round win over Fulham on 7 January 2001. On 25 February, he netted Manchester United's fifth goal against Arsenal (their closest title rivals) in United's 6–1 demolition, which sent them 16 points clear at the top of the table. On 10 April, he scored the winning goal in United's 2–1 victory over Charlton Athletic, scoring only six minutes after coming on in the 76th minute. Manchester United wrapped up the Premier League title in April – their third consecutive title, and Solskjær's fourth. That season Solskjær scored 10 league goals in 31 appearances (19 starts).

==== 2001–02 season ====
After a few years of coming on as the super-sub, Solskjær got a chance as a starter in the 2001–02 season, paired up with Dutch striker Ruud van Nistelrooy. He took the opportunity with characteristic incisiveness, forcing Andy Cole and Dwight Yorke onto the bench. He scored his first goals of the season on 22 September 2001, in a 4–0 victory over Ipswich Town, with Solskjær netting two – the second from a difficult angle. On 23 October, Solskjær came off the bench in the 73rd minute against Olympiacos, with the score level at 0–0, and within six minutes broke the deadlock – helping United eventually win 3–0. Four days later, he came off the bench while United were 1–0 down against Leeds United, and snatched an equaliser in the 89th minute – heading in a Ryan Giggs' cross. On 12 December, he scored a brace and provided two assists in United's 5–0 victory over Derby County, netting in the 6th and 58th minutes while setting up Roy Keane and Paul Scholes. Solskjær started the comeback against Aston Villa in the FA Cup third round on 6 January 2002, scoring in the 77th minute, as well as providing the assist for van Nistelrooy's second goal as United won 3–2.

On 29 January, he scored a hat-trick against Bolton Wanderers in Manchester United's 4–0 win. Solskjær netted a brace against Charlton Athletic in United's 2–0 win on 10 February, scoring in the 33rd and 74th minutes. On 26 February, Solskjær's 29th birthday, he scored his fourth brace of the season against French team Nantes as United won 5–1. He scored yet another brace on 30 March, putting two past Leeds United as "the Red Devils" won 4–3. Solskjær helped Manchester United advance to the UEFA Champions League semi-final after scoring two against Deportivo La Coruña in United's 3–2 victory on 10 April, the first only two minutes after coming on. He started against Arsenal at Old Trafford on 8 May, but failed to score as the Gunners beat United 1–0 and won the Premier League. Solskjær finished the season with 17 league goals in 30 appearances (23 starts), his best tally since his debut season at the club.

==== 2002–03 season ====
By the 2002–03 season, both Andy Cole and Dwight Yorke had left Old Trafford, leaving Solskjær, Diego Forlán and Van Nistelrooy to compete for a place in the starting line-up. Ferguson's persistence in playing Van Nistelrooy up front with Paul Scholes, or as a lone striker, meant that opportunities were limited. Solskjær scored Manchester United's first goal of the season on 17 August 2002, netting the winning goal (his 100th in all competitions) against West Bromwich Albion in the 78th minute. On 19 October, he earned a point for United in a 1–1 draw against Fulham, equalising in the 61st minute.

Solskjær was subsequently given his time again when David Beckham picked up an injury and Ferguson played the Norwegian on the right wing. While proving himself to be an able crosser of the ball, Solskjær also continued to contribute with goals, scoring a total of 16 goals in the season. He was selected to play on the right in important matches, such as in the league game against Arsenal and the Champions League quarter-final against Real Madrid, while Beckham was left on the bench. He also captained the team in a number of matches.

==== 2003–06: Injury-plagued seasons ====
At the start of 2003–04, Solskjær found himself as United's first-choice right winger. However, a knee injury suffered against Panathinaikos on 16 September 2003 put Solskjær out of action until February 2004. Solskjær returned from the injury for the season run-in and was man of the match in the FA Cup semi-final victory over Arsenal. He also played in the 2004 FA Cup final, which the club won. Solskjær was forced to undergo intensive knee surgery in August 2004 and had to miss the 2004–05 season entirely.

To show their continuing support, United fans added a banner to the collection that lines the Stretford End reading "20 LEGEND" (Solskjær wore number 20 for United). Solskjær further solidified his status amongst United fans when he became a patron of the supporters action group, Manchester United Supporters' Trust (MUST), previously Shareholders United.

==== 2006–07 season: Back from injury ====
Solskjær made his long-awaited return to action on 5 December 2005, playing for United's reserves against Liverpool. Spectators numbering 2,738 showed up to witness the comeback of the popular Norwegian – an above-average turn-out for a reserve team match. He made his first-team return as a substitute in the match against Birmingham City on 28 December. He then finally made his first start in January 2006 in an FA Cup match against Burton Albion, before playing a full game as a captain in the third round replay. His return to full fitness slowly continued with regular appearances in the reserves, until on 8 March 2006 when, during a game against Middlesbrough, he was accidentally caught by Ugo Ehiogu, breaking his cheekbone. While facing the possibility of missing the rest of the season, he nevertheless appeared as a substitute against Sunderland on Good Friday. Solskjær had a successful pre-season tour in the summer of 2006 gaining Ferguson's praise who also said he would reconsider his plan to buy a new striker.

He returned to Premier League action on 23 August 2006 when he scored in an away match against Charlton Athletic, his first Premier League goal since April 2003. Ferguson commented after the match that "it was a great moment for Ole, United fans everywhere, the players and the staff" and that "Ole has been through a torrid time with injuries for the last two years, but he's persevered and never lost faith and has got his repayment tonight. Everyone is over the moon for him." He continued his come-back by putting in the winning goal in the Champions League group match against Celtic at home on 13 September, fulfilling his post-injury ambition to score another goal at Old Trafford. Solskjær's first Premier League goals at Old Trafford since his return came on 1 October when he scored both goals in the 2–0 win against Newcastle United. His goalscoring form continued when he started in the away match against Wigan Athletic and struck a sublime finish to round off a 3–1 victory, and again against Crewe Alexandra on 25 October 2006, scoring the first goal in a 2–1 away victory in the third round of the League Cup. After a further injury sustained in Copenhagen in the UEFA Champions League, Solskjær recovered and again returned to form scoring the third goal in a 3–1 home win over Wigan on Boxing Day. Solskjær continued his form by scoring United's opening goal in their 3–2 home win over Reading on 30 December. Additionally, he came on as a substitute to score an injury-time winner in the 2–1 victory over Aston Villa at home in the FA Cup third round on 7 January 2007.

After scoring in the away FA Cup fifth round replay match against Reading on 27 February, Solskjær had further surgery on his knee. However, it was not as serious as his previous operations, and he was out of action for only a month. He was predicted to be available for the home game against Blackburn Rovers on 31 March. United manager Ferguson said: "It was good timing with the international break coming up. It gave us the opportunity to get the thing done." Solskjær did make his comeback against Blackburn Rovers as a late substitute, and even scored in the 89th minute to seal Manchester United's 4–1 win. His last match was the 2007 FA Cup final against Chelsea, but he had to settle for an FA Cup runners-up medal, as an extra-time goal from Didier Drogba gave Chelsea the victory.

On 5 June 2007, it was announced that Solskjær had undergone minor surgery after he reported discomfort in his knee while training with Norway. The surgery was a success, but he failed to fully recover, and announced his retirement from professional football on 27 August 2007. On 4 September, at a home game against Sunderland, Solskjær walked onto the pitch to say goodbye to the fans and received a standing ovation. As of his retirement, Solskjær held the record for the most goals scored for Manchester United as a substitute, scoring 28 goals off the bench, as well as the most Premier League goals as a substitute with 17, a mark which has since been passed by Jermain Defoe.

==== 2008: Testimonial ====
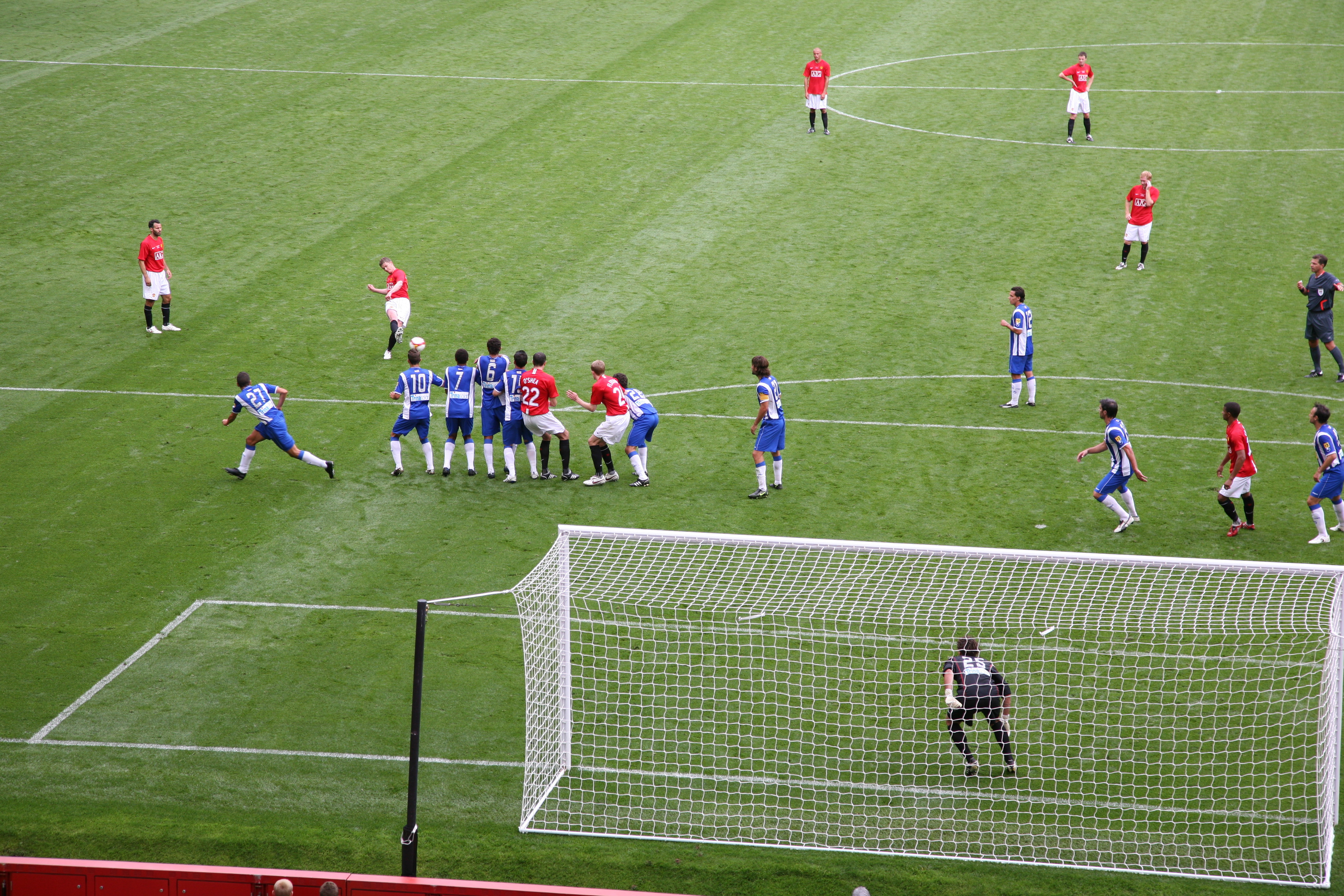
Solskjær taking a free kick during his testimonial in 2008

On 2 August 2008, a testimonial match was played in honour of Solskjær at Old Trafford against Espanyol. Almost 69,000 fans were present, setting a record as the second-highest-attended testimonial in British history. United eventually got the winner from substitute Fraizer Campbell. Solskjær appeared in the 68th minute, replacing Carlos Tevez.

==== Super sub role ====
At Manchester United, Solskjær earned wide acclaim for a habit of coming into matches late on as a substitute and scoring goals. Ferguson remarked that Solskjær had a knack of sitting on the bench and studying the game without taking his eye off the action. Reflecting on this aspect of his career years later, Solskjær said: "I had to think about myself, how can I do the most damage for the opposition if I come on? I sat there and I studied football games but I didn't exactly analyse their strikers. [...] Instead I would pay attention to what the defenders and full-backs were doing wrong."

== International career ==
Solskjær made his international debut in a friendly match against Jamaica on 26 November 1995, just a few months before he joined Manchester United. The game finished in a 1–1 draw with Solskjær scoring the only goal for Norway. He continued his great goal scoring start by scoring three goals in his first competitive appearances for the national team during the 1998 World Cup qualifying campaign.

Solskjær played in both the 1998 FIFA World Cup and UEFA Euro 2000 for Norway. He formed a feared partnership with Tore André Flo which was seen as one of the best striking partnerships in Norway's history.

Following his lengthy layout to injuries Solskjær made his full game comeback on 2 September 2006, when he scored the first and last goals in a 4–1 win against Hungary in a Euro 2008 qualifying match. They would be his last goals for the national team taking his tally up to 23 goals.

On 7 February 2007, Solskjær made what proved to be his final appearance for Norway in a 2–1 defeat against Croatia, he finished with a total of 67 appearances for his country.

== Style of play and reception ==
Solskjær was nicknamed "the Baby-faced Assassin" in the British media throughout his career, due to his youthful looks and his clinical finishing. He also earned a reputation as a "super-sub" in the press due to his penchant for scoring goals after coming off the bench. Although he was primarily deployed as a striker throughout his career, he was also capable of playing as a wide midfielder on either flank.

== Managerial career ==
=== First step into coaching ===
Solskjær signed his last player contract with Manchester United on 31 March 2006, with a provision to allow him to develop his coaching credentials. He also acted in an ambassadorial role for the club, when he travelled to Hong Kong in 2006 and played with students at the Manchester United Soccer School there. When interviewed by Setanta Sports in August 2007, Solskjær confirmed he would train to be a coach after retiring from professional football, and would start to earn the required badges after his last season with Manchester United. Following his retirement, Solskjær worked for Ferguson at Old Trafford, coaching the strikers on the first team for the remainder of the 2007–08 season.

As announced on 20 May 2008, he took over the Manchester United Reserves during that summer. Solskjær was United's first full-time reserve team manager since 2006, taking over from Brian McClair and Jimmy Ryan, who had filled the role in a caretaker capacity. He won the 2007–08 Lancashire Senior Cup by defeating the Liverpool Reserves 3–2 in the final. On 12 May 2009, Solskjær won his first Manchester Senior Cup by defeating Bolton Wanderers 1–0 at the Reebok Stadium.

Shortly after the resignation of Åge Hareide as coach for the Norwegian national team, Solskjær was offered the position but he declined, saying that it was not yet the right time for him. Solskjær's final game as Manchester United Reserves manager was a 5–1 victory over Newcastle United on 16 December 2010.

=== Molde ===
On 9 November 2010, Solskjær signed a four-year contract with the Norwegian club Molde to take over as manager, where he played prior to moving to Manchester United. Solskjær continued as Manchester United Reserves manager until January 2011, when he took over at Molde for the start of the new season. On 18 March 2011, Molde played their first league game under Solskjær and suffered an embarrassing 3–0 defeat to newly promoted Sarpsborg 08. They played their first home game of the season on 3 April, where despite coming from 1–0 down to lead 2–1 they were held to a 2–2 draw by league leaders Tromsø. Molde's first goal under Solskjær was scored in this game, by Senegalese striker Pape Paté Diouf. On 17 April 2011, Solskjær won his first Tippeligaen game at Molde with the 3–2 home win over Stabæk. On Molde's 100-year anniversary on 19 June 2011, Solskjær led the team to a 2–0 victory over Sogndal and the top of the Tippeligaen. On 30 October 2011, Solskjær won the Tippeligaen with Molde in his first year as manager for the team. On 18 May 2012, Molde gave Aston Villa permission to discuss their vacant managerial role with Solskjær, following the sacking of Alex McLeish. However, Solskjær decided to remain with Molde to avoid disrupting his family after they had settled back in Norway. On 11 November 2012, Solskjær's team, Molde, won the Tippeligaen for the second consecutive year after they beat Hønefoss 1–0, whilst their closest title challengers, Strømsgodset lost 2–1 away to Sandnes Ulf. In 2013, Molde suffered a tough season opening with only 7 points in the first 11 matches. Under the guidance of Solskjær, Molde managed to recover and at the end of the season the team finished in sixth place with 44 points in 30 matches. On 24 November 2013, Molde beat Rosenborg 4–2 in the 2013 Norwegian Football Cup final to win the Norwegian Football Cup for the third time in the club's history, thus securing a place in the 2014–15 Europa League qualifiers.

=== Cardiff City ===
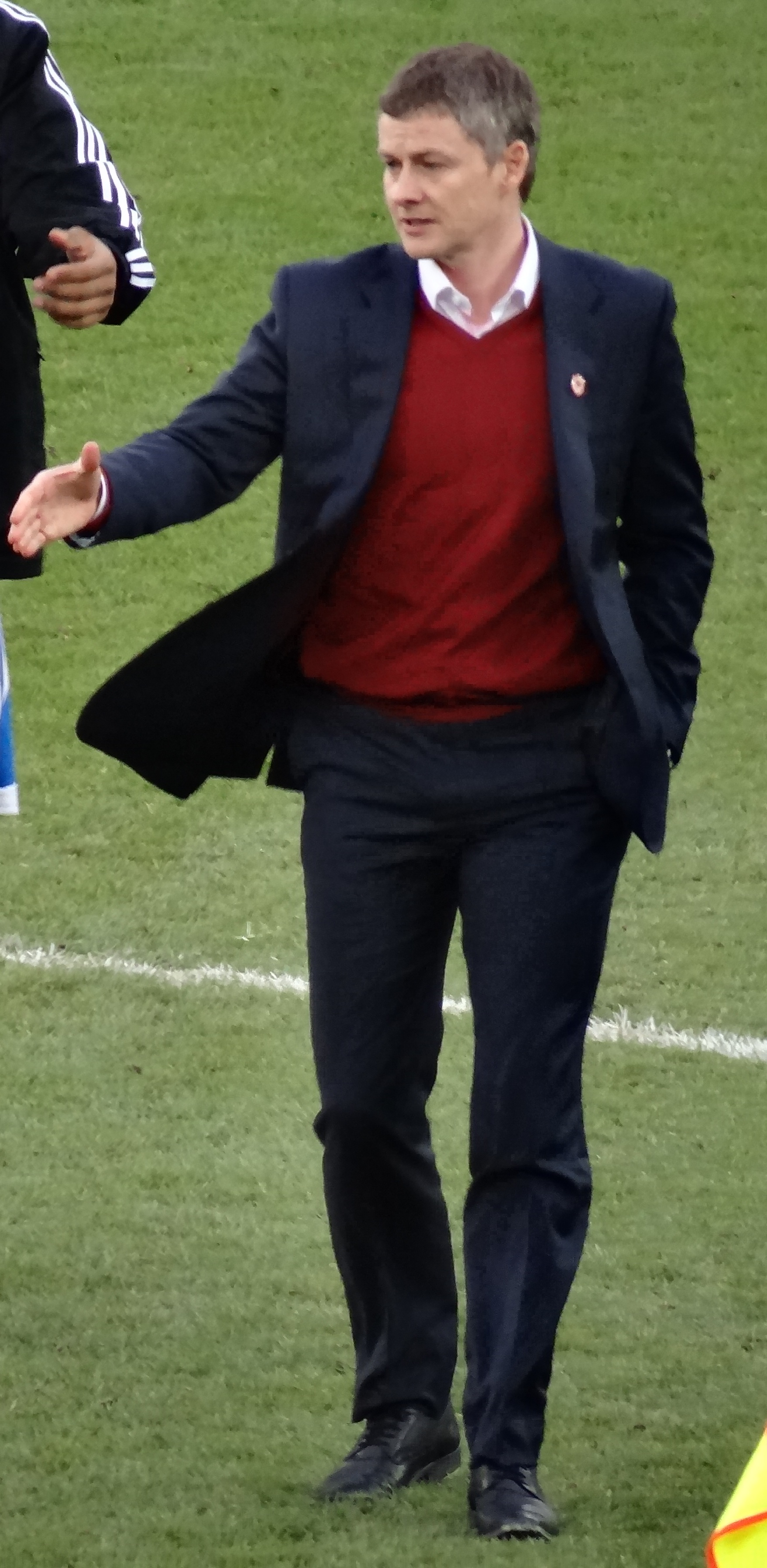
Solskjær as Cardiff City manager in 2014

On 2 January 2014, Solskjær was announced as manager of Cardiff City. The club won its first game with Solskjær in charge, coming from behind to beat Newcastle United 2–1 in the third round of the FA Cup, two days after his appointment. Cardiff then struggled for points and after defeats against Swansea City, Hull City, Crystal Palace and Sunderland, were relegated back to the Championship following a 3–0 away defeat to Newcastle. At the end of the season, Cardiff finished 20th, collecting only 7 wins and 30 points. He departed on 18 September 2014 following Cardiff City's poor run of form at the start of the Championship campaign.

=== Return to Molde ===
On 21 October 2015, Solskjær returned to Molde, signing a three-and-a-half-year contract to become their new manager. His first match back in charge was the next day, with Molde defeating Celtic 3–1 at home in the Europa League group stage. His first game in the league was a 2–1 away win against Aalesunds on 25 October. He won the next, and final, two games of the 2015 Tippeligaen against Viking and Start, with Molde finishing in sixth. Meanwhile, in the Europa League group stage, Solskjær guided Molde to first place, ahead of Fenerbahçe, Ajax and Celtic. On 14 December, Molde was drawn against the title holders and eventual champions Sevilla in the Round of 32. Molde lost the away leg 3–0 on 18 February 2016 but won the home leg 1–0 on 25 February, getting knocked-out 3–1 on aggregate.

The 2016 Tippeligaen started fairly well for Solskjær with Molde winning seven, drawing three and losing two games in the first 12 matches with Molde sitting in second place. However a bad stretch of form followed with Molde failing to win their next six games, losing five of them – including a 3–1 defeat to league leaders Rosenborg on 28 May 2016. Molde then won the next four games, including a 4–2 victory over Odd on 21 August with two goals coming in stoppage time from substitutes Tobias Svendsen and Harmeet Singh. In Solskjær's first full season back as manager, Molde finished fifth in the league after losing on the final day of the season 1–0 to Lillestrøm.

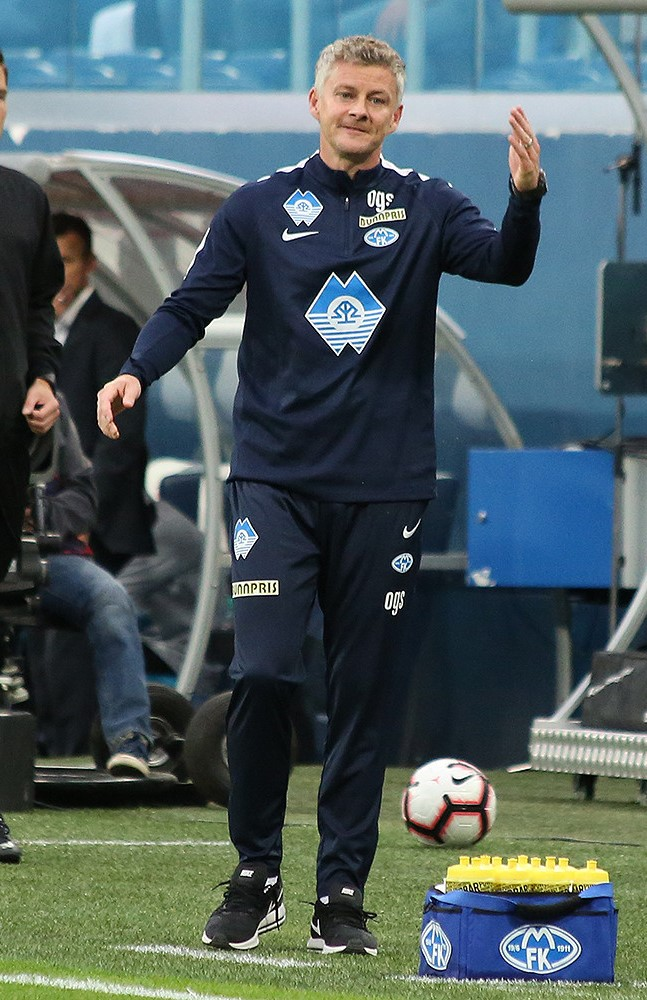
Solskjær in his second spell as Molde manager in 2018

Molde's initial form under Solskjær in the 2017 Eliteserien was mixed with the club winning their first two matches – including a stoppage time winner against Lillestrøm on 5 April 2017 – but after that they only won one of their next seven games leaving Molde in tenth. Form improved however with Molde only losing just once in the next nine games, winning six including two 3–0 victories against Tromsø and Aalesund, bringing the club up to third place. After losing the next two matches, Molde went unbeaten for the next seven games, winning six with two last minute victories against Odd and Vålerenga – seeing Molde go second. Solskjær reached the semi-final of the Norwegian Football Cup on 17 August after a 2–1 victory over Kristiansund. The match took place on 21 September with Molde losing 3–0 to Lillestrøm, who went on to win the Cup. Solskjær helped Molde finish second in his third season, seven points behind winners Rosenborg, seeing the club qualify for the first qualification round of the Europa League.

The 2018 Eliteserien was Molde's best year under Solskjær since his return, starting the season with three wins against Sandefjord, Haugesund and Tromsø sending Molde top. After a 4–0 defeat against Rosenborg on 8 April 2018, Molde's form began to vary with the club getting only three wins in the next eight matches leaving the club in eighth. However Solskjær oversaw Molde go undefeated over the next five games including: a 4–0 away win over Brann on 1 July; a 5–1 victory against Vålerenga on 8 July; and a 5–1 win against Brann on 12 August. On 11 July, Molde played away against Northern Irish side Glenavon in the first qualifying round of the Europa League, losing 2–1. Molde won the return leg 5–1 on 19 July, sending them through to the next qualification round. Molde were then drawn against Albanian team Laçi, beating them 5–0 on aggregate. For the third qualifying round, Molde faced Hibernian over who Solskjær led his team to a 3–0 win on aggregate. Molde were drawn against Russian side Zenit St. Petersburg on 6 August, who they faced on 23 August with Molde losing 3–1 away. Solskjær's Molde won the return leg on 30 August 2–1 but it was not enough as Molde were knocked out 4–3 on aggregate. After suffering defeats in the league to Stabæk and Ranheim at the end of August, Solskjær led his side undefeated for the rest of the season – winning eight out of ten. His best win in this run was against title challengers Rosenborg on 30 September, who Solskjær beat 1–0. Despite this it was not enough as Molde finished the league in second place, five points behind winners Rosenborg. On 3 December 2018, Molde announced that Solskjær extended his contract till the end of the 2021 season.

=== Manchester United ===
==== 2018–19 season: Caretaker period and permanent appointment ====
Manchester United appointed Solskjær as caretaker manager on 19 December 2018, taking over from José Mourinho for the rest of the 2018–19 season. He was scheduled to return to Molde in May 2019, with his assistant coach Erling Moe acting as caretaker manager during Solskjær's absence in the pre-season and the first matches of the 2019 Eliteserien, which was scheduled to start on 31 March 2019. Solskjær later suggested that he would need to sign a new contract with Molde if he were to return, but this was refuted by Molde director Øystein Neerland, who expected Solskjær to return to Molde at the end of the English season.

Solskjær's first match was against his former club, Cardiff City, on 22 December 2018, with United finishing as 5–1 winners. This was the first time United had scored five or more goals in a Premier League game since a 5–5 draw with West Bromwich Albion in Ferguson's final game in charge before his retirement in May 2013. Victories in his next four league games made Solskjær the first Manchester United manager to win his first five league games in charge since Sir Matt Busby in 1946. The league winning streak was ended at six (eight in all competitions, including FA Cup wins over Reading at home and away at Arsenal) after United played out a 2–2 draw at home to Burnley on 29 January. Solskjær's successful first full month as Manchester United manager resulted in him being named as the Premier League Manager of the Month for January 2019, during which time his team earned 10 points from a possible 12 in the league, making him the first Manchester United manager to win the award since Ferguson in October 2012 and the first Norwegian to be named either Player or Manager of the Month. Two consecutive away wins in the league against Leicester City and Fulham gave United six consecutive away victories in all competitions for the first time since May 2009, and sent them into the top four of the league table. Having picked up 25 points since taking over, Solskjær earned more points than any other manager has managed in his first nine games in charge of a single club in the Premier League. A 3–1 win at Crystal Palace on 28 February 2019 set a club record of eight consecutive away victories in all competitions.

The Champions League saw Solskjær suffer his first loss as manager, as United were beaten 2–0 at home to Paris Saint-Germain in the first leg of their round of 16 tie on 12 February. In the second leg at the Parc des Princes on 6 March, a Marcus Rashford penalty in the 94th minute gave Manchester United a 3–1 win, sending them through to the quarter-finals on away goals and making them the first team in the history of the European Cup to advance after losing the first leg at home by two goals or more. On 10 March, United lost 2–0 to Arsenal, their first Premier League defeat under Solskjær, dropping out of the league's top four. On 16 March, United were knocked out of the FA Cup by Wolverhampton Wanderers in a 2–1 quarter-final defeat, with Solskjær commenting that this was United's worst performance yet under his management.

On 28 March 2019, having won 14 of his 19 matches in charge, Solskjær signed a three-year contract to take over as Manchester United manager on a permanent basis. After Solskjær gained this permanent role, United won only 2 of 10 matches for the rest of the season. This included defeats in both legs of the Champions League quarter-final against Barcelona in April 2019, going down 4–0 on aggregate, in which Solskjær admitted Barcelona were a "couple of levels above" United; a 4–0 league defeat away to Everton, also in April 2019; and in United's final game of the season in May 2019, they lost 2–0 at home to already-relegated Cardiff, Solskjær's former club.

United finished the Premier League season in sixth place, the same position they were when Solskjær joined as caretaker manager. United finished five points behind the fourth placed team, and 32 points behind the first placed team that season. Solskjær declared in late May 2019 that United had "a big job preparing for next season with player logistics and training logistics", but the club would be "ready" when the next season started, and there were "not going to be any excuses".

==== 2019–20 season: Improved league form and Cup Semi-Finals ====
Under Solskjær, United started the 2019–20 season with 10 points from their first nine games, their worst start to a league campaign in 33 years (since the 1986–87 season). By January 2020, they lost 2–0 to Burnley at Old Trafford, leaving United with a league record of 34 points from 24 games, which was worse than the previous season's tally at that point. In that match, United's players were booed by their own fans; vitriolic chants were directed at the Glazers, United's owners, and vice-chairman Ed Woodward by fans; and thousands left Old Trafford before the final whistle. Former United player Darren Fletcher commented that "the atmosphere [at Old Trafford] really turned toxic for the first time". Solskjær stated that the "players are giving everything", and called for fans to "stick together" to "help the club to move forward". Also that month, United were knocked out of the EFL Cup at the semi-final stage after losing 3–2 on aggregate over two legs to Manchester City.

After new United signing Bruno Fernandes made his debut, United went unbeaten for the rest of the Premier League season, with 32 points from 14 games since February 2020, more than any other club in that period. CNN described United as "a team lacking creativity, quality and leadership" producing "poor" football before Fernandes' arrival, but "signs of new life under Solskjaer" emerged by the end of the season, with Fernandes a key spark. United finished the season with 66 points in the Premier League, equal to the previous season's points tally, but now in third place instead of sixth. Solskjær declared that the third-place league finish was a "massive achievement", "with this team and this squad, and where we have been with this rebuild". With United finishing the league 33 points behind Liverpool and 15 behind Manchester City, Solskjær stated it would be a "massive challenge" to outdo these teams the next season.

Late in the season, United were knocked out of two more competitions at the semi-final stage. In the FA Cup, United suffered a 3–1 loss to Chelsea; Solskjær dropped usual FA Cup goalkeeper Sergio Romero in favour of David de Gea, but the latter made two errors leading to two Chelsea goals. In the Europa League, the last game of United's season saw United succumbing to a 2–1 loss to Sevilla. Solskjær did not make any substitutions until the 87th minute of the game, and again dropped usual Europa League goalkeeper Romero in favour of de Gea. Solskjær had said before this game that "semi-finals are not good enough for Manchester United"; after the game Solskjær reacted: "when you don't take the chances it's going to be hard", United's players had "tired legs and tired minds", and that United "definitely need to improve".

==== 2020–21 season: 2nd in the league and Europa League Final ====
Under Solskjær, United had a slow start to the 2020–21 Premier League season, starting the campaign with a 3–1 loss to Crystal Palace at home and scoring seven points from their first six league games, placing them 15th in the league table. This included a 6–1 home loss to Tottenham Hotspur in October, United's joint heaviest defeat in the Premier League, that saw Solskjær stating it was the worst day of his managerial career; as well as a 1–0 home loss to Arsenal in November, which was Solskjær's 100th match in charge of United, where Solskjær reacted by saying that United's players "didn't turn up".

Meanwhile, in the Champions League, United were knocked out in the group stage when they finished third in their group, with one win and one loss against each of their opponents, Paris Saint-Germain, RB Leipzig and İstanbul Başakşehir. This result sent United into the Europa League.

Back in the Premier League, after eight wins in 10 Premier League games, United travelled to Burnley on 12 January 2021 and won 1–0. This put United at the top of the league table after 17 league games, which was the first occasion this happened since the 2012–13 title-winning season under Sir Alex Ferguson. The Guardian commented that United exemplified "unerring determination" in this game, which was "a theme of United's season" so far. However, United were soon caught by Manchester City, and with a 2–1 home loss to bottom-of-the-table Sheffield United on 27 January 2021, failed to regain the top spot. While BBC Sport described United as "desperately poor", Solskjær suggested that United were unlucky since United had been the "most consistent team" that season, and stating that there "will be no big inquest" into the loss.

Since the Sheffield United loss, United went on a 14-match unbeaten run in the league. On 2 February, Solskjær oversaw United scoring a record equalling nine goals in a 9–0 victory over Southampton as the latter team received two red cards. It was the third time such a feat had been achieved in the Premier League, with Manchester United being first to do so against Ipswich in 1995. On 9 May, United came from behind to nail a 3–1 away win against Aston Villa, thus confirming a top-four finish to the season and Champions League qualification. With this victory, United set a record of winning 10 league matches that they conceded first in within a season. On 11 May, United's unbeaten run was ended by Leicester City with a 2–1 loss at Old Trafford, after Solskjær drastically changed his starting line-up due to fixture congestion after United were scheduled to face Villa, Leicester and Liverpool in the space of five days between 9 May 2021 and 13 May 2021 after United's fixture with Liverpool was postponed due to 2021 Old Trafford protests. This result handed Manchester City the Premier League as United could no longer mathematically catch them.

Manchester United finished runners-up in the Premier League with 74 points, 12 points behind champions Manchester City, and qualified for the Champions League group stage. This was United's first back-to-back top-four finish since Sir Alex Ferguson's retirement.

In the EFL Cup, United were eliminated in the semi-final in January 2021 by Manchester City with a 2–0 home loss. In the FA Cup, despite knocking out Liverpool in the fourth round in a 3–2 win at Old Trafford in January 2021, United were later knocked out by the eventual winners Leicester City in the quarter-final in March 2021 with a 3–1 away loss.

In the Europa League, United eliminated Milan in the round of 16 with an aggregate win of 2–1 over two legs in March 2021, then later eliminated Roma in the semi-finals with an aggregate win of 8–5 over two legs. In the Europa League final on 26 May, United lost 11–10 on penalties to Villarreal after a 1–1 draw. Solskjær was criticised by some fans for his decision to make his first substitution 10 minutes into extra time.

==== 2021–22 season: Dip in performances and departure ====
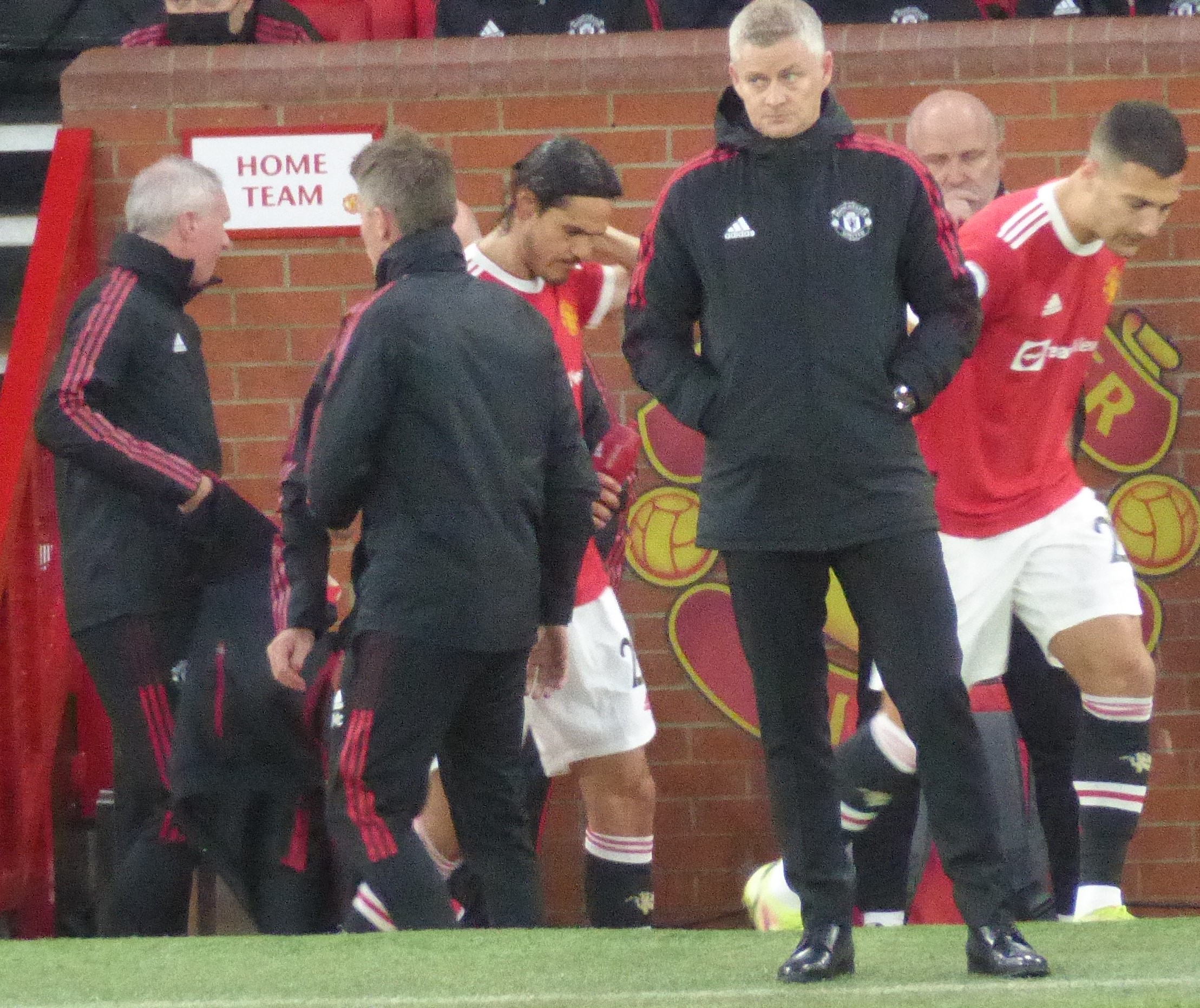
Solskjær on the Old Trafford touchline in 2021

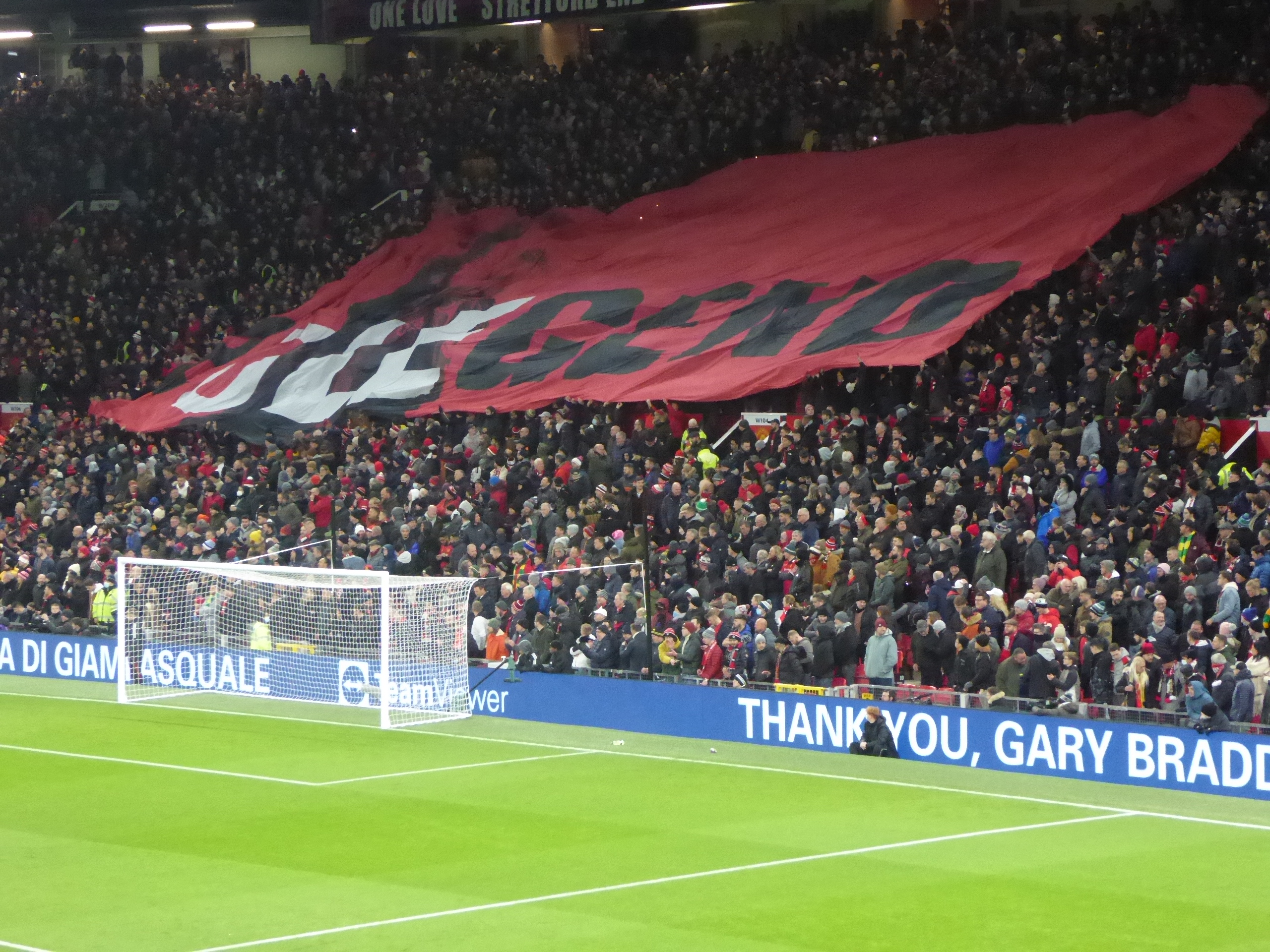
The "20LEGEND" banner being raised in the Stretford End before United's game against Arsenal, the first home game following Solskjær's departure from the club

On 24 July 2021, Manchester United announced that Solskjær had signed a three-year contract extension until 2024, with an option for a further year, till 2025. United kicked off their 2021–22 UEFA Champions League campaign on 14 September 2021 with a 2–1 loss to Swiss club Young Boys. Cristiano Ronaldo scored early on; however, United would be down a man after Wan-Bissaka got sent off, allowing Young Boys to come back to win the game 2–1 with a late goal. In the Premier League, United started off strong with a 5–1 win at home vs Leeds with Bruno Fernandes scoring a hattrick and Paul Pogba registering four assists in that game. United would go on to get 13 points in their opening five games. Under Solskjær, on 19 September, Ronaldo and Jesse Lingard scored goals in Manchester United's 2–1 win over West Ham United at the London Stadium to set a new record for being unbeaten in 29 away games in the Premier League.

A run of poor results started on 25 September with a 1–0 loss at home to Aston Villa. This preceded a one all draw at home vs Everton and a 4–2 loss at Leicester that ended their unbeaten away run. On 24 October, Solskjær oversaw a 5–0 home loss to arch-rivals Liverpool; United's worst result against Liverpool since 1925. On 6 November, they lost 2–0 in the Manchester derby against rivals Manchester City. On 20 November, after losing 4–1 to Watford and conceding 15 goals in their last five league fixtures, it was reported the club's board of directors held an emergency meeting and decided to sack and part ways with Solskjær and label the departure of Solskjær as mutual consent. On 21 November, Manchester United confirmed that Solskjær had left his role as manager. At the time of his departure, Manchester United were seventh in the Premier League table with 17 points after 12 games and United had only one win in the last seven games Solskjær managed. First-team coach and former player Michael Carrick took over as caretaker until Ralf Rangnick's appointment in December as interim manager until the end of the season. Erik ten Hag took over as permanent manager ahead of the 2022–23 season.

=== Beşiktaş ===
Solskjær was appointed head coach of Süper Lig club Beşiktaş on 18 January 2025 on a one-and-a-half-year contract. Solskjær's first six months with Beşiktaş proved to be positive, as he guided the team to eight wins and one draw in his first 12 games, culminating in a victory in the Beşiktaş-Galatasaray derby on 29 March 2025, when his side secured a 2–1 win over then-undefeated Süper Lig leaders Galatasaray.

On 28 August 2025, Solskjær was sacked following his sides' defeat at home to Swiss side Lausanne-Sport in the UEFA Conference League play-off round, having already been knocked out of the UEFA Europa League by Shakhtar Donetsk during qualifying, leaving his club with no European football for the season.

== Other football roles ==
In September 2022, Solskjær began to help out on a voluntary basis with the coaching of his hometown club Kristiansund's under-14 team, for whom his son Elijah played at the time.

When out of senior management, Ole has worked as a technical observer for UEFA since 2023. In this role, he uses footage from various angles to analyse football matches from a coaching perspective, providing tactical insights and writing detailed reports for UEFA's official channels.

Solskjær explained his role at UEFA ahead of the 2025-26 Champions League season, saying: "My role entails travelling to matches and analysing the technical quality and tactical approach closely, as well as picking a Player of the Match. It's a really great way of watching the top teams closely and keeping up with trends. I also get to meet new and old football acquaintances in a more relaxed setting."

== Personal life ==
During his time as a player for Manchester United, Solskjær lived in Bramhall, Stockport, with his wife, Silje, and their three children, Noah, Karna and Elijah. Two of the children are footballers: Noah plays as a midfielder, while Karna plays as a forward for AaFK Fortuna and is a product of the Manchester United academy. She made one senior appearance for United, debuting in the 2021–22 Women's FA Cup against Bridgwater United, in doing so she and Ole became the first father-daughter pair to play for Manchester United. Solskjær was appointed a UNICEF Goodwill Ambassador in 2001.

On 24 October 2008, Solskjær was awarded the First Class Knighthood of the Royal Norwegian Order of St. Olav by King Harald V of Norway. He was presented with the award in a ceremony the next day in his hometown of Kristiansund. Solskjær is the youngest-ever recipient of the knighthood, usually bestowed upon notable members of society in their later years.

In 2009, the Norwegian parliament awarded Solskjær its annual Peer Gynt Prize for his work as worthy ambassador of sport and for his "great social commitment", in a ceremony at Vinstra Hall. The ex-footballer laughingly admitted in the subsequent press conference that he had neither read nor seen the Ibsen play, yet, but now intends to.

Politically, he supports the Norwegian Labour Party and visited their congress in 2011. In a speech delivered there, he publicly pronounced his left-wing political sympathies.

== Career statistics ==
=== Club ===
Appearances and goals by club, season and competition
Club	Season	League			National cup (Note: Includes Norwegian Football Cup and FA Cup)		League cup (Note: Includes League Cup)		Europe		Other		Total	
Club	Season	Division	Apps	Goals	Apps	Goals	Apps	Goals	Apps	Goals	Apps	Goals	Apps	Goals
Clausenengen	1990	Norwegian Third Division Group E					—		—		—			
Clausenengen	1991	Norwegian Third Division Group M					—		—		—			
Clausenengen	1992	Norwegian Third Division Group M					—		—		—			
Clausenengen	1993	Norwegian Third Division Group M					—		—		—			
Clausenengen	1994	Norwegian Second Division Group 5					—		—		—			
Clausenengen	Total		109	115			—		—		—		109	115
Molde	1995	Tippeligaen	26	20	4	6	—		4 (Note: Appearances in UEFA Cup Winners' Cup)	3	—		34	29
Molde	1996	Tippeligaen	16	11	4	1	—		—		—		20	12
Molde	Total		42	31	8	7	—		4	3	—		54	41
Manchester United	1996–97	Premier League	33	18	3	0	0	0	10 (Note: Appearances in UEFA Champions League)	1	0	0	46	19
Manchester United	1997–98	Premier League	22	6	2	2	0	0	6	1	0	0	30	9
Manchester United	1998–99	Premier League	19	12	8	1	3	3	6	2	1 (Note: Appearance in FA Charity Shield)	0	37	18
Manchester United	1999–2000	Premier League	28	12	—		1	0	11	3	6 (Note: One appearance in FA Charity Shield, one appearance in UEFA Super Cup, one appearance in Intercontinental Cup and three appearances in FIFA Club World Championship)	0	46	15
Manchester United	2000–01	Premier League	31	10	2	1	2	2	11	0	1	0	47	13
Manchester United	2001–02	Premier League	30	17	2	1	0	0	15	7	0	0	47	25
Manchester United	2002–03	Premier League	37	9	2	1	4	1	14	4	—		57	15
Manchester United	2003–04	Premier League	13	0	3	0	0	0	2	1	1 (Note: Appearance in FA Community Shield)	0	19	1
Manchester United	2004–05	Premier League	0	0	0	0	0	0	0	0	0	0	0	0
Manchester United	2005–06	Premier League	3	0	2	0	0	0	0	0	—		5	0
Manchester United	2006–07	Premier League	19	7	6	2	1	1	6	1	—		32	11
Manchester United	Total		235	91	30	8	11	7	81	20	9	0	366	126
Career total			386	237	38	15	11	7	85	23	9	0	529	282

=== International ===
Appearances and goals by national team and year
National team	Year	Apps	Goals
Norway	1995	2	1
Norway	1996	6	3
Norway	1997	2	1
Norway	1998	9	3
Norway	1999	8	5
Norway	2000	10	1
Norway	2001	7	3
Norway	2002	9	2
Norway	2003	7	2
Norway	2004	2	0
Norway	2005	0	0
Norway	2006	4	2
Norway	2007	1	0
Total		67	23

Scores and results list Norway's goal tally first, score column indicates score after each Solskjær goal.

List of international goals scored by Ole Gunnar Solskjær
No.	Date	Venue	Opponent	Score	Result	Competition
1	26 November 1995	Kingston, Jamaica	Jamaica	1–0	1–1	Friendly
2	27 March 1996	Windsor Park, Belfast, Northern Ireland	Northern Ireland	1–0	2–0	Friendly
3	2 June 1996	Ullevaal Stadion, Oslo, Norway	Azerbaijan	2–0	5–0	1998 FIFA World Cup qualification
4	2 June 1996	Ullevaal Stadion, Oslo, Norway	Azerbaijan	5–0	5–0	1998 FIFA World Cup qualification
5	30 April 1997	Ullevaal Stadion, Oslo, Norway	Finland	1–1	1–1	1998 FIFA World Cup qualification
6	25 March 1998	King Baudouin Stadium, Brussels, Belgium	Belgium	2–2	2–2	Friendly
7	27 May 1998	Molde Stadion, Molde, Norway	Saudi Arabia	2–0	6–0	Friendly
8	27 May 1998	Molde Stadion, Molde, Norway	Saudi Arabia	3–0	6–0	Friendly
9	27 March 1999	Olympic Stadium, Athens, Greece	Greece	1–0	2–0	UEFA Euro 2000 qualification
10	27 March 1999	Olympic Stadium, Athens, Greece	Greece	2–0	2–0	UEFA Euro 2000 qualification
11	28 April 1999	Boris Paichadze National Stadium, Tbilisi, Georgia	Georgia	3–0	4–1	UEFA Euro 2000 qualification
12	8 September 1999	Ullevaal Stadion, Oslo, Norway	Slovenia	3–0	4–0	UEFA Euro 2000 qualification
13	9 October 1999	Daugava Stadium, Riga, Latvia	Latvia	1–0	2–1	UEFA Euro 2000 qualification
14	27 May 2000	Ullevaal Stadion, Oslo, Norway	Slovakia	1–0	2–0	Friendly
15	24 March 2001	Ullevaal Stadion, Oslo, Norway	Poland	2–2	2–3	2002 FIFA World Cup qualification
16	28 March 2001	Dinamo Stadium, Minsk, Belarus	Belarus	1–1	1–2	2002 FIFA World Cup qualification
17	15 August 2001	Ullevaal Stadion, Oslo, Norway	Turkey	1–0	1–1	Friendly
18	14 May 2002	Ullevaal Stadion, Oslo, Norway	Japan	3–0	3–0	Friendly
19	22 May 2002	Aspmyra Stadion, Bodø, Norway	Iceland	1–1	1–1	Friendly
20	2 April 2003	Stade Josy Barthel, Luxembourg City, Luxembourg	Luxembourg	2–0	2–0	UEFA Euro 2004 qualification
21	11 June 2003	Ullevaal Stadion, Oslo, Norway	Romania	1–1	1–1	UEFA Euro 2004 qualification
22	2 September 2006	Szusza Ferenc Stadion, Budapest, Hungary	Hungary	1–0	4–1	UEFA Euro 2008 qualification
23	2 September 2006	Szusza Ferenc Stadion, Budapest, Hungary	Hungary	4–0	4–1	UEFA Euro 2008 qualification

== Managerial statistics ==
As of 28 August 2025

Managerial record by team and tenure
Team	From	To	Record					Ref.
Team	From	To	P	W	D	L	Win %	Ref.
Molde	9 November 2010	2 January 2014	126	69	27	30	54.8	
Cardiff City	2 January 2014	18 September 2014	30	9	5	16	30.0	
Molde	21 October 2015	19 December 2018	118	66	20	32	55.9	
Manchester United	19 December 2018	21 November 2021	168	91	37	40	54.2	
Beşiktaş	18 January 2025	28 August 2025	29	15	5	9	51.7	
Career total			471	250	94	127	53.08	

== Honours ==
=== Player ===
Clausenengen

- 3. divisjon: 1993

Manchester United

- Premier League: 1996–97, 1998–99, 1999–2000, 2000–01, 2002–03, 2006–07
- FA Cup: 1998–99, 2003–04
- FA Charity/Community Shield: 1996, 2003
- UEFA Champions League: 1998–99
- Intercontinental Cup: 1999
- Football League Cup runner-up: 2002–03

Individual

- Kniksen Awards Kniksen of the Year: 1996
- Kniksen's honour award: 2007

=== Manager ===
Manchester United Reserves

- Lancashire Senior Cup: 2007–08
- Manchester Senior Cup: 2008–09
- Premier Reserve League North: 2009–10
- Premier Reserve League: 2009–10

Molde

- Tippeligaen: 2011, 2012
- Norwegian Football Cup: 2013

Manchester United

- UEFA Europa League runner-up: 2020–21

Individual

- Kniksen Award Coach of the Year: 2011, 2012
- Peer Gynt Prize: 2009 (for his efforts for football and philanthropy)
- Premier League Manager of the Month: January 2019

Orders

- Knight of the Order of St. Olav, First Class, 2008
