= 1989 Norwegian Second Division =

2. divisjon
- Season: 1989
- Champions: Fyllingen; Strømsgodset
- Promoted: Fyllingen; Strømsgodset
- Relegated: Vard; Vidar; Clausenengen; Drøbak/Frogn; Harstad; Bodø/Glimt
- Matches played: 264
- Goals scored: 789 (2.99 per match)

The 1989 2. divisjon was a Norwegian second-tier football league season. The league was contested by 24 teams, divided into two groups; A and B. The winners of group A and B were promoted to the 1990 Tippeligaen.

The second placed teams met the 10th position finisher in the 1. divisjon in a qualification round where the winner was promoted to Tippeligaen. The bottom three teams inn both groups were relegated to the 3. divisjon.

== Overview ==
=== Summary ===
Fyllingen won group A with 43 points and Strømsgodset won group B with 45 points. Both teams promoted to the 1990 Tippeligaen. The second-placed teams, Djerv 1919 and HamKam met Vålerengen in the promotion play-offs. Vålerengen won the qualification and remained in the Tippeligaen.

== Tables ==
=== Group A ===
Pos	Team	Pld	W	D	L	GF	GA	GD	Pts	Promotion, qualification or relegation
1	Fyllingen (C, P)	22	13	4	5	43	20	+23	43	Promotion to Tippeligaen
2	Djerv 1919	22	12	5	5	42	25	+17	41	Qualification for the promotion play-offs
3	Bryne	22	11	7	4	42	21	+21	40	
4	Namsos	22	10	5	7	32	22	+10	35	
5	Fredrikstad	22	8	8	6	26	25	+1	32	
6	Stord	22	9	4	9	32	37	−5	31	
7	Aalesund	22	8	5	9	40	42	−2	29	
8	Strindheim	22	6	7	9	28	37	−9	25	
9	Råde	22	6	6	10	30	34	−4	24	
10	Vard (R)	22	5	8	9	28	38	−10	23	Relegation to Third Division
11	Vidar (R)	22	5	7	10	23	34	−11	22	Relegation to Third Division
12	Clausenengen (R)	22	5	2	15	18	49	−31	17	Relegation to Third Division

Source: rsssf.no
Rules for classification: 1) points; 2) goal difference; 3) number of goals scored.
(C) Champions; (P) Promoted; (R) Relegated

=== Group B ===
Pos	Team	Pld	W	D	L	GF	GA	GD	Pts	Promotion, qualification or relegation
1	Strømsgodset (C, P)	22	13	6	3	42	24	+18	45	Promotion to Tippeligaen
2	HamKam	22	12	6	4	48	23	+25	42	Qualification for the promotion play-offs
3	Mjøndalen	22	12	5	5	41	28	+13	41	
4	Frigg	22	10	5	7	38	31	+7	35	
5	Lyn	22	10	4	8	33	27	+6	34	
6	Faaberg	22	9	5	8	34	29	+5	32	
7	Strømmen	22	7	6	9	35	29	+6	27	
8	Pors	22	6	8	8	27	36	−9	26	
9	Eik	22	7	4	11	26	33	−7	25	
10	Drøbak/Frogn (R)	22	6	6	10	34	35	−1	24	Relegation to Third Division
11	Harstad (R)	22	4	5	13	22	59	−37	17	Relegation to Third Division
12	Bodø/Glimt (R)	22	2	8	12	25	51	−26	14	Relegation to Third Division

Source: rsssf.no
Rules for classification: 1) points; 2) goal difference; 3) number of goals scored.
(C) Champions; (P) Promoted; (R) Relegated

== Promotion play-offs ==
=== Results ===
- 15 October 1989: Vålerengen – Djerv 1919 1–0
- 18 October 1989: Djerv 1919 – HamKam 2–0
- 21 October 1989: HamKam – Vålerengen 2–2

Vålerengen won the qualification round and remained in the Tippeligaen.

=== Play-off table ===
Pos	Team	Pld	W	D	L	GF	GA	GD	Pts	Promotion or relegation
1	Vålerengen (O)	2	1	1	0	3	2	+1	3	Remained in the Tippeligaen
2	Djerv 1919	2	1	0	1	2	1	+1	2	Remained in the Second Division
3	HamKam	2	0	1	1	2	4	−2	1	Remained in the Second Division

Source: rsssf.no
Rules for classification: 1) points; 2) goal difference; 3) number of goals scored.
(O) Play-off winners
