= Robin Berntsen =

Norwegian footballer (born 1970)

Personal information
- Full name: Robin Berntsen
- Date of birth: 16 July 1970 (age 56)
- Place of birth: Nordbotn, Norway
- Height: 5 ft 11 in (1.80 m)
- Position: Utility player

Youth career
- 1975–1984: Ramfjord IL
- 1984–1987: Tromsø IL
- 1987–1988: Ramfjord IL
- 1988–1990: IF Fløya

Senior career*
Years	Team	Apps	(Gls)
1990–1991	Tromsø IL	9	(0)
1992	Vålerenga IF		
1993–1995	Tromsdalen UIL		
1996–2001	Tromsø IL	137	(8)
1998	→ Port Vale (loan)	1	(0)
Total		147+	(8+)
- * Club domestic league appearances and goals

Robin Berntsen (born 16 July 1970) is a Norwegian former footballer who played for Tromsø IL, Vålerenga IF, Tromsdalen UIL, and Port Vale. He won the Norwegian Football Cup with Tromsø in 1996.

== Career ==
Berntsen grew up in Nordbotn in Ramfjord and played football for Ramfjord IL from an early age until he was 14. In 1984, he began playing for the Tromsø IL youth team, before he returned to Ramfjord in 1987. He joined IF Fløya in 1988 and returned to Tromsø IL as an apprentice two years later. In 1992, when he was living in Oslo, he joined Vålerenga IF. After he moved back the following year, he played three seasons for Tromsdalen UIL before he again joined Tromsø in the Tippeligaen in 1996. In 1996, he also won the Norwegian Football Cup with Tromsø, as Terje Skarsfjord's side beat Bodø/Glimt 2–1 at the Ullevaal Stadion. He also played two European Cup Winners Cup games for the club. He played both legs of round two in a 3–2 win over Chelsea on 23 October 1997 and also played in the second leg, where they lost 7–1 at Stamford Bridge two weeks later, in which he was booked.

He joined Port Vale on loan in November 1998, who had right-backs Michael Walsh and Matt Carragher out injured. Berntsen played in a First Division match on 14 November 1998, in a 2–0 defeat to Sunderland at Vale Park. However, he then fell out with manager John Rudge, with Berntsen hoping to play in midfield rather than at full-back. He left the club at the end of the month and returned to Tromsø. He played his last game for Tromsø in October 2001, and retired in the following season due to an injury.

== Personal life ==
Berntsen is married with three children: Sondre, Joakim, and Markus.

== Honours ==
Tromsø

- Norwegian Football Cup: 1996
