= Tor André Grenersen =

Norwegian footballer (born 1969)

Personal information
- Date of birth: 11 November 1969 (age 56)

International career
Years	Team	Apps	(Gls)
1990–1991	Norway U21	12	(0)
1990	Norway	1	(0)

Tor André Grenersen (born 11 November 1969) is a retired Norwegian football goalkeeper.

He hails from Narvik and went through the ranks of FK Mjølner. The club had a short stint on the first tier, in the 1989 Norwegian First Division (the year before the league received the name Tippeligaen). He was also capped once during his spell at Mjølner. Later, in 1991, he joined first-tier club Tromsø IL. The club won the 1996 Norwegian Football Cup and famously beat Chelsea at home in the 1997–98 UEFA Cup Winners' Cup. Grenersen played for Tromsø until late 1997, when he retired.

He moved back to Narvik, and has among others served as youth coach and chairman in Mjølner.
