= Trym Bergman =

Norwegian footballer and manager (born 1969)

Personal information
- Date of birth: 24 January 1969 (age 57)
- Position: Midfielder

Youth career
- Ørn-Horten

Senior career*
| Years | Team | Apps | (Gls) |
| 1988–1991 | Ørn-Horten | | |
| 1992−1999 | Kongsvinger | 166 | (36) |
| 2000−2002 | Hammarby IF | 58 | (4) |
| 2003–2005 | Sandefjord | 77 | (12) |
| 2006–2007 | Ørn-Horten | | |

Managerial career
- 2013–2014: Ørn-Horten (coach)
- 2017−2018: Ørn-Horten (assistant coach)
- 2021: Kongsvinger (women) (coach)
- * Club domestic league appearances and goals

Trym Bergman (born 24 January 1969) is a Norwegian football manager and former midfielder.

Growing up in FK Ørn-Horten, he helped win the Norwegian Junior Cup and the Norway Cup in 1988. He played four seasons with their first team, citing Dag Riisnæs as his most skilled teammate. Ahead of the 1992 season he joined Eliteserien side Kongsvinger, where he amassed 166 league games and 25 cup games throughout the 1999 season.

In Autumn 1999 he embarked on a round of trials with English Football League clubs including Sheffield United and Bolton Wanderers. Although he scored and played well in his first match for Bolton, the trial was derailed when cleaners at his hotel found his snuff waste and mistakenly accused him of defecating in the wastepaper basket in his room.

Ahead of the 2000 season he instead moved to Swedish club Hammarby. He became league champion in 2001. From 2003 to 2005 he again played in his home county Vestfold, in Sandefjord, before finishing his career in Ørn-Horten.

Ahead of the 2013 season he was announced as one of two "first-team coaches" in Ørn-Horten, together with Cato Kihle, and under head coach Jørgen Jalland. The team lasted for two seasons. In 2017 Bergman returned as assistant coach.

He started coaching the Kongsvinger women's team, after he moved back to Kongsvinger a year prior.
