= Helge Bjønsaas =

Norwegian footballer (born 1968)

Personal information
- Date of birth: 21 May 1968 (age 58)
- Positions: Central defender; full-back

Youth career
- Haugar

Senior career*
Years	Team	Apps	(Gls)
–1991	Haugar		
1992–1996	Start		
1997–1999	Viking		
1999–2003	Start		
2004	FK Arendal		
- * Club domestic league appearances and goals

Helge Bjønsaas (born 21 May 1968) is a retired Norwegian footballer who played as a defender, either in central defense or full-back position.

Bjønsaas had a two-year contract with SK Haugar, due to expire in late 1991. He wanted to carry out his compulsory military service in Stavanger, but was instead ordered to Haakonsvern in Bergen. He started training with a Bergen-based club in the winter of 1991, Fyllingen, but Haugar and the FA both denied a transfer to Fyllingen.

He instead joined IK Start from Haugar ahead of the 1992 season, and remained there throughout 2003 except for two and a half seasons at Viking FK. In 2004 he signed for up-and-coming team FK Arendal.

The transfer to Viking was also subject to a transfer dispute. Start demanded that he continued to train with his former club, but Bjønsaas would reportedly prefer to retire.

Bjønsaas agreed to let Start buy him back in 1999. The transfer fee was 100,000 kr. With Start languishing in the 1. divisjon that year, Bjønsaas took part-time job for three months during the season, working as a delivery man for Christianssands Bryggeri. Start nonetheless managed to reach the promotion playoffs to the 2000 Eliteserien, in which they defeated Strømsgodset. Midway during the 2000 Eliteserien campaign, he yet again found himself in a public dispute about the length of his proposed contract. Start had offered one year, Bjønsaas demanded two years.
