= Fredrik Gärdeman =

Swedish footballer

Personal information
- Full name: Fredrik Gärdeman
- Date of birth: 23 May 1968 (age 58)
- Place of birth: Linköping, Sweden
- Height: 1.81 m (5 ft 11 in)
- Position: Striker

Senior career*
Years	Team	Apps	(Gls)
1988	Linköpings FF		
1988–1992	Åtvidabergs FF		(54)
1993–1996	Stabæk	72	(37)
1997–1998	Vålerenga	27	(6)
1998	→ Skeid (loan)		
1999–2000	Åtvidabergs FF		(28)
2001–2002	Kalmar FF	38	(14)
- * Club domestic league appearances and goals

Fredrik Gärdeman (born 23 May 1968) is a Swedish retired football striker.
