= Terje Ellingsen =

Norwegian footballer

Personal information
- Date of birth: 13 January 1971 (age 55)
- Height: 1.76 m (5 ft 9 in)
- Positions: Striker; winger

Youth career
- –1988: Andenes
- 1988–1989: Mjølner

Senior career*
Years	Team	Apps	(Gls)
–1988	Andenes		
1989–1995	Mjølner		
1996–1998	Bodø/Glimt	51	(6)
1999–2001	Start	50	(5)
2002	Narvik FK	0	(0)

Managerial career
- 2002–2004: Start 2
- * Club domestic league appearances and goals

Terje Ellingsen (born 13 January 1971) is a Norwegian footballer who played as a forward.

== Career ==
Ellingsen played for Andenes IL in the third tier, among others together with future First Division player Fredrik Horn, before moving to Narvik to attend upper secondary school there. He made his debut for Mjølner's youth team in 1988. In 1989 he made his senior debut, playing twice in the highest league. Mjølner were relegated, spending the following years on the second tier.

He made his Eliteserien debut in April 1996 against Moss, incidentally playing in three different positions during that match: left back, left winger and right midfielder. Later that month, he scored his first Eliteserien goal against Start, in his home debut at Aspmyra stadion. Already on 1 May, Ellingsen collided with a Strømsgodset player and was badly injured. He was concussed, suffered from amnesia, swallowed his tongue along with blood that blocked respiration, and almost died on the pitch. He was saved by Bodø/Glimt's physiotherapist, who cleared the blockage before EMT personnel arrived. In the end, he missed football for a little more than three weeks.

He played the 1996 Norwegian Football Cup final as a 77th-minute substitute, but Bodø/Glimt lost the match, which was a North Norwegian derby against Tromsø. In the 1996–97 UEFA Cup he played both legs against Beitar Jerusalem and one against Trabzonspor, who ultimately knocked Bodø/Glimt out.

In the summer of 1998, Ellingsen was approached by IK Start. As his contract expired at the end of the year, he agreed to visit Start. Ellingsen received a contract offer, but publicly stated disappointment in the proposed wage being too low. Following prolonged discussions, the transfer went through in late January 1999. He would move with his entire family to Kristiansand.

As the 2001 season was closing, Ellingsen would not receive a new contract offer, and decided to retire. In the fall of 2002, Ellingsen was contacted by Narvik FK about strengthening the team ahead of the two-legged playoff to the Norwegian Second Division. Ellingsen agreed, helping Narvik FK to win the playoff.

== Personal life ==
His hobby was painting. After retiring at the end of 2001, he started working in Signshop as a graphic designer.
