= Per Egil Swift =

Norwegian footballer (born 1972)

Per Egil Swift (born 22 January 1972) is a retired Norwegian football midfielder and winger.

He hails from Åsgårdstrand and played youth football for Slagen, Åsgårdstrand and Eik-Tønsberg. He rose as a talent and won several youth caps for Norway, making also his first-team debut at Eik in 1990. After three seasons, in 1993 he played for IK Start and from 1994 to 1997 for Tromsø IL. He won the 1996 Norwegian Football Cup Final during his time there.

Swift transferred to Lyn in 1998, remaining throughout the 2003 season. He then spent one season in Vålerenga, being one of the players to represent both Oslo rivals. In 2005 he moved home to Tønsberg to be player-manager for the recently merged club FK Tønsberg.
