= Thomas Tøllefsen =

Norwegian footballer (born 1973)

Thomas Tøllefsen (born 26 September 1973) is a retired Norwegian football goalkeeper.

He hails from Lyngseidet and started his career in Karnes IL. He made his senior debut in 1989, then continued his career in Lyngen/Karnes IL following a club merger. He was discovered by first-tier club Tromsø IL in a 1991 Norwegian Football Cup, and after playing well he was signed by Tromsø. He played for Tromsø until 2003, but after playing three games in the 2003 Tippeligaen he broke his leg in a match for the B team.

Tøllefsen has been goalkeeping coach for IF Skarp and Tromsø IL's junior team. He is a librarian by profession.
