= Sørlandshallen =

Sports hall in Kristiansand, Norway

Coordinates: 58°10′45.876″N 8°8′56.407″E

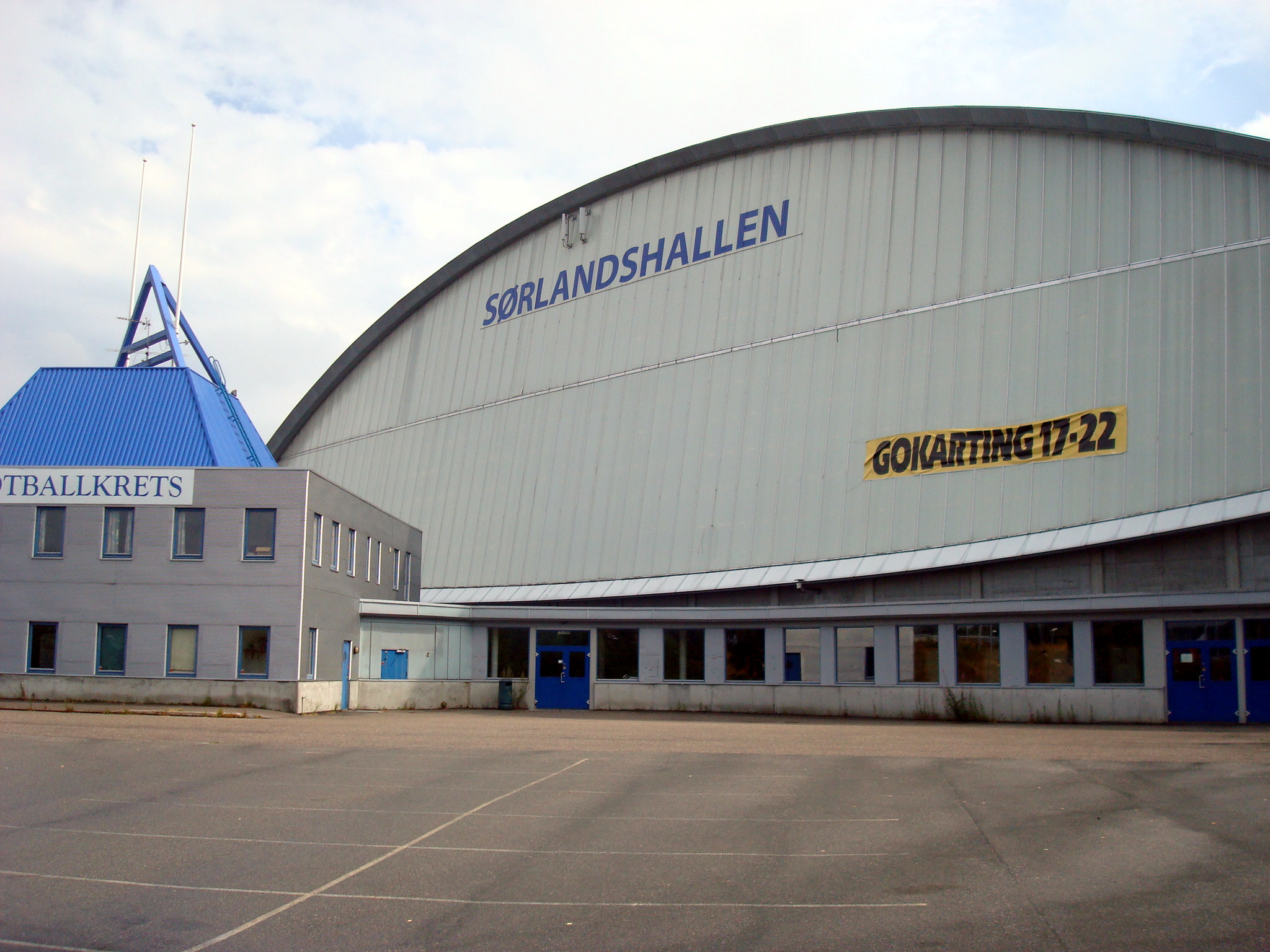
Sørlandshallen in 2013

Sørlandshallen is a sports hall in Kristiansand, Norway.

The hall was put into use in 1992. It is located in Sørlandsparken by the E18, east of the city center near Kristiansand Dyrepark, Sørlandets Travpark and Sørlandssenteret. The hall is used by local football teams for indoor football, including IK Start (which has training facilities there during the winter months). The hall is also sometimes used for indoor gocart. Occasionally also occur organized trade fairs, congresses, concerts, banquets and the like. Sørlandshallen has 7500 m^{2} of exhibition space.
