= Dag Riisnæs =

Norwegian footballer (born 1969)

Personal information
- Date of birth: 20 June 1969 (age 57)
- Height: 1.78 m (5 ft 10 in)
- Position: Midfielder

Senior career*
| Years | Team | Apps | (Gls) |
| 1989–1994 | Kongsvinger | 117 | (32) |
| 1995–2000 | Vålerenga Fotball | 122 | (16) |
| Total | | 239 | (48) |

International career
| 1986 | Norway U17 | 3 | (0) |
| 1989 | Norway U21 | 3 | (0) |
| 1989–1991 | Norway | 5 | (0) |
- * Club domestic league appearances and goals

Dag Riisnæs (born 20 June 1969) is a Norwegian former footballer who played as a midfielder. He made six appearances for the Norway national team from 1989 to 1991.
