= 1990 Norwegian Third Division =

Norwegian association football league

The 1990 3. divisjon, the third highest association football league for men in Norway. From 1991, the third tier was renamed as 2. divisjon.

22 games were played in 6 groups, with 3 points given for wins and 1 for draws. Drøbak/Frogn, Elverum, Haugar, Fana, Surnadal and Tromsdalen were promoted to the 2. divisjon. Number ten, eleven and twelve were relegated to the 4. divisjon.

== League tables ==
=== Group A ===
Pos	Team	Pld	W	D	L	GF	GA	GD	Pts	Promotion or relegation
1	Drøbak/Frogn (P)	22	19	1	2	73	16	+57	58	Promotion to First Division
2	Fram (Larvik)	22	19	0	3	62	26	+36	57	
3	Sarpsborg	22	16	1	5	65	27	+38	49	
4	Odd	22	10	2	10	38	45	−7	32	
5	Bærum	22	8	5	9	39	42	−3	29	
6	Ullern	22	8	4	10	38	36	+2	28	
7	Ørn	22	9	1	12	28	37	−9	28	
8	Asker	22	7	7	8	29	45	−16	28	
9	Selbak	22	7	2	13	27	44	−17	23	
10	Runar (R)	22	6	3	13	32	57	−25	21	Relegation to Third Division
11	Askim (R)	22	5	1	16	31	55	−24	16	Relegation to Third Division
12	Urædd (R)	22	3	3	16	26	58	−32	12	Relegation to Third Division

(P) Promoted; (R) Relegated

=== Group B ===
Pos	Team	Pld	W	D	L	GF	GA	GD	Pts	Promotion or relegation
1	Elverum (P)	22	16	4	2	60	21	+39	52	Promotion to First Division
2	Kjelsås	22	12	5	5	40	21	+19	41	
3	Grei	22	11	4	7	43	38	+5	37	
4	Bjørkelangen	22	10	4	8	35	33	+2	34	
5	Eidsvold Turn	22	11	1	10	35	36	−1	34	
6	Skeid	22	9	3	10	43	47	−4	30	
7	Lørenskog	22	8	5	9	37	30	+7	29	
8	Nybergsund	22	8	5	9	30	34	−4	29	
9	Aurskog/Fin.bru	22	7	5	10	32	38	−6	26	
10	Raufoss (R)	22	8	2	12	32	42	−10	26	Relegation to Third Division
11	Høland (R)	22	6	5	11	26	40	−14	23	Relegation to Third Division
12	Brumunddal (R)	22	3	3	16	26	59	−33	12	Relegation to Third Division

(P) Promoted; (R) Relegated

=== Group C ===
Pos	Team	Pld	W	D	L	GF	GA	GD	Pts	Promotion or relegation
1	Haugar (P)	22	15	3	4	51	23	+28	48	Promotion to First Division
2	Vard	22	14	4	4	56	23	+33	46	
3	Randaberg	22	13	2	7	51	33	+18	41	
4	Jerv	22	9	6	7	47	37	+10	33	
5	Ulf-Sandnes	22	8	7	7	42	30	+12	31	
6	Ålgård	22	8	5	9	31	39	−8	29	
7	Donn	22	8	4	10	40	44	−4	28	
8	Skjold	22	6	10	6	30	34	−4	28	
9	Figgjo	22	6	6	10	25	40	−15	24	
10	Klepp (R)	22	5	8	9	36	42	−6	23	Relegation to Third Division
11	Vidar (R)	22	5	3	14	28	54	−26	18	Relegation to Third Division
12	Eiger (R)	22	5	2	15	25	63	−38	17	Relegation to Third Division

(P) Promoted; (R) Relegated

=== Group D ===
Pos	Team	Pld	W	D	L	GF	GA	GD	Pts	Promotion or relegation
1	Fana (P)	22	12	6	4	40	26	+14	42	Promotion to First Division
2	Åsane	22	13	2	7	50	26	+24	41	
3	Volda	22	10	9	3	39	20	+19	39	
4	Lyngbø	22	9	8	5	28	19	+9	35	
5	Stranda	22	8	8	6	28	24	+4	32	
6	Vadmyra	22	7	9	6	21	13	+8	30	
7	Mercantile	22	7	8	7	31	27	+4	29	
8	Brattvåg	22	6	8	8	21	32	−11	26	
9	Førde	22	8	1	13	17	45	−28	25	
10	Eid (R)	22	5	8	9	33	39	−6	23	Relegation to Third Division
11	Hareid	22	4	7	11	25	44	−19	19	Relegation to Third Division
12	Stryn (R)	22	4	4	14	24	42	−18	16	Relegation to Third Division

(P) Promoted; (R) Relegated

=== Group E ===
Pos	Team	Pld	W	D	L	GF	GA	GD	Pts	Promotion or relegation
1	Surnadal (P)	22	16	2	4	57	26	+31	50	Promotion to First Division
2	Åndalsnes	22	14	4	4	47	26	+21	46	
3	Stjørdals/Blink	22	12	4	6	47	35	+12	40	
4	Steinkjer	22	10	4	8	35	29	+6	34	
5	Sunndal	22	9	6	7	31	32	−1	33	
6	KIL/Hemne	22	9	4	9	32	39	−7	31	
7	Melhus	22	8	6	8	55	33	+22	30	
8	Nessegutten	22	7	6	9	36	38	−2	27	
9	Alvdal	22	7	5	10	30	38	−8	26	
10	Sverre (R)	22	8	1	13	38	55	−17	25	Relegation to Third Division
11	Ready (R)	22	5	2	15	30	52	−22	17	Relegation to Third Division
12	Clausenengen (R)	22	3	4	15	26	61	−35	13	Relegation to Third Division

(P) Promoted; (R) Relegated

=== Group F ===
Pos	Team	Pld	W	D	L	GF	GA	GD	Pts	Promotion or relegation
1	Tromsdalen (P)	22	16	3	3	60	16	+44	51	Promotion to First Division
2	Bodø/Glimt	22	15	5	2	64	21	+43	50	
3	Narvik/Nor	22	14	3	5	42	24	+18	45	
4	Stålkameratene	22	12	3	7	45	32	+13	39	
5	Fauske/Sprint	22	12	1	9	48	39	+9	37	
6	Alta	22	10	5	7	32	31	+1	35	
7	Harstad	22	9	3	10	40	34	+6	30	
8	Andenes	22	6	5	11	47	49	−2	23	
9	Sandnessjøen (R)	22	6	3	13	22	41	−19	21	Relegation to Third Division
10	Mosjøen (R)	22	5	3	14	30	62	−32	18	Relegation to Third Division
11	Nordkjosbotn (R)	22	6	0	16	25	57	−32	18	Relegation to Third Division
12	Luna (R)	22	2	4	16	20	69	−49	10	Relegation to Third Division

(P) Promoted; (R) Relegated
