= Morten Pettersen (footballer, born 1970) =

Norwegian footballer

Personal information
- Full name: Morten Ørum Pettersen
- Date of birth: 25 February 1970 (age 56)
- Position: Midfielder

Senior career*
Years	Team	Apps	(Gls)
–1989	Jerv		
1990–1996	Start		
1997–1998	Brann		
1999	Start		

International career
1991	Norway u-21	5	(0)
- * Club domestic league appearances and goals

Morten Pettersen (born 25 February 1970) is a retired Norwegian football midfielder.

He joined IK Start from FK Jerv ahead of the 1990 season, and remained there throughout 1999 except for two seasons at SK Brann.
