= Jonny Hanssen (footballer) =

Norwegian footballer (born 1972)

Personal information
- Date of birth: 13 December 1972 (age 53)
- Place of birth: Narvik, Norway
- Height: 1.80 m (5 ft 11 in)
- Position: Midfielder

Youth career
- Mjølner

Senior career*
Years	Team	Apps	(Gls)
1991–1993	Mjølner		
1994–1997	Tromsø	86	(6)
1997–1999	Eendracht Aalst	30	(0)
2000–2001	Tromsø	46	(7)
2002–2004	Lyn	56	(5)
2004–2006	Aarhus GF	36	(4)
2006	Mjølner	21	(5)
2007–2008	Drøbak-Frogn		
2009–2010	Grovfjord		

International career
1997–2003	Norway	5	(0)

Managerial career
- Frognerparken
- Frigg
- Ready
- Hasle-Løren
- Løten
- 2020–: Raumnes og Årnes
- * Club domestic league appearances and goals

Jonny Hanssen (born 13 December 1972) is a retired Norwegian football midfielder.

Hanssen became a manager, coaching Frognerparken FK, Frigg Oslo FK, IF Ready, Hasle-Løren IL, Løten FK and from 2020 Raumnes og Årnes IL.
