= 1991 in Norwegian football =

Football in Norway
- Season: 1991

Men's football
- Tippeligaen: Viking
- 1. divisjon: Mjøndalen (Group A); HamKam (Group B)
- Cupen: Strømsgodset

Women's football
- 1. divisjon: Asker
- Cupen: Asker

The 1991 season was the 86th season of competitive football in Norway.

== Men's football ==
=== League season ===
==== Promotion and relegation ====
League	Promoted to league	Relegated from league
Tippeligaen	Sogndal; Lyn	VIF Fotball; Moss
1. divisjon	Drøbak/Frogn; Elverum; Fana; Haugar; Surnadal; Tromsdalen	Os; Stord; Faaberg; Skarp; Namsos; Sprint-Jeløy

==== Tippeligaen ====
Pos	Team	Pld	W	D	L	GF	GA	GD	Pts	Qualification or relegation
1	Viking (C)	22	12	5	5	37	27	+10	41	Qualification for the Champions League first round
2	Rosenborg	22	10	6	6	38	28	+10	36	Qualification for the UEFA Cup first round
3	Start	22	10	4	8	31	21	+10	34	
4	Lyn	22	8	10	4	26	26	0	34	
5	Lillestrøm	22	9	4	9	31	27	+4	31	
6	Tromsø	22	9	4	9	28	34	−6	31	
7	Molde	22	7	6	9	33	38	−5	27	
8	Kongsvinger	22	7	6	9	26	34	−8	27	
9	Sogndal	22	7	6	9	22	31	−9	27	
10	Brann (O)	22	6	8	8	22	25	−3	26	Qualification for the relegation play-offs
11	Fyllingen (R)	22	6	7	9	21	21	0	25	Relegation to First Division
12	Strømsgodset (R)	22	5	6	11	30	33	−3	21	Cup Winners' Cup qualifying and relegation to First Division

Source: fotball.no
Rules for classification: 1) points; 2) goal difference; 3) number of goals scored.
(C) Champions; (O) Play-off winners; (R) Relegated

==== 1. divisjon ====
===== Group A =====
Pos	Team	Pld	W	D	L	GF	GA	GD	Pts	Promotion, qualification or relegation
1	Mjøndalen (C, P)	22	17	2	3	55	19	+36	53	Promotion to Tippeligaen
2	Bryne	22	14	3	5	31	16	+15	45	Qualification for the promotion play-offs
3	VIF Fotball	22	13	1	8	31	26	+5	40	
4	Hødd	22	9	6	7	41	31	+10	33	
5	Aalesund	22	9	6	7	31	24	+7	33	
6	Fana	22	8	8	6	32	37	−5	32	
7	Strømmen	22	9	3	10	33	31	+2	30	
8	Djerv 1919	22	8	3	11	39	37	+2	27	
9	Haugar	22	6	7	9	34	40	−6	25	
10	Kristiansund (R)	22	7	4	11	19	35	−16	25	Relegation to Second Division
11	Frigg (R)	22	4	6	12	21	37	−16	18	Relegation to Second Division
12	Surnadal (R)	22	2	3	17	20	54	−34	9	Relegation to Second Division

Source: nifs.no
Rules for classification: 1) points; 2) goal difference; 3) number of goals scored.
(C) Champions; (P) Promoted; (R) Relegated

===== Group B =====
Pos	Team	Pld	W	D	L	GF	GA	GD	Pts	Promotion, qualification or relegation
1	HamKam (C, P)	22	15	6	1	64	22	+42	51	Promotion to Tippeligaen
2	Strindheim	22	13	3	6	37	24	+13	42	Qualification for the promotion play-offs
3	Fredrikstad	22	12	4	6	47	27	+20	40	
4	Eik-Tønsberg	22	11	4	7	44	29	+15	37	
5	Tromsdalen	22	10	3	9	32	28	+4	33	
6	Elverum	22	10	2	10	38	37	+1	32	
7	Drøbak/Frogn	22	9	5	8	36	35	+1	32	
8	Moss	22	9	4	9	32	30	+2	31	
9	Pors	22	6	6	10	23	50	−27	24	
10	Mjølner (R)	22	6	4	12	27	47	−20	22	Relegation to Second Division
11	Råde (R)	22	3	6	13	19	45	−26	15	Relegation to Second Division
12	Sandefjord BK (R)	22	2	5	15	24	49	−25	11	Relegation to Second Division

Source: nifs.no
Rules for classification: 1) points; 2) goal difference; 3) number of goals scored.
(C) Champions; (P) Promoted; (R) Relegated

==== 2. divisjon ====
===== Group 1 =====
Pos	Team	Pld	W	D	L	GF	GA	GD	Pts	Promotion or relegation
1	Odd (P)	22	16	2	4	60	30	+30	50	Promotion to First Division
2	Fram Larvik	22	15	3	4	52	28	+24	48	
3	Grei	22	14	3	5	40	18	+22	45	
4	Skeid	22	13	5	4	65	29	+36	44	
5	Ørn-Horten	22	10	4	8	40	41	−1	34	
6	Lillestrøm 2	22	10	3	9	45	40	+5	33	
7	Falk	22	8	4	10	41	44	−3	28	
8	Lørenskog	22	7	5	10	31	45	−14	26	
9	Sørumsand	22	5	6	11	30	46	−16	21	
10	Aurskog/Finstadbru (R)	22	4	6	12	31	49	−18	18	Relegation to Third Division
11	Eidsvold TF (R)	22	5	1	16	27	53	−26	16	Relegation to Third Division
12	Bjørkelangen (R)	22	4	0	18	27	68	−41	12	Relegation to Third Division

(P) Promoted; (R) Relegated

===== Group 2 =====
Pos	Team	Pld	W	D	L	GF	GA	GD	Pts	Promotion or relegation
1	Bærum (P)	22	17	2	3	60	20	+40	53	Promotion to First Division
2	Stabæk	22	12	5	5	39	19	+20	41	
3	Kjelsås	22	10	7	5	40	29	+11	37	
4	Nybergsund	22	10	6	6	36	35	+1	36	
5	Sarpsborg	22	9	6	7	40	35	+5	33	
6	Faaberg	22	9	6	7	34	30	+4	33	
7	Mercantile	22	8	7	7	24	27	−3	31	
8	Ullern	22	8	5	9	37	40	−3	29	
9	Sprint-Jeløy	22	6	6	10	37	41	−4	24	
10	Selbak (R)	22	4	7	11	25	44	−19	19	Relegation to Third Division
11	Tune (R)	22	4	6	12	26	47	−21	18	Relegation to Third Division
12	Strømsgodset 2 (R)	22	2	3	17	14	45	−31	9	Relegation to Third Division

(P) Promoted; (R) Relegated

===== Group 3 =====
Pos	Team	Pld	W	D	L	GF	GA	GD	Pts	Promotion or relegation
1	Vard (P)	22	18	1	3	48	13	+35	55	Promotion to First Division
2	Stord	22	16	1	5	53	31	+22	49	
3	Viking 2	22	13	4	5	70	22	+48	43	
4	Start 2	22	12	4	6	35	22	+13	40	
5	Jerv	22	10	1	11	35	48	−13	31	
6	Ålgård	22	9	3	10	27	31	−4	30	
7	Donn	22	8	4	10	39	56	−17	28	
8	Asker	22	7	4	11	33	57	−24	25	
9	Ulf-Sandnes	22	6	6	10	36	36	0	24	
10	Randaberg (R)	22	7	2	13	30	44	−14	23	Relegation to Third Division
11	Figgjo (R)	22	5	5	12	28	40	−12	20	Relegation to Third Division
12	Skjold (R)	22	3	1	18	23	57	−34	10	Relegation to Third Division

(P) Promoted; (R) Relegated

===== Group 4 =====
Pos	Team	Pld	W	D	L	GF	GA	GD	Pts	Promotion or relegation
1	Brann 2	22	14	2	6	53	24	+29	44	
2	Fyllingen 2	22	13	3	6	58	28	+30	42	
3	Os (P)	22	11	3	8	30	20	+10	36	Promotion to First Division
4	Skarbøvik	22	10	6	6	40	36	+4	36	
5	Volda	22	9	4	9	30	36	−6	31	
6	Vadmyra	22	8	7	7	28	37	−9	31	
7	Åsane	22	8	4	10	31	32	−1	28	
8	Stranda	22	7	7	8	26	29	−3	28	
9	Lyngbø	22	7	5	10	25	33	−8	26	
10	Florø	22	6	6	10	27	44	−17	24	Relegation to Third Division
11	Brattvåg (R)	22	6	5	11	25	29	−4	23	Relegation to Third Division
12	Førde (R)	22	4	6	12	21	47	−26	18	Relegation to Third Division

(P) Promoted; (R) Relegated

===== Group 5 =====
Pos	Team	Pld	W	D	L	GF	GA	GD	Pts	Promotion or relegation
1	Rosenborg 2	22	12	4	6	56	30	+26	40	
2	Stjørdals-Blink (P)	22	12	4	6	38	27	+11	40	Promotion to First Division
3	Melhus	22	11	6	5	35	23	+12	39	
4	Byåsen	22	9	6	7	37	34	+3	33	
5	Åndalsnes	22	9	5	8	38	36	+2	32	
6	Namsos	22	8	7	7	33	37	−4	31	
7	Alvdal	22	8	6	8	33	38	−5	30	
8	Steinkjer	22	8	5	9	30	28	+2	29	
9	KIL/Hemne	22	7	7	8	36	37	−1	28	
10	Sunndal (R)	22	8	4	10	34	42	−8	28	Relegation to Third Division
11	Nessegutten (R)	22	7	2	13	40	48	−8	23	Relegation to Third Division
12	Molde 2 (R)	22	4	2	16	38	68	−30	14	Relegation to Third Division

(P) Promoted; (R) Relegated

===== Group 6 =====
Pos	Team	Pld	W	D	L	GF	GA	GD	Pts	Promotion or relegation
1	Bodø/Glimt (P)	22	19	2	1	67	16	+51	59	Promotion to First Division
2	Stålkameratene	22	13	2	7	51	42	+9	41	
3	Grovfjord	22	11	5	6	48	28	+20	38	
4	Narvik/Nor	22	11	4	7	58	34	+24	37	
5	Skarp	22	11	2	9	42	32	+10	35	
6	Honningsvåg	22	10	2	10	38	37	+1	32	
7	Alta	22	9	3	10	34	39	−5	30	
8	Gevir/Vinkelen	22	9	3	10	37	50	−13	30	
9	Andenes (R)	22	9	2	11	28	40	−12	29	Relegation to Third Division
10	Harstad (R)	22	6	4	12	29	35	−6	22	Relegation to Third Division
11	Skjervøy (R)	22	6	2	14	26	68	−42	20	Relegation to Third Division
12	Fauske/Sprint (R)	22	2	1	19	19	57	−38	7	Relegation to Third Division

(P) Promoted; (R) Relegated

=== Norwegian Cup ===
==== Final ====
20 October 1991
13:15 CET (UTC+1)

Strømsgodset	3–2	Rosenborg
Johnsen 14', 28'; Nordeide 70'	Report	Løken 3'; Sørloth 71'

Ullevaal Stadion, Oslo
Attendance: 27,240
Referee: Roy Helge Olsen (Frigg)

== Women's football ==
=== League season ===
==== 1. divisjon ====
Pos	Team	Pld	W	D	L	GF	GA	GD	Pts	Relegation
1	Asker (C)	18	16	2	0	88	12	+76	50	
2	Sprint/Jeløy	18	12	4	2	47	20	+27	40	
3	Sandviken	18	11	0	7	29	27	+2	33	
4	Setskog/Høland	18	9	1	8	49	46	+3	28	
5	Klepp	18	6	6	6	32	31	+1	24	
6	Grand Bodø	18	5	4	9	22	42	−20	19	
7	Bøler	18	6	1	11	22	46	−24	19	
8	Trondheims-Ørn	18	5	3	10	34	40	−6	18	
9	BUL (R)	18	5	3	10	28	39	−11	18	Relegation to Second Division
10	Skedsmo (R)	18	1	4	13	20	68	−48	7	Relegation to Second Division

(C) Champions; (R) Relegated

=== Norwegian Women's Cup ===
==== Final ====
- Asker 8–0 Sandviken

== UEFA competitions ==
=== European Cup ===
==== First round ====
Team 1	Agg.	Team 2	1st leg	2nd leg
Sampdoria (Italy)	7–1	(Norway) Rosenborg	5–0	2–1

=== European Cup Winners' Cup ===
==== First round ====
Team 1	Agg.	Team 2	1st leg	2nd leg
Fyllingen (Norway)	2–8	(Spain) Atlético Madrid	0–1	2–7

=== UEFA Cup ===
==== First round ====
Team 1	Agg.	Team 2	1st leg	2nd leg
Swarovski Tirol (Austria)	3–2	(Norway) Tromsø IL	2–1	1–1

== National teams ==
=== Norway men's national football team ===
==== Results ====
17 April 1991 Friendly	Austria	0–0	Norway	Vienna, Austria
19:30 CET (UTC+1)		Report		Stadium: Praterstadion; Attendance: 36,000; Referee: Zdravko Đokić (Yugoslavia)
