= 1990 in Norwegian football =

Football in Norway
- Season: 1990

Men's football
- Tippeligaen: Rosenborg
- 2. divisjon: Sogndal (Group A); Lyn (Group B)
- Cupen: Rosenborg

Women's football
- 1. divisjon: Sprint/Jeløy
- Cupen: Asker

The 1990 season was the 85th season of competitive football in Norway.

== Men's football ==
=== League season ===
==== Promotion and relegation ====
| League | Promoted to league | Relegated from league |
|---|---|---|
| 1. divisjon | Fyllingen; Strømsgodset | Sogndal; Mjølner |
| 2. divisjon | Hødd; Kristiansund; Os; Sandefjord BK; Skarp; Sprint/Jeløy | Bodø/Glimt; Clausenengen; Drøbak/Frogn; Harstad; Vard; Vidar |

==== Tippeligaen ====
| Pos | Team | Pld | W | D | L | GF | GA | GD | Pts | Qualification or relegation |
|---|---|---|---|---|---|---|---|---|---|---|
| 1 | Rosenborg (C) | 22 | 13 | 5 | 4 | 60 | 24 | +36 | 44 | Qualification for the European Cup first round |
| 2 | Tromsø | 22 | 12 | 6 | 4 | 36 | 21 | +15 | 42 | Qualification for the UEFA Cup first round |
| 3 | Molde | 22 | 12 | 4 | 6 | 34 | 29 | +5 | 40 | |
| 4 | Brann | 22 | 11 | 6 | 5 | 34 | 25 | +9 | 39 | |
| 5 | Viking | 22 | 10 | 5 | 7 | 41 | 30 | +11 | 35 | |
| 6 | Start | 22 | 9 | 4 | 9 | 39 | 34 | +5 | 31 | |
| 7 | Fyllingen | 22 | 7 | 7 | 8 | 23 | 30 | −7 | 28 | Qualification for the Cup Winners' Cup first round |
| 8 | Kongsvinger | 22 | 7 | 6 | 9 | 24 | 32 | −8 | 27 | |
| 9 | Strømsgodset | 22 | 8 | 3 | 11 | 29 | 45 | −16 | 27 | |
| 10 | Lillestrøm (O) | 22 | 7 | 4 | 11 | 30 | 30 | 0 | 25 | Qualification for the relegation play-offs |
| 11 | VIF Fotball (R) | 22 | 4 | 4 | 14 | 26 | 53 | −27 | 16 | Relegation to First Division |
| 12 | Moss (R) | 22 | 3 | 4 | 15 | 24 | 47 | −23 | 13 | Relegation to First Division |

Source: fotball.no
Rules for classification: 1) points; 2) goal difference; 3) number of goals scored.
(C) Champions; (O) Play-off winners; (R) Relegated

==== 2. divisjon ====
===== Group A =====
| Pos | Team | Pld | W | D | L | GF | GA | GD | Pts | Promotion, qualification or relegation |
|---|---|---|---|---|---|---|---|---|---|---|
| 1 | Sogndal (C, P) | 22 | 15 | 3 | 4 | 42 | 23 | +19 | 48 | Promotion to Tippeligaen |
| 2 | Bryne | 22 | 14 | 2 | 6 | 34 | 20 | +14 | 44 | Qualification for the promotion play-offs |
| 3 | HamKam | 22 | 13 | 4 | 5 | 53 | 28 | +25 | 43 | |
| 4 | Strømmen | 22 | 12 | 5 | 5 | 40 | 13 | +27 | 41 | |
| 5 | Aalesund | 22 | 11 | 4 | 7 | 40 | 31 | +9 | 37 | |
| 6 | Djerv 1919 | 22 | 9 | 5 | 8 | 23 | 22 | +1 | 32 | |
| 7 | Hødd | 22 | 5 | 8 | 9 | 27 | 34 | −7 | 23 | |
| 8 | Kristiansund | 22 | 5 | 7 | 10 | 22 | 37 | −15 | 22 | |
| 9 | Frigg | 22 | 5 | 5 | 12 | 23 | 43 | −20 | 20 | |
| 10 | Os (R) | 22 | 4 | 7 | 11 | 18 | 35 | −17 | 19 | Relegation to Second Division |
| 11 | Stord (R) | 22 | 4 | 6 | 12 | 22 | 38 | −16 | 18 | Relegation to Second Division |
| 12 | Faaberg (R) | 22 | 3 | 8 | 11 | 16 | 36 | −20 | 17 | Relegation to Second Division |

Source: rsssf.no
Rules for classification: 1) points; 2) goal difference; 3) number of goals scored.
(C) Champions; (P) Promoted; (R) Relegated

===== Group B =====
| Pos | Team | Pld | W | D | L | GF | GA | GD | Pts | Promotion, qualification or relegation |
|---|---|---|---|---|---|---|---|---|---|---|
| 1 | Lyn (C, P) | 22 | 14 | 3 | 5 | 50 | 23 | +27 | 45 | Promotion to Tippeligaen |
| 2 | Eik | 22 | 14 | 3 | 5 | 45 | 22 | +23 | 45 | Qualification for the promotion play-offs |
| 3 | Mjøndalen | 22 | 13 | 4 | 5 | 38 | 23 | +15 | 43 | |
| 4 | Mjølner | 22 | 10 | 8 | 4 | 29 | 21 | +8 | 38 | |
| 5 | Strindheim | 22 | 11 | 2 | 9 | 30 | 26 | +4 | 35 | |
| 6 | Sandefjord BK | 22 | 9 | 5 | 8 | 24 | 22 | +2 | 32 | |
| 7 | Råde | 22 | 6 | 5 | 11 | 24 | 31 | −7 | 23 | |
| 8 | Fredrikstad | 22 | 5 | 8 | 9 | 18 | 33 | −15 | 23 | |
| 9 | Pors | 22 | 6 | 4 | 12 | 25 | 36 | −11 | 22 | |
| 10 | Skarp (R) | 22 | 5 | 7 | 10 | 19 | 34 | −15 | 22 | Relegation to Second Division |
| 11 | Namsos (R) | 22 | 5 | 5 | 12 | 29 | 40 | −11 | 20 | Relegation to Second Division |
| 12 | Sprint-Jeløy (R) | 22 | 4 | 6 | 12 | 19 | 39 | −20 | 18 | Relegation to Second Division |

Source: rsssf.no
Rules for classification: 1) points; 2) goal difference; 3) number of goals scored.
(C) Champions; (P) Promoted; (R) Relegated

==== 3. divisjon ====
===== Group A =====
| Pos | Team | Pld | W | D | L | GF | GA | GD | Pts | Promotion or relegation |
|---|---|---|---|---|---|---|---|---|---|---|
| 1 | Drøbak/Frogn (P) | 22 | 19 | 1 | 2 | 73 | 16 | +57 | 58 | Promotion to First Division |
| 2 | Fram (Larvik) | 22 | 19 | 0 | 3 | 62 | 26 | +36 | 57 | |
| 3 | Sarpsborg | 22 | 16 | 1 | 5 | 65 | 27 | +38 | 49 | |
| 4 | Odd | 22 | 10 | 2 | 10 | 38 | 45 | −7 | 32 | |
| 5 | Bærum | 22 | 8 | 5 | 9 | 39 | 42 | −3 | 29 | |
| 6 | Ullern | 22 | 8 | 4 | 10 | 38 | 36 | +2 | 28 | |
| 7 | Ørn | 22 | 9 | 1 | 12 | 28 | 37 | −9 | 28 | |
| 8 | Asker | 22 | 7 | 7 | 8 | 29 | 45 | −16 | 28 | |
| 9 | Selbak | 22 | 7 | 2 | 13 | 27 | 44 | −17 | 23 | |
| 10 | Runar (R) | 22 | 6 | 3 | 13 | 32 | 57 | −25 | 21 | Relegation to Third Division |
| 11 | Askim (R) | 22 | 5 | 1 | 16 | 31 | 55 | −24 | 16 | Relegation to Third Division |
| 12 | Urædd (R) | 22 | 3 | 3 | 16 | 26 | 58 | −32 | 12 | Relegation to Third Division |

(P) Promoted; (R) Relegated

===== Group B =====
| Pos | Team | Pld | W | D | L | GF | GA | GD | Pts | Promotion or relegation |
|---|---|---|---|---|---|---|---|---|---|---|
| 1 | Elverum (P) | 22 | 16 | 4 | 2 | 60 | 21 | +39 | 52 | Promotion to First Division |
| 2 | Kjelsås | 22 | 12 | 5 | 5 | 40 | 21 | +19 | 41 | |
| 3 | Grei | 22 | 11 | 4 | 7 | 43 | 38 | +5 | 37 | |
| 4 | Bjørkelangen | 22 | 10 | 4 | 8 | 35 | 33 | +2 | 34 | |
| 5 | Eidsvold Turn | 22 | 11 | 1 | 10 | 35 | 36 | −1 | 34 | |
| 6 | Skeid | 22 | 9 | 3 | 10 | 43 | 47 | −4 | 30 | |
| 7 | Lørenskog | 22 | 8 | 5 | 9 | 37 | 30 | +7 | 29 | |
| 8 | Nybergsund | 22 | 8 | 5 | 9 | 30 | 34 | −4 | 29 | |
| 9 | Aurskog/Fin.bru | 22 | 7 | 5 | 10 | 32 | 38 | −6 | 26 | |
| 10 | Raufoss (R) | 22 | 8 | 2 | 12 | 32 | 42 | −10 | 26 | Relegation to Third Division |
| 11 | Høland (R) | 22 | 6 | 5 | 11 | 26 | 40 | −14 | 23 | Relegation to Third Division |
| 12 | Brumunddal (R) | 22 | 3 | 3 | 16 | 26 | 59 | −33 | 12 | Relegation to Third Division |

(P) Promoted; (R) Relegated

===== Group C =====
| Pos | Team | Pld | W | D | L | GF | GA | GD | Pts | Promotion or relegation |
|---|---|---|---|---|---|---|---|---|---|---|
| 1 | Haugar (P) | 22 | 15 | 3 | 4 | 51 | 23 | +28 | 48 | Promotion to First Division |
| 2 | Vard | 22 | 14 | 4 | 4 | 56 | 23 | +33 | 46 | |
| 3 | Randaberg | 22 | 13 | 2 | 7 | 51 | 33 | +18 | 41 | |
| 4 | Jerv | 22 | 9 | 6 | 7 | 47 | 37 | +10 | 33 | |
| 5 | Ulf-Sandnes | 22 | 8 | 7 | 7 | 42 | 30 | +12 | 31 | |
| 6 | Ålgård | 22 | 8 | 5 | 9 | 31 | 39 | −8 | 29 | |
| 7 | Donn | 22 | 8 | 4 | 10 | 40 | 44 | −4 | 28 | |
| 8 | Skjold | 22 | 6 | 10 | 6 | 30 | 34 | −4 | 28 | |
| 9 | Figgjo | 22 | 6 | 6 | 10 | 25 | 40 | −15 | 24 | |
| 10 | Klepp (R) | 22 | 5 | 8 | 9 | 36 | 42 | −6 | 23 | Relegation to Third Division |
| 11 | Vidar (R) | 22 | 5 | 3 | 14 | 28 | 54 | −26 | 18 | Relegation to Third Division |
| 12 | Eiger (R) | 22 | 5 | 2 | 15 | 25 | 63 | −38 | 17 | Relegation to Third Division |

(P) Promoted; (R) Relegated

===== Group D =====
| Pos | Team | Pld | W | D | L | GF | GA | GD | Pts | Promotion or relegation |
|---|---|---|---|---|---|---|---|---|---|---|
| 1 | Fana (P) | 22 | 12 | 6 | 4 | 40 | 26 | +14 | 42 | Promotion to First Division |
| 2 | Åsane | 22 | 13 | 2 | 7 | 50 | 26 | +24 | 41 | |
| 3 | Volda | 22 | 10 | 9 | 3 | 39 | 20 | +19 | 39 | |
| 4 | Lyngbø | 22 | 9 | 8 | 5 | 28 | 19 | +9 | 35 | |
| 5 | Stranda | 22 | 8 | 8 | 6 | 28 | 24 | +4 | 32 | |
| 6 | Vadmyra | 22 | 7 | 9 | 6 | 21 | 13 | +8 | 30 | |
| 7 | Mercantile | 22 | 7 | 8 | 7 | 31 | 27 | +4 | 29 | |
| 8 | Brattvåg | 22 | 6 | 8 | 8 | 21 | 32 | −11 | 26 | |
| 9 | Førde | 22 | 8 | 1 | 13 | 17 | 45 | −28 | 25 | |
| 10 | Eid (R) | 22 | 5 | 8 | 9 | 33 | 39 | −6 | 23 | Relegation to Third Division |
| 11 | Hareid | 22 | 4 | 7 | 11 | 25 | 44 | −19 | 19 | Relegation to Third Division |
| 12 | Stryn (R) | 22 | 4 | 4 | 14 | 24 | 42 | −18 | 16 | Relegation to Third Division |

(P) Promoted; (R) Relegated

===== Group E =====
| Pos | Team | Pld | W | D | L | GF | GA | GD | Pts | Promotion or relegation |
|---|---|---|---|---|---|---|---|---|---|---|
| 1 | Surnadal (P) | 22 | 16 | 2 | 4 | 57 | 26 | +31 | 50 | Promotion to First Division |
| 2 | Åndalsnes | 22 | 14 | 4 | 4 | 47 | 26 | +21 | 46 | |
| 3 | Stjørdals/Blink | 22 | 12 | 4 | 6 | 47 | 35 | +12 | 40 | |
| 4 | Steinkjer | 22 | 10 | 4 | 8 | 35 | 29 | +6 | 34 | |
| 5 | Sunndal | 22 | 9 | 6 | 7 | 31 | 32 | −1 | 33 | |
| 6 | KIL/Hemne | 22 | 9 | 4 | 9 | 32 | 39 | −7 | 31 | |
| 7 | Melhus | 22 | 8 | 6 | 8 | 55 | 33 | +22 | 30 | |
| 8 | Nessegutten | 22 | 7 | 6 | 9 | 36 | 38 | −2 | 27 | |
| 9 | Alvdal | 22 | 7 | 5 | 10 | 30 | 38 | −8 | 26 | |
| 10 | Sverre (R) | 22 | 8 | 1 | 13 | 38 | 55 | −17 | 25 | Relegation to Third Division |
| 11 | Ready (R) | 22 | 5 | 2 | 15 | 30 | 52 | −22 | 17 | Relegation to Third Division |
| 12 | Clausenengen (R) | 22 | 3 | 4 | 15 | 26 | 61 | −35 | 13 | Relegation to Third Division |

(P) Promoted; (R) Relegated

===== Group F =====
| Pos | Team | Pld | W | D | L | GF | GA | GD | Pts | Promotion or relegation |
|---|---|---|---|---|---|---|---|---|---|---|
| 1 | Tromsdalen (P) | 22 | 16 | 3 | 3 | 60 | 16 | +44 | 51 | Promotion to First Division |
| 2 | Bodø/Glimt | 22 | 15 | 5 | 2 | 64 | 21 | +43 | 50 | |
| 3 | Narvik/Nor | 22 | 14 | 3 | 5 | 42 | 24 | +18 | 45 | |
| 4 | Stålkameratene | 22 | 12 | 3 | 7 | 45 | 32 | +13 | 39 | |
| 5 | Fauske/Sprint | 22 | 12 | 1 | 9 | 48 | 39 | +9 | 37 | |
| 6 | Alta | 22 | 10 | 5 | 7 | 32 | 31 | +1 | 35 | |
| 7 | Harstad | 22 | 9 | 3 | 10 | 40 | 34 | +6 | 30 | |
| 8 | Andenes | 22 | 6 | 5 | 11 | 47 | 49 | −2 | 23 | |
| 9 | Sandnessjøen (R) | 22 | 6 | 3 | 13 | 22 | 41 | −19 | 21 | Relegation to Third Division |
| 10 | Mosjøen (R) | 22 | 5 | 3 | 14 | 30 | 62 | −32 | 18 | Relegation to Third Division |
| 11 | Nordkjosbotn (R) | 22 | 6 | 0 | 16 | 25 | 57 | −32 | 18 | Relegation to Third Division |
| 12 | Luna (R) | 22 | 2 | 4 | 16 | 20 | 69 | −49 | 10 | Relegation to Third Division |

(P) Promoted; (R) Relegated

=== Norwegian Cup ===
==== Final ====
The match was played on 21 October 1990 at the Ullevaal Stadion in Oslo, and opposed two Tippeligaen sides; Fyllingen and Rosenborg. Rosenborg defeated Fyllingen 5–1 to claim the Norwegian Cup for a fifth time in their history.

21 October 1990
13:15 CET (UTC+1)

| Fyllingen | 1–5 | Rosenborg |
|---|---|---|
| Tengs 89' | Report | Løken 13', 59'; Sørloth 20'; Jakobsen 28'; Ingebrigtsen 67' |

Ullevaal Stadion, Oslo
Attendance: 28,000
Referee: Arild Haugstad (Faaberg)

== Women's football ==
=== League season ===
==== 1. divisjon ====
| Pos | Team | Pld | W | D | L | GF | GA | GD | Pts | Relegation |
|---|---|---|---|---|---|---|---|---|---|---|
| 1 | Sprint/Jeløy (C) | 18 | 16 | 1 | 1 | 65 | 14 | +51 | 49 | |
| 2 | Asker | 18 | 16 | 0 | 2 | 64 | 15 | +49 | 48 | |
| 3 | Klepp | 18 | 9 | 4 | 5 | 40 | 29 | +11 | 31 | |
| 4 | Trondheims-Ørn | 18 | 7 | 5 | 6 | 47 | 33 | +14 | 26 | |
| 5 | Setskog/Høland | 18 | 6 | 5 | 7 | 37 | 47 | −10 | 23 | |
| 6 | Skedsmo | 18 | 7 | 1 | 10 | 28 | 50 | −22 | 22 | |
| 7 | BUL | 18 | 5 | 3 | 10 | 29 | 50 | −21 | 18 | |
| 8 | Bøler | 18 | 3 | 7 | 8 | 19 | 35 | −16 | 16 | |
| 9 | Fløya (R) | 18 | 2 | 6 | 10 | 25 | 52 | −27 | 12 | Relegation to Second Division |
| 10 | Jardar (R) | 18 | 2 | 2 | 14 | 22 | 51 | −29 | 8 | Relegation to Second Division |

(C) Champions; (R) Relegated

=== Norwegian Women's Cup ===
==== Final ====
Asker won 5–1 against Sprint/Jeløy.

- Asker 5–1 Sprint/Jeløy

== UEFA competitions ==
=== European Cup ===
==== First round ====
| Team 1 | Agg. | Team 2 | 1st leg | 2nd leg |
|---|---|---|---|---|
| Lillestrøm (Norway) | 1–3 | (Belgium) Club Brugge | 1–1 | 0–2 |

=== European Cup Winners' Cup ===
==== First round ====
| Team 1 | Agg. | Team 2 | 1st leg | 2nd leg |
|---|---|---|---|---|
| Viking FK (Norway) | 0–5 | (Belgium) Liège | 0–2 | 0–3 |

=== UEFA Cup ===
==== First round ====
| Team 1 | Agg. | Team 2 | 1st leg | 2nd leg |
|---|---|---|---|---|
| Chornomorets Odessa (Soviet Union) | 4–3 | (Norway) Rosenborg | 3–1 (Report) | 1–2 (Report) |
