= Vegard Skogheim =

Norwegian footballer (born 1966)

Personal information
- Date of birth: 28 April 1966 (age 60)
- Place of birth: Hamar, Norway
- Height: 1.74 m (5 ft 9 in)
- Position: Midfielder

Team information
- Current team: HamKam (scout)

Senior career*
Years	Team	Apps	(Gls)
1983–1988	HamKam	112	(19)
1988–1989	Werder Bremen	3	(0)
1990–1995	HamKam	122	(24)
1995–1998	Viking	60	(12)
1999–2000	HamKam	29	(11)
Total		326	(66)

International career
1982	Norway U-16	3	(1)
1982–1983	Norway U-19	8	(0)
1984–1987	Norway U-21	18	(1)
1984–1992	Norway	13	(1)

Managerial career
- 2001: Brumunddal
- 2002: Lillehammer
- 2003–2006: Kongsvinger
- 2007–2009: HamKam (assistant)
- 2009–2014: HamKam
- 2015–2018: Ullensaker/Kisa
- 2020–2022: Asker
- 2023–: HamKam (scout)
- * Club domestic league appearances and goals

Vegard Skogheim (born 28 April 1966) is a Norwegian football coach and former player who played as a midfielder.

During his active career, he played for HamKam, Werder Bremen and Viking. He had a total of 197 matches and 36 goals in the Norwegian Premier League. Skogheim played 13 matches for the Norway national football team and scored a goal.

As a coach, he has been in charge of Lillehammer and Brumunddal, and has been managing Kongsvinger with success, securing promotion from Second Division in 2003, and almost repeating the feat in First Division in 2004. During winter 2006, Kongsvinger informed him, they would not sign him up for another contract, and thus he made his exit, joining former Lillestrøm coach Arne Erlandsen in his old club HamKam on 13 November 2006. Here, he acted as a player developer and assistant coach. On 11 June 2009, Skogheim was appointed new head coach of HamKam. He resigned after three games of the 2014 Norwegian First Division.

After Asker was relegated from the 2022 2. divisjon, Skogheim was sacked as head coach. He returned to Hamkam as a scout.

== Career statistics ==
=== Club ===
Appearances and goals by club, season and competition
Club	Season	League			Cup		Continental		Other		Total	
Club	Season	Division	Apps	Goals	Apps	Goals	Apps	Goals	Apps	Goals	Apps	Goals
HamKam	1983	First Division	14	0	2	0	—		—		16	0
HamKam	1984	Second Division	22	4	4	2	—		2	1	28	7
HamKam	1985	Second Division	22	5	5	4	—		—		27	9
HamKam	1986	First Division	22	4	4	4	—		—		26	8
HamKam	1987	First Division	21	4	6	1	2 (Note: Appearances in play-offs)	0	—		29	5
HamKam	1988	Second Division	11	2	2	2	—		—		13	4
HamKam	Total		112	19	23	13	2	0	2	1	139	33
Werder Bremen	1988–89	Bundesliga	3	0	1	0	1	0	0	0	5	0
HamKam	1990	Second Division	21	5	3	1	—		—		24	6
HamKam	1991	First Division	21	3	4	1	—		—		25	4
HamKam	1992	Tippeligaen	21	4	2	1	—		2	0	25	5
HamKam	1993	Tippeligaen	17	7	5	1	—		—		22	8
HamKam	1994	Tippeligaen	19	3	3	0	—		—		22	3
HamKam	1995	Tippeligaen	23	2	3	2	—		—		26	4
HamKam	Total		122	24	20	6	0	0	2	0	144	30
Viking	1996	Tippeligaen	16	1	4	1	—		—		20	2
Viking	1997	Tippeligaen	25	6	6	6	4	2	—		35	14
Viking	1998	Tippeligaen	19	5	2	0	—		—		21	5
Viking	Total		60	12	12	7	4	2	0	0	76	21
HamKam	1999	2. divisjon	12	7	0	0	—		1	1	13	8
HamKam	2000	First Division	17	4	3	0	—		—		20	4
HamKam	Total		29	11	3	0	0	0	1	1	33	12
Career total			326	66	59	26	7	2	5	2	397	96

=== International ===
Appearances and goals by national team and year
National team	Year	Apps	Goals
Norway	1984	1	0
Norway	1985	0	0
Norway	1986	4	1
Norway	1987	7	0
Norway	1992	1	0
Total		13	1

Scores and results list Norway's goal tally first, score column indicates score after each Skogheim goal.

List of international goals scored by Vegard Skogheim
No.	Date	Venue	Opponent	Score	Result	Competition
1	26 February 1986	Grenada National Stadium, Saint-George's, Grenada	Grenada	2–1	2–1	Friendly
