= 1990 Norwegian Second Division =

2. divisjon
- Season: 1990
- Champions: Sogndal; Lyn
- Promoted: Sogndal; Lyn
- Relegated: Os; Stord; Faaberg; Skarp; Namsos; Sprint Jeløy
- Matches played: 264
- Goals scored: 710 (2.69 per match)

The 1990 2. divisjon was a Norwegian second-tier football league season. This was the last season the second tier was named 2. divisjon. From the 1991 season and onwards, the name of the second level of the Norwegian football league system has been 1. divisjon.

The league was contested by 24 teams, divided into two groups; A and B. The winners of group A and B were promoted to the 1991 Tippeligaen. The second placed teams met the 10th position finisher in the Tippeligaen in a qualification round where the winner was promoted to Tippeligaen. The bottom three teams inn both groups were relegated to the new 2. divisjon.

== Overview ==
=== Summary ===
Sogndal won group A with 48 points and Lyn won group B with 45 points. Both teams promoted to the 1991 Tippeligaen. The second-placed teams, Bryne and Eik met Lillestrøm in the promotion play-offs. Lillestrøm won the qualification and remained in the Tippeligaen.

== Tables ==
=== Group A ===
Pos	Team	Pld	W	D	L	GF	GA	GD	Pts	Promotion, qualification or relegation
1	Sogndal (C, P)	22	15	3	4	42	23	+19	48	Promotion to Tippeligaen
2	Bryne	22	14	2	6	34	20	+14	44	Qualification for the promotion play-offs
3	HamKam	22	13	4	5	53	28	+25	43	
4	Strømmen	22	12	5	5	40	13	+27	41	
5	Aalesund	22	11	4	7	40	31	+9	37	
6	Djerv 1919	22	9	5	8	23	22	+1	32	
7	Hødd	22	5	8	9	27	34	−7	23	
8	Kristiansund	22	5	7	10	22	37	−15	22	
9	Frigg	22	5	5	12	23	43	−20	20	
10	Os (R)	22	4	7	11	18	35	−17	19	Relegation to Second Division
11	Stord (R)	22	4	6	12	22	38	−16	18	Relegation to Second Division
12	Faaberg (R)	22	3	8	11	16	36	−20	17	Relegation to Second Division

Source: rsssf.no
Rules for classification: 1) points; 2) goal difference; 3) number of goals scored.
(C) Champions; (P) Promoted; (R) Relegated

=== Group B ===
Pos	Team	Pld	W	D	L	GF	GA	GD	Pts	Promotion, qualification or relegation
1	Lyn (C, P)	22	14	3	5	50	23	+27	45	Promotion to Tippeligaen
2	Eik	22	14	3	5	45	22	+23	45	Qualification for the promotion play-offs
3	Mjøndalen	22	13	4	5	38	23	+15	43	
4	Mjølner	22	10	8	4	29	21	+8	38	
5	Strindheim	22	11	2	9	30	26	+4	35	
6	Sandefjord BK	22	9	5	8	24	22	+2	32	
7	Råde	22	6	5	11	24	31	−7	23	
8	Fredrikstad	22	5	8	9	18	33	−15	23	
9	Pors	22	6	4	12	25	36	−11	22	
10	Skarp (R)	22	5	7	10	19	34	−15	22	Relegation to Second Division
11	Namsos (R)	22	5	5	12	29	40	−11	20	Relegation to Second Division
12	Sprint-Jeløy (R)	22	4	6	12	19	39	−20	18	Relegation to Second Division

Source: rsssf.no
Rules for classification: 1) points; 2) goal difference; 3) number of goals scored.
(C) Champions; (P) Promoted; (R) Relegated

== Promotion play-offs ==
=== Results ===
- Bryne – Eik 5–1
- Eik – Lillestrøm 1–3
- Lillestrøm – Bryne 2–0

Lillestrøm won the qualification round and remained in the Tippeligaen.

=== Play-off table ===
Pos	Team	Pld	W	D	L	GF	GA	GD	Pts	Promotion or relegation
1	Lillestrøm (O)	2	2	0	0	5	1	+4	4	Remained in the Tippeligaen
2	Bryne	2	1	0	1	5	3	+2	2	Remained in the First Division
3	Eik	2	0	0	2	2	8	−6	0	Remained in the First Division

Source: rsssf.no
Rules for classification: 1) points; 2) goal difference; 3) number of goals scored.
(O) Play-off winners

== Top goalscorers ==
Group A and B combined:

- 18 goals:

- Tom Fodstad, Lyn

- 16 goals:

- Rune Sunde, Aalesund

- 14 goals:

- Per Ivar Fornes, Mjøndalen

- 12 goals:

- Roger Iversen, Frigg and Sandefjord
- Stig Nordheim, Bryne

- 11 goals:

- Stein Berg Johansen, Mjølner
- Arve Sundby, Eik

- 10 goals:

- Trond Sundby, Lyn

- 9 goals:

- Knut Aga, Strømmen
- Hans O. Berge, Pors
- Stig Bjørnø, Eik
- Geir Hasund, Hødd
- Frode Myklebust, Aalesund
- Ståle Solbakken, Hamkam

- 8 goals:

- Simen Agdestein, Lyn
- Frode Frotveit, Os
- Stig Hasselvold, Strindheim
- Arve Svorkmo, Hamkam
- Roger Wernersen, Mjøndalen
