= List of Stabæk Fotball seasons =

This is a list of seasons played by Stabæk Fotball in Norwegian and European football from 1987 to the most recent completed season. It details the club's achievements in major competitions, and the top scorers for some season. The statistics is up to date as of the end of the 2022 season.

Season	League											Cup	Europe	Top goalscorer		Ref
Season	Tier	Division (Grp.)	P	W	D	L	GF	GA	Pts	Pos.	Att.	Cup	Europe	Name	Goals	Ref
1987	5	5. divisjon	18	14	1	3	53	11	29	↑ 1st	—	DNP				
1988	4	4. divisjon (B)	22	10	5	7	34	20	35	4th	—	1QR				
1989	4	4. divisjon (B)	22	13	6	3	45	19	45	2nd	—	1QR				
1990	4	4. divisjon (B)	22	13	4	5	48	23	43	↑ 1st	—	1QR				
1991	3	2. divisjon (B)	22	12	5	5	39	19	41	2nd	—	1R				
1992	3	2. divisjon (B)	22	12	7	3	60	23	43	3rd	—	2R				
1993	3	2. divisjon (C)	22	16	2	4	51	26	50	↑ 1st	—	2R				
1994	2	1. divisjon (1)	22	13	3	6	43	32	42	↑ 2nd	—	3R				
1995	1	Tippeligaen	26	9	6	11	36	40	33	9th	3,300	4R				
1996	1	Tippeligaen	26	9	9	8	47	45	36	6th	3,100	QF		Petter Belsvik	18	
1997	1	Tippeligaen	26	13	4	9	33	35	43	5th	3,411	QF	UEFA Intertoto Cup – Group stage			
1998	1	Tippeligaen	26	16	5	5	63	29	53	3rd	3,397	Winners	UEFA Intertoto Cup – First round	Petter Belsvik	19	
1999	1	Tippeligaen	26	14	4	8	58	49	46	5th	3,767	4R	UEFA Cup – First round			
2000	1	Tippeligaen	26	12	6	8	59	33	42	5th	3,769	3R	UEFA Intertoto Cup – Second round	Christian Michelsen	11	
2001	1	Tippeligaen	26	14	3	9	45	39	45	4th	4,228	4R		Tryggvi Guðmundsson	7	
2002	1	Tippeligaen	26	12	6	8	48	34	42	5th	3,750	3R	UEFA Cup – First round	Tryggvi Guðmundsson	16	
2003	1	Tippeligaen	26	11	9	6	51	35	42	3rd	4,334	4R		Thomas Finstad	10	
2004	1	Tippeligaen	26	7	6	13	25	40	27	↓ 13th	4,270	SF	UEFA Cup – First round	Thomas Finstad; Mads Jørgensen; Tom Stenvoll	3	
2005	2	1. divisjon	30	20	7	3	63	23	67	↑ 1st	—	QF		Daniel Nannskog	27	
2006	1	Tippeligaen	26	10	9	7	53	36	39	5th	5,061	3R		Daniel Nannskog	19	
2007	1	Tippeligaen	26	14	6	6	53	38	48	2nd	5,570	SF		Daniel Nannskog	19	
2008	1	Tippeligaen	26	16	6	4	58	24	54	1st	5,833	Final	UEFA Cup – Second qualifying round	Daniel Nannskog	16	
2009	1	Tippeligaen	30	15	8	7	52	34	53	3rd	9,472	QF	UEFA Champions League – Third qualifying round UEFA Europa League – Play-off round	Daniel Nannskog	15	
2010	1	Tippeligaen	30	11	6	13	46	47	39	12th	8,149	3R	UEFA Europa League – Second qualifying round	Veigar Páll Gunnarsson	10	
2011	1	Tippeligaen	30	11	6	13	44	50	39	10th	7,411	3R		Pálmi Rafn Pálmason	8	
2012	1	Tippeligaen	30	5	2	23	25	69	17	↓ 16th	3,903	3R	UEFA Europa League – First qualifying round	Franck Boli; Fredrik Brustad	5	
2013	2	1. divisjon	30	14	10	6	51	46	52	↑ 2nd	2,318	4R		Mads Stokkelien	13	
2014	1	Tippeligaen	30	11	6	13	44	52	39	9th	3,835	SF		Franck Boli	13	
2015	1	Tippeligaen	30	17	5	8	54	43	56	3rd	3,880	SF		Adama Diomande	17	
2016	1	Tippeligaen	30	8	7	15	35	42	31	14th	3,809	4R	UEFA Europa League – First qualifying round	5 players	4	
2017	1	Eliteserien	30	10	9	11	46	50	39	9th	3,960	QF		Ohi Omoijuanfo	17	
2018	1	Eliteserien	30	6	11	13	37	50	29	14th	3,656	3R		Franck Boli	17	
2019	1	Eliteserien	30	10	10	10	38	36	40	8th	3,653	4R		Franck Boli; Ola Brynhildsen; Kasper Junker	6	
2020	1	Eliteserien	30	9	12	9	41	45	39	8th	212	Cancelled		Oliver Edvardsen	6	
2021	1	Eliteserien	30	6	7	17	35	62	25	↓ 15th	1,679	3R		Oliver Edvardsen	7	
2022	2	1. divisjon	30	16	10	4	62	28	58	↑ 2nd	2,190	SF		Gift Orban	16	
