= 1991 Norwegian First Division =

1. divisjon
- Season: 1991
- Promoted: Mjøndalen; Ham-Kam
- Relegated: Kristiansund; Frigg; Surnadal; Mjølner; Råde; Sandefjord
- Matches played: 264
- Goals scored: 810 (3.07 per match)

The 1991 1. divisjon, Norway's second-tier football league, began play on 28 April 1991 and ended on 6 October 1991. The league was contested by 24 teams, divided in two groups and the winner of each group won promotion to Tippeligaen, while the runners-up played a promotion-playoff against the 10th placed team in the 1991 Tippeligaen. The bottom three teams were relegated to the 2. divisjon.

Mjøndalen and Ham-Kam won promotion to Tippeligaen, while Kristiansund, Frigg, Surnadal, Mjølner, Råde and Sandefjord was relegated to the 2. divisjon.

== Tables ==
=== Group A ===
Pos	Team	Pld	W	D	L	GF	GA	GD	Pts	Promotion, qualification or relegation
1	Mjøndalen (C, P)	22	17	2	3	55	19	+36	53	Promotion to Tippeligaen
2	Bryne	22	14	3	5	31	16	+15	45	Qualification for the promotion play-offs
3	VIF Fotball	22	13	1	8	31	26	+5	40	
4	Hødd	22	9	6	7	41	31	+10	33	
5	Aalesund	22	9	6	7	31	24	+7	33	
6	Fana	22	8	8	6	32	37	−5	32	
7	Strømmen	22	9	3	10	33	31	+2	30	
8	Djerv 1919	22	8	3	11	39	37	+2	27	
9	Haugar	22	6	7	9	34	40	−6	25	
10	Kristiansund (R)	22	7	4	11	19	35	−16	25	Relegation to Second Division
11	Frigg (R)	22	4	6	12	21	37	−16	18	Relegation to Second Division
12	Surnadal (R)	22	2	3	17	20	54	−34	9	Relegation to Second Division

Source: nifs.no
Rules for classification: 1) points; 2) goal difference; 3) number of goals scored.
(C) Champions; (P) Promoted; (R) Relegated

=== Group B ===
Pos	Team	Pld	W	D	L	GF	GA	GD	Pts	Promotion, qualification or relegation
1	HamKam (C, P)	22	15	6	1	64	22	+42	51	Promotion to Tippeligaen
2	Strindheim	22	13	3	6	37	24	+13	42	Qualification for the promotion play-offs
3	Fredrikstad	22	12	4	6	47	27	+20	40	
4	Eik-Tønsberg	22	11	4	7	44	29	+15	37	
5	Tromsdalen	22	10	3	9	32	28	+4	33	
6	Elverum	22	10	2	10	38	37	+1	32	
7	Drøbak/Frogn	22	9	5	8	36	35	+1	32	
8	Moss	22	9	4	9	32	30	+2	31	
9	Pors	22	6	6	10	23	50	−27	24	
10	Mjølner (R)	22	6	4	12	27	47	−20	22	Relegation to Second Division
11	Råde (R)	22	3	6	13	19	45	−26	15	Relegation to Second Division
12	Sandefjord BK (R)	22	2	5	15	24	49	−25	11	Relegation to Second Division

Source: nifs.no
Rules for classification: 1) points; 2) goal difference; 3) number of goals scored.
(C) Champions; (P) Promoted; (R) Relegated

== Promotion play-offs ==
=== Results ===
- Strindheim – Bryne 0–2
- Brann – Strindheim 1–0
- Bryne – Brann 0–1

Brann won the qualification round and was promoted to the 1992 Tippeligaen.

=== Play-off table ===
Pos	Team	Pld	W	D	L	GF	GA	GD	Pts	Promotion or relegation
1	Brann (O)	2	2	0	0	2	0	+2	6	Remained in Tippeligaen
2	Bryne	2	1	0	1	2	1	+1	3	Remained in First Division
3	Strindheim	2	0	0	2	0	3	−3	0	Remained in First Division

Source: rsssf.no
Rules for classification: 1) points; 2) goal difference; 3) number of goals scored.
(O) Play-off winners

== Top scorers Group A and B ==
Goalscorers	Team	Goals
(Norway) Ole Petter Skonnord	Elverum	17
(Norway) Arve Svorkmo	HamKam	15
(Norway) Ståle Solbakken	HamKam	14
(Norway) Per Ivar Fornes	Mjøndalen	12
(Norway) Geir Hasund	Hødd	12
(Norway) Ståle Killie	Mjølner	12
(Norway) Thor Helge Fagernes	Eik-Tønsberg	11
(Norway) Stein Arne Ingelstad	HamKam	11
(Norway) Erik Nymoen	Frigg	11
(Norway) Terje Pedersen	Moss	11
(Norway) Rolf Bredal	Drøbak/Frogn	10
(Norway) Are Christensen	Vålerengen	10
(Norway) Stig Otto Jørgensen	Tromsdalen	10
(Norway) Per Terje Markussen	Mjøndalen	10
(Norway) Sander Solberg	Fredrikstad	10
(Norway) Erling Ytterland	HamKam	10
(Norway) Tom Freddy Aune	Fredrikstad	9
(Norway) Tommy Hansen	Mjøndalen	9
(Norway) Morten Hanssen	Fredrikstad	9
(Norway) Mons Ivar Mjelde	Bryne	9
(Norway) Kai Birger Myrold	Aalesund	9
(Norway) Arve Sundby	Eik-Tønsberg	9

== See also ==
- 1991 Tippeligaen
- 1991 2. divisjon
