= Stein Arne Ingelstad =

Norwegian footballer

Personal information
- Date of birth: 25 July 1970 (age 56)
- Position: Forward

Youth career
- Gvarv
- 1987: HamKam

Senior career*
Years	Team	Apps	(Gls)
–1987	Gvarv		
1988–1994	HamKam		
1995	Lillestrøm	14	(1)
1996–1997	Kongsvinger	38	(5)
1998	HamKam	17	(3)

International career
1988	Norway U18	1	(0)
1989	Norway U20	4	(0)
1990–1991	Norway U21	4	(0)

Managerial career
- 1999–2000: HamKam (assistant)
- 2000: HamKam (caretaker)
- 2015–2016: HamKam (managing director)
- * Club domestic league appearances and goals

Stein Arne Ingelstad (born 25 July 1970) is a retired Norwegian football striker. He played in Eliteserien from 1992 through 1997 for three different clubs. Spending most of his career in HamKam, he also served in the same club as a coach, board member and administrator.

== Early career ==
Hailing from Gvarv, Ingelstad played on the senior team of Gvarv IL, among others alongside Dag Eilev Fagermo. His father came from the Hamar area, and tried to arrange a trial with Hamarkameratene. In the summer of 1987, Ingelstad moved to Hamar, started attending Hamar Cathedral School and played for Hamkam's junior team. He was drafted into the first team in 1988. Here, he was noted in June 1988 when he scored back-to-back goals against Mjøndalen and Bodø/Glimt.

Ingelstad represented Norway as a youth international, being selected for the first time in the summer of 1988, and again for the 1989 FIFA World Youth Championship.

== Elite career ==
Ingelstad scored 11 goals in the 1991 1. divisjon, as Hamkam were promoted to the top tier. In Ingelstad's first Eliteserien season, 1992, Hamkam struggled and barely survived the relegation playoff. Ingelstad was approached for a transfer by Odds BK and Fredrikstad FK. While Odd and Fredrikstad were both relegated to the third tier in 1992, the talks with Fredrikstad were serious, but Ingelstad stayed in Hamkam, mainly for private reasons.

After a goalless period in the Eliteserien from September 1992, Ingelstad hit his stride in June 1993 when scoring both goals in a victory against Hedmark rivals Kongsvinger. Ingelstad "had been annoyed" with manager Peter Engelbrektsson who previously played him as a winger; he was now being played as a striker. A week later, he scored two goals again; the only goals of the match as Hamkam beat Tromsø. After the league took a two-week summer break, Ingelstad once again scored Hamkam's only goal, this time in an away victory against Fyllingen.

Before the 1994 season was over, he signed for Eliteserien runners-up Lillestrøm SK. The clubs agreed to value Ingelstad at 250,000 kr, with Kent Karlsen moving the opposite way. In addition to his 7 Hamkam goals in 1994, Ingelstad was noted for his physical shape at the time, squatting 157.5 kg and beating Lillestrøm's perennial top performer, Frode Grodås, in strength tests. Ingelstad later stated that his trying to keep up with Grodås became his undoing. Said Ingelstad; "The misery started at Åråsen. I went for extra tough passes in the gym to match Frode Grodås. I achieved that, but the knees could not bear the load".

After only one league goal for Lillestrøm in 1995, Ingelstad was set on leaving. As quoted by Glåmdalen, "I was told to run along the line all the way down to the corner flag. It entailed lots of running, and I could not adapt". The competition between forwards in Lillestrøm was too stiff, especially after they bought Frank Strandli. Ingelstad sought a club where he could play in the striker position, and was brought by Hallvar Thoresen and Gunnar Martin Kjenner to a trial in the Netherlands. He spent a week in Fortuna Sittard before returning home. However, Ingelstad returned to Hedmark and signed for Kongsvinger IL ahead of the 1996 season. The transfer was eased by an earlier agreement when Lillestrøm bought Geir Frigård from Kongsvinger, stipulating that Lillestrøm should sell certain players for "far below market prices".

== Later career and coaching ==
The decision to not renew Ingelstad's contract in Kongsvinger was announced in September 1997. He returned to Hamkam, claiming that "it is like coming home", as he would try to help Hamkam win promotion from the 1998 1. divisjon. However, the team found themselves at the bottom of the table, and ended up being relegated to the third tier for the first time since 1967.

The year 1998 started with a meniscus surgery that turned inflamed. After the 1998 season, Ingelstad had to retire as a player, aged 28, because of multiple knee injuries. Taking up residence at Løten Municipality, he entered a position as assistant manager of Hamkam. He also had responsibility for the B team Hamkam 2. In June 2000, manager Conny Karlsson was hospitalized, and Ingelstad became acting manager. Wanting the permanent position as manager, Ingelstad lost confidence as Hamkam hired a new manager in the fall of 2000.

In 2015 he was elected as a board member of Hamkam and in the summer of 2015 he was employed as their new managing director. Having worked several years with sales in the pharmaceutical industry, Ingelstad vowed to make Hamkam an attractive team for audiences. At the time, Hamkam was lagging behind local league rivals Kongsvinger, Elverum and Brumunddal.

== Personal life ==
He married in 1998.
