= Kristian Skogsrud =

Norwegian footballer (born 1985)

Personal information
- Date of birth: 2 February 1985 (age 41)
- Place of birth: Tangen, Norway
- Height: 1.80 m (5 ft 11 in)
- Position: Midfielder

Team information
- Current team: Ottestad

Senior career*
Years	Team	Apps	(Gls)
2002–2006	Ham-Kam	4	(0)
2003	→ Oslo Øst (loan)		
2004–2005	→ Eidsvold Turn (loan)		
2007–2008	Eidsvold Turn		
2009–	Ottestad		
- * Club domestic league appearances and goals

Kristian Skogsrud (born 2 February 1985) is a Norwegian footballer who played as a midfielder for Ham-Kam in Tippeligaen.

He was born in Tangen in Stange Municipality and made his senior debut for Ham-Kam in the 1. divisjon match against Hønefoss on 27 October 2002. He joined the first team squad in 2003 and played two Norwegian Cup games and one league game that season, before he was loaned out to Oslo Øst. He then spent time on loan at Eidsvold Turn in 2004 and 2005. He returned to Ham-Kam in 2006, and played his only two Tippeligaen games. Ahead of the 2007 season he joined Eidsvold TF on a permanent basis, together with Pål Ekeberg Schjerve in a swap with Frode Bjørnevik. Ahead of the 2009 season he joined Ottestad IL.

When Vegar Bjerke got injured in 2010, Ham-Kam's head coach Vegard Skogheim approached Ottestad to loan Skogsrud, but Skogsrud stated that he had lost his motivation to play football at a professional level.
