= Tom Fodstad =

Norwegian footballer

Personal information
- Date of birth: 11 April 1966 (age 60)
- Height: 1.75 m (5 ft 9 in)
- Position: Forward

Youth career
- Eidsvold Turn

Senior career*
Years	Team	Apps	(Gls)
–1984	Eidsvold Turn		
1985−1989	HamKam		
1990−1991	Lyn	39	(25)
1992–1994	Stabæk	63	(52)
1995–1996	Heggedal		

International career
1982	Norway U16	1	(0)
1983	Norway U19	1	(0)
1986	Norway U21	2	(1)

Managerial career
- 2000: Lyn (youth)
- 2001–: Bærum (assistant)
- * Club domestic league appearances and goals

Tom Fodstad (born 11 April 1966) is a Norwegian retired football striker. He played first-tier football for HamKam and Lyn and was capped for Norway youth and under-21 sides.

== Career ==
Playing for Eidsvold TF he joined HamKam ahead of the 1985 season. In the spring of 1986, he was a russ, graduating from Hamar Cathedral School. At the same time he scored his first goal in the highest division in May 1986. As Hamkam recorded their first ever away victory against Lillestrøm, Fodstad also had the assist on Hamkam's other goal, in that the goalkeeper let his shot go to a rebound. A week later, he scored again, as Hamkam beat Kongsvinger 2–1 in the Hedmark derby. Days later, he played for Norway U21 and scored in a near-victory over Sweden U21. Norway had never beat their neighbours' U21 team before, but looked to do so as Fodstad secured a 3–2 lead following earlier goals by Hans Eskilsson, Jan Åge Fjørtoft, Gunnar Halle and Anders Limpar. However, Stefan Rehn scored a late equalizer, denying Norway the win.

In the 1987 league opener, Fodstad scored the only goal in Hamkam's match against Bryne. This was incidentally the 8000th goal in Norway's highest league since the inception of a nationwide league in 1963. Hamkam nonetheless ended the 1987 Norwegian First Division in the relegation playoffs, where the team succumbed to Djerv 1919 and were relegated to the second tier. In 1988, Hamkam reached the playoffs for a possible re-promotion, but lost to Start.

In 1989, Fodstad notably scored twice and had an assist in a 7–0 thrashing of Bodø/Glimt, which yet again secured Hamkam a place in the playoffs to the first tier. Hamkam did not succeed in these playoffs either. It was speculated that Fodstad wanted to leave after the season, with the player assessing the possibility at 90%.

Fodstad decided to move on to Lyn in 1990, another team on the second tier, but with clear promotion ambitions. In the 1990 2. divisjon, Fodstad scored 18 goals and became the league's top goalscorer. His last goal came in the ultimate game of the season, securing one point against Sprint/Jeløy, which turned out to be enough for Lyn to win promotion to the 1991 Eliteserien. The manager Erling Hokstad stated that Fodstad's success stemmed from being a goalscorer by birth, but also his considerable work on minute details in training.

In 1991, Lyn anticipated that Fodstad would score somewhat less goals, but nonetheless relied on his abilities as a striker. The goals were fewer in the highest league, and Fodstad's co-striker Simen Agdestein was injured. In the middle of the season, Lyn lost some of their confidence in Fodstad and recruited Janusz Kudyba from Poland. By August 1991, however, Kudyba had yet to break through in Norwegian football, whereas Fodstad was praised by VG after scoring against Strømsgodset. Fodstad was particularly noted for scoring 4 goals against Viking in September 1991, at the same time as Viking managed to clinch the Eliteserien title.

Following 7 goals in 20 games during the 1991 Eliteserien season, Fodstad went on to Stabæk. Playing on the third tier, Stabæk chased an unprecedented climb to the first tier, recruiting three players from Lyn and one from Hamkam. Manager Stig Mathisen was not impressed, "actually scared", by Fodstad's form in the first weeks, but was reassured by two goals in a 5–0 victory against Sandefjord BK in the last friendly before the league opener. Stabæk achieved back-to-back promotions from the 1993 2. divisjon and the 1994 1. divisjon. In the summer of 1994, Fodstad led the goalscoring table in the 1. divisjon (jointly with Tommy Sylte) with 8 goals in 11 matches. Fodstad did not follow Stabæk into the 1995 Eliteserien, though, instead opting to join minnows Heggedal IL. In 1998, he was inducted as the second player in Stabæk's Hall of Fame, after Lars Joachim Grimstad.

== Post-playing career ==
In 1997, he conducted a trip around the world together with his wife Beate and his two children. They settled at Blommenholm in Bærum. His son Markus Fodstad became a Bærum SK player, and later worked with marketing in Bodø/Glimt.

Fodstad started working with sales in the Football Association of Norway, and became known when his department distributed the thousands of tickets allocated to Norwegian fans during the Euro 2000. He later became director of marketing.

In 2000, Fodstad also coached the junior team of Lyn. Ahead of the 2001 season, Fodstad was hired as assistant coach under Tor Ole Skullerud for Bærum SK. He also held other roles in the club.
