= 1983 Norwegian First Division =

39th season of top-tier football league in Norway

1. divisjon
- Season: 1983
- Dates: 24 April – 9 October
- Champions: Vålerengen; 3rd title
- Relegated: Brann; Mjøndalen; HamKam
- European Cup: Vålerengen
- Cup Winners' Cup: Moss
- UEFA Cup: Lillestrøm
- Matches played: 132
- Goals scored: 400 (3.03 per match)
- Top goalscorer: Olav Nysæter (14 goals)
- Biggest home win: Brann 9–2 Viking (9 October 1983)
- Biggest away win: HamKam 0–5 Eik (31 July 1983)
- Highest scoring: Brann 9–2 Viking (9 October 1983)
- Longest winning run: Vålerengen (5 games)
- Longest unbeaten run: Vålerengen (12 games)
- Longest winless run: Bryne; Rosenborg (10 games)
- Longest losing run: HamKam (5 games)
- Highest attendance: 17,500; Rosenborg 2–3 Start (16 May 1983)
- Lowest attendance: 802; HamKam 0–2 Start (25 September 1983)
- Average attendance: 5,526 ▲20.9%

The 1983 1. divisjon was the 39th completed season of top division football in Norway.

== Overview ==
22 games were played with 2 points given for wins and 1 for draws. Number eleven and twelve were relegated. The winners of the two groups of the 2. divisjon were promoted, as well as the winner of a series of play-off matches between number ten in the 1. divisjon and the two second-placed teams in the two groups of the 2. divisjon.

Vålerengen won the championship, their third title.

== Teams and locations ==
Note: Table lists in alphabetical order.

Team	Ap.	Location	Stadium
Brann	29	Bergen	Brann Stadion
Bryne	8	Bryne	Bryne Stadion
Eik	6	Tønsberg	Tønsberg Gressbane
Hamarkameratene	12	Hamar	Briskeby
Kongsvinger	1	Kongsvinger	Gjemselund Stadion
Lillestrøm	20	Lillestrøm	Åråsen Stadion
Mjøndalen	14	Mjøndalen	Nedre Eiker Stadion
Moss	10	Moss	Melløs Stadion
Rosenborg	20	Trondheim	Lerkendal Stadion
Start	16	Kristiansand	Kristiansand Stadion
Vålerengen	28	Oslo	Bislett Stadion
Viking	36	Stavanger	Stavanger Stadion

== League table ==
Pos	Team	Pld	W	D	L	GF	GA	GD	Pts	Qualification or relegation
1	Vålerengen (C)	22	12	7	3	38	17	+21	31	Qualification for the European Cup first round
2	Lillestrøm	22	10	8	4	40	28	+12	28	Qualification for the UEFA Cup first round
3	Start	22	10	7	5	47	27	+20	27	
4	Moss	22	8	8	6	31	34	−3	24	Qualification for the Cup Winners' Cup first round
5	Eik	22	9	5	8	34	32	+2	23	
6	Viking	22	8	6	8	31	34	−3	22	
7	Rosenborg	22	7	7	8	41	38	+3	21	
8	Bryne	22	7	7	8	31	32	−1	21	
9	Kongsvinger	22	7	6	9	44	42	+2	20	
10	Brann (R)	22	7	6	9	31	32	−1	20	Qualification for the relegation play-offs
11	Mjøndalen (R)	22	5	7	10	17	34	−17	17	Relegation to Second Division
12	Hamarkameratene (R)	22	3	4	15	15	50	−35	10	Relegation to Second Division

Source: NIFS
Rules for classification: 1) points; 2) goal difference; 3) number of goals scored.
(C) Champions; (R) Relegated

== Results ==
Home \ Away	BRA	BRY	EIK	HAM	KON	LIL	MIF	MOS	ROS	IKS	VIK	VÅL
Brann	—	0–0	0–0	2–1	2–0	4–0	1–0	0–2	0–0	0–2	9–2	1–1
Bryne	0–2	—	0–1	1–1	3–2	1–2	5–1	3–2	1–5	2–2	2–1	0–0
Eik	2–2	3–0	—	0–0	4–2	0–3	3–1	0–3	3–1	1–2	1–0	2–0
Hamarkameratene	2–0	0–2	0–5	—	2–1	0–4	1–1	0–1	0–2	0–2	2–3	1–3
Kongsvinger	5–1	2–2	2–1	0–3	—	2–2	0–2	6–1	4–2	2–1	1–2	0–3
Lillestrøm	3–1	2–0	3–1	1–0	1–1	—	3–0	4–0	3–1	1–4	1–1	0–0
Mjøndalen	3–0	0–3	0–0	3–1	0–0	2–2	—	0–0	0–0	0–5	0–0	0–2
Moss	1–1	2–2	1–1	0–0	3–2	1–1	1–0	—	0–2	2–1	2–0	2–1
Rosenborg	3–1	2–2	2–5	4–0	3–3	3–0	1–2	2–2	—	2–3	1–1	2–3
Start	1–0	0–2	4–0	6–0	2–6	1–1	4–0	2–2	1–1	—	1–2	2–2
Viking	2–0	1–0	3–1	4–1	2–3	2–2	1–2	2–1	1–2	1–1	—	0–0
Vålerengen	2–4	1–0	3–0	5–0	0–0	3–1	1–0	4–2	3–0	0–0	1–0	—

Source: nifs.no (in Norwegian)
Legend: Blue = home team win; Yellow = draw; Red = away team win.

== Relegation play-offs ==
The qualification play-off matches were contested between Brann (10th in the 1. divisjon), Pors (2nd in the 2. divisjon - Group A), and Strindheim (2nd in the 2. divisjon - Group B). Strindheim won and were promoted to the 1. divisjon.

Results

- Strindheim 0–0 Brann
- Pors 1–2 Strindheim
- Brann 1–1 Pors

Pos	Team	Pld	W	D	L	GF	GA	GD	Pts	Promotion or relegation
1	Strindheim (O, P)	2	1	1	0	2	1	+1	3	Promotion to First Division
2	Brann (R)	2	0	2	0	1	1	0	2	Relegation to Second Division
3	Pors	2	0	1	1	2	3	−1	1	Remained in 2. divisjon

Source: rsssf.no
(O) Play-off winners; (P) Promoted; (R) Relegated

== Season statistics ==
=== Top scorers ===
Rank	Player	Club	Goals
1	(Norway) Olav Nysæter	Kongsvinger	14
2	(Norway) André Krogsæter	Lillestrøm	13
3	(Norway) Steinar Aase	Start	12
4	(Norway) Anders Giske	Brann	11
4	(Norway) Svein Mathisen	Start	11
6	(Norway) Pål Jacobsen	Vålerengen	10
7	(Norway) Stein Kollshaugen	Moss	9
7	(Norway) Erik Nystuen	Kongsvinger	9
7	(Norway) Geir Henæs	Moss	9
10	(Norway) Sven Holm	Eik	8
10	(Norway) Tom Antonsen	Eik	8
10	(Norway) Håvard Moen	Rosenborg	8
10	(Norway) Geir Johansen	Eik	8

=== Attendances ===
Pos	Team	Total	High	Low	Average	Change
1	Brann	108,658	13,150	6,131	9,878	n/a^{2}
2	Vålerengen	104,502	15,730	5,655	9,500	+25.1%
3	Rosenborg	83,285	17,500	3,685	7,571	−4.6%
4	Eik	75,044	12,000	3,250	6,822	n/a^{2}
5	Viking	71,638	9,134	4,082	6,513	−14.3%
6	Start	55,889	9,735	3,093	5,081	+41.8%
7	Moss	42,823	6,224	2,671	3,893	−9.9%
8	Kongsvinger	42,130	6,794	2,123	3,830	n/a^{2}
9	Bryne	41,999	10,177	1,872	3,818	−1.5%
10	Lillestrøm	41,506	5,836	1,520	3,773	−5.6%
11	HamKam	33,678	6,104	802	3,062	−17.7%
12	Mjøndalen	28,221	4,825	910	2,566	−5.0%
	League total	729,373	17,500	802	5,526	+21.0%

Source: nifs.no
Notes:
2: Team played last season in 2. divisjon.
