= 1984 Norwegian First Division =

40th season of top-tier football league in Norway

1. divisjon
- Season: 1984
- Dates: 29 April – 14 October
- Champions: Vålerengen; 4th title
- Relegated: Fredrikstad; Strindheim
- European Cup: Vålerengen
- Cup Winners' Cup: Fredrikstad
- UEFA Cup: Viking
- Matches played: 132
- Goals scored: 380 (2.88 per match)
- Top goalscorer: Sverre Brandhaug (13 goals)
- Biggest home win: Viking 8–1 Rosenborg (12 August 1984)
- Biggest away win: Rosenborg 0–5 Vålerengen (25 June 1984)
- Highest scoring: Viking 8–1 Rosenborg (12 August 1984); Rosenborg 4–5 Bryne (9 September 1984)
- Longest winning run: Kongsvinger; Vålerengen (5 games)
- Longest unbeaten run: Vålerengen (14 games)
- Longest winless run: Fredrikstad; Strindheim (11 games)
- Longest losing run: Strindheim (9 games)
- Highest attendance: 18,566; Rosenborg 3–1 Molde (16 May 1984)
- Lowest attendance: 802; Strindheim 1–1 Molde (7 October 1984)
- Average attendance: 4,309 ▼22.0%

The 1984 1. divisjon was the 40th completed season of top division football in Norway. The season began on 29 April 1984 and ended 14 October 1984, not including play-off matches.

== Overview ==
22 games were played with 2 points given for wins and 1 for draws. Number eleven and twelve were relegated. The winners of the two groups of the 2. divisjon were promoted, as well as the winner of a series of play-off matches between number ten in the 1. divisjon and the two second-placed teams in the two groups of the 2. divisjon.

Vålerengen won the championship, their fourth title.

== Teams and locations ==
Note: Table lists in alphabetical order.

Team	Ap.	Location	Stadium
Bryne	9	Bryne	Bryne Stadion
Eik	7	Tønsberg	Tønsberg Gressbane
Fredrikstad	34	Fredrikstad	Fredrikstad Stadion
Kongsvinger	2	Kongsvinger	Gjemselund Stadion
Lillestrøm	21	Lillestrøm	Åråsen Stadion
Molde	10	Molde	Molde Stadion
Moss	11	Moss	Melløs Stadion
Rosenborg	21	Trondheim	Lerkendal Stadion
Start	17	Kristiansand	Kristiansand Stadion
Strindheim	1	Trondheim	Lerkendal Stadion
Vålerengen	29	Oslo	Bislett Stadion
Viking	37	Stavanger	Stavanger Stadion

== League table ==
Pos	Team	Pld	W	D	L	GF	GA	GD	Pts	Qualification or relegation
1	Vålerengen (C)	22	13	6	3	40	14	+26	32	Qualification for the European Cup first round
2	Viking	22	9	7	6	33	23	+10	25	Qualification for the UEFA Cup first round
3	Start	22	10	5	7	33	29	+4	25	
4	Bryne	22	7	10	5	37	36	+1	24	
5	Lillestrøm	22	8	7	7	39	30	+9	23	
6	Rosenborg	22	8	7	7	36	37	−1	23	
7	Kongsvinger	22	9	5	8	29	32	−3	23	
8	Molde	22	7	7	8	36	41	−5	21	
9	Eik	22	8	3	11	30	36	−6	19	
10	Moss (O)	22	4	9	9	26	30	−4	17	Qualification for the relegation play-offs
11	Fredrikstad (R)	22	5	7	10	23	35	−12	17	Cup Winners' Cup first round and relegation to the Second Division
12	Strindheim (R)	22	5	5	12	18	37	−19	15	Relegation to the Second Division

Source: NIFS
Rules for classification: 1) points; 2) goal difference; 3) number of goals scored.
(C) Champions; (O) Play-off winners; (R) Relegated

== Results ==
Home \ Away	BRY	EIK	FRE	KON	LIL	MOL	MOS	ROS	IKS	SDM	VIK	VÅL
Bryne	—	3–2	1–0	2–0	2–5	1–1	1–1	1–1	0–0	0–1	1–2	3–1
Eik	1–2	—	1–2	1–0	0–1	2–1	3–0	1–1	1–2	1–0	2–0	0–1
Fredrikstad	2–2	2–2	—	2–1	1–1	2–4	2–2	0–2	1–2	0–1	2–1	0–3
Kongsvinger	2–1	2–2	1–1	—	3–1	1–1	1–0	2–1	2–4	3–0	1–0	1–0
Lillestrøm	1–1	2–0	1–0	5–1	—	5–1	2–2	0–2	4–0	2–2	1–1	0–2
Molde	5–3	2–1	3–0	1–0	0–0	—	3–0	2–2	0–3	4–4	1–3	0–1
Moss	1–2	3–4	1–2	1–1	1–3	2–2	—	2–0	0–0	3–0	1–1	0–0
Rosenborg	4–5	3–1	1–1	4–1	2–2	3–1	0–2	—	2–1	4–0	0–0	0–5
Start	2–2	1–2	1–0	1–2	2–1	4–2	2–1	1–1	—	4–0	1–2	2–3
Strindheim	1–1	3–1	1–2	1–2	2–1	1–1	1–0	0–2	0–1	—	0–0	0–2
Viking	1–1	1–2	1–1	1–0	2–1	0–1	0–3	8–1	3–1	2–0	—	2–0
Vålerengen	2–2	4–0	2–0	2–2	3–0	3–0	0–0	1–0	0–0	3–0	2–2	—

Source: nifs.no (in Norwegian)
Legend: Blue = home team win; Yellow = draw; Red = away team win.

== Relegation play-offs ==
Results

- Vidar 2–2 HamKam
- Moss 4–1 Vidar
- HamKam 0–0 Moss

Pos	Team	Pld	W	D	L	GF	GA	GD	Pts	Relegation
1	Moss (O)	2	1	1	0	4	1	+3	3	Remained in the First Division
2	HamKam	2	0	2	0	2	2	0	2	Remained in the Second Division
3	Vidar	2	0	1	1	3	6	−3	1	Remained in the Second Division

Source: rsssf.no
(O) Play-off winners

== Season statistics ==
=== Top scorers ===
Rank	Player	Club	Goals
1	(Norway) Sverre Brandhaug	Rosenborg	13
2	(Norway) Erik Nystuen	Kongsvinger	11
2	(Norway) Arve Seland	Start	11
4	(Norway) Stig Norheim	Bryne	10
4	(England) Gary Goodchild	Viking	10
4	(Norway) André Krogsæter	Lillestrøm	10
4	(Norway) Joar Vaadal	Lillestrøm	10
8	(Norway) Vidar Davidsen	Vålerengen	9
8	(Norway) Tom Antonsen	Eik	9
8	(Norway) Olav Nysæter	Kongsvinger	9
11	(Norway) Paul Folkvord	Bryne	8
11	(Norway) Gøran Sørloth	Strindheim	8

=== Attendances ===
Pos	Team	Total	High	Low	Average	Change
1	Rosenborg	81,078	18,566	2,111	7,371	−2.6%
2	Viking	60,641	9,655	4,013	5,513	−15.4%
3	Vålerengen	60,368	10,485	1,496	5,488	−42.2%
4	Fredrikstad	47,829	7,029	2,447	4,348	n/a^{2}
5	Strindheim	45,901	17,386	900	4,173	n/a^{2}
6	Lillestrøm	44,375	8,215	1,135	4,034	+6.9%
7	Start	41,749	6,651	2,259	3,795	−25.3%
8	Eik	40,904	9,497	1,575	3,719	−45.5%
9	Moss	39,772	7,427	1,855	3,616	−7.1%
10	Bryne	37,942	8,263	1,643	3,449	−9.7%
11	Molde	36,791	5,108	2,300	3,345	n/a^{2}
12	Kongsvinger	31,415	3,909	2,078	2,856	−25.4%
	League total	568,765	18,566	900	4,309	−22.0%

Source: nifs.no
Notes:
2: Team played last season in 2. divisjon.
