= Pål Ekeberg Schjerve =

Norwegian footballer (born 1985)

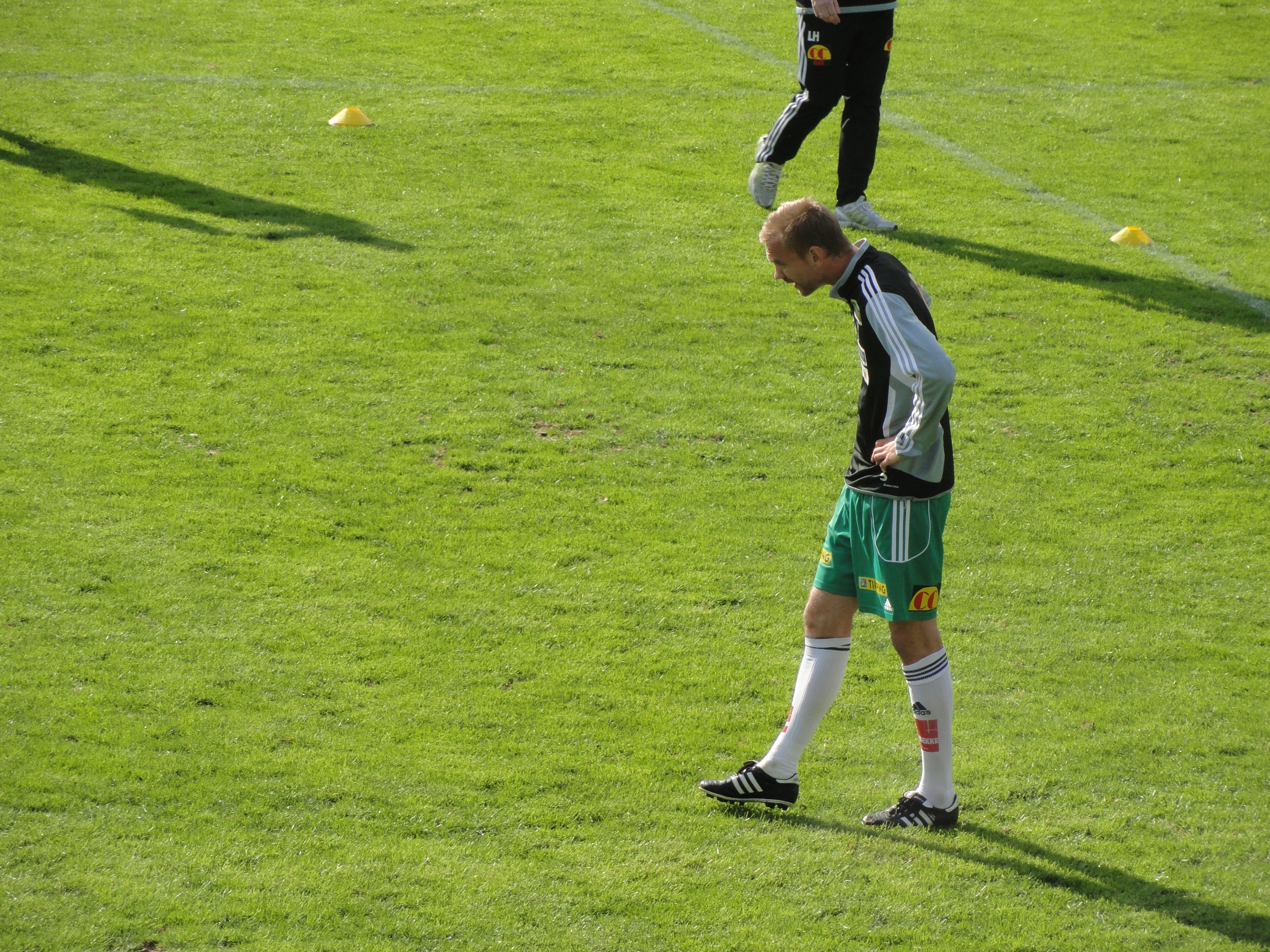
- 2011

Personal information
- Date of birth: 8 May 1985 (age 41)
- Place of birth: Hamar, Norway
- Height: 1.90 m (6 ft 3 in)
- Position: Defender

Team information
- Current team: Ham-Kam
- Number: 5

Youth career
- Tangen
- Ottestad
- Ham Kam

Senior career*
Years	Team	Apps	(Gls)
2002–2007	Ham-Kam	2	(0)
2004	→ Eidsvold Turn (loan)	24	(?)
2007	→ Eidsvold Turn (loan)		
2008–2009	Nybergsund	46	(1)
2010–	Ham-Kam	25	(5)
- * Club domestic league appearances and goals

Pål Ekeberg Schjerve (born 8 May 1985) is a Norwegian football defender who currently plays for Ham-Kam.

He was born in Hamar, and played youth football for Tangen IL in Stange Municipality and Ottestad IL before joining Hamarkameratene. He made his senior debut in the Norwegian football cup in 2002, and played his only two Norwegian Premier League games in 2006. He spent time on loan at Eidsvold TF in 2004 and 2007, the last time joining together with Kristian Skogsrud in a swap with Frode Bjørnevik. By 2007, though, he had already suffered a broken leg injury twice. Ahead of the 2008 season he joined Nybergsund IL, but ahead of the 2010 season he rejoined Hamarkameratene.
