= 1984 Norwegian Second Division =

2. divisjon
- Season: 1984
- Champions: Mjøndalen; Brann
- Promoted: Mjøndalen; Brann
- Relegated: Brumunddal; Odd; Lyn; Mo; Varegg; Nessegutten

The 1984 2. divisjon was a Norway's second-tier football league season.

The league was contested by 24 teams, divided into two groups; A and B. The winners of group A and B were promoted to the 1985 1. divisjon. The second placed teams met the 10th position finisher in the 1. divisjon in a qualification round where the winner was promoted to 1. divisjon. The bottom three teams inn both groups were relegated to the 3. divisjon.

== Tables ==
=== Group A ===
Pos	Team	Pld	W	D	L	GF	GA	GD	Pts	Promotion, qualification or relegation
1	Mjøndalen (C, P)	22	13	5	4	57	28	+29	31	Promotion to First Division
2	HamKam	22	12	5	5	41	17	+24	29	Qualification for the promotion play-offs
3	Sogndal	22	13	3	6	48	28	+20	29	
4	Pors	22	10	6	6	32	21	+11	26	
5	Strømsgodset	22	10	4	8	41	33	+8	24	
6	Jerv	22	9	5	8	29	24	+5	23	
7	Kvik Halden	22	9	5	8	30	31	−1	23	
8	Strømmen	22	8	4	10	32	44	−12	20	
9	Bærum	22	8	1	13	33	55	−22	17	
10	Brumunddal (R)	22	5	5	12	23	39	−16	15	Relegation to Third Division
11	Odd (R)	22	6	3	13	30	48	−18	15	Relegation to Third Division
12	Lyn (R)	22	5	2	15	21	49	−28	12	Relegation to Third Division

Source: rsssf.no
Rules for classification: 1) points; 2) goal difference; 3) number of goals scored.
(C) Champions; (P) Promoted; (R) Relegated

=== Group B ===
Pos	Team	Pld	W	D	L	GF	GA	GD	Pts	Promotion, qualification or relegation
1	Brann (C, P)	22	14	4	4	61	28	+33	32	Promotion to First Division
2	Vidar	22	12	7	3	44	27	+17	31	Qualification for the promotion play-offs
3	Mjølner	22	10	7	5	32	23	+9	27	
4	Tromsø	22	11	4	7	46	33	+13	26	
5	Steinkjer	22	9	5	8	28	37	−9	23	
6	Hødd	22	7	6	9	30	29	+1	20	
7	Haugar	22	7	6	9	29	30	−1	20	
8	Harstad	22	7	6	9	28	36	−8	20	
9	Sunndal	22	6	8	8	33	42	−9	20	
10	Mo (R)	22	6	7	9	28	32	−4	19	Relegation to Third Division
11	Varegg (R)	22	3	8	11	24	44	−20	14	Relegation to Third Division
12	Nessegutten (R)	22	3	6	13	20	42	−22	12	Relegation to Third Division

Source: rsssf.no
Rules for classification: 1) points; 2) goal difference; 3) number of goals scored.
(C) Champions; (P) Promoted; (R) Relegated

== Promotion play-offs ==
=== Results ===
- Vidar – HamKam 2–2
- Moss – Vidar 4–1
- HamKam – Moss 0–0

Moss won the qualification round and remained in the 1. divisjon.

=== Play-off table ===
Pos	Team	Pld	W	D	L	GF	GA	GD	Pts	Promotion or relegation
1	Moss (O)	2	1	1	0	4	1	+3	3	Remained in the First Division
2	HamKam	2	0	2	0	2	2	0	2	Remained in the Second Division
3	Vidar	2	0	1	1	3	6	−3	1	Remained in the Second Division

Source: rsssf.no
Rules for classification: 1) points; 2) goal difference; 3) number of goals scored.
(O) Play-off winners

== Top goalscorers ==
- 22 goals:

Odd Johnsen, Mjøndalen

- 19 goals:

(England) Peter Osborne, Haugar

- 17 goals:

Tore Hadler-Olsen, Brann

- 15 goals:

Trond Johansen, Tromsø

- 13 goals:

Svein Bakke, Sogndal
Roald Nergård, Sunndal

- 12 goals:

Per Terje Markussen, Mjøndalen

- 11 goals:

Trygve Johannessen, Vidar and Brann
Ivar Morten Normark, Mjølner
Jan Arild Roppen, Hødd
