= Ole Petter Skonnord =

Norwegian footballer (born 1968)

Personal information
- Date of birth: 6 July 1968 (age 58)
- Position: Striker

Youth career
- Hamarkameratene

Senior career*
Years	Team	Apps	(Gls)
1988	Hamarkameratene		
1989–1993	Elverum		
1994	Hamarkameratene	12	(0)
1995–1996	Skeid		
1996	Dundee	4	(0)
1997–2000	Kjelsås		
- * Club domestic league appearances and goals

Ole Petter Skonnord (born 6 July 1968) is a retired Norwegian football striker.

He hails from Ridabu. He joined Hamarkameratene as a child and got one season on senior level before moving on to Elverum in 1989. In 1994 he rejoined Hamarkameratene, now in Eliteserien, and got 12 games. He moved down one level to Skeid, but won promotion to 1996 Eliteserien where he played 24 games. Not offered a new contract with Skeid in 1997, he went on trial with Dundee F.C. during the winter of 1996–97, but was ultimately not offered a transfer. Instead he joined Kjelsås, where he managed 15 goals in the 1998 1. divisjon.

His son Olav Henrik Skonnord has also played for Kjelsås as well as Nardo.
