= Olav Nysæter =

Norwegian footballer (born 1955)

Personal information
- Date of birth: 28 February 1955 (age 71)
- Place of birth: Norway
- Position: Forward

Senior career*
Years	Team	Apps	(Gls)
1980–1987	Kongsvinger	124	(46)

International career
1983	Norway	2	(0)
- * Club domestic league appearances and goals

Olav Nysæter (born 28 February 1955) is a Norwegian former footballer who played as a forward for Kongsvinger. He was capped twice for the Norway national team. He has also been a sporting director at Kongsvinger.

== Club career ==
Olav Nysæter played for Vaaler IF, Koppang IL, Flisa IL and Kongsvinger IL. He got his debut for Kongsvinger in 1980, and his first-tier debut on 24 April 1983 in a league game against Lillestrøm which ended in a 2–2 draw. Kongsvinger's first goal of the game, scored by Nysæter, was the club's first ever top division goal. The club finished third in the league in back to back seasons, in 1986 and 1987. On 10 October 1987, Nysæter played his last game in a 1–0 defeat of Mjøndalen. He played a total of 124 league games for the club scoring 46 goals.

== International career ==
In 1983, Olav Nysæter was capped twice for Norway. On 9 November, he got his debut away in a qualifier for the 1984 Summer Olympics against Poland, a game Poland defeated Norway 1–0. Nysæter played his second and last international appearance in Potsdam three days later, on 12 November 1983, in a game Norway lost 1–0 to East Germany.

== After playing career ==
In November 2007, Nysæter replaced Åge Steen as sporting director at Kongsvinger. In December 2007, after only 34 days in the job, he threatened to leave the position due to the club's poor economy and lack of ambitions. However, Nysæter continued and explained this with communicative misunderstandings. He left the position in 2008 and was replaced by Morten Kristiansen.

== Honours ==
Individual

- Norwegian top division top scorer: 1983
