= Norwegian reserve football teams =

Norwegian reserve football teams compete at all levels of league football within the Norwegian football league system apart from the top two divisions, Eliteserien and the First Division. The highest league these teams can currently enter is the Second Division, set at the third tier of the league system. The reserve teams are attached to their first teams with a "2" suffix and must play in a lower league than the first team.

== Level eligibility ==
For men's clubs whose main teams are in the highest 3 tiers, there must be a gap of 2 or more divisions between the main team and the reserve team. For instance, reserve teams of Eliteserien teams cannot be promoted to higher than tier 3 (PostNord-ligaen); and reserve teams of tier 2 (OBOS-ligaen) teams cannot be promoted to higher than tier 4 (Norwegian Third Division). For clubs whose main teams play in tier 4 or below, there must be a gap of 1 or more divisions.

If a reserve team ends up at a promotion spot when it is not allowed to be promoted, the promotion is awarded to the next team in the league standings which is allowed to be promoted.

If a main team gets relegated, then the reserve team is relegated regardless of the latter's league season placement if it played at their previously highest allowed division. In this case, the highest-placed team among those who would normally be relegated will remain in the division.

Rosenborg BK fielded a third team (Rosenborg 3) between circa 2005 and 2013, during which time additional rules for divisional eligibilities were in place. Third teams (of which Rosenborg 3 was the only one) could not be promoted higher than tier 4 (Third Division). If the "2" team was relegated to Third Division, then the "3" team would be automatically relegated to tier 5 (Fourth Division).

Reserve teams are not eligible to enter the Norwegian Football Cup. Separate under-20 junior teams play in the Norwegian Youth Cup, the winner of which qualifies for the UEFA Youth League, but they do not play in the Norwegian league system.

== Controversy ==
Reserve teams have in general been criticized for fielding uneven teams from week to week, with many first-team players one week and more youth players the next. They have also been criticized for keeping smaller clubs out of the Second Division, meaning a more centralized football culture. In 2009 manager Ivar Morten Normark proposed to throw the reserve teams out of the ordinary league pyramid, and other managers like Dag-Eilev Fagermo agreed. In a survey, 19 of 31 responding Second Division clubs wanted the reserve teams out, as did 30 of the 49 responding Third Division clubs.

At the 2010 congress of the Football Association of Norway, new rules for reserve teams were agreed to. Since then the rules have been changed several times, most recently in 2023. As of 2023 the rules prohibit reserve teams for clubs in Eliteserien and the First Division to simultaneously field more than three players who were older than 22 years old at the start of the year, as well as requiring reserve team players to not have started the last competitive fixture for the senior team.

== Sporting success ==
From time to time, a reserve team has won its group in the Second Division. This is the highest sporting position a reserves team can achieve, since promotion is impossible. In the 1991 Second Division, the reserve teams of both Brann and Rosenborg won their respective groups. Rosenborg 2 also won their groups in 1996 and 1998. In the 1992 Second Division, Lillestrøm's reserve team won group 1. In the 2005 Second Division, Viking's reserve team won group 3. Over the years the Second Division has been reduced to just two groups of 14 teams each, and as of 2025 there is only one reserve team playing in the Second Division.

== Today ==
This is a list of where the reserve teams of Eliteserien and First Division clubs play, as of the 2026 season.

Reserve teams of Eliteserien clubs

Club	Division
Aalesund 2	Third Division
Bodø/Glimt 2	Fourth Division
Brann 2	Third Division
Fredrikstad 2	Fourth Division
HamKam 2	Fourth Division
KFUM Oslo 2	Third Division
Kristiansund 2	Fourth Division
Lillestrøm 2	Third Division
Molde 2	Third Division
Rosenborg 2	Third Division
Sandefjord 2	Third Division
Sarpsborg 2	Third Division
Start 2	Fourth Division
Tromsø 2	Third Division
Viking 2	Third Division
Vålerenga 2	Third Division

Reserve teams of First Division clubs

Club	Division
Bryne 2	Fourth Division
Egersund 2	Fourth Division
Haugesund 2	Third Division
Hødd 2	Fourth Division
Kongsvinger 2	Third Division
Lyn 2	Third Division
Moss 2	Fourth Division
Odd 2	Third Division
Ranheim 2	Third Division
Raufoss 2	Fourth Division
Sandnes Ulf 2	Fourth Division
Sogndal 2	Third Division
Stabæk 2	Third Division
Strømmen 2	Fourth Division
Strømsgodset 2	Third Division
Åsane 2	Third Division
