= 1991 Norwegian Second Division =

Association football league

The 1991 2. divisjon, the third highest association football league for men in Norway.

22 games were played in 6 groups, with 3 points given for wins and 1 for draws. Odd, Bærum, Vard, Os, Stjørdals-Blink and Bodø/Glimt were promoted to the First Division. Number ten, eleven and twelve were relegated to the 3. divisjon. The winning teams from each of the 19 groups in the 3. divisjon were promoted to the 2. divisjon.

== League tables ==
=== Group 1 ===
Pos	Team	Pld	W	D	L	GF	GA	GD	Pts	Promotion or relegation
1	Odd (P)	22	16	2	4	60	30	+30	50	Promotion to First Division
2	Fram Larvik	22	15	3	4	52	28	+24	48	
3	Grei	22	14	3	5	40	18	+22	45	
4	Skeid	22	13	5	4	65	29	+36	44	
5	Ørn-Horten	22	10	4	8	40	41	−1	34	
6	Lillestrøm 2	22	10	3	9	45	40	+5	33	
7	Falk	22	8	4	10	41	44	−3	28	
8	Lørenskog	22	7	5	10	31	45	−14	26	
9	Sørumsand	22	5	6	11	30	46	−16	21	
10	Aurskog/Finstadbru (R)	22	4	6	12	31	49	−18	18	Relegation to Third Division
11	Eidsvold TF (R)	22	5	1	16	27	53	−26	16	Relegation to Third Division
12	Bjørkelangen (R)	22	4	0	18	27	68	−41	12	Relegation to Third Division

(P) Promoted; (R) Relegated

=== Group 2 ===
Pos	Team	Pld	W	D	L	GF	GA	GD	Pts	Promotion or relegation
1	Bærum (P)	22	17	2	3	60	20	+40	53	Promotion to First Division
2	Stabæk	22	12	5	5	39	19	+20	41	
3	Kjelsås	22	10	7	5	40	29	+11	37	
4	Nybergsund	22	10	6	6	36	35	+1	36	
5	Sarpsborg	22	9	6	7	40	35	+5	33	
6	Faaberg	22	9	6	7	34	30	+4	33	
7	Mercantile	22	8	7	7	24	27	−3	31	
8	Ullern	22	8	5	9	37	40	−3	29	
9	Sprint-Jeløy	22	6	6	10	37	41	−4	24	
10	Selbak (R)	22	4	7	11	25	44	−19	19	Relegation to Third Division
11	Tune (R)	22	4	6	12	26	47	−21	18	Relegation to Third Division
12	Strømsgodset 2 (R)	22	2	3	17	14	45	−31	9	Relegation to Third Division

(P) Promoted; (R) Relegated

=== Group 3 ===
Pos	Team	Pld	W	D	L	GF	GA	GD	Pts	Promotion or relegation
1	Vard (P)	22	18	1	3	48	13	+35	55	Promotion to First Division
2	Stord	22	16	1	5	53	31	+22	49	
3	Viking 2	22	13	4	5	70	22	+48	43	
4	Start 2	22	12	4	6	35	22	+13	40	
5	Jerv	22	10	1	11	35	48	−13	31	
6	Ålgård	22	9	3	10	27	31	−4	30	
7	Donn	22	8	4	10	39	56	−17	28	
8	Asker	22	7	4	11	33	57	−24	25	
9	Ulf-Sandnes	22	6	6	10	36	36	0	24	
10	Randaberg (R)	22	7	2	13	30	44	−14	23	Relegation to Third Division
11	Figgjo (R)	22	5	5	12	28	40	−12	20	Relegation to Third Division
12	Skjold (R)	22	3	1	18	23	57	−34	10	Relegation to Third Division

(P) Promoted; (R) Relegated

=== Group 4 ===
Pos	Team	Pld	W	D	L	GF	GA	GD	Pts	Promotion or relegation
1	Brann 2	22	14	2	6	53	24	+29	44	
2	Fyllingen 2	22	13	3	6	58	28	+30	42	
3	Os (P)	22	11	3	8	30	20	+10	36	Promotion to First Division
4	Skarbøvik	22	10	6	6	40	36	+4	36	
5	Volda	22	9	4	9	30	36	−6	31	
6	Vadmyra	22	8	7	7	28	37	−9	31	
7	Åsane	22	8	4	10	31	32	−1	28	
8	Stranda	22	7	7	8	26	29	−3	28	
9	Lyngbø	22	7	5	10	25	33	−8	26	
10	Florø	22	6	6	10	27	44	−17	24	Relegation to Third Division
11	Brattvåg (R)	22	6	5	11	25	29	−4	23	Relegation to Third Division
12	Førde (R)	22	4	6	12	21	47	−26	18	Relegation to Third Division

(P) Promoted; (R) Relegated

=== Group 5 ===
Pos	Team	Pld	W	D	L	GF	GA	GD	Pts	Promotion or relegation
1	Rosenborg 2	22	12	4	6	56	30	+26	40	
2	Stjørdals-Blink (P)	22	12	4	6	38	27	+11	40	Promotion to First Division
3	Melhus	22	11	6	5	35	23	+12	39	
4	Byåsen	22	9	6	7	37	34	+3	33	
5	Åndalsnes	22	9	5	8	38	36	+2	32	
6	Namsos	22	8	7	7	33	37	−4	31	
7	Alvdal	22	8	6	8	33	38	−5	30	
8	Steinkjer	22	8	5	9	30	28	+2	29	
9	KIL/Hemne	22	7	7	8	36	37	−1	28	
10	Sunndal (R)	22	8	4	10	34	42	−8	28	Relegation to Third Division
11	Nessegutten (R)	22	7	2	13	40	48	−8	23	Relegation to Third Division
12	Molde 2 (R)	22	4	2	16	38	68	−30	14	Relegation to Third Division

(P) Promoted; (R) Relegated

=== Group 6 ===
Pos	Team	Pld	W	D	L	GF	GA	GD	Pts	Promotion or relegation
1	Bodø/Glimt (P)	22	19	2	1	67	16	+51	59	Promotion to First Division
2	Stålkameratene	22	13	2	7	51	42	+9	41	
3	Grovfjord	22	11	5	6	48	28	+20	38	
4	Narvik/Nor	22	11	4	7	58	34	+24	37	
5	Skarp	22	11	2	9	42	32	+10	35	
6	Honningsvåg	22	10	2	10	38	37	+1	32	
7	Alta	22	9	3	10	34	39	−5	30	
8	Gevir/Vinkelen	22	9	3	10	37	50	−13	30	
9	Andenes (R)	22	9	2	11	28	40	−12	29	Relegation to Third Division
10	Harstad (R)	22	6	4	12	29	35	−6	22	Relegation to Third Division
11	Skjervøy (R)	22	6	2	14	26	68	−42	20	Relegation to Third Division
12	Fauske/Sprint (R)	22	2	1	19	19	57	−38	7	Relegation to Third Division

(P) Promoted; (R) Relegated
