= 1985 Norwegian Second Division =

2. divisjon
- Season: 1985
- Champions: HamKam; Strømmen
- Promoted: HamKam; Strømmen; Tromsø
- Relegated: Haugar; Pors; Kvik Halden; Alvdal; Strindheim; Harstad

The 1985 2. Divisjon was a second-tier football league in Norway. The league consisted of 24 teams, divided into groups A and B. The winners within each group were promoted to the 1986 1. divisjon. The second-place teams of each group met the tenth position finisher in the 1. divisjon in a qualification round, with the winner promoted to 1. divisjon. The bottom three teams of both groups were relegated to the 3. divisjon.

== Tables ==
=== Group A ===
Pos	Team	Pld	W	D	L	GF	GA	GD	Pts	Promotion, qualification or relegation
1	HamKam (C, P)	22	15	4	3	44	21	+23	34	Promotion to First Division
2	Sogndal	22	13	3	6	48	27	+21	29	Qualification for the promotion play-offs
3	Vidar	22	12	4	6	47	24	+23	28	
4	Faaberg	22	10	6	6	43	33	+10	26	
5	Vard	22	9	7	6	31	31	0	25	
6	Fredrikstad	22	10	4	8	39	41	−2	24	
7	Ørn	22	8	5	9	35	40	−5	21	
8	Strømsgodset	22	8	4	10	45	37	+8	20	
9	Jerv	22	6	4	12	25	41	−16	16	
10	Haugar (R)	22	6	4	12	26	47	−21	16	Relegation to Third Division
11	Pors (R)	22	5	5	12	18	40	−22	15	Relegation to Third Division
12	Kvik Halden (R)	22	4	2	16	24	43	−19	10	Relegation to Third Division

Source: rsssf.no
Rules for classification: 1) points; 2) goal difference; 3) number of goals scored.
(C) Champions; (P) Promoted; (R) Relegated

=== Group B ===
Pos	Team	Pld	W	D	L	GF	GA	GD	Pts	Promotion, qualification or relegation
1	Strømmen (C, P)	22	19	2	1	54	14	+40	40	Promotion to First Division
2	Tromsø (O, P)	22	15	3	4	45	20	+25	33	Qualification for the promotion play-offs
3	Hødd	22	12	7	3	57	23	+34	31	
4	Steinkjer	22	11	7	4	45	32	+13	29	
5	Sunndal	22	9	6	7	34	29	+5	24	
6	Mjølner	22	9	5	8	32	26	+6	23	
7	Aalesund	22	7	4	11	22	41	−19	18	
8	Bærum	22	7	2	13	33	42	−9	16	
9	Grand Bodø	22	5	4	13	22	42	−20	14	
10	Alvdal (R)	22	3	8	11	21	42	−21	14	Relegation to Third Division
11	Strindheim (R)	22	5	3	14	27	44	−17	13	Relegation to Third Division
12	Harstad (R)	22	3	3	16	20	57	−37	9	Relegation to Third Division

Source: rsssf.no
Rules for classification: 1) points; 2) goal difference; 3) number of goals scored.
(C) Champions; (O) Play-off winners; (P) Promoted; (R) Relegated

== Promotion play-offs ==
=== Results ===
- Tromsø – Sogndal 1–0
- Sogndal – Moss 0–2
- Moss – Tromsø 0–1

Tromsø won the qualification round and was promoted to the 1. divisjon.

=== Play-off table ===
Pos	Team	Pld	W	D	L	GF	GA	GD	Pts	Promotion or relegation
1	Tromsø (O, P)	2	2	0	0	2	0	+2	4	Promotion to First Division
2	Moss (R)	2	1	0	1	2	1	+1	2	Relegation to Second Division
3	Sogndal	2	0	0	2	0	3	−3	0	

Source: rsssf.no
Rules for classification: 1) points; 2) goal difference; 3) number of goals scored.
(O) Play-off winners; (P) Promoted; (R) Relegated
