= 1991 Tippeligaen =

47th season of top-tier football league in Norway

Tippeligaen
- Season: 1991
- Dates: 27 April – 13 October
- Champions: Viking; 8th title
- Relegated: Fyllingen; Strømsgodset
- Champions League: Viking
- Cup Winners' Cup: Strømsgodset
- UEFA Cup: Rosenborg
- Matches: 132
- Goals: 345 (2.61 per match)
- Top goalscorer: Karl Petter Løken (12 goals)
- Biggest home win: Lillestrøm 6–1 Tromsø (6 October 1991)
- Biggest away win: Molde 0–7 Strømsgodset (9 June 1991)
- Highest scoring: Rosenborg 6–2 Sogndal (18 August 1991)
- Highest attendance: 20,454; Rosenborg 0–0 Viking (16 May 1991)
- Lowest attendance: 1,291; Lyn 1–1 Brann (22 September 1991)
- Average attendance: 5,656 ▲13.5%

The 1991 Tippeligaen was the 47th completed season of top division football in Norway. 22 game-weeks were played with 3 points given for wins and 1 for draws. Number eleven and twelve are relegated. The winners of the two groups of the 1. divisjon are promoted, as well as the winner of a series of play-off matches between the two second placed teams in the two groups of the 1. divisjon and number ten in the Tippeligaen.

The season began on 27 April 1991. The season ended on 13 October 1991, with Viking claiming their eighth league title. Viking were thus the last club to win the league before Rosenborg's 13-year domination started.

== Teams and locations ==
Note: Table lists in alphabetical order.

Team	Ap.	Location	Stadium
Brann	35	Bergen	Brann Stadion
Fyllingen	2	Bergen	Krohnsminde
Kongsvinger	9	Kongsvinger	Gjemselund Stadion
Lillestrøm	28	Lillestrøm	Åråsen Stadion
Lyn	24	Oslo	Ullevaal Stadion
Molde	17	Molde	Molde Stadion
Rosenborg	28	Trondheim	Lerkendal Stadion
Sogndal	4	Sogndalsfjøra	Fosshaugane
Start	23	Kristiansand	Kristiansand Stadion
Strømsgodset	13	Drammen	Marienlyst Stadion
Tromsø	6	Tromsø	Alfheim Stadion
Viking	42	Stavanger	Stavanger Stadion

== League table ==
Pos	Team	Pld	W	D	L	GF	GA	GD	Pts	Qualification or relegation
1	Viking (C)	22	12	5	5	37	27	+10	41	Qualification for the Champions League first round
2	Rosenborg	22	10	6	6	38	28	+10	36	Qualification for the UEFA Cup first round
3	Start	22	10	4	8	31	21	+10	34	
4	Lyn	22	8	10	4	26	26	0	34	
5	Lillestrøm	22	9	4	9	31	27	+4	31	
6	Tromsø	22	9	4	9	28	34	−6	31	
7	Molde	22	7	6	9	33	38	−5	27	
8	Kongsvinger	22	7	6	9	26	34	−8	27	
9	Sogndal	22	7	6	9	22	31	−9	27	
10	Brann (O)	22	6	8	8	22	25	−3	26	Qualification for the relegation play-offs
11	Fyllingen (R)	22	6	7	9	21	21	0	25	Relegation to First Division
12	Strømsgodset (R)	22	5	6	11	30	33	−3	21	Cup Winners' Cup qualifying and relegation to First Division

Source: fotball.no
Rules for classification: 1) points; 2) goal difference; 3) number of goals scored.
(C) Champions; (O) Play-off winners; (R) Relegated

== Results ==
Home \ Away	BRA	FYL	KON	LIL	LYN	MOL	ROS	SOG	IKS	STM	TRO	VIK
Brann	—	0–2	0–0	1–2	3–0	2–2	1–1	0–0	0–1	2–0	1–2	0–2
Fyllingen	0–0	—	1–2	2–2	1–0	2–2	0–1	2–1	1–3	1–2	3–0	2–0
Kongsvinger	1–2	0–0	—	2–3	1–1	1–4	1–4	2–0	1–3	1–1	5–3	2–1
Lillestrøm	0–1	1–0	0–1	—	1–1	1–0	2–0	0–1	1–0	1–1	6–1	1–2
Lyn	1–1	1–0	0–0	3–2	—	2–0	0–4	1–1	1–0	3–1	1–1	1–1
Molde	1–1	1–1	3–0	3–3	3–0	—	4–1	2–0	0–4	0–7	1–2	0–3
Rosenborg	4–0	2–1	0–0	2–0	2–2	3–0	—	6–2	1–1	3–0	1–1	0–0
Sogndal	2–1	1–2	1–0	0–2	0–2	0–0	3–1	—	1–0	2–2	3–2	1–1
Start	1–3	1–0	0–3	1–0	0–0	1–0	5–0	0–1	—	2–2	0–1	4–1
Strømsgodset	0–1	0–0	4–0	1–2	0–1	0–2	3–0	0–0	1–3	—	0–2	3–1
Tromsø	1–1	1–0	2–3	2–0	1–1	1–3	0–1	1–0	3–1	1–0	—	0–1
Viking	2–1	0–0	1–0	2–1	3–4	3–2	2–1	4–2	0–0	5–2	2–0	—

Source: NIFS (in Norwegian)
Legend: Blue = home team win; Yellow = draw; Red = away team win.

== Relegation play-offs ==
Brann, Bryne, and Strindheim played play-offs, Brann won and remained in Tippeligaen.

Results

- Match 1: Bryne 0–1 Brann
- Match 2: Brann 1–0 Strindheim
- Match 3: Strindheim 0–2 Bryne

Table

Pos	Team	Pld	W	D	L	GF	GA	GD	Pts	Qualification or relegation
1	Brann (O)	2	2	0	0	2	0	+2	6	Remained in the Tippeligaen
2	Bryne	2	1	0	1	2	1	+1	3	Remained in the First Division
3	Strindheim	2	0	0	2	0	3	−3	0	Remained in the First Division

Source: rsssf.no
(O) Play-off winners

== Season statistics ==
=== Top scorers ===
Rank	Player	Club	Goals
1	(Norway) Karl Petter Løken	Rosenborg	12
2	(Norway) Øystein Neerland	Molde	11
3	(Norway) Stein Berg Johansen	Tromsø	10
4	(Norway) Odd Johnsen	Strømsgodset	9
4	(Norway) Morten Pettersen	Start	9
4	(Norway) Gøran Sørloth	Rosenborg	9
7	(Norway) Petter Belsvik	Molde	8
7	(Norway) Børre Meinseth	Viking	8
7	(Norway) Halvor Storskogen	Strømsgodset	8
10	(Norway) Jostein Flo	Sogndal	7
10	(Norway) Tom Fodstad	Lyn	7
10	(Norway) Alf Kåre Tveit	Viking	7

=== Attendances ===
Pos	Team	Total	High	Low	Average	Change
1	Brann	127,114	16,600	6,887	11,556	+33.8%
2	Rosenborg	125,961	20,454	6,959	11,451	+3.0%
3	Viking	107,129	13,402	5,168	9,739	+47.9%
4	Start	73,362	14,386	2,296	6,669	+34.2%
5	Tromsø	49,958	7,242	2,694	4,542	−11.2%
6	Strømsgodset	48,496	5,434	3,110	4,409	−16.9%
7	Lyn	46,832	10,002	1,291	4,257	n/a^{2}
8	Lillestrøm	41,243	6,366	1,822	3,749	+20.2%
9	Fyllingen	36,950	11,033	1,742	3,359	−7.1%
10	Molde	36,273	6,258	2,108	3,298	−2.1%
11	Kongsvinger	28,929	3,385	1,782	2,630	+16.3%
12	Sogndal	24,283	3,778	1,649	2,208	n/a^{2}
	League total	746,530	20,454	1,291	5,656	+13.5%

Source: nifs.no
Notes:
2: Team played last season in 2. divisjon.
