= 1992 Norwegian First Division =

1. divisjon
- Season: 1992
- Promoted: Bodø/Glimt; Fyllingen
- Relegated: Odd, Pors and Fredrikstad; Os, Stjørdals-Blink and Haugar
- Matches played: 264
- Goals scored: 911 (3.45 per match)

The 1992 1. divisjon, Norway's second-tier football league, began play on 26 April 1992 and ended on 4 October 1992. The league was contested by 24 teams, divided in two groups and the winner of each group won promotion to Tippeligaen, while the runners-up played a promotion-playoff against the 10th placed team in the 1992 Tippeligaen. The bottom three teams were relegated to the 2. divisjon.

Bodø/Glimt and Fyllingen won promotion to Tippeligaen, while Odd, Pors, Fredrikstad, Os, Stjørdals-Blink and Haugar was relegated to the 2. divisjon.

== League tables ==
=== Group A ===
Pos	Team	Pld	W	D	L	GF	GA	GD	Pts	Promotion, qualification or relegation
1	Bodø/Glimt (C, P)	22	16	4	2	69	21	+48	52	Promotion to Tippeligaen
2	Drøbak/Frogn	22	12	2	8	44	36	+8	38	Qualification for the promotion play-offs
3	Strømsgodset	22	11	4	7	48	35	+13	37	
4	Eik-Tønsberg	22	10	4	8	40	38	+2	34	
5	Elverum	22	9	4	9	42	33	+9	31	
6	Tromsdalen	22	9	4	9	30	34	−4	31	
7	Moss	22	9	3	10	35	37	−2	30	
8	Bærum	22	8	5	9	30	34	−4	29	
9	VIF Fotball	22	9	2	11	30	39	−9	29	
10	Odd (R)	22	8	4	10	33	44	−11	28	Relegation to Second Division
11	Pors (R)	22	5	5	12	26	51	−25	20	Relegation to Second Division
12	Fredrikstad (R)	22	3	5	14	18	43	−25	14	Relegation to Second Division

Source: nifs.no
Rules for classification: 1) points; 2) goal difference; 3) number of goals scored.
(C) Champions; (P) Promoted; (R) Relegated

=== Group B ===
Pos	Team	Pld	W	D	L	GF	GA	GD	Pts	Promotion, qualification or relegation
1	Fyllingen (C, P)	22	16	3	3	54	20	+34	51	Promotion to Tippeligaen
2	Strømmen	22	13	4	5	52	20	+32	43	Qualification for the promotion play-offs
3	Fana	22	12	4	6	41	30	+11	40	
4	Bryne	22	12	3	7	47	32	+15	39	
5	Strindheim	22	9	4	9	34	28	+6	31	
6	Djerv 1919	22	8	5	9	47	40	+7	29	
7	Hødd	22	8	4	10	52	46	+6	28	
8	Vard	22	7	6	9	21	32	−11	27	
9	Aalesund	22	6	8	8	31	28	+3	26	
10	Os (R)	22	7	5	10	27	37	−10	26	Relegation to Second Division
11	Stjørdals-Blink (R)	22	5	6	11	34	56	−22	21	Relegation to Second Division
12	Haugar (R)	22	3	0	19	26	97	−71	9	Relegation to Second Division

Source: nifs.no
Rules for classification: 1) points; 2) goal difference; 3) number of goals scored.
(C) Champions; (P) Promoted; (R) Relegated

== See also ==
- 1992 Tippeligaen
- 1992 2. divisjon
- 1992 3. divisjon
