= Namsos IL =

Norwegian football club

- Full name: Namsos Idrettslag
- Founded: 28 November 1904
- Ground: Kleppen arena, Namsos
- League: Fifth Division
- 2025: 6th
Home colours

Namsos Idrettslag is a Norwegian sports club from Namsos, Trøndelag. It was founded on 28 November 1904. It has sections for association football, alpine skiing, and ski jumping.

The men's football team currently plays in the Fifth Division, the sixth tier of Norwegian football.

The team played in the Second Division throughout most the 1990s, until 1999. The team had intermittent stints in the Third Division in 1995 and 1998, followed by a long Third Division spell from 2000 to 2011. Another stint followed from 2015 to 2016. The team played in the Fourth Division from 2017 to 2023.

The women's football team plays in the Fourth Division.
