= Faaberg Fotball =

Norwegian football club

- Full name: Faaberg Fotball
- Nickname: Faaberg
- Ground: Jorekstad, Fåberg
- Chairman: Ole Petter Østerbø
- Manager: Jan Rune Teigen
- League: Norwegian fourth Division
Home colours

Faaberg Fotball is a football club from Fåberg, in the northern part of Lillehammer Municipality in Innlandet county, Norway.

It was the club Where Norwegian international Jon Inge Høiland started his career.
