= 1992 Tippeligaen =

48th season of top-tier football league in Norway

Tippeligaen
- Season: 1992
- Dates: 25 April – 18 October
- Champions: Rosenborg; 7th title
- Relegated: Sogndal; Mjøndalen
- Champions League: Rosenborg
- Cup Winners' Cup: Lillestrøm
- UEFA Cup: Kongsvinger
- Matches played: 132
- Goals scored: 403 (3.05 per match)
- Top goalscorer: Kjell Roar Kaasa (17 goals)
- Biggest home win: Lillestrøm 6–0 Tromsø (24 May 1992); Rosenborg 6–0 Start (8 July 1992); Rosenborg 6–0 Kongsvinger (18 October 1992); Tromsø 6–0 Sogndal (18 October 1992)
- Biggest away win: Molde 0–4 Lillestrøm (31 May 1992); Mjøndalen 0–4 Lillestrøm (14 June 1992); Mjøndalen 0–4 Molde (16 August 1992); Start 0–4 Rosenborg (19 September 1992)
- Highest scoring: Lyn 7–3 Sogndal (27 September 1992)
- Highest attendance: 24,023; Rosenborg 5–1 Sogndal (16 May 1992)
- Lowest attendance: 917; Mjøndalen 3–2 HamKam (12 September 1992)
- Average attendance: 5,416 ▼4.2%

The 1992 Tippeligaen was the 48th completed season of top division football in Norway. Each team played 22 games with 3 points given for wins and 1 for draws. Number eleven and twelve are relegated. The winners of the two groups of the 1. divisjon are promoted, as well as the winner of a series of play-off matches between the two second placed teams in the two groups of the 1. divisjon and number ten in the Tippeligaen.

This season was the first of a 13-year-long streak of Rosenborg victories.

== Teams and locations ==
Note: Table lists in alphabetical order.

Team	Ap.	Location	Stadium
Brann	36	Bergen	Brann Stadion
HamKam	15	Hamar	Briskeby
Kongsvinger	10	Kongsvinger	Gjemselund Stadion
Lillestrøm	29	Lillestrøm	Åråsen Stadion
Lyn	25	Oslo	Ullevaal Stadion
Mjøndalen	18	Mjøndalen	Nedre Eiker Stadion
Molde	18	Molde	Molde Stadion
Rosenborg	29	Trondheim	Lerkendal Stadion
Sogndal	5	Sogndalsfjøra	Fosshaugane
Start	24	Kristiansand	Kristiansand Stadion
Tromsø	7	Tromsø	Alfheim Stadion
Viking	43	Stavanger	Stavanger Stadion

== League table ==
Pos	Team	Pld	W	D	L	GF	GA	GD	Pts	Qualification or relegation
1	Rosenborg (C)	22	14	4	4	58	19	+39	46	Qualification for the Champions League preliminary round
2	Kongsvinger	22	12	4	6	43	27	+16	40	Qualification for the UEFA Cup first round
3	Start	22	11	6	5	38	28	+10	39	
4	Lillestrøm	22	11	5	6	48	28	+20	38	Qualification for the Cup Winners' Cup qualifying round
5	Lyn	22	11	4	7	33	29	+4	37	
6	Molde	22	11	3	8	30	30	0	36	
7	Brann	22	4	12	6	26	30	−4	24	
8	Tromsø	22	6	6	10	22	37	−15	24	
9	Viking	22	4	9	9	25	34	−9	21	
10	Ham-Kam (O)	22	5	5	12	30	46	−16	20	Qualification for the relegation play-offs
11	Sogndal (R)	22	5	5	12	30	53	−23	20	Relegation to First Division
12	Mjøndalen (R)	22	5	3	14	20	42	−22	18	Relegation to First Division

Source: fotball.no
Rules for classification: 1) points; 2) goal difference; 3) number of goals scored.
(C) Champions; (O) Play-off winners; (R) Relegated

== Relegation play-offs ==
The qualification play-off matches were contested between HamKam (10th in Tippeligaen), Drøbak-Frogn (2nd in the First Division - Group A), and Strømmen (2nd in the First Division - Group B). HamKam won one game and drew one and remained in Tippeligaen.

Results

- Match 1: Ham-Kam 2–1 Drøbak/Frogn
- Match 2: Strømmen 4–4 Ham-Kam
- Match 3: Drøbak/Frogn 2–0 Strømmen

Pos	Team	Pld	W	D	L	GF	GA	GD	Pts	Qualification or relegation
1	Ham-Kam (O)	2	1	1	0	6	5	+1	4	Remained in the Tippeligaen
2	Drøbak-Frogn	2	1	0	1	3	2	+1	3	Remained in the First Division
3	Strømmen	2	0	1	1	4	6	−2	1	Remained in the First Division

(O) Play-off winners

== Results ==
Home \ Away	BRA	HAM	KON	LIL	LYN	MJØ	MOL	ROS	SOG	IKS	TRO	VIK
Brann	—	3–1	0–0	0–0	1–0	2–0	2–3	1–1	2–2	0–1	1–1	3–1
HamKam	3–1	—	1–2	1–4	0–2	3–1	3–0	1–1	2–2	1–1	3–0	0–0
Kongsvinger	3–3	3–0	—	5–2	1–0	6–2	3–0	1–0	5–0	1–3	0–2	4–1
Lillestrøm	4–1	4–0	1–0	—	1–1	1–2	1–2	1–1	3–3	3–2	6–0	2–1
Lyn	1–1	2–1	3–2	3–1	—	1–0	1–1	1–3	7–3	1–2	2–1	3–1
Mjøndalen	1–1	3–2	0–2	0–4	0–1	—	0–4	0–1	1–1	1–0	0–1	2–2
Molde	1–1	4–1	0–2	0–4	2–1	2–0	—	2–0	3–0	0–1	1–0	0–0
Rosenborg	2–0	5–2	6–0	3–1	2–0	1–2	2–0	—	5–1	6–0	6–1	5–2
Sogndal	1–1	3–1	1–0	0–1	1–2	1–0	0–1	1–3	—	1–2	3–0	4–1
Start	0–0	4–0	0–1	2–2	5–0	4–1	2–1	0–4	4–1	—	1–0	1–1
Tromsø	3–1	0–3	1–1	1–0	0–0	0–3	1–3	1–1	6–0	2–2	—	1–0
Viking	1–1	1–1	1–1	0–2	0–1	2–1	5–0	1–0	3–1	1–1	0–0	—

Source: NIFS (in Norwegian)
Legend: Blue = home team win; Yellow = draw; Red = away team win.

== Season statistics ==
=== Top scorers ===
Rank	Player	Club	Goals
1	(Norway) Kjell Roar Kaasa	Kongsvinger	17
2	(Norway) Frank Strandli	Start	16
3	(Norway) Tore André Dahlum	Rosenborg	13
4	(Norway) Ole Bjørn Sundgot	Molde	12
4	(Norway) Gøran Sørloth	Rosenborg	12
6	(Scotland) Stuart McManus	Lillestrøm	11
6	(Norway) Kenneth Nysæther	Lillestrøm	11
8	(Norway) Arild Tønnessen	Start	9
8	(Norway) Per Ivar Fornes	Mjøndalen	9
8	(Norway) Stein Amundsen	Lyn	9
8	(Norway) Jostein Flo	Sogndal	9

=== Attendances ===
Pos	Team	Total	High	Low	Average	Change
1	Rosenborg	149,261	24,023	8,002	13,569	+18.5%
2	Brann	107,382	20,292	6,743	9,762	−15.5%
3	Viking	85,743	13,103	4,419	7,795	−20.0%
4	Start	65,960	10,253	2,902	5,996	−10.1%
5	Lillestrøm	55,760	12,652	2,830	5,069	+35.2%
6	Molde	45,465	8,099	2,450	4,133	+25.3%
7	Lyn	43,068	11,417	1,503	3,915	−8.0%
8	Tromsø	42,402	6,448	1,893	3,855	−15.1%
9	HamKam	36,515	6,344	1,738	3,320	n/a^{1}
10	Kongsvinger	34,749	5,364	2,164	3,159	+20.1%
11	Mjøndalen	25,771	7,942	917	2,343	n/a^{1}
12	Sogndal	22,876	3,682	1,475	2,080	−5.8%
	League total	714,952	24,023	917	5,416	−4.2%

Source: nifs.no
Notes:
1: Team played last season in 1. divisjon.
