= 1966 in Norway =

- Centuries: 18th; 19th; 20th; 21st
- Decades: 1940s; 1950s; 1960s; 1970s; 1980s
- See also: List of years in Norway

The following is a list of events that occurred in Norway within the year 1966.

== Incumbents ==
- Monarch – Olav V.
- President of the Storting – Bernt Ingvaldsen (Conservative)
- Prime Minister – Per Borten (Centre)

== Events ==
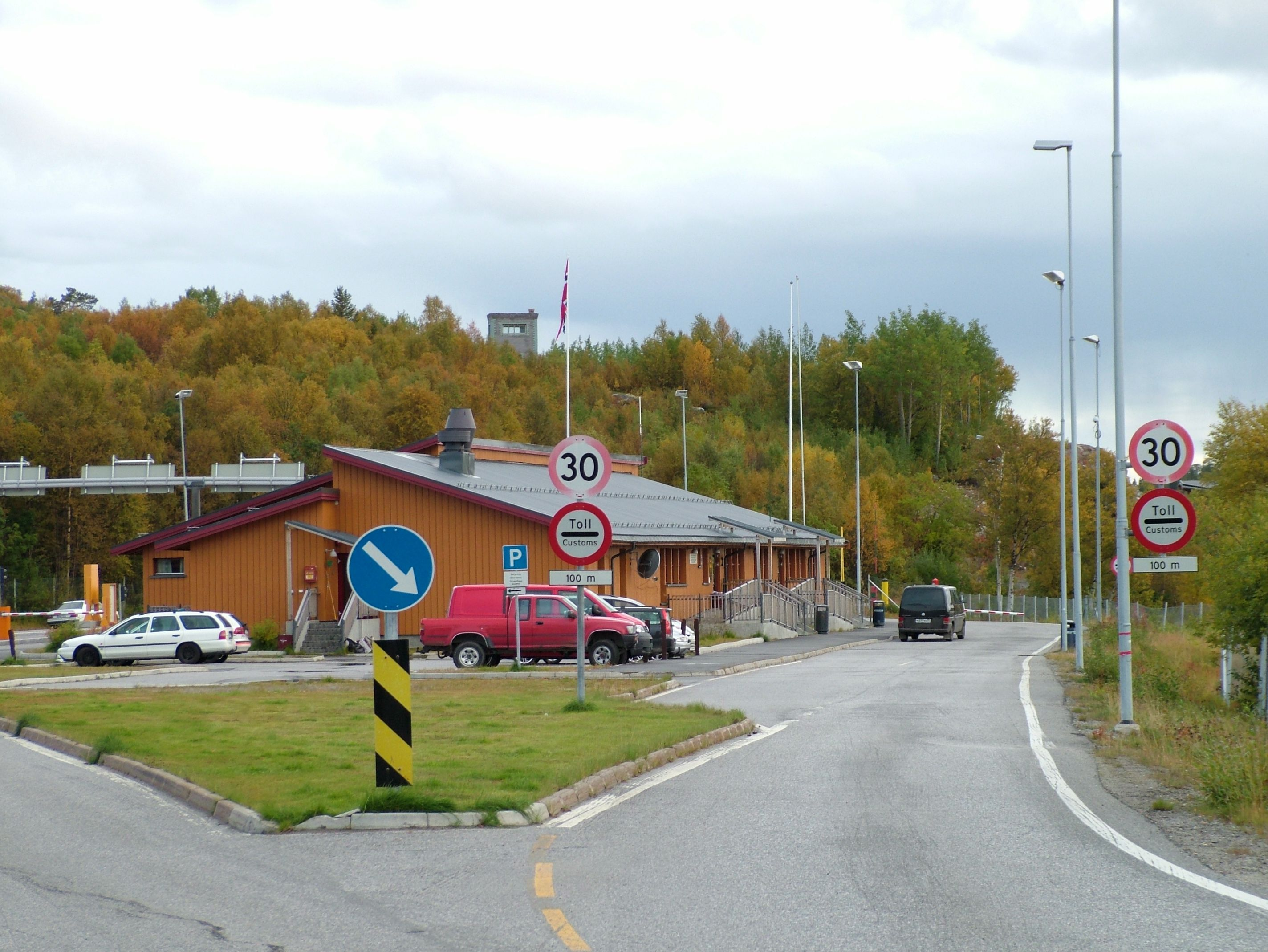
The Storskog border control between Norway and the Soviet Union is opened

- 7 August – The Storskog border control between Norway and the Soviet Union is opened. It remains the only legal border crossing from Norway to Russia till this day.
- 26 June – Kristiansand Zoo opens.

=== Sports ===
- 17–27 February – the 1966 Nordic World Ski Championships were held in Holmenkollen, Oslo. Norway finishes atop the medals table.
- The first Bislett Games were held at Bislett Stadium in Oslo.

=== Music ===
- Arne Bendiksen – "Intet er nytt under solen", performed by Åse Kleveland in the Eurovision Song Contest 1966
- Harald Sæverud – Symphony no 9

=== Literature ===
- Karin Bang, poet and novelist, is awarded the Riksmål Society Literature Prize.
- Ebba Haslund, novelist, is awarded the Norwegian Booksellers' Prize for the novel Det trange hjerte.

== Notable births ==
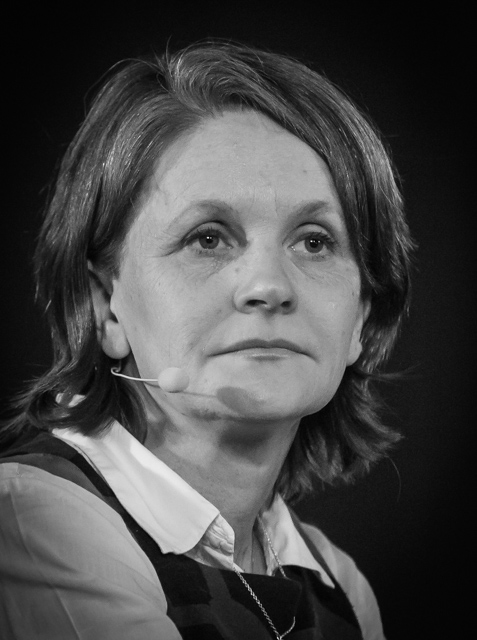
Hanne Skartveit

- 2 January – Jørgen Neumann, footballer.
- 6 January – Anne Katrine Bang, novelist.
- 8 January – Trude Dybendahl, cross-country skier (died 2024).
- 14 January – Linda Verdal, politician.
- 14 January – Eirik Wekre, crime writer.
- 27 January – Edel Therese Høiseth, speed skater.
- 31 January – Anne Berge, alpine skier.
- 4 February – Asbjørn Helgeland, footballer.
- 8 February – Tor Fosse, footballer (died 2024).
- 9 February – Stein Amundsen, footballer.
- 9 February – Harald Eia, comedian.
- 14 February – Tore Nordseth, politician.
- 14 February – Thorleif Fluer Vikre, politician.
- 15 February – Stephen Ackles, musician (died 2023).
- 16 February – Bergljot Webster, Supreme Court justice.
- 17 February – Atle Skårdal, alpine skier.
- 23 February – Tone Wilhelmsen Trøen, politician.
- 3 March – Håkon Särnblom, high jumper.
- 3 March – Tor Thodesen, footballer and manager.
- 5 March – Rangdi Krogstad, politician.
- 7 March – Bjørn Tore Hansen, footballer.
- 8 March – Ulf Karlsen, footballer.
- 10 March – Petter Thoresen, orienteer.
- 11 March – Vebjørn Sand, painter.
- 12 March – Toril Hoch-Nielsen, footballer.
- 19 March – Jan-Paul Brekke, sociologist and comedian.
- 24 March – Erling Jevne, cross-country skier.
- 29 March – Marit Adeleide Andreassen, actress.
- 4 April – Finn Christian Jagge, alpine skier (died 2020).
- 5 April – Trond Lossius, audio artist.
- 7 April – Morgan Andersen, ice hockey player and football executive.
- 7 April – Kathrine Kleveland, politician.
- 11 April – Tom Fodstad, footballer.
- 12 April – Nils-Olav Johansen, jazz guitarist.
- 13 April – Hanne Skartveit, journalist.
- 14 April – Terje Halleland, politician.
- 15 April – Joar Eidheim, military officer.
- 16 April – Sture Sivertsen, cross-country skier.
- 16 April – Jarle Vespestad, jazz drummer.
- 18 April – Trine Hattestad, javelin thrower.
- 22 April – Arve Høiberg, politician.
- 22 April – Petter Solli, footballer.
- 27 April – Siw Anita Andersen, revue actress.
- 28 April – Vegard Skogheim, footballer.
- 30 April – Stine Lise Hattestad, freestyle skier.
- 30 April – Ivo de Figueiredo, historian, biographer and literary critic.
- 2 May – Øyvind Rimbereid, author and poet.
- 6 May – Knut Jørgen Røed Ødegaard, astronomer.
- 6 May – Svein Harry Schöttker-Hauge, actor.
- 7 May – Gard Eidsvold, actor.
- 10 May – Anne Elvebakk, biathlete.
- 18 May – Bent Skammelsrud, footballer.
- 19 May – Jonny Finstad, politician.
- 20 May – Per-Ove Ludvigsen, footballer.
- 21 May – Kjell-Idar Juvik, politician.
- 22 May – Siri Eftedal, handballer.
- 22 May – Ivar Michal Ulekleiv, biathlete.
- 28 May – Bjørnar Skjæran, politician.
- 9 June – Reidun Seth, footballer.
- 10 June – Susanne Bratli, politician (born in Sweden).
- 16 June – Lars Rem, politician.
- 19 June – Silje Nergaard, singer.
- 29 June – Dagfinn Henrik Olsen, politician.
- 5 July – Siri Dokken, comic artist and illustrator.
- 11 July – Arnfinn Bårdsen, judge.
- 14 July – Hans Petter Laberg, young adult fiction writer.
- 14 July – Brynjar Lia, historian.
- 17 July – Hallvard Holmen, actor.
- 20 July – Marit Voldsæter, comedian.
- 21 July – Lars Fiske, comic artist and illustrator.
- 22 July – Hilde Hodnefjeld, illustrator and children's writer.
- 23 July – Birthe Hegstad, footballer.
- 24 July – Jørn Jamtfall, footballer.
- 28 July – Roger Strøm, speed skater.
- 31 July – Per Martinsen, musician.
- 1 August – Olaf Thommessen, businessperson and politician.
- 3 August – Marianne Hagen, politician.
- 7 August – Torstein Ellingsen, jazz drummer.
- 9 August – Linn Ullmann, novelist.
- 10 August – Nicolai Tangen, investment banker.
- 11 August – Kristin Skogen Lund, businessperson.
- 12 August – Anne Grethe Hauan, politician.
- 14 August – Karl-Petter Løken, footballer (born in Sweden).
- 14 August – Bjarne Sognnæs, footballer.
- 17 August – John Halvorsen, long-distance runner.
- 29 August – Karine Haaland, comic artist and illustrator.
- 31 August – Jan Einar Thorsen, alpine skier.
- 2 September – Fredrik Skavlan, talk show host.
- 4 September – Kristin Eide, handballer.
- 8 September – Roger Ingebrigtsen, politician.
- 8 September – Lene Natasha Lind, diplomat.
- 10 September – Ragnar Aalbu, illustrator and children's writer.
- 11 September – Rita Ottervik, politician.
- 13 September – Lars Andersen, diplomat.
- 13 September – Ken Hasle, footballer.
- 14 September – Tom Willy Rustad, accordionist.
- 15 September – Håvard Gimse, cellist.
- 16 September – Ole Petter Pollen, yacht racer.
- 21 September – Britt Giske Andersen, politician.
- 28 September – Alvhild Hedstein, politician.
- 28 September – André Løvestam, businessperson
- 3 October – Gjert Rognli, artist.
- 8 October – Turid Kristensen, politician.
- 18 October – Gjertrud Jynge, actress.
- 20 October – Trine Svensen, actress.
- 21 October – Arne Sandstø, footballer and manager.
- 23 October – Leif Nordli, footballer and manager.
- 25 October – Helge Orten, politician.
- 27 October – Helene Falch Fladmark, politician.
- 27 October – Hege Nerland, politician (died 2007)
- 2 November – Geir Mo, politician.
- 7 November – Trond Giske, politician.
- 8 November – Solveig Torsteinsen, designer.
- 9 November – Yassine Arakia, politician.
- 19 November – Morten Ivarsen, canoe racer.
- 24 November – Børre Meinseth, footballer.
- 25 November – Hans Olav Syversen, politician.
- 28 November – Leif Rune Salte, footballer.
- 3 December – Ida Helene Steen, geomicrobiologist.
- 6 December – Jorunn Horgen, windsurfer.
- 13 December – Geir Hågen Karlsen, politician.
- 18 December – Harald Jensen, sport shooter.
- 19 December – Sylvia Brustad, politician.
- 25 December – Ståle Oldeide, footballer.
- 25 December – Torkil Åmland, politician.
- 30 December – Ole Erik Stavrum, footballer.

=== Full date unknown ===
- Ole Petter Wie, businessperson

== Notable deaths ==
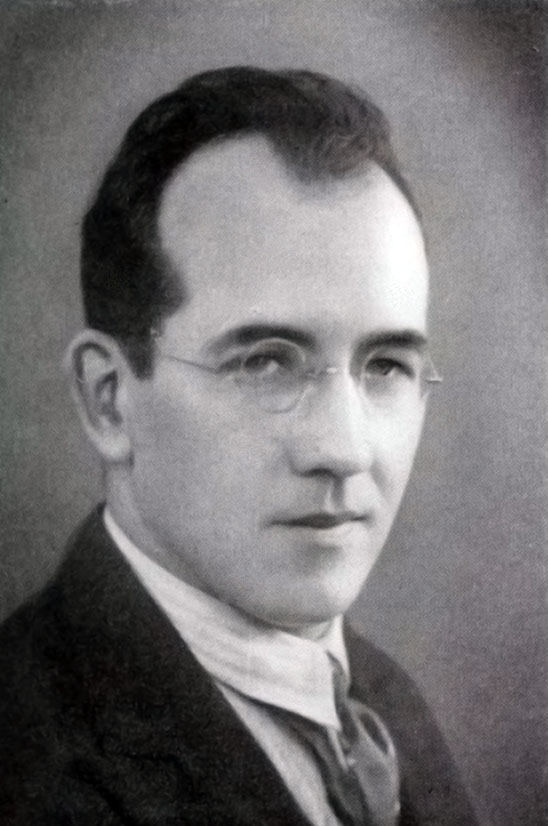
Rolf Hofmo

- 2 January – Oscar Thorstensen, footballer (born 1901).
- 15 January – Birger Braadland, politician (born 1879).
- 19 January – Wilhelm Swensen, architect (born 1894).
- 23 January – Asbjørn Aamodt, painter and illustrator (born 1893).
- 24 January – Arvid G. Hansen, journalist and politician (born 1894).
- 24 January – Karl Ingolf Sørensen, politician (born 1899).
- 3 February – Ivar Navelsaker, military officer (born 1893).
- 9 March – Mary Archer Heggen, painter (born 1872).
- 18 March – Eivind Eckbo, barrister and businessperson (born 1873; died in Denmark).
- 18 March – Einar Skjæraasen, poet (born 1900).
- 23 March – Einar Pettersen, sport wrestler (born 1897).
- 24 March – Morten Ansgar Kveim, pathologist (born 1892)
- 26 March – Wilhelm Engel Bredal, politician (born 1907).
- 2 April – Sverre Hope, politician (born 1902).
- 6 April – Hans Engen, journalist, diplomat and politician (born 1912)
- 10 April – Jens Marcus Mottré, politician (born 1886)
- 22 April – Aslaug Blytt, art historian (born 1899).
- 29 April – Rolf Bergersen, sport shooter (born 1906).
- 7 May – Haakon Faanes, engineer (born 1884).
- 11 May – Rolf Hofmo, politician and sports official (born 1898).
- 13 May – Henrik Adam Due, violinist (born 1891).
- 16 May – Torstein Torsteinson, painter (born 1876).
- 26 May – Helga Eng, psychologist and educationalist (born 1875).
- 28 May – Harry Haraldsen, speed skater (born 1911)
- 6 June – Hans Ingvald Hansen Ratvik, politician (born 1883).
- 14 June – Henny Dons, missionary leader (born 1874).
- 5 July – Ole Jørgensen, politician (born 1897).
- 5 July – Anders Moen, gymnast (born 1887)
- 7 July – Bertel Andreas Grimeland, school owner and sports official (born 1875).
- 8 July – Per Tuff, veterinarian (born 1878).
- 14 July – Johan Gaarder, footballer (born 1893).
- 14 July – Nils Andresson Lavik, politician (born 1884).
- 17 July – Nils Dahl, middle-distance runner (born 1882)
- 23 July – Helge Groth, literary historian and diplomat (born 1913).
- 5 August – Halvard Olsen, politician and trade unionist (born 1886).
- 16 August – Carl Klæth, gymnast (born 1887)
- 17 August – Niels Christian Brøgger, writer (born 1883).
- 20 August – Marie Ingeborg Skau, politician (born 1890).
- 26 August – Nils Asheim, politician (born 1895).
- 30 August – Elise Hambro, educator (born 1881).
- 30 August – Marius Røhne, landscape architect (born 1883).
- 13 September – Johannes Ballestad, painter (born 1903).
- 13 September – Alfred Engelsen, gymnast (born 1893)
- 19 September – Gustav Edén, footballer (born 1891).
- 27 September – Hallvard Blekastad, painter (born 1883).
- October – Terje Strand, illustrator (born 1896).
- 4 October – Arne Kvidbergskår, sculptor (born 1888).
- 8 October – Johan Sirnes, designer (born 1883).
- 10 October – Kristian Albert Christiansen, politician (born 1888).
- 13 October – Ernst G. Mortensen, school owner and book publisher (born 1887).
- 13 October – Asbjørn Øverås, educator (b.1896)
- 15 October – Jon Andrå, politician (born 1888).
- 27 October – Agnes Berle, hotelier (born 1879).
- 29 October – Margrethe Parm, scouting leader (born 1882).
- 6 November – Theodor Hald, radio presenter (born 1886).
- 10 November – Theodor Hesselberg, meteorologist (born 1885).
- 23 November – Einar Nordlie, footballer (born 1896).
- 25 November – Hans Reidar Holtermann, military officer (born 1895).
- 2 December – Conrad Wilhelm Eger, industrialist (born 1880).
- 2 December – Finn Koren, diplomat (born 1875).
- 2 December – Oscar Røine, trade unionist (born 1888).
- 8 December – Einar Pihler, painter and illustrator (born 1897).
- 13 December – Ingvald Johannes Jaklin, politician (born 1896).
- 20 December – Aslaug Låstad Lygre, poet (born 1910).
- 23 December – Martin Bernhart Veen, politician (born 1905).
- 24 December – Thorvald Kierulf, forester (born 1890).
- 26 December – Christopher Dahl, yacht racer (born 1898)
- 28 December – Einar Oscar Schou, architect (born 1877).
- 30 December – Erling Eide, forester (born 1890).
