= 1997 Norwegian First Division =

1. divisjon
- Season: 1997
- Dates: 20 April – 12 October
- Champions: Vålerenga
- Promoted: Vålerenga; Moss
- Relegated: Runar; Drøbak/Frogn; Harstad; Sarpsborg
- Matches played: 182
- Goals scored: 540 (2.97 per match)
- Top goalscorer: Espen Musæus (16 goals)

The 1997 1. divisjon, Norway's second-tier football league, began play on 20 April 1997 and ended on 12 October 1997. The league was contested by 14 teams, and the top two teams won promotion to Tippeligaen, while the third placed played a promotion-playoff against the 12th-placed team in Tippeligaen to win promotion. The bottom four teams were relegated to the 2. divisjon.

Vålerenga and Moss won promotion to Tippeligaen, while Eik-Tønsberg lost the promotion-playoff against Tromsø. Runar, Drøbak/Frogn, Harstad and Sarpsborg was relegated to the 2. divisjon.

== League table ==
| Pos | Team | Pld | W | D | L | GF | GA | GD | Pts | Promotion, qualification or relegation |
|---|---|---|---|---|---|---|---|---|---|---|
| 1 | Vålerenga (C, P) | 26 | 19 | 3 | 4 | 70 | 21 | +49 | 60 | Promotion to Tippeligaen |
| 2 | Moss (P) | 26 | 19 | 2 | 5 | 52 | 27 | +25 | 59 | Promotion to Tippeligaen |
| 3 | Eik-Tønsberg | 26 | 11 | 7 | 8 | 43 | 34 | +9 | 40 | Qualification for the promotion play-offs |
| 4 | Start | 26 | 11 | 7 | 8 | 41 | 44 | −3 | 40 | |
| 5 | Odd Grenland | 26 | 11 | 6 | 9 | 39 | 36 | +3 | 39 | |
| 6 | Byåsen | 26 | 11 | 4 | 11 | 42 | 36 | +6 | 37 | |
| 7 | Hødd | 26 | 11 | 3 | 12 | 35 | 40 | −5 | 36 | |
| 8 | HamKam | 26 | 9 | 8 | 9 | 40 | 34 | +6 | 35 | |
| 9 | Bryne | 26 | 10 | 5 | 11 | 46 | 42 | +4 | 35 | |
| 10 | Aalesund | 26 | 11 | 2 | 13 | 36 | 36 | 0 | 35 | |
| 11 | Runar (R) | 26 | 10 | 4 | 12 | 35 | 45 | −10 | 34 | Relegation to Second Division |
| 12 | Drøbak/Frogn (R) | 26 | 6 | 6 | 14 | 21 | 47 | −26 | 24 | Relegation to Second Division |
| 13 | Harstad (R) | 26 | 4 | 8 | 14 | 21 | 52 | −31 | 20 | Relegation to Second Division |
| 14 | Sarpsborg (R) | 26 | 5 | 3 | 18 | 19 | 46 | −27 | 18 | Relegation to Second Division |

Source: nifs.no
Rules for classification: 1) points; 2) goal difference; 3) number of goals scored.
(C) Champions; (P) Promoted; (R) Relegated

== Results ==
| Home \ Away | AAL | BRY | BYÅ | D/F | EIK | HAM | HAR | ILH | MOS | ODD | RUN | SAR | IKS | VÅL |
|---|---|---|---|---|---|---|---|---|---|---|---|---|---|---|
| Aalesund | — | 0–2 | 0–3 | 3–0 | 1–2 | 3–0 | 3–1 | 4–2 | 0–1 | 3–0 | 2–0 | 3–0 | 1–3 | 1–2 |
| Bryne | 0–1 | — | 1–5 | 1–2 | 3–1 | 1–0 | 7–0 | 1–2 | 1–2 | 0–0 | 1–2 | 1–0 | 5–5 | 1–1 |
| Byåsen | 2–1 | 3–2 | — | 3–0 | 1–3 | 1–0 | 1–1 | 0–1 | 1–3 | 1–1 | 3–2 | 2–0 | 2–0 | 2–3 |
| Drøbak/Frogn | 0–1 | 0–2 | 1–3 | — | 0–3 | 0–0 | 1–3 | 3–0 | 0–5 | 3–2 | 1–0 | 1–1 | 1–4 | 1–2 |
| Eik-Tønsberg | 3–1 | 1–0 | 1–1 | 0–0 | — | 2–2 | 2–0 | 0–0 | 0–1 | 0–1 | 1–1 | 1–2 | 4–0 | 0–6 |
| HamKam | 4–1 | 2–2 | 2–1 | 0–0 | 4–2 | — | 4–0 | 0–0 | 0–1 | 2–3 | 5–3 | 0–1 | 0–0 | 0–2 |
| Harstad | 1–2 | 2–2 | 1–1 | 1–1 | 0–2 | 1–1 | — | 2–0 | 0–4 | 1–4 | 0–0 | 0–1 | 0–0 | 3–1 |
| Hødd | 3–0 | 5–1 | 3–1 | 3–1 | 1–3 | 0–3 | 0–0 | — | 2–1 | 1–3 | 2–3 | 1–0 | 2–1 | 0–2 |
| Moss | 1–0 | 1–2 | 3–2 | 2–0 | 2–2 | 2–0 | 5–0 | 1–0 | — | 1–3 | 1–1 | 2–1 | 2–1 | 2–1 |
| Odd Grenland | 1–1 | 2–3 | 1–0 | 0–1 | 1–1 | 1–2 | 2–0 | 3–1 | 1–3 | — | 2–3 | 4–2 | 1–3 | 0–0 |
| Runar | 3–1 | 0–1 | 1–0 | 2–1 | 1–3 | 0–0 | 2–1 | 3–0 | 0–1 | 0–1 | — | 2–1 | 1–3 | 0–2 |
| Sarpsborg | 0–2 | 0–5 | 0–1 | 0–1 | 1–0 | 1–5 | 1–3 | 0–1 | 1–2 | 0–1 | 2–4 | — | 2–2 | 0–0 |
| Start | 1–1 | 2–1 | 2–1 | 1–1 | 1–4 | 1–4 | 3–0 | 0–4 | 2–1 | 1–1 | 2–1 | 1–0 | — | 2–0 |
| Vålerenga | 1–0 | 3–0 | 3–1 | 5–1 | 3–2 | 5–0 | 2–0 | 4–1 | 6–2 | 3–0 | 8–0 | 1–2 | 4–0 | — |

Source: NIFS (in Norwegian)
Legend: Blue = home team win; Yellow = draw; Red = away team win.

== Top goalscorers ==
| Rank | Player | Club | Goals |
|---|---|---|---|
| 1 | (Norway) Espen Musæus | Vålerenga | 16 |
| 2 | (Norway) Espen Haug | Vålerenga | 14 |
| 3 | (Norway) John Erik Ødegaard | Byåsen | 13 |
| 3 | (Norway) Tommy Sylte | Moss | 13 |
| 5 | (Norway) Bengt Sæternes | Odd Grenland | 12 |
| 5 | (Norway) Caleb Francis | Bryne | 12 |
| 5 | (Norway) Erling Ytterland | Aalesund | 12 |
| 8 | (Norway) Fredrik Thorsen | Runar | 11 |
| 8 | (Norway) Jarle Raastad | Runar | 11 |
| 10 | (Norway) Bjørn Tore Hansen | Aalesund | 9 |
| 10 | (Norway) Kjell Roar Kaasa | Vålerenga | 9 |
| 10 | (Norway) Krister Isaksen | Start | 9 |

== See also ==
- 1997 Tippeligaen
- 1997 2. divisjon
- 1997 3. divisjon
