= Van den Steen =

van den Steen is a surname. Notable people with this name include:

- Cornelius a Lapide (1567 – 1637), born Cornelis Cornelissen van den Steen, Flemish Jesuit and exegete
- Eric J. van den Steen, Belgian-American economist
- Kelly Van den Steen, a Belgian racing cyclist
- Maria de Villegas de Saint-Pierre, also as Countess Maria Van den Steen de Jehay (1870–1941), Belgian writer

== See also ==
- Van der Steen
