= Caleb Francis =

Norwegian footballer (born 1968)

Personal information
- Date of birth: 8 February 1968 (age 58)
- Place of birth: Mauritius
- Height: 1.80 m (5 ft 11 in)
- Positions: Midfielder; striker

Youth career
- Lillehammer

Senior career*
Years	Team	Apps	(Gls)
1985–1987	Lillehammer		
1988	Kongsvinger	2	(0)
1989	Fremad		
1990–1995	Kongsvinger	99	(18)
1996–1998	Bryne		
1999–2000	Kongsvinger	34	(5)
2000–2002	Ull/Kisa		
2003	Larvik		

Managerial career
- 2007–2008: Runar
- * Club domestic league appearances and goals

Caleb Francis (born 8 February 1968) is a Norwegian former professional footballer who played as a midfielder. He was born in Mauritius, and spent most of his career at Kongsvinger, Bryne and Ull/Kisa. After retiring as an active player he has worked as both a football commentator and coach.

== Early career ==
Francis hails from Mauritius. His family moved to Norway in 1976, settling in Lillehammer. After three seasons in Lillehammer FK, he was contacted by Mjøndalen IF and Kongsvinger IL about a transfer, and chose Kongsvinger.

Francis made his debut on the first tier against Strømmen IF. He then made his first start away against Vålerengens IF on 26 June 1988. However, his performance was hampered by racist abuse from the stands. Wrote journalist Kjetil Siem of Vålerengen's supporters; "About thirty of them should be severely ashamed, and think about how they hurt themselves, football and not the least Vålerengen with their preopsterous behaviour. Dark-skinned Caleb Francis was not allowed to touch the ball once without being pelted by verbal abuse, in the shape of booing and invectives. That sort of behaviour should not occur, and is a shame to listen to". Siem compared the incident to abuse towards Ruud Gullit during Euro 1988. Osloavisen went even further, calling the fan behaviour "sickening" and a "Clearly racist and meaningless demeanor". In addition to verbal abuse, some supporters tossed bananas at Francis to make allusions to monkeys. The psychological effect caused a lacklustre performance from Francis, who was substituted off to be somewhat spared. Verdens Gang claimed that the number of abusers was around 15, and quoted Francis: "They may be reacting that way because they have failed in one way or another". A Vålerengen player stated that the abusers "maybe not were racists", but that the club needed to condemn it strongly.

The episode was among the key points in Vålerengen's organised fans transitioning from the more hooligan-associated group "Apeberget" to the modern supporter club "Klanen", which was founded in 1991, and eventually took a strictly anti-racist stance. Politician Abid Raja linked the incident to anti-immigrant activist Arne Myrdal making a stir around the same time.

The day after the Vålerengen match, Francis did not leave his apartment, where a person from the club made a distress visit. He also quit school, deciding to give up top-tier football and enter the compulsory military service. However, Kongsvinger IL people persuaded him to continue his career. Francis would play for the Lillehammer-based team Fremad while finishing up his military service at Gardermoen.

== Eliteserien career ==
In 1990 Francis played for Kongsvinger's recruit team, but was allowed to join the first team for their pre-season training camp in Viborg, Denmark. Travelling to Denmark with the MV Stena Saga, the vessel was the first responder to the MS Scandinavian Star fire, which the Kongsvinger players then witnessed. Francis played in defence in friendly matches in Denmark, and played 75 minutes of the ultimate pre-season friendly. He finally returned to league action in July 1990. The season was cut short, however, when he sustained a knee injury in the cup on 15 August.

In 1991, Francis made his breakthrough in the first team, being a regular first-team player more or less until 1995. Kongsvinger had a particularly strong start of the 1991 Eliteserien season, which saw Francis in top of the goalscoring table after 5 matches. Kongsvinger found themselves in second place after 9 matches, the coach stating that the team had found players on another level: Dag Riisnæs, Ole Einar Martinsen and Caleb Francis.

While the 1991 season only ended in 8th place, Kongsvinger became runners-up in the 1992 Eliteserien, qualifying the team for the 1993–94 UEFA Cup. Caleb Francis scored in the first UEFA Cup round as Kongsvinger beat Östers IF by a large margin. In the second round, Kongsvinger surprised by holding Juventus FC to 1–1 at home; Francis was carried off the field after 50 minutes, when he duelled with Sergio Porrini and possibly strained an ankle ligament. Francis returned to the away leg, where he was yellow-carded as Kongsvinger succumbed 2–0.

Kongsvinger managed to sign a succession of good strikers to play alongside Francis in offence. After the 1992 season, Kongsvinger lost Kjell Roar Kaasa, but acquired Geir Frigård; though Kongsvinger struggled in the 1993 Eliteserien, VG called Francis and Frigård "Norway's most colourful forward line".

Frigård left ahead of the 1995 season and was replaced by Vidar Riseth which according to VG gave Francis and Riseth the chance to show that they could hold their own and ascent from a status as "quicklime", meaning a squad player. Kongsvinger fought against relegation, and after playing his 100th Eliteserien game in October 1995, Francis did not receive an offer to extend his contract with Kongsvinger. He was brought on a training camp in China, signing a new deal with Bryne FK the day before departure.

== Bryne and return to Kongsvinger ==
In 1998, Francis showed good form, among others with a hat-trick in only 6 minutes against Ullern. He became the top goalscorer in the Norwegian First Division, but could not agree to new contract in Bryne. As Francis refused a contract offer, Bryne decided not to offer him a more lucrative one. He rejoined Kongsvinger.

== Late playing career and post-football ==
In the summer of 2000 he left Kongsvinger for the last time to work as a football commentator in Eurosport. He also signed a contract with Ullensaker/Kisa IL. In 2002, he was hired as a commentator for Canal + together with Claus Eftevaag. He left Ullensaker/Kisa after the season, joined Larvik Fotball to contest the 2003 2. divisjon and lived in a flat in Stavern. He also worked as a teacher. However, he soon lost his job, and broke a leg in a Larvik match in September 2003. On New Year's Eve, his house burned down while he was away. Frustrated, he announced his probable retirement from football, but was hired as a commentator in TV 2 one week after losing his house. He stayed in TV 2 for several years.

He also began a coaching career. He first trained the junior team of Larvik club Halsen IF for two years. Ahead of the 2007 season he was hired as joint head coach (with Richard Berg) of IL Runar. He left in late 2008 after steering the club to promotion.

Francis was also hobby DJ during his football career. While living in Rogaland, he was a part of the group Static.
