= Bakkerud =

Bakkerud is a surname. Notable people with the surname include:

- Andreas Bakkerud (born 1991), Norwegian rallycross driver
- Christian Bakkerud (1984–2011), Danish race car driver
- Elin Bakkerud (born 1973), Norwegian soccer player
- Ingvild Bakkerud (born 1995), Norwegian handball player
- Lars Bakkerud (born 1971), Norwegian soccer player
- Odd Bakkerud (1931–1989), Norwegian fiddle player
