= Steene (surname) =

Steene is a surname.

Notable people with the surname include:

- Birgitta Steene (1928–2023), American scholar on Scandinavian entertainment history
- James Steene (fl. 1818–1862), Irish-Canadian politician
- Johan Steene (born 1973), Swedish ultramarathon runner
- Jonas Van de Steene (born 1987), Belgian Para-cyclist
- Oscar Steene (born 2003), Australian rules footballer for Collingwood
- William Steene (1887–1965), American painter and muralist

== See also ==
- Steen (surname), list of people with the surname
