= Ken Hasle =

Norwegian footballer (born 1966)

Personal information
- Date of birth: 13 September 1966 (age 60)
- Positions: Left back; midfielder

Youth career
- Tjølling

Senior career*
Years	Team	Apps	(Gls)
1984–1987	Tjølling		
1988–1991	Fram		
1992–1993	Brann	41	(0)
1994	Sandefjord BK		
1995	Fram		
1996–1997	Urædd		
1997	Tjølling		
1998–1999	Fram		
2000–2002	Tjølling		
2003	Svarstad		
2004	Larvik Fotball		
2004–2008	Svarstad		
2009–	Tjølling		

Managerial career
- 1995: Fram (playing assistant)
- 1996–1997: Urædd (playing coach)
- 1998–1999: Fram (playing coach)
- 2000–2002: Tjølling (playing coach)
- 2003: Svarstad (playing coach)
- * Club domestic league appearances and goals

Ken Hasle (born 13 September 1966) is a Norwegian footballer who played as a left back.

== Career ==
He grew up in the club Tjølling IF, became a part of its senior squad in 1984 and played on the third tier. Ahead of the 1988 season he was wanted by Larvik Turn, but chose IF Fram.

Ken Hasle and teammate Lars Bakkerud went on trial with SK Brann in the summer of 1991, and both signed for the Eliteserien side after the 1991 season was over. They were reportedly chased by Strømsgodset and Eik-Tønsberg as well. Hasle was declared player of the year in the Larvik district by Østlands-Posten. Left-footed, he was known as a tough physical duel player. He had good stamina, but was also called "a drudge" on the field, with less brilliant technical skills.

Hasle started the 1992 season playing all of the matches, starting some, and scoring his first Brann goal in the cup. His best Eliteserien match came against Mjøndalen in July 1992, when both Bergens Tidende and Bergensavisen named Hasle man of the match. Hasle struggled more in the 1993 season, and felt he was used out of position, in left wing instead of left back. He faced mounting criticism from the Bergen-based press, and in June, the official match program, which was written by the supporters, called Hasle "clumsy" and proposed "a lengthy break" from playing.

He started the 1994 season training with Brann, but was determined to move away from Bergen and complete his higher education. He felt he had achieved what he could in professional football, and while he made a living wage, it would not last through his post-professional years. In late April 1994 he was signed by Sandefjord BK, reportedly on a loan. The team won promotion from the 1994 Norwegian Second Division. Hasle, however, finally moved back to Larvik and signed up as playing assistant coach to Paul Wilson in Fram.

Ahead of the 1996 season he was hired as playing coach of Urædd FK. He would play in central midfield as a playmaker. In 1997 Urædd won their first three league games, and qualified for the cup, but lost six of their seven subsequent league games. Hasle was mostly kept from playing because of several knee surgeries. Hasle was sacked in late August 1997, as Urædd was placed second-to-last in the 1997 Norwegian Third Division. Urædd's season ended with relegation, whereas Hasle ended the 1997 season in Tjølling. Ahead of the 1998 season he signed a one-year contract as playing coach of Fram. Fram ended in second place in the 1998 Norwegian Third Division, which was seen as very satisfactory. The team struggled in 1999, however, and the board refused the use of U20 players on the senior team. Hasle was sacked in August 1999.

He considered returning to Grenland, to play for either Urædd or Pors. He trained with Urædd ahead of both the 2000 and 2001 seasons, but on both occasions he chose to be playing coach of Tjølling. In 2003 he took up the same position in Svarstad IL. The next year he moved on to the new cooperation team in the city, Larvik Fotball. As he withdrew from further play in the summer of 2004, he pleaded with Larvik Turn to join the cooperation team.

Hasle still played by the age of 40, returning to Svarstad IL. He transferred back to Tjølling in 2009, the year he turned 43, and featured for the team into the 2010s. (Note: Ken Hasle at the Norwegian Football Federation (in Norwegian))

== Personal life ==
Having studied psychology, English and history, he worked as a schoolteacher for six years before becoming a salesman. He married in 1994, had twin boys and a daughter.
