= Van der Steen =

Van der Steen is a Dutch toponymic surname meaning "from the stone (house)". Variations on this name are Vandersteen, Van den Steen, Van Steen, Van de(n) Steene, Vandensteene. People with these surnames include:

Van der Steen

- Nicolaes van der Steen (1605–1670), Dutch theologian painted by Frans Hals
- Franciscus van der Steen (1615–1672), Flemish engraver
- Germain Van der Steen (1897–1985), French painter
- Willem van der Steen (1905–1983), Dutch long-distance runner
- Frans Van der Steen (1911–1996), Belgian long-distance runner
- Mensje van der Steen (born 1946), Dutch writer using the pseudonym Mensje van Keulen
- Niels van der Steen (born 1972), Dutch track cyclist
- Jessica Van Der Steen (born 1984), Belgian fashion model
- Wouter van der Steen (born 1990), Dutch footballer

Vandersteen

- Willy Vandersteen (1913–1990), Belgian comics artist, prolific creator of comic books
- Eline Vandersteen (born 1995), Belgian artistic gymnast

Van den Steen

- Cornelis Cornelissen van den Steen (1567–1637), Flemish Jesuit and exegete
- Eric J. van den Steen, Belgian-American economist
- Kelly Van den Steen (born 1995), Belgian racing cyclist

Van den Steen de Jehay

- Charles van den Steen de Jehay (1781–1846), Belgian provincial governor and diplomat
- Werner van den Steen de Jehay (1854–1934), Belgian diplomat
- Maria Van den Steen de Jehay (1870–1941), Belgian writer

Van Steen

- Jean Van Steen (1929–2013), Belgian footballer
- Edla Van Steen (1936–2018), Brazilian journalist, actor and writer
- Gonda Van Steen (born 1964), Belgian-American classical scholar and linguist

van Steen

- Jac van Steen (born 1956), Dutch conductor
- Martin van Steen (born 1969), Dutch road cyclist
- Jop van Steen (born 1984), Dutch footballer

Vandesteene

- Els Vandesteene (born 1987), Belgian volleyballer

== See also ==
- Steen (surname)
- Steen (given name)
