= Louvigny =

Louvigny or Louvigné is the name or part of the name of several communes in France:

- Louvigny, Calvados, in the Calvados département
- Louvigny, Moselle, in the Moselle département
- Louvigny, Pyrénées-Atlantiques, in the Pyrénées-Atlantiques département
- Louvigny, Sarthe, in the Sarthe département
- Louvigné, in the Mayenne département
- Louvigné-de-Bais, in the Ille-et-Vilaine département
- Louvigné-du-Désert, in the Ille-et-Vilaine département
- Louvignies-Quesnoy, in the Nord département

It may also refer to:

== Places and buildings ==
- Chaussée-Notre-Dame-Louvignies in Wallonia, Belgium
- Château de Louvignies a castle in Chaussée-Notre-Dame-Louvignies
- Villa Louvigny, the former headquarters of Compagnie Luxembourgeoise de Télédiffusion, the forerunner of RTL Group
- Louvigny fort, a fort in Luxembourg's former fortress

== People ==
- Louis de La Porte de Louvigny, a French and Canadian military officer in the 17th and 18th centuries
- Jacques Louvigny an early 20th century French stage and film actor
- Jean de Bernieres-Louvigny a 17th-century French mystic
