= Van Steen =

Van Steen is a surname. Notable people with the surname include:

- Edla Van Steen (1936–2018), Brazilian journalist, actress and writer of Belgian-German descent
- Gonda Van Steen (born 1964), Belgian-American classical scholar and linguist
- Jean Van Steen (1929–2013), Belgian footballer

== See also ==
- Jac van Steen (born 1956), Dutch conductor
- Jop van Steen (born 1984), Dutch footballer
- Martin van Steen (born 1969), Dutch road cyclist
- Van der Steen
