= André Løvestam =

Norwegian businessperson (born 1966)

André P. Løvestam (born 28 September 1966) is a Norwegian businessperson.

He worked in the Orkla Group from 1989 to 2000, where he spent the years 1989 - 1994 in various marketing positions before proceeding to Sales Director from 1994 to 1997, and CEO of Orkla's subsidiary Sætre from 1997 to 2000. He was then recruited to Tomra in 2000, and was CEO of Tomra Europe from 2002 to 2005. He was CEO of the IT Services companyTeleComputing from April 2006 through February 2009. He lives in Jar.
