= Bjørn Aamodt =

Norwegian seaman, industrial worker and poet

- Born: 24 February 1944; Bærum
- Died: 29 April 2006 (aged 62)
- Education: University of Oslo
- Occupations: Seaman, industrial worker and poet
- Awards: Gyldendal's Endowment (1994); Halldis Moren Vesaas Prize (1997); Dobloug Prize (2003)

Bjørn Aamodt (24 February 1944 – 29 April 2006) was a Norwegian seaman, industrial worker and poet.

== Biography ==
Aamodt was born in Bærum and died in Oslo, Norway. The son of artist and footballer Asbjørn Aamodt, he graduated artium at Valler Gymnasium in 1962 and later studied psychology at the University of Oslo, where he graduated in 1975. Between 1962 and 1972, he worked as a sailor and dockworker. He was later employed as a crane operator and metal worker.

He made his literary debut with the poetry collection Tilegnet in 1973. Aamodt was awarded Gyldendal's Endowment jointly with Kjersti Scheen in 1994, the Halldis Moren Vesaas Prize in 1997, and the Dobloug Prize in 2003. He was twice nominated for the Nordic Council's Literature Prize in 1995 for ABC and again in 1998 for Anchorage.

== Selected works ==
- Tilegnet - 1973
- Knuter, Mulm og andre dikt - 1980
- Stå - 1990
- ABC - 1994
- Anchorage - 1997
- Atom - 2002
- Arbeidsstykker og atten tauverk - 2004
- Avskjed - 2010
