= Vidar Evensen =

Norwegian footballer (born 1971)

Vidar Evensen (born 13 July 1971) is a retired Norwegian football defender.

He started his career in Strindheim and played in the 1. divisjon. Ahead of the 1994 season he moved to Oslo and joined Lyn. He made his debut in April 1994 against his old club, but only recorded 9 league games before returning to Strindheim who were promoted to 1995 Tippeligaen. Following their instant relegation, Evensen went on to another first-tier club, Kongsvinger. He played here from 1996 through 2000 before finishing his professional career in Strømsgodset.

Evensen was linked to foreign clubs numerous times. For instance he trialled with Blackpool and Oldham in 1995, was scouted by Nottingham Forest in 1997, was offered contracts with both Eendracht Aalst and Queens Park Rangers in 1997 which both fell through, and trialled extensively with Barnsley in 1998. During the 2000 Norwegian winter break Evensen and Kenneth Karlsen were loaned out to Widzew Łódź.

Evensen settled in Larvik, and after leaving Strømsgodset he played two seasons for third-tier Larvik. He featured for Tollnes and Notodden in 2006, securing promotion to the first tier. In 2007 he became manager of Ørn-Horten, while also giving himself a role as a squad player. Evensen and Ørn parted after the 2008 season after the club suggested pay cuts. About ten years later he became director of sports in Strindheim, now languishing in lower leagues.
