= Kjersti Scheen =

Norwegian illustrator and writer (1943–2026)

- Born: 17 August 1943; Oslo, Norway
- Died: 8 January 2026 (aged 82)
- Education: Norwegian National Academy of Craft and Art Industry
- Occupations: Illustrator, writer
- Awards: Gyldendal's Endowment (1994)

Kjersti Scheen (17 August 1943 – 8 January 2026) was a Norwegian journalist, illustrator, novelist, crime fiction writer and children's writer. A book illustrator from the mid 1960s, she made her literary debut with the children's picture book Fie og mørket in 1976. She later wrote novels for adults about women with traumatic childhoods, as well as a series of crime novels with Margaret Moss as the principal character.

== Personal life ==
Scheen was born in Oslo on 17 August 1943. Her parents were illustrator Abraham Bøchman Scheen and Marit Rønning. She was married to potter Kyrre Grepp from 1967 to 1971, and from 1983 to Per Otnes. Scheen died on 8 January 2026, at the age of 82.

== Career ==
Scheen studied at the Norwegian National Academy of Craft and Art Industry from 1960 to 1964. She worked as a freelance illustrator from 1963 to 1970, when she was appointed journalist and illustrator for the newspaper Friheten. From 1980 she was a full-time independent writer and illustrator. Scheen made her literary debut in 1976 with the children's book Fie og mørket. This earned her the picture book prize from the Royal Norwegian Ministry of Culture and Equality.

She wrote three humorous easy-to-read books for children, Sofie og pytondagen (1988), Sofie og tøffe Anders (1989), and Sofie og hulesteinen (1990). Later children's books—which she wrote throughout her literary career—were Nattkatten (1998), Marilyn og Mia i den Onde Greves Skog (2000), Britneys hemmelighet (2002), Maja i lakkskobakken (2004), Øyenvitnet (2005), Linnea og kastanjeprisen (2006), Emma 3 og Tore Hund (2007), and Da Simen var spøkelse (2012).

Her first book for adults was the novel Vårmåne (1986), followed by the novels Reisebeskrivelse (1990) and De siste vokterne (1991). These books all had female protagonists with traumatic childhood experiences. In 1992, she wrote her first novel for young adults, I byen – der alt kan skje. This was followed by the novels Kaperøya (1992), Månefeen (1993), where issues like anorexia were highlighted, and Villas vals (1993).Månefeen also earned her the literature prize from the Ministry of Culture.

Her novel Teppefall from 1994 was the first in a series of crime novels featuring ex-actress "Margaret Moss" as the main character. Subsequent crime novels in the series Moss included Ingen applaus for morderen (1996), Englemakerne (1998), Den syvende synd (2000), and Lik i lasta (2003).

Scheen was awarded the Gyldendal's Endowment, a Norwegian literary prize, in 1994 (shared with Bjørn Aamodt). Her books have been translated into several languages. She was a board member of Tegneforbundet from 1977 to 1981, and of the Norwegian Writers for Children from 1989 to 1993.

== Selected works ==
- Fie og mørket (picture book, 1976)
- Vårmåne (novel, 1986)
- Sofie og pytondagen (easy read book, 1988)
- I byen – der alt kan skje (young adult novel, 1992)
- Teppefall (crime novel, 1994); in English, Final Curtain, trans. Louis Muinzer (2002)
- Ingen applaus for morderen (crime novel, 1996)
- Englemakerne (crime novel, 1998)
- Den syvende synd (crime novel, 2000)
- Lik i lasta (crime novel, 2003)
- Ute av bildet (novel, 2006)
