= Elin Bakkerud =

Norwegian footballer (born 1973)

Personal information
- Date of birth: 14 September 1973 (age 53)
- Position: Defender

Senior career*
Years	Team	Apps	(Gls)
–1994	Valestrand		
1995	Bjørnar		
1996–1998	Sandviken		
2000	Larvik	18	(0)

International career
1996	Norway	1	(0)
- * Club domestic league appearances and goals

Elin Bakkerud, née Hopland (born 14 September 1973) is a retired Norwegian football defender.

She started her career in Valestrand. In 1995 she was recruited by then-second-tier team Bjørnar. She played well enough to earn a transfer to first-tier teamn IL Sandviken. Team captain Gro Espeseth praised Bakkerud's pace, tackling, passing and tactical skills. Bakkerud was selected for the Norway women's national football team to face Slovakia in the autumn of 1996, and made her debut in that match. She was also selected for the squad that faced Australia in 1997, but did not play.

She married footballer Lars Bakkerud in the summer of 1996.

In December 1998 her husband signed for Panionios in Greece. The couple moved to Greece together, meaning that Bakkerud left Sandviken. Already in the summer of 1999, though, her husband moved from Panionios to Helsingborgs IF in Sweden. The couple found residence in Helsingør in Denmark, with Elin Bakkerud commencing a nursing education there. Ahead of the 2000 Toppserien, she was contracted by newly promoted club FK Larvik. She would commute from Denmark to Larvik to play matches, while planning to conduct her training sessions with Danish club Hillerød G&I. In total, she played 18 league games and 2 cup games for FK Larvik, scoring 1 cup goal.
