= Ole Einar Martinsen =

Norwegian footballer (born 1967)

Personal information
- Date of birth: 11 March 1967 (age 59)
- Positions: Defender; midfielder

Senior career*
Years	Team	Apps	(Gls)
–1987	Eidsvold Turn		
1988–1992	Kongsvinger	103	(18)
1993	Rosenborg	20	(1)
1994–1996	Kongsvinger	66	(3)
1997–1998	Lillestrøm	39	(0)
1999–2002	Kongsvinger	72	(5)
2003	Larvik		
2004–2006	Langesund/Stathelle		
2007–2008	Stathelle og Omegn		

International career
1992–1993	Norway	2	(0)
- * Club domestic league appearances and goals

Ole Einar Martinsen (born 11 March 1967 is a retired Norwegian football defender.

He joined Kongsvinger from Eidsvold Turn in 1988. After five seasons he played one season for Rosenborg. After three more seasons in Kongsvinger he played two for Lillestrøm, before four ultimate seasons for Kongsvinger. During his last stay the club dropped from the first to the third tier. Martinsen continued in third-tier club Larvik Fotball, then fourth-tier Langesund/Stathelle and sixth-/fifth-tier Stathelle og Omegn.

Martinsen was capped twice for Norway.
