= Espen Musæus =

Norwegian footballer (born 1975)

Personal information
- Full name: Per Espen Musæus
- Date of birth: 21 October 1975 (age 51)
- Place of birth: Norway
- Position: Striker

Youth career
- KFUM

Senior career*
| Years | Team | Apps | (Gls) |
| –1994 | KFUM | | |
| 1995–2001 | Vålerenga | 146 | (52) |
| 2002 | Brann | 4 | (0) |
| 2002–2005 | KFUM | | |
- * Club domestic league appearances and goals

Espen Musæus (born 21 October 1975) is a Norwegian former footballer who played as a striker.

== Early life ==
He was born in 1975 in Norway. He is a native of Oslo, Norway.

== Career ==
He started his career with Norwegian side KFUM. Ahead of the 1995 season he was asked to train with Vålerenga alongside Martin Andresen, and went on to play seven seasons for Vålerenga. He helped the club win the 1997 Norwegian Football Cup. In 2002, he signed for Norwegian side Brann. After that, he signed for his childhood club KFUM.

== Personal life ==
He has been married. He has two sons. He has been nicknamed "Supermusa" ("Supermouse").
