= Alvhild Hedstein =

Norwegian politician

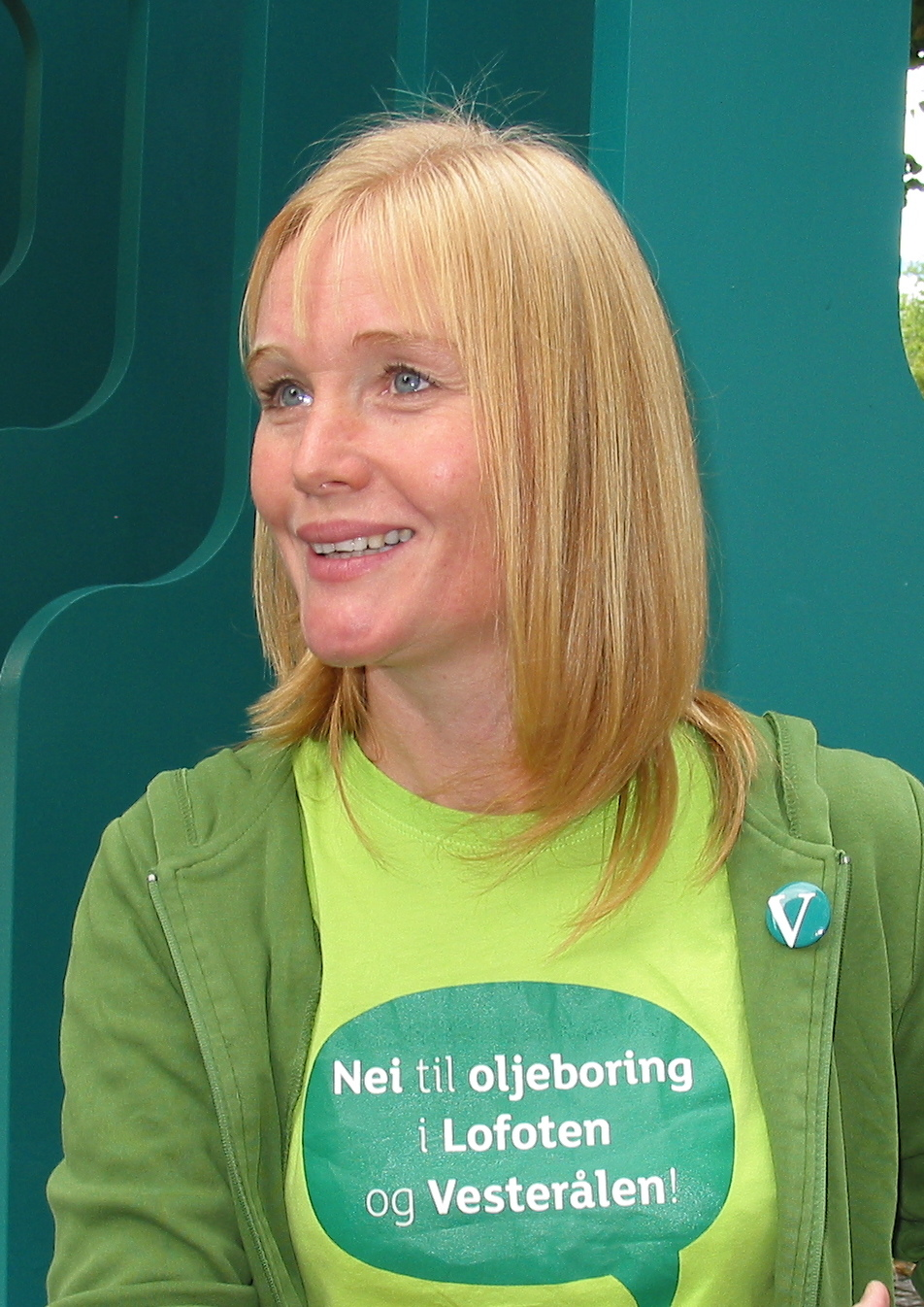
- Alvhild Hedstein during the 2009 election campaign.

Personal details
- Born: 28 September 1966 (age 59) Eidsvoll, Norway
- Party: Liberal Party of Norway
- Education: Norwegian College of Agriculture

Alvhild Hedstein (born 28 September 1966) is a Norwegian environmentalist and politician for the Liberal Party.

== Biography ==
In 2001, during the first cabinet Bondevik, Hedstein was appointed a political advisor in the Ministry of Agriculture. She served as a deputy representative to the Parliament of Norway from Oslo during the terms 2005–2009 and 2009–2013, and has been involved in local politics in Oslo.

Born in Eidsvoll, she took her education at the Norwegian College of Agriculture, and was deputy chair of the Norwegian Christian Student Association. She has worked in the Ministry of the Environment, the Norwegian Pollution Control Authority and the Bellona Foundation. Since 2001 she is the manager of Ecolabelling Norway, a national branch of Nordic Ecolabelling. She was a member of the board of Bellona from 2000 to 2001, and of Norgesgruppen from 2005.
