= Oscar Røine =

Norwegian trade unionist and politician

Oscar Ragnvald Martinius Røine (7 September 1888 – 2 December 1966) was a Norwegian trade unionist and politician for the Labour Party.

He was hired as a mail carrier in Norway Post at a young age. He advanced to postal officer, and from 1921 he was a board member of the Norwegian Union of Postmen, where he was elected as chairman in 1938. During the occupation of Norway by Nazi Germany he endeavored to keep the Union of Postmen from being usurped by the Nazis. His organization was one of forty-three to protest nazification attempts on 15 May 1941, in a letter addressed directly to Reichskommissar Josef Terboven. This protest of the 43 was met with harsh reactions; already on 12 June 1941 two of the protesters were arrested. On 18 June six more protesters were arrested, including Røine and other union leaders. Røine was imprisoned in Møllergata 19 from 12 June to 31 July 1941.

Røine re-assumed his leadership in the Norwegian Union of Postmen after the war ended, but stepped down in 1945 and was given a job as stamp controller. He retired in 1954. Røine was also an elected member of Drammen city council from 1927 to 1936. Despite never practising sports himself, he was a football referee and official within Drammens BK and Buskerud District Association of the Football Association.

In July 1951 Røine was awarded the King's Medal of Merit in silver. He received the highest honorary tokens from the Norwegian Union of Postmen and Drammens BK as well as the International Order of Good Templars. He died in December 1966, aged 79.
