= Per Martinsen =

Norwegian footballer (1936–2021)

Personal information
- Date of birth: 28 April 1936
- Date of death: 12 January 2021 (aged 84)

International career
Years	Team	Apps	(Gls)
1962	Norway	2	(0)

Per Martinsen (28 April 1936 – 12 January 2021) was a Norwegian footballer. He played in two matches for the Norway national football team in 1962.
