= Ole Petter Wie =

Norwegian businessperson (born 1966)

Ole Petter Wie (born 1966) is a Norwegian businessperson.

He was hired as CEO of Norway's largest brewery Ringnes in 2009. Before this he worked in The Coca-Cola Company from 1992 to 2000, Dayrates from 2000 to 2003 (as CEO) and McKinsey & Company from 2003 to 2005. He was then vice president at the Nestlé Global Headquarter from 2005 to 2008 and sales director in Ringnes from 2008 to 2009.
