= Rangdi Krogstad =

Norwegian politician

Rangdi Wetterhus Krogstad (born 5 March 1966) is a Norwegian politician for the Conservative Party.

She served as a deputy representative to the Parliament of Norway from Hedmark during the terms 2001–2005 and 2013–2017. She resides in Ringsaker Municipality and has been active in local politics.
