= Arnfinn Bårdsen =

Norwegian Supreme Court Justice

Arnfinn Bårdsen (born 11 July 1966) is a Norwegian judge.

He was born in Stavanger, graduated as cand.jur. from the University of Bergen in 1992 and took the dr.juris degree in 1999. He worked as an associate professor at the University of Bergen from 1992 to 2003, except for the period 1994 to 1995 when he was an acting deputy judge in Jæren. From 2003 to 2008 he was a presiding judge in Gulating Court of Appeal. He is a Supreme Court Justice from 2008. In 2018 he took a leave to become judge in the European Court of Human Rights.
