= Visolit =

- Company type: Public (OSE: TCO)
- Industry: Information technology
- Headquarters: Asker, Akershus, Norway
- Area served: Norway; Sweden; Russia
- Revenue: ▲NOK 475 million (2006)
- Operating income: NOK 30 million (2006)
- Net income: NOK 42 million (2006)
- Number of employees: 860 (2015)
- Website: telecomputing.no (in Norwegian)

Visolit (previously TeleComputing) (OSE: TCO) is a Norway-based international information technology operation, outsourcing and consultancy service company that provides services in Norway, Russia and Sweden, including IT on demand and software as a service services.

== History ==
The company is based in Asker, Akershus, has 860 employees and provides services to 770 companies.

It has been listed on the Oslo Stock Exchange since 2000, and has grown partially due to its consolidation in the Norwegian and Swedish market.

The company changed its name to Visolit in January 2019. The company was among the first in the world to offer ASP (Application Service Provider) services to companies.

Visolit was acquired by IK Partners from Ferd Capital in March 2016. As part of the transaction, IK Partners acquired a minority stake in the combined Advania group. In August 2021, Visolit was acquired by Advania, a leading provider of corporate IT solutions and cloud services. The former CEO of Visolit, Hege Støre, was appointed CEO of Advania in 2022.
