= Helge Groth =

Norwegian literary historian and diplomat (1913–1966)

Helge Otto Aars Groth (28 August 1913 – 1966) was a Norwegian literary historian and diplomat.

He was born in Stavanger, and took the cand.philol. degree in 1938. He was a lecturer in European literature at the University of Oslo from 1939 to 1953, and also as held lectures on foreign affairs in Norwegian Broadcasting Corporation radio from 1946 to 1953. Books include Hovedlinjer i mellomkrigstidens norske litteratur (1947) and Olav Aukrust, Problematikk og utvikling (1948).

He was then hired as a press and culture envoy at the Norwegian embassy in West Germany in 1953, and was promoted to embassy counsellor in 1957. He was an assistant secretary in the Norwegian Ministry of Foreign Affairs from 1962 to 1964, then a press counsellor at the Norwegian embassy in the United States from 1964 to 1966, the year he died.
