= Ulf Karlsen =

Norwegian footballer (born 1966)

Personal information
- Date of birth: 8 March 1966 (age 60)
- Position: Defender

Senior career*
Years	Team	Apps	(Gls)
–1987	Mo		
1988–1992	Bryne		
1991–1997	Viking		

International career
1991–1992	Norway	3	(0)
- * Club domestic league appearances and goals

Ulf Karlsen (born 8 March 1966) is a Norwegian former footballer who played as a defender.

Ahead of the 1988 season he transferred from Mo IL to Bryne FK, moving on to neighbors Viking FK in 1991. That year, Viking became league champions. Karlsen was also capped three times for Norway.

He retired after the 1997 season and instead entered Viking FK's board of directors.
