= Johan Gaarder =

Norwegian footballer (1893-1966)

Personal information
- Date of birth: 10 May 1893
- Place of birth: Kristiania, Norway
- Date of death: 14 July 1966 (aged 73)

International career
Years	Team	Apps	(Gls)
1922	Norway	1	(0)

Johan Gaarder (10 May 1893 – 14 July 1966) was a Norwegian footballer. He played in one match for the Norway national football team in 1922.
