= Aslaug Blytt =

Norwegian Art Historian (1899–1966)

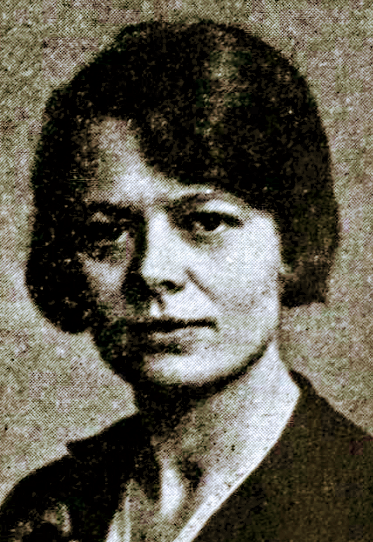
- Born: 24 April 1899; Bergen, Norway
- Died: 22 April 1966 (aged 66)
- Education: University of Oslo
- Occupations: Art historian Museum manager

Aslaug Blytt (24 April 1899 – 22 April 1966) was a Norwegian art historian and museum manager, and politician.

== Biography ==
Blytt was born in Bergen as the daughter of Johan Nicolay Lieske Blytt (1871–1953) and Sigrid Hanssen (1876–1958). She graduated in art history from the University of Oslo in 1935.

She worked 1935–47 as a teacher at Bergen Cathedral School. In 1947 she moved to Oslo as a museum lecturer at the National Gallery of Norway. In 1950, she moved back to Bergen to be head of the Rasmus Meyer art collection (Rasmus Meyers Samlinger) and Bergen Billedgalleri. She is particularly known for her book about the painter Lars Hertervig. She was also a politician for the Norwegian Labour Party. After retiring in 1964, she received the King's Medal of Merit in gold.

During the German occupation of Norway she spent about one year incarcerated at the Grini concentration camp.
