= Leif Rune Salte =

Norwegian footballer (born 1966)

Personal information
- Date of birth: 28 November 1966 (age 59)
- Position: Defender

Senior career*
Years	Team	Apps	(Gls)
1985–1988	Bryne	71	(0)
1992	Viking	2	(0)
Total		73	(0)

International career
1988	Norway	1	(0)
- * Club domestic league appearances and goals

Leif Rune Salte (born 28 November 1966) is a Norwegian former professional footballer who played as a defender for Bryne and Viking. He played in one match for the Norway national team in 1988.
