= Asbjørn Aamodt =

Norwegian footballer (1893–1966)

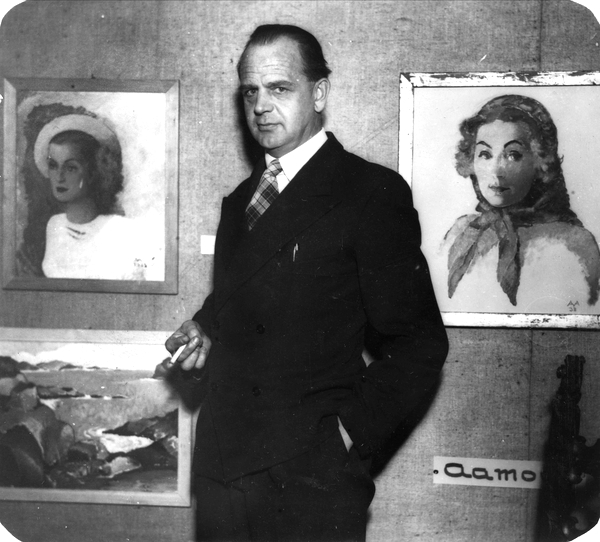
- Born: 21 August 1893; Larvik, Norway
- Died: 23 January 1966 (aged 72); Larvik, Norway
- Other name: Rolf Aakervik
- Education: Norwegian National Academy of Craft and Art Industry
- Occupations: Artist, Art critic, Footballer
- Notable work: På vei til løkka

Asbjørn Aamodt (21 August 1893 – 23 January 1966) was a Norwegian artist, art critic, and footballer. He was the father of poet Bjørn Aamodt.

In his youth, Aamodt had a minor career as a goalkeeper for Larvik Turn which culminated with him playing two matches for the Norway national football team. The first was against Russia on 14 September 1913, resulting in a score of 1–1, and the second was against Sweden on 25 October 1914, where Norway lost 0–7.

Aamodt studied at the Norwegian National Academy of Craft and Art Industry under Christian Krohg and made his artistic debut at the Autumn Exhibition in 1914. Although he initially attracted some attention for his portraits and landscapes, he eventually found steady work as a cartoonist, working for VG (1917-22) and Dagbladet (1922-25) before settling at Arbeiderbladet (1926-40), where he additionally worked as an art critic. In 1934, he caused a sensation when his painting On the way to the loop (Norwegian: På vei til løkka) was accepted at that year's Autumn Exhibition. Submitted under the pseudonym Rolf Aakervik, the hastily put together painting was intended as a parody of modernism and a criticism of the era's prevailing art scene. Aamodt also travelled widely, and from 1945 was producing drawings, articles, and travel letters for Dagbladet and Larvik Morgenavis. During this period, he continued to paint, draw, and provide illustrations for books by Norwegian writers.

At some point he moved back to his family home in Larvik, where he was killed in a fire in 1966.

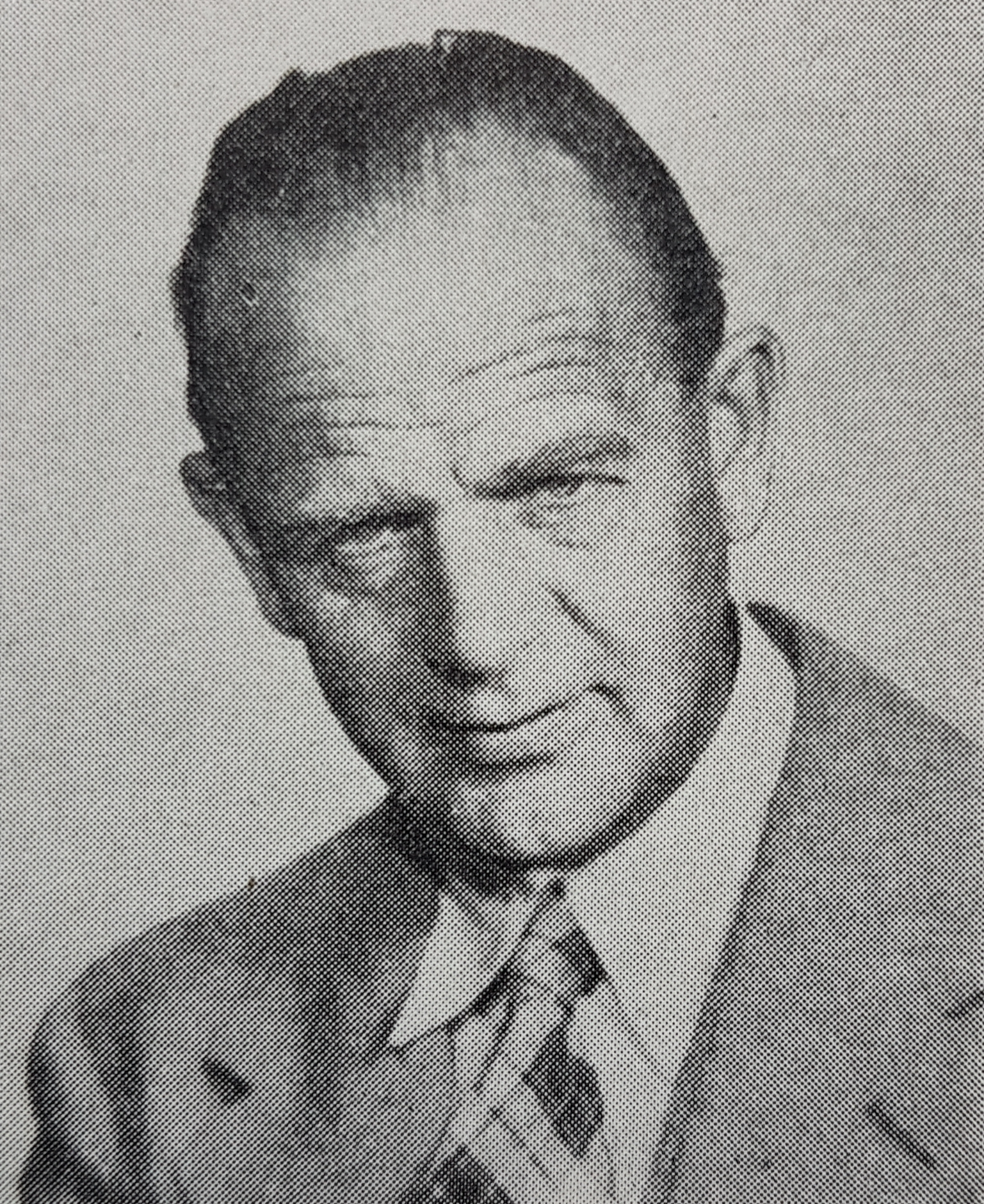
Portrait of Aamodt.

== Gallery ==
Paintings by Aamodt on display at the Hotel Wassilioff in Stavern.

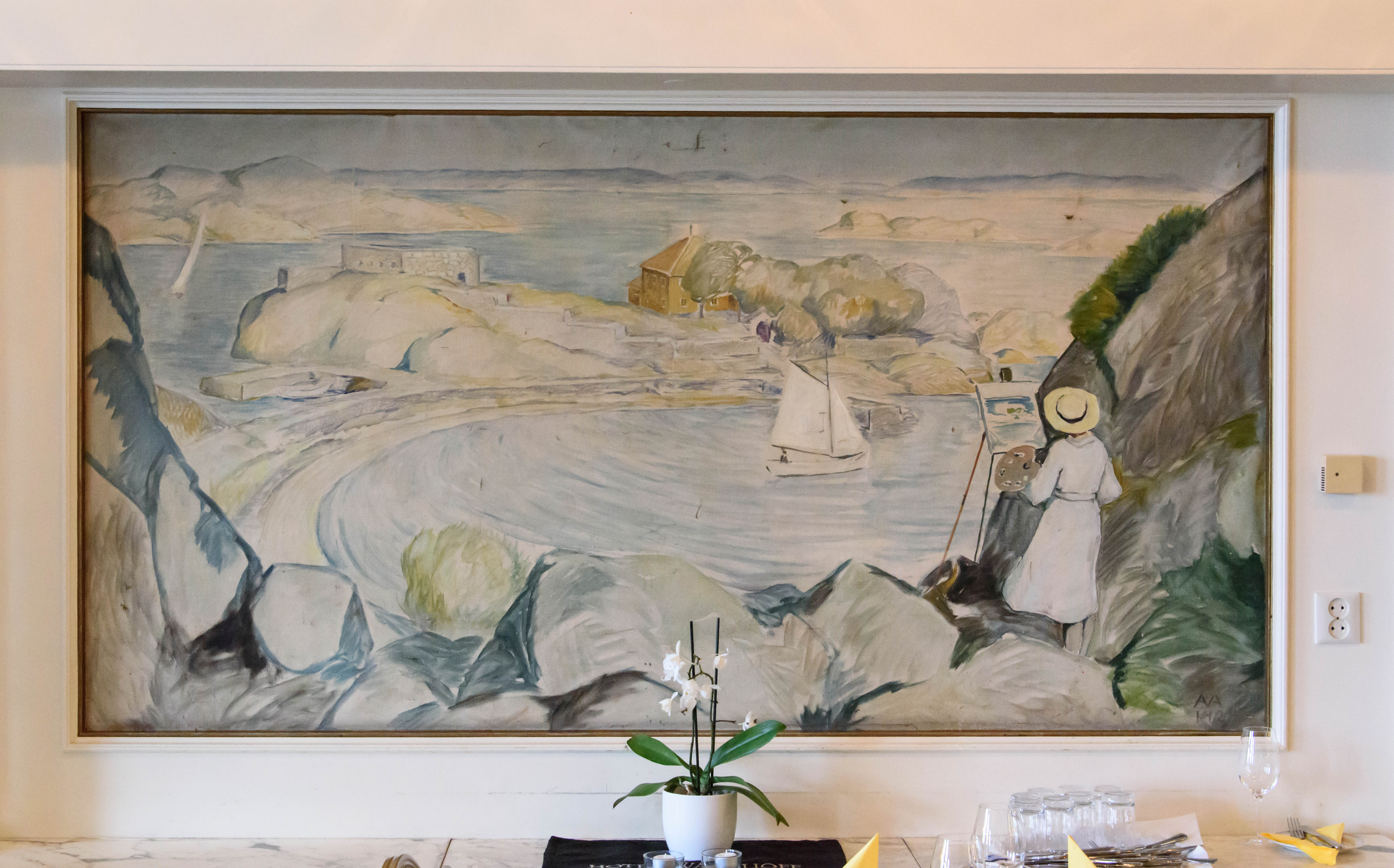

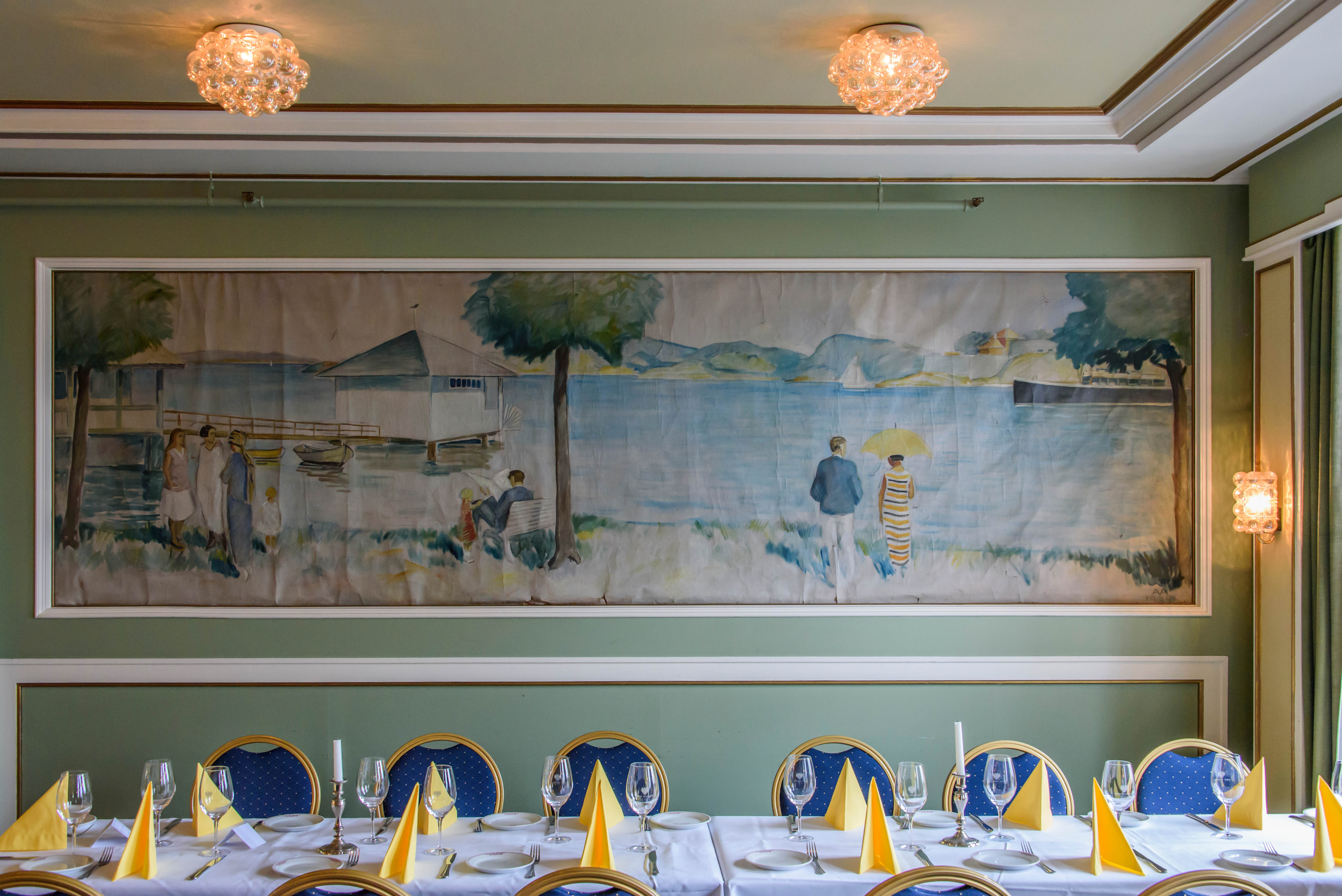
