= Kristin Eide =

Norwegian handball player

Personal information
- Born: 4 September 1966 (age 60) Trondheim, Norway

Sport
- Sport: Handball
National team
Years	Team	Apps
1984–1989	Norway	33
Medal record
Representing Norway
Women's handball
World championship
Bronze medal – third place	1986 Netherlands	Team

Kristin Eide (born 4. september 1966 in Trondheim, Norway) is a Norwegian handball player. She played 33 matches for the national handball team from 1984 to 1989, and participated at the 1986 World Women's Handball Championship, where the Norwegian team won a bronze medal.
