= William Steene =

American painter

- Born: August 18, 1887; Syracuse, New York, U.S.
- Died: March 24, 1965 (aged 77); Biloxi, Mississippi, U.S.
- Occupation: Painter
- Spouse: Eula Mae Jackson Steene

William Steene (August 18, 1887 - March 24, 1965) was an American portrait painter and muralist.

== Life ==
Steene was born on August 18, 1887, in Syracuse, New York. He graduated from the Art Students League of New York and the National Academy of Design.

Steene was an oil painter. He specialized in portraits and murals. He did over 400 portraits. He had a studio in Gulf Hills, Mississippi from 1950 to 1965.

Steene married Eula Mae Jackson Steene, and they had two daughters. He died on March 24, 1965, in Biloxi, Mississippi, at age 77.
