= Bergljot Webster =

Norwegian judge (born 1966)

Supreme Court Justice
- Incumbent
- Assumed office 2009

Bergljot Cecilie Webster (born 16 February 1966) is a Norwegian judge.

She was born in Oslo, and graduated with the cand.jur. degree in 1992. She worked in the Office of the Attorney General of Norway from 1993 to 2000, from 1999 with access to Supreme Court cases. She then worked as a lawyer in the Nordisk Defence Club from 2000 to 2004, and in the law firms Sørlie Wilhelmsen and Hjort between 2004 and 2009. She became a Supreme Court Justice in 2009. In 2014 she will have a one-year absence of leave.

She is married, has two daughters and resides at Billingstad.
