= Einar Nordlie =

Norwegian footballer (1896-1966)

Personal information
- Date of birth: 29 April 1896
- Date of death: 23 November 1966 (aged 70)

International career
Years	Team	Apps	(Gls)
1918	Norway	1	(0)

Einar Nordlie (29 April 1896 – 23 November 1966) was a Norwegian footballer. He played in one match for the Norway national football team in 1918.
