= Kjetil Siem =

Norwegian sports official

Kjetil Person Siem (born 29 September 1960) is a Norwegian businessperson, journalist, author and sports official.

== Early life and education ==
Siem was born on a small farm in Gjerdset in Eid Municipality (in present-day Rauma Municipality)3. His father was a farmer and his family was involved in sheep-raising and forestry. Siem was educated as a drama-teacher specializing in theater. In 1998, Siem helped start the local annual Mountain Festival in Rauma.

== Professional career ==
=== Sports journalist ===
Siem started out as a sports journalist, first in Aftenposten and later as a reporter covering sports for TV 2.

In 1997, Siem founded the website-based company Sportsprofiler (later Icons), who at one time developed web-pages up to 80 percent of top football players in Norway, England and Germany. The same year he authored the football books Proff i England ("Professional in England"), and Æ, a biography of Ole Gunnar Solskjær, in 1998.

=== Norwegian soccer ===
In 2001, Siem was hired as director of football in the Oslo club Vålerenga Fotball, and from 2003 to 2005 he worked as the managing director. During his tenure with the club Vålerenga won both silver and gold medals as well as making economic profit. Siem was director in Norsk Toppfotball from 2006 to 2007.

=== South African soccer ===
Siem started in 1994 the Soccer against crime project in Cape Town, South Africa and has since been involved in helping deprived communities.

Siem was hired as chief executive of the South African Premier Soccer League in 2007. His tenure coincided with the 2010 FIFA World Cup, and he was among other things responsible for the opening match at Soccer City stadium. In 2012 he was appointed Secretary-General for the Football Association of Norway, replacing Paul Glomsaker. He immediately began a campaign to improve fair-play within Norwegian football, he introduced the Handshake for peace in which the two teams captains makes an obligatory handshake at the final whistle, this was in cooperation with the Nobel Peace Center.

=== Norway football presidency ===
Between 2012 and 2016, Siem was Secretary-general of the Football Association of Norway. This ended in 2016 after the association had publicized the excessive amount of travel expenses Siem had caused the organization.

=== FIFA advisor ===
Along with Zvonimir Boban, Siem was hired by FIFA in May of 2016 to join president Gianni Infantino's management team, specifically to become strategy advisor. This ended in 2019.

=== Back in Norwegian affairs ===
In 2019, Siem joined the commercial TV 2 Group as advisor.

In 2023, Siem became director of the executive board of the afore mentioned Vålerenga Fotball soccer team in Oslo, which was subsequently relegated from the Eliteserien.

== Bibliography ==
- 1997 - Profesjonell i EngPland (Professional in England)
- 1998 - Æ : A biography of Ole Gunnar Solskjær, ISBN 82-91769-52-4
- 2008 - Begynner på P, ISBN 82-48907-68-6

Sporting positions
Preceded by Kai-Erik Arstad (acting)	Secretary-general of the Football Association of Norway; 2012–present	Incumbent
