= Gustav Edén =

Norwegian footballer (1891–1966)

Personal information
- Date of birth: 29 December 1891
- Place of birth: Råde, Norway
- Date of death: 20 September 1966 (aged 74)
- Position: Midfielder

International career
Years	Team	Apps	(Gls)
1915	Norway	1	(0)

Gustav Edén (29 December 1891 – 20 September 1966) was a Norwegian footballer. He played in one match for the Norway national football team in 1915.
