= Château de Louvignies =

Castle in Hainaut Province, Belgium

Coordinates: 50°35′11″N 3°59′10″E

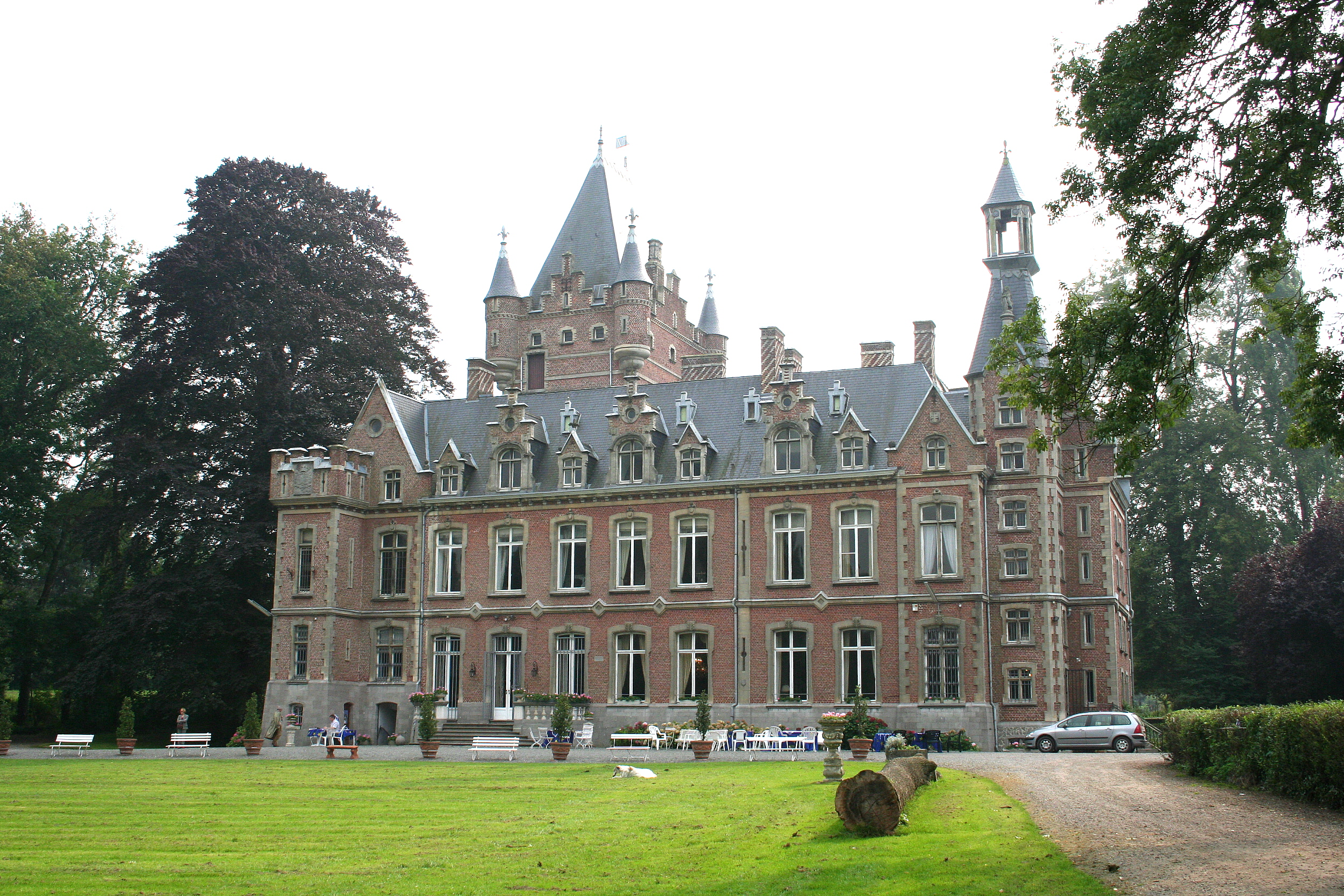
Château de Louvignies

Château de Louvignies is a castle located 6 kilometers from Soignies, in Hainaut Province of Belgium. It was designated as the seat of a lordship in 1389 and was acquired in 1716 by the Governor of Charleroi, Rodrigo de Peralta, who built a castle surrounded by a moat. In 1767, the structure was modernized with a basement addition, a tower and a ground floor stuccoed room decorated to 18th-century tastes. In 1798, through marriage, the castle became the stronghold of the Villegas Family.

The English garden, designed on the plan of a park was created in May, 1834 by C. Th. Petersen, probably at the request of Balthazar de Villegas. It became the home of Count Léon de Villegas de Saint-Pierre when he gave up a diplomatic career to become mayor of Chaussée-Notre-Dame-Louvignies, after his marriage in 1868 to Marie-Ferdinande de Maillin. In 1870 the Count began a massive renovation of the property, hiring Désiré Limbourg as the architect to renovate the buildings and Louis Fuchs, as the landscape architect. After the purchase of additional land, drainage and backfilling of surrounding moats, 600 trees were planted in 1871. The following year a pond, spanned by two bridges, was created and the cooling house was built. In 1873, paths and lawns were completed, and the park was fenced and gated. Between 1874 and 1875, the Marsh Chapel was built, followed by a stable wing and carriage house.

The castle itself was restructured between 1878 and 1882. The tower was enlarged to dominate the north side and the southern facing wing was doubled in size. A new wing on the ground floor contained state rooms, a lounge and dining room and the eastern wing was extended adding turrets and modern amenities. The entrance beneath a wide porch, which had formerly been on the west at the end of the bridge over the moat, was moved to the southern façade overlooking the park. Upon entering the vestibule, rooms branched to the right into the welcoming parlor and to the left into the pool room with a large sweeping staircase. The staircase was festooned with metal railings and motifs of the Villegas Family arms. The interior was remodeled but the fireplaces and painted areas above the doors were restored. The upstairs bedrooms with baths stood on either side of a central hallway. The kitchen and service areas were located in the basement and dumbwaiters were installed. Radiators were later added and electricity was installed in 1897.

At present the grounds are open from May to November. The interior design, furniture and household items which belonged to the Villegas Family have been preserved in the home. It is representative of the Belle Epoque period. The property has been featured in several films, including Claude Berri's Germinal, François Ozon's Angel and François-Xavier Vives' film Landes, featuring Marie Gillain. An exhibit, featuring former resident Maria de Villegas de Saint-Pierre, daughter of Count Léon de Villegas de Saint-Pierre, who grew up in the home and was a nurse during World War I was also featured in the home.
