= Bjørn Tore Hansen =

Norwegian footballer and football administrator

Personal information
- Date of birth: 7 March 1966 (age 60)

Senior career*
Years	Team	Apps	(Gls)
1983–1992	Bodø/Glimt		

International career
1983	Norway U19	4	(0)

Managerial career
- 1992–1997: Bodø/Glimt (managing director)
- 2009–2017: Bodø/Glimt (executive director)
- * Club domestic league appearances and goals

Bjørn Tore Hansen (born 7 March 1966) is a Norwegian retired footballer and football administrator.

He represented Norway as a youth international and spent his entire career from 1983 to 1992 at Bodø/Glimt. Amassing over 300 first-team games, he finally helped secure promotion from the second tier in 1992. He then became known as Bodø/Glimt's managing director from 1992 to 1997, chairman of the board from 2002 to 2005 and executive director from 2009 to 2017.
