= Maria de Villegas de Saint-Pierre =

Belgian writer

- The Countess in the nursing uniform of the Saint-Camille Nursing School
- Born: Maria-Charlotte Ghislaine de Villegas de Saint-Pierre; 14 December 1870; Château de Louvignies, near Soignies, in Hainaut Province, Belgium
- Died: 23 January 1941 (aged 70); Brussels, Belgium
- Other names: Countess Maria Van den Steen de Jehay
- Occupations: Writer, nurse
- Years active: 1902-1940
- Notable work: Profils de gosses

Maria de Villegas de Saint-Pierre, also the Countess Maria Van den Steen de Jehay (1870-1941), was a Belgian writer who won the French literary prize for her 1912 novel, Profils de gosses. She became a nurse and at the outbreak of World War I turned her family estate into a hospital. When the Germans seized her castle, she went to the front to nurse soldiers at the Hospital du Duc de Vendome near Calais and soon was transferred to the Élisabeth Hospital in Poperinge where she served as hospital director for three and a half years. After establishing the Belgian Civil Help Association, the Countess raised funds, organized and directed the association to support three hospitals, build two orphanages, run schools, provide inoculations and many other public health initiatives. She received many awards and honors, including the Order of the Belgian Crown, the Order of Leopold, the Order of the British Empire and the French Croix de Guerre.

== Early life ==
Maria-Charlotte Ghislaine de Villegas de Saint-Pierre was born on 14 December 1870 in the Château de Louvignies, near Soignies, in Hainaut Province, Belgium to the Belgian Count Léon de Villegas de Saint-Pierre and Countess Marie-Ferdinande de Maillin of Mohiville, in the Wallonian Namur Province. Her father had been a diplomat, but gave up his career to become mayor of Chaussée-Notre-Dame-Louvignies. Maria was the second child in the family and had an older brother, Alphonse and two younger siblings, brother Louis and sister Albertine, who were raised in the family castle on the estate. On May 17, 1892, she married her cousin Count Léopold van de Steen de Jehay, who worked for the royal family as a liaison between the court and foreigners. The couple lived in Brussels within walking distance of the royal palace and spent the summer months at her husband's family castle in Chevetogne in Namur Province. Within a year, she gave birth to their only son, Jean.

== Career ==
Following in the family tradition, de Villegas de Saint-Pierre became a writer and published works under the pseudonyms "Quevedo" or "Dame Peluche". In 1902, she began publishing works and in 1912 published a novel, Profils de gosses which was recognized by the French Academy. She wrote a regular fashion column and covered galas and balls, but also wrote pieces of social commentary which were ahead of their time, including L’influence féminine et les colonies (The female influence and the colonies), La ligue nationale pour la protection de l’enfance noire au Congo belge (The National League for the protection of black children in the Belgian Congo) and L’âge d’admission des enfants au travail (The entrance age of working children), publishing from 1913 in magazines like La Femme belge. She was an associate of the Society of Men of Letters.

In 1907, de Villegas de Saint-Pierre became one of the founders of the Saint-Camille Nursing School (French: École d’infirmières Saint-Camille), a Catholic training facility, which educated nurses with a religious, rather than secular method. She believed that training was needed, but as a devout Catholic felt that science and religious training could co-exist. She undertook nursing classes herself, and upon hearing rumors of impending war, took steps to have the Belgian Red Cross assist with training at the school. When World War I began, she went to the Ministry of War to complete permits to have her castle at Chevetogne turned into a neutral hospital for troops on both sides of the conflict. The facility served as a temporary emergency station, called an "ambulance", and required modifications to be suitable, such as remaking the castle living room into an operating theater. At the end of August 1914, the Germans began occupying the castle and though de Villegas de Saint-Pierre and her nurses continued to work, she made plans to work at the front. Closing the hospital, in November, she traveled through the Dutch port of Eijsden, staying with family until she could book passage on the ferry to Calais. She was also able to briefly see her brother, Louis, who having been injured in battle, was serving as a consul in Maastricht.

Arriving in Calais, the Countess presented herself to Dr. Antoine Depage, who refused her services for his famed Ambulance de l'Océan. She then went to the Hospital du Duc de Vendome to offer her services and ended up working in the linen room of the hospital for six weeks. When her family doctor, Léopold Mélis, who was also the Chief Inspector of the Health Service for the Belgian army, discovered she was working as a seamstress and not a nurse, he transferred her to Poperinge to help him establish a typhoid hospital there. The Élisabeth Hospital was established in the Castle d'Hondt with twenty-five English Quaker nurses and some of her nurses from Saint-Camille. Much of her activity as director of the hospital was for fundraising and she used her wide contact with the nobility to garner money to both build and keep the hospital going. Initially, the focus was on the civilian population with a special focus on refugee and orphaned children, but in April 1915, when the Sacre-Coeur Hospital in Ypres was closed, de Villegas de Saint-Pierre gained authorization to treat military personnel at Élisabeth Hospital.

The Countess' vast circle of contacts and organization skills were utilized to found the Belgian Civil Help Association (French: l'Aide civile belge), under the patronage of Queen Elisabeth. This organization undertook supplying funds and medical necessities for the Sacre-Coeur Hospital in Ypres, Élisabeth Hospital and the Hospital of the Museum of Hazebrouck. It also provided funds and supplies for aid stations throughout the country, organized typhoid inoculations, distributed milk for children, helped with sanitary inspections and water purification programs, built two orphanages and established nurseries, as well as rescuing the cultural heritage and property of churches, convents and civic buildings. Through the Association, she organized schools in Poperinge in the garden of the castle, since most of the educational facilities had closed and teachers had fled the bombing. Over 300 children attended the daily classes, which were inspected by the Belgian authorities. Continued bombing forced removing the school to the Derycke Farm near Zwijnaarde and then moving an additional 75 children to northern France where they attended a Flemish school in Caëstre.

In 1916, de Villegas de Saint-Pierre became ill with a severe throat infection. A blood test revealed she had sepsis and then she was overcome by gas. She was invited by Clementine de Chaumont-Quitry, Baroness de La Grange, to convalesce at her castle Château de la Motte-aux-Bois near Hazebrouck and a visit by Dr. Mélis, revealed there was a lump in her neck. He performed an immediate surgery, saving de Villegas de Saint-Pierre's life. After her recuperation, the Countess returned to her work at Élisabeth Hospital, until the war ended in 1918. She moved back to Brussels and retired from most of her hospital work, except serving on the boards of the Nursing Association, the Deux-Alice Clinic in Uccle and the Saint-Camille Nursing School. Her war work was recognized by many honors including recognition as a Commander of the Order of the Crown, a Knight of the Order of Leopold, and as a Commander of the Order of the British Empire, as well as receipt of the French Croix de Guerre with palms and Pro Ecclesia et Pontifice.

After her husband's death, de Villegas de Saint-Pierre returned to writing, but using her own name Maria Van den Steen de Jehay. She published several autobiographical works, including Mon journal d’infirmière (My Nursing Journal, 1923); Nos souverains à La Panne (Our rulers in De Panne), which was serialized in the March and April 1939 editions of Revue belge; and wrote two unpublished works L’Autre Guerre (The Other War) and British Area.

== Death and legacy ==
De Villegas de Saint-Pierre died on 23 January 1941 in Brussels and her funeral was held to much fanfare at the Cathedral of St. Michael and St. Gudula. In 2009, a biography, Une châtelaine dans les tranchées (A lady in the trenches) using the Countess' notes and papers was published, by her distant cousin, Florence de Moreau de Villegas de Saint-Pierre. In 2014, an exhibition at the Château de Chevetogne, provided artifacts and presentations on the life of the countess and ran for five months.
