= Eric J. van den Steen =

Belgian-American economist

Eric J. van den Steen is a Belgian-American economist, currently the Royal Little Professor of Business Administration at Harvard Business School.
