= Ida Helene Steen =

Norwegian geomicrobiologist

Ida Helene Steen (born 1966) is a Norwegian geomicrobiologist who studies the communities of extremophile microorganisms in deep-ocean hydrothermal vents along the Gakkel Ridge in the Arctic Ocean, seeking novel forms of biochemistry that may have applications in biotechnology and medicine. She is a professor at the University of Bergen, in the Department of Biological Sciences of its Faculty of Science and Technology, and a member of the Norwegian Academy of Technological Sciences (NTVA).

Steen is originally from Haugesund. She began studying cell biology at the University of Bergen in 1985, specialized in microbiology beginning in 1991, and completed her doctorate there in 1993. She returned to Bergen as a faculty member after postdoctoral research abroad at the University of Bath in England and Karolinska Institute in Sweden.
