= Larvik Fotball =

Norwegian football club

Larvik
- Full name: Larvik Fotball
- Founded: 1999
- Ground: Fram stadion

Larvik Fotball was a Norwegian association football club from Larvik. It existed from late 1999 to early 2004, and both succeeded and was succeeded by IF Fram. A cooperation between several Larvik-based clubs, it experienced two straight promotions to the Norwegian Second Division and played there for the rest of its existence. It ultimately capsized due to bad economy. Notably, the club never managed to form a cooperation with city rivals Larvik Turn.

== History ==
It was founded in 1999 to strengthen the city of Larvik in Norwegian football. A direct inspiration was Sandefjord BK and IL Runar from the neighboring city Sandefjord, who merged their men's senior teams to form Sandefjord Fotball in 1998, with success. Larvik Turn & IF was the city's most successful team in the past, but declined to join the merger. Instead, the merger was initiated and spearheaded by IF Fram, who was joined by Halsen IF and Tjølling IF, as well as Nanset IF, IL Sporty and SK Stag.

Their head coach was well-known Dag Vidar Kristoffersen. The new team Larvik Fotball took over Fram's spot in the league pyramid, in the Fourth Division (fifth tier). Curiously, Halsen and Tjølling played in the same league. The 2000 season ended with promotion for Larvik Fotball. In May 2001 the club debuted in the Norwegian football cup (and was eliminated by Odd Grenland), and at the end of 2001 the team had won their league and eliminated Vindbjart FK in the playoff for the Second Division. At the same time, reports went out that the club economy was "halting". Larvik Turn still declined to join the merger.

Larvik Fotball survived their first Second Division season, but Dag Vidar Kristoffersen resigned. The club hired Ole Einar Martinsen as head coach, Vidar Evensen as assistant coach and also signed Caleb Francis. The team survived the season again, but removed Martinsen and signed Swede Kalle Björklund. The team also lost several players, but did sign former professional Lars Bakkerud.

After the 2004 season the club hired its fourth head coach, Kjell Vidar Larsen. They tried to persuade Larvik Turn to merge, but the reply was again negative. During pre-season, in December 2004, it became clear that there were no economic grounds for keeping Larvik Fotball alive. The club was facing liquidation. The preferred solution was to be incorporated into IF Fram—this was possible because while Fram had given up its senior team to form Larvik Fotball, Fram still existed as an active club. The new club could be built on a foundation wall of Fram if it accepted to take over Larvik Fotball's spot in the Second Division team. Fram's board of directors accepted this in January 2005, so did the Football Association of Norway.

== Aftermath ==
The 2005 season was played under the name Fram Larvik. However, the team failed miserably. They lost 1–8 to Notodden FK in September, and in the last match of the season Fram lost 0–15 to the promotion winners Sarpsborg. Back in the Third Division, Fram actually won the league in 2007, but lost the playoff to Østsiden IL. In 2008, it won the playoff against Kvik Halden FK and returned to the Second Division.
