= Lars Bakkerud =

Norwegian footballer (born 1971)

Personal information
- Full name: Lars Henrik Bakkerud
- Date of birth: 1 June 1971 (age 55)
- Place of birth: Larvik, Norway
- Position: Midfielder

Senior career*
Years	Team	Apps	(Gls)
–1991	Fram Larvik		
1992–1998	Brann	100	(2)
1998–1999	Panionios	12	(0)
1999–2003	Helsingborg	63	(5)
2003	Hønefoss		
2004	Larvik Fotball		
2005	Vard		
2006	Løv-Ham		
2007	Norheimsund		

Managerial career
- 2006: Sandviken women (assistant)
- 2007: Norheimsund (player-manager)
- 2007: Løv-Ham (director of sports)
- 2008–2011: Helsingborg (developer)
- 2012: Brann (developer)
- 2013: Fredrikstad
- 2014–2015: Os (director of sports)
- 2015–2016: Ørn-Horten
- 2017–: FK Tønsberg (developer/director)
- * Club domestic league appearances and goals

Lars Bakkerud (born 1 June 1971) is a retired Norwegian football midfielder and later manager.

== Manager career ==
After ending his professional career, he came out of retirement to play the latter part of 2005 for SK Vard Haugesund. A back injury ruled him out already in August 2005. He was then hired as assistant manager of IL Sandviken's female team under head coach Arne Møller. Their stint ended in the summer of 2006, and Bakkerud was available to play for Løv-Ham. He was wanted as manager of Løv-Ham ahead of the 2007 season, but ended up as player-manager of Norheimsund while also taking a 30% position as director of sports in Løv-Ham. By chance, these two teams faced each other in the 2007 Norwegian Football Cup. He resigned in Løv-Ham after the 2007 season.

In mid-2008 he was hired as player developed in his former club Helsingborg. After three and a half years he took the same role in Brann, only to embark on a manager career in Fredrikstad one year later. Both Lars Bakkerud and director of sports Joacim Jonsson soon found themselves on illness absence, opening for Håkon Wibe-Lund as caretaker manager. When Bakkerud still had not returned at the end of the season, his contract was terminated.

Ahead of the 2014 season Bakkerud moved back to the Bergen Region as director of sports in Os TF. In mid-2015 he relocated to his native Vestfold as manager of Ørn-Horten. After a bad start in the 2016 2. divisjon he resigned his position. In 2017 he was ready for another club in the region, FK Tønsberg, where he became player developer, director of sports and coach.

== Personal life ==
He married footballer Elin Hopland in the summer of 1996.
